= 2011–12 Carlisle United F.C. season =

Carlisle United F.C.
2011–12 season
- Chairman: Andrew Jenkins
- Manager: Greg Abbott
- League One: 8th
- FA Cup: Second round
- League Cup: Second round
- Football League Trophy: First round
- Top goalscorer: League: 14 – Lee Miller; All: 15 – Lee Miller
- Highest home attendance: 7,721 vs. Sheffield United, 2 January 2012
- Lowest home attendance: 3,694 vs. Rochdale, 6 March 2012
- Average home league attendance: 5,247

This page will show the progress of Carlisle United F.C.'s campaign in the 2011–12 football season. This season they compete in the third tier of English football, League One.

== League table ==
Pos	Team	Pld	W	D	L	GF	GA	GD	Pts	Promotion, qualification or relegation
6	Stevenage	46	18	19	9	69	44	+25	73	Qualification for League One play-offs (Note: Four teams play for one spot and promotion to Football League Championship.)
7	Notts County	46	21	10	15	75	63	+12	73	
8	Carlisle United	46	18	15	13	65	66	−1	69	
9	Brentford	46	18	13	15	63	52	+11	67	
10	Colchester United	46	13	20	13	61	66	−5	59	

Updated to match(es) played on 5 May 2012. Source: BBC Sport
Rules for classification: 1) Points; 2) Goal difference; 3) Number of goals scored

== Squad statistics ==
=== Appearances and goals ===
As of 5 May 2012

No.	Pos	Nat	Player	Total		League One		FA Cup		League Cup		FL Trophy	
No.	Pos	Nat	Player	Apps	Goals	Apps	Goals	Apps	Goals	Apps	Goals	Apps	Goals
1	GK	(England) ENG	Adam Collin	50	0	45+0	0	2+0	0	2+0	0	1+0	0
2	DF	(United States) USA	Frankie Simek	25	0	25+0	0	0+0	0	0+0	0	0+0	0
3	DF	(England) ENG	Matty Robson	31	1	25+2	1	2+0	0	2+0	0	0+0	0
4	MF	(Scotland) SCO	Jon-Paul McGovern	50	5	40+5	3	2+0	0	2+0	1	0+1	1
5	DF	(England) ENG	Danny Livesey	32	1	26+2	1	1+0	0	2+0	0	1+0	0
6	DF	(Ireland) EIR	Peter Murphy	41	1	37+1	1	1+0	0	1+0	0	1+0	0
7	MF	(England) ENG	Andy Welsh	24	0	3+18	0	0+0	0	0+2	0	1+0	0
8	MF	(Ireland) EIR	Graham Kavanagh	1	0	0+0	0	0+0	0	1+0	0	0+0	0
9	FW	(Scotland) SCO	Rory Loy (injured–broken leg)	25	4	18+2	3	2+0	1	0+2	0	0+1	0
10	FW	(Ireland) EIR	Paddy Madden	19	1	6+12	1	0+1	0	0+0	0	0+0	0
11	MF	(England) ENG	Paul Thirlwell	28	1	24+1	1	2+0	0	1+0	0	0+0	0
12	MF	(England) ENG	Tom Taiwo	41	3	32+5	3	0+1	0	2+0	0	0+1	0
13	FW	(Ivory Coast) CIV	François Zoko	51	14	35+11	13	0+2	0	2+0	0	1+0	1
14	FW	(Scotland) SCO	Lee Miller (injured – out for the season)	36	15	33+0	14	2+0	1	0+0	0	1+0	0
15	FW	(England) ENG	Craig Curran	16	0	2+10	0	0+1	0	2+0	0	1+0	0
16	FW	(France) FRA	Jérémy Hélan (Loan completed)	2	0	0+2	0	0+0	0	0+0	0	0+0	0
16	FW	(England) ENG	Jordan Cook (Loan completed)	14	4	6+8	4	0+0	0	0+0	0	0+0	0
17	MF	(England) ENG	Liam Noble	44	7	32+8	6	2+0	1	1+0	0	1+0	0
19	DF	(Wales) WAL	Christian Ribeiro (Loan completed)	7	0	5+0	0	2+0	0	0+0	0	0+0	0
19	DF	(England) ENG	Ben Parker (Loan completed)	5	1	5+0	1	0+0	0	0+0	0	0+0	0
19	FW	(England) ENG	Mark Beck	2	0	0+2	0	0+0	0	0+0	0	0+0	0
20	GK	(England) ENG	Mark Gillespie	1	0	1+0	0	0+0	0	0+0	0	0+0	0
21	MF	(Ireland) EIR	James Berrett	45	10	40+0	9	2+0	1	2+0	0	1+0	0
22	DF	(England) ENG	James Tavernier (Loan completed)	17	0	16+0	0	0+0	0	0+0	0	1+0	0
23	GK	(England) ENG	Tony Caig	0	0	0+0	0	0+0	0	0+0	0	0+0	0
24	MF	(England) ENG	Chris Chantler (injured – out for the season)	13	0	10+2	0	0+1	0	0+0	0	0+0	0
25	DF	(Slovakia) SVK	Ľubomír Michalík	38	0	33+3	0	2+0	0	0+0	0	0+0	0
27	MF	(England) ENG	Ben McKenna (out on loan)	0	0	0+0	0	0+0	0	0+0	0	0+0	0
29	DF	(Ireland) EIR	Stephen O'Halloran	5	0	3+0	0	0+0	0	1+0	0	1+0	0
32	MF	(England) ENG	Josh Todd	0	0	0+0	0	0+0	0	0+0	0	0+0	0

=== Top scorers ===
Place	Position	Nation	Number	Name	League One	FA Cup	League Cup	FL Trophy	Total
1	FW	(Scotland)	14	Lee Miller	14	1	0	0	15
2	FW	(Ivory Coast)	13	François Zoko	13	0	0	1	14
3	MF	(Republic of Ireland)	21	James Berrett	9	1	0	0	10
4	MF	(England)	17	Liam Noble	6	1	0	0	7
5	MF	(Scotland)	4	Jon-Paul McGovern	3	0	1	1	5
6	FW	(England)	16	Jordan Cook	4	0	0	0	4
6	FW	(Scotland)	9	Rory Loy	3	1	0	0	4
8	MF	(England)	12	Tom Taiwo	3	0	0	0	3
9	DF	(England)	3	Matty Robson	2	0	0	0	2
10	DF	(England)	5	Danny Livesey	1	0	0	0	1
10	FW	(Republic of Ireland)	10	Paddy Madden	1	0	0	0	1
10	DF	(Republic of Ireland)	6	Peter Murphy	1	0	0	0	1
10	DF	(England)	16	Ben Parker	1	0	0	0	1
10	MF	(England)	11	Paul Thirlwell	1	0	0	0	1
				TOTALS	62	4	1	2	69

=== Disciplinary record ===
Number	Nation	Position	Name	League One		FA Cup		League Cup		FL Trophy		Total	
Number	Nation	Position	Name	Yellow card	Red card	Yellow card	Red card	Yellow card	Red card	Yellow card	Red card	Yellow card	Red card
21	(Republic of Ireland)	MF	James Berrett	10	0	0	0	2	0	1	1	13	1
6	(England)	DF	Peter Murphy	9	0	0	0	0	0	1	1	9	1
3	(England)	DF	Matty Robson	3	1	1	0	1	0	0	0	5	1
14	(Scotland)	FW	Lee Miller	1	1	0	0	0	0	0	0	1	1
17	(England)	MF	Liam Noble	10	0	0	0	0	0	0	0	10	0
12	(England)	MF	Tom Taiwo	6	0	0	0	1	0	0	0	7	0
25	(Slovakia)	FW	Ľubomír Michalík	6	0	0	0	0	0	0	0	6	0
13	(Ivory Coast)	FW	François Zoko	5	0	0	0	0	0	0	0	5	0
5	(England)	DF	Danny Livesey	3	0	0	0	1	0	0	0	4	0
11	(England)	MF	Paul Thirlwell	3	0	1	0	0	0	0	0	4	0
2	(United States)	DF	Frankie Simek	3	0	0	0	0	0	0	0	3	0
22	(England)	DF	James Tavernier	3	0	0	0	0	0	0	0	3	0
15	(England)	FW	Craig Curran	1	0	0	0	1	0	0	0	2	0
4	(Scotland)	MF	Jon-Paul McGovern	2	0	0	0	0	0	0	0	2	0
			TOTALS	61	2	2	0	6	0	2	2	71	4

== Results ==
=== Pre-season friendlies ===
8 July 2011	Kendal Town	1–5	Carlisle United	Kendal
19:30	McEvatt 75'		Berrett 14'; Curran 36'; Green 48'; Welsh 83'; Zoko 90'	Stadium: Lakeland Radio Stadium

19 July 2011	Morecambe	2–1	Carlisle United	Morecambe
19:45	Charnock 76'; Jevons 81'		Loy 22'	Stadium: Globe Arena

23 July 2011	Carlisle United	1–0	Doncaster Rovers	Carlisle
15:00	Curran 43'			Stadium: Brunton Park; Attendance: 1,851

26 July 2011	Carlisle United	2–0	Middlesbrough	Carlisle
19:30	Berrett 22'; Loy 43'			Stadium: Brunton Park; Attendance: 2,218

27 July 2011	Workington	2–0	Carlisle United	Workington
19:30	J. Wright 71' (pen.); Tucker 76'			Stadium: Borough Park; Attendance: 229

30 July 2011	Bradford City	1–3	Carlisle United	Bradford
15:00	Stewart 2'		Taiwo 45'; Berrett 54', 78'	Stadium: Valley Parade; Attendance: 1,107

=== League One ===
6 August 2011 1	Carlisle United	0–3	Notts County	Carlisle
15:00			J. Hughes 13'; Zoko 32' (o.g.); L. Hughes 45+3'	Stadium: Brunton Park; Attendance: 5,941

13 August 2011 2	Bury	0–2	Carlisle United	Bury
15:00			Berrett 68'; Noble 90+3'	Stadium: Gigg Lane; Attendance: 3,640

16 August 2011 3	Rochdale	0–0	Carlisle United	Rochdale
19:45				Stadium: Spotland Stadium; Attendance: 2,671

20 August 2011 4	Carlisle United	2–1	Bournemouth	Carlisle
15:00	Taiwo 49'; Byrne 77' (o.g.)		Arter 61' (pen.)	Stadium: Brunton Park; Attendance: 4,422

27 August 2011 5	Leyton Orient	1–2	Carlisle United	Leyton
15:00	Smith 53'		Miller 68', 87'	Stadium: Brisbane Road; Attendance: 3,524

3 September 2011 6	Carlisle United	1–3	Milton Keynes Dons	Carlisle
15:00	Miller 52'		MacDonald 45'; Potter 47'; Lewington 62'	Stadium: Brunton Park; Attendance: 4,919; Referee: Mark Clattenburg

10 September 2011 7	Carlisle United	1–2	Hartlepool United	Carlisle
15:00	Loy 74' (pen.)		Liddle 21'; Boyd 41'	Stadium: Brunton Park; Attendance: 4,765; Referee: Anthony Taylor

13 September 2011 8	Tranmere Rovers	1–2	Carlisle United	Tranmere
19:45	Akins 51'		Miller 3'; Berrett 35' (pen.)	Stadium: Prenton Park; Attendance: 4,219; Referee: Scott Mathieson

17 September 2011 9	Chesterfield	4–1	Carlisle United	Chesterfield
15:00	Clarke 3', 26', 51'; Craig Westcarr 65'		Miller 20'	Stadium: B2net Stadium; Attendance: 6,445; Referee: Nigel Miller

24 September 2011 10	Carlisle United	1–0	Stevenage	Carlisle
15:00	Murphy 27'			Stadium: Brunton Park; Attendance: 4,063; Referee: David Webb

1 October 2011 11	Walsall	1–1	Carlisle United	Walsall
15:00	Grigg 33'		Robson 50'	Stadium: Bescot Stadium; Attendance: 3,831; Referee: Lee Collins

8 October 2011 12	Carlisle United	2–2	Brentford	Carlisle
15:00	Berrett 23'; Clarkson 63' (o.g.)		Clarkson 9'; Diagouraga 88'	Stadium: Brunton Park; Attendance: 4,134; Referee: Rob Lewis

15 October 2011 13	Yeovil Town	0–3	Carlisle United	Yeovil
15:00			Berrett 55'; McGovern 65'; Livesey 84'	Stadium: Huish Park; Attendance: 3,673; Referee: Carl Berry

22 October 2011 14	Charlton Athletic	4–0	Carlisle United	London
15:00	Kermorgant 13', 37'; Wright-Phillips 21'; Hollands 48'			Stadium: The Valley; Attendance: 16,741; Referee: Darren Sheldrake

25 October 2011 15	Carlisle United	3–2	Sheffield Wednesday	Carlisle
19:45	Miller 50'; Loy 57'; Noble 64'		Marshall 35'; Jones 88'	Stadium: Brunton Park; Attendance: 6,058; Referee: Paul Tierney

29 October 2011 16	Carlisle United	3–3	Oldham Athletic	Carlisle
15:00	Miller 45+2'; Zoko 48', 90+4'		Kuqi 22' (pen.), 38'; Adeyemi 33'	Stadium: Brunton Park; Attendance: 4,803; Referee: Andy Haines

5 November 2011 17	Exeter City	0–0	Carlisle United	Exeter
15:00				Stadium: St James Park; Attendance: 4,245; Referee: James Adcock

19 November 2011 18	Sheffield United	1–0	Carlisle United	Sheffield
15:00	Evans 21'			Stadium: Bramall Lane; Attendance: 16,840; Referee: Phil Gibbs

26 November 2011 19	Carlisle United	1–0	Colchester United	Carlisle
15:00	Thirlwell 22'			Stadium: Brunton Park; Attendance: 4,435; Referee: Mark Heywood

10 December 2011 20	Scunthorpe United	1–2	Carlisle United	Scunthorpe
15:00	Barcham 3'	Report	Berrett 64'; Zoko 90+1'	Stadium: Glanford Park; Attendance: 3,624; Referee: Darren Deadman

17 December 2011 21	Carlisle United	2–2	Wycombe Wanderers	Carlisle
15:00	Loy 2'; Zoko 86'		McNamee 28'; Trotta 36'	Stadium: Brunton Park; Attendance: 4,414; Referee: Geoff Eltringham

26 December 2011 22	Preston North End	3–3	Carlisle United	Preston
13:30	Hume 22'; Parry 31' (pen.); Douglas 90+2'	Report	Miller 20' (pen.); Zoko 45+6'; Berrett 62'	Stadium: Deepdale; Attendance: 17,518; Referee: Steven Rushton

30 December 2011 23	Huddersfield Town	1–1	Carlisle United	Huddersfield
19:45	Rhodes 38'	Report	Noble 8'	Stadium: Galpharm Stadium; Attendance: 13,962; Referee: Michael Naylor

2 January 2012 24	Carlisle United	3–2	Sheffield United	Carlisle
15:00	Zoko 2', 15'; McGovern 71'	Report	Evans 7', 45+1'	Stadium: Brunton Park; Attendance: 7,721; Referee: James Adcock

7 January 2012 25	Carlisle United	4–1	Leyton Orient	Carlisle
15:00	Zoko 1'; Robson 30'; Taiwo 37'; Berrett 73'	Report	Cureton 85'	Stadium: Brunton Park; Attendance: 4,964; Referee: Christopher Sarginson

14 January 2012 26	Milton Keynes Dons	ppd.	Carlisle United	Milton Keynes
15:00				Stadium: Stadium MK

21 January 2012 26	Carlisle United	1–1	Walsall	Carlisle
15:00	Miller 24'	Report	Nicholls 82' (pen.)	Stadium: Brunton Park; Attendance: 5,051; Referee: Craig Pawson

28 January 2012 27	Hartlepool United	4–0	Carlisle United	Hartlepool
15:00	James 6', 62'; Sweeney 17'; Nish 81'	Report		Stadium: Victoria Park; Attendance: 5,996; Referee: Bobby Madley

4 February 2012 28	Carlisle United	2–1	Chesterfield	Carlisle
15:00	Parker 75'; Zoko 84'	Report	Talbot 16'	Stadium: Brunton Park; Attendance: 4,312; Referee: Geoff Eltringham

11 February 2012 29	Stevenage	ppd.	Carlisle United	Stevenage
15:00				Stadium: Broadhall Way

14 February 2012 29	Carlisle United	0–0	Tranmere Rovers	Carlisle
19:45		Report		Stadium: Brunton Park; Attendance: 4,152; Referee: Darren Drysdale

20 February 2012 30	Brentford	4–0	Carlisle United	Brentford
19:45	Dean 28'; Saunders 32'; Berahino 41', 53'	Report		Stadium: Griffin Park; Attendance: 4,292; Referee: Tony Bates

25 February 2012 31	Carlisle United	3–2	Yeovil Town	Carlisle
15:00	Miller 24' (pen.); Madden 49'; Zoko 90+3'	Report	Obika 46'; Blizzard 82'	Stadium: Brunton Park; Attendance: 4,292; Referee: Scott Mathieson

3 March 2012 32	Notts County	2–0	Carlisle United	Nottingham
15:00	Forte 33'; Sheehan 38'	Report		Stadium: Meadow Lane; Attendance: 6,451; Referee: Carl Berry

6 March 2012 33	Carlisle United	2–1	Rochdale	Carlisle
15:00	McGovern 57'; Zoko 76'	Report	Kennedy 74'	Stadium: Brunton Park; Attendance: 3,694; Referee: Colin Webster

10 March 2012 34	Carlisle United	4–1	Bury	Carlisle
15:00	Noble 25'; Cook 78'; Miller 88' (pen.), 90+3'	Report	Coke 23'	Stadium: Brunton Park; Attendance: 4,855; Referee: Trevor Kettle

17 March 2012 35	Bournemouth	1–1	Carlisle United	Bournemouth
15:00	Addison 83'	Report	Miller 4'	Stadium: Dean Court; Attendance: 5,240; Referee: Phil Gibbs

20 March 2012 36	Carlisle United	0–0	Preston North End	Carlisle
19:45		Report		Stadium: Brunton Park; Attendance: 6,925; Referee: Carl Boyeson

24 March 2012 37	Colchester United	1–1	Carlisle United	Colchester
15:00	Rowlands 51'	Report	Berrett 68'	Stadium: Colchester Community Stadium; Attendance: 3,672; Referee: Gary Sutton

27 March 2012 38	Milton Keynes Dons	1–2	Carlisle United	Milton Keynes
19:45	Williams 80' (pen.)	Report	Cook 83', 90+2' (pen.)	Stadium: Stadium MK; Attendance: 8,609; Referee: Mark Heywood

31 March 2012 39	Carlisle United	2–1	Huddersfield Town	Carlisle
15:00	Berrett 48'; Miller 90+5'	Report	Novak 80'	Stadium: Brunton Park; Attendance: 7,530; Referee: Nigel Miller

6 April 2012 40	Wycombe Wanderers	1–1	Carlisle United	High Wycombe
15:00	Lewis 90+1'	Report	Basey 62' (o.g.)	Stadium: Adams Park; Attendance: 4,823; Referee: Rob Lewis

9 April 2012 41	Carlisle United	0–0	Scunthorpe United	Carlisle
15:00		Report		Stadium: Brunton Park; Attendance: 6,555; Referee: Jock Waugh

14 April 2012 42	Carlisle United	0–1	Charlton Athletic	Carlisle
15:00		Report	Wright-Phillips 76'	Stadium: Brunton Park; Attendance: 6,625; Referee: David Webb

17 April 2012 43	Stevenage	1–0	Carlisle United	Stevenage
19:45	Mousinho 76'	Report		Stadium: Broadhall Way; Attendance: 3,438; Referee: Brendan Malone

21 April 2012 44	Sheffield Wednesday	2–1	Carlisle United	Sheffield
15:00	Lines 26'; Antonio 90+5'	Report	Berrett 82'	Stadium: Hillsborough Stadium; Attendance: 21,934; Referee: Simon Hooper

28 April 2012 45	Carlisle United	4–1	Exeter City	Carlisle
15:00	Zoko 34', 77'; Cook 42'; Noble 51'	Report	Sercombe 35'	Stadium: Brunton Park; Attendance: 6,029; Referee: Fred Graham

5 May 2012 46	Oldham Athletic	2–1	Carlisle United	Oldham
15:00	Tarkowski 49'; Tounkara 72'	Report	Taiwo 68'	Stadium: Boundary Park; Attendance: 5,152; Referee: Craig Pawson

=== FA Cup ===
12 November 2011 First round	Alfreton Town	0–4	Carlisle United	Alfreton
15:00			Miller 24'; Loy 33'; Berrett 41'; Noble 45'	Stadium: North Street; Attendance: 1,488; Referee: Eddir Idlerton

3 December 2011 Second round	Charlton Athletic	2–0	Carlisle United	London
15:00	Morrison 64'; Euell 90+1'	Report		Stadium: The Valley; Attendance: 7,461; Referee: Andy Madley

=== League Cup ===
9 August 2011 First round	Oldham Athletic	1–1 (a.e.t.) (2–4 p)	Carlisle United	Oldham
19:45	Reid 24' (pen.)		McGovern 57'	Stadium: Boundary Park; Attendance: 1,786
	Penalties
	Furman (penalty scored); Smith (penalty scored); Taylor (penalty missed); Parker (penalty missed)		McGovern (penalty scored); Welsh (penalty scored); Robson (penalty missed); Berrett (penalty scored); Loy (penalty scored)

30 August 2011 Second round	Aldershot Town	2–0	Carlisle United	Aldershot
19:45	Rankine 45'; Livesey 75' (o.g.)			Stadium: Recreation Ground; Attendance: 2,809; Referee: James Linington

=== Football League Trophy ===
6 September 2011 First round	Accrington Stanley	3–2	Carlisle United	Accrington
19:45	Lindfield 35'; Amond 86'; Procter 90'		McGovern 61'; Zoko 68'	Stadium: Crown Ground; Attendance: 1,069

== Transfers ==
Players transferred in
Date	Pos.	Name	Previous club	Fee	Ref.
1 June 2011	MF	(Scotland) Andy Welsh	(England) Yeovil Town	Free transfer (Bosman)	
20 June 2011	MF	(Scotland) Jon-Paul McGovern	(England) Swindon Town	Free transfer (Bosman)	
24 June 2011	DF	(Republic of Ireland) Stephen O'Halloran	(England) Coventry City	Free transfer	
23 August 2011	FW	(Scotland) Lee Miller	(England) Middlesbrough	Free transfer	
6 January 2012	MF	(England) Chris Chantler	(England) Manchester City	Signed on after loan	
12 January 2012	MF	(England) Liam Noble	(England) Sunderland	Free transfer (after loan)	
Players loaned in
Date from	Pos.	Name	From	Date to	Ref.
15 July 2011	MF	(England) Liam Noble	(England) Sunderland	3 January 2012	
11 August 2011	DF	(England) James Tavernier	(England) Newcastle United	Initial: 11 September 2011; Extended: 11 November 2011	
13 October 2011	FW	(France) Jérémy Hélan	(England) Manchester City	13 November 2011	
2 November 2011	FW	(Wales) Christian Ribeiro	(England) Bristol City	2 January 2012	
23 November 2011	MF	(England) Chris Chantler	(England) Manchester City	2 January 2012	
16 January 2012	FW	(England) Jordan Cook	(England) Sunderland	Initial: 16 February 2012; Extended: 10 March 2012	
26 January 2012	DF	(England) Ben Parker	(England) Leeds United	26 February 2012	
Players loaned out
Date from	Pos.	Name	To	Date to	Ref.
27 September 2011	DF	(England) Steve Swinglehurst	(England) Kendal Town	28 November 2011	
13 January 2012	MF	(England) Ben McKenna	(Scotland) Annan Athletic	End of season	
24 January 2012	DF	(England) Steve Swinglehurst	(Scotland) Annan Athletic	End of season	
22 March 2012	FW	(England) Craig Curran	(England) Morecambe	End of season	
Players transferred out
Date	Pos.	Name	To	Fee	Ref.
Players released
Date	Pos.	Name	Subsequent club	Join date	Ref.
28 June 2011	MF	(England) Kevan Hurst	(England) Walsall	1 July 2011	
1 July 2011	FW	(Bermuda) Nahki Wells	(England) Bradford City	22 July 2011	
1 July 2011	MF	(France) Marco Gbarssin	(Belgium) Eendracht Aalst	August 2011	
1 July 2011	FW	(Wales) Jason Price	(England) Barnet	2 August 2011	
1 July 2011	FW	(England) Ryan Bowman	(England) Darlington	4 August 2011	

== Awards ==
End of Season Awards	Winner
Fans Player of the Season	Lee Miller
cufconline Player of the Season	Lee Miller
CUSC London Branch Player of the Season	Lee Miller
BBC Radio Cumbria Derek Lacey Award	Peter Murphy
Peter Jackson the Jeweller MoM Award	Lee Miller
Special Award from Supporters' Away Travel	Peter Murphy
CUST Player of the Season	Lee Miller
Players' Player of the Year	Lee Miller
Away Supporters Player of the Season	Adam Collin
Goal of the Season	Liam Noble vs Bury
