= 2012–13 Carlisle United F.C. season =

Carlisle United F.C.
2012–13 season
- Chairman: Andrew Jenkins
- Manager: Greg Abbott
- Stadium: Brunton Park
- League One: 17th
- FA Cup: Second round
- League Cup: Third round
- Football League Trophy: First round
- Top goalscorer: Lee Miller – 9 goals
- Highest home attendance: 12,625 vs. Tottenham Hotspur, 26 September 2012

This page shows the progress of Carlisle United F.C.'s campaign in the 2012–13 football season. This season they compete in the third tier of English football, League One.

== League One ==
=== Final standings ===
Pos	Team	Pld	W	D	L	GF	GA	GD	Pts
15	Coventry City	46	18	11	17	66	59	+7	55 (Note: On 28 March Coventry City were deducted ten points for entering administration.)
16	Shrewsbury Town	46	13	16	17	54	60	−6	55
17	Carlisle United	46	14	13	19	56	77	−21	55
18	Stevenage	46	15	9	22	47	64	−17	54
19	Oldham Athletic	46	14	9	23	46	59	−13	51

Updated to match(es) played on 27 April 2013. Source: BBC Sport
Rules for classification: 1) Points; 2) Goal difference; 3) Number of goals scored

== Squad statistics ==
No.	Pos	Nat	Player	Total		League One		FA Cup		League Cup		FL Trophy	
No.	Pos	Nat	Player	Apps	Goals	Apps	Goals	Apps	Goals	Apps	Goals	Apps	Goals
1	GK	(England) ENG	Adam Collin	16	0	11+1	0	2+0	0	2+0	0	0+0	0
2	DF	(United States) USA	Frankie Simek	42	0	36+2	0	2+0	0	1+0	0	1+0	0
3	DF	(England) ENG	Matty Robson	41	8	35+1	7	1+0	0	3+0	1	1+0	0
4	MF	(Scotland) SCO	Jon-Paul McGovern	44	2	37+1	1	0+2	0	3+0	0	1+0	1
5	DF	(England) ENG	Danny Livesey	43	2	35+4	2	2+0	0	2+0	0	0+0	0
6	DF	(Ireland) EIR	Peter Murphy	26	2	17+5	2	1+0	0	2+0	0	1+0	0
7	MF	(England) ENG	Andy Welsh	14	0	8+4	0	0+2	0	0+0	0	0+0	0
8	MF	(England) ENG	Liam Noble	44	7	33+6	6	1+0	1	2+1	0	1+0	0
9	FW	(Scotland) SCO	Rory Loy	13	3	12+1	3	0+0	0	0+0	0	0+0	0
10	FW	(France) FRA	Mathieu Manset	7	0	0+7	0	0+0	0	0+0	0	0+0	0
10	FW	(Ireland) EIR	Paddy Madden (out on loan / transferred)	3	1	0+1	1	0+0	0	0+1	0	1+0	0
11	FW	(England) ENG	Danny Cadamarteri	28	2	14+11	2	1+0	0	2+0	0	0+0	0
12	MF	(England) ENG	Paul Thirlwell	35	0	29+2	0	1+0	0	2+1	0	0+0	0
14	FW	(Scotland) SCO	Lee Miller	24	9	23+0	9	0+0	0	1+0	0	0+0	0
15	DF	(England) ENG	Mike Edwards	28	0	22+1	0	2+0	0	2+0	0	1+0	0
16	DF	(England) ENG	Brad Potts	29	0	24+2	0	1+0	0	1+0	0	0+1	0
17	MF	(England) ENG	Mark Beck	31	6	7+20	4	1+0	1	0+3	1	0+0	0
18	MF	(England) ENG	Josh Todd	1	0	0+1	0	0+0	0	0+0	0	0+0	0
19	MF	(England) ENG	David Symington	35	5	3+27	3	2+0	1	0+3	1	0+0	0
20	GK	(England) ENG	Mark Gillespie	26	0	24+0	0	0+0	0	1+0	0	1+0	0
21	MF	(Ireland) EIR	James Berrett	47	3	42+0	2	1+0	1	3+0	0	1+0	0
22	DF	(England) ENG	Jordan Mustoe	14	1	14+0	1	0+0	0	0+0	0	0+0	0
22	FW	(England) ENG	Joe Garner (loan completed)	18	8	15+1	7	2+0	1	0+0	0	0+0	0
23	DF	(England) ENG	Sean O'Hanlon	19	1	19+0	1	0+0	0	0+0	0	0+0	0
23	DF	(Republic of Ireland) IRL	Sean McGinty (loan completed)	1	0	0+1	0	0+0	0	0+0	0	0+0	0
23	FW	(England) ENG	Jake Jervis (loan completed)	6	3	5+0	3	0+0	0	0+0	0	1+0	0
24	DF	(England) ENG	Chris Chantler	31	0	24+1	0	2+0	0	3+0	0	1+0	0
25	FW	(Scotland) SCO	Michael O'Halloran (loan terminated)	1	0	0+1	0	0+0	0	0+0	0	0+0	0
26	GK	(England) ENG	Tony Caig	0	0	0+0	0	0+0	0	0+0	0	0+0	0
27	MF	(England) ENG	Alex Salmon	2	0	0+2	0	0+0	0	0+0	0	0+0	0
27	FW	(England) ENG	Kallum Higginbotham (loan terminated)	11	0	7+3	0	0+0	0	1+0	0	0+0	0
31	DF	(Italy) ITA	Alessio Bugno	4	0	2+0	0	0+1	0	1+0	0	0+0	0
33	DF	(Switzerland) SUI	Valentin Gjokaj (loan completed)	1	0	0+0	0	0+1	0	0+0	0	0+0	0
60	DF	(England) ENG	Ian Haymes	0	0	0+0	0	0+0	0	0+0	0	0+0	0

=== Injuries ===
No	Pos.	Nation	Name	Date out	Date in	Injury	Reference
9	FW	(Scotland)	Rory Loy	Season start (last season)	8 December	Broken leg	setback in his recovery from a broken leg
14	FW	(Scotland)	Lee Miller	21 August 2012	15 December	Ankle – Surgery	unavailable following surgery in early Sept.
23	DF	(England)	Chris Chantler	11 January 2012	End of season	Ankle – Surgery	unavailable following surgery in February

=== Top scorers ===
Place	Position	Nation	Number	Name	League One	FA Cup	League Cup	FL Trophy	Total
1	FW	(Scotland)	14	Lee Miller	9	0	0	0	9
2	FW	(England)	22	Joe Garner	7	1	0	0	8
2	DF	(England)	3	Matty Robson	7	0	1	0	8
4	MF	(England)	8	Liam Noble	6	1	0	0	7
5	MF	(England)	17	Mark Beck	4	1	1	0	6
6	MF	(England)	19	David Symington	3	1	1	0	5
7	MF	(Republic of Ireland)	21	James Berrett	2	1	0	0	3
7	FW	(England)	23	Jake Jervis	3	0	0	0	3
7	DF	(England)	5	Danny Livesey	3	0	0	0	3
7	FW	(Scotland)	9	Rory Loy	3	0	0	0	3
11	FW	(England)	11	Danny Cadamarteri	2	0	0	0	2
11	MF	(Scotland)	4	Jon-Paul McGovern	1	0	0	1	2
13	DF	(England)	23	Sean O'Hanlon	1	0	0	0	1
13	FW	(Republic of Ireland)	10	Paddy Madden	1	0	0	0	1
13	DF	(England)	22	Jordan Mustoe	1	0	0	0	1
13	DF	(Republic of Ireland)	6	Peter Murphy	1	0	0	0	1
				TOTALS	52	5	3	1	61

=== Disciplinary record ===
Number	Nation	Position	Name	League One		FA Cup		League Cup		FL Trophy		Total	
Number	Nation	Position	Name	Yellow card	Red card	Yellow card	Red card	Yellow card	Red card	Yellow card	Red card	Yellow card	Red card
8	(England)	MF	Liam Noble	9	1	0	0	0	0	0	1	9	2
23	(England)	DF	Sean O'Hanlon	3	1	0	0	0	0	0	0	3	1
14	(Scotland)	FW	Lee Miller	2	1	0	0	1	0	0	0	3	1
20	(England)	GK	Mark Gillespie	1	1	0	0	0	0	0	0	1	1
21	(Republic of Ireland)	MF	James Berrett	8	0	0	0	1	0	1	0	10	0
11	(England)	MF	Paul Thirlwell	9	0	0	0	0	0	0	0	9	0
22	(England)	FW	Joe Garner	4	0	0	0	0	0	0	0	4	0
15	(England)	DF	Mike Edwards	2	0	0	0	1	0	0	0	3	0
5	(England)	DF	Danny Livesey	3	0	0	0	0	0	0	0	3	0
22	(England)	DF	Jordan Mustoe	3	0	0	0	0	0	0	0	3	0
2	(United States)	DF	Frankie Simek	3	0	0	0	0	0	0	0	3	0
4	(Scotland)	MF	Jon-Paul McGovern	2	0	0	0	0	0	0	0	2	0
6	(Republic of Ireland)	DF	Peter Murphy	2	0	0	0	0	0	0	0	2	0
16	(England)	DF	Brad Potts	2	0	0	0	0	0	0	0	2	0
3	(England)	DF	Matty Robson	2	0	0	0	0	0	0	0	2	0
19	(England)	MF	David Symington	2	0	0	0	0	0	0	0	2	0
11	(England)	FW	Danny Cadamarteri	1	0	0	0	0	0	0	0	1	0
10	(France)	FW	Mathieu Manset	1	0	0	0	0	0	0	0	1	0
7	(England)	MF	Andy Welsh	1	0	0	0	0	0	0	0	1	0
			TOTALS	56	4	0	0	3	0	1	1	60	5

== Results ==
=== Pre-season friendlies ===
13 July 2012	Kendal Town	0–3	Carlisle United	Kendal
19:30		Report	Miller 34'; Robson 45'; Beck 68'	Stadium: Cosyseal Stadium; Attendance: 605; Referee: Darren Handley

17 July 2012	Workington	0–5	Carlisle United	Workington
20:00		Report	Beck 9'; Symington 46', 54'; Cadamarteri 84'; Welsh 86'	Stadium: Borough Park

21 July 2012	Barrow	0–4	Carlisle United	Barrow-in-Furness
13:30		Report	Welsh 18'; Robson 29'; Beck 58', 88' (pen.)	Stadium: Holker Street; Attendance: 552

24 July 2012	Durham City	0–3	Carlisle United	Durham
19:00		Report	Beck 19', 38', 55'	Stadium: New Ferens Park

27 July 2012	Carlisle United	1–0	St Mirren	Carlisle
19:15	Miller 63'	Report		Stadium: Brunton Park

3 August 2012	Carlisle United	1–2	Middlesbrough	Carlisle
19:30	Miller 54'	Report	Main 30'; Park 65'	Stadium: Brunton Park; Attendance: 1,988; Referee: E Ilderton

7 August 2012	Morecambe	2–1	Carlisle United	Morecambe
19:35	McCready 48'; Carlton (?)	Report	Robson 53'	Stadium: Globe Arena

=== League One ===
18 August 2012 1	Stevenage	1–1	Carlisle United	Stevenage
15:00	Shroot 88'	Report	Robson 73'	Stadium: Broadhall Way; Attendance: 2,736; Referee: Fred Graham

21 August 2012 2	Carlisle United	0–3	Tranmere Rovers	Carlisle
19:45		Report	Robinson 12', 19', 66'	Stadium: Brunton Park; Attendance: 4,192; Referee: Graham Salisbury

25 August 2012 3	Carlisle United	4–2	Portsmouth	Carlisle
15:00	Jervis 13'; Livesey 48'; Berrett 90+2'; Madden 90+6'	Report	Harris 90'; Clifford 90+3'	Stadium: Brunton Park; Attendance: 5,132; Referee: Eddie Ilderton

1 September 2012 4	Milton Keynes Dons	2–0	Carlisle United	Milton Keynes
15:00	Chadwick 12'; Lowe 65'	Report		Stadium: Stadium MK; Attendance: 7,227; Referee: Oliver Langford

8 September 2012 5	Hartlepool United	1–2	Carlisle United	Hartlepool
15:00	Poole 40'	Report	Cadamarteri 76'; Robson 85'	Stadium: Victoria Park; Attendance: 4,474; Referee: James Adcock

15 September 2012 6	Carlisle United	2–2	Swindon Town	Carlisle
15:00	Jervis 14', 30'	Report	Rooney 29'; Benson 32'	Stadium: Brunton Park; Attendance: 4,987; Referee: Darren Drysdale

18 September 2012 7	Carlisle United	0–0	Crewe Alexandra	Carlisle
19:45		Report		Stadium: Brunton Park; Attendance: 3,519; Referee: Andy Haines

22 September 2012 8	Coventry City	1–2	Carlisle United	Coventry
15:00	McGoldrick 38'	Report	Cadamarteri 25' (pen.); Livesey 55'	Stadium: Ricoh Arena; Attendance: 10,674; Referee: Pat Miller

29 September 2012 9	Carlisle United	0–2	Crawley Town	Carlisle
15:00		Report	Byrne 64'; Adams 73'	Stadium: Brunton Park; Attendance: 4,221; Referee: Mark Heywood

2 October 2012 10	Bury	ppd.	Carlisle United	Bury
19:45				Stadium: Gigg Lane

6 October 2011 10	Walsall	1–2	Carlisle United	Walsall
15:00	Paterson 17'	Report	Garner 29'; Noble 90+3'	Stadium: Bescot Stadium; Attendance: 3,964; Referee: Carl Boyeson

13 October 2012 11	Carlisle United	0–4	Notts County	Carlisle
15:00		Report	J. Hughes 11'; Bishop 27'; Zoko 54'; Campbell-Ryce 57' (pen.)	Stadium: Brunton Park; Attendance: 4,731; Referee: Stuart Attwell

16 October 2012 12	Bury	1–1	Carlisle United	Bury
19:45	Thompson 36'	Report	Garner 90+1'	Stadium: Gigg Lane; Attendance: 1,923; Referee: Mark Brown

20 October 2012 13	Colchester United	2–0	Carlisle United	Colchester
15:00	Eastmond 25'; Ibehre 31'	Report		Stadium: Colchester Community Stadium; Attendance: 3,335; Referee: Steve Rushton

23 October 2012 14	Carlisle United	3–1	Oldham Athletic	Carlisle
19:45	Garner 57', 74'; Robson 82'	Report	Baxter 85' (pen.)	Stadium: Brunton Park; Attendance: 3,310; Referee: Michael Russell

27 October 2012 15	Carlisle United	2–4	Bournemouth	Carlisle
15:00	Noble 18'; Symington 78'	Report	Pugh 8', 31'; Grabban 51'; Barnard 61'	Stadium: Brunton Park; Attendance: 4,050; Referee: David Coote

6 November 2012 16	Preston North End	1–1	Carlisle United	Preston
19:45	Cummins 90+4'	Report	Garner 31' (pen.)	Stadium: Deepdale; Attendance: 9,249; Referee: Richard Clark

10 November 2012 17	Brentford	2–1	Carlisle United	Brentford, London
15:00	Douglas 20'; Hayes 61'	Report	Garner 26'	Stadium: Griffin Park; Attendance: 6,763; Referee: Andy Davies

17 November 2012 18	Carlisle United	1–4	Leyton Orient	Carlisle
15:00	Murphy 25'	Report	Mooney 18', 44'; Chorley 26'; Cook 38'	Stadium: Brunton Park; Attendance: 3,964; Referee: Tony Harrington

20 November 2012 19	Carlisle United	1–3	Doncaster Rovers	Carlisle
19:45	Symington 66'	[https://www.bbc.co.uk/sport/football/20308079	Jones 14'; Cotterill 18'; Spurr 76'	Stadium: Brunton Park; Attendance: 3,229; Referee: Mark Brown

24 November 2012 20	Yeovil Town	1–3	Carlisle United	Yeovil
15:00	Reid 65'	Report	Beck 21', 46'; Garner 70'	Stadium: Huish Park; Attendance: 3,394; Referee: Stephen Martin

8 December 2012 21	Carlisle United	1–3	Sheffield United	Carlisle
15:00	Livesey 71'	Report	Flynn 16'; Blackman 34'; Collins 84'	Stadium: Brunton Park; Attendance: 4,892

15 December 2012 22	Shrewsbury Town	2–1	Carlisle United	Shrewsbury
15:00	Taylor 22'; Parry 64'	Report	Noble 33'	Stadium: New Meadow; Attendance: 5,260; Referee: Keith Stroud

22 December 2012 23	Scunthorpe United	ppd.	Carlisle United	Scunthorpe
15:00		Report		Stadium: Glanford Park

26 December 2012 23	Carlisle United	3–0	Hartlepool United	Carlisle
15:00	Collins 21' (o.g.); Robson 27'; Miller 73'	Report		Stadium: Brunton Park; Attendance: 5,380; Referee: Mark Halsey

29 December 2012 24	Carlisle United	2–1	Bury	Carlisle
15:00	Miller 2' (pen.); Robson 10'	Report	Schumacher 53'	Stadium: Brunton Park; Attendance: 4,435; Referee: Eddie Ilderton

1 January 2013 25	Crewe Alexandra	1–0	Carlisle United	Crewe
15:00	Dalla Valle 44'	Report		Stadium: Alexandra Stadium; Attendance: 4,802; Referee: Bobby Madley

5 January 2013 26	Swindon Town	4–0	Carlisle United	Swindon
15:00	Williams 16' 55'; Collins 36'; De Vita 80'	Report		Stadium: County Ground; Attendance: 9,162; Referee: Trevor Kettle

13 January 2013 27	Carlisle United	1–0	Coventry City	Carlisle
15:00	Robson 2'	Report		Stadium: Brunton Park; Attendance: 4,071; Referee: David Webb

19 January 2013 28	Crawley Town	ppd.	Carlisle United	Crawley
15:00		Report		Stadium: Broadfield Stadium

26 January 2013 28	Carlisle United	1–1	Scunthorpe United	Carlisle
15:00	Symington 52'	Report	Hawley 76'	Stadium: Brunton Park; Attendance: 3,829; Referee: Miachael Naylor

2 February 2013 29	Tranmere Rovers	0–1	Carlisle United	Birkenhead
15:00		Report	Loy 44'	Stadium: Prenton Park; Attendance: 5,713; Referee: Tony Harrington

9 February 2013 30	Carlisle United	2–1	Stevenage	Carlisle
15:00	Loy 9'; Miller 14' (pen.)	Report	Marcus Haber 22'	Stadium: Brunton Park; Attendance: 3,944; Referee: Nigel Miller

12 February 2013 31	Scunthorpe United	3–1	Carlisle United	Scunthorpe
19:45	Sodje 17', 90+2'; Reid 22'	Report	Berrett 45+1'	Stadium: Glanford Park; Attendance: 3,112; Referee: David Coote

16 February 2013 32	Portsmouth	1–1	Carlisle United	Portsmouth
15:00	Walker 78' (pen.)	Report	Loy 51'	Stadium: Fratton Park; Attendance: 11,466; Referee: Carl Berry

23 February 2013 33	Carlisle United	1–1	Milton Keynes Dons	Carlisle
15:00	Beck 84'	Report	Chicksen 36'	Stadium: Brunton Park; Attendance: 4,383; Referee: Kevin Wright

26 February 2013 34	Carlisle United	0–3	Walsall	Carlisle
19:45		Report	Grigg 3' (pen.), 66', 86'	Stadium: Brunton Park; Attendance: 3,266; Referee: Paul Tierney

2 March 2013 35	Notts County	1–0	Carlisle United	Nottingham
15:00	Judge 35'	Report		Stadium: Meadow Lane; Attendance: 5,553; Referee: Darren Bond

5 March 2013 36	Crawley Town	1–1	Carlisle United	Crawley
19:45	Sadler 55'	Report	McGovern 23'	Stadium: Broadfield Stadium; Attendance: 2,653; Referee: Gary Sutton

9 March 2013 37	Carlisle United	2–0	Brentford	Carlisle
15:00	O'Hanlon 23'; Beck 54'}	Report		Stadium: Brunton Park; Attendance: 3,858; Referee: Scott Duncan

12 March 2013 38	Doncaster Rovers	ppd.	Carlisle United	Doncaster
19:45		[https://www.bbc.co.uk/sport/football/20308079		Stadium: Keepmoat Stadium

16 March 2013 38	Leyton Orient	4–1	Carlisle United	Leyton, London
15:00	Vincelot 32'; Batt 45+1'; Lisbie 69' (pen.); Cox 89'	Report	Robson 78'	Stadium: Brisbane Road; Attendance: 4,387; Referee: Simon Hooper

23 March 2013 39	Carlisle United	3–3	Yeovil Town	Carlisle
15:00	Miller 39', 90'; Ayling 90+4' (o.g.)	Report	Dawson 25'; Madden 51'; Hayter 78'	Stadium: Brunton Park; Attendance: 3,394; Referee: Geoff Eltringham

29 March 2013 40	Carlisle United	2–2	Shrewsbury Town	Carlisle
15:00	Miller 65' (pen.), 82' (pen.)	Report	Richards 63'; Mambo 76'	Stadium: Brunton Park; Attendance: 4,472; Referee: Mark Haywood

1 April 2013 41	Sheffield United	0–0	Carlisle United	Sheffield
15:00		Report		Stadium: Bramall Lane; Attendance: 19,005; Referee: Keith Hill

6 April 2013 42	Oldham Athletic	1–2	Carlisle United	Oldham
15:00	Baxter 73' (pen.)	Report	Noble 9'; Mustoe 33'	Stadium: Boundary Park; Attendance: 4,271; Referee: Michael Naylor

9 April 2013 43	Doncaster Rovers	0–2	Carlisle United	Doncaster
19:45		[https://www.bbc.co.uk/sport/football/21999063	Noble 35', 86'	Stadium: Keepmoat Stadium; Attendance: 7,884; Referee: Keith Woolmer

13 April 2013 44	Carlisle United	1–1	Preston North End	Carlisle
15:00	Miller 38'	Report	Monakana 12'	Stadium: Brunton Park; Attendance: 5,965; Referee: Andy Madley

20 April 2013 45	Bournemouth	3–1	Carlisle United	Bournemouth
15:00	Cook 25'; Arter 56'; Pitman 90+2'	Report	Miller 50'	Stadium: Dean Court; Attendance: 9,014; Referee: Michael Russell

27 April 2013 46	Carlisle United	0–2	Colchester United	Carlisle
15:00		Report	Massey 65'; Eastman 80'	Stadium: Brunton Park; Attendance: 5,427; Referee: Carl Boyeson

=== FA Cup ===
3 November 2012 First round	Carlisle United	4–2	Ebbsfleet United	Carlisle
15:00	Symington 45+1'; Noble 61'; Berrett 81'; Garner 87'	Report	Elder 58'; Howe 90+3'	Stadium: Brunton Park; Attendance: 2,373; Referee: Darren Bond

1 December 2012 Second round	Carlisle United	1–3	Bournemouth	Carlisle
15:00	Beck 72'	Report	30' Fogden; 36' O'Kane; 90' Pugh	Stadium: Brunton Park; Attendance: 2,980; Referee: Tierney

=== League Cup ===
Carlisle were rewarded for back to back League Cup wins at Brunton Park by entertaining Premier League giants Tottenham Hotspur in the 3rd round.

11 August 2012 First round	Carlisle United	1–0	Accrington Stanley	Carlisle
15:00	Robson 39'	Report		Stadium: Brunton Park; Attendance: 2,924; Referee: Nigel Miller

28 August 2012 Second round	Carlisle United	2–1 (a.e.t.)	Ipswich Town	Carlisle
19:45	Beck 90'; Symington 99'	Report	Luongo 23'	Stadium: Brunton Park; Attendance: 3,296; Referee: Scott Mathieson

26 September 2012 Third round	Carlisle United	0–3	Tottenham Hotspur	Carlisle
19:45		Report	Vertonghen 37'; Townsend 53'; Sigurdsson 89'	Stadium: Brunton Park; Attendance: 12,625; Referee: Kevin Friend

=== Football League Trophy ===
3 September 2012 First round	Carlisle United	1–1 (a.e.t.) (1–3 p)	Preston North End	Carlisle
19:45	McGovern 68'	Report	Beardsley 3'	Stadium: Brunton Park; Attendance: 3,471; Referee: Jeremy Simpson

== Transfers ==
Players transferred in
Date	Pos.	Name	Previous club	Fee	Ref.
11 June 2012	DF	Mike Edwards	Notts County	Free transfer (Bosman)	
21 June 2012	FW	Danny Cadamarteri	Huddersfield	Free transfer (Bosman)	
1 August 2012	DF	Alessio Bugno	Monza	Free transfer	
11 January 2013	DF	Sean O'Hanlon	Hibernian	Free agent	
8 March 2013	FW	Mathieu Manset	FC Sion	Free agent	
Players loaned in
Date from	Pos.	Name	From	Date to	Ref.
23 August 2012	FW	Jake Jervis	Birmingham City	23 September 2012	
31 August 2012	FW	Michael O'Halloran	Bolton Wanderers	Initial: 30 September 2012; Terminated: 12 September 2012	
18 September 2012	FW	Joe Garner	Watford	Initial: 17 October 2012; Extended: 19 December 2012	
20 September 2012	FW	Kallum Higginbotham	Huddersfield	Initial: 20 December 2012; Terminated: 8 December 2012	
6 November 2012	FW	Sean McGinty	Manchester United	Initial:4 December 2012; Extended: 5 January 2012	
22 November 2012	FW	Valentin Gjokaj	Derby County	22 December 2012	
21 February 2013	DF	Jordan Mustoe	Wigan Athletic	End of Season	
Players loaned out
Date from	Pos.	Name	To	Date to	Ref.
21 August 2012	FW	Josh Todd	Workington	21 September 2012	
4 October 2012	FW	Paddy Madden	Yeovil Town	Initial: 4 November 2012; Extended: 31 December 2012	
Players transferred out
Date	Pos.	Name	To	Fee	Ref.
7 June 2012	DF	François Zoko	Notts County	Free agent	
11 June 2012; 14 September 2012	MF	Tom Taiwo	Hibernian	Quit (family reasons); Signed later	
11 June 2012; 14 September 2012	DF	Ľubomír Michalík	Portsmouth	Quit; Signed (one month)	
1 January 2013	FW	Paddy Madden	Yeovil Town	Transferred undisclosed	
Players released
Date	Pos.	Name	Subsequent club	Join date	Ref.
15 May 2012	FW	Craig Curran	Rochdale	10 August 2012	
