= Danny Livesey =

English footballer

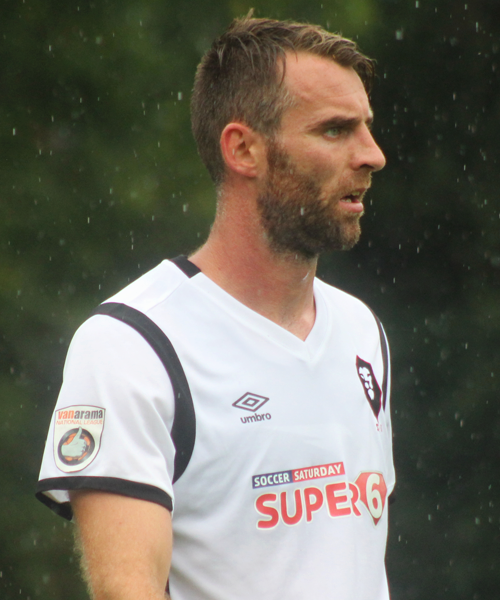
- Livesey playing for Salford City in 2017

Personal information
- Date of birth: 31 December 1984 (age 41)
- Place of birth: Salford, England
- Height: 6 ft 3 in (1.91 m)
- Position: Defender

Senior career*
Years	Team	Apps	(Gls)
2002–2004	Bolton Wanderers	2	(0)
2003	→ Notts County (loan)	11	(0)
2004	→ Rochdale (loan)	13	(0)
2004	→ Blackpool (loan)	1	(0)
2004–2014	Carlisle United	283	(19)
2014	→ Wrexham (loan)	16	(0)
2014–2017	Barrow	122	(7)
2017–2019	Salford City	9	(1)
2018–2019	→ Chester (loan)	32	(4)
2019–2022	Chester	54	(7)
Total		543	(38)

Managerial career
- 2021: Chester (caretaker)
- * Club domestic league appearances and goals

Danny Livesey (born 31 December 1984) is an English retired professional footballer. A defender, he made 311 appearances in the Football League, with his longest period being a ten-year spell at Carlisle United. He has also played for Bolton Wanderers, Notts County, Blackpool, Wrexham, Barrow, Salford City and ended his career at Chester.

== Club career ==
=== Bolton Wanderers ===
Livesey started his career at Bolton Wanderers, and made his league debut at the Reebok in a 3–2 defeat versus Liverpool at 17 (one of the youngest Premiership and Wanderers players ever). He only made one more league appearance and a couple of cup appearances, and joined Rochdale and Notts County on loan in 2003 and 2004, respectively. After this, he joined Blackpool on loan, but in his debut he suffered a serious injury and returned to the Trotters.

=== Carlisle United ===
On Christmas Eve 2004, Livesey signed for Carlisle United, who were then in the Conference and since joining has played a major part in the club's rise to League One and in August 2007, signed a contract extension until 2010. Livesey was named in the League One 2007–08 team of the year. He was also awarded the captaincy due to Paul Thirlwell's injury problems. On 4 June 2012, Livesey signed a new 1-year deal with Carlisle United with the option of a further year.

In 2014, he was released.

=== Wrexham ===
On 31 January 2014, Livesey joined Wrexham on loan for the rest of the season.

=== Barrow ===
In 2014 Livesey signed for Barrow, helping the club to win the Conference North title on the final day of the 2014–15 season in a 3–2 win at Lowestoft Town. Following the departure of Simon Grand at the end of the 2015–16 season Livesey was made the club captain, but was released when his contract expired at the end of 2016–17.

=== Salford City ===
After this release from Barrow, he joined Salford City on a two-year contract.

==== Chester (loan) ====
On 26 July 2018 he joined Chester on a season-long loan along with fellow player Anthony Dudley, reuniting them with their former Salford managers.

At the end of the season, Chester confirmed both players had returned to their parent club.

=== Chester ===
In May 2019 it was confirmed that Livesey would join Chester on a one-year contract upon the expiration of his contract with Salford City on 1 July 2019. On 24 November 2021, following the departure of joint managers Anthony Johnson and Bernard Morley, UEFA B Licensed coach Livesey was placed in temporary charge of the team.

On 1 May 2022, Livesey confirmed that he would retire from football at the end of the 2021–22 season. He confirmed that he would be starting a job at a school in September 2022.

== Career statistics ==
Appearances and goals by club, season and competition
Club	Season	League			FA Cup		League Cup		Other		Total	
Club	Season	Division	Apps	Goals	Apps	Goals	Apps	Goals	Apps	Goals	Apps	Goals
Bolton Wanderers	2002–03	Premier League	2	0	1	0	1	0	0	0	4	0
Bolton Wanderers	2003–04	Premier League	0	0	2	0	0	0	0	0	2	0
Bolton Wanderers	Total		2	0	3	0	1	0	0	0	6	0
Notts County (loan)	2003–04	Second Division	11	0	—		0	0	1 (Note: Appearance(s) in Football League Trophy)	0	12	0
Rochdale (loan)	2003–04	Third Division	13	0	—		0	0	0	0	13	0
Blackpool (loan)	2004–05	League One	1	0	0	0	0	0	0	0	1	0
Carlisle United	2004–05	Conference National	20	2	0	0	—		3 (Note: One appearance in Football League Trophy, two appearances and one goal in Conference National play-offs)	1	23	3
Carlisle United	2005–06	League Two	36	4	1	0	1	0	5	0	43	4
Carlisle United	2006–07	League One	31	1	1	0	2	0	1	0	35	1
Carlisle United	2007–08	League One	45	6	2	0	2	0	4 (Note: Two appearances in Football League Trophy, two appearances in League One play-offs)	0	53	6
Carlisle United	2008–09	League One	27	0	3	0	2	0	1	0	33	0
Carlisle United	2009–10	League One	38	2	4	0	3	0	4	0	49	2
Carlisle United	2010–11	League One	10	0	0	0	0	0	1	0	11	0
Carlisle United	2011–12	League One	28	1	1	0	2	0	1	0	32	1
Carlisle United	2012–13	League One	39	3	2	0	2	0	0	0	43	3
Carlisle United	2013–14	League One	9	0	0	0	2	0	0	0	11	0
Carlisle United	Total		283	19	14	0	16	0	20	1	333	20
Wrexham (loan)	2013–14	Conference Premier	16	0	0	0	—		0	0	16	0
Barrow	2014–15	Conference North	40	1	1	0	—		1 (Note: Appearance(s) in FA Trophy)	0	42	1
Barrow	2015–16	National League	39	3	1	0	—		1	0	41	3
Barrow	2016–17	National League	43	3	5	0	—		4	1	52	4
Barrow	Total		122	7	7	0	0	0	6	1	135	8
Salford City	2017–18	National League North	9	1	0	0	—		1	0	10	1
Chester (loan)	2018–19	National League North	32	4	2	0	—		4 (Note: Two appearances in FA Trophy, two appearances in Cheshire Senior Cup)	0	38	4
Chester	2019–20	National League North	24	5	2	0	—		4 (Note: Three appearances in FA Trophy, one appearance in National League North play-offs)	0	30	5
Chester	2020–21	National League North	14	2	3	2	—		1	0	18	4
Chester	2021–22	National League North	16	0	4	0	—		1 (Note: Appearance(s) in Cheshire Senior Cup)	0	21	0
Chester	Total		86	11	11	2	0	0	10	0	107	13
Career total			543	38	35	2	17	0	38	2	633	42

== Honours ==
Carlisle United

- Football League Two: 2005–06
- Football League Trophy: 2010–11; runner-up: 2005–06

Barrow

- Conference North: 2014–15

Salford City

- National League North: 2017–18

Individual

- PFA Team of the Year: 2007–08 League One
