= Bugno =

Bugno is an Italian surname. Notable people with the surname include:

- Alessio Bugno (born 1990), Italian footballer
- Gianni Bugno (born 1964), Italian cyclist
- Richard Bugno (1885–?), Austrian footballer
- Walter Bugno, Australian chief executive
