= Rory Loy =

Scottish footballer (born 1988)

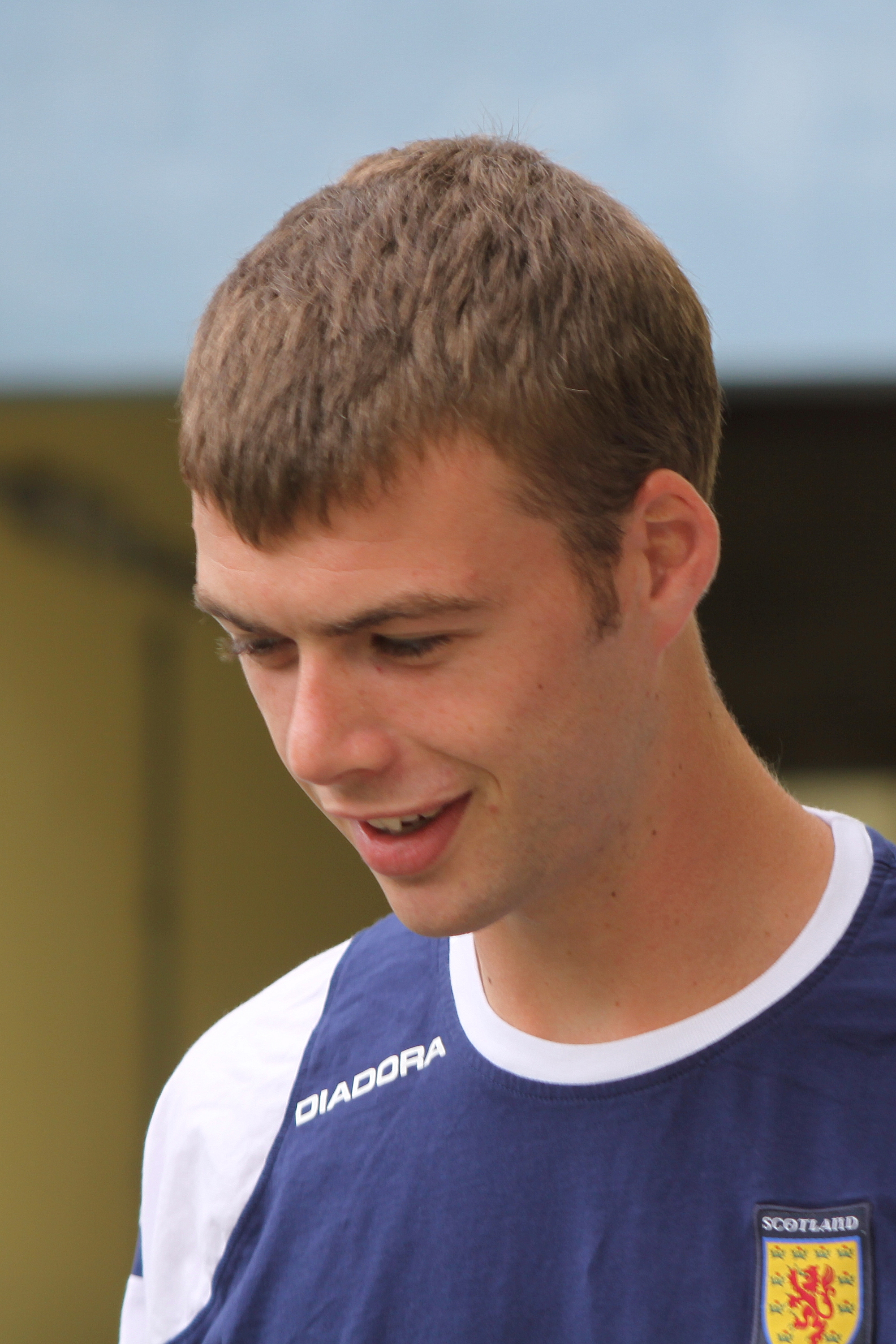
- Loy training for Scotland U21s in 2009

Personal information
- Full name: Rory James Loy
- Date of birth: 19 March 1988 (age 38)
- Place of birth: Dumfries, Scotland
- Positions: Striker; left winger

Youth career
- 2004–2006: Kilmarnock

Senior career*
Years	Team	Apps	(Gls)
2006–2011	Rangers	2	(0)
2008–2009	→ Dunfermline Athletic (loan)	18	(3)
2010	→ St Mirren (loan)	8	(0)
2011–2013	Carlisle United	50	(7)
2013–2015	Falkirk	60	(29)
2015–2017	Dundee	42	(12)
2017	→ St Mirren (loan)	13	(5)
2017–2018	Falkirk	18	(1)
2018–2019	Dumbarton	8	(0)

International career
2008–2009	Scotland U21	5	(1)
- * Club domestic league appearances and goals as of 18:40 29 September 2018 (UTC)

Rory James Loy (born 19 March 1988) is a Scottish former professional footballer now working as a football commentator on radio and television. He last played for Scottish League One side Dumbarton. He has previously played for Rangers, Dunfermline Athletic, St Mirren (two spells), Carlisle United and Dundee and Falkirk (two spells). Loy has also represented Scotland at under-21 international level.

== Early life ==
Born in Dumfries, Loy grew up in the town of Stranraer and the village of Sandhead. He attended Sandhead Primary School and Stranraer Academy. Loy began his football career at Lochryan Boys Club before joining Girvan at aged 14, then moved on to Ayr United and Kilmarnock.

Growing up, Loy was a Rangers supporter.

== Club career ==
=== Rangers ===
In August 2006, Loy was snapped up by his boyhood club Rangers for £20,000 when his contract ran out despite report from Daily Record mentioned that he "would have made the Kilmarnock first team a whole lot quicker than he will at Ibrox". After progressing through the ranks of the club's academy, it was reported on 27 October 2007 that Loy signed a one-year extension to his Rangers contract to remain at Ibrox until the summer of 2009. On 1 November 2008, he made his first team debut for the club in a Scottish Premier League match, coming on as a substitute in the 56th minute, in a 5–0 win against Inverness Caledonian Thistle. On 3 March 2009, having impressed on loan, Loy signed a further two-year extension to his Rangers contract, keeping him at the club until the summer of 2011.

After his loan spell at St. Mirren, Loy made his only appearance of the 2010–11 season for Rangers, coming on as a 73rd-minute substitute, in a 4–1 win against Motherwell on 16 October 2010.

==== Loan spells from Rangers ====
On 12 December 2008, Loy joined Dunfermline Athletic on loan until 26 January 2009. After joining the club, he revealed it was a chance he couldn't turn down. The next day, Loy made his Dunfermline Athletic debut, coming on as a substitute for Andy Kirk, in a 2–1 win over Queen of the South. On 17 January 2009, he scored his first goal for Dunfermline Athletic, in a 1–1 draw against Airdrie United. His loan was then extended with the club till the end of the season. Having agreed the loan extension with Dunfermline Athletic, Loy believed it could help him earn a first team place when he returns to Rangers. Since joining the club, he remain involved in the first team in a number of matches. Loy contributed to his role for Dunfermline Athletic in the Scottish Cup matches all up to the semi–finals but the club loss 2–0 against Falkirk. At the end of the 2008–09 season, he made twenty–one appearances and scoring three times in all competitions. Following this, Loy returned to his parent club.

On 29 January 2010, Loy joined Scottish Premier League rival St Mirren on a six-month loan deal. By the time he joined the club, Loy spent the first half of the 2009–10 season, playing for Rangers' reserve side. The next day, he made his debut for St Mirren, coming on as a 76th-minute substitute, in a 2–1 loss against Hibernian. However, Loy wasn't in the starting line-up regularly, as his playing time came from the substitute bench. During his time at St Mirren, he made eight appearances in all competitions.

=== Carlisle United ===
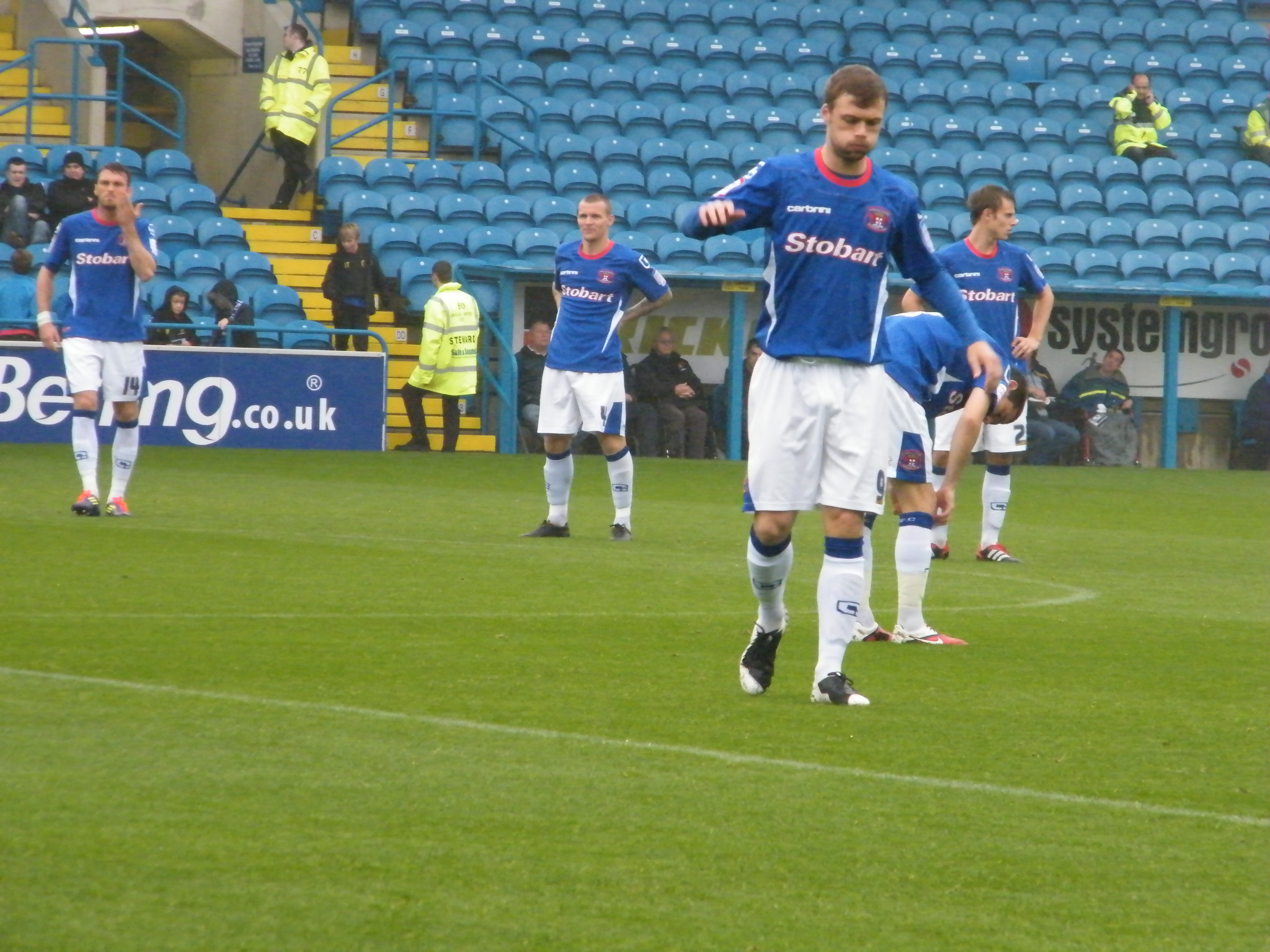
Loy in a match against Brentford in October 2011.

On 28 January 2011, English League One side Carlisle United announced the signing of Loy on a permanent deal from Rangers on a two-and-a-half-year deal for an undisclosed fee. Upon joining the club, he stated he had to leave Rangers to help revive his career.

On 1 February 2011, Loy made his debut for Carlisle United, coming on as a 66th-minute substitute, in a 2–0 loss against Huddersfield Town. On 1 March 2011, he ended his slow start for Carlisle United's career by scoring his first goal and setting a goal Ben Marshall earlier in the game, who later set up a goal for him in return, in a 3–1 win over Charlton Athletic. On 3 April 2011, Loy played the final two minutes after coming on as a substitute for Tom Taiwo as Carlisle United beat Brentford 1–0 in the Football League Trophy Final to win the tournament. At the end of the 2010–11 season, he made nineteen appearances and scoring once in all competitions. With his playing time coming from the substitute bench and lack of first team players, Manager Greg Abbott promised that he would give Loy and Paddy Madden first team opportunities next season.

At the start of the 2011–12 season, on 10 September 2011, Loy scored his first goal of the season from a penalty, in a 2–1 loss against Hartlepool United on 10 September 2011. During a 3–3 draw against Preston North End on Boxing Day, he suffered a broken leg after a nasty challenge from David Gray, leading to a nine-minute delay. Up until his injury, Loy scored three more goals for Carlisle United; twice in the league and once in the FA Cup. After a successful surgery, it was announced that the player would be out for the rest of the season, causing a Carlisle United to suffer a striker's crisis. His injury also led to Preston wishing Loy a speedy recovery, when the one of caretaker manager David Unsworth visited him at the hospital. Two months later, in mid-February, he managed to walk without using crutches, making steps towards his recovery. His first full season at Carlisle United saw him make twenty–five appearances and scoring four times in all competitions.

The start of the 2012–13 season saw Loy continuing to recover from a leg injury after undergoing a successful surgery, but his return was delayed further. By October, he slowly made his return to training. On 8 November 2012, Loy made his return to Carlisle United's reserve team, coming on as a 62nd-minute substitute, in a 16–0 win against Penrith Rangers. However, he suffered a niggling back injury that saw him out briefly. On 31 December 2012, Loy made his first appearance since his injury, coming on as a substitute for Brad Potts, in a 1–0 loss against Crewe. Upon his return, Manager Greg Abbott said praised Loy's return, saying that he "has been more sharp and positive". He scored two goals in two matches between 2 February 2013 and 9 February 2013, winning both matches against Tranmere Rovers and Stevenage respectively. After scoring two goals in two matches, Loy said in two separate interviews that he was delighted to make his return and that his absence helped him appreciate playing first-team football. Following his return from injury, however, Loy found himself in and out of the starting line–up for the rest of the season. At the end of the 2012–13 season, he made thirteen appearances and scoring three times in all competitions.

At the end of the season, Loy was among seven players to be released, upon the expiry of their contract. Days after his release, he attracted interest from a number of teams, according to his agent. While Loy, himself, says on Twitter: "Met some people and made some memories at #cufc that will stick with me forever. Two years gone by in a flash. Loved every minute. Some real nice messages from the #cufc fans. Nice touch and always nice to know you were appreciated. Thank you."

=== Falkirk (first spell) ===
In July 2013, Loy started training with Scottish First Division side Falkirk and played as a trialist in a friendly against Forfar, scoring both goals as the Bairns won 2–1. He also played in Falkirk's 2–2 friendly draw with Dunfermline. Loy signed a two-year contract with the Bairns on 31 July 2013.

He quickly established himself in the Falkirk side, scoring a double in his first home appearance against Greenock Morton on 17 August 2013. Loy scored his first hat trick for the Bairns in a 5–0 win against Cowdenbeath on 5 April 2014. He said his aim was for the club to win the Scottish Championship. Throughout the 2013–14 season, Loy became renowned for his hard work and composed finishing, and this helped him build a strong rapport with The Bairns faithful. Loy was nominated along with Peter MacDonald, Anthony Andreu and Kane Hemmings for the PFA Championship Player of the Year for season 2013–14, but he lost out to Hemmings. Despite this on 27 April 2014, Loy was awarded the Falkirk Supporters Player of the Year, along with the Players Player of the Year, capping an overall superb campaign. He was also handed the Falkirk Herald's Starshot award for the season, previously won by fan favourites Michael McGovern, Mark Millar, Ryan Flynn and Scott Arfield. He would add to his awards when he was named in the 2013–14 Scottish Championship team of year. Throughout the season, Loy was also named as Falkirk's player of the month for September, February and March by the club's supporters.

Falkirk manager Gary Holt confirmed on 1 May 2014, that Loy was one of a few players to be offered an improved contract at the club, with his current deal running until 2015, Amid to a contract signing, he scored his first goals of the season, in a 7–1 win over East Stirlingshire in the first round of the Challenge Cup. Loy scored his first league goal, in the opening game of the season, in a 2–2 draw against Cowdenbeath on 9 August 2014. A few weeks later on 23 August 2014, he added his fourth goal of the season, in a 1–0 win over Hibernian. Loy then added three more goals by the end of 2014 against Cowdenbeath, Alloa Athletic > and Dumbarton. By the end of January, Loy added two more goals when he scored against Queen of the South and Hearts. On the last day of the winter transfer window, Scottish Premiership side Hamilton Academical made a bid to sign Loy, but the bid was turned down. After the winter transfer window has ended, he added his ninth goal of the season on 27 February 2015, in a 1–1 draw against Rangers. However, Loy missed the remainder of the season after he suffered a leg injury. Despite this, Loy was named in the 2014–15 Championship Team of the Year. He managed to recover from injury in time for the Scottish Cup, by visiting The FA's St George's Park for two weeks. Loy eventually started in the final in his last appearance for the club as Falkirk loss 2–1 to Inverness Caledonian Thistle. At the end of the 2014–15 season, he went on to make thirty–five appearances and scoring 12 times in all competitions.

=== Dundee ===
On 23 February 2015, Loy signed a pre-contract agreement with Dundee, agreeing to join the club on a three-year deal at the beginning of the 2015–16 season. Upon joining the club, he was given a number nine shirt.

Loy scored twice on his competitive debut for Dundee, in a 4–0 win away to Kilmarnock in the opening game of the season. However, he suffered a knock that saw him missed one match. On 11 August 2015, Loy made his return to the starting line–up, in a 2–2 draw against rivals, Dundee United. His return was short–lived when he suffered a groin injury that saw him missed three matches. On 11 September 2015, Loy made his return from injury, coming on as a 69th-minute substitute, in a 1–0 win against Partick Thistle. On 26 September 2015, he scored his second brace for Dundee, in a 3–2 draw against Ross County. Loy later scored three more goals for the club by the end of the year, coming against Motherwell, Inverness CT and Hearts. Since returning from injury, he was involved in the first team matches, a forming a striking partnership with Kane Hemmings and Greg Stewart. On 2 April 2016, Loy ended his fifteen matches without scoring when he scored his eighth goal of the season, in a 5–2 win against Ross County. On 5 April 2016, however, Loy suffered ankle injury and was substituted in the 62nd minutes, in a 0–0 draw against Celtic. As a result, he missed three matches with the injury. On 7 May 2016, Loy made his return from injury, coming on as a 71st-minute substitute, in a 1–0 loss against Hamilton Academical. In a follow–up match against Kilmarnock, he scored his ninth goal of the season, in a 1–1 draw. At the end of the 2015–16 season, Loy made thirty–three appearances and scoring nine times in all competitions.

At the start of the 2016–17 season, Loy started the season well when he scored three goals in Dundee's first two matches in all competitions, including a brace against Ross County. On 26 October 2016, Loy ended his eight matches without scoring when he scored a late consolation, in a 2–1 loss against St Johnstone. However, Loy found his playing time, mostly coming from the substitute bench throughout the first half of the season. By the time he was loaned out, Loy made seventeen appearances and scoring four times in all competitions. He left Dundee by mutual consent on 4 July 2017.

==== St Mirren (second loan) ====
On 12 January 2017, Loy joined Scottish Championship side St Mirren on loan, having previously been on loan with the club seven years earlier. It came after when manager Paul Hartley told Loy that he can leave Dundee to get first team football.

Loy made his second debut for St Mirren on 14 January 2017, starting the whole game, in a 1–1 draw against Dunfermline Athletic. On 28 January 2017, he scored his first goal for the club, in a 2–1 against Falkirk. On 19 February 2017, Loy played a role in a match against The New Saints in the semi–finals of the Scottish Challenge Cup when he scored a late consolation, in a 4–1 win to help St Mirren reach the final. In the final, Loy started the match and scored an equalising goal, in a 2–1 loss against Dundee United. Towards the end of the campaign, Loy hit a good run of forms, scoring important goals, including a draw against Hibernian at Easter Road that resulted in the club retaining their Scottish Championship's status for another season. During his second spell at St Mirren, he made seventeen appearances and scoring seven times in all competitions.

=== Falkirk (second spell) ===
On 4 July 2017, Loy returned to Falkirk on a two-year deal.

He made his second debut for the club against Stirling Albion in the Scottish League Cup and set up one of the goals for Falkirk, in a 4–1 win. On 5 August 2017, however, Loy set up a goal but in the 50th minute to the game, he suffered an injury following a collision with Jack Baird and was substituted, in a 3–1 loss against his former club, St Mirren. On 26 August 2017, he returned to the starting line–up after missing one match through injury, in a 4–1 loss against Queen of the South. However, Loy failed to replicate his form as he did at Falkirk in his first spell, due to his struggles of scoring goals and his own injury concerns. On 6 February 2018, Loy scored his first goal for the club, in a 3–1 win against Brechin City. At the end of the 2017–18 season, he left Falkirk by mutual consent, having scored just once in 26 appearances.

=== Dumbarton ===
After leaving Falkirk, Loy signed a two-year deal with Scottish League One side Dumbarton on 19 June 2018.

On 21 July 2018, he made his debut for the club in a Scottish League Cup against Kilmarnock and set up the Sons' second goal of the game, as they loss 4–2. His spell with Dumbarton was badly restricted by injuries, however, as Loy made just 12 appearances before being leaving the club a year into his two-year deal.

== International career ==
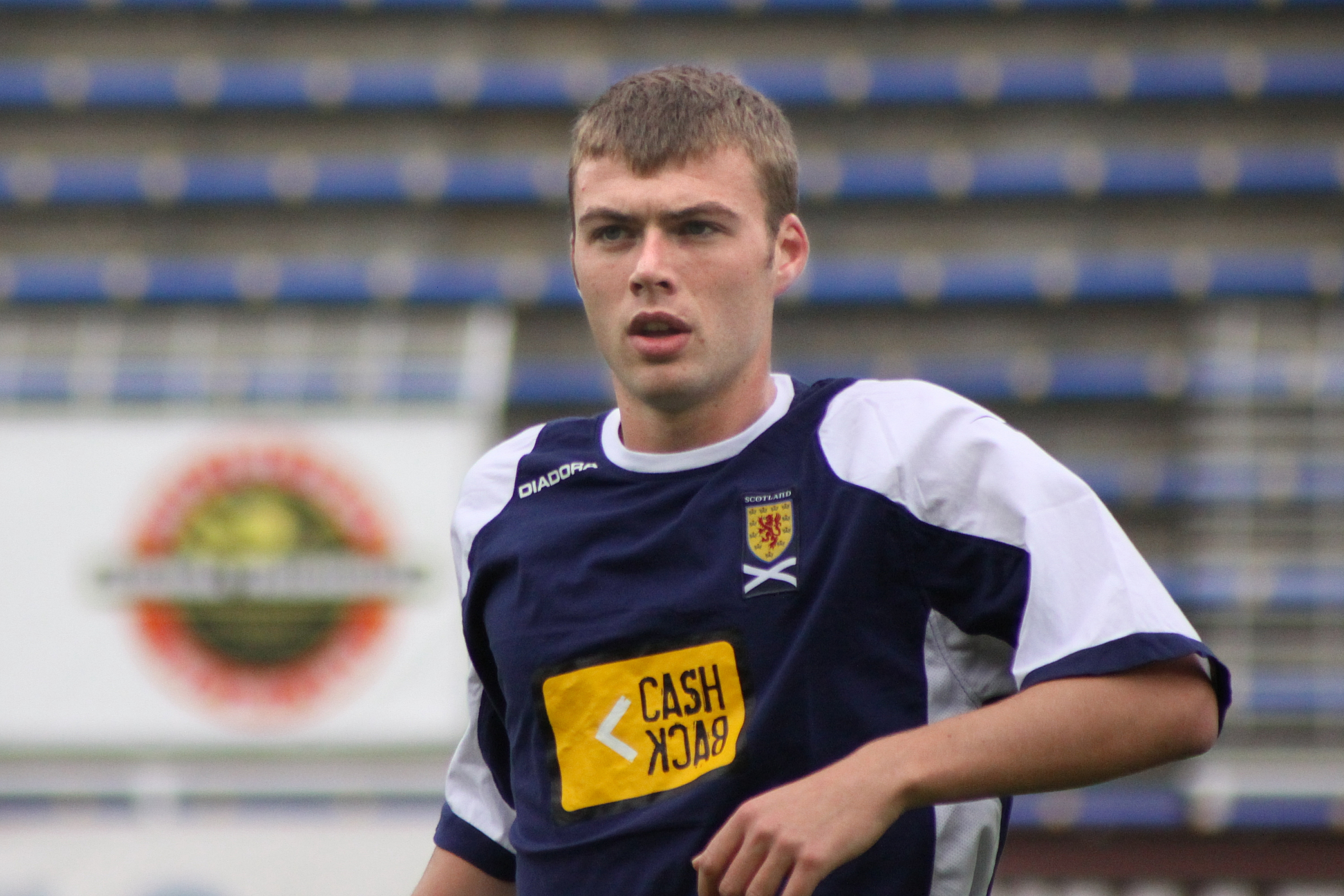
Loy with Scotland U21s in 2009.

On 11 November 2008, Loy was called up to the Scotland U21 for the first time. Seven days later on 18 November 2008, He made his Scotland U21 debut against Northern Ireland U21, coming on as a 68th-minute substitute, in a 3–1 loss. Following this, Loy gained four further caps for the U21 throughout 2009, including scoring his first goal, in a 4–0 win against Azerbaijan U21 on 15 November 2009.

== Personal life ==
After his football career ended, Loy became a pundit and broadcaster for BBC Scotland and Daily Record.

== Career statistics ==
As of 18:40 29 September 2018 (UTC)

Appearances and goals by club, season and competition
Club	Season	League			National Cup		League Cup		Other		Total	
Club	Season	Division	Apps	Goals	Apps	Goals	Apps	Goals	Apps	Goals	Apps	Goals
Rangers	2006–07	Scottish Premiership	0	0	0	0	0	0	0	0	0	0
Rangers	2007–08	Scottish Premiership	0	0	0	0	0	0	0	0	0	0
Rangers	2008–09	Scottish Premiership	1	0	0	0	0	0	0	0	1	0
Rangers	2009–10	Scottish Premiership	0	0	0	0	0	0	0	0	0	0
Rangers	2010–11	Scottish Premiership	1	0	0	0	0	0	0	0	1	0
Rangers	Total		2	0	0	0	0	0	0	0	2	0
Dunfermline Athletic (loan)	2008–09	Scottish Championship	18	3	5	0	0	0	0	0	23	3
St Mirren (loan)	2009–10	Scottish Premiership	8	0	0	0	0	0	0	0	8	0
Carlisle United	2010–11	League One	17	1	0	0	0	0	2 (Note: Appearances in Football League Trophy)	0	19	1
Carlisle United	2011–12	League One	20	3	2	1	2	0	1	0	25	4
Carlisle United	2012–13	League One	13	3	0	0	0	0	0	0	13	3
Carlisle United	Total		50	7	2	1	2	0	3	0	57	8
Falkirk	2013–14	Scottish Championship	34	20	1	0	3	0	5 (Note: Two appearances and a goal in Scottish Challenge Cup; three appearances and a goal in Premiership play-offs)	2	43	22
Falkirk	2014–15	Scottish Championship	26	9	4	0	2	1	3 (Note: Appearances in Scottish Challenge Cup)	2	35	12
Falkirk	Total		60	29	5	0	5	1	8	4	78	34
Dundee	2015–16	Scottish Premiership	29	9	4	0	0	0	0	0	33	9
Dundee	2016–17	Scottish Premiership	13	3	0	0	4	1	0	0	17	4
Dundee	Total		42	12	4	0	4	1	0	0	50	13
St Mirren (loan)	2016–17	Scottish Championship	13	5	2	0	0	0	2	2	17	7
Falkirk	2017–18	Scottish Championship	18	1	1	0	5	0	1	0	26	1
Dumbarton	2018–19	Scottish League One	8	0	0	0	2	0	2	0	12	0
Dumbarton	2019–20	Scottish League One	0	0	0	0	0	0	0	0	0	0
Career total			218	56	19	1	18	2	17	6	273	65

== Honours ==
Carlisle United

- Football League Trophy: 2010–11
