= Paul Thirlwell =

English footballer (born 1979)

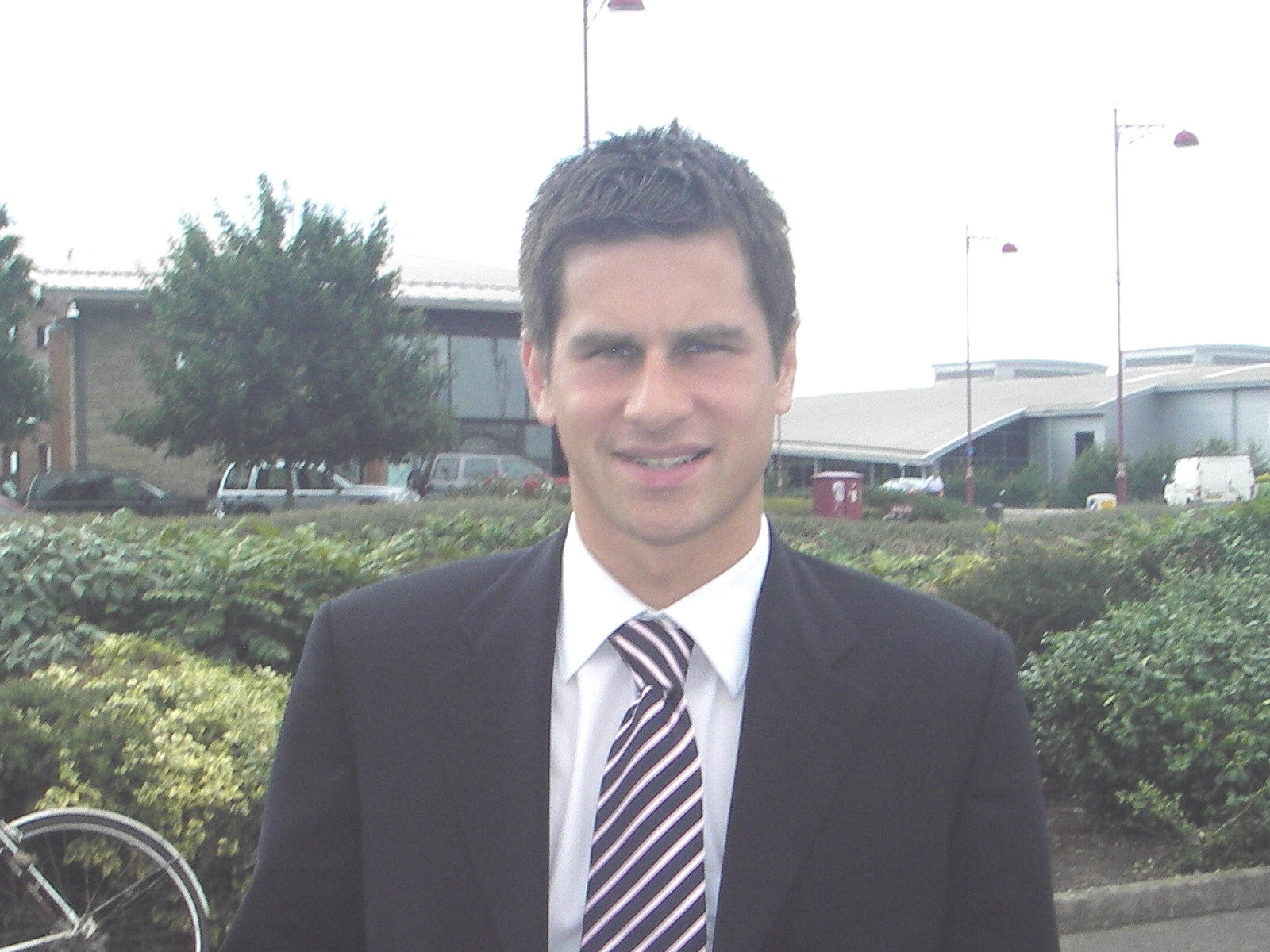

Personal information
- Date of birth: 13 February 1979 (age 47)
- Place of birth: Washington, England
- Position: Midfielder

Team information
- Current team: Harrogate Town (assistant manager)

Senior career*
Years	Team	Apps	(Gls)
1997–2004	Sunderland	77	(0)
1999	→ Swindon Town (loan)	12	(0)
2004–2005	Sheffield United	30	(1)
2005–2007	Derby County	21	(0)
2006	→ Carlisle United (loan)	14	(0)
2007–2015	Carlisle United	213	(7)
2015–2016	Harrogate Town	30	(1)
Total		401	(9)

International career
2001	England U21	1	(0)

Managerial career
- 2014–2015: Carlisle United (interim player-manager)
- 2016–: Harrogate Town (assistant manager)
- * Club domestic league appearances and goals

Paul Thirlwell (born 13 February 1979) is an English former professional footballer who is assistant manager at Harrogate Town. He is also a former England U21 international.

== Career ==
Thirlwell was born in Washington, Tyne and Wear, and began his career in Sunderland in August 1997. His first league game for Sunderland was against Tranmere Rovers on 22 August 1998. His only goal for Sunderland came against Luton Town on 19 September 2000 when Sunderland won 3–0 in the English League Cup. Thirlwell was on loan to Swindon Town from September 1999 to November 1999 and in those months he played 12 league games for the club from Wiltshire.

With Sunderland flying high in the Premiership, Thirlwell often found himself on the fringes of the first team, unable to break into the side ahead of established stars such as Don Hutchison and Stefan Schwarz. However, following the club's relegation from the top flight in 2003, Thirlwell went on to establish himself in the heart of Sunderland's midfield, making 33 league and cup appearances for the first team. Thirlwell even had a stint as captain after skipper Jason McAteer picked up an injury.

Despite a regular starting place during the first half of the season, injuries meant that Thirlwell missed a large chunk of the latter half of the campaign. Thirlwell also suffered a fractured skull during a reserve team match in April 2004, bringing a premature end to Thirlwell's Sunderland career.

With Thirlwell's contract up for renewal at the end of the season, manager Mick McCarthy decided not to retain him, and Thirlwell signed for Sheffield United on a free transfer in July 2004. His first appearance for this club came against Reading on 14 August 2004 and in a league game against Wolverhampton Wanderers on 27 November 2004 he scored his first goal for the club from South Yorkshire. Despite featuring 30 times for the club, Thirlwell played only one season for Sheffield United and on 5 August 2005 he signed for Derby County.

He made his debut for Derby on 6 August 2005 in a league game against Brighton & Hove Albion.

On 8 September 2006, Thirlwell joined Carlisle United on a 3-month loan from Derby County. after a lack of first team opportunities at Pride Park and his début for the Brunton Park team was on 9 September 2006 in a 1–1 draw against Northampton Town as a 54th minute sub. On 4 January 2007, Thirlwell re-joined Carlisle United on a permanent 2 1/2-year deal for an undisclosed fee. On 20 July 2007, Thirwell was named as Carlisle's new captain after the departure of Kevin Gray, manager Neil McDonald described Thirwell as the "prime candidate".

On 16 January 2009, Thirlwell scored his first league goal for Carlisle to equalise 2–2 against a second placed MK Dons team, Carlisle went on to win the match 3–2 through debutante Joe Anyinsah's goal.

On 2 May 2009, Thirlwell scored the winning goal against Millwall in Carlisle's final game of the season, a game Carlisle had to win to avoid relegation to League Two. The match ended Carlisle 2–0 Millwall. Thirlwell was released by the club at the end of the 2014–15 season, ending his nine-year association with the Cumbrian outfit.

On 28 May 2015, Thirlwell signed a contract with Harrogate Town.

== Career statistics ==
Appearances and goals by club, season and competition
Club	Season	League			FA Cup		League Cup		Other		Total	
Club	Season	Division	Apps	Goals	Apps	Goals	Apps	Goals	Apps	Goals	Apps	Goals
Sunderland	1998–99	First Division	2	0	0	0	3	0	0	0	5	0
Sunderland	1999–00	Premier League	8	0	1	0	0	0	0	0	9	0
Sunderland	2000–01	Premier League	5	0	0	0	2	1	0	0	7	1
Sunderland	2001–02	Premier League	14	0	1	0	1	0	0	0	16	0
Sunderland	2002–03	Premier League	19	0	1	0	2	0	0	0	22	0
Sunderland	2003–04	First Division	29	0	4	0	0	0	0	0	33	0
Sunderland	Total		77	0	7	0	8	1	0	0	92	1
Swindon Town (loan)	1999–00	First Division	12	0	0	0	0	0	0	0	12	0
Sheffield United	2004–05	Championship	30	1	3	0	3	0	0	0	36	1
Derby County	2005–06	Championship	21	0	2	0	0	0	0	0	23	0
Carlisle United	2006–07	League One	30	0	1	0	1	0	1	0	33	0
Carlisle United	2007–08	League One	13	0	0	0	2	0	1	0	16	0
Carlisle United	2008–09	League One	34	4	0	0	2	0	1	0	37	4
Carlisle United	2009–10	League One	28	1	0	0	2	0	2	0	32	1
Carlisle United	2010–11	League One	23	1	2	0	1	0	2	0	28	1
Carlisle United	2011–12	League One	26	1	2	0	2	0	0	0	30	1
Carlisle United	2012–13	League One	32	0	1	0	3	0	0	0	36	0
Carlisle United	2013–14	League One	27	0	3	0	2	0	1	0	33	0
Carlisle United	2014–15	League Two	18	0	0	0	1	0	2	0	21	0
Carlisle United	Total		231	7	9	0	16	0	10	0	266	7
Harrogate Town	2015–16	National League North	24	1	1	0	0	0	2	0	27	1
Harrogate Town	2016–17	National League North	6	0	1	0	0	0	1	0	8	0
Harrogate Town	Total		30	1	2	0	0	0	3	0	35	1
Career total			401	9	23	0	27	1	13	0	464	10

== Honours ==
Carlisle United

- Football League Trophy: 2010–11; runner-up: 2009–10
