= Lee Miller (footballer) =

Scottish footballer (born 1983)

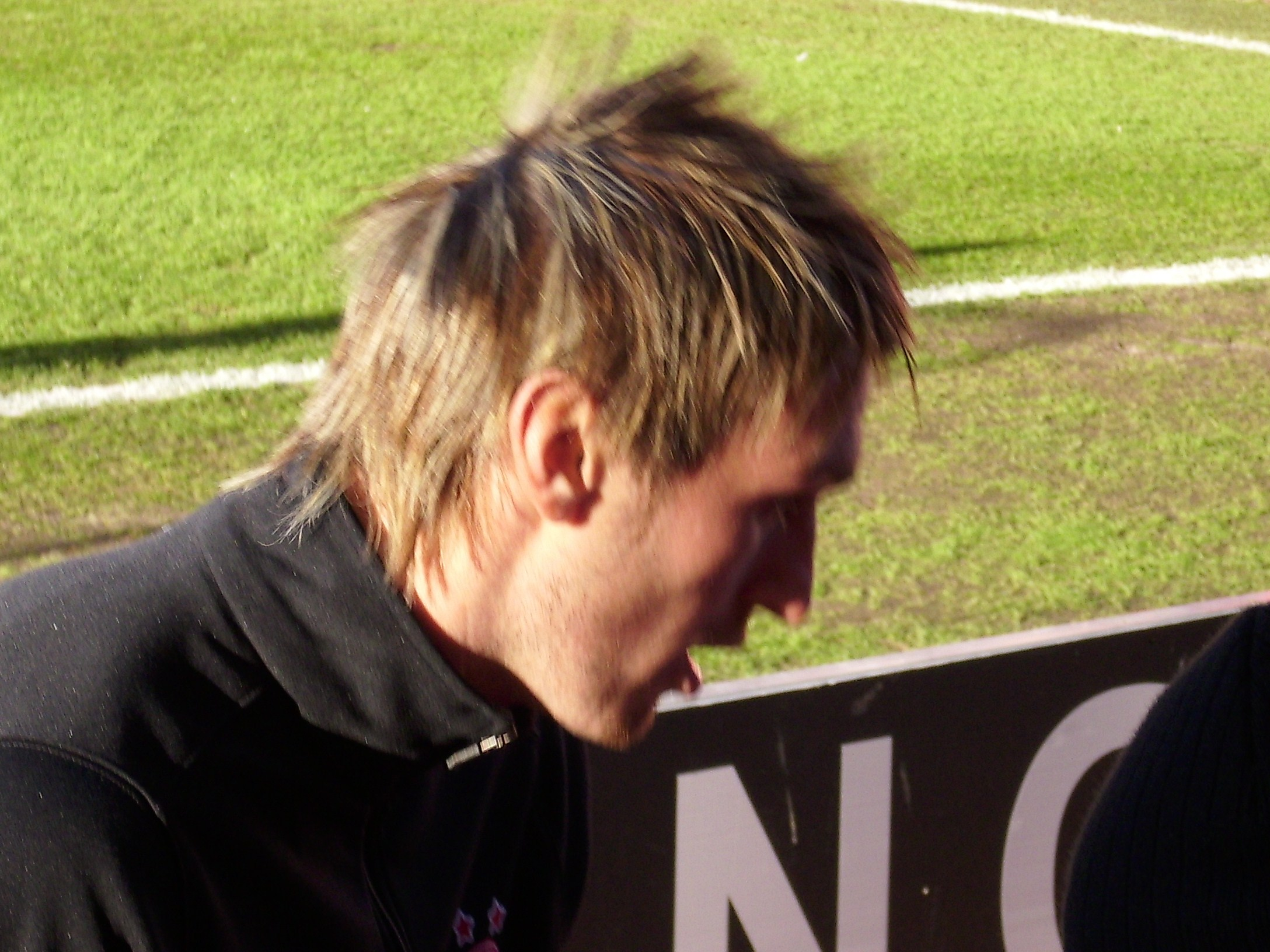
- Miller while at Aberdeen

Personal information
- Full name: Lee Adamson Miller
- Date of birth: 18 May 1983 (age 43)
- Place of birth: Lanark, Scotland
- Position: Striker

Senior career*
Years	Team	Apps	(Gls)
2000–2003	Falkirk	61	(27)
2003–2005	Bristol City	49	(8)
2005	→ Heart of Midlothian (loan)	18	(8)
2005–2006	Dundee United	37	(8)
2006–2010	Aberdeen	120	(29)
2010–2011	Middlesbrough	11	(0)
2010	→ Notts County (loan)	6	(2)
2011	→ Scunthorpe United (loan)	18	(1)
2011–2014	Carlisle United	90	(28)
2014–2015	Kilmarnock	19	(1)
2015–2018	Falkirk	72	(15)
2018–2019	Livingston	28	(3)
2020–2021	Falkirk	9	(1)
2021–2022	East Kilbride		

International career
2005–2006	Scotland B	3	(2)
2006–2009	Scotland	3	(0)

Managerial career
- 2019–2021: Falkirk (co-manager)
- * Club domestic league appearances and goals

Lee Adamson Miller (born 18 May 1983) is a Scottish football coach and former player who played as a striker.

Miller played at club level for Falkirk (three spells), Bristol City, Heart of Midlothian, Dundee United, Aberdeen, Middlesbrough, Notts County, Scunthorpe United, Carlisle United, Kilmarnock, Livingston and East Kilbride; he represented Scotland in three international matches during the late 2000s.

== Club career ==
Miller began his professional career with Falkirk, who were playing in the Scottish First Division at the time. He made his debut on 29 September 2001, in a 4–2 victory against Ross County. In March 2002, he was awarded the Scottish Football League Young Player of the Month award. At the end of the 2002–03 season, with Falkirk having won the First Division title, Miller was named as Scottish Football League Young Player of the Year. In July 2003, Aberdeen had a bid for Miller turned down. His agent then confirmed that he had handed in a transfer request.

His form with Falkirk attracted the attention of English side Bristol City, who paid £300,000 to secure his services in July 2003. Miller scored on his debut for Bristol City on 8 August 2003, as they beat Notts County 5–0. However, he failed to make a major impact and scored only eight goals in 42 games during the 2003–04 season. After playing in seven games with no goals during the 2004–05 season, Miller was transfer listed with an asking price of £50,000.

Miller went on loan to Scottish Premier League side Hearts in January 2005 and stayed with the Edinburgh club until the end of the season. He scored on his debut as Hearts beat Dundee United 3–2. He proved to be worth the £50,000 asking price, putting in several eye-catching performances for Hearts, scoring eight goals in 18 league appearances, including the opener in a memorable 2–0 away win over Celtic at Celtic Park. His form also won him the SPL Young Player of the Month award for February 2005. Hearts then attempted to secure Miller on a permanent deal, but his good form while on loan caused Bristol City to up their initial asking price.

In June 2005, Aberdeen and Hearts both had offers accepted by City, but Miller decided to join Dundee United for £225,000. As he had done at both Bristol City and Hearts, Miller scored on his debut for Dundee United in a 1–1 draw against Aberdeen.

At the start of the 2006–07 season, after refusing to play in a reserve match, United allowed Miller to join Aberdeen on a free transfer in August 2006. Miller was the subject of a police report in April 2007 after baring his backside in front of Dundee United supporters during a 4–2 defeat. Miller scored 13 goals in the 2007–08 season finishing as Aberdeen's top scorer and in May 2008, signed a two-year contract extension with the Pittodrie side. He scored his first goal of the season against Hearts at Pittodrie, and went on to score the only goal in a 1–0 win against Rangers. In March 2008, Miller was charged with driving dangerously at speeds of up to 120 mph. In September 2009, Miller was stripped of his licence, banned from driving for a year and fined £600. He was also ordered to sit an extended driving test before being allowed to regain his licence.

Miller was signed by Middlesbrough on 1 February 2010 for a fee of around £600,000. His time at Middlesbrough was short-lived however, as he only made 11 first-team league appearances for the club, scoring no goals. He spent most of the 2010–11 season out on loan. Firstly on 19 November 2010, he signed for Notts County on loan until 4 January 2011. On 28 January 2011, Miller joined Championship rivals Scunthorpe United in a loan deal until the end of the season. At Scunthorpe his only goal was the winner in a 3–2 win over Sheffield United.

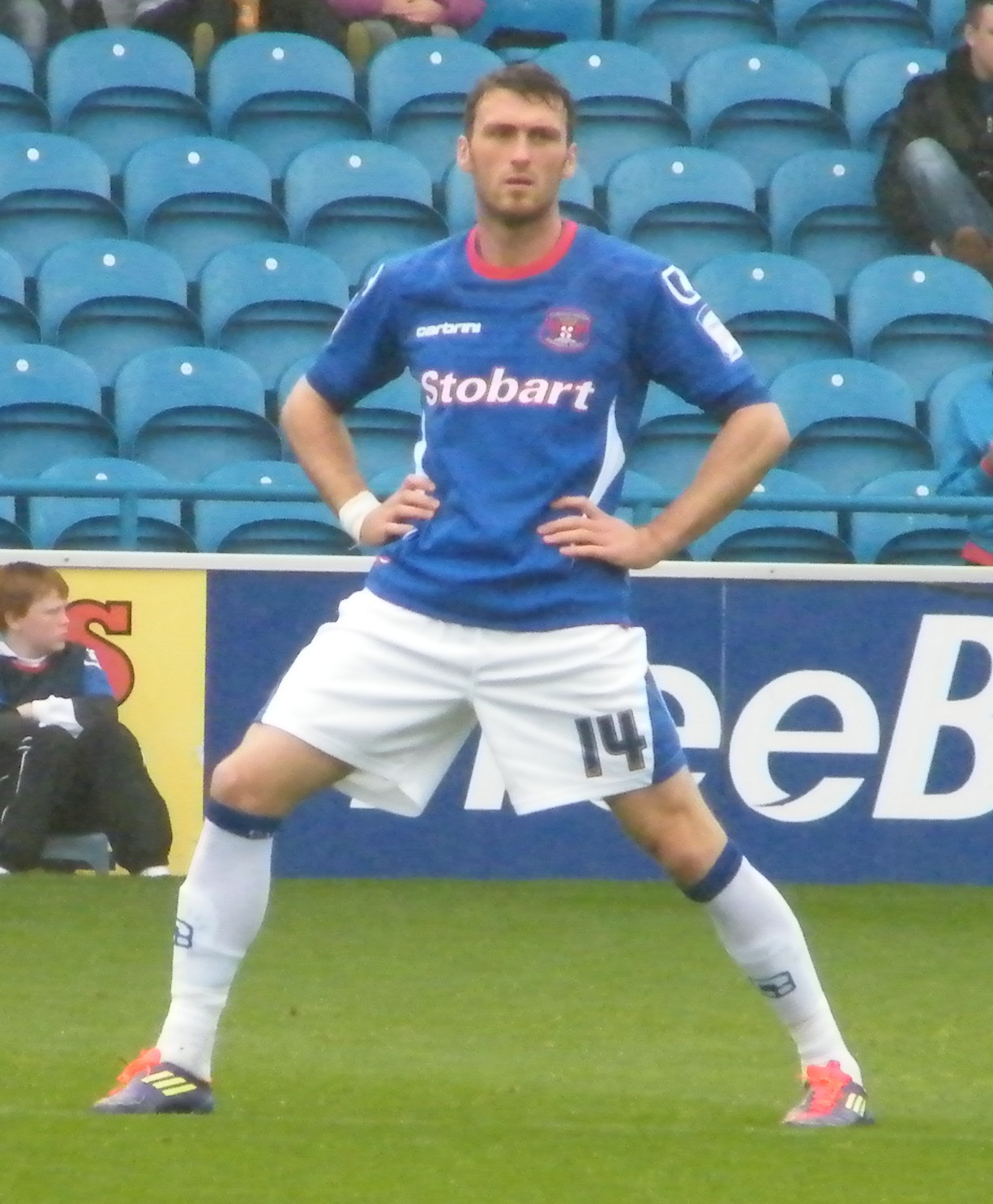
Miller playing for Carlisle United

On 23 August 2011, Miller signed a two-year contract with Carlisle United for an undisclosed fee. He scored two goals on his debut against Leyton Orient, which gave Carlisle a 2–1 victory. This was followed up with another goal in his first game at Brunton Park, a header against MK Dons. In January 2013 he was named Carlisle on the field captain. On 27 June 2013 Miller signed a new 12-month contract with Carlisle United, with the option of a further year. In May 2014 Miller, along with 10 other first team players, was released by Carlisle after the club's relegation to Football League Two.

Miller signed a two-year contract with Kilmarnock in July 2014. He made his debut on 26 August 2014, coming on as a substitute as Kilmarnock beat Ayrshire derby rivals Ayr United 1–0 in the Scottish League Cup. He scored his first goal for Kilmarnock on 14 March 2015, in a 1–0 win against St Mirren. At the end of the 2014–15 season, Miller was released by Kilmarnock.

On 17 August 2015, Miller signed for Falkirk for a second time, joining the club on a six-month contract. He was released by the club on 17 January 2018. One of his teammates during his return spell was Mark Kerr, with whom he had also played in his early years with the club (2000–03), as well as at Dundee United (2005–06) and Aberdeen (2008–10).

Two days after leaving Falkirk in January 2018, Miller signed for fellow Scottish Championship club Livingston. Miller left Livingston in November 2019 to take a coaching position at Falkirk.

Miller signed with East Kilbride as a player on 9 June 2021.

== International career ==
Miller has three caps for Scotland, the first came in May 2006, during his time at Dundee United, against Japan in the 2006 Kirin Cup and the others whilst with Aberdeen. He came on as a substitute against Argentina in a friendly in November 2008.

In September 2009, he was due to join up with the Scotland squad for the World Cup Qualifier against the Netherlands, but a hamstring injury ruled him out. He started the friendly match on 10 October against Japan in Yokohama.

== Coaching career ==
Miller left a playing contract with Livingston in November 2019 to take a coaching position with Falkirk, working with David McCracken. Their first match as Bairns manager came on 30 November 2019, in a 3–1 win against Stranraer. After a few games in interim charge of the team, McCracken and Miller were given control until the end of the 2019–20 season. They embarked a three match winning streak throughout January that saw them earn January's Manager of the Month. However, the season was curtailed because of the COVID-19 pandemic, with Falkirk finishing fourth place. By then, McCracken and Miller were able to invigorated the place and the team, only losing twice for the Bairns. On 3 April 2020, Falkirk announced that both managers were among the staff members to be placed on furlough leave.

At the start of the 2020–21 season, McCracken and Millar made ten signings for Falkirk to build the new squad, as they maintained the Bairns' unbeaten start in the first eight league matches to the season. As a result, McCracken and Millar were named November's Manager of the Month. They, once again, were named March's Manager of the Month after going on a three match unbeaten run. However, their joy were short–lived when McCracken and Miller were sacked by Falkirk on 21 April 2021. It came after when the Bairns loss three times, including a 1–0 "embarrassing" defeat against Peterhead.

== Personal life ==
Miller's wife died in 2012 from a brain tumour. He has four sons. As of 2025, the second oldest, Lennon, plays for Udinese and the Scotland national football team.

Lee Miller attended the Scottish Barbering School and retrained as a barber after the COVID-19 pandemic.

== Career statistics ==
=== Club ===
Appearances and goals by club, season and competition
Club	Season	League			National cup		League cup		Other		Total	
Club	Season	Division	Apps	Goals	Apps	Goals	Apps	Goals	Apps	Goals	Apps	Goals
Falkirk	2001–02	Scottish First Division	27	11	2	0	0	0	0	0	29	11
Falkirk	2002–03	Scottish First Division	34	16	4	0	3	1	3 (Note: Appearances in the Scottish Challenge Cup)	2	44	19
Falkirk	Total		61	27	6	0	3	1	3	2	73	30
Bristol City	2003–04	Second Division	42	8	2	0	3	1	1 (Note: 2004 Football League Second Division play-off final (wrongly listed as a League appearance on soccerbase"Bristol City 0-1 Brighton". BBC Sport. 30 May 2004.))	0	48	8
Bristol City	2004–05	League One	7	0	1	0	2	0	0	0	10	0
Bristol City	Total		49	8	3	0	5	1	1	0	58	8
Heart of Midlothian (loan)	2004–05	Scottish Premier League	18	8	4	3	1	0	0	0	23	11
Dundee United	2005–06	Scottish Premier League	34	8	1	0	1	0	2 (Note: Appearances in the UEFA Cup (One match not listed on Soccerbase: "Dundee United 2-2- Mypa 47". BBC Sport. 25 August 2005.))	0	38	8
Dundee United	2006–07	Scottish Premier League	3	0	0	0	1	0	0	0	4	0
Dundee United	Total		37	8	1	0	2	0	2	0	42	8
Aberdeen	2006–07	Scottish Premier League	32	4	2	0	0	0	0	0	34	4
Aberdeen	2007–08	Scottish Premier League	36	12	6	0	3	1	7 (Note: Appearances in the UEFA Cup)	0	52	13
Aberdeen	2008–09	Scottish Premier League	34	10	2	1	1	1	0	0	38	12
Aberdeen	2009–10	Scottish Premier League	18	3	1	1	1	0	2 (Note: Appearances in the UEFA Europa League)	0	22	4
Aberdeen	Total		120	29	11	2	5	2	9	0	145	33
Middlesbrough	2009–10	Championship	10	0	0	0	0	0	0	0	10	0
Middlesbrough	2010–11	Championship	1	0	0	0	1	0	0	0	2	0
Middlesbrough	2011–12	Championship	0	0	0	0	1	0	0	0	11	0
Middlesbrough	Total		11	0	0	0	2	0	0	0	13	0
Notts County (loan)	2010–11	League One	6	2	1	0	0	0	0	0	7	2
Scunthorpe United (loan)	2010–11	Championship	18	1	0	0	0	0	0	0	18	1
Carlisle United	2011–12	League One	33	14	2	1	0	0	1 (Note: Appearance in the Football League Trophy)	0	36	15
Carlisle United	2012–13	League One	23	9	0	0	1	0	0	0	24	9
Carlisle United	2013–14	League One	34	5	3	3	1	0	0	0	38	8
Carlisle United	Total		90	28	5	4	2	0	1	0	98	32
Kilmarnock	2014–15	Scottish Premiership	19	1	1	0	2	0	0	0	22	1
Falkirk	2015–16	Scottish Championship	29	6	1	3	1	0	4 (Note: One appearance in the Scottish Challenge Cup; three appearances and a goal in the Premiership play-offs)	1	35	10
Falkirk	2016–17	Scottish Championship	30	9	1	0	3	1	3 (Note: Two appearances in the Scottish Challenge Cup and one in the Premiership play-offs)	0	37	10
Falkirk	2017–18	Scottish Championship	13	0	0	0	5	1	0	0	18	1
Falkirk	Total		72	15	2	3	9	2	7	1	90	21
Livingston	2017–18	Scottish Championship	16	2	1	0	0	0	4 (Note: Appearances in the Premiership play-offs)	0	21	2
Livingston	2018–19	Scottish Premiership	9	0	0	0	3	1	0	0	12	1
Livingston	2019–20	Scottish Premiership	3	1	0	0	2	0	0	0	5	1
Livingston	Total		28	3	1	0	5	1	4	0	38	4
Falkirk	2019–20	Scottish League One	4	1	0	0	0	0	–		4	1
Falkirk	2020–21	Scottish League One	6	0	0	0	0	0	–		6	0
Falkirk	Total		10	1	0	0	0	0	0	0	10	1
East Kilbride	2021–22	Lowland Football League	0	0	0	0	0	0	–		35	10
Career total			539	131	35	12	34	7	27	3	603	145

== Managerial statistics ==
As of match played 20 April 2021

Managerial record by team and tenure
Team	From	To	Record				
Team	From	To	G	W	D	L	Win %
Falkirk (co-manager)	19 November 2019	21 April 2021	42	22	12	8	52.38

- initially caretaker. Made permanent on 13 December 2019.
- statistics includes the 3-0 forfeit win over Kilmarnock in the Scottish League Cup on Tuesday 6 October 2020.

== Honours ==
Falkirk

- Scottish Football League First Division: 2002–03

Scotland

- Kirin Cup: 2006

Individual

- Scottish Football League Young Player of the Month: March 2002
- Scottish Football League Young Player of the Year: 2002–03
- SPL Young Player of the Month: February 2005
- SPL player of the month: December 2008
