= Chris Chantler (footballer) =

English footballer (born 1990)

Personal information
- Full name: Christopher Steven Chantler
- Date of birth: 16 December 1990 (age 35)
- Place of birth: Stockport, England
- Height: 1.73 m (5 ft 8 in)
- Positions: Defender; midfielder

Team information
- Current team: Colne

Youth career
- 1997–2010: Manchester City

Senior career*
Years	Team	Apps	(Gls)
2010–2012	Manchester City	0	(0)
2011–2012	→ Carlisle United (loan)	0	(0)
2012–2014	Carlisle United	54	(0)
2014–2015	Kilmarnock	26	(0)
2016	Macclesfield Town	0	(0)
2016–2017	FC United of Manchester	55	(1)
2017–2018	Spennymoor Town	29	(0)
2018–2020	Ossett United	17	(1)
2020–	Colne	7	(0)
- * Club domestic league appearances and goals as of 21:32, 20 August 2020 (UTC)

Christopher Steven Chantler (born 16 December 1990) is an English footballer who plays as a defender or midfielder for Colne FC. He previously played for Spennymoor Town. He has previously played for Manchester City, Carlisle United, Kilmarnock and Macclesfield Town.

== Club career ==
=== Manchester City ===
Chantler first signed for Manchester City at the age of seventeen after being scouted by former City player Neil Young. Having graduated from the club's academy, Chantler had been playing for the Elite Development Squad for two seasons when he made his debut for the first team, coming on as a substitute in the final minutes of the Europa League game against Juventus on his 20th birthday, 16 December 2010.

At the time at Manchester City, Chantler wore number 53 shirt for the club. Chantler described his time at Manchester City as "crazy" and "ridiculous", as he didn't get first team opportunities for the club, which by his standard very harsh.

=== Carlisle United ===
On 23 November 2011, Chantler joined League One outfit Carlisle United on loan until 2 January 2012. He went on to impress manager Greg Abbott and secured a permanent switch to Carlisle United on 6 January 2012, signing an 18-month contract. However, Chantler ended his season with 12 appearances after a hamstring problem that ruled him out for the rest of the season. Despite being on the sideline, Chantler stated the club's supporters were supportive for him to settle.

Following his return in the pre-season, Chantler continued to be in the first team and spoke out in the interview of his frustration on his thigh injury. However, in early-February, Chantler ended his season with 25 appearances after ankle injury put him out for the remainder of the season. Despite his injury, Chantler signed a new contract with the club for another season. Shortly signing a new contract, Chantler stated that he now intending to focus on rehabilitating his ankle. Chantler expressed his frustration on his injury.

At the start of the season, Chantler had his second operation on his ankle injury, resulting him missing out start of the season. Four months later, Chantler returned to training and expressed positively on getting involved. After five months out, Chantler made his return for the club, in a match against Gillingham on 2 November 2013, making a start, in a 1–0 loss. He says he happy to be back making a return to the first team. Since making a return in the first team, Chantler had made his return in the first team and his first team increased following injuries of players.

At the end of the 2013–14 season, it announced that Chantler was among 11 players to be released by the club.

=== Kilmarnock ===
On 9 August 2014, Chantler signed for Scottish Premiership side Kilmarnock on a one-year contract.

He made his debut that day, as Kilmarnock drew 1–1 away to Dundee. Chantler then provided assist for Josh Magennis, in a 2–1 win over Ross County on 16 August 2014, followed up with another assist for Robbie Muirhead, in another win against Motherwell on 23 August 2014. Chantler continued to be in the first team, playing as a left-back until he suffered a knee injury that caused him to miss the remainder of the season.

After making 26 appearances for the club, Chantler was released at the end of the season.

=== Macclesfield Town ===
On 6 January 2016, it was announced that he had signed for Macclesfield Town.

=== FC United of Manchester ===
On 23 January 2016, it was announced that he had signed for National League North side FC United of Manchester. He made a goalscoring debut the same day at Broadhurst Park in a 6–1 win against Lowestoft Town. He was also made man of the match. He contributed in the second half of the season, to a mid-table finish respectively.

== Career statistics ==
As of match played 26 December 2017

Appearances and goals by club, season and competition
Club	Season	League			National Cup		League Cup		Other		Total	
Club	Season	Division	Apps	Goals	Apps	Goals	Apps	Goals	Apps	Goals	Apps	Goals
Manchester City	2010–11	Premier League	0	0	0	0	0	0	1 (Note: Appearance in the Europa League)	0	1	0
Carlisle United (loan)	2011–12	League One	0	0	1	0	0	0	0	0	1	0
Carlisle United	2011–12	League One	12	0	0	0	0	0	0	0	12	0
Carlisle United	2012–13	League One	25	0	2	0	3	0	1 (Note: Appearance in the Football League Trophy)	0	31	0
Carlisle United	2013–14	League One	17	0	0	0	0	0	0	0	17	0
Carlisle United	Carlisle total		54	0	2	0	3	0	1	0	60	0
Kilmarnock	2014–15	Scottish Premiership	26	0	1	0	2	0	—		29	0
FC United of Manchester	2015–16	National League North	18	1	0	0	—		0	0	18	1
FC United of Manchester	2016–17	National League North	37	0	0	0	—		0	0	37	0
FC United of Manchester	FC United of Manchester total		55	1	0	0	0	0	0	0	55	1
Spennymoor Town	2017–18	National League North	21	0	0	0	—		0	0	21	0
Career total			156	1	4	0	5	0	2	0	167	1
