= François Zoko =

Ivorian footballer

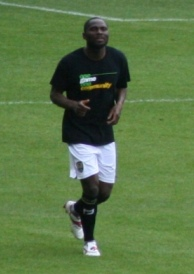
- François Zoko in August 2012.

Personal information
- Full name: Bernard François Dassise Zoko
- Date of birth: 13 September 1983 (age 43)
- Place of birth: Daloa, Ivory Coast
- Height: 1.82 m (6 ft 0 in)
- Position: Striker

Team information
- Current team: Burton Albion (Head of Academy Coaching)

Youth career
- –2000: C.O. Savigny-sur-Orge
- 2000–2001: Nancy

Senior career*
Years	Team	Apps	(Gls)
2001–2004	Nancy	70	(8)
2004–2006	Laval	60	(9)
2006–2008	Mons	55	(12)
2008–2009	Hacettepe Spor Kulübü	27	(1)
2010	KV Oostende	13	(3)
2010–2012	Carlisle United	88	(19)
2012–2013	Notts County	39	(7)
2013–2014	Stevenage	33	(10)
2014–2015	Blackpool	14	(1)
2014–2015	→ Bradford City (loan)	16	(1)
2015–2019	Yeovil Town	122	(28)
2019–2020	Grantham Town		
2020–2021	Newark		

International career
2003	Ivory Coast U-20, U-23		
- * Club domestic league appearances and goals as of 18:00, 30 January 2020 (UTC)

Bernard François Dassise Zoko (born 13 September 1983), known as François Zoko, is an Ivorian former professional footballer who is currently Head of Academy Coaching at Burton Albion.

== Career ==
=== Early career ===
Born in Daloa, Zoko began his career at youth team C.O. Savigny-sur-Orge and signed in 2000 for AS Nancy. He played four years at Nancy, making 70 appearances and scoring 8 goals, before signing in summer 2004 for Stade Lavallois. Zoko then moved to R.A.E.C. Mons in 2006, and played two seasons in the Jupiler League. After 55 games and scoring 11 goals, Zoko was contacted by several teams in the Jupiler League, but decided to join the Ankara club for a new challenge in the Süper Lig. Throughout his career, Zoko has been used as a striker or winger. Whilst at Hacettepe Spor, Zoko was also used as a central midfielder.

There were many off field problems at Hacettepe, which meant that Zoko finally left and joined his former R.A.E.C Mons manager at KV Oostende in January in order to play football again. At Oostende, Zoko played 11 games, scoring 4 goals and making 5 assists.

=== Carlisle United ===
Zoko was on trial with League One side Carlisle United ahead of the 2010–11 season, scoring in a 4–1 pre-season friendly victory against Kendal Town. After impressing during a two-week trial, he signed a permanent one-year contract with the club in July 2010.

Zoko made his debut for Carlisle in the club's first game of the 2010–11 season, playing 75 minutes in Carlisle's 2–0 win against Brentford. He received a standing ovation from the Carlisle United supporters when he was substituted, and manager Greg Abbott said there's "more to come" from Zoko. Zoko had a very good start to life in English football becoming a crowd and team favourite, and under 10 matches into his season, he was offered a new contract in order to keep Championship and Premiership teams away. He was linked to Wigan, Swansea and Burnley.

In June 2012, Zoko refused a new contract from Carlisle United stating his desire to play in the Championship. He scored 19 goals in 88 league appearances. In July 2012, it was reported that Sheffield United and Preston North End were interested in signing the free agent following his release from Carlisle United.

=== Notts County ===
On 3 August 2012, Zoko signed a two-year deal with Notts County. He made his competitive debut in the league against Crewe. He also scored his first goal for the club as they ran out 2–1 winners. He scored his second goal for the club just three days later against Hartlepool in a 2–0 win. Zoko came off the bench to score his fourth goal for Notts County, in a 4–0 victory over his old team Carlisle. He picked up the "Man of the Match" award in a 4–1 victory over Bury, after coming off the bench to score two goals. On 29 August 2013, Zoko left Notts County by mutual consent.

=== Stevenage ===
Following his departure from Notts County, Zoko signed a short-term deal with League One side Stevenage on 4 October, on a contract lasting until January 2014. He made a goalscoring debut for the club four days after signing, poking in Michael Doughty's shot to restore parity in an eventual 2–1 home win over Milton Keynes Dons in the Football League Trophy. In Stevenage's next match, Zoko scored twice in a 2–1 victory over Brentford at Broadhall Way, the club's first home league win of the season. He made it four goals in his first three games when he scored a late consolation strike in Stevenage's 2–1 loss at Walsall on 19 October. Three weeks later, he netted again, this time scoring twice in Stevenage's 2–1 win over Portsmouth in the FA Cup on 9 November, taking his seasonal goal tally to six. Three days later, Zoko scored in a 3–2 win over Leyton Orient in the Football League Trophy; his goal coming in just the third minute when he connected with Luke Freeman's inswinging cross. He took his goal tally for the season to ten when he scored in three consecutive matches towards the end of November and start of December, scoring in league defeats to Gillingham and Shrewsbury Town, before netting a headed goal in a 4–0 win over Stourbridge in the FA Cup second round. Zoko ended the year by scoring a late consolation strike in Stevenage's 4–1 loss away at Bristol City, curling the ball into the goal with a first-time finish after good work from Luke Freeman. He scored in the club's first game of 2014, the final game before Zoko's short-term contract was set to expire, a 3–2 win away at Championship side Doncaster Rovers in the FA Cup. Just three days later, on 7 January 2014, Zoko signed a contract to remain at Stevenage for the rest of the 2013–14 season.

In 40 appearances for Stevenage, he scored 16 goals.

On 17 May 2014, Zoko was released by Stevenage.

=== Blackpool ===
On 15 August 2014, Zoko signed for Championship club Blackpool on a one-year contract. He made his debut for the club the next day as a second-half substitute. He scored his first goal for Blackpool in a 1–0 win over Cardiff City on 3 October 2014.

On 22 November 2014, Zoko joined Bradford City on loan until 17 January 2015. He scored his first goal for Bradford in a 1–0 win over Crawley Town on 3 March 2015.

=== Yeovil Town ===
On 21 November 2015, Zoko signed for League Two side Yeovil Town on a short-term contract. Having scored four goals since signing for Yeovil, on 21 January 2015, he extended his contract until the end of the season. At the end of the 2018–19 season, Zoko was released by Yeovil following the club's relegation from the Football League.

=== Grantham Town ===
In September 2019, Zoko joined Northern Premier League Premier Division side Grantham Town as a player/first-team coach, as well as taking up a Football in the Community role.

== International career ==
Zoko has been capped for Ivory Coast at U-20 level, and played at 2003 FIFA World Youth Championship alongside Everton striker Arouna Koné and has also played for Ivory Coast at U-23 level.

== Career statistics ==
As of match played 25 January 2020.

Appearances and goals by club, season and competition
Club	Season	League			National Cup		League Cup		Other		Total	
Club	Season	Division	Apps	Goals	Apps	Goals	Apps	Goals	Apps	Goals	Apps	Goals
Nancy	2001–02	Division 2	24	3	0	0	1	0	—		25	3
Nancy	2002–03	Ligue 2	28	2	0	0	1	0	—		29	2
Nancy	2003–04	Ligue 2	19	3	0	0	1	0	—		20	3
Nancy	Total		71	8	0	0	3	0	—		74	8
Stade Lavallois	2004–05	Ligue 2	27	7	0	0	1	0	—		28	7
Stade Lavallois	2005–06	Ligue 2	33	2	0	0	2	0	—		35	2
Stade Lavallois	Total		60	9	0	0	3	0	—		63	9
Mons	2006–07	Belgian First Division	23	4	0	0	—		—		23	4
Mons	2007–08	Belgian First Division	32	7	2	0	—		—		34	7
Mons	Total		55	11	2	0	—		—		57	11
Hacettepe	2008–09	Süper Lig	27	1	1	0	—		—		28	1
KV Oostende	2009–10	Belgian Second Division	13	3	0	0	—		—		13	3
Carlisle United	2010–11	League One	44	6	3	3	1	0	5 (Note: Appearance(s) in Football League Trophy)	1	53	10
Carlisle United	2011–12	League One	44	13	2	0	2	0	1	1	49	14
Carlisle United	Total		88	19	5	3	3	0	6	2	102	24
Notts County	2012–13	League One	38	7	3	1	1	0	2	0	44	8
Notts County	2013–14	League One	1	0	0	0	0	0	0	0	1	0
Notts County	Total		39	7	3	1	1	0	2	0	45	8
Stevenage	2013–14	League One	33	10	4	4	0	0	3	2	41	16
Blackpool	2014–15	Championship	14	1	0	0	0	0	—		14	1
Bradford City	2014–15	League One	16	1	5	0	0	0	0	0	21	1
Yeovil Town	2015–16	League Two	25	7	3	1	0	0	1	0	29	8
Yeovil Town	2016–17	League Two	34	8	2	1	0	0	4 (Note: Appearances in EFL Trophy)	4	40	13
Yeovil Town	2017–18	League Two	38	13	4	1	1	0	6	1	49	15
Yeovil Town	2018–19	League Two	26	0	1	0	0	0	1	0	28	0
Yeovil Town	Total		122	28	10	3	1	0	12	5	145	36
Career total			538	98	30	11	11	0	23	9	601	118

== Honours ==
Carlisle United

- Football League Trophy: 2011
