= Marco Gbarssin =

Footballer (born 1984)

Marc-Antoine Gbarssin
Personal information
- Date of birth: 11 December 1984 (age 41)
- Place of birth: Bordeaux, France
- Height: 1.81 m (5 ft 11 in)
- Position: Defensive midfielder

Youth career
- 1996–2002: Bordeaux

Senior career*
Years	Team	Apps	(Gls)
2002–2004	Grenoble	0	(0)
2005–2006	SK Loombeek Liederkerke	21	(0)
2006–2007	Virton	43	(1)
2007–2010	Royal Antwerp	60	(3)
2010	Bologna	0	(0)
2010	FC Fredericia	6	(1)
2010–2011	Carlisle United	0	(0)
2011	→ Walsall (loan)	9	(0)
2011–2012	Eendracht Aalst	14	(0)
2012–2013	KRC Waregem	17	(1)
2013–2014	CS Louhans-Cuiseaux	17	(1)
Total		187	(6)

International career
2011	Central African Republic	1	(0)
- * Club domestic league appearances and goals

Marc-Antoine Gbarssin (born 11 December 1984) is a former professional footballer who plays as a defensive midfielder. Born in France, he made one appearance for the Central African Republic national team.

== Club career ==
=== Royal Antwerp ===
Gbarssin was born in Bordeaux. In 2007, he signed a two-year contract with Royal Antwerp, with the option of an extra year. After two successful seasons with the Belgian club, he attracted the attention of several top-flight French and Belgian clubs. Italian club Bologna submitted a bid for Gbarssin, but Antwerp did not allow him to leave. This led to several off-field problems which meant that Gbarssin was left on the bench for the majority of the 2009–10 season.

=== Bologna ===
Gbarssin was released in the summer of 2010 and joined Bologna for the whole of pre-season. The club was subsequently acquired by new owners, who cancelled the contracts of all the players signed in the summer by the previous management.

=== FC Fredericia ===
Finding himself without a contract, Gbarssin signed a short-term deal with Danish club FC Fredericia in order to get some first-team football and maintain match fitness.

=== Carlisle United ===
On 31 December 2010, Gbarssin signed a one-month contract with Carlisle United. Carlisle manager Greg Abbott told the club website:

"Marco has done really well during the last three weeks and he's one we've managed to sneak under the radar. He's played to a good standard abroad and was recommended to me by a good friend of mine who told me he was worth a look. He's a really tough, solid but capable player who rarely gives the ball away. This month will show us whether he is capable of kicking on to the next level and if he manages that, he'll reward himself by earning a longer contract."

International clearance was received on 6 January 2011 and on 31 January Gbarssin signed a deal to stay at Carlisle until the end of the season.

In a surprise move, on 4 March 2011 Gbarssin joined Carlisle's League 1 rivals Walsall on a loan deal until the end of April.

Gbrassin was released by Carlisle United in May 2011.

== International career ==
Gbarssin made his debut for the Central African Republic national team on 10 August 2011 in a friendly match against Malta, coming on as a 65th minute sub for Armel Kazangba.
