= Peter Murphy (footballer, born 1980) =

Irish football player and coach (born 1980)

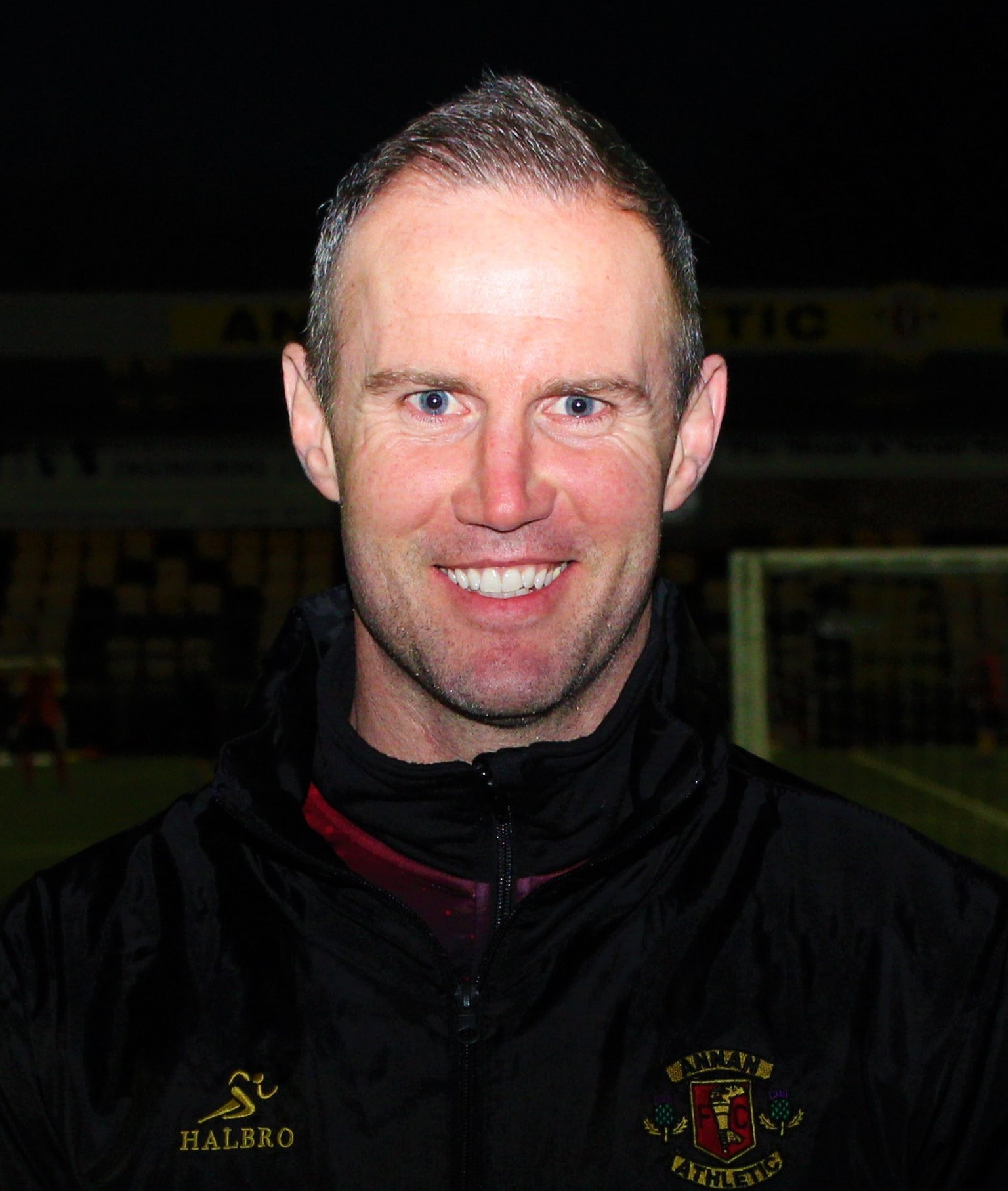
- Murphy as manager of Annan Athletic in 2019

Personal information
- Full name: Peter Michael Murphy
- Date of birth: 27 October 1980 (age 46)
- Place of birth: Dublin, Ireland
- Position: Defender

Youth career
- Blackburn Rovers

Senior career*
Years	Team	Apps	(Gls)
1999–2001	Blackburn Rovers	0	(0)
2000–2001	→ Halifax Town (loan)	21	(1)
2001–2013	Carlisle United	417	(23)
2013–2014	Celtic Nation		
2014–2017	Ayr United	64	(1)
2017–2019	Annan Athletic	6	(1)

International career^{‡}
1998–1999	Republic of Ireland U19	7	(0)
2000	Republic of Ireland U21	2	(0)
2007	Republic of Ireland	1	(0)

Managerial career
- 2017–2024: Annan Athletic
- 2024–2026: Queen of the South
- * Club domestic league appearances and goals as of 17:01, 8 December 2017 (UTC) ‡ National team caps and goals as of 26 May 2007 (UTC)

Peter Michael Murphy (born 27 October 1980) is an Irish football player and coach, who was most recently the manager of Scottish League One club Queen of the South.

Murphy played as a defender, but also operated through midfield. He currently holds the club record at Carlisle United for the most appearances for the club as an outfield player with over 400, before being released after 12 years of service in 2013. He later played for Scottish clubs Ayr United and Annan Athletic, and then became Annan's manager. After seven seasons in that position he was appointed manager of Queen of the South in May 2024.

== Playing career ==
=== Club ===
Murphy played his youth football at St Josephs Boys AFC football club in Dublin. He then went on to play for Blackburn Rovers, Halifax Town (on loan, scoring his first career goal in a match against Kidderminster Harriers) and Carlisle United.

While at Brunton Park Murphy started 400+ games and scored the winning goal in the Conference National Playoff Final 2005, which ensured The Cumbrians return to the Football League. On their return, Murphy also played a major part in the team that won the League Two title in 2006 and that narrowly missed out on the League One play-offs in 2007. Murphy was out of contract at the end of the 2006–07 season initially rejecting an offer of a new contract. In July 2007, Murphy accepted a new contract from Carlisle United, signing a two-year contract. On 3 April 2011, Murphy scored the winning goal in the final of the Football League Trophy at Wembley Stadium against Brentford. Two days before the match, Murphy's partner Lisa gave birth to a baby son.

Murphy has a record for most games of any outfield player in the Carlisle United's history. On 7 October there was a match to mark his 10+ years of service with the Cumbrian club, in which a host of ex-Carlisle superstars took to the field on Brunton Park, with Grant Holt, Danny Graham, Keiren Westwood and Ian Harte all making the trip to Cumbria for the occasion to celebrate his loyalty and service to Carlisle United.

At the end of the 2012–13 season, Murphy was released by Carlisle. Five Months after his release from Carlisle United, Murphy joined Carlisle based non-league side Celtic Nation.

On 24 July 2014, Murphy signed for Scottish League One club Ayr United. He scored his first goal for the club in a 3–2 defeat to Airdrieonians. Murphy spent three seasons with the Honest Men, before being released on 10 May 2017 after the club's relegation from the Scottish Championship.

=== International ===
Murphy is a former Ireland under-19 and under-21 international, playing in the UEFA Under-19 Championships in 1999. In May 2007, Murphy received his first call up to the senior Republic of Ireland squad for the two-game American tour against Ecuador and Bolivia. Murphy's international début came against Bolivia when he started the match before being substituted at half time. This appearance meant he became first Carlisle United player to win full international honours while with the Brunton Park club since Eric Welsh, who won four caps for Northern Ireland in the 1960s.

== Managerial career ==
Murphy's first managerial appointment came with Scottish League Two club Annan Athletic, where he was appointed player/manager on 2 June 2017.

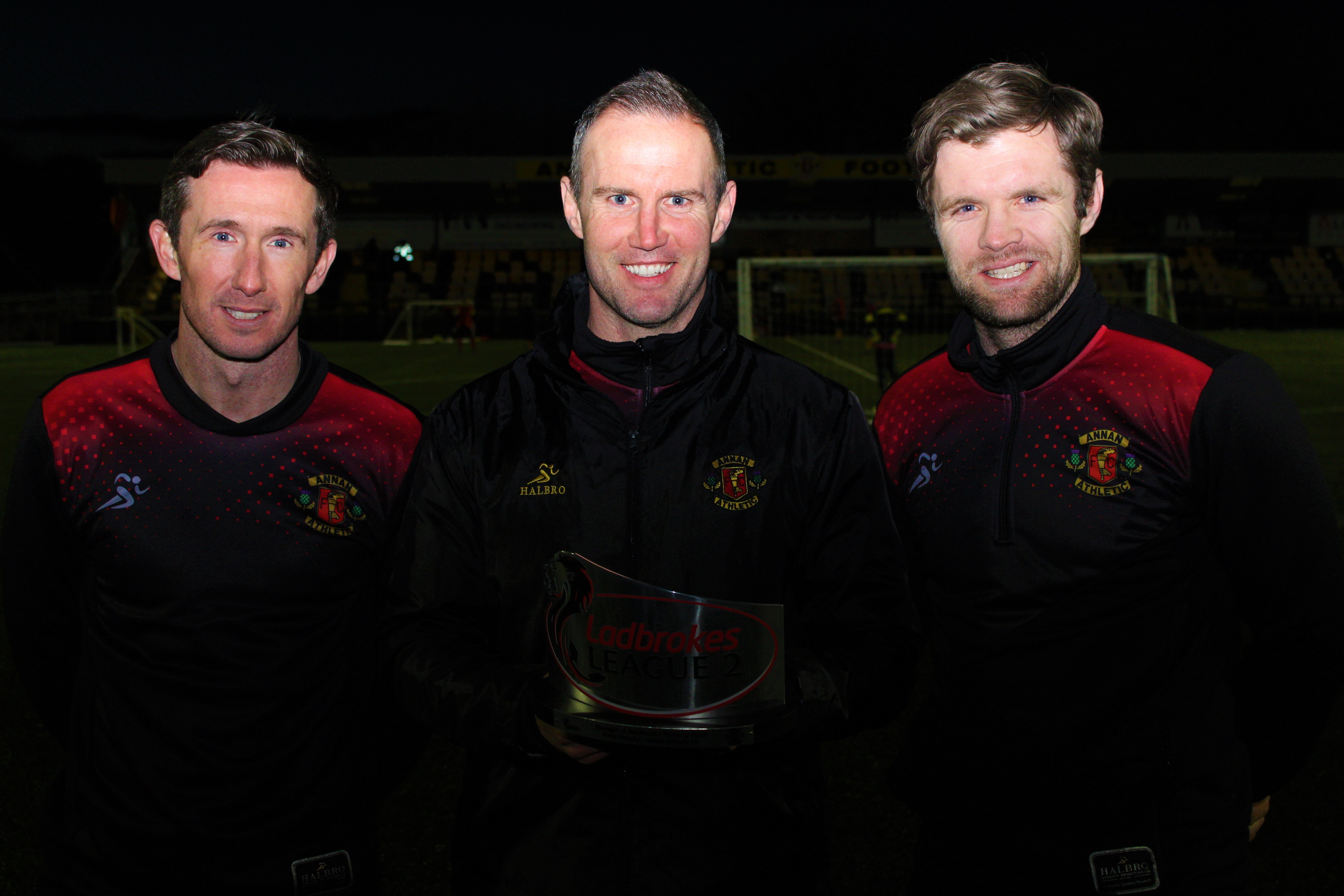
Murphy (middle) receiving Manager of the Month for February in 2019

Peter Murphy won the Ladbrokes Manager of the Month in August 2018 and won it again alongside Chris Johnston who won Player of the Month in February 2019. He won promotion to League 1 with Annan in May 2023 beating Clyde 5–2 on aggregate.

On 9 May 2024, Annan Athletic announced that Murphy had left the club to join fellow Scottish League One club and local rivals, Queen of the South.

On 11 May 2026, Queen of the South announced that Murphy's contract would not be renewed for the forthcoming season, having failed to get the club back to the Scottish Championship under his tenure.

== Career statistics ==
=== Managerial record ===
As of 9 May 2026

Team	From	To	Record				
Team	From	To	G	W	D	L	Win %
Annan Athletic	2 June 2017	4 May 2024	294	110	67	117	37.41
Queen of the South	9 May 2024	9 May 2026	96	38	23	35	39.58
Total			390	148	90	152	37.9

== Honours ==
=== Player ===
Carlisle United

- Football League Two: 2005–06
- Football League Trophy: 2010–11; runner-up: 2002–03, 2005–06, 2009–10

=== Manager ===
Annan Athletic

- Scottish League One play-offs: 2023
