= Alessio Bugno =

Italian footballer (born 1990)

Personal information
- Date of birth: 27 March 1990 (age 36)
- Place of birth: Magenta, Lombardy, Italy
- Height: 1.80 m (5 ft 11 in)
- Position: Left back

Team information
- Current team: RG Ticino

Youth career
- 2004–2007: Aldini Bariviera
- 2007–2008: Renate
- 2008: → AlbinoLeffe (loan)

Senior career*
| Years | Team | Apps | (Gls) |
| 2008–2009 | Pro Sesto | 9 | (0) |
| 2010 | Folgore Caratese | 16 | (1) |
| 2010–2012 | Monza | 40 | (1) |
| 2012 | Carlisle United | 2 | (0) |
| 2013 | Monza | 8 | (0) |
| 2013–2016 | Lecco | 101 | (4) |
| 2016–2018 | Inveruno | 62 | (5) |
| 2018–2019 | Pro Sesto | 29 | (3) |
| 2019–2020 | Romentinese Cerano | | |
| 2020–2021 | RG Ticino | 6 | (0) |
| 2021–2023 | Sant'Angelo | 34 | (1) |
| 2023– | RG Ticino | 18 | (2) |
- * Club domestic league appearances and goals as of 20 February 2023

Alessio Bugno (born 27 March 1990) is an Italian footballer who plays for Serie D club RG Ticino. He is the son of the cyclist Gianni Bugno, World Champion in the 90s.

== Biography ==
Born in Magenta, Lombardy, Bugno was loaned to AlbinoLeffe in January 2008 from Renate. In January 2009 he left for Lega Pro Seconda Divisione club Pro Sesto. In August 2010 he left for Prima Divisione club Monza as a free agent where he played most of the time as a left back or left midfielder. At the end of the season Bugno decided to leave Monza as he had offers from Serie B teams in Italy. However, he rejected the Serie B offers and instead on 5 July 2012 joined English league 1 side Carlisle United on a trial. On 27 July in a match against St Mirren, Bugno earned himself a standing ovation from the fans.

On 1 August 2012 Bugno signed a two-year deal with Carlisle United. Fans of Carlisle are already making him a fan favourite for his attacking style of play shown in pre-season. Alessio made his professional debut on 11 August 2012 in a 1–0 win against Accrington Stanley in the Football League Cup.

On 11 December 2012 it was revealed that Alessio was unhappy with life at Carlisle and had flown back to Italy to consider his future.

On 31 January 2013. It was revealed that Alessio had parted ways with Carlisle United upon mutual agreement and signed again with his former club Monza At the end of the season, expired the contract, signature with the Lecco.

Ahead of the 2019–20 season, Bugno joined Italian club Romentinese Cerano & C. of Galliate.
