= 2007–08 Carlisle United F.C. season =

Carlisle United F.C.
2007–08 season
- Chairman: Andrew Jenkins
- Manager: Neil McDonald (to 13 August) Greg Abbott (caretaker) John Ward (from October)
- League One: 4th
- FA Cup: Second round
- League Cup: First round
- Football League Trophy: Quarter-final

For the 2007–08 season, Carlisle United F.C. competed in Football League One.

== Results & fixtures ==
=== English League One ===
==== League table ====
Pos	Team	Pld	W	D	L	GF	GA	GD	Pts	Promotion, qualification or relegation
2	Nottingham Forest (P)	46	22	16	8	64	32	+32	82	Promotion to Football League Championship
3	Doncaster Rovers (O, P)	46	23	11	12	65	41	+24	80	Qualification for League One play-offs (Note: Four teams play for one spot and promotion to the Football League Championship.)
4	Carlisle United	46	23	11	12	64	46	+18	80	Qualification for League One play-offs
5	Leeds United	46	27	10	9	72	38	+34	76 (Note: Leeds deducted 15 points for failure to comply with rules on insolvency.)	Qualification for League One play-offs
6	Southend United	46	22	10	14	70	55	+15	76	Qualification for League One play-offs

Updated to match(es) played on 3 May 2008. Source: The Football League
Rules for classification: 1) points; 2) goal difference; 3) number of goals scored.
(O) Play-off winners; (P) Promoted

==== Matches ====
Match Day	Date	Opponent	H/A	Score	Carlisle United Scorer(s)	League Position	Attendance	Report
1	11 August	Walsall	A	1–1				
2	18 August	Oldham Athletic	H	1–0				
3	25 August	Huddersfield Town	A	2–0				
4	1 September	Cheltenham Town	H	1–0				
5	8 September	Tranmere Rovers	H	0–1				
6	14 September	Swansea City	A	1–2				
7	22 September	Bristol Rovers	H	1–1				
8	29 September	Bournemouth	A	3–1				
9	2 October	Hartlepool United	A	2–2				
10	6 October	Millwall	H	4–0				
11	13 October	Yeovil Town	A	1–2				
12	20 October	Gillingham	H	2–0				
13	27 October	Southend United	A	1–0				
14	3 November	Leeds United	H	3–1				
15	6 November	Luton Town	A	0–0				
16	24 November	Brighton & Hove Albion	A	2–2				
17	4 December	Swindon Town	H	3–0				
18	8 December	Northampton Town	A	2–2				
19	15 December	Leyton Orient	H	1–0				
20	26 December	Tranmere Rovers	A	0–2				
21	29 December	Bristol Rovers	A	0–3				
22	1 January	Hartlepool United	H	4–2				
23	5 January	Port Vale	H	3–2				
24	12 January	Doncaster Rovers	A	0–1				
25	19 January	Crewe Alexandra	H	1–0				
26	25 January	Cheltenham Town	A	0–1				
27	29 January	Oldham Athletic	A	0–2				
28	2 February	Walsall	H	2–0				
29	9 February	Port Vale	A	1–1				
30	12 February	Huddersfield Town	H	2–1				
31	23 February	Doncaster Rovers	H	1–0				
32	26 February	Crewe Alexandra	A	1–0				
33	3 March	Nottingham Forest	A	1–0				
34	8 March	Brighton & Hove Albion	H	2–0				
35	11 March	Luton Town	H	2–1				
36	15 March	Swindon Town	A	2–2				
37	22 March	Leyton Orient	A	3–0				
38	24 March	Northampton Town	H	2–0				
39	29 March	Gillingham	A	0–0				
40	1 April	Nottingham Forest	H	0–2				
41	5 April	Yeovil Town	H	2–1				
42	8 April	Swansea City	H	0–0				
43	12 April	Leeds United	A	2–3				
44	19 April	Southend United	H	1–2				
45	26 April	Millwall	A	0–3				
46	3 May	Bournemouth	H	1–1				

=== Football League play-offs ===
Round	Date	Opponent	H/A	Score	Carlisle United Scorer(s)	Attendance	Report
SF L1	12 May	Leeds United	A	2–1		36,297	
SF L2	15 May	Leeds United	H	0–2		12,873	

=== English League Cup ===
Round	Date	Opponent	H/A	Score	Carlisle United Scorer(s)	Attendance	Report
1	14 August	Bury	A	1–0			
2	28 August	Coventry City	H	0–2			

=== FA Cup ===
Round	Date	Opponent	H/A	Score	Carlisle United Scorer(s)	Attendance	Report
1	10 November	Grimsby Town	H	1–1			
1R	20 November	Grimsby Town	A	0–1			

=== Football League Trophy ===
Round	Date	Opponent	H/A	Score	Carlisle United Scorer(s)	Attendance	Report
2	6 October	Chester City	A	4–2			
QF	13 November	Stockport Country	H	0–3		3,395	
