= 2010 Football League Trophy final =

2010 Football League Trophy Final (Johnstone's Paint Trophy)
- Event: 2009–10 Football League Trophy
Carlisle United	Southampton
1	4
- Date: 28 March 2010
- Venue: Wembley Stadium, London
- Man of the Match: Rickie Lambert (Southampton)
- Referee: Scott Mathieson (Cheshire)
- Attendance: 73,476

The 2010 Football League Trophy Final was the 27th final of the domestic football cup competition for teams from Football Leagues One and Two, the Football League Trophy. The final was played at Wembley Stadium in London on 28 March 2010. The match was contested between Carlisle United and Southampton. Southampton won the match 4–1 to give them their first silverware since winning the 1976 FA Cup.

== Match details ==
28 March 2010
13:30 BST

Carlisle United	1–4	Southampton
Madine 84'	Report	Lambert 15' (pen.); Lallana 44'; Waigo 50'; Antonio 60'

Wembley Stadium, London
Attendance: 73,476
Referee: Scott Mathieson (Cheshire)

Carlisle United	Southampton

GK	1	(England) Adam Collin
RB	21	(Republic of Ireland) Richard Keogh	(yellow card) 45+1'
CB	6	(Republic of Ireland) Peter Murphy	(yellow card) 14'
CB	14	(Republic of Ireland) Ian Harte
LB	3	(England) Evan Horwood
DM	8	(Republic of Ireland) Graham Kavanagh		(substituted off) 73'
DM	11	(England) Paul Thirlwell (c)		(substituted off) 79'
AM	25	(England) Adam Clayton
RW	4	(England) Marc Bridge-Wilkinson		(substituted off) 61'
CF	9	(Scotland) Scott Dobie
LW	10	(England) Matty Robson
Substitutes:
GK	40	(England) Lenny Pidgeley
DF	23	(Northern Ireland) Tony Kane
MF	7	(England) Joe Anyinsah		(substituted on) 61'
MF	12	(England) Tom Taiwo		(substituted on) 79'
FW	28	(England) Gary Madine		(substituted on) 73'
Manager:
(England) Greg Abbott

GK	1	(England) Kelvin Davis
RB	2	(England) Dan Harding
CB	6	(Tunisia) Radhi Jaïdi	(substituted off) 90+2'
CB	12	(Portugal) José Fonte
LB	18	(England) Joseph Mills
RM	37	(England) Michail Antonio
CM	10	(England) Paul Wotton	(substituted off) 85'
CM	14	(England) Dean Hammond (c)
LM	20	(England) Adam Lallana
CF	7	(England) Rickie Lambert
CF	9	(Senegal) Papa Waigo	(substituted off) 76'
Substitutes:
GK	28	(Poland) Bartosz Białkowski
DF	5	(England) Chris Perry	(substituted on) 90+2'
MF	8	(England) Simon Gillett	(substituted on) 76'
MF	23	(Wales) Lloyd James
FW	38	(Republic of Ireland) David Connolly	(substituted on) 85'
Manager:
(England) Alan Pardew

MATCH OFFICIALS

- Assistant referees:
  - Tony Mason
  - Billy Smallwood
- Fourth official: Kevin Wright

MATCH RULES

- 90 minutes.
- Penalty shoot-out if scores still level.
- Five named substitutes
- Maximum of 3 substitutions.
