= Evan Horwood =

English footballer (born 1986)

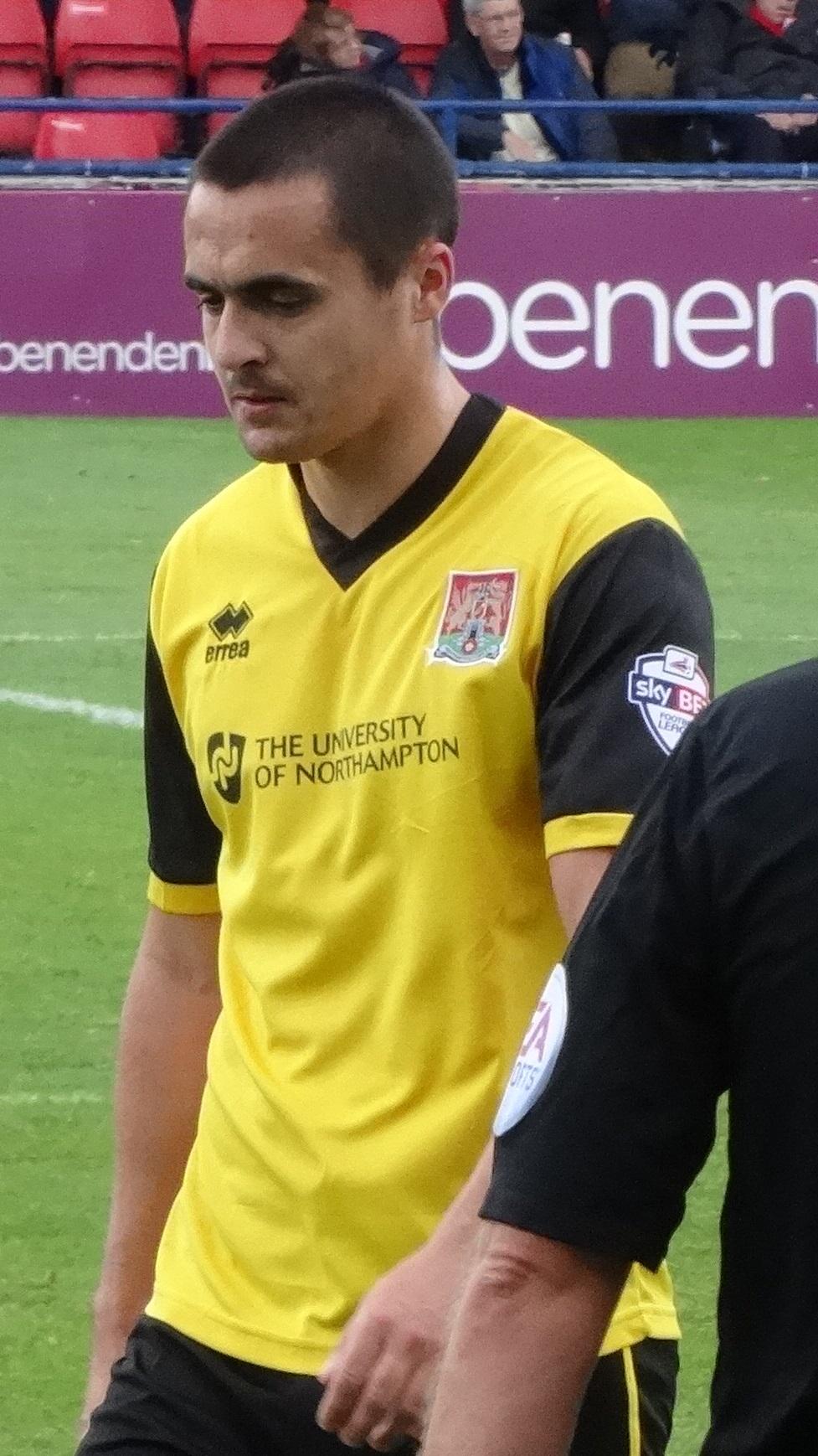
- Horwood playing for Northampton Town in 2014

Personal information
- Full name: Evan David Horwood
- Date of birth: 10 March 1986 (age 40)
- Place of birth: Billingham, England
- Height: 6 ft 0 in (1.83 m)
- Position: Defender

Team information
- Current team: Consett

Youth career
- 2002–2004: Sheffield United

Senior career*
Years	Team	Apps	(Gls)
2004–2008	Sheffield United	0	(0)
2005	→ Stockport County (loan)	10	(0)
2005	→ Scunthorpe United (loan)	0	(0)
2005–2006	→ York City (loan)	4	(0)
2006	→ Chester City (loan)	1	(0)
2006	→ Darlington (loan)	2	(0)
2007	→ Darlington (loan)	18	(0)
2007–2008	→ Gretna (loan)	15	(1)
2008–2010	Carlisle United	77	(0)
2010–2013	Hartlepool United	123	(5)
2013–2014	Tranmere Rovers	18	(0)
2014	→ Northampton Town (loan)	8	(0)
2014–2016	Northampton Town	25	(0)
2016	→ Grimsby Town (loan)	11	(0)
2016–2017	Chester	21	(1)
2017–2019	Bala Town	54	(3)
2020	Whitby Town	10	(0)
2020–2021	West Auckland Town		
2022	Consett	5	(0)
- * Club domestic league appearances and goals as of 00:25, 20 December 2022 (UTC)

Evan David Horwood (born 10 March 1986) is an English professional footballer who played as a defender for Northern Premier League Division One East side Consett.

Coming through the youth academy at Sheffield United, he played professionally for Stockport County, Scunthorpe United, York City, Chester City, Darlington, Gretna, Carlisle United, Hartlepool United, Tranmere Rovers, Northampton Town and Grimsby Town. He wound his final years in the sport playing in the Cymru Premier for Bala Town and for non-league sides Whitby Town and West Auckland Town.

== Early life ==
Born in Billingham, England, Horwood previously played for junior side St Francis before being scouted by the Hartlepool United and then Sunderland's academies. Horwood started his career with the Sheffield United youth system in July 2002, signing a three–year contract as a full-time scholar.

== Career ==
=== Sheffield United ===
After progressing the ranks of Sheffield United Academy and Reserves, Horwood joined Stockport County on a one-month loan on 10 March 2005. He then made his Stockport County debut two days later, on 12 March 2005, in a 2–1 loss against Colchester United. His loan spell at Stockport County was extended until the end of the 2004–05 season in April, making 10 appearances in League One.

After Stockport County's unsuccessful attempt to re–sign Horwood, he joined Scunthorpe United of League One on loan in August 2005. but made no appearances for the club as he only made the substitutes' bench for the opening game of the 2005–06 season against Brentford on 6 August. He made his debut for Sheffield United on 25 October 2005, coming on as a substitute in a League Cup third round tie at Reading.

Horwood joined Conference National club York City on a one-month loan in November 2005, making his debut in a 2–0 defeat against Morecambe on 26 November. He was recalled by United in January, making five appearances for York during this loan. He joined League Two team Chester City on loan later that month, making his debut in a 5–0 defeat against Carlisle United on 4 February 2006, before returning to Sheffield United in February.

Horwood joined Darlington on a one-month loan in October 2006. He made his Darlington debut shortly after on 14 October 2006, in a 1–1 draw against Hereford United. However, Horwood returned to United due to an injury sustained against Barnet later that month. He re-joined the club on loan in January 2007. However, he was sent off in a 1–1 draw with Bury following a lunge at Marc Pugh, which Darlington had a rejected appeal over, meaning he had to serve a three-match ban. After serving a three-match ban, Horwood then set a goal for Neil Wainwright in a 2–0 win over Boston United on 10 February 2007. In the last game of the season against Stockport County, he was sent–off in the first half, in a 5–0 loss. His loan at Darlington was later extended until the end of the 2006–07 season and have established himself in the first team, in which he finished with 21 appearances.

On 31 August 2007, Horwood joined Scottish Premier League side Gretna on loan until January 2008, making his debut in a 2–1 defeat against Kilmarnock on 15 September 2007. He scored his first goal for Gretna in the reverse fixture, scoring their third goal in a 3–3 draw with a curling shot from a Kenny Deuchar cross. He returned to United in January after making 17 appearances and scoring two goals for Gretna.

=== Carlisle United ===
He joined League One side Carlisle United on a free transfer later that month, where he signed a two-and-a-half-year contract.

Horwood made his Carlisle United debut on 2 February 2008, where he started the whole game, in a 2–1 win over Walsall. Since making his Carlisle United debut, Horwood established himself in the first team for the rest of the season. He also helped the side reach the play–offs, but was unsuccessful after losing to Leeds United 4–3 on aggregate. At the end of the 2007–08 season, Horwood had made 22 appearances in all competitions. Reflecting on his performance, Manager John Ward said: "Young Evan Horwood has come in and done a great job."

Although he suffered a concussion in the pre–season tour and subsequently recovered, Horwood started the 2008–09 season as he continued to be in the first team regular at Carlisle United. Halfway through the season, Horwood began competing with Darren Campion and Michael Liddle over a left–back position. He then regained his first team place in late–January in the absence of Liddle's international commitment. After suffering a knee injury in February, his return was short–lived when he briefly suffered a neck injury. Despite this, he had a handful of first team appearances until his sending off for second bookable offence, in a 1–1 draw against Cheltenham Town on 25 April 2009. At the 2008–09 season, Horwood made the total of 28 appearances.

In the 2009–10 season, Horwood started out on the substitute bench at the start of the season, as Ian Harte was preferred in the left–back position. But he regained his first team place in the left–back position when Harte began playing in the central defence position. His first appearance of the season came on 10 October 2009, where he started and played 82 minutes before being substituted, in a 1–0 loss against Norwich City. After suffering a bruised foot in February 2010, Horwood regained his first team place for the rest of the season since he recovered from a foot injury. He then played a vital role during a 2–2 draw against Southend United when he set up two goals on 20 March 2010. A week later, Horwood started in the left–back position for the Football League Trophy Final, in a 4–1 loss against Southampton. Despite the loss, Horwood then set up a goal for Jason Price, in a 3–1 win over Bristol Rovers on 2 April 2010. At the end of the 2009–10 season, Horwood went on to make the total of 39 appearances.

Although he was keen on signing a new contract, Horwood, however, was released by the club at the end of the 2009–10 season. The club's decision to not renewed his contract divided fans, as they believed he was "one of the best left backs in the division." Horwood, himself, said Manager Greg Abbott overlooked him with Liddle preferred instead in the 2008–09 season and that Abbott doesn't like him as a player.

Following this, he was linked with a move to the French side US Boulogne.

=== Hartlepool United ===
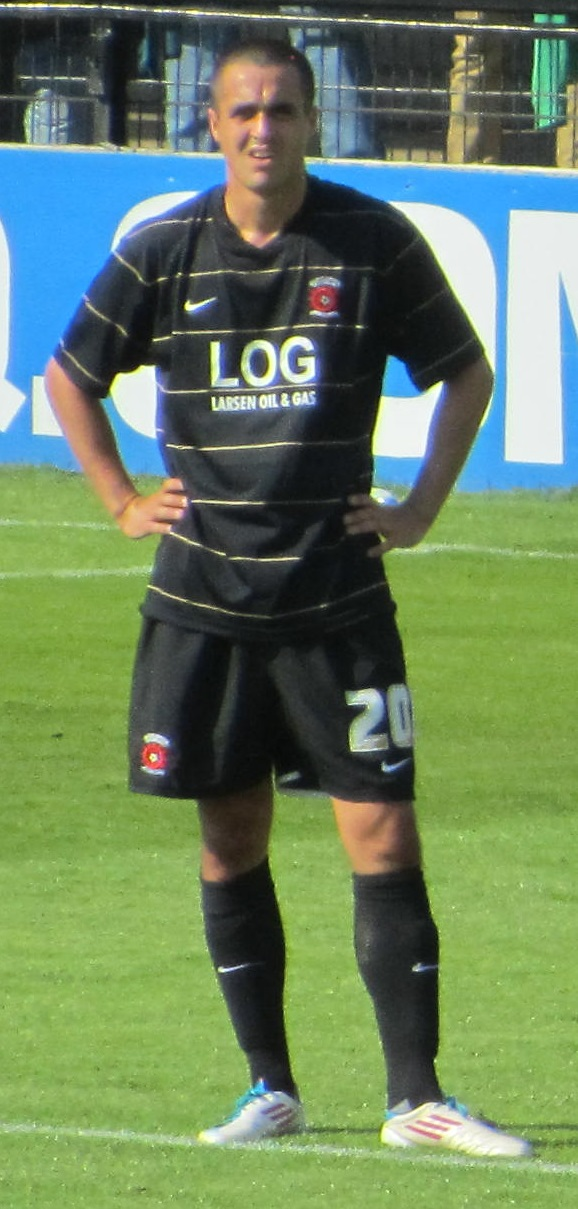
Horwood playing for Hartlepool United in 2011.

After training with Aberdeen, Horwood had a successful trial with League One club Hartlepool United, signing for them on 30 July 2010. Upon joining the club, Horwood was considered by local newspaper Hartlepool Mail as the club's first genuine left-back since Hugh Robertson.

Horwood made his debut in the club's opening match of 2010–11, a 0–0 draw against Rochdale. It wasn't until on 31 August 2010 when he scored his first goal for the club, in a 4–0 win over Northampton Town in the first round of the EFL Trophy. Since making his debut, he became the club's first team regular for Hartlepool United and was an ever-present player to the team until he suffered a groin injury in October 2010. After returning to the first team from injury, Horwood scored his first league goal in a follow-up match against Colchester United, in which Hartlepool United lose 3–2. Then in a second match against Colchester United of the season on 5 February 2011, he played a vital role in a 1–0 win when he set up a goal for Antony Sweeney to score the only goal in the game. Ten days later on 15 February 2011, he set up two goals in a 2–1 win over Charlton Athletic. He then scored again for the third time this season, in a 1–1 draw against Swindon Town on 2 April 2011. Having become a first team regular at his first season at Hartlepool United, Horwood went on to make a total of 54 appearances and scoring 3 times in all competitions.

At the start of the 2011–12, Horwood started the season well by setting up a goal for Adam Boyd, in a 2–2 draw against MK Dons in the opening game of the season. Two weeks later, on 20 August 2011, he set up a goal once again for Peter Hartley, in a 2–2 draw against Stevenage. However, at the beginning of September, he suffered thigh injury that kept him out for two weeks. He then scored on his return from injury, just coming on as a second-half substitute, in a 2–1 win over AFC Bournemouth on 24 September 2011. Since returning to the first team from injury, Horwood managed to regain his first team place throughout the season. Despite being sidelined on two occasions towards the end of the season, Horwood went on to make a total of 44 appearances and scoring once in all competitions.

In the 2012–13 season, Horwood continued to do well side for the side when he assisted a goal for Jonathan Franks in a 2–0 win over Scunthorpe United to give them their first league win of the season. At some point around the start of the season, Horwood made his 100th appearance in the opening game of the season against Swindon Town in a 0–0 draw. He then scored his first goal for the club on 6 October 2012, in a 2–1 loss against Crewe Alexandra. Three days later, on 9 October 2012, however, Horwood missed the penalty in the shoot–out, in a 3–2 loss against Bradford City in the second of the EFL Trophy. After facing setback from new competitions that saw him on the substitute bench, Horwood scored again on 24 November 2012, in a 1–1 draw against Walsall. A month later, on 29 December 2012 against Sheffield United, he played a vital role when he set up two goals, in a 3–2 win. Despite being injured later in the season, Horwood's performance have improved, resulting him having a handful of first team appearances. At the end of the 2012–13 season, he went on to make a total of 40 appearances and scoring two times.

Horwood was released by Hartlepool in May 2013. Upon learning his release, he revealed that he never wanted to leave the club.

=== Tranmere Rovers ===
Horwood signed for League One club Tranmere Rovers ahead of the 2013–14 season on 19 June 2013, joining on a two-year contract. Upon signing for the club, he was expected to face competition with Danny Holmes.

Horwood made his Tranmere Rovers debut in the opening game, where he started the whole game, in a 3–1 loss against Walsall. It wasn't until on 1 September 2013 when he scored his first goal for Tranmere Rovers, in a 2–1 loss against Fleetwood Town in the first round of the League Cup. Since making his debut for the club, he started in every match until he suffered a groin injury in late–September. Even after his return, Horwood struggled to compete against Holmes over the left–back position, although he played in the first team at times. As a result, he made 18 appearances for the side.

At the end of the 2013–14 season, Horwood was released by the club despite having one year left to his contract.

=== Northampton Town ===
On 24 March 2014, Horwood joined League Two side Northampton Town on loan for the rest of the 2013–14 season.

Horwood made his Northampton Town debut, where he came on as a second-half substitute, in a 2–2 draw against AFC Wimbledon on 25 March 2014. For the rest of the season, he began playing in a midfield role than his original role. In the last game of the season against Oxford United, Horwood set up a goal for Ivan Toney to help the side avoid relegation to the Conference Premier, in a 3–1 win. He went on to make 8 appearances for the side.

He signed for Northampton permanently on a two-year contract on 2 July 2014, shortly after being released by Tranmere. Horwood's first game after signing for the club on a permanent basis came in the opening game of the season with a 1–0 win over Mansfield Town, having played 11 minutes after coming on as a substitute. However, he suffered tendonitis that saw him out for three months. He previously suffered Achilles injury that saw him sidelined in the pre–season. It wasn't until around late–November when he made his return to training. The following month, on 20 December 2015, Horwood made his return to the first team, where he won a penalty, leading Marc Richards to convert a successful penalty, in a 2–1 win over Carlisle United. After his return, he managed to regain his first team place, playing in the left–back, though he appears in an attacking role. However, he suffered a groin injury and it kept him out throughout March. After returning to the first team in early–April, Horwood regained his first team place for the rest of the season. At the end of the season, he went on to make a total of 26 appearances in all competitions.

However at the start of the 2015–16 season, Horwood suffered injuries on two occasions that saw him have an operation on his groin. However, after returning from injury, he remained out of the first team, due to a good form from David Buchanan. At the end of the 2015–16 season, making no appearances, he was released by the club.

=== Grimsby Town (loan) ===
On 1 February 2016, Horwood joined National League team Grimsby Town on loan until the end of the season.

Horwood made his Grimsby Town debut eight days later on 9 February 2016, starting the whole game, in a 2–1 win over Bromley. Several weeks later, on 23 February 2016, he set up a goal for Pádraig Amond, who went on to score twice, in a 3–1 win over Woking. After sidelined for three matches over injury in April, Horwood returned to the first team, where he won a penalty to allow Omar Bogle successfully convert a penalty, in a 1–1 draw against Dover Athletic on 12 April 2016.

However, Horwood was not included in the matchday squad as Grimsby beat Forest Green Rovers 3–1 in the 2016 National League play-off final at Wembley Stadium, seeing Grimsby promoted into League Two after a six-year absence from the Football League. After making the total of 12 appearances, Horwood was not retained when his loan expired at the end of the season.

=== Chester ===
On 6 July 2016, Horwood joined National League club Chester on a one-year contract.

Horwood made his Chester debut, where he started the whole game, in a 3–0 win over Dagenham & Redbridge. Local newspaper Chester Chronicle praised Horwood's performance. He started in every match since the start of the season until he was sidelined for suspension and then injury. Upon returning to the first team, Horwood, however, lost his first team place to Johnny Hunt, who produced good form. It wasn't until on 17 December 2016 when he made his return for the side, in a 2–0 win over Aldershot Town. Although he played in different position, Horwood played in the left–back position in Hunt's absent. He then scored his first goal for the club on 25 February 2017, in a 1–0 win over Southport. After injuring his knee injury during a 1–0 win over Torquay United, it was announced that he would be out for the rest of the season. Despite this, the club would eventually avoid relegations towards the end of the season and finished his first season, making 21 appearances and scoring once in all competitions.

He switched his shirt number from 3 to 16 ahead of the 2017–18 season. In the pre–season, he suffered a knocks during the match. Although he signed a contract in May 2017, his contract was terminated two months later on 16 July 2017, in order to move to Bala Town.

=== Bala Town ===
Shortly after leaving Chester, Horwood joined Welsh Premier League side Bala Town.

Horwood made his debut for the club on 11 August 2017, scoring in a 3–0 victory over Newtown. He started in every match since making his debut until he suffered a calf injury in mid–October.

In December 2019, Horwood left Bala Town to relocate back to North East England.

=== Whitby Town ===
In January 2020, Horwood signed for Whitby Town.

=== West Auckland Town ===
In May 2020, Horwood signed for local Northern League Division One club West Auckland Town.

=== Consett ===
In October 2022, Horwood signed for Northern Premier League Division One East side Consett.

== Personal life ==
Born in Billingham, County Durham, Horwood supported Hartlepool United as a child.

Horwood's family comes from a football background. His brother, Gareth, also a footballer, having played for the Hartlepool United academy; his father, Taffy, is a former manager of Seaton Carew FC; Horwood attended both St Aidan and Brierton School and lived in Seaton Carew before moving to Sheffield United. In 2016, he became a father. While at Chester, Horwood changed his allegiance to supporting Chester and worked with the University of Chester's football teams and coached the first team to an unbeaten season in 2016/2017 as part of the Blues' community programme.

Whilst still playing for Bala Town, Horwood started an apprenticeship in electrical installation.

== Career statistics ==
As of match played 29 April 2017

Appearances and goals by club, season and competition
Club	Season	League			National Cup		League Cup		Other		Total	
Club	Season	Division	Apps	Goals	Apps	Goals	Apps	Goals	Apps	Goals	Apps	Goals
Sheffield United	2004–05	Championship	0	0	0	0	0	0	—		0	0
Sheffield United	2005–06	Championship	0	0	—		1	0	—		1	0
Sheffield United	Total		0	0	0	0	1	0	—		1	0
Stockport County (loan)	2004–05	League One	10	0	—		—		—		10	0
Scunthorpe United (loan)	2005–06	League One	0	0	—		—		—		0	0
York City (loan)	2005–06	Conference National	4	0	—		—		1 (Note: Appearance(s) in FA Trophy)	0	5	0
Chester City (loan)	2005–06	League Two	1	0	—		—		—		1	0
Darlington (loan)	2006–07	League Two	20	0	—		—		1 (Note: Appearance(s) in Football League Trophy)	0	21	0
Gretna (loan)	2007–08	Scottish Premier League	15	1	1	1	1	0	—		17	2
Carlisle United	2007–08	League One	21	0	—		—		—		21	0
Carlisle United	2008–09	League One	24	0	2	0	2	0	1	0	29	0
Carlisle United	2009–10	League One	32	0	4	0	0	0	7	0	43	0
Carlisle United	Total		77	0	6	0	2	0	8	0	93	0
Hartlepool United	2010–11	League One	45	2	4	0	2	0	3	1	54	3
Hartlepool United	2011–12	League One	41	1	1	0	1	0	1	0	44	1
Hartlepool United	2012–13	League One	37	2	1	0	1	0	1	0	40	2
Hartlepool United	Total		123	5	6	0	4	0	5	1	138	6
Tranmere Rovers	2013–14	League One	18	0	0	0	3	0	1	1	22	1
Northampton Town (loan)	2013–14	League Two	8	0	—		—		—		8	0
Northampton Town	2014–15	League Two	25	0	0	0	1	0	0	0	26	0
Northampton Town	2015–16	League Two	0	0	0	0	0	0	0	0	0	0
Northampton Town	Total		33	0	0	0	1	0	0	0	34	0
Grimsby Town (loan)	2015–16	National League	11	0	—		—		4 (Note: Three appearances FA Trophy, one in National League play-offs)	0	15	0
Chester	2016–17	National League	21	1	1	0	—		2	0	24	1
Career total			333	7	14	1	12	0	22	2	381	10

== Honours ==
Carlisle United

- Football League Trophy runner-up: 2009–10
