= Adam Collin =

English footballer (born 1984)

Personal information
- Full name: Adam James Collin
- Date of birth: 9 December 1984 (age 41)
- Place of birth: Penrith, England
- Height: 1.91 m (6 ft 3 in)
- Position: Goalkeeper

Youth career
- –2003: Newcastle United

Senior career*
Years	Team	Apps	(Gls)
2003–2004	Newcastle United	0	(0)
2003	→ Oldham Athletic (loan)	0	(0)
2004	→ Doncaster Rovers (loan)	0	(0)
2004	Doncaster Rovers	0	(0)
2004–2009	Workington	242	(1)
2009–2013	Carlisle United	154	(0)
2013–2016	Rotherham United	71	(0)
2016	→ Aberdeen (loan)	3	(0)
2016–2018	Notts County	73	(0)
2018–2020	Carlisle United	79	(0)
2020–2021	Kettering Town	14	(0)
2021	Basford United	20	(0)
2022–	Mansfield Town	0	(0)
Total		656	(0)
- * Club domestic league appearances and goals

Adam James Collin (born 9 December 1984) is an English former footballer who is goalkeeping coach at Mansfield Town.

== Career ==
=== Early career ===
Born in Penrith, Cumbria, Collin started his career as a professional footballer with Newcastle United as a youngster. He did not feature in the Newcastle first team, but was named as a substitute on a number of occasions. He then had spells on loan at Doncaster Rovers and Oldham Athletic before being released by Newcastle in the summer of 2004.

=== Workington ===
Workington assistant manager Tony Elliott, a former goalkeeper but at the time not attached to the club, recommended him to Workington manager Tommy Cassidy. Collin was added to the Reds squad just before the start of the 2004–05 season as cover for Neil Thompson. As Thompson was suspended for the first match of the new season, Collin made his debut in Reds 4–0 home win over Matlock Town. Collin kept clean sheets in each of his first four matches to establish himself as first choice goalkeeper.

He was sent off in 1–0 away defeat at Hyde United in April 2005, for handball outside the penalty area. His suspension was overturned after a video proved he was inside the area, he was the first Workington player to have a suspension quashed in such a manner. Collin saved three penalties in a shoot-out against Farsley Celtic on 17 May 2005, Workington won 6–5 to win promotion to the Conference North.

Collin made 41 starts during the 2005–06 season and a further 42 during the 2006–07 season.

=== Carlisle United ===
Collin started to train with Carlisle United twice a week in December 2008, and did enough to secure the offer of a permanent contract in February 2009, joining the club at the end of the 2008–09 season.

Collin made his debut for Carlisle United in the 2009–10 Football League Trophy Northern Section First Round, in the 2–2 draw with Morecambe on 1 September 2009. Carlisle won after a penalty shoot-out. He played again, in the Northern Section Second Round of the same tournament on 6 October, in Carlisle's 4–2 home victory over Macclesfield Town.

Collin then went on to be selected in Carlisle's first team on a regular basis, and saved the penalty that took the Cumbrians to Wembley for the final of the 2010 Football League Trophy.

Adam Collin's run of 146 consecutive starts ended when he was displaced in favour of Mark Gillespie in Carlisle's Football League Cup tie against Preston North End on 4 September 2012. He regained his place in the starting line-up in November 2012, missing 13 first team games in two months. Subsequently, Adam lost his starting place due to Carlisle's policy of goalkeeper rotation and was released in May 2013.

=== Rotherham United ===
On 23 May 2013, Collin agreed to sign for fellow League One side Rotherham United, in preference to pursuing interest from Scottish Premier League and English Championship clubs.

On 25 May 2014, Collin gained promotion to the EFL Championship with Rotherham United, after a heroic display in the Play-Off Final at Wembley. After trailing Leyton Orient by two goals to nil, Rotherham United fought back to level, before Collin saved two penalties – to maintain his 100% record over seven penalty shoot-outs, saving at least two penalties during each shoot-out.

Collin has been ever present in the starting line up at Rotherham United since taking over as preferred goalkeeper from Scott Shearer.

Throughout the start of the 2014–15 season, Collin was a pivotal member of the Rotherham side that maintained unlikely survival in the Championship, despite a late 3 point deduction, and a sizeable gulf in the budgets available at Rotherham and their fellow competitors. Collin was the main starter for Steve Evans as he picked him over Scott Loach and loan signing Emiliano Martinez of Arsenal and despite some dip in form towards the latter stages of the season, being replaced by Martinez in particular, played 36 times in the league and once in the FA Cup and was even named in an article in The Guardian as one of the Football League Championship's six most influential players.

At the start of the 2015–16 season, Collin was relegated to second choice keeper, with first Kelle Roos and later Lee Camp being chosen ahead of him. He made just two first team appearances, and on 15 January 2016, he was allowed to join Aberdeen on loan for the remainder of the season. He played three times for Aberdeen before returning to Rotherham.

=== Notts County ===
On 15 June 2016, Collin signed for Notts County. He was released by Notts County at the end of the 2017–18 season.

=== Carlisle United return ===
On 4 July 2018, Collin returned to former side Carlisle United on an initial 12-month deal reuniting him with former Notts County manager John Sheridan. He returned to the team on 25 August 2018 following a long-term injury to first-choice goalkeeper Joe Fryer, he went on to make 42 appearances and claim the Carlisle player of the season award as the club narrowly missed out on the League Two play-offs. Collin signed a further 12-month deal with the club on 10 May 2019, seeing him stay with the Cumbrian outfit until 30 June 2020. On 15 May 2020 Carlisle announced that Collin would depart the club for a second time following the expiry of his contract having made 249 appearances across two spells with the club.

=== Kettering Town ===
On 25 July 2020, Collin signed for National League North club Kettering Town.

=== Basford United ===
On 28 May 2021, Collin signed a 12-month deal with Northern Premier League Premier Division side Basford United. On 19 December 2021, Collin announced his retirement from football.

=== Coaching career ===
In November 2022, Collin was appointed Head of 1st Team & Academy Goalkeeping at Mansfield Town. He combined this position alongside a playing role as third-choice goalkeeper, behind regulars Christy Pym and Scott Flinders.

== Career statistics ==
As of match played 2 December 2019

Appearances and goals by club, season and competition
Club	Season	League			FA Cup		League Cup		Other		Total	
Club	Season	Division	Apps	Goals	Apps	Goals	Apps	Goals	Apps	Goals	Apps	Goals
Carlisle United	2009–10	League One	29	0	2	0	0	0	5 (Note: Appearances in Football League Trophy)	0	36	0
Carlisle United	2010–11	League One	46	0	3	0	1	0	6	0	56	0
Carlisle United	2011–12	League One	46	0	2	0	2	0	1	0	51	0
Carlisle United	2012–13	League One	12	0	2	0	2	0	0	0	16	0
Carlisle United	Total		133	0	9	0	5	0	12	0	159	0
Rotherham United	2013–14	League One	34	0	2	0	0	0	6 (Note: Three appearances in Football League Trophy and three appearances in League One play-offs)	0	42	0
Rotherham United	2014–15	Championship	36	0	1	0	0	0	0	0	37	0
Rotherham United	2015–16	Championship	1	0	0	0	1	0	0	0	2	0
Rotherham United	Total		71	0	3	0	1	0	6	0	81	0
Aberdeen (loan)	2015–16	Scottish Premiership	3	0	0	0	0	0	0	0	3	0
Notts County	2016–17	League Two	43	0	3	0	1	0	0	0	47	0
Notts County	2017–18	League Two	30	0	2	0	0	0	2 (Note: Two appearances in League Two play-offs)	0	34	0
Notts County	Total		73	0	5	0	1	0	2	0	81	0
Carlisle United	2018–19	League Two	42	0	2	0	0	0	3 (Note: Appearances in EFL Trophy)	0	47	0
Carlisle United	2019–20	League Two	19	0	2	0	2	0	0	0	23	0
Carlisle United	Total		61	0	4	0	2	0	3	0	70	0
Career total			341	0	21	0	9	0	23	0	394	0

== Honours ==
Carlisle United

- Football League Trophy: 2010–11; runner-up: 2009–10

Rotherham United

- Football League One play-offs: 2014
