= 2009–10 Carlisle United F.C. season =

Carlisle United F.C.
2009–10 season
- Chairman: Andrew Jenkins
- Manager: Greg Abbott
- Stadium: Brunton Park
- League One: 14th
- FA Cup: Third round
- League Cup: Third round
- Football League Trophy: Runners-up
- Top goalscorer: Ian Harte (16)

For the 2009–10 season, Carlisle United F.C. competed in Football League One.

== First team squad ==
Players ages are as of 1 August 2009

No.	Name	Nat.	Place of birth	Date of birth (Age)	Signed from	Note
Goalkeepers
1	Adam Collin	(England)	Penrith	9 December 1984 (aged 24)	Workington	
39	Mark Gillespie	(England)	Newcastle upon Tyne	27 March 1992 (aged 17)	Newcastle United	
40	Lenny Pidgeley	(England)	Twickenham	7 February 1984 (aged 25)	Millwall	
Defenders
2	David Raven	(England)	Birkenhead	10 March 1985 (aged 24)	Liverpool	
3	Evan Horwood	(England)	Billingham	10 March 1986 (aged 23)	Sheffield United	
5	Danny Livesey	(England)	Salford	31 December 1984 (aged 24)	Bolton Wanderers	
6	Peter Murphy	(Republic of Ireland)	Dublin	27 October 1980 (aged 28)	Blackburn Rovers	
13	Simon Lakeland	(England)	Preston	13 August 1991 (aged 17)	–	
14	Ian Harte	(Republic of Ireland)	Drogheda	31 August 1977 (aged 31)	Blackpool	
16	Joshua Gowling	(England)	Coventry	29 November 1983 (aged 25)	AFC Bournemouth	signed for Gillingham in August 2009
19	Tom Aldred	(Scotland)	(England) Bolton	11 September 1990 (aged 18)	–	
21	Richard Keogh	(Republic of Ireland)	(England) Harlow	11 August 1986 (aged 22)	Bristol City	
23	Tony Kane	(Northern Ireland)	Belfast	29 August 1987 (aged 21)	Blackburn Rovers	
29	Steven Swinglehurst	(England)	Carlisle	23 October 1992 (aged 16)	–	
Midfielders
4	Marc Bridge-Wilkinson	(England)	Nuneaton	16 March 1979 (aged 30)	Bradford City	
7	Joe Anyinsah	(England)	Bristol	8 October 1984 (aged 24)	Preston North End	
8	Graham Kavanagh	(Republic of Ireland)	Dublin	2 December 1973 (aged 35)	Sunderland	
10	Matty Robson	(England)	Coxhoe	23 January 1985 (aged 24)	Hartlepool United	
11	Paul Thirlwell	(England)	Washington	13 February 1979 (aged 30)	Derby County	
12	Tom Taiwo	(England)	Pudsey	27 February 1990 (aged 19)	Chelsea	
15	Gavin Rothery	(England)	Morley	22 September 1987 (aged 21)	Harrogate Town	
16	Ben Marshall	(England)	Salford	29 March 1991 (aged 18)	on loan from Stoke City	
17	Cleveland Taylor	(Jamaica)	(England) Leicester	9 September 1983 (aged 25)	Scunthorpe United	signed for Brentford in August 2009
18	Conor Tinnion	(England)	Whitehaven	4 March 1991 (aged 18)	–	released in April 2010
20	Jonny Blake	(England)	Lancaster	4 February 1991 (aged 18)	–	released in April 2010
22	Michael Burns	(England)	Huyton	4 October 1988 (aged 20)	Bolton Wanderers	
24	Kevan Hurst	(England)	Chesterfield	27 August 1985 (aged 23)	Scunthorpe United	
Forwards
9	Scott Dobie	(Scotland)	(England) Workington	10 October 1978 (aged 30)	Nottingham Forest	
16	Vincent Péricard	(France)	(Cameroon) Obala	3 October 1982 (aged 26)	Stoke City	signed for Swindon Town in January 2010
17	Richard Offiong	(England)	South Shields	17 December 1983 (aged 25)	Hamilton Academical	
25	Adam Clayton	(England)	Manchester	14 January 1989 (aged 20)	on loan from Manchester City	
26	Andy Cook	(England)	Bishop Auckland	18 October 1990 (aged 18)	–	
27	Darryl Duffy	(Scotland)	Glasgow	16 April 1984 (aged 25)	on loan from Bristol Rovers	
28	Gary Madine	(England)	Gateshead	24 August 1990 (aged 18)	–	
30	Ryan Bowman	(England)	Carlisle	30 November 1991 (aged 17)	–	
31	Jason Price	(Wales)	Aberdare	12 April 1977 (aged 32)	on loan from Millwall	

== Competitions ==
=== League One ===
==== League table ====
Pos	Team	Pld	W	D	L	GF	GA	GD	Pts
12	Milton Keynes Dons	46	17	9	20	60	68	−8	60
13	Brighton & Hove Albion	46	15	14	17	56	60	−4	59
14	Carlisle United	46	15	13	18	63	66	−3	58
15	Yeovil Town	46	13	14	19	55	59	−4	53
16	Oldham Athletic	46	13	13	20	39	57	−18	52

Source: The Football League
Rules for classification: 1) points; 2) goal difference; 3) number of goals scored.

==== Results ====
8 August 2009	Carlisle United	1–3	Brentford	Carlisle
15:00				Stadium: Brunton Park; Attendance: 5,913

15 August 2009	Millwall	0–0	Carlisle United	Bermondsey, London
15:00				Stadium: The New Den; Attendance: 7,782

18 August 2009	Stockport County	1–2	Carlisle United	Stockport
19:45				Stadium: Edgeley Park

22 August 2009	Carlisle United	0–1	Exeter City	Carlisle
15:00				Stadium: Brunton Park

29 August 2009	Leyton Orient	2–2	Carlisle United	Leyton, London
15:00				Stadium: Brisbane Road

5 September 2009	Carlisle United	3–0	Tranmere Rovers	Carlisle
15:00				Stadium: Brunton Park

12 September 2009	Carlisle United	0–2	Brighton & Hove Albion	Carlisle
15:00				Stadium: Brunton Park

19 September 2009	Oldham Athletic	2–0	Carlisle United	Oldham
15:00				Stadium: Boundary Park

26 September 2009	Carlisle United	1–1	Southampton	Carlisle
15:00				Stadium: Brunton Park

29 September 2009	Leeds United	1–1	Carlisle United	Leeds
19:45				Stadium: Elland Road

3 October 2009	Walsall	2–2	Carlisle United	Walsall
15:00				Stadium: Bescot Stadium

10 October 2009	Carlisle United	0–1	Norwich City	Carlisle
15:00				Stadium: Brunton Park

17 October 2009	Yeovil Town	3–1	Carlisle United	Yeovil
15:00				Stadium: Huish Park

24 October 2009	Carlisle United	2–1	Southend United	Carlisle
15:00				Stadium: Brunton Park

31 October 2009	Carlisle United	3–1	Charlton Athletic	Carlisle
15:00				Stadium: Brunton Park

14 November 2009	Bristol Rovers	3–2	Carlisle United	Bristol
15:00				Stadium: Memorial Stadium

21 November 2009	Carlisle United	0–1	Swindon Town	Carlisle
15:00				Stadium: Brunton Park

24 November 2009	Milton Keynes Dons	3–4	Carlisle United	Milton Keynes
19:45				Stadium: Stadium MK

1 December 2009	Carlisle United	3–2	Hartlepool United	Carlisle
19:45				Stadium: Brunton Park

5 December 2009	Gillingham	0–0	Carlisle United	Gillingham
15:00				Stadium: Priestfield Stadium

12 December 2009	Carlisle United	1–0	Wycombe Wanderers	Carlisle
15:00				Stadium: Brunton Park

28 December 2009	Tranmere Rovers	0–0	Carlisle United	Birkenhead
15:00				Stadium: Prenton Park

16 January 2010	Brentford	3–1	Carlisle United	Brentford, London
15:00				Stadium: Griffin Park

23 January 2010	Carlisle United	0–0	Stockport County	Carlisle
15:00				Stadium: Brunton Park

26 January 2010	Exeter City	2–3	Carlisle United	Exeter
19:45				Stadium: St James Park

30 January 2010	Carlisle United	2–2	Leyton Orient	Carlisle
15:00				Stadium: Brunton Park

2 February 2010	Colchester United	2–1	Carlisle United	Colchester
19:45	Platt 61'; Odejayi 90'	Report	24' Harte	Stadium: Colchester Community Stadium; Attendance: 3,903

6 February 2010	Huddersfield Town	1–1	Carlisle United	Huddersfield
15:00				Stadium: Kirklees Stadium

13 February 2010	Carlisle United	5–0	Milton Keynes Dons	Carlisle
15:00				Stadium: Brunton Park

16 February 2010	Carlisle United	1–2	Huddersfield Town	Carlisle
19:45				Stadium: Brunton Park

20 February 2010	Swindon Town	2–0	Carlisle United	Swindon
15:00				Stadium: County Ground

23 February 2010	Hartlepool United	4–1	Carlisle United	Hartlepool
19:45				Stadium: Victoria Park

27 February 2010	Carlisle United	2–0	Gillingham	Carlisle
15:00				Stadium: Brunton Park

6 March 2010	Wycombe Wanderers	0–0	Carlisle United	High Wycombe
15:00		Report		Stadium: Adams Park; Attendance: 4,876

9 March 2010	Carlisle United	1–3	Millwall	Carlisle
19:45				Stadium: Brunton Park

13 March 2010	Carlisle United	2–1	Colchester United	Carlisle
15:00				Stadium: Brunton Park

16 March 2010	Carlisle United	1–0	Yeovil Town	Carlisle
19:45				Stadium: Brunton Park

20 March 2010	Southend United	2–2	Carlisle United	Southend-on-Sea
15:00				Stadium: Roots Hall

2 April 2010	Carlisle United	3–1	Bristol Rovers	Carlisle
19:45				Stadium: Brunton Park

5 April 2010	Charlton Athletic	1–0	Carlisle United	Charlton, London
15:00				Stadium: The Valley

10 April 2010	Brighton & Hove Albion	1–2	Carlisle United	Brighton
15:00	Elphick 85'	Report	33' Harte; 88' Madine	Stadium: Withdean Stadium; Attendance: 6,673

13 April 2010	Carlisle United	1–3	Leeds United	Carlisle
19:45				Stadium: Brunton Park

17 April 2010	Carlisle United	1–2	Oldham Athletic	Carlisle
15:00				Stadium: Brunton Park

24 April 2010	Southampton	3–2	Carlisle United	Southampton
15:00				Stadium: St Mary's Stadium

1 May 2010	Carlisle United	1–1	Walsall	Carlisle
15:00				Stadium: Brunton Park

8 May 2010	Norwich City	0–2	Carlisle United	Norwich
15:00				Stadium: Carrow Road

=== FA Cup ===
7 November 2009 First round	Carlisle United	2–2	Morecambe	Carlisle
15:00				Stadium: Brunton Park; Attendance: 4,181

17 November 2009 First round replay	Morecambe	0–1	Carlisle United	Morecambe
19:45				Stadium: Christie Park; Attendance: 3,307

28 November 2009 Second round	Carlisle United	3–2	Norwich City	Carlisle
15:00				Stadium: Brunton Park; Attendance: 3,946

2 January 2010 Third round	Everton	3–1	Carlisle United	Liverpool
15:00				Stadium: Goodison Park; Attendance: 3,005

=== League Cup ===
11 August 2009 First round	Carlisle United	1–0	Oldham Athletic	Carlisle
19:45				Stadium: Brunton Park; Attendance: 2,509

26 August 2009 Second round	Bristol City	0–2	Carlisle United	Bristol
19:45				Stadium: Ashton Gate Stadium; Attendance: 6,359

22 September 2009 Third round	Carlisle United	1–3	Portsmouth	Carlisle
19:45				Stadium: Brunton Park; Attendance: 7,042

=== Football League Trophy ===
1 September 2009 First round	Morecambe	2–2 (2–4 p)	Carlisle United	Morecambe
19:45	Hunter 3'; Curtis 56'	Report	48', 90' Kavanagh	Stadium: Christie Park; Attendance: 2,016

6 October 2009 Second round	Carlisle United	4–2	Macclesfield Town	Carlisle
19:45				Stadium: Brunton Park; Attendance: 1,753

10 November 2009 Quarter-final	Chesterfield	1–3	Carlisle United	Chesterfield
19:45				Stadium: Saltergate; Attendance: 2,878

15 December 2009 Semi-final	Carlisle United	3–0	Bradford City	Carlisle
19:45				Stadium: Brunton Park; Attendance: 3,176

19 January 2010 Area final (first leg)	Leeds United	1–2	Carlisle United	Leeds
19:45				Stadium: Elland Road; Attendance: 13,011

9 February 2010 Area final (second leg)	Carlisle United	2–3 (6–5 p)	Leeds United	Carlisle
19:00				Stadium: Brunton Park; Attendance: 9,430

28 March 2010 Final	Southampton	4–1	Carlisle United	Wembley, London
13:30				Stadium: Wembley Stadium; Attendance: 73,476
