= Marc Bridge-Wilkinson =

English footballer (born 1979)

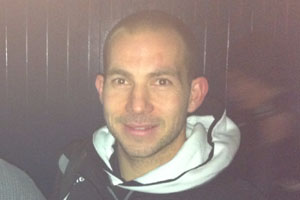

Personal information
- Full name: Marc Bridge-Wilkinson
- Date of birth: 16 March 1979 (age 47)
- Place of birth: Coventry, England
- Height: 1.73 m (5 ft 8 in)
- Position: Midfielder

Team information
- Current team: Huddersfield Town (assistant coach)

Youth career
- 1997–1998: Derby County

Senior career*
Years	Team	Apps	(Gls)
1998–2000	Derby County	1	(0)
1999	→ Carlisle United (loan)	7	(0)
2000–2004	Port Vale	124	(31)
2004–2005	Stockport County	22	(2)
2005	→ Bradford City (loan)	4	(0)
2005–2007	Bradford City	83	(12)
2007–2011	Carlisle United	90	(11)
2010–2011	→ Darlington (loan)	9	(3)
2011–2012	Darlington	46	(12)
Total		386	(71)
- * Club domestic league appearances and goals

Marc Bridge-Wilkinson (born 16 March 1979) is an English football coach and former playerwho is an assistant coach at EFL League One club Huddersfield Town.

A left-sided midfielder and also a winger, he was known for his goal-scoring ability. He started his career at Derby County in 1998 but instead made his name at Port Vale following his transfer to Vale Park in 2000. He made 140 appearances in four years, scoring 36 goals in all competitions and lifting the Football League Trophy in 2001. He spent the 2004–05 season with Stockport County before signing with Bradford City in 2005. He spent two years at Bradford, making 95 total appearances. He signed with Carlisle United in 2007 and went on to pick up a Football League Trophy runners-up medal with the club in 2010. After four years with Carlisle, he joined Darlington in 2011, breaking his run of ten consecutive seasons in the third tier of English football. With Darlington, he lifted the FA Trophy in 2011 before his contract was terminated in January 2012. He was re-signed to Darlington on a non-contract basis until the club folded in the summer of 2012.

He went on to coach at Huddersfield Town and Liverpool.

== Career ==
=== Derby County ===
Born in Coventry, Bridge-Wilkinson was a product of the Derby County youth academy. He made his debut for Derby in a 2–1 victory against Liverpool at Anfield on 7 November 1998. This Premier League clash would be his only appearance for the club. He joined Carlisle United of the Third Division, where he played seven games in a six-week loan spell at the end of the 1998–99 season. He returned to Derby and scored 11 goals for the reserves, who won the Premier Reserves League (South). He was released by the club at the end of the 1999–2000 season, after which he was given a trial at Port Vale, where chief scout Ray Williams said "he will be another little diamond Port Vale have unearthed".

=== Port Vale ===
Bridge-Wilkinson joined Port Vale on a free transfer following his trial and made his debut in a 4–1 defeat at Oldham Athletic on 12 August 2000. The following week he scored twice in his first Vale start when they defeated Oxford United 3–0. He scored 14 goals in 52 games throughout his first season at Vale, which included one in the final of the Football League Trophy final – which Vale won 2–1 over Brentford. He also scored the winner in the Potteries derby in the Northern Section semi-finals with a 105th minute golden-goal penalty.

He spent much of the next season out with a hamstring injury and did not feature between August and late January. His return to the side coincided with Vale's climb up the table, and he consequently signed a new two-year contract with the club. Recovering from a knee injury, his nine goals in 2002–03 were enough to make him the club's top-scorer, as the Second Division club posted a mid-table finish. He struck seven times in 37 games during the 2003–04 campaign, as the club finished outside of the play-offs on goal difference. At the end of the season manager Martin Foyle offered him a new contract at reduced pay due to the club's dire financial situation, an offer which Bridge-Wilkinson rejected to sign for League One rivals Stockport County on a two-year contract in June 2004.

=== Stockport County ===
Bridge-Wilkinson made just 22 starts with Stockport, and in February 2005, joined Bradford City, also of League One, on a month's loan deal to cover for injuries. The loan soon become a permanent transfer.

=== Bradford City ===
Bridge-Wilkinson made his City debut on 25 February 2005 in a 1–1 draw with Walsall and after four games he signed a two-year deal on transfer deadline day to stay at Valley Parade permanently. He celebrated his new contract with his first Bradford goal in a 1–1 draw with Doncaster Rovers later the same day. He scored another two goals in a 4–1 victory over Brentford, finishing the season with three goals from his 12 games.

At the start of the following season, he missed more than two months after sustaining a knee injury in training. He finished the season with six goals in forty games. On 16 September 2006, he scored against his former club Port Vale, but it was just one of four goals for Bridge-Wilkinson that season, as Bradford were relegated into League Two. He was one of many players released by Bradford in May 2007.

=== Carlisle United ===
In June 2007, Bridge-Wilkinson rejoined Carlisle United. He played 52 games in his first full season at the club, including both legs of the League One play-off semi-final with Leeds United. He scored Carlisle's second at Elland Road to give his side a 2–1 first leg victory. However, in the second leg he could not help his side avoid a 2–0 defeat.

A regular in 2008–09, he picked up a toe injury in January, which ended his contribution to the campaign. The problem was a floating bone in his big toe. He made 26 appearances in 2009–10, as Carlisle posted a mid-table finish. He also made an appearance at Wembley Stadium in the Football League Trophy final, which ended in a 4–1 defeat to Southampton.

=== Darlington ===
Searching for first-team football, in October 2010 he joined Conference National club Darlington on loan for one month. After the midfielder impressed manager Mark Cooper, this one month then got extended until January.

On 18 January 2011, he signed for Darlington on a permanent basis after he was released from Carlisle United two days earlier. He scored the first hat-trick of his career in a 6–1 victory against Eastbourne Borough on 12 February. All Bridge-Wilkinson's goals, which included two penalties, came in the first half and within the space of 14 minutes. At the end of the campaign he picked up the second significant honour of his career, as Darlington lifted the 2011 FA Trophy with a 1–0 victory over Mansfield Town at Wembley. Darlington suffered financial difficulties during Bridge-Wilkinson's time at the club and his contract was terminated on 16 January 2012, along with the rest of the playing squad and caretaker manager Craig Liddle; he stated that "to say I feel sick is an understatement". However, a surprise decision meant that the club would continue to complete their remaining fixtures, and Bridge-Wilkinson returned to Darlington on a non-contract basis. Darlington were relegated at the end of the 2011–12 season, having been deducted ten points for entering administration and as the club reformed to Darlington 1883 in the Northern Football League, Bridge-Wilkinson left the club and had a trial at League Two club Accrington Stanley.

== Style of play ==
Bridge-Wilkinson was a technical midfielder with an eye for goal. He had good composure, movement and possession skills.

"He's always got a chance of creating you something. He'll give balls away sometimes, but you have to put up with that because he's a clever player."

— Darlington manager Mark Cooper speaking on Bridge-Wilkinson in March 2011.

== Coaching career ==
Bridge-Wilkinson spent three years as a coach at the Academy at Huddersfield Town, before he was appointed under-14 coach at Liverpool's Academy in 2015. He was promoted to under-16 coach in July 2018 and then to under-18 coach in May 2020. He stepped down from his position at the end of the 2024–25 season, leaving Academy director Alex Inglethorpe to commend the "important legacy" he left behind. In June 2025, Bridge-Wilkinson returned to Huddersfield Town as an assistant coach to the newly-appointed Lee Grant.

== Career statistics ==
Appearances and goals by club, season and competition
Club	Season	League			FA Cup		League Cup		Other		Total	
Club	Season	Division	Apps	Goals	Apps	Goals	Apps	Goals	Apps	Goals	Apps	Goals
Derby County	1997–98	Premier League	0	0	0	0	0	0	—		0	0
Derby County	1998–99	Premier League	1	0	0	0	0	0	—		1	0
Derby County	1999–2000	Premier League	0	0	0	0	0	0	—		0	0
Derby County	Total		1	0	0	0	0	0	0	0	1	0
Carlisle United (loan)	1998–99	Third Division	7	0	—		—		—		7	0
Port Vale	2000–01	Second Division	42	9	2	1	1	1	7 (Note: Appearance(s) in the Football League Trophy.)	3	52	14
Port Vale	2001–02	Second Division	19	6	0	0	0	0	0	0	19	6
Port Vale	2002–03	Second Division	31	9	0	0	1	0	1	0	33	9
Port Vale	2003–04	Second Division	32	7	2	0	1	0	1	0	36	7
Port Vale	Total		124	31	4	1	3	1	9	3	140	36
Stockport County	2004–05	League One	22	2	2	0	1	0	0	0	25	2
Bradford City	2004–05	League One	12	3	—		—		—		12	3
Bradford City	2005–06	League One	36	5	2	0	1	1	1	0	40	6
Bradford City	2006–07	League One	39	4	3	1	1	0	0	0	43	5
Bradford City	Total		87	12	5	1	2	1	1	0	95	14
Carlisle United	2007–08	League One	45	6	2	0	1	0	4 (Note: 2 appearances in the Football League Trophy, 2 appearances in the play-offs.)	2	52	8
Carlisle United	2008–09	League One	23	5	3	0	2	0	0	0	28	5
Carlisle United	2009–10	League One	19	0	0	0	2	0	5	1	26	1
Carlisle United	2010–11	League One	3	0	0	0	1	0	0	0	4	0
Carlisle United	Total		90	11	5	0	6	0	9	3	110	14
Darlington	2010–11	Conference National	27	9	3	1	—		6 (Note: Appearance(s) in the FA Trophy.)	1	36	11
Darlington	2011–12	Conference National	28	6	0	0	—		1	0	29	6
Darlington	Total		55	15	3	1	0	0	7	1	65	17
Career total			386	71	19	3	12	2	26	7	443	83

== Honours ==
Port Vale

- Football League Trophy: 2000–01

Carlisle United

- Football League Trophy runner-up: 2009–10

Darlington

- FA Trophy: 2011
