= Tom Taiwo =

English footballer (born 1990)

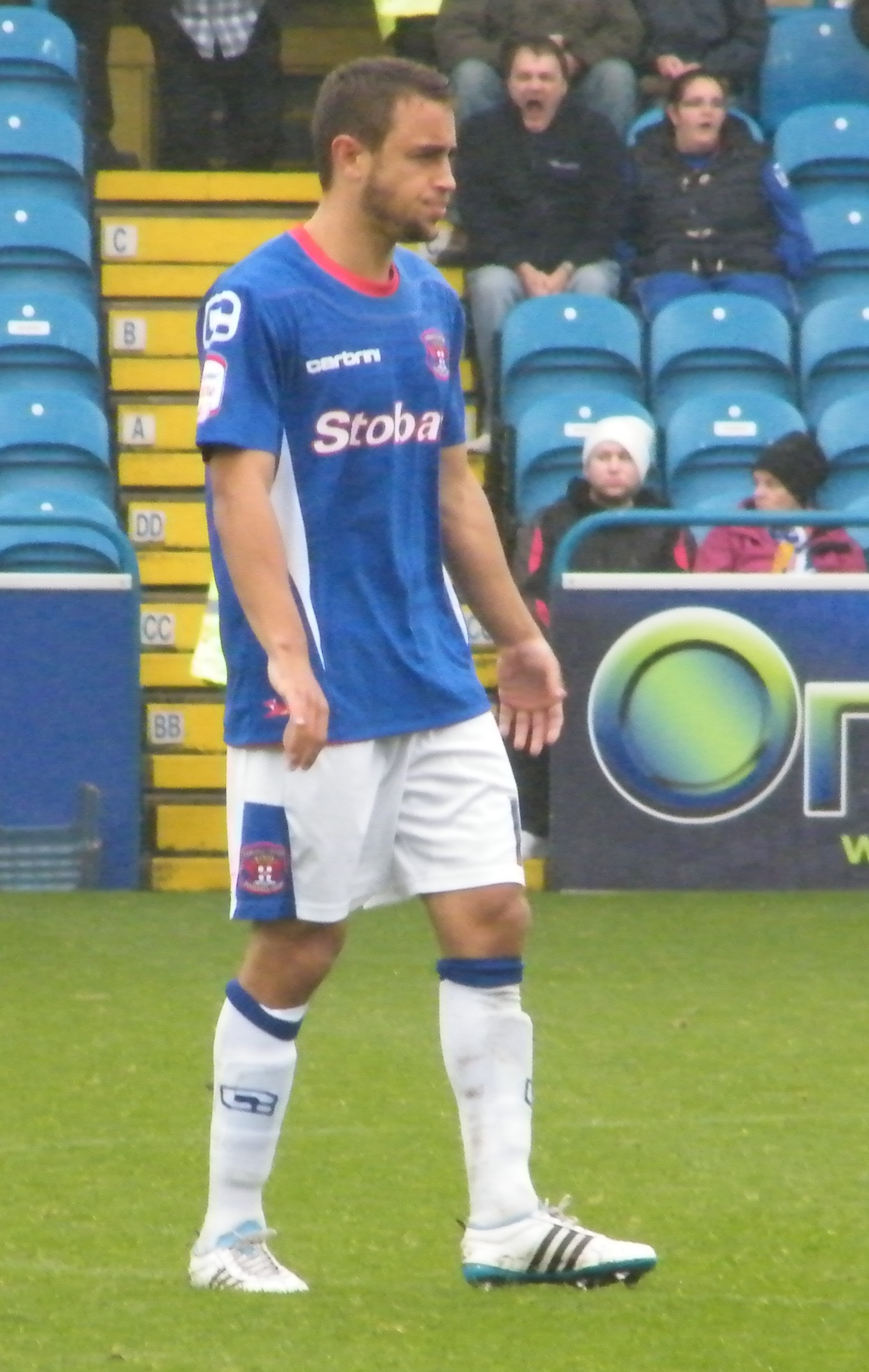
- Taiwo playing for Carlisle United in 2011

Personal information
- Full name: Thomas James William Taiwo
- Date of birth: 27 February 1990 (age 36)
- Place of birth: Pudsey, England
- Height: 1.70 m (5 ft 7 in)
- Position: Midfielder

Youth career
- 1997–2000: Farsley Celtic
- 2000–2006: Leeds United
- 2006–2008: Chelsea

Senior career*
Years	Team	Apps	(Gls)
2008–2010	Chelsea	0	(0)
2008	→ Port Vale (loan)	4	(0)
2009–2010	→ Carlisle United (loan)	19	(1)
2010–2012	Carlisle United	99	(5)
2012–2014	Hibernian	47	(2)
2014–2018	Falkirk	104	(3)
2018–2019	Hamilton Academical	16	(0)
Total		289	(11)

International career
2007	England U17	2	(0)
- * Club domestic league appearances and goals

Thomas James William Taiwo (born 27 February 1990) is an English former footballer who played as a midfielder.

An England under-17 international, he graduated out of the Chelsea academy to turn professional in 2008, having switched from the Leeds United Academy two years earlier. He never appeared for the first team and instead enjoyed a brief loan spell at Port Vale before he joined Carlisle United on a loan deal that was made permanent in January 2010. He played in two consecutive Football League Trophy finals for the club, as Carlisle were defeated in 2010, before they won the tournament in 2011.

He joined Scottish club Hibernian in September 2012 and stayed with the club for two seasons. He signed with Falkirk in July 2014 and played on the losing side in the 2015 Scottish Cup final. He joined Hamilton Academical in June 2018 and retired due to injury in June 2019.

== Club career ==
=== Chelsea ===
Taiwo was a student at St Mary's Catholic High School in Menston. He joined Chelsea from Leeds United along with Michael Woods in a controversial move after Ken Bates accused Chelsea of tapping up the youngsters. Leeds received £5 million in compensation for the pair after threatening to take Chelsea to court. He broke his leg two days before he was due to make his youth team debut for the "Blues". His parents were accused of taking backhanders to influence his decision; Taiwo stated that these "false claims" were highly "upsetting" to him.

Taiwo joined League Two club Port Vale on a month's loan in August 2008. He made his debut, coming on as a substitute in the 61st minute, at home to Bournemouth, in the 3–1 win on 30 August. Vale sent him back to Chelsea in September after they decided not to extend his loan. Taiwo went on a trial with Seattle Sounders FC of Major League Soccer in March 2009.

"I always felt like I was playing catch-up. The club had a glut of players in my position and I was unlucky enough to suffer a serious injury. There's always somebody younger than you coming through. I was disappointed, but I also have to look back and say I wasn't good enough. That can be quite a painful thing to say. As a young footballer, you can be quite blinded at times. It was the first time in my life I'd ever suffered a real setback. I had to face the fact that I wasn't as good as I hoped I'd be."

— In 2014, the BBC featured Taiwo as part of an article on notable players who had suffered rejection from Premier League sides.

=== Carlisle United ===
In July 2009, Carlisle United announced they had signed Taiwo on loan until the end of December. He impressed supporters with his "aggressive, tackle-heavy performances at the heart of the midfield." Taiwo scored his first goal for Carlisle in a 3–2 league victory over rivals Hartlepool United on 1 December. On 6 January 2010, Carlisle signed Taiwo from Chelsea permanently on a two-and-a-half-year contract, after paying the London club an undisclosed fee. He played a total of 35 League One games in 2009–10. He also featured in six of Carlisle's seven games in the 2009–10 League Trophy, including the final in front of 73,476 fans at Wembley, which ended in a 4–1 defeat to Southampton; he was a late substitute for captain Paul Thirlwell, with the "Blues" already 4–0 down.

He played five games of Carlisle's march to the League Trophy final in 2010–11; he also started the final against Brentford, which the "Cumbrians" won 1–0. In total he made 55 appearances in league and cup for Greg Abbott's side, scoring three goals. He scored three times in 41 games in 2011–12, as Carlisle finished eighth, missing out on the play-offs by a four-point margin. On 11 June 2012, Taiwo revealed he would not be signing a new contract with Carlisle, citing family reasons for his departure from Brunton Park. However, Carlisle retained his registration and initially demanded a £200,000 transfer fee from other clubs – a prospect that ended a potential move to Yorkshire club Bradford City.

=== Hibernian ===
In September 2012, Taiwo signed a two-year contract with Scottish Premier League club Hibernian. "Hibs" manager Pat Fenlon said that he felt Taiwo was a quality signing, and would provide competition for central midfielders Jorge Claros and Gary Deegan. Speaking about his move, Taiwo stated his belief that the club could challenge for the league title. Carlisle manager Greg Abbott criticised Taiwo's move to Scotland, claiming it was a poor decision and that he had been badly advised. Taiwo made his "Hibs" debut on 6 October, in a 3–0 win over Dundee at Easter Road.

Early in the January 2014 window, BBC Sport reported that new manager Terry Butcher had made Taiwo available for transfer. Butcher refused to confirm the report, but said that allowing some players to leave would freshen the squad and that he was also looking to recruit some new players. Taiwo was released by Hibernian at the end of the 2013–14 season.

=== Falkirk ===
Taiwo joined Scottish Championship side Falkirk in July 2014 after manager Peter Houston sought to add experience to his midfield. He scored three goals in 41 appearances for the "Bairns" in the 2014–15 season, including one at Ibrox Stadium that effectively ended Rangers's chances of beating his former club Hibernian into second place. Falkirk also reached the 2015 Scottish Cup final, where they lost 2–1 to Inverness Caledonian Thistle at Hampden Park.

He played 27 games in the 2015–16 season as Falkirk posted a second-place finish before they lost 4–1 on aggregate to Kilmarnock in the play-off final. On 12 November 2016, he was sent off in a 1–1 draw at former club Hibernian after a reckless challenge on John McGinn. He made 38 appearances across the 2016–17 campaign, helping Falkirk to qualify for the play-offs with a second-place finish; he played both legs of the 4–3 aggregate defeat to Dundee United in the play-off semi-final. Taiwo left Falkirk Stadium after he was released by Falkirk manager Paul Hartley upon the conclusion of the 2017–18 season.

=== Hamilton Academical ===
On 24 June 2018, Taiwo signed with Scottish Premiership club Hamilton Academical. However, he was judged to have been a poor signing by manager Martin Canning and he left Hamilton by mutual consent in May 2019 after making 19 appearances during the 2018–19 season. He retired due to injury in June 2019, at the age of 29.

== International career ==
Although he has played for England at youth level, he is eligible to represent Nigeria through his paternal grandfather. He was named as a substitute in all of England's games at the 2007 UEFA European Under-17 Football Championship, however, he did not feature in the defeat to Spain in the final. He did, though, make it off the bench in the 1–1 draw with Belgium and the 1–0 semi-final victory over France.

== Style of play ==
Taiwo "has a reputation as a tough-tackling and wholehearted player".

== Career statistics ==
Appearances and goals by club, season and competition
Club	Season	League			National cup (Note: Includes FA Cup, Scottish Cup)		League cup (Note: Includes Football League Cup, Scottish League Cup)		Other		Total	
Club	Season	Division	Apps	Goals	Apps	Goals	Apps	Goals	Apps	Goals	Apps	Goals
Chelsea	2008–09	Premier League	0	0	0	0	0	0	0	0	0	0
Chelsea	2009–10	Premier League	0	0	0	0	0	0	0	0	0	0
Chelsea	Total		0	0	0	0	0	0	0	0	0	0
Port Vale (loan)	2008–09	League Two	4	0	0	0	—		1 (Note: Appearances in the Football League Trophy)	0	5	0
Carlisle United	2009–10	League One	35	1	3	0	3	0	6	0	47	1
Carlisle United	2010–11	League One	46	2	3	0	1	0	6	1	56	3
Carlisle United	2011–12	League One	37	3	1	0	2	0	1	0	41	3
Carlisle United	Total		118	6	7	0	6	0	13	1	144	7
Hibernian	2012–13	Scottish Premier League	26	1	4	0	0	0	—		30	1
Hibernian	2013–14	Scottish Premiership	21	1	2	0	2	0	2 (Note: Appearances in the Europa League)	0	27	1
Hibernian	Total		47	2	6	0	2	0	2	0	57	2
Falkirk	2014–15	Scottish Championship	31	1	5	0	3	0	3 (Note: Appearances in the Scottish Challenge Cup)	2	42	3
Falkirk	2015–16	Scottish Championship	20	0	1	0	2	0	4 (Note: Two appearances in the Scottish Challenge Cup and two in the Premiership play-offs)	0	27	0
Falkirk	2016–17	Scottish Championship	31	1	0	0	4	0	3 (Note: One appearance in the Scottish Challenge Cup and two in the Premiership play-offs)	0	38	1
Falkirk	2017–18	Scottish Championship	22	1	3	0	3	0	2	0	30	1
Falkirk	Total		104	3	9	0	12	0	12	2	137	5
Hamilton Academical	2018–19	Scottish Premiership	16	0	1	0	2	0	—		19	0
Career total			289	11	23	0	22	0	28	3	362	14

== Honours ==
Carlisle United

- Football League Trophy: 2010–11; runner-up: 2009–10

Falkirk

- Scottish Cup runner-up: 2014–15
