= 2010–11 Carlisle United F.C. season =

Carlisle United F.C.
2010–11 season
- Chairman: Andrew Jenkins
- Manager: Greg Abbott
- Stadium: Brunton Park
- League One: 12th
- FA Cup: First round
- League Cup: Third round
- Football League Trophy: Winners

For the 2010–11 season, Carlisle United F.C. competed in Football League One.

== Players ==
=== First-team squad ===
Squad at end of season

Note: Flags indicate national team as defined under FIFA eligibility rules; some limited exceptions apply. Players may hold more than one non-FIFA nationality.

No.	Pos.	Nation	Player
1	GK	ENG	Adam Collin
2	DF	USA	Frank Simek
3	DF	SCO	Sean McDaid (Note: McDaid was born in Harrogate, England, but also qualified to represent Scotland internationally and represented Scotland at U-17, U-18, U-19 and U-20 level.)
5	DF	ENG	Danny Livesey
6	DF	IRL	Peter Murphy
8	MF	IRL	Graham Kavanagh
10	DF	ENG	Matty Robson
11	MF	ENG	Paul Thirlwell
12	MF	ENG	Tom Taiwo (on loan from Chelsea)
13	FW	CIV	François Zoko
14	MF	ENG	Ben Marshall (on loan from Stoke City)
15	FW	ENG	Craig Curran
17	MF	ENG	Liam Noble (on loan from Sunderland)

No.	Pos.	Nation	Player
18	FW	SCO	Rory Loy
19	FW	IRL	Paddy Madden
20	GK	ENG	Mark Gillespie
21	MF	IRL	James Berrett (Note: Berrett was born in Halifax, England, but also qualified to represent the Republic of Ireland internationally and represented the Republic of Ireland at U-18, U-19 and U-21 level.)
22	FW	ENG	Ryan Bowman
23	GK	ENG	Tony Caig
25	DF	SVK	Ľubomír Michalík
26	DF	NIR	Joe Dudgeon (Note: Dudgeon was born in Leeds, England, but also qualified to represent Northern Ireland internationally and represented Northern Ireland at U-21 level.) (on loan from Manchester United)
27	MF	NIR	Ben McKenna (Note: McKenna was born in Burnley, England, but also qualified to represent Northern Ireland internationally and represented Northern Ireland at U-17, U-18, and U-19 level.)
29	FW	BER	Nahki Wells
31	DF	ENG	Steven Swinglehurst
32	MF	ENG	Josh Todd
33	MF	FRA	Marco Gbarssin (Note: Gbarssin was born in Bordeaux, France, but also qualified to represent the Central African Republic internationally and made his international debut for the Central African Republic in August 2011.)

=== Left club during season ===
Note: Flags indicate national team as defined under FIFA eligibility rules; some limited exceptions apply. Players may hold more than one non-FIFA nationality.

No.	Pos.	Nation	Player
4	MF	ENG	Marc Bridge-Wilkinson (to Darlington)
7	MF	ENG	Kevan Hurst (on loan to Morecambe)
9	FW	WAL	Jason Price (on loan to Bradford City, Walsall, and Hereford United)
14	DF	IRL	Ian Harte (to Reading)
16	DF	NIR	Tony Kane (Note: Kane was born in Belfast, Northern Ireland, and represented Northern Ireland at U-21 level, but also qualified to represent the Republic of Ireland internationally and represented the Republic of Ireland at U-21 level.) (released)
16	DF	ENG	Gary Borrowdale (on loan from Queens Park Rangers)
17	FW	ENG	Richard Offiong (released)
18	MF	ENG	Andy Cook (to Barrow)
19	FW	ENG	Gary Madine (to Sheffield Wednesday)
24	DF	ENG	James Chester (Note: Chester was born in Warrington, England, but also qualified to represent Wales internationally through his mother and made his international debut for Wales in June 2014.) (on loan from Manchester United)

No.	Pos.	Nation	Player
24	DF	SCO	Liam Cooper (Note: Cooper was born in Kingston upon Hull, England, but also qualified to represent Scotland internationally through his paternal grandfather and represented Scotland at U-17 and U-19 level before making his international debut for Scotland in September 2019.) (on loan from Hull City)
26	MF	NIR	Oliver Norwood (Note: Norwood was born in Burnley, England, and represented England at U-16 and U-17 level, but also qualified to represent Northern Ireland internationally and represented Northern Ireland at U-19, U-21 and B level before making his international debut for Northern Ireland in August 2010.) (on loan from Manchester United)
26	DF	ENG	Ashley Eastham (on loan from Blackpool)
28	FW	USA	Mike Grella (on loan from Leeds United)
28	MF	IRL	Harry Arter (Note: Arter was born in Bexley, England, but also qualified to represent the Republic of Ireland internationally through his grandparents and represented the Republic of Ireland at U-17 and U-19 level before making his international debut for the Republic of Ireland in March 2015.) (on loan from AFC Bournemouth)
29	MF	NIR	Corry Evans (on loan from Manchester United)
29	DF	GLP	Miguel Comminges (on loan from Cardiff City)
30	DF	ENG	Thomas Cruise (on loan from Arsenal)
33	MF	FRA	Marco Gbarssin (on loan to Walsall)

== Competitions ==
=== League One ===
==== League table ====
Pos	Team	Pld	W	D	L	GF	GA	GD	Pts
10	Colchester United	46	16	14	16	57	63	−6	62
11	Brentford	46	17	10	19	55	62	−7	61
12	Carlisle United	46	16	11	19	60	62	−2	59
13	Charlton Athletic	46	15	14	17	62	66	−4	59
14	Yeovil Town	46	16	11	19	56	66	−10	59

Updated to match(es) played on 2 May 2011. Source: BBC
Rules for classification: 1) points; 2) goal difference; 3) number of goals scored.

==== Results summary ====
Overall								Home						Away					
Pld	W	D	L	GF	GA	GD	Pts	W	D	L	GF	GA	GD	W	D	L	GF	GA	GD
46	16	11	19	60	62	−2	59	9	7	7	34	26	+8	7	4	12	26	36	−10

==== Results by round ====
Round	1	2	3	4	5	6	7	8	9	10	11	12	13	14	15	16	17	18	19	20	21	22	23	24	25	26	27	28	29	30	31	32	33	34	35	36	37	38	39	40	41	42	43	44	45	46
Ground	H	A	H	A	H	A	H	A	A	H	H	A	H	A	H	H	A	H	H	H	A	H	A	H	A	H	A	A	A	H	H	A	A	H	A	H	H	A	A	A	A	H	A	H	A	H
Result	W	D	W	D	D	W	D	L	W	L	W	L	L	D	W	W	L	D	L	D	L	W	W	D	L	L	L	W	W	D	L	W	L	W	L	D	W	L	L	L	D	W	W	L	L	L
Position	3	4	1	1	2	2	3	7	3	4	2	6	8	10	8	4	8	9	11	14	15	14	11	11	11	13	16	13	12	12	13	10	12	8	10	9	8	9	11	14	14	12	10	11	11	12

Source: Statto.com
A = Away; H = Home; W = Win; D = Draw; L = Loss

==== Results ====
7 August 2010 1	Carlisle United	2–0	Brentford	Carlisle
15:00	Madine 22'; Harte 45+1' (pen.)	Report		Stadium: Brunton Park; Attendance: 5,913; Referee: Andy Haines

14 August 2010 2	Plymouth Argyle	1–1	Carlisle United	Plymouth
15:00	Patterson 90+4'	Report	Harte 68'	Stadium: Home Park; Attendance: 7,782; Referee: Roger East

21 August 2010 3	Carlisle United	4–1	Milton Keynes Dons	Carlisle
15:00	Zoko 42'; Berrett 45+3'; Madine 55'; Taiwo 61'	Report	Leven 64'	Stadium: Brunton Park; Attendance: 5,205; Referee: Mark Haywood

27 August 2010 4	Colchester United	1–1	Carlisle United	Colchester
19:45	Mooney 29'		Thirlwell 90+3'	Stadium: Colchester Community Stadium; Attendance: 4,475

4 September 2010 5	Carlisle United	0–0	Swindon Town	Carlisle
15:00				Stadium: Brunton Park; Attendance: 5,689

11 September 2010 6	Sheffield Wednesday	0–1	Carlisle United	Owlerton, Sheffield
15:00			Curran 36'	Stadium: Hillsborough Stadium; Attendance: 5,689

18 September 2010 7	Carlisle United	0–0	Brighton & Hove Albion	Carlisle
15:00				Stadium: Brunton Park; Attendance: 6,039

25 September 2010 8	Bournemouth	2–0	Carlisle United	Bournemouth
15:00	Garyy 48'; Symes 64' (pen.)			Stadium: Dean Court; Attendance: 6,103

28 September 2010 9	Hartlepool United	0–4	Carlisle United	Hartlepool
19:45			Michalík 8'; Madine 26', 36', 71'	Stadium: Victoria Park; Attendance: 3,419

2 October 2010 10	Carlisle United	0–1	Peterborough United	Carlisle
15:00			Mackail-Smith 32'	Stadium: Brunton Park; Attendance: 5,737

9 October 2010 11	Carlisle United	1–0	Notts County	Carlisle
15:00	Madine 68'			Stadium: Brunton Park; Attendance: 5,599

16 October 2010 12	Exeter City	2–1	Carlisle United	Exeter
	Logan 19', 22'		Robson 71'	Stadium: St James Park; Attendance: 5,324

23 October 2010 13	Carlisle United	3–4	Charlton Athletic	Carlisle
	Grella 58'; Curran 61'; Madine 77'		Jackson 23'; Anyinsah 38'; Benson 47', 90'	Stadium: Brunton Park; Attendance: 5,624

30 October 2010 14	Bristol Rovers	1–1	Carlisle United	Bristol
15:00	Lines 48'		Grella 87'	Stadium: Memorial Stadium; Attendance: 6,144

2 November 2010 15	Carlisle United	2–0	Tranmere Rovers	Carlisle
19:45	Berrett 42'; Murphy 49'			Stadium: Brunton Park; Attendance: 3,744

13 November 2010 16	Carlisle United	3–2	Southampton	Carlisle
15:00	Marshall 21'; Harding 30' (o.g.); Chester 57'		Oxlade-Chamberlain 49'; Hammond 81'	Stadium: Brunton Park; Attendance: 6,578

20 November 2010 17	Walsall	2–1	Carlisle United	Bescot, Walsall
15:00	Richards 37', 53'		Grella 26'	Stadium: Bescot Stadium; Attendance: 4,256

23 November 2010 18	Carlisle United	1–1	Rochdale	Carlisle
19:45	Madine 20'; Michalík (red card) 61'		Jones 62' (pen.)	Stadium: Brunton Park; Attendance: 7,412

11 December 2010 19	Carlisle United	0–2	Dagenham & Redbridge	Carlisle
15:00			Elito 82'; Green 89'	Stadium: Brunton Park; Attendance: 4,380

1 January 2011 20	Carlisle United	2–2	Huddersfield Town	Carlisle
15:00	Zoko 71'; Chester 82'		P. Clarke 23'; Arfield 63'	Stadium: Brunton Park; Attendance: 5,904

3 January 2011 21	Tranmere Rovers	2–1	Carlisle United	Birkenhead
15:00	Goodison 39'; Thomas-Moore 80'		Berrett 78'	Stadium: Prenton Park; Attendance: 5,128

15 January 2011 22	Carlisle United	4–0	Bristol Rovers	Carlisle
15:00	Berrett 44' (pen.), 82' (pen.); Curran 57'; Cooper 73'		Coles (red card) 51'	Stadium: Brunton Park; Attendance: 4,229

22 January 2011 23	Notts County	0–1	Carlisle United	Nottingham
15:00			Zoko 55'	Stadium: Meadow Lane; Attendance: 6,327

29 January 2011 24	Carlisle United	2–2	Oldham Athletic	Carlisle
15:00	Zoko 75'; Berrett 90' (pen.)		White 8'; Taylor 33'	Stadium: Brunton Park; Attendance: 5,389

1 February 2011 25	Huddersfield Town	2–0	Carlisle United	Huddersfield
19:45	Roberts 39', 45'			Stadium: Kirklees Stadium; Attendance: 11,572

5 February 2011 26	Carlisle United	1–3	Walsall	Carlisle
15:00	Murphy 90'		Gill 37'; Gray 59', 73'	Stadium: Brunton Park; Attendance: 4,332

12 February 2011 27	Southampton	1–0	Carlisle United	Southampton
15:00	Lambert 43'			Stadium: St Mary's Stadium; Attendance: 25,076

15 February 2011 28	Oldham Athletic	0–1	Carlisle United	Oldham
19:45			Curran 80'	Stadium: Boundary Park; Attendance: 8,564

19 February 2011 29	Swindon Town	0–1	Carlisle United	Swindon
15:00			Berrett 29'	Stadium: County Ground; Attendance: 7,592

22 February 2011 30	Carlisle United	2–2	Exeter City	Carlisle
19:45	Curran 9'; Zoko 45+1'		Harley 13', 27'	Stadium: Brunton Park; Attendance: 3,962

26 February 2011 31	Carlisle United	0–1	Sheffield Wednesday	Carlisle
15:00			Miller 20'	Stadium: Brunton Park; Attendance: 6,834

1 March 2011 32	Charlton Athletic	1–3	Carlisle United	Charlton, London
19:45	Wright-Phillips 10'		Marshall 27'; Curran 62'; Rory Loy 80'	Stadium: The Valley; Attendance: 12,797

5 March 2011 33	Brighton & Hove Albion	4–3	Carlisle United	Withdean, Brighton
15:00	Murray 23'; Barnes 53', 63'; Bridcutt 90+3'		Taiwo 3'; Marshall 60'; Arter 90+2'	Stadium: Withdean Stadium; Attendance: 7,466

8 March 2011 34	Carlisle United	1–0	Hartlepool United	Carlisle
19:45	Zoko 67'			Stadium: Brunton Park; Attendance: 3,898

12 March 2011 35	Peterborough	6–0	Carlisle United	Peterborough
15:00	Rowe 2'; Mackail-Smith 34'; Boyd 45', 83'; Bennet 77'; Ball 90'			Stadium: London Road Stadium; Attendance: 6,467

15 March 2011 36	Carlisle United	1–1	Plymouth Argyle	Carlisle
19:45	Berrett 34'		Bolasie 84'	Stadium: Brunton Park; Attendance: 3,354

19 March 2011 37	Carlisle United	1–0	Bournemouth	Carlisle
15:00	Murphy 26'			Stadium: Brunton Park; Attendance: 4,385

25 March 2011 38	Brentford	2–1	Carlisle United	Brentford, London
15:00	Schlupp 74', 83'		Michalík 88'	Stadium: Griffin Park; Attendance: 4,365

29 March 2011 39	Yeovil Town	1–0	Carlisle United	Yeovil
19:45	Obika 59'			Stadium: Huish Park; Attendance: 3,331

9 April 2011 40	Milton Keynes Dons	3–2	Carlisle United	Denbigh, Milton Keynes
15:00	Powell 26'; Balanta 81'; Clayton 90+4'		Noble 26'; Berrett pen 69'	Stadium: Stadium MK; Attendance: 10,795

12 April 2011 41	Leyton Orient	0–0	Carlisle United	Leyton, London
19:45				Stadium: Brisbane Road; Attendance: 3,228

16 April 2011 42	Carlisle United	1–1	Colchester United	Carlisle
15:00	Berrett 9'; Curran 26', 61'; Noble 31'		Gillespie 71'	Stadium: Brunton Park; Attendance: 4,405

23 April 2011 43	Rochdale	2–3	Carlisle United	Rochdale
15:00	Thompson 30'; Done 49'		Holness 49' (o.g.); Liam Noble 60'; Matty Robson 65'	Stadium: Spotland Stadium; Attendance: 3,762

25 April 2011 44	Carlisle United	0–1	Leyton Orient	Carlisle
19:45		Report	Téhoué 36'	Stadium: Brunton Park; Attendance: 4,685; Referee: Mark Brown

30 April 2011 45	Dagenham & Redbridge	3–0	Carlisle United	Dagenham, London
15:00	Nurse 4', 29'; Green 84' (yellow card) 61' (yellow-red card) 87'	Report		Stadium: Victoria Road; Attendance: 2,693; Referee: Darren Drysdale

7 May 2011 46	Carlisle United	0–2	Yeovil Town	Carlisle
15:00		Report	Obika 26'; Bowditch 69'	Stadium: Brunton Park; Attendance: 6,473; Referee: Jock Waugh

=== FA Cup ===
6 November 2010 Round 1	Carlisle United	6–0	Tipton Town	Carlisle
15:00	Zoko 5', 19'; Madine 9', 12', 41', 82'			Stadium: Brunton Park; Attendance: 4,241; Referee: Andrew Madley

27 November 2010 Round 2	Carlisle United	3–2	Tamworth	Carlisle
15:00	Madine 50'; Zoko 86'; Chester 90'		Marshall 30'; Thomas 75'	Stadium: Brunton Park; Attendance: 3,599

8 January 2011 Round 3	Torquay United	1–0	Carlisle United	Torquay
15:00	O'Kane 6'			Stadium: Plainmoor; Attendance: 3,005

=== League Cup ===
10 August 2010 Round 1	Carlisle United	0–1	Huddersfield Town	Carlisle
19:45			Rhodes 89'	Stadium: Brunton Park; Attendance: 3,475; Referee: David Webb

=== Football League Trophy ===
5 October 2010 Round 2	Carlisle United	2–2 (4–3 p)	Port Vale	Carlisle
19:45	Chester 76'; Price 81'		Norwood 42' (o.g.); M.Richards 64'	Stadium: Brunton Park; Attendance: 2,273

9 November 2010 Quarter Final	Carlisle United	3–1	Crewe Alexandra	Carlisle
19:45	Donaldson 14' (o.g.); Murphy 72', 85'		Donaldson 76'	Stadium: Brunton Park; Attendance: 2,142

30 November 2010 Semi Final	Carlisle United	3–1	Sheffield Wednesday	Carlisle
19:45	Zoko 30'; Michalík 61'; Marshall 69'		Purse 85'	Stadium: Brunton Park; Attendance: 3,149

18 January 2011 Area Final Leg 1	Carlisle United	4–0	Huddersfield Town	Carlisle
19:45	Marshall 19'; Taiwo 23'; Murphy 62'; Michalík 65'			Stadium: Brunton Park; Attendance: 3,706

8 February 2011 Area Final Leg 2	Huddersfield Town	3–0 (3–4 agg.)	Carlisle United	Huddersfield
19:45	Pilkington 30'; Lee 70', 81'			Stadium: Kirklees Stadium; Attendance: 6,528

3 April 2011 Final	Brentford	0–1	Carlisle United	Wembley, London
19:45			Peter Murphy 12'	Stadium: Wembley Stadium; Attendance: 40,476
