= Ryan Bowman =

English association football player (born 1991)

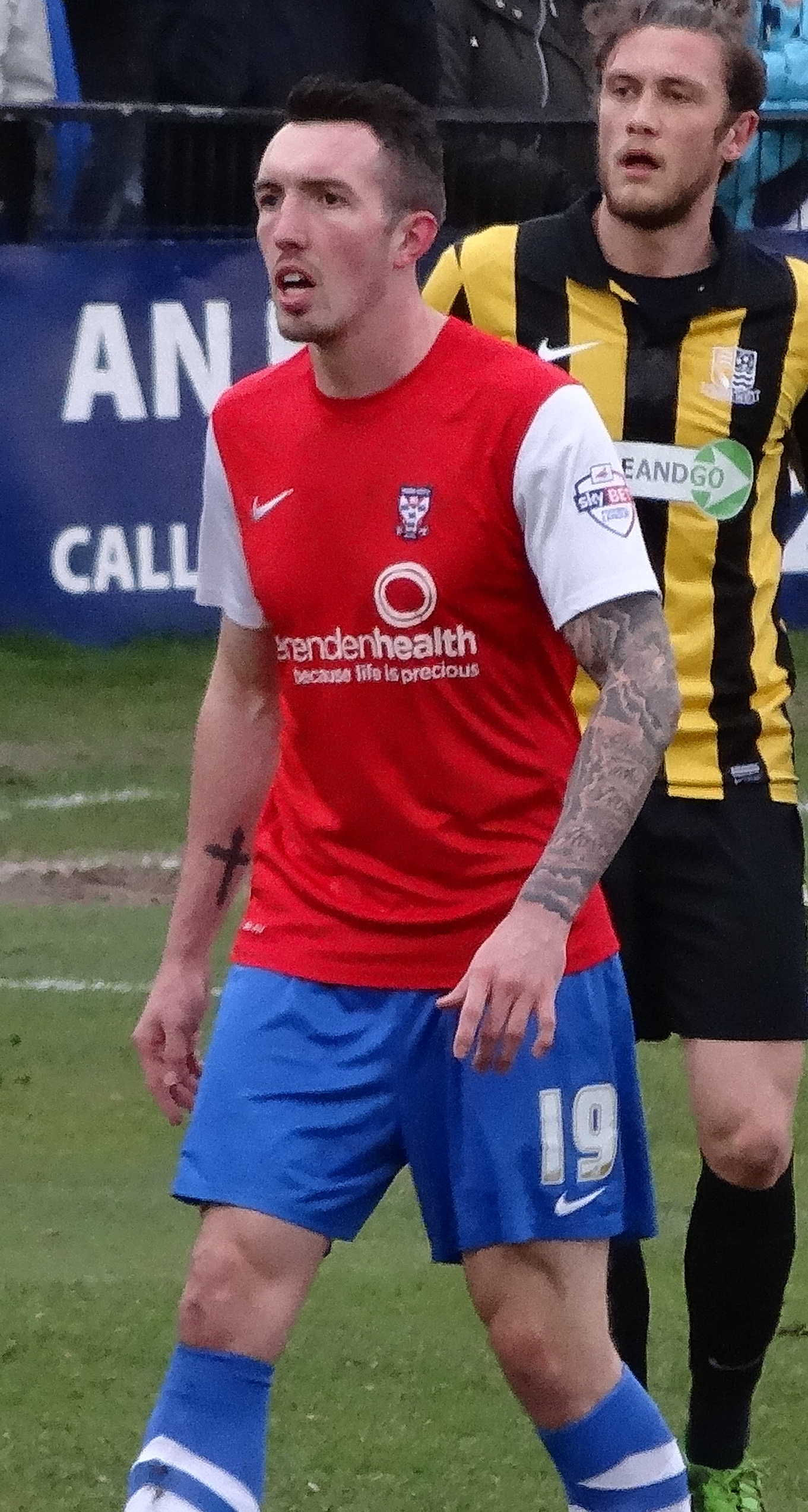
- Bowman with York City in 2014

Personal information
- Full name: Ryan Michael Bowman
- Date of birth: 30 November 1991 (age 34)
- Place of birth: Carlisle, England
- Height: 6 ft 2 in (1.88 m)
- Position: Striker

Youth career
- –2009: Carlisle United

Senior career*
Years	Team	Apps	(Gls)
2009–2011	Carlisle United	9	(0)
2010	→ Workington (loan)	9	(2)
2010	→ Workington (loan)	5	(0)
2011–2012	Darlington	40	(10)
2012–2013	Hereford United	39	(15)
2013–2014	York City	37	(8)
2014–2015	Torquay United	37	(12)
2015–2016	Gateshead	48	(19)
2016–2019	Motherwell	72	(10)
2019–2021	Exeter City	97	(32)
2021–2024	Shrewsbury Town	117	(15)
2024–2025	Cheltenham Town	17	(3)
- * Club domestic league appearances and goals as of 19:50, 9 July 2025 (UTC)

Ryan Michael Bowman (born 30 November 1991) is an English professional footballer who most recently played as a striker for EFL League Two club Cheltenham Town. In July 2025, Bowman received a three-and-a-half year ban from football after admitting to a number of betting offences that occurred over an eight year period.

== Career ==
=== Carlisle United ===
Bowman was born in Carlisle, Cumbria. He started his career with hometown club Carlisle United, first being part of the Centre of Excellence before signing a Youth Training Scheme contract in 2008. He scored 22 goals in his second season at youth level to make him the top scorer for the under-18 team. After also impressing for the reserve team, Bowman joined Conference North club Workington on a one-month loan on 13 February 2010. He scored his first goal in the 1–0 win against Redditch United on 27 February 2010, with a volley in the fourth minute. Bowman scored two goals in 10 matches on loan with Workington before being recalled by Carlisle due to injuries. He made his first-team debut for Carlisle in a 3–1 victory at home to Bristol Rovers in League One on 2 April 2010, coming on as a substitute for Scott Dobie in the 89th minute. He made six appearances for Carlisle in the 2009–10 season. He was given the club's Youth Training Scheme Player of the Year award, and during the summer of 2010 signed a one-year professional contract.

On 19 October 2010, Bowman rejoined Workington on a one-month loan, and finished his second spell without scoring in eight appearances. The following calendar year on 1 January 2011, Bowman made his first appearance of 2010–11 for Carlisle, coming off the substitutes' bench in the 79th minute to replace Craig Curran in a 2–2 home draw with Huddersfield Town. He made two further substitute appearances in 2010–11 before being released by Carlisle on 4 May 2011.

=== Darlington ===
After impressing on trial, Bowman signed for Conference Premier club Darlington on 4 August 2011 on a sixth-month contract. He made his debut for Darlington in a 1–0 home win over Braintree Town on 13 August 2011, before scoring his first two goals on 29 August in a 3–1 victory over Lincoln City. The first came after 29 seconds with a drilled low shot and scored the second from 17 yards, before assisting the third goal for John Campbell after pouncing on Joe Anyon's misplaced pass. On 29 October 2011, he scored his first ever goal in the FA Cup, during a 1–1 draw in the fourth qualifying round against Hinckley United.

Darlington suffered financial difficulties during Bowman's time at the club and his contract was terminated on 16 January 2012, along with the rest of the playing squad and caretaker manager Craig Liddle, though the club retained their registrations so they were eligible to play on a non-contract basis. Bowman ended a run of 17 league matches without a goal after he scored the opening goal in the 3–1 loss away at Alfreton Town on 18 February 2012. He scored his last two goals for Darlington in the 3–1 home victory against Kettering Town on the final day of 2011–12 on 28 April 2012. Bowman scored 11 goals in 42 appearances as Darlington finished the season in the relegation zone, with the club being demoted to the Northern League.

=== Hereford United ===
After a short trial with Hereford United, Bowman signed for the Conference Premier club on 24 July 2012 on a one-year contract. Manager Martin Foyle commented that "I just feel that's the type of player I'll have. Someone who is keen, hungry and who feels they have got a point to prove." Bowman made a scoring debut with Hereford's last goal in the 89th minute of a 4–2 win at home to Ebbsfleet United on 25 August 2012. He scored two goals in Hereford's 3–1 home victory over League One team Shrewsbury Town in the FA Cup first round on 3 November 2012. He finished 2012–13 as Hereford's top scorer with 19 goals from 43 appearances.

=== York City ===
Having been offered a new contract by Hereford, Bowman signed for League Two club York City on 24 May 2013 on a two-year contract. With him being under 23 years of age, York would pay Hereford a compensation fee, which was set at £20,000 by a tribunal. Bowman made his debut as a 78th-minute substitute for Sander Puri in a 1–0 victory over Northampton Town on 3 August 2013, in the first match of 2013–14. His first goals for York came with two headers in a 2–2 away draw with Cheltenham Town on 2 November 2013. Bowman played in both play-off matches against Fleetwood Town, entering the first as a 62nd-minute substitute for Ryan Brobbel and starting the second, although York were eliminated 1–0 on aggregate. He finished 2013–14 with 43 appearances and eight goals.

=== Torquay United ===
Despite having one year remaining on his contract at York, Bowman was allowed to sign for newly relegated Conference Premier club Torquay United on 3 July 2014 on a two-year contract.

=== Gateshead ===
Bowman signed for Torquay's National League rivals Gateshead on 17 July 2015 for an undisclosed fee.

=== Motherwell ===
Bowman signed for Scottish Premiership club Motherwell on 31 August 2016 on a two-year contract for an undisclosed fee. He made his debut on 10 September 2016, as Motherwell drew 1–1 away to Ross County.

=== Exeter City ===
Bowman signed for League Two club Exeter City on 2 January 2019 for an undisclosed nominal fee as a replacement for Jayden Stockley, who was expected to leave the club.

=== Shrewsbury Town ===
On 17 June 2021, Bowman joined League One side Shrewsbury Town on a two-year deal, with the option of a further year. He scored his first goal for the club on 18 September in a 1–1 draw against Sheffield Wednesday at Hillsborough. On 9 October, during a League One fixture against Ipswich Town at Portman Road, Bowman was substituted after 35 minutes after experiencing palpitations. After being assessed by medical staff from both sides, he was taken to Ipswich Hospital for checks and was later discharged. On 23 October, Bowman scored a hat-trick in a 4–1 win at home to Cambridge United. In June 2022, Bowman underwent an ablation heart surgery to treat irregular rhythms.

He was released by Shrewsbury at the end of the 2023–24 season.

== Career statistics ==
As of match played 1 January 2025

Appearances and goals by club, season and competition
Club	Season	League			National Cup (Note: Includes FA Cup, Scottish Cup)		League Cup (Note: Includes League Cup, Scottish League Cup)		Other		Total	
Club	Season	Division	Apps	Goals	Apps	Goals	Apps	Goals	Apps	Goals	Apps	Goals
Carlisle United	2009–10	League One	6	0	0	0	0	0	0	0	6	0
Carlisle United	2010–11	League One	3	0	0	0	0	0	0	0	3	0
Carlisle United	Total		9	0	0	0	0	0	0	0	9	0
Workington (loan)	2009–10	Conference North	9	2	—		—		1 (Note: Appearance(s) in FA Trophy)	0	10	2
Workington (loan)	2010–11	Conference North	5	0	2	0	—		1	0	8	0
Workington (loan)	Total		14	2	2	0	—		2	0	18	2
Darlington	2011–12	Conference Premier	40	10	2	1	—		0	0	42	11
Hereford United	2012–13	Conference Premier	39	15	4	4	—		0	0	43	19
York City	2013–14	League Two	37	8	2	0	1	0	3 (Note: One appearance in Football League Trophy, two in League Two play-offs)	0	43	8
Torquay United	2014–15	Conference Premier	37	12	1	0	—		6	6	44	18
Gateshead	2015–16	National League	41	16	1	1	—		5	3	47	20
Gateshead	2016–17	National League	7	3	—		—		—		7	3
Gateshead	Total		48	19	1	1	—		5	3	54	23
Motherwell	2016–17	Scottish Premiership	24	2	0	0	—		—		24	2
Motherwell	2017–18	Scottish Premiership	32	7	3	1	7	2	—		42	10
Motherwell	2018–19	Scottish Premiership	16	1	—		4	1	—		20	2
Motherwell	Total		72	10	3	1	11	3	—		86	14
Exeter City	2018–19	League Two	18	5	—		—		—		18	5
Exeter City	2019–20	League Two	37	13	3	1	0	0	7 (Note: Four appearances in EFL Trophy, three appearances and one goal in League Two play-offs)	1	47	15
Exeter City	2020–21	League Two	42	14	3	0	1	0	1 (Note: Appearances in EFL Trophy)	0	47	14
Exeter City	Total		97	32	6	1	1	0	8	1	112	34
Shrewsbury Town	2021–22	League One	42	10	3	3	1	0	1	0	47	13
Shrewsbury Town	2022–23	League One	38	4	2	0	2	0	2	0	44	4
Shrewsbury Town	2023–24	League One	37	1	3	3	1	0	3	1	44	5
Shrewsbury Town	Total		117	15	8	6	4	0	6	1	135	22
Cheltenham Town	2024–25	League Two	17	3	1	0	0	0	3	0	21	3
Career total			527	126	30	14	17	3	33	11	607	154
