= 2010–11 Football League Trophy =

Johnstone's Paint Trophy

Tournament details
- Country: England; Wales
- Teams: 48

Final positions
- Champions: Carlisle United
- Runners-up: Brentford

Tournament statistics
- Matches played: 49

The 2010–11 Football League Trophy, known as the Johnstone's Paint Trophy for sponsorship reasons, is the 30th season in the history of the competition. It is a knock-out tournament for English football clubs in League One and League Two, the third and fourth tiers of English football.

In all, 48 clubs entered the competition. It is split into two sections, Northern and Southern, with the winners of each section contesting the final at Wembley Stadium. The first round took place on 30 August 2010.

Southampton were the defending champions, but lost to Swindon Town in the first round.

Carlisle United, the previous year's runner-up, won the competition, beating Brentford 1-0 in the final.

== First round ==
The draw for the first round of the competition took place on 14 August 2010. Sixteen clubs were given a bye into the second round, and the remaining 32 clubs, including the holders, were divided into four geographical regions. Among the clubs receiving a bye in the northern section were Huddersfield Town and Peterborough United, while in the southern section West Country clubs Bristol Rovers and Plymouth Argyle entered at the second round stage.

=== Northern Section ===
Tie no	Home team	Score	Away team	Attendance
North-West
1	Macclesfield Town	1–0	Morecambe	720
2	Oldham Athletic	0–1	Shrewsbury Town	2,703
3	Port Vale	2–1	Rochdale	2,442
4	Tranmere Rovers	1–1	Accrington Stanley	2,020
Accrington Stanley won 5 – 3 on penalties but later withdrew from the competition
North-East
5	Hartlepool United	4–0	Northampton Town	1,359
6	Rotherham United	1–0	Lincoln City	1,677
7	Sheffield Wednesday	2–1	Notts County	10,551
8	Walsall	1–2	Chesterfield	1,793

=== Southern Section ===
Tie no	Home team	Score	Away team	Attendance
South-West
1	Aldershot Town	2–0	Oxford United	1,607
2	Bournemouth	0–0	Torquay United	3,140
Torquay United won 3 – 0 on penalties
3	Southampton	0–3	Swindon Town	8,333
4	Yeovil Town	1–3	Exeter City	2,954
South-East
5	Brighton & Hove Albion	0–2	Leyton Orient	3,124
6	Charlton Athletic	1–0	Dagenham & Redbridge	4,630
7	Southend United	0–0	Gillingham	3,073
Southend United won 4 – 3 on penalties
8	Stevenage	0–1	Brentford	1,916

Byes

Northern section
Bradford City, Burton Albion, Bury, Carlisle United, Crewe Alexandra, Huddersfield Town, Peterborough United, Stockport County.

Southern section
Barnet, Bristol Rovers, Cheltenham Town, Colchester United, Hereford United, Milton Keynes Dons, Plymouth Argyle, Wycombe Wanderers.

== Second round ==
The second round draw took place on 4 September 2010, with matches played in the week commencing 4 October 2010. Accrington Stanley were due to play Stockport County but the game was postponed because Accrington played an ineligible player in their first round match against Tranmere; Accrington subsequently withdrew from the competition and Tranmere were reinstated.

=== Northern Section ===
Tie no	Home team	Score	Away team	Attendance
North-West
1	Tranmere Rovers	0–0	Stockport County	2,223
Tranmere Rovers won 4 – 3 on penalties
2	Macclesfield Town	2–4	Crewe Alexandra	1,103
3	Bury	0–0	Shrewsbury Town	1,944
Bury won 6 – 5 on penalties
4	Carlisle United	2–2	Port Vale	2,273
Carlisle United won 4 – 3 on penalties
North-East
5	Burton Albion	1–2	Rotherham United	1,360
6	Hartlepool United	1–0	Bradford City	1,728
7	Sheffield Wednesday	2–2	Chesterfield	15,003
Sheffield Wednesday won 8 – 7 on penalties
8	Huddersfield Town	3–2	Peterborough United	2,904

=== Southern Section ===
Tie no	Home team	Score	Away team	Attendance
South-West
1	Bristol Rovers	1–0	Aldershot Town	4,050
2	Swindon Town	2–0	Torquay United	3,625
3	Cheltenham Town	0–2	Plymouth Argyle	1,597
4	Hereford United	0–3	Exeter City	1,286
South-East
5	Colchester United	0–2	Wycombe Wanderers	2,379
6	Leyton Orient	0–0	Brentford	1,152
Brentford won 5 – 4 on penalties
7	Milton Keynes Dons	1–2	Charlton Athletic	3,773
8	Barnet	1–3	Southend United	1,356

== Area quarter-finals ==
The draw for the area quarter-finals took place on 9 October 2010 on Soccer AM, with matches played in the week commencing 8 November 2010.

=== Northern Section ===
Tie no	Home team	Score	Away team	Attendance
1	Carlisle United	3–1	Crewe Alexandra	2,142
2	Rotherham United	2–5	Huddersfield Town	2,185
3	Bury	0–1	Tranmere Rovers	1,961
4	Sheffield Wednesday	4–1	Hartlepool United	10,909

=== Southern Section ===
Tie no	Home team	Score	Away team	Attendance
1	Swindon Town	1–1	Brentford	3,469
Brentford won 4–2 on penalties
2	Plymouth Argyle	1–2	Exeter City	9,431
3	Southend United	0–1	Charlton Athletic	4,373
4	Wycombe Wanderers	3–6	Bristol Rovers	1,591

== Area semi-finals ==
The draw for the area semi-finals took place on 13 November 2010 on Soccer AM, with matches due to be played in the week commencing 29 November 2010. Due to snow, only one match was eventually played during this week. One match was played on 14 December 2010 and broadcast live.

=== Northern Section ===
Tie no	Home team	Score	Away team	Attendance
1	Tranmere Rovers	0–2	Huddersfield Town	2,598
2	Carlisle United	3–1	Sheffield Wednesday	3,149

=== Southern Section ===
Tie no	Home team	Score	Away team	Attendance
1	Brentford	0–0	Charlton Athletic	2,783
Brentford won 3–1 on penalties
2	Bristol Rovers	2–2	Exeter City	3,881
Exeter City won 5–4 on penalties

== Area finals ==
The area finals, which serve as the semi-finals for the entire competition, were contested over two legs, home and away.

=== Northern Section ===
18 January 2011	Carlisle United	4–0	Huddersfield Town	Brunton Park, Carlisle
19:45 GMT	Marshall 19'; Taiwo 23'; Murphy 62'; Michalík 65'	Report		Attendance: 3,706; Referee: Eddie Ilderton

8 February 2011	Huddersfield Town	3–0	Carlisle United	Galpharm Stadium, Huddersfield
19:45 GMT	Pilkington 30'; Lee 70', 81'			Attendance: 6,528; Referee: Steve Tanner

Carlisle United won 4–3 on aggregate

=== Southern Section ===
17 January 2011	Brentford	1–1	Exeter City	Griffin Park, London
19:45 GMT	Alexander 64'	Report	Cureton 39'	Attendance: 3,093; Referee: Mark Haywood

7 February 2011	Exeter City	1–2	Brentford	St James Park, Exeter
19:45 GMT	Nardiello 90+5'	Report	Saunders 20'; Alexander 26'	Attendance: 5,322; Referee: Kevin Wright

Brentford won 3–2 on aggregate

== Final ==
3 April 2011
13:30 BST

Brentford	0–1	Carlisle United
	Report	Murphy 12'

Wembley Stadium, London
Attendance: 40,476
Referee: Graham Salisbury
