= Ian Harte =

Irish footballer & agent (born 1977)

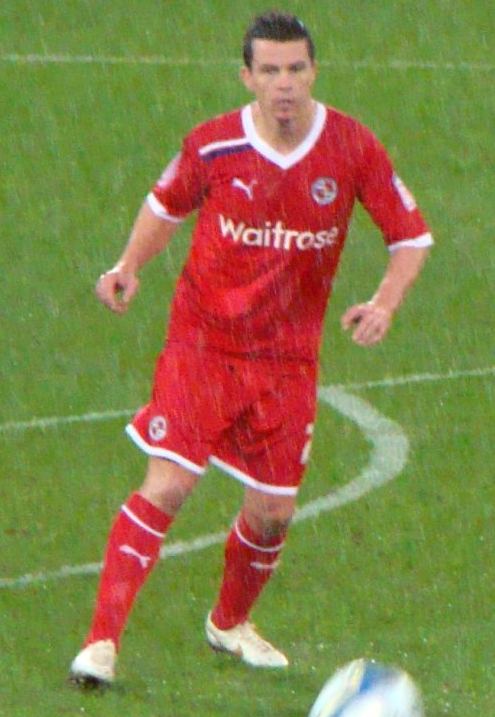
- Harte playing for Reading in 2012

Personal information
- Full name: Ian Patrick Harte
- Date of birth: 31 August 1977 (age 49)
- Place of birth: Drogheda, Ireland
- Height: 1.75 m (5 ft 9 in)
- Positions: Left back; midfielder

Youth career
- Drogheda United
- St. Kevin's Boys
- –1995: Home Farm
- 1995–1996: Leeds United

Senior career*
Years	Team	Apps	(Gls)
1996–2004	Leeds United	213	(28)
2004–2007	Levante	66	(10)
2007–2008	Sunderland	8	(0)
2008–2009	Blackpool	4	(0)
2009–2010	Carlisle United	52	(19)
2010–2013	Reading	88	(15)
2013–2015	AFC Bournemouth	28	(1)
Total		459	(73)

International career
1996–2007	Republic of Ireland	64	(12)
- * Club domestic league appearances and goals

Ian Patrick Harte (born 31 August 1977) is an Irish football agent and former professional footballer who played as a left back. He was best known for his ability to score goals from long range, including being a free kick specialist.

He began his career at Leeds United making 288 official appearances across nine seasons. Following their relegation and financial difficulties in 2004 he joined La Liga team Levante. He returned to England in 2007, featuring at a variety of clubs and winning the Championship title at Reading in 2012 and AFC Bournemouth three years later.

Harte earned 64 international caps for the Republic of Ireland between 1996 and 2007, scoring 12 goals. He was included in their squad at the 2002 FIFA World Cup.

== Club career ==
=== Leeds United ===
Harte was born in Drogheda to Pat and Lena Harte. He grew up in Newfield, where he attended St Oliver's Community College and played for Newtown Blues GAA club, winning many sports titles (at both GAA and football) at all levels. He started out at St. Kevin's Boys F.C. in Whitehall in Dublin at U-12 where his elder brother Michael had played for three years already in the DDSL (Dublin and District Schoolboys League). Michael went on to play for Drogheda United in the League of Ireland.

Harte joined Leeds United from Home Farm in 1995. However, Harte has stated in interviews that he joined Leeds from St. Kevin's and that it was his uncle, Gary Kelly, who joined Leeds from Home Farm. He made his senior debut in 1996 and went on to play for the Yorkshire side for nine seasons alongside his uncle Gary Kelly. When Leeds bought Dominic Matteo it looked as though Harte might become second choice. Matteo though ended up playing at centre half and Harte kept his place on the left. In the 1999–2000 season he helped Leeds reach the semi-finals of the UEFA Cup, playing twelve games, scoring one goal. He then helped them reach the same stage of the UEFA Champions League in the 2000–01 season, playing 17 games and scoring three goals in the competition.

Harte is also a proficient left-footed free kick and penalty taker, which was demonstrated in the vital league game against Arsenal in the 2002–03 season, where he scored Leeds' second goal from a 25-yard free kick. Leeds went on to win that game 3–2 to avoid relegation from the Premiership.

Harte scored at Highbury for three consecutive seasons (2000–01 to 2002–03). Arguably, Harte's most memorable moment at Leeds was scoring a free kick against Deportivo La Coruña in the Champions League quarter final first leg at Elland Road. Harte's later career at Leeds was not so successful, as his lack of pace was exposed and his goals started to dry up. He did score a penalty against Portsmouth in his last season at the club, but Leeds went on to lose that game and were relegated to the Championship.

=== Levante ===
Despite rumours, earlier in his career, that clubs including Barcelona and Milan were offering as much as £11 million for his services, in the end it was newly promoted Spanish La Liga club Levante who signed him on 9 July 2004, following the financial crisis at Leeds.

Harte scored Levante's first La Liga goal in 41 years in a 1–1 draw with Real Sociedad, with a free-kick on the first day of the 2004-05 season. He suffered a groin injury in January which sidelined him for most of the remainder of the season. Levante, in their first season in La Liga since 1965, were up to 5th position at one point (when Harte was healthy), but they still suffered relegation on the final day of the season due to a loss to Villarreal. The following season in the Segunda División was successful for both Harte and Levante as he was consistently first-choice left back, he scored nine goals in all competitions, and Levante were promoted back to La Liga at their first attempt. However, in the following season in La Liga, Harte was injured in August and failed to regain his place in the team once he returned from injury in January. This time though Levante finished in 15th place and were safe from relegation.

Before the start of the 2007–08 La Liga season, Levante coach Abel Resino told Harte that he was not in his plans, and Harte and the club agreed to terminate the remaining 12 months of his contract.

=== Sunderland ===
On 29 August 2007, after a trial period, it was announced that Harte had joined former international team-mate Roy Keane at Sunderland. He was initially signed on a one-year contract. However, he was subsequently transfer listed in January 2008 by Keane. Harte made his Sunderland debut as a late substitute in the club's 3–2 defeat away at Arsenal. On 4 June 2008, along with seven other players, he was released by Sunderland after only one year at the club.

During summer 2008 Harte spent time on trial at Wolverhampton Wanderers but rejected their eventual offer of a month-to-month contract and he was without a club for the start of the 2008–09 season. In September 2008 he trained with Sheffield United at the club's Shirecliffe training ground complex. He then played for the Blades reserve team in a 3–0 win against Newcastle United reserves.

On 22 October 2008, it was announced that Harte was on a one-week trial with Norwegian Premier League club Vålerenga hoping to impress manager Martin Andresen. He also spent time on trial at Charlton Athletic.

=== Blackpool ===
After spending a few weeks on trial with Championship club Blackpool, Harte signed for them on 11 December 2008 on a month-to-month contract basis. He made his debut for the Seasiders on 29 December 2008 in a 2–2 draw against Wolverhampton Wanderers at Bloomfield Road. Harte had his contract with Blackpool terminated by mutual consent on 2 February 2009.

Harte then agreed a contract with Scottish Premier League club St Mirren until the end of the 2008–09 season, but then unexpectedly pulled out of the move 24 hours later.

=== Carlisle United ===
On 26 March 2009, Harte signed a contract to the end of the season with Carlisle United and made his debut a couple of days later at home to Northampton Town. He won man of the match for his impressive performance but did not play for a month after breaking two fingers during the game. He returned to action on 25 April 2009, scoring a free kick in the 1–1 draw against Cheltenham Town. He also played in the last match of the season, which Carlisle won against Millwall to stay in League 1, at Northampton's expense. Harte signed a two-year contract with Carlisle United on 18 May 2009 keeping him at the club until the summer of 2011. He was in the team which reached the Football League Trophy final at Wembley Stadium in March 2010, though Carlisle lost 4–1 to Southampton. He finished the season as Carlisle's top goalscorer, scoring 18 times from defence.

In May 2010 he was selected in the League One PFA Team of the Year for the 2009–10 season.

Harte started the 2010–11 season in good goalscoring form, scoring a penalty in the league opener against Brentford and in Carlisle's first away game, against Plymouth Argyle.

=== Reading ===
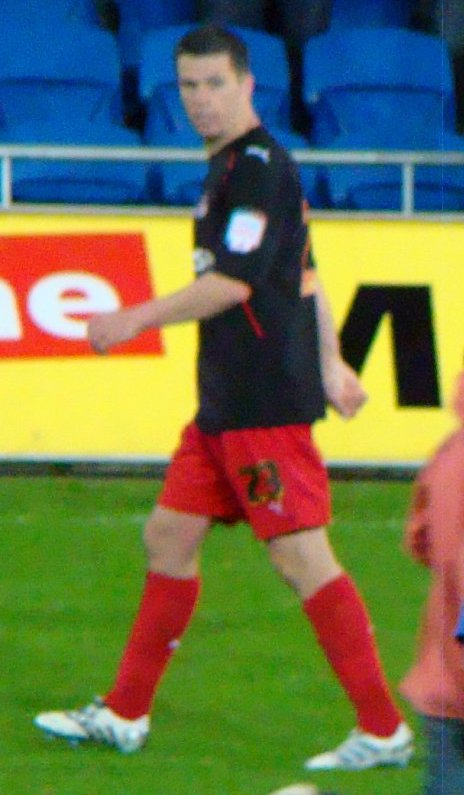
Harte playing for Reading in 2011

On 31 August 2010, Harte signed for Championship club Reading on a two-year deal for £100,000. After his move to Reading, Carlisle manager Greg Abbott said his disappointment at losing Harte was tempered by the money received for team strengthening. Harte thanked manager Abbott, saying "The move really came from nowhere but I have to be honest and say that it is nice to see a club at that level showing an interest. They are a big club who were in the Premier League just a few years ago. They are in the Championship and the chance to go and play at that level again was one I didn't want to miss. The difficult part was that I have really enjoyed my time at Carlisle. Greg Abbott has really looked after me and he was willing to give me a chance to get myself back into the game at a point when I didn't have a club. I can't thank him enough for that."

Harte scored on his debut from the penalty spot against Crystal Palace and then in his fourth appearance with a stunning free kick against Barnsley. He continued his fine scoring record (for a defender), which helped Reading maintain their challenge for the play-offs for the Premier League. On 9 April, Harte scored the opening goal in a 4–3 away win at promotion-chasing Nottingham Forest. In April, he was named in the PFA Championship Team of the Year, following his appearance in the corresponding list for League One a year earlier. Harte also scored a superb free kick against Middlesbrough in a 5–2 win for Reading, and perhaps his best of the season away to Ipswich Town in a 3–1 win on 8 March. Harte was named as the Championship player of the month in March 2011. Harte also scored from the penalty spot away to Scunthorpe United on 12 April as Shane Long was unavailable; the game finished 2–0 to Reading.

Harte was part of a defence that shut out his old team Leeds United in 0–0 draws at both Elland Road and the Madejski. Harte was applauded throughout by the home fans (Leeds United). Harte played in a 3–2 defeat to Sheffield United at the Madejski Stadium on 25 April 2011. The game also involved a tribute for former Reading and Sheffield United player Chris Armstrong. Reading lost the game 3–2, the first defeat for Reading since 4 February 2011 to QPR.

Harte was named in the PFA Team of the Year for the second year running, after scoring 10 goals and helping to keep 14 clean sheets, though mainly for his set piece ability, having scored 6 free kicks, sharing corner duties with Jobi McAnuff and Brian Howard as well as being second in line to take penalties after Shane Long, scoring three. Harte also showed his aerial ability, with great power and accuracy in all of his headers.

In the 2011–12 season, Harte was one of the five key players who helped get Reading back to the Premier League along with Adam Federici, Jem Karacan, Kaspars Gorkšs and Jason Roberts. Once again, Harte was chosen for the PFA Team of the Year, becoming the only representative for Reading.

On 23 May 2012, it was announced that Harte had signed a new one-year deal keeping him at the Madejski Stadium until 2013 after being offered a new deal. Before signing a new deal with Reading, Harte has revealed he rejected the chance of a return to former club Leeds when he got a phone call about 10 days ago saying Leeds were interested but he insists he is happy to stay at Reading. On 15 May 2013 Harte announced on Twitter that he would be leaving Reading at the end of the season with the club confirming his release nine days later.

=== AFC Bournemouth and retirement ===
On 27 June 2013, fellow Championship team AFC Bournemouth announced that they had signed Harte on a one-year contract. He netted his only goal for the team on 29 March 2014, a long-range strike for Bournemouth's fourth in a 4–2 win away to Birmingham City.

On 18 April 2014, Harte signed a new one-year deal with the Cherries, keeping him contracted until June 2015. On 6 May 2015, four days after the team earned their first ever promotion to the Premier League, he was one of seven players told that he would be released. He then announced his retirement from football on 27 August 2015.

== Football agent ==
After retiring from football Harte became a football agent, with some of his clients including former Leeds United footballer Tyler Denton and Ipswich Town footballer Jack Clarke.

== International career ==
Harte played for the Ireland under-19 team in the 1996 UEFA European Under-18 Football Championship finals in Luxembourg and has represented the senior side on 63 occasions, scoring 12 goals. He was handed his international debut on 2 June 1996 against Croatia, having made just four appearances for Leeds, and his first goal came on his fourth cap, a 2–0 victory over Bolivia thirteen days later in the 1996 U.S. Cup. Harte earned a regular starting berth for the 1998 World Cup qualifying campaign.

However, as his club career flourished post 1998, Harte found himself out of the reckoning at international level though he returned for the 2002 World Cup qualifiers and was the only player to play every minute as Ireland managed to reach the finals. Harte also notched up four goals during the campaign, from left back, including a penalty against Iran in the play-off, though he struggled at the World Cup because of a toe injury. At the finals Ireland ended up reaching the round of 16 where they faced Spain; with the Irish trailing 1-0 they were awarded a penalty which Harte took, but his effort was saved by Iker Casillas. They ended up being awarded another penalty late on in the game which Robbie Keane took and scored as Harte had by this point been substituted off for David Connolly. The match finished 1-1 and the Irish eventually lost in a penalty shootout. After the World Cup the emergence of John O'Shea restricted his appearances under Brian Kerr.

He was recalled to the team for the home match against Israel on 4 June 2005 and the away game in the Faroe Islands four days later, scoring a free kick in the 2–2 home draw for the first, and a penalty in a 2–0 away win in the latter game. He made one appearance in Ireland's UEFA Euro 2008 qualifying campaign, his final cap, starting in a 2–1 away victory over San Marino. In total, Harte earned 64 international caps.

In May 2011, Harte criticised the national team's management when it emerged that manager Giovanni Trapattoni did not even realise that he was Irish and available to play for the national side, despite being in fine form for Reading.

== Career statistics ==
=== Club ===
Club	Season	League			National Cup		League Cup		Other		Total	
Club	Season	Division	Apps	Goals	Apps	Goals	Apps	Goals	Apps	Goals	Apps	Goals
Leeds United	1995–96	Premier League	4	0	0	0	1	0	0	0	5	0
Leeds United	1996–97	Premier League	14	2	1	0	3	1	—	—	18	3
Leeds United	1997–98	Premier League	12	0	3	0	0	0	—	—	15	0
Leeds United	1998–99	Premier League	35	4	5	2	1	0	3 (Note: Appearances in UEFA Cup)	0	44	6
Leeds United	1999–2000	Premier League	33	6	3	1	1	0	12	1	49	8
Leeds United	2000–01	Premier League	29	7	1	0	1	0	17 (Note: Appearances in Champions League)	4	48	11
Leeds United	2001–02	Premier League	36	5	1	0	2	0	8	1	47	6
Leeds United	2002–03	Premier League	27	3	3	0	1	0	5	0	36	3
Leeds United	2003–04	Premier League	23	1	1	0	2	1	—	—	26	2
Leeds United	Total		213	28	18	3	12	2	45	6	288	39
Levante	2004–05	La Liga	24	1	?	?	—	—	—	—	24	1
Levante	2005–06	Segunda División	36	9	?	?	—	—	—	—	36	9
Levante	2006–07	La Liga	6	0	?	?	—	—	—	—	6	0
Levante	Total		66	10	?	?	0	0	0	0	66	10
Sunderland	2007–08	Premier League	8	0	0	0	0	0	—	—	8	0
Blackpool	2008–09	Championship	4	0	1	0	0	0	—	—	5	0
Carlisle United	2008–09	League One	3	1	0	0	0	0	0	0	3	1
Carlisle United	2009–10	League One	45	16	4	1	3	1	7 (Note: Appearances in Football League Trophy)	0	59	18
Carlisle United	2010–11	League One	4	2	0	0	1	0	0	0	5	2
Carlisle United	Total		52	19	4	1	4	1	7	0	67	21
Reading	2010–11	Championship	40	11	4	0	0	0	3 (Note: Appearances in Championship play-offs)	0	47	11
Reading	2011–12	Championship	32	4	1	0	1	0	—	—	34	4
Reading	2012–13	Premier League	16	0	1	0	1	0	—	—	18	0
Reading	Total		88	15	6	0	2	0	3	0	99	15
AFC Bournemouth	2013–14	Championship	24	1	0	0	2	0	0	0	26	1
AFC Bournemouth	2014–15	Championship	4	0	2	0	3	0	0	0	9	0
Career total			439	72	31	4	23	3	55	6	547	85

=== International ===
Republic of Ireland
Year	Apps	Goals
1996	7	2
1997	9	0
1998	2	0
1999	3	0
2000	5	1
2001	10	4
2002	11	2
2003	7	0
2004	2	1
2005	5	2
2006	2	0
2007	1	0
Total	64	12

=== International goals ===
Scores and results list the Republic of Ireland's goal tally first.

No.	Date	Venue	Opponent	Score	Result	Competition
1	15 June 1996	Giants Stadium, East Rutherford, United States	Bolivia	3–0	3–0	1996 U.S. Cup
2	31 August 1996	Sportpark Eschen-Mauren, Eschen, Liechtenstein	Liechtenstein	4–0	5–0	1998 FIFA World Cup qualification
3	23 February 2000	Lansdowne Road, Dublin, Ireland	Czech Republic	2–2	3–2	Friendly
4	24 March 2001	GSP Stadium, Nicosia, Cyprus	Cyprus	2–0	4–0	2002 FIFA World Cup qualification
5	28 March 2001	Mini Estadi, Barcelona, Spain	Andorra	1–0	3–0	2002 FIFA World Cup qualification
6	6 October 2001	Lansdowne Road, Dublin, Ireland	Cyprus	1–0	4–0	2002 FIFA World Cup qualification
7	10 November 2001	Lansdowne Road, Dublin, Ireland	Iran	1–0	2–0	2002 FIFA World Cup qualification
8	27 March 2002	Lansdowne Road, Dublin, Ireland	Denmark	1–0	3–0	Friendly
9	16 October 2002	Lansdowne Road, Dublin, Ireland	Switzerland	1–1	1–2	UEFA Euro 2004 qualification
10	31 March 2004	Lansdowne Road, Dublin, Ireland	Czech Republic	2–0	2–1	Friendly
11	4 June 2005	Lansdowne Road, Dublin, Ireland	Israel	1–0	2–2	2006 FIFA World Cup qualification
12	8 June 2005	Tórsvøllur, Tórshavn, Faroe Islands	Faroe Islands	1–0	2–0	2006 FIFA World Cup qualification

== Honours ==
Leeds United

- FA Youth Cup: 1996–97

Levante

- Segunda División third-place promotion: 2005–06

Carlisle United

- Football League Trophy runner-up: 2009–10

Reading

- Football League Championship: 2011–12

Individual

- PFA Team of the Year: 1999–2000 Premier League, 2009–10 League One, 2010–11 Championship, 2011–12 Championship
