= 2009–10 Football League Trophy =

Tournament details
- Country: England; Wales
- Teams: 48

Final positions
- Champions: Southampton
- Runners-up: Carlisle United

The 2009–10 Football League Trophy, known as the 2009–10 Johnstone's Paint Trophy for sponsorship reasons, is the 29th Football League Trophy, a knockout competition for English football clubs in Leagues One and Two, the third and fourth tiers of English football.

The format is similar to that which has been used since 1996, with four first round regions; North-West, North-East, South-West and South-East; which were used for the first time in the second region, before a two-region format from the area quarter-finals (3rd round); North and South. The resulting regional winners then meet in the final.

Luton Town were the defending champions, but were unable to defend the trophy due to their relegation to the Conference.

The competition was won by Southampton who defeated Carlisle United 4–1 in the final.

== First round ==
Sixteen teams were granted byes to the Second Round, which were drawn on 3 August, while the remaining teams were drawn for the First Round ties on Soccer AM on 15 August 2009. As part of new rules enforced this season, teams who received byes the previous season were not allowed to receive byes this season. The First Round matches were played in the week commencing 31 August 2009.

=== Northern Section ===
Tie no	Home team	Score	Away team	Attendance
North-West
1	Oldham Athletic	1–2	Accrington Stanley	1,619
2	Crewe Alexandra	1–4	Stockport County	2,331
3	Walsall	0–0	Bury	2,314
Bury won 5 – 4 on penalties
4	Morecambe	2–2	Carlisle United	2,016
Carlisle United won 4 – 2 on penalties
North-East
5	Darlington	1 – 0	Lincoln City	828
6	Rochdale	1–2	Bradford City	1,800
7	Rotherham United	1–2	Huddersfield Town	2,246
8	Burton Albion	1–5	Chesterfield	1,493

=== Southern Section ===
Tie no	Home team	Score	Away team	Attendance
South-West
1	Wycombe Wanderers	2–2	Northampton Town	1,035
Northampton Town won 3 – 0 on penalties
2	Cheltenham Town	1–3	Torquay United	1,397
3	Hereford United	0–0	Bristol Rovers	970
Hereford United won 4 – 2 on penalties
4	A.F.C. Bournemouth	2–1	Yeovil Town	2,655
South-East
5	Barnet	2–0	Millwall	1,623
6	Norwich City	1–0	Brentford	12,540
7	Milton Keynes Dons	3–1	Dagenham & Redbridge	4,413
8	Gillingham	1–1	Colchester United	1,725
Gillingham won 4 – 3 on penalties

=== First round byes ===
==== Northern section ====
Grimsby Town, Hartlepool United, Leeds United, Macclesfield Town,
Notts County, Port Vale, Shrewsbury Town, Tranmere Rovers.

==== Southern section ====
Aldershot Town, Brighton & Hove Albion, Charlton Athletic, Exeter City,
Leyton Orient, Southampton, Southend United, Swindon Town.

== Second round ==
The Second Round draw took place on 5 September 2009, with matches to be played in the week commencing 5 October 2009.

=== Northern Section ===
Tie no	Home team	Score	Away team	Attendance
North-West
1	Accrington Stanley	2–0	Shrewsbury Town	819
2	Bury	2–1	Tranmere Rovers	1,903
3	Carlisle United	4–2	Macclesfield Town	1,753
4	Port Vale	3–1	Stockport County	3,154
North-East
5	Bradford City	2–2	Notts County	3,701
Bradford City won 3 – 2 on penalties
6	Leeds United	2–1	Darlington	8,429
7	Chesterfield	3–3	Huddersfield Town	3,003
Chesterfield won 4 – 2 on penalties
8	Hartlepool United	0–2	Grimsby Town	1,675

=== Southern Section ===
Tie no	Home team	Score	Away team	Attendance
South-West
1	Exeter City	1–1	Swindon Town	2,006
Swindon Town won 4 – 3 on penalties
2	Northampton Town	2–1	Bournemouth	1,718
3	Southampton	2–2	Torquay United	9,319
Southampton won 5 – 3 on penalties
4	Hereford United	2–2	Aldershot Town	897
Hereford United won 4 – 3 on penalties
South-East
5	Milton Keynes Dons	2–0	Southend United	4,792
6	Leyton Orient	1–0	Brighton & Hove Albion	1,457
7	Charlton Athletic	4–1	Barnet	4,522
8	Gillingham	0–1	Norwich City	2,814

== Area-quarter-finals ==
The draw for the area quarter-finals took place on 10 October 2009. The matches were played in the week commencing 9 November 2009.

=== Northern Section ===
Tie no	Home team	Score	Away team	Attendance
1	Leeds United	3–1	Grimsby Town	10,430
2	Accrington Stanley	3–2	Bury	1,637
3	Bradford City	2–2	Port Vale	5,096
Bradford City won 5 – 4 on penalties
4	Chesterfield	1–3	Carlisle United	2,878

=== Southern Section ===
Tie no	Home team	Score	Away team	Attendance
1	Milton Keynes Dons	3–1	Northampton Town	8,886
2	Leyton Orient	1–1	Hereford United	1,282
Hereford United won 3 – 2 on penalties
3	Swindon Town	0–0	Norwich City	4,978
Norwich City won 5 – 3 on penalties
4	Southampton	2–1	Charlton Athletic	13,906

== Area semi-finals ==
The draw for the area semi-finals took place on 14 November 2009. The matches were played in the week commencing 14 December 2009.

=== Northern Section ===
Tie no	Home team	Score	Away team	Attendance
1	Carlisle United	3–0	Bradford City	3,176
2	Leeds United	2–0	Accrington Stanley	12,696

=== Southern Section ===
Tie no	Home team	Score	Away team	Attendance
1	Southampton	2–2	Norwich City	15,453
Southampton won 6 – 5 on penalties
2	Hereford United	1–4	Milton Keynes Dons	1,367

== Area finals ==
The area finals, which serve as the semi-finals for the entire competition, were contested over two legs, home and away.

=== Northern Section ===
19 January 2010	Leeds United	1–2	Carlisle United	Elland Road, Leeds
19:45	Crowe 56'	Report	Kavanagh 21'; Anyinsah 84'	Attendance: 13,011; Referee: Andy Penn

9 February 2010	Carlisle United	2–3 (6–5 p)	Leeds United	Brunton Park, Carlisle
19:00	Clayton 33'; Hurst 72'	Report	Snodgrass 46'; Crowe 80'; Grella 86'	Attendance: 9,430; Referee: Hall
	Penalties
	Harte (penalty scored); Hurst (penalty scored); Madine (penalty scored); Keogh (penalty missed); Clayton (penalty scored); Horwood (penalty scored); Robson (penalty scored)		(penalty missed) Johnson; (penalty scored) Snodgrass; (penalty scored) McSheffrey; (penalty scored) Grella; (penalty scored) Gradel; (penalty scored) Kilkenny; (penalty missed) Lowry

Carlisle United 4–4 Leeds United on aggregate. Carlisle United won 6–5 on penalties.

=== Southern Section ===
20 January 2010	Milton Keynes Dons	0–1	Southampton	Stadium:mk, Milton Keynes
19:00		Report	Antonio 26'	Attendance: 7,918; Referee: Jonathan Moss

9 February 2010	Southampton	3–1	Milton Keynes Dons	St Mary's, Southampton
19:45	Lambert 15'; Woodards 30' (o.g.); Lallana 87'	Report	Randall 44'	Attendance: 29,901; Referee: Grant Hegley

Southampton won 4–1 on aggregate

== Final ==
28 March 2010	Carlisle United	1–4	Southampton	Wembley Stadium, London
13:30 BST	Madine 84'		Lambert 15' (pen.); Lallana 44'; Waigo 50'; Antonio 60'	Attendance: 73,476; Referee: Scott Mathieson

== Top scorers ==
Football League Trophy

Pos	Player	Team	Goals
1	Papa Waigo N'Diaye	Southampton	5
2	Drew Talbot	Chesterfield	4
3	Carl Baker	Stockport	3
3	Sam Baldock	MK Dons	3
3	Scott Dobie	Carlisle	3
3	Jermaine Easter	MK Dons	3
3	Steve Guinan	Northampton	3
3	Graham Kavanagh	Carlisle	3
3	Rickie Lambert	Southampton	3
3	Matty Robson	Carlisle	3
