= 2014–15 Carlisle United F.C. season =

Carlisle United F.C.
2014–15 season
- Chairman: Andrew Jenkins
- Manager: Graham Kavanagh (sacked on 1 September); Tony Caig (caretaker); Paul Thirlwell (caretaker); Keith Curle (from 19 September)
- Stadium: Brunton Park
- FA Cup: First round
- League Cup: First round
- League Trophy: Second round
- Top goalscorer: League: Kyle Dempsey (10); All: Kyle Dempsey (11)
- Highest home attendance: 8,105 vs Hartlepool United (2 May 2015)
- Lowest home attendance: 3,116 vs Cheltenham Town (3 March 2015)
- Average home league attendance: 4,376
Home colours	Away colours

The 2014–15 season was Carlisle United F.C.'s first campaign in back in the fourth tier of English football, League Two After Relegation From League One The Previous Season. The club finished 20th.

== Pre-season ==
The pre-season friendlies for the club were announced 25 June 2014.

15 July 2014	Penrith	0–6	Carlisle United	Penrith
19:30		Report	Gorman 2'; Paynter 9'; Potts 51'; Gillies 64'; Dempsey 74'; Beck 83'	Stadium: Frenchfield Park

19 July 2014	Barrow	1–1	Carlisle United	Barrow-in-Furness
15:00	Walker 7'	Report	Amoo 89'	Stadium: Holker Street; Attendance: 748

22 July 2014	Carlisle United	0–1	Sunderland	Carlisle
19:30		Report	Mandron 72'	Stadium: Brunton Park; Attendance: 3,616 (1,123 away fans)

26 July 2014	Workington	0–2	Carlisle United	Workington
15:00		Report	Gillies 39'; Meppen-Walter 47'	Stadium: Borough Park; Attendance: 772

29 July 2014	Dumbarton	0–2	Carlisle United	Dumbarton
19:45		Report	Amoo 48'; Dempsey 89'	Stadium: The Bet Butler Stadium

1 August 2014	Carlisle United	2–1	St Mirren	Carlisle
19:30	Grainger 24'; Kearns 75'	Report	Reilly 77'	Stadium: Brunton Park; Attendance: 1,559 (369 away fans)

== League Two ==
=== League table ===
Pos	Team	Pld	W	D	L	GF	GA	GD	Pts
18	York City	46	11	19	16	46	51	−5	52
19	Cambridge United	46	13	12	21	61	66	−5	51
20	Carlisle United	46	14	8	24	56	74	−18	50
21	Mansfield Town	46	13	9	24	38	62	−24	48
22	Hartlepool United	46	12	9	25	39	70	−31	45

Updated to match(es) played on 23 May 2015. Source: BBC Sport
Rules for classification: 1) Points; 2) Goal difference; 3) Number of goals scored

Overall								Home						Away					
Pld	W	D	L	GF	GA	GD	Pts	W	D	L	GF	GA	GD	W	D	L	GF	GA	GD
46	14	8	24	56	74	−18	50	9	5	9	35	37	−2	5	3	15	21	37	−16

Last updated: 3 May 2015.
Source: Football League Official Site

=== Results by matchday ===
Round	1	2	3	4	5	6	7	8	9	10	11	12	13	14	15	16	17	18	19	20	21	22	23	24	25	26	27	28	29	30	31	32	33	34	35	36	37	38	39	40	41	42	43	44	45	46
Ground	H	A	A	H	A	H	H	A	A	H	A	H	A	H	H	A	H	A	H	A	H	A	H	A	H	A	A	H	A	H	A	H	A	H	H	A	A	H	A	H	А	H	A	H	A	H
Result	L	L	D	D	L	D	L	L	L	W	W	W	L	L	W	L	W	L	L	L	W	W	L	L	L	W	L	W	W	L	L	L	L	W	L	D	W	D	L	D	L	W	D	W	L	D
Position	16	22	19	20	22	22	24	24	24	24	23	20	21	21	20	22	20	22	22	23	21	20	21	22	22	21	22	20	18	19	19	20	23	21	21	21	20	20	21	21	21	20	21	20	20	20

Updated to match(es) played on 3 May 2015. Source: Statto.com
A = Away; H = Home; W = Win; D = Draw; L = Loss

=== Matches ===
The fixtures for the 2014–15 season were announced on 18 June 2014 at 9am.

9 August 2014 1	Carlisle United	0–1	Luton Town	Carlisle
15:00		Report	Cullen 30'	Stadium: Brunton Park; Attendance: 6,766; Referee: Nigel Miller

16 August 2014 2	Wycombe Wanderers	3–1	Carlisle United	High Wycombe
15:00	Pierre 55'; Hayes 77' (pen.); Murphy 80'	Report	Potts 57'	Stadium: Adams Park; Attendance: 3,121; Referee: Charles Breakspear

19 August 2014 3	Cheltenham Town	0–0	Carlisle United	Cheltenham
19:45		Report		Stadium: Whaddon Road; Attendance: 2,341; Referee: Darren Deadman

23 August 2014 4	Carlisle United	1–1	Southend United	Carlisle
15:00	Sweeney 43'	Report	Clifford 45+1'	Stadium: Brunton Park; Attendance: 3,847; Referee: Chris Kavanagh

30 August 2014 5	Cambridge United	5–0	Carlisle United	Cambridge
15:00	Diallo 25'; Simpson 33', 45'; Stockley 83', 87'	Report		Stadium: Abbey Stadium; Attendance: 3,512; Referee: Carl Berry

6 September 2014 6	Carlisle United	4–4	AFC Wimbledon	Carlisle
15:00	Dempsey 13', 45+3'; Gillies 52'; Potts 70'	Report	Rigg 4'; Tubbs 22', 81' (pen.); Azeez 90+3'	Stadium: Brunton Park; Attendance: 3,955; Referee: Andy Haines

13 September 2014 7	Carlisle United	0–3	Bury	Carlisle
15:00		Report	Rose 48'; Jones 59'; Lowe 80'	Stadium: Brunton Park; Attendance: 3,975; Referee: Mark Brown

16 September 2014 8	Shrewsbury Town	1–0	Carlisle United	Shrewsbury
19:45	Grandison 42'	Report		Stadium: Greenhous Meadow; Attendance: 3,833; Referee: Graham Salisbury

20 September 2014 9	Mansfield Town	3–2	Carlisle United	Mansfield
15:00	Beevers 4'; Bingham 37', 41'	Report	Amoo 61'; Dempsey 71'	Stadium: Field Mill; Attendance: 3,117; Referee: Seb Stockbridge

27 September 2014 10	Carlisle United	1–0	Tranmere Rovers	Carlisle
15:00	Amoo 72'	Report		Stadium: Brunton Park; Attendance: 3,873; Referee: Jeremy Simpson

4 October 2014 11	Hartlepool United	0–3	Carlisle United	Hartlepool
15:00		Report	Rigg 54'; Elliott 82'; Beck 89'	Stadium: Victoria Park; Attendance: 3,927; Referee: Darren Bond

11 October 2014 12	Carlisle United	3–0	Stevenage Town	Carlisle
15:00	Potts 17'; Rigg 28'; Beck 87'	Report		Stadium: Brunton Park; Attendance: 4,011; Referee: David Webb

18 October 2014 13	Plymouth Argyle	1–0	Carlisle United	Plymouth
15:00	Alessandra 15'	Report		Stadium: Home Park; Attendance: 6,529; Referee: Pat Miller

21 October 2014 14	Carlisle United	3–4	Burton Albion	Carlisle
19:45	Dempsey 12'; Potts 45+5'; Asamoah 65'	Report	McCrory 5'; Bell 27; Blyth 40'; MacDonald 45+2'	Stadium: Brunton Park; Attendance: 4,266; Referee: Scott Duncan

25 October 2014 15	Carlisle United	2–1	Oxford United	Carlisle
15:00	Beck 73'; Asamoah 89'	Report	Hylton 45'	Stadium: Brunton Park; Attendance: 4,392; Referee: Mick Russell

1 November 2014 16	Portsmouth	3–0	Carlisle United	Portsmouth
15:00	Westcarr 2'; Storey 26'; Hollands 74'	Report		Stadium: Fratton Park; Attendance: 15,533; Referee: Chris Sarginson

15 November 2014 17	Carlisle United	1–0	Accrington Stanley	Carlisle
15:00	Asamoah 21'	Report		Stadium: Brunton Park; Attendance: 4,069; Referee: Tony Harrington

22 November 2014 18	Dagenham & Redbridge	4–2	Carlisle United	Dagenham (London)
15:00	Bingham 23'; Chambers 24', 46'; Cureton 39'	Report	Asamoah 16'; Grainger 53'	Stadium: Victoria Road; Attendance: 2,097; Referee: Kevin Johnson

29 November 2014 19	Carlisle United	2–3	Newport County	Carlisle
15:00	Potts 52'; Amoo 90+6'	Report	Klukowski 9'; Yakubu 47'; Jeffers 90+2'	Stadium: Brunton Park; Attendance: 3,642; Referee: Peter Bankes

13 December 2014 20	Exeter City	2–0	Carlisle United	Exeter
15:00	Bennett 58'; Grimes 89'	Report		Stadium: St James Park; Attendance: 3,402; Referee: Oliver Langford

20 December 2014 21	Carlisle United	2–1	Northampton Town	Carlisle
15:00	Archibald-Henville 17'; Potts 61'	Report	Richards 45+5' (pen.)	Stadium: Brunton Park; Attendance: 4,421; Referee: Seb Stockbridge

26 December 2014 22	Morecambe	0–1	Carlisle United	Morecambe
15:00		Report	Amoo 51'	Stadium: Globe Arena; Attendance: 4,165; Referee: Richard Clark

28 December 2014 23	Carlisle United	0–3	York City	Carlisle
15:00		Report	Carson 44'; Summerfield 68'; Coulson 81'	Stadium: Brunton Park; Attendance: 5,716; Referee: Geoff Eltringham

3 January 2015 24	Newport County	2–1	Carlisle United	Newport
15:00	Chapman 45' (pen.); Minshull 70'	Report	Meppen-Walter 11'	Stadium: Rodney Parade; Attendance: 3,273; Referee: Darren Sheldrake

10 January 2015 25	Carlisle United	0–1	Cambridge United	Carlisle
15:00		Report	Hughes 48'	Stadium: Brunton Park; Attendance: 3,406; Referee: Mark Heywood

17 January 2015 26	AFC Wimbledon	1–3	Carlisle United	London
15:00	Akinfenwa 1'	Report	O'Hanlon 16'; Rigg 56'; Amoo 90+4'	Stadium: Kingsmeadow; Attendance: 4,186; Referee: Chris Sarginson

24 January 2015 27	Bury	2–1	Carlisle United	Bury
15:00	Nardiello 16' (pen.), 62'	Report	Rigg 22'	Stadium: Gigg Lane; Attendance: 3,589; Referee: Carl Boyeson

31 January 2015 28	Carlisle United	2–1	Mansfield Town	Carlisle
15:00	Wyke 72'; Dempsey 79'	Report	Oliver 45'	Stadium: Brunton Park; Attendance: 3,827; Referee: Mark Haywood

7 February 2015 29	Tranmere Rovers	0–2	Carlisle United	Tranmere
15:00		Report	Wyke 65', 69'	Stadium: Prenton Park; Attendance: 5,358; Referee: Scott Duncan

10 February 2015 30	Carlisle United	1–2	Shrewsbury Town	Carlisle
19:45	Wyke 66'	Report	Demetriou 90+3'; Collins 90+4'	Stadium: Brunton Park; Attendance: 3,624; Referee: Eddie Ilderton

14 February 2015 31	Luton Town	1–0	Carlisle United	Luton
15:00	Cullen 36'	Report		Stadium: Kenilworth Road; Attendance: 8,502; Referee: James Linington

21 February 2015 32	Carlisle United	2–3	Wycombe Wanderers	Carlisle
15:00	Dempsey 67'; Grainger 82' (pen.)	Report	Pierre 28'; Onyedinma 62'; McClure 65'	Stadium: Brunton Park; Attendance: 4,021; Referee: Darren Handley

28 February 2015 33	Southend United	2–0	Carlisle United	Prittlewell
15:00	Timlin 50'; Corr 76'	Report		Stadium: Roots Hall; Attendance: 5,576; Referee: Trevor Kettle

3 March 2015 34	Carlisle United	1–0	Cheltenham Town	Carlisle
19:45	Wyke 31'	Report		Stadium: Brunton Park; Attendance: 3,116; Referee: Craig Pawson

7 March 2015 35	Carlisle United	1–3	Exeter City	Carlisle
15:00	Rigg 39'	Report	Harley 30', 56'; Sercombe 90+2'	Stadium: Brunton Park; Attendance: 3,724; Referee: Tony Harrington

14 March 2015 36	York City	0–0	Carlisle United	York
15:00		Report		Stadium: Bootham Crescent; Attendance: 4,274; Referee: Pat Miller

17 March 2015 37	Northampton Town	0–2	Carlisle United	Northampton
19:45		Report	Kennedy 69'; Dempsey 71'	Stadium: Sixfields Stadium; Attendance: 3,685; Referee: Tim Robinson

21 March 2015 38	Carlisle United	1–1	Morecambe	Carlisle
15:00	Potts 53'	Report	Amond 78' (pen.)	Stadium: Brunton Park; Attendance: 4,343; Referee: Peter Bankes

28 March 2015 39	Oxford United	2–1	Carlisle United	Oxford
15:00	Hoban 38'; Vassell 80'	Report	Corry 7'	Stadium: Kassam Stadium; Attendance: 5,515; Referee: Gavin Ward

3 April 2015 40	Carlisle United	2–2	Portsmouth	Carlisle
15:00	Dempsey 2'; Wyke 90+5'	Report	Wallace 38'; Tubbs 45+3'	Stadium: Brunton Park; Attendance: 5,230; Referee: Nigel Miller

6 April 2015 41	Accrington Stanley	3–1	Carlisle United	Accrington
15:00	Mingoia 25'; Windass 62'; Conneely 65'	Report	Dempsey 90+3'	Stadium: Crown Ground; Attendance: 2,274; Referee: Michael Bull

11 April 2015 42	Carlisle United	1–0	Dagenham & Redbridge	Carlisle
15:00	Kennedy 55'	Report		Stadium: Brunton Park; Attendance: 3,660; Referee: Graham Salisbury

15 April 2015 43	Burton Albion	1–1	Carlisle United	Burton-on-Trent
19:45	Johnstone 90+8'	Report	Grainger 2'	Stadium: Pirelli Stadium; Attendance: 3,892; Referee: Mark Haywood

18 April 2015 44	Carlisle United	2–0	Plymouth Argyle	Carlisle
15:00	Dicker 29'; Paynter 50'	Report		Stadium: Brunton Park; Attendance: 4,651; Referee: Geoff Eltringham

25 April 2015 45	Stevenage	1–0	Carlisle United	Stevenage
15:00	Parrett 47'	Report		Stadium: Broadhall Way; Attendance: 3,634; Referee: Darren Drysdale

2 May 2015 46	Carlisle United	3–3	Hartlepool United	Carlisle
15:00	Dempsey 25'; Rigg 31'; Kennedy 33'	Report	Hugill 63', 86'; Duckworth 64'	Stadium: Brunton Park; Attendance: 8,105; Referee: Scott Mathieson

=== FA Cup ===
8 November 2014 R1	Peterborough United	2–1	Carlisle United	Peterborough
15:00	Burgess 42', 90+1'	Report	Asamoah 8'	Stadium: London Road Stadium; Attendance: 3,168; Referee: Scott Mathieson

=== League Cup ===
The draw for the first round was made on 17 June 2014 at 10am. Carlisle United were drawn at home to Derby County.

11 August 2014 First round	Carlisle United	0–2	Derby County	Carlisle
19:45		Report	Hendrick 62'; Martin 90+3'	Stadium: Brunton Park; Attendance: 3,481; Referee: Darren Bond

=== Football League Trophy ===
2 September 2014 First round	Accrington Stanley	1–3	Carisle United	Accrington
19:45	Carver 21'	Report	Sweeney 24', 49'; Paynter 70'	Stadium: Crown Ground; Attendance: 818; Referee: Lee Collins

7 October 2014 Second round	Tranmere Rovers	1–1 (a.e.t.) (5–4 p)	Carlisle United	Tranmere
19:30	Power 40'	Report	Potts 76'	Stadium: Prenton Park; Attendance: 2,094; Referee: Richard Clark
	Penalties
	Power (penalty scored); Koumas (penalty scored); Richards (penalty scored); Ihiekwe (penalty scored); Holmes (penalty missed); Davies (penalty scored)		(penalty scored) Dicker; (penalty scored) Potts; (penalty missed) Rigg; (penalty scored) Beck; (penalty scored) Symington; (penalty missed) Brough

== Transfers ==
Players transferred in
Date	Pos.	Name	Previous club	Fee	Ref.
20 June 2014	DF	(England) Danny Grainger	(Scotland) Dunfermline Athletic	Free	
20 June 2014	MF	(England) Antony Sweeney	(England) Hartlepool United	Free	
27 June 2014	MF	(Republic of Ireland) Gary Dicker	(England) Crawley Town	Free	
27 June 2014	FW	(England) Billy Paynter	(England) Doncaster Rovers	Free	
2 July 2014	DF	(England) Troy Archibald-Henville	(England) Swindon Town	Free	
11 July 2014	MF	(Republic of Ireland) Daniel Kearns	(England) Peterborough United	Free	
14 July 2014	GK	(Wales) Dan Hanford	(Malta) Floriana	Free	
15 July 2014	MF	(England) Alex Marrow	(England) Blackburn Rovers	Free	
17 July 2014	MF	(England) Steven Rigg	(England) Penrith	Free	
7 August 2014	FW	(Republic of Ireland) Stephen Elliott	Unattached	Free	
21 October 2014	FW	(Ghana) Derek Asamoah	Unattached	Free	
15 January 2015	MF	(Montserrat) Anthony Griffith	(England) Shrewsbury Town	Free	
23 January 2015	FW	(England) Charlie Wyke	(England) Middlesbrough	Nominal fee	
2 February 2015	DF	(England) Nathan Buddle	(England) Blyth Spartans	Undisclosed	
Players loaned in
Date from	Pos.	Name	From	Date to	Ref.
19 August 2014	FW	(England) Jack Marriott	(England) Ipswich Town	20 September 2014	
18 September 2014	DF	(England) Hayden White	(England) Bolton Wanderers	Initial: 18 October 2014; Extended: 15 November 2014	
17 October 2014	FW	(Bulgaria) Georg Iliev	(England) Bolton Wanderers	15 November 2014	
29 October 2014	DF	(England) Tom Anderson	(England) Burnley	Initial: 29 November 2014; Extended: 3 January 2015	
3 November 2014	DF	(England) Connor Brown	(England) Oldham Athletic	Initial: 29 November 2014; Extended: 3 January 2015	
9 January 2015	DF	(England) Matt Young	(England) Sheffield Wednesday	Initial: 10 February 2015; Extended: 2 May 2015	
21 February 2015	GK	(Switzerland) Raphael Spiegel	(England) West Ham	21 March 2015	
12 March 2015	MF	(England) Jason Kennedy	(England) Bradford City	11 April 2015	
13 March 2015	MF	(England) Paul Corry	(England) Sheffield Wednesday	11 April 2015	
26 March 2015	MF	(England) David Atkinson	(England) Middlesbrough	2 May 2015	
26 March 2015	MF	(England) Jeffrey Monakana	(England) Brighton & Hove Albion	30 June 2015	
Players transferred out
Date	Pos.	Name	Subsequent club	Fee	Ref.
3 July 2014	MF	(Republic of Ireland) James Berrett	(England) Yeovil Town	Free	
Players loaned out
Date from	Pos.	Name	From	Date to	Ref.
15 November 2014	FW	(England) Josh Gillies	(England) FC Halifax Town	Initial: 14 December 2014; Terminated: 20 November 2014	
7 January 2015	MF	(England) Matty Robson	(England) Gateshead	30 June 2015	
13 February 2015	MF	(England) David Symington	(England) Workington	14 March 2015	
19 March 2015	MF	(England) Josh Gillies	(England) Gateshead	30 June 2015	
Players released
Date	Pos.	Name	Subsequent club	Join date	Ref.
Pre season	MF	(Ghana) Prince Buaben	(Scotland) Hearts	14 July 2014	
Pre season	DF	(England) Chris Chantler	(Scotland) Kilmarnock	9 August 2014	
Pre season	DF	(France) Pascal Chimbonda	(Greece) Oikonomos Tsaritsani	July 2014	
Pre season	DF	(England) Mike Edwards	(England) Notts County	19 August 2014	
Pre season	GK	(England) Greg Fleming	(England) Celtic Nation		
Pre season	FW	(England) Lewis Guy	(England) Gateshead	1 July 2014	
Pre season	DF	(England) Danny Livesey	(England) Barrow	1 July 2014	
Pre season	MF	(England) Jack Lynch	(England) Chorley	August 2014	
Pre season	MF	(England) Liam Noble	(England) Notts County	3 June 2014	
Pre season	FW	(Scotland) Lee Miller	(Scotland) Kilmarnock	1 July 2014	
Pre season	FW	(Spain) Nacho Novo	(United States) Carolina Railhawks	11 September 2014	
Pre season	GK	(Australia) Dean Bouzanis	(Australia) Western Sydney Wanderers	28 May 2014	
16 January 2015	DF	(England) Alex Marrow	(England) AFC Fylde	20 November 2015	

== Squad statistics ==
As of 2 May 2015

No.	Pos	Nat	Player	Total		League Two		FA Cup		League Cup		JP Trophy	
No.	Pos	Nat	Player	Apps	Goals	Apps	Goals	Apps	Goals	Apps	Goals	Apps	Goals
1	GK	(England) ENG	Mark Gillespie	21	0	19+0	0	0+0	0	1+0	0	1+0	0
2	DF	(England) ENG	Danny Grainger	43	3	41+0	3	1+0	0	0+0	0	1+0	0
3	DF	(England) ENG	Matty Robson (on loan)	13	0	5+6	0	1+0	0	1+0	0	0+0	0
4	DF	(England) ENG	Jason Kennedy (loan)	11	3	11+0	3	0+0	0	0+0	0	0+0	0
4	DF	(England) ENG	Alex Marrow (released)	5	0	4+0	0	0+0	0	0+1	0	0+0	0
5	MF	(England) ENG	Nathan Buddle	3	0	1+2	0	0+0	0	0+0	0	0+0	0
6	DF	(England) ENG	Troy Archibald-Henville	23	1	23+0	1	0+0	0	0+0	0	0+0	0
7	FW	(England) ENG	David Amoo	28	5	12+15	5	0+1	0	0+0	0	0+0	0
8	MF	(England) ENG	Antony Sweeney	31	2	25+3	1	1+0	0	1+0	0	1+0	1
9	FW	(England) ENG	Billy Paynter	20	2	9+8	1	0+0	0	1+0	0	2+0	1
10	MF	(Ireland) EIR	Gary Dicker	23	1	15+5	1	1+0	0	0+0	0	2+0	0
11	MF	(Ireland) EIR	Daniel Kearns	12	0	3+7	0	0+1	0	1+0	0	0+0	0
12	DF	(England) ENG	Paul Thirlwell	21	0	14+4	0	0+0	0	1+0	0	1+1	0
14	MF	(England) ENG	Josh Gillies (on loan)	8	1	3+3	1	0+0	0	0+0	0	2+0	0
15	DF	(England) ENG	Courtney Meppen-Walter	21	1	17+2	1	1+0	0	1+0	0	0+0	0
16	MF	(England) ENG	Brad Potts	44	8	35+5	7	1+0	0	1+0	0	1+1	1
17	MF	(Scotland) SCO	Mark Beck	28	3	10+16	3	0+1	0	0+0	0	0+1	0
18	MF	(England) ENG	Patrick Brough	32	0	27+2	0	0+0	0	0+1	0	2+0	0
19	MF	(England) ENG	David Symington (on loan)	15	0	9+3	0	0+0	0	1+0	0	2+0	0
20	GK	(Wales) WAL	Dan Hanford	27	0	25+0	0	1+0	0	0+0	0	1+0	0
21	MF	(England) ENG	Steven Rigg	29	6	19+9	6	0+0	0	0+0	0	1+0	0
22	MF	(England) ENG	Kyle Dempsey	47	11	41+2	10	1+0	0	1+0	0	1+1	1
23	DF	(England) ENG	Sean O'Hanlon	32	1	28+1	1	0+0	0	1+0	0	2+0	0
24	DF	(England) ENG	Jeffrey Monakana (loan)	1	0	1+0	0	0+0	0	0+0	0	0+0	0
24	GK	(Switzerland) SUI	Raphael Spiegel (loan completed)	2	0	2+0	0	0+0	0	0+0	0	0+0	0
25	FW	(England) ENG	Jack Marriott (loan completed)	5	0	3+1	0	0+0	0	0+0	0	0+1	0
25	FW	(Ghana) GHA	Derek Asamoah	28	5	13+14	4	1+0	1	0+0	0	0+0	0
26	FW	(England) ENG	Charlie Wyke	17	6	16+1	6	0+0	0	0+0	0	0+0	0
26	DF	(England) ENG	Hayden White (loan completed)	9	0	8+0	0	0+0	0	0+0	0	1+0	0
27	FW	(Ireland) EIR	Stephen Elliott	18	1	5+10	1	0+0	0	0+1	0	1+1	0
28	FW	(England) ENG	Connor Hammell	3	0	0+3	0	0+0	0	0+0	0	0+0	0
30	DF	(England) ENG	Matthew Douglas	0	0	0+0	0	0+0	0	0+0	0	0+0	0
31	DF	(England) ENG	Matt Young (loan)	20	0	20+0	0	0+0	0	0+0	0	0+0	0
31	FW	(Bulgaria) BUL	Georg Iliev (loan completed)	4	0	4+0	0	0+0	0	0+0	0	0+0	0
32	MF	(England) ENG	Carl Taylor	1	0	0+1	0	0+0	0	0+0	0	0+0	0
32	DF	(England) ENG	Connor Brown (loan completed)	9	0	8+0	0	1+0	0	0+0	0	0+0	0
33	GK	(England) ENG	Danny Eccles	0	0	0+0	0	0+0	0	0+0	0	0+0	0
34	MF	(Montserrat) MSR	Anthony Griffith	11	0	10+1	0	0+0	0	0+0	0	0+0	0
34	DF	(England) ENG	Tom Anderson (loan completed)	9	0	8+0	0	1+0	0	0+0	0	0+0	0
35	MF	(England) ENG	Paul Corry (loan)	6	1	5+1	1	0+0	0	0+0	0	0+0	0
36	DF	(England) ENG	David Atkinson (loan)	7	0	7+0	0	0+0	0	0+0	0	0+0	0

=== Top scorers ===
Place	Position	Nation	Number	Name	League Two	FA Cup	League Cup	JP Trophy	Total
1	FW	(England)	22	Kyle Dempsey	10	0	0	1	11
2	MF	(England)	16	Brad Potts	7	0	0	1	8
3	FW	(England)	21	Steven Rigg	6	0	0	0	6
3	FW	(England)	24	Charlie Wyke	6	0	0	0	6
5	FW	(England)	7	David Amoo	5	0	0	0	5
5	FW	(Ghana)	25	Derek Asamoah	4	1	0	0	5
7	MF	(England)	17	Mark Beck	3	0	0	0	3
7	DF	(England)	2	Danny Grainger	3	0	0	0	3
7	DF	(England)	4	Jason Kennedy	3	0	0	0	3
10	FW	(England)	9	Billy Paynter	1	0	0	1	2
10	FW	(England)	8	Antony Sweeney	1	0	0	1	2
12	DF	(England)	6	Troy Archibald-Henville	1	0	0	0	1
12	MF	(England)	35	Paul Corry	1	0	0	0	1
12	MF	(England)	10	Gary Dicker	1	0	0	0	1
12	MF	(Republic of Ireland)	27	Stephen Elliott	1	0	0	0	1
12	MF	(England)	14	Josh Gillies	1	0	0	0	1
12	DF	(England)	15	Courtney Meppen-Walter	1	0	0	0	1
12	DF	(England)	23	Sean O'Hanlon	1	0	0	0	1
				TOTALS	56	1	0	4	61

=== Disciplinary record ===
Number	Nation	Position	Name	League Two		FA Cup		League Cup		JP Trophy		Total	
Number	Nation	Position	Name	Yellow card	Red card	Yellow card	Red card	Yellow card	Red card	Yellow card	Red card	Yellow card	Red card
7	(England)	DF	Troy Archibald-Henville	6	2	0	0	0	0	0	0	6	2
22	(England)	MF	Kyle Dempsey	4	1	0	0	0	0	1	0	5	1
26	(England)	DF	Hayden White	3	1	0	0	0	0	1	0	4	1
14	(England)	DF	Alex Marrow	2	1	0	0	0	0	0	0	2	1
17	(England)	FW	Mark Beck	1	1	0	0	0	0	0	0	1	1
10	(Republic of Ireland)	MF	Gary Dicker	1	1	0	0	0	0	0	0	1	1
11	(England)	MF	Paul Thirlwell	0	1	0	0	1	0	0	0	1	1
2	(England)	DF	Danny Grainger	10	0	0	0	0	0	0	0	10	0
15	(England)	DF	Courtney Meppen-Walter	5	0	0	0	0	0	0	0	5	0
8	(England)	MF	Antony Sweeney	4	0	0	0	0	0	0	0	4	0
18	(England)	MF	Patrick Brough	2	0	0	0	0	0	1	0	3	0
23	(England)	DF	Sean O'Hanlon	3	0	0	0	0	0	0	0	3	0
21	(England)	FW	Steven Rigg	3	0	0	0	0	0	0	0	3	0
31	(England)	DF	Matt Young	3	0	0	0	0	0	0	0	3	0
4	(England)	DF	Jason Kennedy	2	0	0	0	0	0	0	0	2	0
16	(England)	DF	Brad Potts	2	0	0	0	0	0	0	0	2	0
3	(England)	DF	Matty Robson	2	0	0	0	0	0	0	0	2	0
7	(England)	FW	David Amoo	1	0	0	0	0	0	0	0	1	0
32	(England)	DF	Connor Brown	1	0	0	0	0	0	0	0	1	0
5	(England)	DF	Nathan Buddle	1	0	0	0	0	0	0	0	1	0
35	(England)	MF	Paul Corry	1	0	0	0	0	0	0	0	1	0
20	(England)	GK	Dan Hanford	1	0	0	0	0	0	0	0	1	0
19	(England)	DF	David Symington	0	0	0	0	0	0	1	0	1	0
25	(England)	FW	Charlie Wyke	1	0	0	0	0	0	0	0	1	0
			TOTALS	58	8	0	0	1	0	4	0	63	8
