= 2013–14 Carlisle United F.C. season =

Carlisle United F.C.
2013–14 season
- Chairman: Andrew Jenkins
- Manager: Greg Abbott (sacked on 9 September); Graham Kavanagh (caretaker); Davie Irons (caretaker); Tony Caig (caretaker)
- Stadium: Brunton Park
- League One: 22nd (Relegated)
- FA Cup: Third round
- Football League Cup: Second round
- Football League Trophy: Third round (North West)
- Top goalscorer: League: All: David Amoo (11)
- Highest home attendance: 29,829 – Wolverhampton Wanderers

This page shows the progress of Carlisle United F.C.'s campaign in the 2013–14 football season. In this season they competed in the third tier of English football, League One. After the completion of the season the club was relegated to League Two for the 2014–15 season.

== League data ==
=== League table ===
Pos	Team	Pld	W	D	L	GF	GA	GD	Pts	Promotion, qualification or relegation
20	Notts County	46	15	5	26	64	77	−13	50	
21	Tranmere Rovers (R)	46	12	11	23	52	79	−27	47	Relegation to Football League Two
22	Carlisle United (R)	46	11	12	23	43	76	−33	45	Relegation to Football League Two
23	Shrewsbury Town (R)	46	9	15	22	44	65	−21	42	Relegation to Football League Two
24	Stevenage (R)	46	11	9	26	46	72	−26	42	Relegation to Football League Two

Updated to match(es) played on 3 May 2014. Source: BBC Sport
Rules for classification: 1) Points; 2) Goal difference; 3) Number of goals scored
(R) Relegated

== Squad statistics ==
No.	Pos	Nat	Player	Total		League One		FA Cup		League Cup		FL Trophy	
No.	Pos	Nat	Player	Apps	Goals	Apps	Goals	Apps	Goals	Apps	Goals	Apps	Goals
1	GK	(England) ENG	Mark Gillespie	19	0	15+0	0	1+0	0	2+0	0	1+0	0
2	DF	(England) ENG	Conor Townsend (loan)	17	0	10+2	0	2+1	0	0+0	0	1+1	0
2	DF	(Republic of Ireland) IRL	Kevin Feely (loan completed)	2	0	1+1	0	0+0	0	0+0	0	0+0	0
3	DF	(England) ENG	Matty Robson	39	6	29+3	5	4+0	1	1+0	0	2+0	0
4	DF	(England) ENG	Chris Chantler	17	0	15+2	0	0+0	0	0+0	0	0+0	0
5	DF	(England) ENG	Danny Livesey (on loan)	11	0	8+1	0	0+0	0	2+0	0	0+0	0
6	FW	(Ghana) GHA	Prince Buaben (on loan)	16	1	10+2	1	3+0	0	0+0	0	1+0	0
6	DF	(England) ENG	Paul Black (loan completed)	4	0	3+0	0	0+0	0	1+0	0	0+0	0
7	MF	(England) ENG	David Amoo	50	11	38+4	8	4+0	0	2+0	3	2+0	0
8	MF	(England) ENG	Liam Noble	38	5	29+3	5	3+0	0	2+0	0	1+0	0
9	FW	(Scotland) SCO	Lee Miller	38	8	28+6	5	2+1	3	1+0	0	0+0	0
10	FW	(England) ENG	Gary Madine (loan)	5	2	5+0	2	0+0	0	0+0	0	0+0	0
10	MF	(Belgium) BEL	Charni Ekangamene (loan completed)	4	0	4+0	0	0+0	0	0+0	0	0+0	0
10	MF	(England) ENG	Craig Roddan (loan completed)	1	0	0+1	0	0+0	0	0+0	0	0+0	0
10	FW	(England) ENG	Adam Campbell (loan completed)	1	0	1+0	0	0+0	0	0+0	0	0+0	0
11	FW	(England) ENG	Danny Cadamarteri	0	0	0+0	0	0+0	0	0+0	0	0+0	0
12	MF	(England) ENG	Paul Thirlwell	33	0	27+0	0	3+0	0	2+0	0	1+0	0
14	FW	(England) ENG	Josh Gillies (on loan)	9	0	3+2	0	0+1	0	1+0	0	0+2	0
15	DF	(England) ENG	Mike Edwards	1	0	1+0	0	0+0	0	0+0	0	0+0	0
16	DF	(England) ENG	Brad Potts	44	2	32+5	2	2+1	0	2+0	0	2+0	0
17	MF	(Scotland) SCO	Mark Beck (on loan)	15	0	5+5	0	0+2	0	1+1	0	1+0	0
18	GK	(England) ENG	Jordan Pickford	19	0	19+0	0	0+0	0	0+0	0	0+0	0
18	MF	(England) ENG	Josh Todd (released)	0	0	0+0	0	0+0	0	0+0	0	0+0	0
19	MF	(England) ENG	David Symington	39	1	14+17	1	0+4	0	0+2	0	1+1	0
20	GK	(Scotland) SCO	Greg Fleming	8	0	4+0	0	3+0	0	0+0	0	1+0	0
21	MF	(Republic of Ireland) IRL	James Berrett	48	3	38+2	2	2+2	1	2+0	0	2+0	0
22	DF	(England) ENG	Nathan Eccleston (loan completed)	3	0	0+2	0	0+0	0	0+0	0	1+0	0
22	DF	(England) ENG	Reece James (loan completed)	2	0	1+0	0	0+0	0	1+0	0	0+0	0
23	DF	(England) ENG	Sean O'Hanlon	40	3	34+0	3	3+1	0	0+0	0	2+0	0
24	MF	(England) ENG	Danny Redmond	15	0	12+3	0	0+0	0	0+0	0	0+0	0
24	DF	(England) ENG	Alex Salmon (released)	1	0	0+0	0	0+0	0	0+1	0	0+0	0
25	FW	(Republic of Ireland) IRL	Sam Byrne (loan)	16	1	4+12	1	0+0	0	0+0	0	0+0	0
25	DF	(England) ENG	Brandon Gwinnutt (released)	0	0	0+0	0	0+0	0	0+0	0	0+0	0
26	MF	(England) ENG	Jack Lynch	2	0	0+1	0	0+0	0	0+0	0	0+1	0
27	MF	(England) ENG	Patrick Brough	4	0	1+2	0	0+0	0	0+1	0	0+0	0
28	DF	(England) ENG	Reece Brown	12	0	9+3	0	0+0	0	0+0	0	0+0	0
28	DF	(Germany) GER	Max Ehmer (loan completed)	15	1	12+0	1	2+0	0	0+0	0	1+0	0
28	DF	(England) ENG	Danny Butterfield (released)	2	0	1+0	0	0+0	0	1+0	0	0+0	0
29	FW	(England) ENG	Lewis Guy	31	2	12+12	1	2+1	0	1+1	1	1+1	0
30	DF	(England) ENG	Courtney Meppen-Walter	20	1	15+4	1	1+0	0	0+0	0	0+0	0
30	DF	(England) ENG	Troy Archibald-Henville (loan completed)	4	0	4+0	0	0+0	0	0+0	0	0+0	0
31	DF	(England) ENG	James Pearson	3	0	3+0	0	0+0	0	0+0	0	0+0	0
31	MF	(Republic of Ireland) IRL	Michael Drennan (loan completed)	6	0	3+3	0	0+0	0	0+0	0	0+0	0
31	MF	(Republic of Ireland) IRL	Leon McSweeney (released)	9	0	7+0	0	1+0	0	0+0	0	1+0	0
32	MF	(England) ENG	Kyle Dempsey	4	0	0+4	0	0+0	0	0+0	0	0+0	0
32	DF	(England) ENG	Josh Morris (loan completed)	6	0	1+5	0	0+0	0	0+0	0	0+0	0
33	FW	(Spain) ESP	Nacho Novo	6	0	2+4	0	0+0	0	0+0	0	0+0	0
33	FW	(Wales) WAL	Tom Lawrence (loan completed)	11	3	8+1	3	2+0	0	0+0	0	0+0	0
34	DF	(England) ENG	Lucas Dawson	1	0	1+0	0	0+0	0	0+0	0	0+0	0
39	DF	(France) FRA	Pascal Chimbonda	28	0	25+1	0	2+0	0	0+0	0	0+0	0
40	GK	(Australia) AUS	Dean Bouzanis	0	0	0+0	0	0+0	0	0+0	0	0+0	0
40	GK	(England) ENG	Ben Amos (loan completed)	9	0	9+0	0	0+0	0	0+0	0	0+0	0

=== Top scorers ===
Place	Position	Nation	Number	Name	League One	FA Cup	League Cup	JP Trophy	Total
1	FW	(England)	7	David Amoo	8	0	3	0	11
2	FW	(Scotland)	9	Lee Miller	5	3	0	0	8
3	DF	(England)	3	Matty Robson	5	1	0	0	6
4	MF	(England)	8	Liam Noble	5	0	0	0	5
5	MF	(Republic of Ireland)	21	James Berrett	2	1	1	0	4
6	FW	(Wales)	32	Tom Lawrence	3	0	0	0	3
6	DF	(England)	23	Sean O'Hanlon	3	0	0	0	3
8	DF	(England)	16	Brad Potts	2	0	0	0	2
8	FW	(England)	29	Lewis Guy	1	0	1	0	2
8	FW	(England)	10	Gary Madine	2	0	0	0	2
11	MF	(Scotland)	17	Mark Beck	0	1	0	0	1
11	MF	(Ghana)	6	Prince Buaben	1	0	0	0	1
11	FW	(Republic of Ireland)	25	Sam Byrne	1	0	0	0	1
11	DF	(Germany)	28	Max Ehmer	1	0	0	0	1
11	DF	(England)	30	Courtney Meppen-Walter	1	0	0	0	1
11	MF	(England)	19	David Symington	1	0	0	0	1
				TOTALS	41	6	5	0	52

=== Disciplinary record ===
Number	Nation	Position	Name	League One		FA Cup		League Cup		JP Trophy		Total	
Number	Nation	Position	Name	Booked	Sent off (straight red)	Booked	Sent off (straight red)	Booked	Sent off (straight red)	Booked	Sent off (straight red)	Booked	Sent off (straight red)
9	(Scotland)	FW	Lee Miller	3	2	0	0	0	0	0	0	3	2
21	(Republic of Ireland)	MF	James Berrett	7	1	0	0	0	0	1	0	8	1
30	(England)	DF	Courtney Meppen-Walter	4	1	0	0	0	0	0	0	4	1
2	(England)	DF	Conor Townsend	4	1	0	0	0	0	0	0	4	1
8	(England)	MF	Liam Noble	7	0	2	0	0	0	0	0	9	0
39	(France)	DF	Pascal Chimbonda	6	0	0	0	0	0	0	0	6	0
16	(England)	DF	Brad Potts	5	0	1	0	0	0	0	0	6	0
23	(England)	DF	Sean O'Hanlon	3	0	1	0	0	0	1	0	5	0
4	(England)	DF	Chris Chantler	4	0	0	0	0	0	0	0	4	0
3	(England)	DF	Matty Robson	4	0	0	0	0	0	0	0	4	0
28	(Germany)	DF	Max Ehmer	3	0	0	0	0	0	0	0	3	0
11	(England)	MF	Paul Thirlwell	2	0	1	0	0	0	0	0	3	0
7	(England)	FW	David Amoo	2	0	0	0	0	0	0	0	2	0
5	(England)	DF	Danny Livesey	2	0	0	0	0	0	0	0	2	0
16	(England)	GK	Jordan Pickford	2	0	0	0	0	0	0	0	2	0
19	(England)	MF	David Symington	2	0	0	0	0	0	0	0	2	0
30	(England)	DF	Troy Archibald-Henville	1	0	0	0	0	0	0	0	1	0
17	(Scotland)	FW	Mark Beck	1	0	0	0	0	0	0	0	1	0
6	(England)	DF	Paul Black	1	0	0	0	0	0	0	0	1	0
6	(Ghana)	FW	Prince Buaben	1	0	0	0	0	0	0	0	1	0
25	(Republic of Ireland)	FW	Sam Byrne	1	0	0	0	0	0	0	0	1	0
2	(Republic of Ireland)	DF	Kevin Feely	1	0	0	0	0	0	0	0	1	0
29	(England)	FW	Lewis Guy	1	0	0	0	0	0	0	0	1	0
32	(Wales)	FW	Tom Lawrence	1	0	0	0	0	0	0	0	1	0
33	(Spain)	FW	Nacho Novo	1	0	0	0	0	0	0	0	1	0
24	(England)	MF	Danny Redmond	1	0	0	0	0	0	0	0	1	0
			TOTALS	67	5	5	0	0	0	2	0	74	5

== Results ==
The pre-season friendlies for the club were announced 10 June 2013.

=== Pre-season friendlies ===
5 July 2013	Penrith	0–1	Carlisle United	Penrith
19:00		Report	Salmon 68'	Stadium: The World Group Stadium

6 July 2013	Kendal Town	1–4	Carlisle United	Kendal
15:00	McGeechan 35'	Report	Beck 68'; Salmon 75'; Deacey 82'; Guy 90'	Stadium: Cosyseal Stadium; Attendance: 405

9 July 2013	Workington	1–1	Carlisle United	Workington
19:45	Hewson 9' (pen.)	Report	Miller 11' (pen.)	Stadium: Borough Park; Attendance: 541

16 July 2013	Garforth Town	0–6	Carlisle United	Garforth
19:30		Report	Miller 8'; Edwards 42'; Emerton 59'; Beck 73', 85', 89'	Stadium: Genix Healthcare Stadium; Attendance: 216

19 July 2013	Annan Athletic	2–1	Carlisle United	Annan
19:30	Mackay 7', 11'	Report	Edwards 25'	Stadium: Galabank

20 July 2013	Carlisle United	1–4	Burnley	Carlisle
15:00	Guy 59'	Report	Wallace 7'; Ings 10', 22'; Stanislas 57'	Stadium: Brunton Park; Attendance: 1,976

23 July 2013	Carlisle United	1–0	Bolton Wanderers	Carlisle
19:45	Miller 13'	Report		Stadium: Brunton Park; Attendance: 1,691 (251 away fans)

26 July 2013	Kilmarnock	2–2	Carlisle United	Kilmarnock
19:45	Heffernan 3', 89'	Report	Beck 16', 53'	Stadium: Rugby Park; Attendance: 1,342

27 July 2013	Rangers	2–3	Carlisle United	Milngavie, Glasgow
15:00	?? 13' ?? 85'	Report	Dempsey 50', 86'; Guy 52'	Stadium: Rangers Training Centre

=== League One ===
3 August 2013 1	Carlisle United	1–5	Leyton Orient	Carlisle
15:00	Amoo 43' (pen.)	Report	Lisbie 22'; Cuthbert 37'; Cox 81', 85'; Mooney 70'	Stadium: Brunton Park; Attendance: 4,951; Referee: Jeremy Simpson

10 August 2013 2	Bradford City	4–0	Carlisle United	Bradford
15:00	Yeates 20'; Wells 25'; Hanson 29'; Jones 67'	Report		Stadium: Valley Parade; Attendance: 13,641; Referee: Oliver Langford

17 August 2013 3	Carlisle United	0–4	Coventry City	Carlisle
15:00		Report	L. Clarke 4', 65'; Moussa 6'; Daniels 31'	Stadium: Brunton Park; Attendance: 4,072; Referee: Paul Tierney

23 August 2013 4	Colchester United	1–1	Carlisle United	Colchester
19:45	Sears 71'	(Report)	Robson 4'	Stadium: Colchester Community Stadium; Attendance: 3,573; Referee: Gavin Ward

31 August 2013 5	Brentford	0–0	Carlisle United	Brentford, London
15:00		Report		Stadium: Griffin Park; Attendance: 6,035; Referee: David Phillips

7 September 2013 6	Carlisle United	0–1	Port Vale	Carlisle
15:00		Report	Pope 90+2'	Stadium: Brunton Park; Attendance: 3,866; Referee: Mark Brown

14 September 2013 7	Carlisle United	1–0	Sheffield United	Carlisle
15:00	Robson 54'	Report		Stadium: Brunton Park; Attendance: 4,863; Referee: Darren Bond

21 September 2013 8	Stevenage	1–3	Carlisle United	Stevenage
15:00	Tansey 59'	Report	Miller 27'; Robson 77'; Amoo 85'	Stadium: Broadhall Way; Attendance: 2,526; Referee: Andy Davies

28 September 2013 9	Carlisle United	2–1	Notts County	Carlisle
15:00	Robson 41'; Amoo 54'	Report	McGregor 27'	Stadium: Brunton Park; Attendance: 4,315; Referee: Eddie Ilderton

5 October 2013 10	Shrewsbury Town	2–2	Carlisle United	Shrewsbury
15:00 (GMT)	Bradshaw 40'; Parry 90'	Report	Amoo 87'; O'Hanlon 90'	Stadium: New Meadow; Attendance: 5,215; Referee: Andy Madley

19 October 2013 11	Oldham Athletic	1–0	Carlisle United	Oldham
15:00	Rooney 27' (pen.)	Report		Stadium: Boundary Park; Attendance: 4,478; Referee: Mark Heywood

22 October 2013 12	Milton Keynes Dons	0–1	Carlisle United	Milton Keynes
19:45		Report	Guy 35'	Stadium: Stadium MK; Attendance: 6,675; Referee: Andy D'Urso

26 October 2013 13	Carlisle United	2–4	Bristol City	Carlisle
15:00 BST	O'Hanlon 24'; Noble 80'	Report	Emmanuel-Thomas 51', 52', 84'; Wagstaff 72'	Stadium: Brunton Park; Attendance: 4,672; Referee: Scott Duncan

2 November 2013 14	Gillingham	1–0	Carlisle United	Gillingham
15:00 BST	Kedwell 63' (pen.)	Report		Stadium: Priestfield Stadium; Attendance: 5,697; Referee: Charles Breakspear

5 November 2013 15	Carlisle United	2–2	Wolverhampton Wanderers	Carlisle
19:45 GMT	Buaben 30'; Noble 54' (pen.)	Report	Sako 8'; Griffiths 42'	Stadium: Brunton Park; Attendance: 5,369; Referee: Scott Mathieson

16 November 2013 16	Carlisle United	1–1	Crawley Town	Carlisle
15:00	Noble 47' (pen.)	Report	Clarke 88'	Stadium: Brunton Park; Attendance: 3,675; Referee: Tony Harrington

23 November 2013 17	Rotherham	0–0	Carlisle United	Rotherham
15:00		Report		Stadium: New York Stadium; Attendance: 7,520; Referee: Mark Brown

26 November 2013 18	Carlisle United	2–1	Crewe Alexandra	Carlisle
19:45	Symington 45'; Robson 45+2'	Report	Davis 90+4'	Stadium: Brunton Park; Attendance: 2,969; Referee: Andy Haines

30 November 2013 19	Swindon Town	3–1	Carlisle United	Swindon
15:00	Luongo 36'; Pritchard 72'; N'Guessan 90+3'	Report	O'Hanlon 69'	Stadium: County Ground; Attendance: 7,671; Referee: Steve Bratt

14 December 2013 20	Carlisle United	4–1	Tranmere Rovers	Carlisle
15:00	Lawrence 1', 67'; Amoo 52'; Berrett 76'	Report	Lowe 81'	Stadium: Brunton Park; Attendance: 3,793; Referee: Andy Madley

21 December 2013 21	Walsall	2–0	Carlisle United	Walsall
15:00	Sawyers 15'; Lalkovic 66'	Report		Stadium: Bescot Stadium; Attendance: 4,062; Referee: Darren Bond

26 December 2013 22	Carlisle United	0–1	Preston North End	Carlisle
14:00		Report	Brownhill 42'	Stadium: Brunton Park; Attendance: 7,934; Referee: Eddie Ilderton

29 December 2013 23	Carlisle United	2–1	Peterborough United	Carlisle
15:00	Amoo 72', 73'	Report	Tomlin 61'	Stadium: Brunton Park; Attendance: 3,904; Referee: Seb Stockbridge

1 January 2014 24	Crewe Alexandra	2–1	Carlisle United	Crewe
15:00	Aneke 53'; Mesca 64'	Report	Lawrence 78'	Stadium: Alexandra Stadium; Attendance: 4,458; Referee: Darren Drysdale

11 January 2014 25	Leyton Orient	4–0	Carlisle United	Leyton
15:00	Cuthbert 43'; Ness 47'; Lisbie 66'; Coulthirst 90+5'	Report		Stadium: Brisbane Road; Attendance: 5,279; Referee: Graham Horwood

18 January 2014 26	Carlisle United	2–4	Colchester United	Carlisle
15:00	Okuonghae 19' (o.g.); Ehmer 90+1'	Report	Watt 16', 45+2'; Bean 68'; Ehmer 75' (o.g.); Eastman 80'	Stadium: Brunton Park; Attendance: 3,688; Referee: Chris Sarginson

28 January 2014 27	Carlisle United	3–0	Milton Keynes Dons	Carlisle
19:45	Miller 38'; Potts 43'; Amoo 59'	Report		Stadium: Brunton Park; Attendance: 3,007; Referee: David Coote

1 February 2014 28	Bristol City	2–1	Carlisle United	Bristol
15:00	Elliott 68', 70'	Report	Potts 43'	Stadium: Ashton Gate; Attendance: 11,029; Referee: Trevor Kettle

8 February 2014 29	Carlisle United	1–2	Gillingham	Carlisle
15:00	Legge 90' (o.g.)	Report	Pigott 44'; McDonald 88'	Stadium: Brunton Park; Attendance: 3,584; Referee: Mark Heywood

11 February 2014 30	Carlisle United	1–0	Bradford City	Carlisle
19:45	Miller 14'	Report		Stadium: Brunton Park; Attendance: 3,267; Referee: Geoff Eltringham

15 February 2014 31	Crawley Town	ppd.	Carlisle United	Crawley
15:00		Report		Stadium: Broadfield Stadium

19 February 2014 31	Coventry City	1–2	Carlisle United	Northampton
19:45	Moussa 32'	Report	Noble 55'; Byrne 70'	Stadium: Sixfields Stadium; Attendance: 1,603; Referee: Steve Bratt

22 February 2014 32	Carlisle United	1–2	Rotherham	Carlisle
15:00	Miller 45+3'	Report	Thomas 24'; Agard 90+2'	Stadium: Brunton Park; Attendance: 4,293; Referee: Steve Martin

1 March 2014 33	Carlisle United	0–0	Brentford	Carlisle
15:00		Report		Stadium: Brunton Park; Attendance: 3,984; Referee: Michael Naylor

8 March 2014 34	Port Vale	2–1	Carlisle United	Burslem
15:00	Meppen-Walter 39'	Report	Williamson 56'; Pope 61'	Stadium: Vale Park; Attendance: 5,009; Referee: Scott Duncan

12 March 2014 35	Sheffield United	1–0	Carlisle United	Sheffield
19:45	Baxter 28'	Report		Stadium: Bramall Lane; Attendance: 15,437; Referee: Carl Boyeson

15 March 2014 36	Carlisle United	0–0	Stevenage	Carlisle
15:00		Report		Stadium: Brunton Park; Attendance: 3,672; Referee: James Adcock

22 March 2013 37	Notts County	4–1	Carlisle United	Nottingham
15:00	Hollis 33', 47'; Murray 40'; Liddle 70'	Report	Berrett 40'	Stadium: Meadow Lane; Attendance: 4,045; Referee: Graham Scott

25 March 2013 38	Carlisle United	0–0	Shrewsbury Town	Carlisle
19:45 (GMT)		Report		Stadium: Brunton Park; Attendance: 3,963; Referee: Steven Rushton

29 March 2013 39	Tranmere Rovers	0–0	Carlisle United	Birkenhead
15:00		Report		Stadium: Prenton Park; Attendance: 5,215; Referee: Stuart Attwell

5 April 2013 40	Carlisle United	1–0	Swindon Town	Carlisle
15:00	Madine 38'	Report		Stadium: Brunton Park; Attendance: 4,055; Referee: Nigel Miller

12 April 2013 41	Preston North End	6–1	Carlisle United	Preston
15:00	Beavon 10'; Browne 20'; C. Davies 57', 79', 83'	Report	Madine 41'	Stadium: Deepdale; Attendance: 11,428; Referee: Mark Haywood

18 April 2014 42	Carlisle United	1–1	Walsall	Carlisle
15:00	Noble 13'	Report	Ngoo 82'	Stadium: Brunton Park; Attendance: 4,389; Referee: Darren Drysdale

21 April 2014 43	Peterborough United	4–1	Carlisle United	Peterborough
15:00	Washington 14'; Assombalonga 55' (pen.), 73' (pen.); Bostwick 90'	Report	Miller 63'	Stadium: London Road Stadium; Attendance: 5,921; Referee: David Phillips

26 April 2014 44	Carlisle United	0–1	Oldham Athletic	Carlisle
15:00		Report	Dayton 70'	Stadium: Brunton Park; Attendance: 5,313; Referee: Paul Tierney

29 April 2014 45	Crawley Town	0–0	Carlisle United	Crawley
19:45		Report		Stadium: Broadfield Stadium; Attendance: 3,271; Referee: Robert Lewis

3 May 2014 46	Wolverhampton Wanderers	3–0	Carlisle United	Wolverhampton
19:45	Ricketts 5'; Jacobs 24'; Dicko 57'	Report		Stadium: Molineux; Attendance: 29,829; Referee: Andy D'Urso

Carlisle United relegated to League Two for the 2014–15 season

=== FA Cup ===
9 November 2013 Round 1	Boreham Wood	0–0	Carlisle United	Borehamwood
14:00		Report		Stadium: Meadow Park; Referee: Brendon Malone

19 November 2013 Round 1 replay	Carlisle United	2–1	Boreham Wood	Carlisle
19:45	Miller 80'; Beck 90+5'	Report	Garrard 29' (pen.)	Stadium: Brunton Park; Attendance: 1,484; Referee: Mark Haywood

7 December 2013 Round 2	Carlisle United	3–2	Brentford	Carlisle
15:00	Berrett 45+1'; Miller 73', 77' (pen.)	Report	Chimbonda 63' (o.g.); El Alagui 86'	Stadium: Brunton Park; Attendance: 2,581; Referee: Andy Woolmer

5 January 2014 Round 3	Sunderland	3–1	Carlisle United	Sunderland
14:00	Johnson 34'; O'Hanlon 50' (o.g.); Ba 90'	Report	Robson 43'	Stadium: Stadium of Light; Attendance: 21,973; Referee: Neil Swarbrick

=== Football League Cup ===
7 August 2013 Round 1	Carlisle United	3–3 (a.e.t.) (4–3 p)	Blackburn Rovers	Carlisle
19:45	Amoo 14', 114'; Guy 62'	Report	Cairney 52'; Taylor 56'; Judge 95'	Stadium: Brunton Park; Attendance: 4,372; Referee: Richard Clark
	Penalties
	Salmon (penalty missed); Beck (penalty scored); Berrett (penalty scored); Noble (penalty scored); Symington (penalty scored)		(penalty scored) Judge; (penalty scored) Lowe; (penalty scored) Rhodes; (penalty missed) Taylor; (penalty missed) Morris

27 August 2013 Round 2	Carlisle United	2–5	Leicester City	Carlisle
19:45 BST	Amoo 16'; Berrett 71'	Report	Wood 38' 59' (pen.) 63'; Dyer 47'; Knockaert 51'	Stadium: Brunton Park; Attendance: 3,308; Referee: Graham Salisbury

=== Football League Trophy ===
8 October 2013 Round 2	Morecambe	0–0 (a.e.t.) (4–3 p)	Carlisle United	Morecambe
19:45		Report		Stadium: Globe Arena; Attendance: 2,297
	Penalties
	Robson (penalty scored); O'Hanlon (penalty scored); Berrett (penalty scored); Noble (penalty scored)		(penalty scored) Amond; (penalty scored) Wright; (penalty missed) Williams; (penalty missed) Fleming

12 November 2013 Round 3	Fleetwood Town	2–0	Carlisle United	Fleetwood
19:45	Ball 5'; Sarcevic 54'	Report		Stadium: Highbury Stadium; Attendance: 2,446; Referee: Stuart Attwell

== Transfers ==
Players transferred in
Date	Pos.	Name	Previous club	Fee	Ref.
15 June 2013	FW	(England) David Amoo	(England) Tranmere Rovers	Free agent	
24 July 2013	FW	(England) Lewis Guy	(Scotland) St Mirren	Free agent	
1 August 2013	GK	(Scotland) Greg Fleming	(England) Grimsby Town	Free agent	
23 August 2013	DF	(England) Danny Butterfield	(England) Southampton	Free agent	
3 September 2013	DF	(Republic of Ireland) Leon McSweeney	(England) Leyton Orient	Free agent	
18 October 2013	DF	(France) Pascal Chimbonda	(Wales) Colwyn Bay	Free agent (3 month contract); Extended until end of season	
22 October 2013	MF	(Ghana) Prince Buaben	(Scotland) Dundee United	Free agent	
28 November 2013	DF	(England) Courtney Meppen-Walter	(England) Manchester City	Free agent	
27 January 2014	GK	(Australia) Dean Bouzanis	(Greece) Aris	Free agent	
12 February 2014	FW	(Spain) Nacho Novo	(Scotland) Greenock Morton	Free agent	
Players loaned in
Date from	Pos.	Name	From	Date to	Ref.
15 July 2013	FW	(England) Reece James	(England) Manchester United	Initial: 1 January 2014; Terminated: 24 September 2013	
8 August 2013	DF	(Republic of Ireland) Kevin Feely	(England) Charlton Athletic	5 September 2013	
8 August 2013	DF	(England) Paul Black	(England) Mansfield Town	5 September 2013	
15 August 2013	ST	(England) Adam Campbell	(England) Newcastle United	31 August 2013	
First Loan: 2 September 2013	DF	(England) Conor Townsend	(England) Hull City	Initial: 5 October 2013; Extended: 3 December 2013	
2 September 2013	DF	(England) Troy Archibald-Henville	(England) Swindon Town	1 October 2013	
4 October 2013	DF	(England) Nathan Eccleston	(England) Blackpool	4 November 2013	
4 November 2013	DF	(Germany) Max Ehmer	(England) QPR	Initial: 1 December 2013; Extension #1: 2 January 2014; Extension #2: 28 January 2014	
15 November 2013	GK	(England) Ben Amos	(England) Manchester United	Initial: 15 December 2013; Extended: 1 January 2014	
28 November 2013	MF	(England) Craig Roddan	(England) Liverpool	1 January 2014	
28 November 2013	DF	(England) Josh Morris	(England) Blackburn Rovers	4 January 2014	
28 November 2013	FW	(Wales) Tom Lawrence	(England) Manchester United	Initial: 4 January 2014; Extension: 28 January 2014	
Second Loan: 3 January 2014	DF	(England) Conor Townsend	(England) Hull City	End of season	
17 January 2014	FW	(Republic of Ireland) Michael Drennan	(England) Aston Villa	18 February 2014	
31 January 2014	MF	(Belgium) Charni Ekangamene	(England) Manchester United	Initial: End of season Terminated: 27 March 2014	
31 January 2014	MF	(Republic of Ireland) Sam Byrne	(England) Manchester United	End of season	
8 February 2014	GK	(England) Jordan Pickford	(England) Sunderland	Initial: 8 March 2014; Extended: End of Season	
8 February 2014	MF	(England) Danny Redmond	(England) Wigan Athletic	Initial: 8 March 2014; Extended: 8 April 2014	
11 March 2014	DF	(England) Reece Brown	(England) Watford	11 April 2014	
11 March 2014	DF	(England) James Pearson	(England) Leicester City	End of Season	
28 March 2014	FW	(England) Gary Madine	(England) Sheffield Wednesday	End of season	
28 March 2014	DF	(England) Lucas Dawson	(England) Stoke City	End of season	
Players loaned out
Date from	Pos.	Name	To	Date to	Ref.
21 August 2013	FW	(England) Josh Todd	(Scotland) Annan Athletic	30 January 2014	
24 August 2013	FW	(England) Alex Salmon	(Scotland) Alloa Athletic	17 December 2014	
30 January 2014	DF	(Scotland) Mark Beck	(Scotland) Falkirk	End of season	
31 January 2014	MF	(Ghana) Prince Buaben	(Scotland) Partick Thistle	End of season	
31 January 2014	DF	(England) Danny Livesey	(Wales) Wrexham	End of season	
Players released
Date	Pos.	Name	Subsequent club	Join date	Ref.
End of Season	MF	(England) Andy Welsh	(England) Scunthorpe	24 June 2013	
End of Season	DF	(Republic of Ireland) Peter Murphy	(England) Celtic Nation	August 2013	
End of Season	FW	(England) Rory Loy	(Scotland) Falkirk	31 July 2013	
End of Season	DF	(United States) Frankie Simek			
End of Season	FW	(France) Mathieu Manset	(England) Coventry City	7 August 2013	
End of Season	MF	(Scotland) Jon-Paul McGovern			
End of Season	GK	(England) Adam Collin	(England) Rotherham United	23 May 2013	
2 September 2013	DF	(England) Danny Butterfield	(England) Exeter City	21 September 2013	
4 January 2014	DF	(Republic of Ireland) Leon McSweeney	(England) Northampton Town	30 January 2014	
26 January 2014	DF	(England) Alex Salmon			
26 January 2014	DF	(England) Brandon Gwinnutt			
30 January 2014	FW	(England) Josh Todd	(Scotland) Annan Athletic	30 January 2014	
