= Kyle Dempsey =

English footballer (born 1995)

Personal information
- Full name: Kyle Michael Dempsey
- Date of birth: 17 September 1995 (age 31)
- Place of birth: Whitehaven, Cumbria, England
- Height: 5 ft 10 in (1.78 m)
- Position: Midfielder

Team information
- Current team: Port Vale
- Number: 10

Youth career
- 2003–2014: Carlisle United

Senior career*
Years	Team	Apps	(Gls)
2014–2015	Carlisle United	47	(10)
2015–2017	Huddersfield Town	21	(1)
2016–2017	→ Fleetwood Town (loan)	38	(2)
2017–2020	Fleetwood Town	80	(3)
2019	→ Peterborough United (loan)	11	(0)
2020–2022	Gillingham	61	(9)
2022–2026	Bolton Wanderers	135	(14)
2026–	Port Vale	13	(2)
- * Club domestic league appearances and goals as of 08:47, 15 November 2026 (UTC)

Kyle Michael Dempsey (born 17 September 1995) is an English professional footballer who plays as a midfielder for EFL League Two club Port Vale. He describes himself as a "goal-scoring midfielder" and has averaged a goal every ten games throughout his career.

Dempsey came from a sporting family as his father was a professional rugby league player. He grew up in Cumbria and joined local club Carlisle United, making his first-team debut in January 2014 and going on to win the club's Player of the Year award for the 2014–15 season. Carlisle sold him to Huddersfield Town in July 2015, where he would play 21 games at Championship level. He spent the 2016–17 season on loan at Fleetwood Town, joining the club permanently for a £300,000 fee in May 2017. He played a total of 146 games for the club and also featured 11 times on loan at Peterborough United in the second half of the 2018–19 season. He signed for Gillingham in August 2020 and went on to be named as club captain and Player of the Year for the 2020–21 campaign. He was sold to Bolton Wanderers for a fee of around £150,000 in January 2022. He won the EFL Trophy with Bolton in 2023 and was an unused substitute in the 2026 play-off final that secured promotion out of League One. He signed for Port Vale in July 2026.

== Early and personal life ==
Kyle Michael Dempsey was born on 17 September 1995 in Whitehaven, Cumbria. His father, Michael Dempsey, played rugby league professionally for Workington Town and he nearly followed his father into the sport, having played for youth sides at Wigan Warriors before electing to pursue a career in professional football. He had also been capped by England at under-16 level. On 1 March 2023, at Carlisle Crown Court, Dempsey and his father both admitted assaulting a Maryport doorman on 16 July 2022. He received a 12-month suspended sentence, suspended for 18 months, 200 hours of unpaid work, £1,750 in compensation, and a 9pm–7am curfew enforced by an electronic tag. He was permitted to break the curfew to fulfil his professional football commitments.

== Career ==
=== Carlisle United ===
Dempsey made his first-team debut for Carlisle United on 28 January 2014 in a 3–0 win over Milton Keynes Dons, coming on a substitute for David Amoo. He played three further League One games in the 2013–14 campaign, which culminated in relegation, costing manager Graham Kavanagh his job. Dempsey turned professional in April 2014, saying "it genuinely does feel like my hard work has paid off". Academy manager Alan Moore said that "the real hard work starts now".

He made his first career start in a 2–0 defeat to Derby County at Brunton Park in the EFL Cup on 11 August 2014, being named as Carlisle's man of the match. On 6 September, he scored twice on his full home league debut against AFC Wimbledon. He scored 11 goals and provided 10 assists during the 2014–15 season. He was named as Carlisle's Player of the Year, helping the team to avoid relegation from League Two and being entrusted with the captaincy despite his teenage years by manager Keith Curle. He was the youngest player to wear the captain's armband for the club. He signed a new 18-month deal in February. Dempsey had a buyout clause in his contract and was strongly linked to both Barnsley and Milton Keynes Dons, among others.

=== Huddersfield Town ===
Dempsey signed a three-year contract with Championship club Huddersfield Town on 10 July 2015 for an undisclosed fee. The fee was reported to be £300,000. Manager Chris Powell said that he was not a replacement to recently departed midfielder Conor Coady and that the Terriers would give him "the platform to keep improving". His first league start came in their 2–2 draw against Reading at the Madejski Stadium on 3 November. His first goal for the club came in a 4–2 defeat to Brentford at Griffin Park on 19 December. He made ten Championship starts in the 2015–16 campaign, featuring 24 times in total, before he fell down the pecking order at the Kirklees Stadium behind Aaron Mooy, Ivan Paurević, Jonathan Hogg, Dean Whitehead and Philip Billing.

=== Fleetwood Town ===
On 29 August 2016, with his chances limited at Huddersfield under new manager David Wagner, Dempsey joined League One club Fleetwood Town on a season-long loan. Head coach Uwe Rösler said that "he has the right mentality for what we are trying to achieve here". Dempsey was named as the Fleetwood Town fans Player of the Month for February. He won the club's Young Player of the Season award after making 46 appearances in 2016–17. He signed for Fleetwood permanently on a three-year contract on 19 May 2017.

Speaking in March 2018, new manager John Sheridan said that Dempsey should be more attacking and "scoring seven or eight goals a season from midfield". He ended the 2017–18 season with one goal on 51 games. He lost his first-team place in the first half of the 2018–19 campaign, making just five starts for the club and taking him to a "dark place" mentally. On 7 January, Dempsey joined fellow League One club Peterborough United on loan until the end of the 2018–19 season. He started under manager Steve Evans, though he was dropped by his successor, Darren Ferguson. He was in and out of the team at London Road, starting six games and playing five times as a substitute for the Posh.

He returned to form for the Cod Army early in the 2019–20 season after recovering from a quad injury sustained during pre-season, building a midfield partnership with Paul Coutts and Jordan Rossiter. Manager Joey Barton claimed that Dempsey could be the best player in League One. He sustained a back injury in February, though he returned to play in the play-off semi-finals defeat to Wycombe Wanderers. He was released at the end of the campaign, having rejected a three-year deal offered to him in January. He had played 146 games in his four seasons at Highbury Stadium.

=== Gillingham ===
On 17 August 2020, Dempsey joined League One club Gillingham. He was named club captain the following month. Dempsey attracted interest and an offer in the January 2021 transfer window, but Gillingham turned the offer down and Dempsey remained at the club. He was named as Gillingham's Player of the Year for the 2020–21 season, scoring eight goals and providing five assists to help the Gills to a top-ten finish. Charlton Athletic had a bid of £100,000 for Dempsey rejected in August 2021 as "insulting nonsense". At the time of Dempsey's departure from Priestfield, the Gills were 23rd in the table, 10 points from safety, under the caretakership of Steve Lovell.

=== Bolton Wanderers ===
Dempsey joined League One club Bolton Wanderers on 31 January 2022 for a fee reported to be around £150,000. He signed a two-and-a-half year deal. He struggled with injuries in the second half of the 2021–22 season. Having had a "stop-start" first half-season with the Wanderers, he scored his first two goals for Bolton on 6 August in a 3–0 win over Wycombe. He scored six goals and provided three assists in his 47 appearances during the 2022–23 campaign, helping the Whites to secure a play-off place. He was named as Bolton's Player of the Month for January and February. On 2 April, he started in the 2023 EFL Trophy final, scoring the opening goal in a 4–0 victory over Plymouth Argyle at Wembley Stadium. Manager Ian Evatt defended Dempsey following his assault conviction, saying "he understands what happened was completely wrong". In June 2023, he signed a two-year extension at Bolton, extending his contract until 2026.

He was named on the EFL Team of the Week after scoring a goal, winning three aerial duels and making three key passes in a 4–1 win at former club Carlisle on 27 January 2024. Three days later, he was named as EFL Trophy Player of the Round for his performance in the club's 3–1 victory at Accrington Stanley in the Round of 16. He played in the 2024 League One play-off final defeat to Oxford United. This took his appearance tally to 51 for the 2023–24 season.

He lost his first-team place to loanee Jay Matete during the 2024–25 season. He scored four goals and provided two assists in 19 appearances, with six of his appearances coming in September, when he was named as the club's Player of the Month. He scored one and assisted another goal in a 2–2 draw at Shrewsbury Town on 5 October, being named on the EFL Team of the Week and as one of the top five performers in League One that weekend. He underwent surgery in the summer of 2025 to correct a long-standing knee injury that had plagued him throughout his time at the Toughsheet Community Stadium and kept him sidelined for much of the second half of the 2024–25 campaign. He took a gradual approach to returning to full fitness so as not to aggravate the injury.

Speaking in February 2026, manager Steven Schumacher praised Dempsey's versatility in midfield, having previously said he was "a really good example to the other people in the squad". He featured 33 times in the 2025–26 campaign, scoring three goals. He was an unused substitute in the play-off final victory over Stockport County. He was released at the end of his contract, ending his four-and-a-half year stay with the Totters on 17 goals in 161 appearances, with 16 assists.

=== Port Vale ===
On 1 July 2026, Dempsey signed a two-year contract with League Two club Port Vale. Manager Jon Brady said that "he has the qualities we're looking to build our team around", naming him as vice-captain. He scored his first goal for the Valiants with a free kick in a 1–0 win over Grimsby Town at Vale Park on 10 October, earning himself a place on the EFL Team of the Week having also made two key passes, won six duels and made three shots in total.

== Style of play ==
Dempsey has been utilised as a "deeper-lying number eight to a number 10 behind the front two", describing himself as a "goal-scoring midfielder" who "likes to receive the ball around the halfway line and drive with the ball and bring everyone else into play". He is also capable of playing on the wings if required. He has leadership qualities, having captained clubs since his teenage years. At Carlisle, he had been described as "one of the most determined young footballers you could wish to find".

== Career statistics ==
As of match played 14 November 2026

Appearances and goals by club, season and competition
Club	Season	League			FA Cup		EFL Cup		Other		Total	
Club	Season	Division	Apps	Goals	Apps	Goals	Apps	Goals	Apps	Goals	Apps	Goals
Carlisle United	2013–14	League One	4	0	0	0	0	0	0	0	4	0
Carlisle United	2014–15	League Two	43	10	1	0	1	0	2 (Note: Appearances in EFL Trophy)	1	47	11
Carlisle United	Total		47	10	1	0	1	0	2	1	51	11
Huddersfield Town	2015–16	Championship	21	1	2	0	1	0	—		24	1
Huddersfield Town	2016–17	Championship	0	0	—		0	0	—		0	0
Huddersfield Town	Total		21	1	2	0	1	0	—		24	1
Fleetwood Town (loan)	2016–17	League One	38	2	5	0	—		3 (Note: One appearance in EFL Trophy, two in League One play-offs)	0	46	2
Fleetwood Town	2017–18	League One	45	1	4	0	1	0	1	0	51	1
Fleetwood Town	2018–19	League One	14	0	1	0	1	0	5	1	21	1
Fleetwood Town	2019–20	League One	21	2	3	0	0	0	4 (Note: Two appearances in EFL Trophy, two appearances in League One play-offs)	0	28	2
Fleetwood Town	Total		118	5	13	0	2	0	13	1	146	6
Peterborough United (loan)	2018–19	League One	11	0	—		—		—		11	0
Gillingham	2020–21	League One	40	8	2	0	1	0	1	0	44	8
Gillingham	2021–22	League One	21	1	1	0	0	0	0	0	22	1
Gillingham	Total		61	9	3	0	1	0	1	0	66	9
Bolton Wanderers	2021–22	League One	11	0	—		—		—		11	0
Bolton Wanderers	2022–23	League One	39	5	1	0	1	0	6 (Note: Four appearances in the EFL Trophy, two appearances in the League One play-offs)	1	47	6
Bolton Wanderers	2023–24	League One	41	3	2	0	2	0	6 (Note: Three appearances in EFL Trophy, three appearances in League One play-offs)	1	51	4
Bolton Wanderers	2024–25	League One	15	3	0	0	2	0	2	1	19	4
Bolton Wanderers	2025–26	League One	29	3	1	0	0	0	3	0	33	3
Bolton Wanderers	Total		135	14	4	0	5	0	17	3	161	17
Port Vale	2026–27	League Two	13	2	0	0	1	0	1	0	15	2
Career total			406	41	23	0	11	0	34	5	474	46

== Honours ==
Bolton Wanderers

- EFL Trophy: 2022–23
- EFL League One play-offs: 2026

Individual

- Carlisle United Player of the Year: 2014–15
- Fleetwood Town Young Player of the Year: 2016–17
- Gillingham Player of the Year: 2020–21
