= Nathan Buddle =

English footballer (born 1993)

Personal information
- Date of birth: 29 September 1993 (age 33)
- Place of birth: Amble, England
- Position: Defender

Team information
- Current team: Morpeth Town

Youth career
- 2010–2012: Hartlepool United

Senior career*
Years	Team	Apps	(Gls)
2012–2013	Hartlepool United	0	(0)
2013–2015	Blyth Spartans	66	(3)
2015	Carlisle United	3	(0)
2015–2016	Gateshead	15	(2)
2016	→ Blyth Spartans (loan)	5	(1)
2016–2019	Blyth Spartans		
2019–2021	Spennymoor Town	39	(2)
2021–2023	Blyth Spartans	38	(0)
2023–2024	Ashington	11	(0)
2024–	Morpeth Town	31	(5)
- * Club domestic league appearances and goals as of 21:50, 14 May 2025 (UTC)

Nathan John Buddle (born 29 September 1993) is an English professional footballer who plays as a defender for Morpeth Town. He has previously played for Hartlepool United, Carlisle United and Gateshead.

== Career ==
=== Youth career ===
Buddle was born in a Amble, Northumberland. He grew up supporting Newcastle United and started out in their under-8's team and left when he was 14, whilst still at school. Buddle began his senior career with Hartlepool United. Having risen through the youth ranks with the 'monkey-hangers' and having a brilliant couple of years in the youth team, he was released at the end of the 2012–13 season.

=== Non-League ===
Buddle then signed a deal with non-league side Blyth Spartans, on non contract terms.

=== Carlisle United ===
Following some good performances for Blyth, including being part of their incredible FA Cup run which saw them defeat Buddle's former club Hartlepool United, Buddle signed for League Two side Carlisle United following a successful trial spell. The contract lasted until the end of the 2014–15 season. Buddle was then offered a new deal with the cumbrians but opted to sign for Gateshead at the start of the 2015–16 campaign.

=== Gateshead ===
Buddle left Carlisle after limited opportunities in Cumbria, and announced that he was signing for National League team Gateshead on 26 June 2015, making his debut in a 2–1 victory over Boreham Wood on 15 August. He scored his first goal for Gateshead in a 1–2 defeat against Welling United on 19 September.

=== Return to Blyth ===
On 4 January 2016, former club Blyth Spartans announced Buddle was to return on a 28-day loan, which was finalised three days later. This move was made permanent on 4 February 2016, after his Gateshead contract was cancelled by mutual consent.

=== Spennymoor Town ===
On 28 May 2019 it was confirmed, that Buddle had joined Spennymoor Town.

=== Ashington ===
In June 2023, Buddle joined Northern Premier League Division One East club Ashington, having previously played for the club's juniors teams. He departed the club in March 2024.

== Career statistics ==
As of match played on 2 February 2016

Club	Season	Division	League^{[A]}		FA Cup		League Cup		Other^{[B]}		Total	
Club	Season	Division	Apps	Goals	Apps	Goals	Apps	Goals	Apps	Goals	Apps	Goals
Hartlepool United	2012–13	League One	0	0	0	0	0	0	0	0	0	0
Hartlepool United	Total		0	0	0	0	0	0	0	0	0	0
Blyth Spartans	2013–14	NPL Premier Division	42	2	1	0	0	0	7	1	50	3
Blyth Spartans	2014–15	NPL Premier Division	24	1	7	0	0	0	2	1	33	2
Blyth Spartans	Total		66	3	8	0	0	0	9	2	83	5
Carlisle United	2014–15	League Two	3	0	0	0	0	0	0	0	3	0
Carlisle United	Total		3	0	0	0	0	0	0	0	3	0
Gateshead	2015–16	National League	15	2	0	0	0	0	1	1	16	3
Gateshead	Total		15	2	0	0	0	0	1	1	16	3
Blyth Spartans (loan)	2015–16	NPL Premier Division	5	1	0	0	0	0	0	0	5	1
Blyth Spartans	2015–16	NPL Premier Division	0	0	0	0	0	0	0	0	0	0
Blyth Spartans	Total		5	1	0	0	0	0	0	0	5	1
Career totals			89	6	8	0	0	0	10	3	107	9

A. The "League" column constitutes appearances and goals (including those as a substitute) in The Football League, National League and Northern Premier League.
B. The "Other" column constitutes appearances and goals (including those as a substitute) in the FA Trophy, Northern Premier League Challenge Cup and Northumberland Senior Cup.
