= Mark Beck =

Association football player (born 1994)

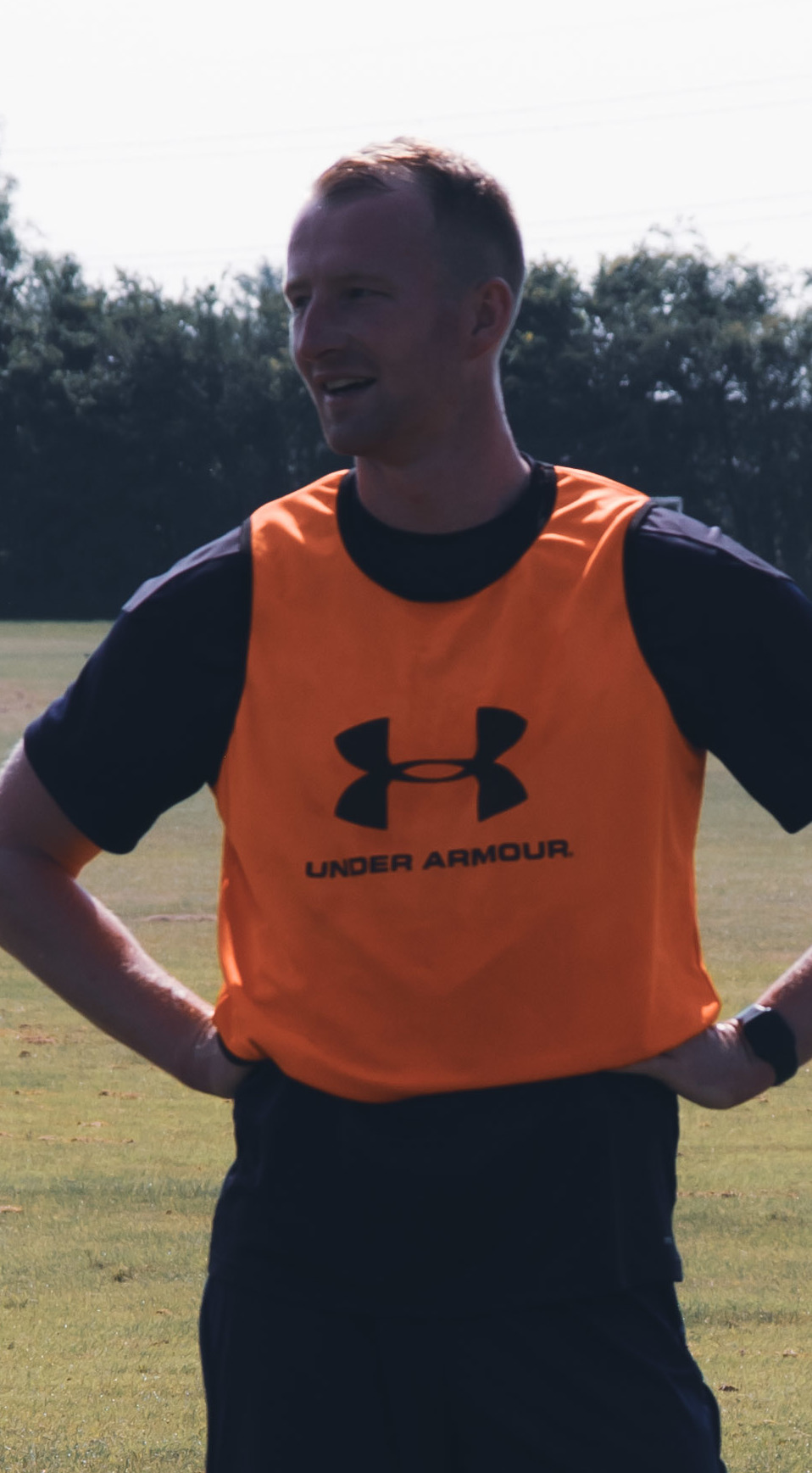
- Beck training with York City in 2021

Personal information
- Full name: Mark Andrew Beck
- Date of birth: 2 February 1994 (age 32)
- Place of birth: Sunderland, England
- Height: 6 ft 5 in (1.96 m)
- Position: Forward

Team information
- Current team: Darlington
- Number: 9

Youth career
- 2010–2012: Carlisle United

Senior career*
Years	Team	Apps	(Gls)
2012–2015	Carlisle United	66	(7)
2012	→ Workington (loan)	4	(1)
2014	→ Falkirk (loan)	15	(5)
2015–2016	Yeovil Town	8	(0)
2016	→ Wrexham (loan)	11	(0)
2016–2017	Darlington	53	(19)
2017–2022	Harrogate Town	123	(27)
2021	→ York City (loan)	18	(3)
2022–2023	Darlington	24	(15)
2023–2024	Solihull Moors	58	(11)
2024	→ Gateshead (loan)	15	(1)
2024–2026	Scunthorpe United	32	(1)
2025–2026	→ Alfreton Town (loan)	8	(3)
2026	→ Gateshead (loan)	0	(0)
2026–	Darlington	0	(0)

International career
2013	Scotland U19	3	(1)
- * Club domestic league appearances and goals as of 20:00, 12 June 2026 (UTC)

Mark Andrew Beck (born 2 February 1994) is a professional footballer who plays as a forward for National League North club Darlington. He played in the Football League for Carlisle United, Yeovil Town and Harrogate Town, and in the Scottish Championship for Falkirk, as well as spending several years in non-league football. Beck was born in England, and represented Scotland at under-19 level.

== Career ==
=== Carlisle United ===
Beck was born in Sunderland, Tyne and Wear. He started his career in the youth team of Carlisle United and signed a two-year apprenticeship in the summer of 2010.

Beck made his senior debut for Carlisle on 14 April 2012, in a 1–0 defeat to Charlton Athletic, coming on as a substitute for Tom Taiwo. On 19 April, he was offered a one-year professional contract. He scored his first goal for the club on 28 August 2012 in a 2–1 win against Ipswich Town in the League Cup with a 90th-minute header.

==== Workington (loan) ====
In March 2012, he joined Conference North club Workington on a one-month loan to gain first-team experience. He made his debut on 25 March in a 1–0 win over Harrogate Town, coming on as a substitute for Gareth Arnison. He scored the equalising goal for Workington in a 1–1 draw with Droylsden. Beck made four appearances in his short spell, scoring one goal.

==== Falkirk (loan) ====
On 30 January 2014, Beck joined Falkirk in the Scottish Championship on loan until the end of the season. He teamed up with former strike-partner Rory Loy at 'The Bairns'.

He quickly struck up a strong partnership with Loy, and after two substitute appearances, settled into a starting berth in the Falkirk team. He added another dimension to Falkirk's play; he offered them an out ball, someone who could hold the ball up and help his team get out to support Loy and himself up front. He scored the only goal of the match in a 1–0 away victory against Dundee on 29 March 2014. He was also the scorer of an equaliser in the Scottish Premiership play-off semi-final first leg against Hamilton Academical on 13 May 2014, converting a cut-back from Loy.

His final appearance for Falkirk came in the play-off semi-final second leg defeat to Hamilton, in which his team lost 1–0 (2–1 on aggregate). In his five-month spell at Falkirk, Beck played 19 times in all competitions, scoring six goals.

=== Yeovil Town ===
Beck signed for Carlisle's fellow League Two club Yeovil Town on 24 July 2015 on a two-year contract. He made his debut on 8 August 2015 against Exeter City in a 3–2 defeat.

On 26 January 2016, Beck joined National League club Wrexham on loan until the end of the season.

Upon his return from his loan at Wrexham, Beck was released by Yeovil despite having a year left on his contract.

=== Darlington and Harrogate Town ===
In August 2016, Beck signed for National League North club Darlington. He made his debut on 13 August, scoring in a 4–1 win over Boston United. Beck finished the season as the club's top scorer with 18 goals, all in league competition. He returned to full-time football when signing for Darlington's National League North rivals Harrogate Town on 7 November 2017 for an undisclosed fee.

Beck joined National League North club York City on 23 July 2021 on loan until January 2022. He scored six goals from 25 appearances in all competitions before returning to Harrogate.

He was released at the end of the season, and rejoined Darlington in July 2022. His goalscoring form returned with six from the first eight games, and his first career hat-trick helped Darlington to come back twice from behind and eliminate divisional rivals Southport from the FA Cup second qualifying round on 17 September. By January, he was top scorer in the National North with 15 and had helped Darlington to third place in the table.

=== Solihull Moors ===
During the January 2023 transfer window, National League club Solihull Moors met Beck's release clause and offered him terms beyond Darlington's reach. He signed a two-and-a-half-year contract with Moors on 26 January. He scored twice in the 2024 FA Trophy final at Wembley Stadium in a 2–2 draw against Gateshead, but the Moors went on to lose on penalties.

He joined National League rivals Gateshead ahead of the 2024–25 season on loan until 2 January 2025, and scored his first goal on his second appearance to complete a 2–0 win away to Woking. He played regularly, but mainly off the bench, and did not score again before his loan was terminated in mid-November.

=== Scunthorpe United ===
Beck returned to National League North football when he signed for Scunthorpe United on a permanent contract on 15 November 2024.

In November 2025, Beck returned to the National League North, joining Alfreton Town on an initial one-month loan. Having had his loan extended, he was recalled on 2 January 2026 to allow him to return to National League side Gateshead on loan for the remainder of the season.

On 8 May 2026, Scunthorpe announced the player would be leaving in the summer when his contract expired.

=== Another Darlington Return ===
On 12 June 2026, Beck signed for National League North side Darlington for the third time in his career.

== International career ==
Beck was eligible to represent Scotland at international level because his grandfather was born in Scotland. He received a call up to the Scotland under-19 squad in January 2012. On the same day he made his international debut and scored his first international goal in a friendly against Sweden. Beck earned three caps at under-19 level, scoring one goal, all in 2013. He also received a call-up to the Scotland under-21 team but did not make an appearance.

== Career statistics ==
As of match played 30 December 2025

Appearances and goals by club, season and competition
Club	Season	League			FA Cup		League Cup		Other		Total	
Club	Season	Division	Apps	Goals	Apps	Goals	Apps	Goals	Apps	Goals	Apps	Goals
Carlisle United	2011–12	League One	2	0	0	0	0	0	0	0	2	0
Carlisle United	2012–13	League One	27	4	1	1	3	1	0	0	31	6
Carlisle United	2013–14	League One	10	0	2	1	2	0	1 (Note: Appearance in Football League Trophy)	0	15	1
Carlisle United	2014–15	League Two	27	3	1	0	0	0	1	0	29	3
Carlisle United	Total		66	7	4	2	5	1	2	0	77	10
Workington (loan)	2011–12	Conference North	4	1	—		—		—		4	1
Falkirk (loan)	2013–14	Scottish Championship	15	5	—		—		4 (Note: Appearances in Scottish Premiership play-offs)	1	19	6
Yeovil Town	2015–16	League Two	8	0	0	0	1	0	0	0	9	0
Wrexham (loan)	2015–16	National League	11	0	—		—		—		11	0
Darlington	2016–17	National League North	41	18	1	0	—		2 (Note: Appearances in FA Trophy)	0	44	18
Darlington	2017–18	National League North	12	1	1	0	—		—		13	1
Darlington	Total		53	19	2	0	—		2	0	57	19
Harrogate Town	2017–18	National League North	20	7	—		—		6 (Note: Four appearances and three goals in FA Trophy, two appearances in National League North play-offs)	3	26	10
Harrogate Town	2018–19	National League	39	13	2	0	—		3 (Note: Two appearances in FA Trophy, one in National League play-offs)	0	44	13
Harrogate Town	2019–20	National League	25	3	2	3	—		6 (Note: Four appearances in FA Trophy, two in National League play-offs)	0	33	6
Harrogate Town	2020–21	League Two	26	4	2	1	2	0	2 (Note: Appearances in EFL Trophy)	0	32	5
Harrogate Town	2021–22	League Two	13	0	—		—		2	0	15	0
Harrogate Town	Total		123	27	6	4	2	0	19	3	150	34
York City (loan)	2021–22	National League North	18	3	5	1	—		2	2	25	6
Darlington	2022–23	National League North	24	15	2	3	—		2	0	28	18
Solihull Moors	2022–23	National League	21	3	—		—		—		21	3
Solihull Moors	2023–24	National League	37	8	2	0	—		6 (Note: Five appearances and two goals in FA Trophy, one appearance in National League play-offs)	2	45	10
Solihull Moors	Total		58	11	2	0	—		6	2	66	13
Gateshead (loan)	2024–25	National League	15	1	1	0	—		2 (Note: Appearances in National League Cup)	0	18	1
Scunthorpe United	2024–25	National League North	26	1	—		—		1	0	27	1
Scunthorpe United	2025–26	National League	6	0	0	0	—		3	1	9	1
Scunthorpe United	Total		32	1	0	0	0	0	4	1	36	2
Alfreton Town (loan)	2025–26	National League North	8	3	0	0	—		0	0	8	3
Career total			435	93	22	10	8	1	43	9	508	113

== Honours ==
Harrogate Town

- National League play-offs: 2020
- National League North play-offs: 2018
- FA Trophy: 2019–20

Solihull Moors

- FA Trophy runner-up: 2023–24
