= Sean O'Hanlon =

English footballer

Personal information
- Full name: Sean Philip O'Hanlon
- Date of birth: 2 January 1983 (age 43)
- Place of birth: Liverpool, England
- Position: Centre back

Senior career*
Years	Team	Apps	(Gls)
2002–2004	Everton	0	(0)
2004	→ Swindon Town (loan)	10	(1)
2004–2006	Swindon Town	91	(7)
2006–2011	Milton Keynes Dons	157	(15)
2011–2012	Hibernian	23	(2)
2013–2015	Carlisle United	81	(5)
2015–2016	Stockport County	39	(1)
Total		401	(31)

International career
2003	England U20	2	(0)
- * Club domestic league appearances and goals

Sean Philip O'Hanlon (born 2 January 1983) is an English former footballer who played as a centre back. O'Hanlon played for Swindon Town, Milton Keynes Dons, Hibernian, Carlisle United and Stockport County.

== Playing career ==
O'Hanlon started his career in his native Merseyside with Everton, but he did not make an appearance for their first team. He joined Swindon Town, initially on loan, and he became a regular in their first team squad and was made team captain after the departure of Andy Gurney in 2005.

Following the expiry of O'Hanlon's contract at Swindon in 2006, O'Hanlon signed for Milton Keynes Dons, with the transfer fee set by tribunal at £175,000. He started 94 matches and scored 9 goals in all competitions across his first two seasons at the club. One of the most notable moments of O'Hanlon's career was when he scored a goal with a towering header at Wembley Stadium in the 2008 Football League Trophy final victory against Grimsby Town. On 24 December 2008, he extended his contract with MK Dons until summer 2011. He was named in the PFA Team of the Year for the 2008–09 League One season. He missed most of the 2009–10 season due to a knee injury. At the end of the 2010–11 season, O'Hanlon was told his contract would not be renewed, despite having made 37 appearances that season.

O'Hanlon signed for Scottish Premier League club Hibernian on a two-year contract in June 2011. He lost his place in the Hibs first team after Pat Fenlon was appointed manager. O'Hanlon left Hibs by mutual consent on 31 August 2012. He played as a trialist for junior club Bonnyrigg in November 2012.

O'Hanlon signed for Football League One club Carlisle United on 11 January 2013, agreeing a contract with the club until the end of the 2012–13 season. on 12 April 2013 he signed a two-year extension to his contract. On 4 May 2015, O'Hanlon was released by Carlisle.

O'Hanlon signed for Stockport County on 29 May 2015 on a season long contract. He was immediately given the role of captain.. He left Stockport at end of the 2015–16 season.

== Coaching career ==
Between June 2022 and June 2023, O'Hanlon was employed as the under-23s manager at Marine.

== Career statistics ==
Appearances and goals by club, season and competition
Club	Season	League			National cup (Note: Includes FA Cup, Scottish Cup)		League cup (Note: Includes Football League Cup, Scottish League Cup)		Other		Total	
Club	Season	Division	Apps	Goals	Apps	Goals	Apps	Goals	Apps	Goals	Apps	Goals
Everton	2003–04	Premier League	0	0	0	0	0	0	0	0	0	0
Swindon Town (loan)	2003–04	Second Division	10	2	0	0	0	0	0	0	10	2
Swindon Town	2003–04	Second Division	11	0	0	0	0	0	0	0	11	0
Swindon Town	2004–05	League One	40	3	3	1	2	0	2 (Note: Appearance(s) in Football League Trophy)	0	47	4
Swindon Town	2005–06	League One	40	4	2	0	0	0	2	0	44	4
Swindon Town	Total		101	7	5	1	2	0	4	0	112	10
Milton Keynes Dons	2006–07	League Two	36	4	2	0	2	0	3 (Note: 1 appearance in Football League Trophy, 2 appearances in Football League Two play-offs)	0	43	4
Milton Keynes Dons	2007–08	League Two	43	4	1	0	1	0	6	1	51	5
Milton Keynes Dons	2008–09	League One	40	3	1	0	2	1	1	0	44	4
Milton Keynes Dons	2009–10	League One	6	0	0	0	0	0	0	0	6	0
Milton Keynes Dons	2010–11	League One	34	4	1	0	2	0	3 (Note: 1 appearance in Football League Trophy, 2 appearances in Football League One play-offs)	0	38	4
Milton Keynes Dons	Total		157	15	5	0	7	1	13	1	182	17
Hibernian	2011–12	Scottish Premiership	22	2	1	0	2	0	0	0	25	2
Hibernian	2012–13	Scottish Premiership	1	0	0	0	1	0	0	0	2	0
Hibernian	Total		23	2	1	0	3	0	0	0	27	2
Carlisle United	2012–13	League One	19	1	0	0	0	0	0	0	19	1
Carlisle United	2013–14	League One	33	4	4	0	0	0	2	0	39	4
Carlisle United	2014–15	League Two	29	1	0	0	1	0	2	0	32	1
Carlisle United	Total		81	6	4	0	1	0	4	0	90	6
Stockport County	2015–16	National League North	Unknown									
Career total			362	30	15	1	13	1	21	1	411	35

== Honours ==
Milton Keynes Dons

- Football League Two: 2007–08
- Football League Trophy: 2007–08

Individual

- PFA Team of the Year: 2008–09 League One
