= Josh Gillies =

English footballer (born 1990)

Personal information
- Full name: Joshua James Gillies
- Date of birth: 12 June 1990 (age 36)
- Place of birth: Sunderland, Tyne and Wear, England
- Position: Winger

Team information
- Current team: Blyth Spartans
- Number: 7

Senior career*
Years	Team	Apps	(Gls)
2007	Sunderland Nissan		
2008	Newcastle Blue Star		
2009–2010	Blyth Spartans	18	(1)
2010	Whitley Bay	11	(2)
2010–2013	Gateshead	91	(19)
2013–2015	Carlisle United	12	(1)
2013	→ Cambridge United (loan)	2	(1)
2014	→ Cambridge United (loan)	10	(2)
2014	→ FC Halifax Town (loan)	1	(0)
2015	→ Gateshead (loan)	5	(1)
2015–2016	Gateshead	23	(4)
2016–2018	Darlington	76	(19)
2018–2021	South Shields	41	(8)
2021-	Blyth Spartans	1	(0)

International career
2013	England C	2	(0)
- * Club domestic league appearances and goals as of 08:48, 15 July 2018 (UTC)

Joshua James Gillies (born 12 June 1990) is an English footballer who plays as a winger for Blyth Spartans. Gillies played in the Football League for Carlisle United.

== Career ==
Gillies began his career with non-league Sunderland Nissan and Newcastle Blue Star. In 2009, he moved to Blyth Spartans under Mick Tait, but failed to hold down a first-team place and was allowed to join Whitley Bay in March 2010. At Whitley Bay Gilles scored in the final of the FA Vase as they beat Wroxham 6–1 at Wembley Stadium.

=== Gateshead ===
Gilles joined Conference Premier side Gateshead in June 2010. He top-scored for Gateshead in 2012–13 and established himself as one of the best players in non-league football, and was rewarded with a call up to the England C team.

=== Carlisle United ===
He signed for Carlisle United in June 2013. He made his Football League debut in a 5–1 defeat against Leyton Orient on 3 August 2013. On 28 November 2013, Gillies joined Cambridge United on loan until January. He made his debut for Cambridge two days later in a 1–0 victory over Salisbury City in the FA Trophy. He scored his first goal for Cambridge on 10 December 2013 in a 3–0 victory over Macclesfield Town. After the expiration of his loan, Gillies rejoined Cambridge on 24 January 2014 on loan for the remainder of the season.

Gillies left Carlisle on 4 May 2015, following the expiry of his contract.

=== Later career ===
On 12 June 2015, Gillies re-signed for Conference Premier side Gateshead on a permanent deal. After a year, he signed for Darlington of the National League North, where he was a regular in the team for two seasons. In 2018, he moved on to South Shields of the Northern Premier League.

In July 2021 he returned to Blyth Spartans.

== International career ==
Gillies was selected and called up to the England C team in 2012. He made his international debut on 12 September against Belgium, and also featured against Turkey on 5 February 2013.

== Career statistics ==
As of match played on 30 April 2016

Club	Season	Division	League^{[A]}		FA Cup		League Cup		Other^{[B]}		Total	
Club	Season	Division	Apps	Goals	Apps	Goals	Apps	Goals	Apps	Goals	Apps	Goals
Blyth Spartans	2009–10	Conference North	18	1	4	0	0	0	3	0	25	1
Blyth Spartans	Total		18	1	4	0	0	0	3	0	25	1
Whitley Bay	2009–10	Northern League	11	2	0	0	0	0	3	2	14	4
Whitley Bay	Total		11	2	0	0	0	0	3	2	14	4
Gateshead	2010–11	Conference Premier	19	1	0	0	0	0	2	0	21	1
Gateshead	2011–12	Conference Premier	27	2	0	0	0	0	4	0	31	2
Gateshead	2012–13	Conference Premier	45	15	1	0	0	0	3	0	49	15
Gateshead	Total		91	18	1	0	0	0	9	0	101	18
Carlisle United	2013–14	League One	6	0	1	0	1	0	2	0	10	0
Carlisle United	2014–15	League Two	6	1	0	0	0	0	2	0	8	1
Carlisle United	Total		12	1	1	0	1	0	4	0	18	1
Cambridge United (loan)	2013–14	Conference Premier	2	1	0	0	0	0	2	0	4	1
Cambridge United (loan)	2013–14	Conference Premier	10	2	0	0	0	0	1	0	11	2
Cambridge United (loan)	Total		12	3	0	0	0	0	3	0	15	3
Gateshead (loan)	2014–15	Conference Premier	5	1	0	0	0	0	0	0	5	1
Gateshead	2015–16	National League	23	4	0	0	0	0	3	2	26	6
Gateshead	Total		28	5	0	0	0	0	3	2	31	7
Career totals			172	30	6	0	1	0	25	4	204	34

A. The "League" column constitutes appearances and goals (including those as a substitute) in The Football League, Football Conference and Northern League.
B. The "Other" column constitutes appearances and goals (including those as a substitute) in the Football League Trophy, FA Trophy, FA Vase, Northumberland Senior Cup and Northern League Cup.

== Honours ==
Cambridge United

- FA Trophy: 2013–14
