= Brad Potts =

English footballer

Personal information
- Full name: Bradley Potts
- Date of birth: 3 July 1994 (age 32)
- Place of birth: Hexham, England
- Height: 1.88 m (6 ft 2 in)
- Positions: Midfielder; wing-back

Team information
- Current team: Preston North End
- Number: 44

Youth career
- 2005: Wark
- 2010–2012: Carlisle United

Senior career*
| Years | Team | Apps | (Gls) |
| 2012–2015 | Carlisle United | 103 | (9) |
| 2015–2017 | Blackpool | 87 | (16) |
| 2017–2019 | Barnsley | 59 | (9) |
| 2019– | Preston North End | 234 | (22) |

International career
| 2012 | England U19 | 1 | (0) |
- * Club domestic league appearances and goals as of 19:35, 24 August 2026 (UTC)

Bradley Potts (born 3 July 1994) is an English footballer who plays as a midfielder and wing-back for EFL Championship club Preston North End.

== Career ==
Potts began his career with Newcastle United youth academy before moving to Carlisle United and made his professional debut on 11 August 2012 in a 1–0 win against Accrington Stanley in the first round of the League Cup. He made his league debut a week later, playing 90 minutes of a 1–1 draw against Stevenage on 18 August. On 12 June 2015, Potts signed for Blackpool after his contract at Carlisle expired. He scored the opening goal for Blackpool in the 2017 League Two play-off final win against Exeter City. On 3 August 2017 Potts joined Championship side Barnsley on a three-year deal for an undisclosed fee. On 4 January 2019, Potts moved to Championship side Preston North End for a reported incoming record transfer fee paid by the club in excess of £1.5 million.

== International career ==
On 8 November 2012, Potts was called up to the England under-19 squad to play Finland in a friendly on 13 November in Telford. He made his debut in the game which England won 1–0.

== Career statistics ==
As of match played 2 May 2026

| Club | Season | League | | | FA Cup | | League Cup | | Other | | Total | |
| Club | Season | Division | Apps | Goals | Apps | Goals | Apps | Goals | Apps | Goals | Apps | Goals |
|---|---|---|---|---|---|---|---|---|---|---|---|---|
| Carlisle United | 2012–13 | League One | 27 | 0 | 1 | 0 | 2 | 0 | 1 (Note: Appearance(s) in Football League Trophy) | 0 | 31 | 0 |
| Carlisle United | 2013–14 | League One | 37 | 2 | 3 | 0 | 2 | 0 | 2 | 0 | 44 | 2 |
| Carlisle United | 2014–15 | League Two | 39 | 7 | 1 | 0 | 1 | 0 | 2 | 1 | 43 | 8 |
| Carlisle United | Total | | 103 | 9 | 5 | 0 | 5 | 0 | 5 | 1 | 118 | 10 |
| Blackpool | 2015–16 | League One | 45 | 6 | 0 | 0 | 1 | 0 | 0 | 0 | 46 | 6 |
| Blackpool | 2016–17 | League Two | 42 | 10 | 3 | 1 | 2 | 1 | 5 (Note: Two appearances in EFL Trophy and three in League Two play-offs) | 1 | 52 | 13 |
| Blackpool | Total | | 87 | 16 | 3 | 1 | 3 | 1 | 5 | 1 | 98 | 19 |
| Barnsley | 2017–18 | Championship | 37 | 3 | 1 | 1 | 3 | 0 | 0 | 0 | 41 | 4 |
| Barnsley | 2018–19 | League One | 22 | 6 | 2 | 1 | 1 | 0 | 1 | 0 | 26 | 7 |
| Barnsley | Total | | 59 | 9 | 3 | 2 | 4 | 0 | 1 | 0 | 67 | 11 |
| Preston North End | 2018–19 | Championship | 10 | 2 | 0 | 0 | 0 | 0 | 0 | 0 | 10 | 2 |
| Preston North End | 2019–20 | Championship | 32 | 2 | 1 | 0 | 3 | 0 | 0 | 0 | 36 | 2 |
| Preston North End | 2020–21 | Championship | 42 | 5 | 1 | 0 | 2 | 0 | 0 | 0 | 45 | 5 |
| Preston North End | 2021–22 | Championship | 35 | 1 | 1 | 0 | 4 | 0 | — | | 40 | 1 |
| Preston North End | 2022–23 | Championship | 39 | 4 | 0 | 0 | 2 | 1 | — | | 41 | 5 |
| Preston North End | 2023–24 | Championship | 31 | 2 | 1 | 0 | 0 | 0 | — | | 32 | 2 |
| Preston North End | 2024–25 | Championship | 29 | 4 | 2 | 0 | 3 | 0 | — | | 34 | 4 |
| Preston North End | 2025–26 | Championship | 16 | 2 | 1 | 0 | 0 | 0 | — | | 17 | 2 |
| Preston North End | 2026–27 | Championship | 0 | 0 | 0 | 0 | 0 | 0 | — | | 0 | 0 |
| Preston North End | Total | | 234 | 22 | 7 | 0 | 14 | 1 | 0 | 0 | 255 | 23 |
| Career total | | | 483 | 56 | 18 | 3 | 26 | 2 | 11 | 2 | 538 | 63 |

== Honours ==
Blackpool

- EFL League Two play-offs: 2017

Barnsley

- EFL League One second-place promotion: 2018–19
