= Courtney Meppen-Walters =

English footballer (1994–2026)

- Meppen-Walters with Nantwich Town

Personal information
- Full name: Courtney Alister Lloyd Meppen-Walters
- Date of birth: 2 August 1994
- Place of birth: Bury, England
- Date of death: 28 September 2026 (aged 32)
- Height: 6 ft 3 in (1.91 m)
- Position: Defender

Youth career
- –2012: Manchester City

Senior career*
Years	Team	Apps	(Gls)
2012–2013	Manchester City	0	(0)
2013–2015	Carlisle United	39	(2)
2016	Ashton United		
2016	Chorley	10	(1)
2016–2017	Stockport County	27	(4)
2017–2018	Glossop North End		
2018–2020	Chorley	74	(6)
2020–2021	AFC Telford United	7	(0)
2021–2023	Radcliffe	4	(0)
2022	→ Avro (loan)	3	(1)
2022–2023	→ Guiseley (loan)	21	(2)
2023–2024	Guiseley	4	(0)
2023–2024	→ Nantwich Town (loan)	5	(0)
2024	Nantwich Town	24	(3)
2024–2025	Bury	5	(0)
2025	→ Stalybridge Celtic (loan)	8	(1)
Total		231	(20)

International career
2010–2011	England U17	12	(1)
2011	England U18	1	(0)
- * Club domestic league appearances and goals

Courtney Alister Lloyd Meppen-Walters (2 August 1994 – 28 September 2026) was an English professional footballer who played as a defender.

Meppen-Walters was a youth player at Manchester City, and was released in 2013 while serving a prison sentence for causing death by careless driving. He played for two seasons in the Football League for Carlisle United, and represented several non-League clubs.

== Club career ==
=== Manchester City ===
Meppen-Walters was born in Bury, Greater Manchester on 2 August 1994. He began his career with Manchester City, and was an unused substitute for two UEFA Champions League group games in late 2012, against Ajax and Borussia Dortmund.

In September 2012, Meppen-Walters was driving at 55.89 mph in a 30 mph zone and caused a crash that killed a brother and sister. He pleaded guilty in February 2013 to causing death by careless driving and was sentenced to 16 months in prison. His contract expired in June 2013, with the BBC reporting that his release from Manchester City was for sporting reasons. After being ordered to spend half of his sentence in prison, he was mistakenly freed in July, and voluntarily returned to custody.

=== Carlisle United ===
In November 2013, after being released from prison, Meppen-Walters joined League One club Carlisle United on trial, and later that month he signed an initial one-month contract. Manager Graham Kavanagh announced that Meppen-Walter would be considered for the club's next game in the FA Cup. He made his debut in that game on 7 December in the second round, a 3–2 home win over Brentford, and was praised by Kavanagh.

On 14 December 2014, Meppen-Walters signed a two-and-a-half-year contract keeping him with the Cumbrian outfit until the summer of 2016. He made his senior league debut later on the same day against Tranmere Rovers, a 4–1 win at Brunton Park. A week later, he was sent off in a 2–0 loss away to Walsall for a foul that denied a goalscoring opportunity for Troy Hewitt. He made 21 appearances in his first season, scoring once on 8 March 2014 in a 2–1 loss away to Port Vale.

With Carlisle relegated to League Two, Meppen-Walters made another 21 appearances in 2014–15, and scored once in a 2–1 defeat away to Newport County on 3 January 2015. Having made no appearances in 2015–16, he left the club by mutual consent in November 2015. It was reported in the local News and Star that manager Keith Curle had reservations about the player's diet and conditioning.

=== Non-League ===
After a spell with Ashton United in the Northern Premier League, Meppen-Walters signed for Conference North club Chorley in March 2016, managed by former Carlisle player Matt Jansen. Two months later, he joined Stockport County in the same division. While back at Chorley, in January 2019, he admitted to drink driving and was banned from driving for 22 months.

In June 2020, Meppen-Walters signed for AFC Telford United, again in the sixth tier. He joined Radcliffe in August 2021. On 26 December 2022, he joined Guiseley on loan. In May 2023, he rejoined Guiseley permanently following the expiration of his contract at Radcliffe.

On 30 December 2023, Meppen-Walters joined Nantwich Town on an initial one-month loan deal, before joining the club permanently on 26 January 2024. On 18 December 2024, Meppen-Walters joined North West Counties Football League Premier Division side Bury for an undisclosed fee. In January 2025 he joined Stalybridge Celtic on loan. He was released by Bury in 2025.

== International career ==
Meppen-Walters played for England at under-17 and under-18 levels. He was the captain of the latter side.

== Death ==
Meppen-Walters died on 28 September 2026, aged 32.

== Career statistics ==
Appearances and goals by club, season and competition
Club	Season	League			FA Cup		League Cup		Other		Total	
Club	Season	Division	Apps	Goals	Apps	Goals	Apps	Goals	Apps	Goals	Apps	Goals
Manchester City	2012–13	Premier League	0	0	0	0	0	0	0	0	0	0
Carlisle United	2013–14	League One	20	1	1	0	—		—		21	1
Carlisle United	2014–15	League Two	19	1	1	0	1	0	0	0	21	1
Carlisle United	Total		39	2	2	0	1	0	0	0	42	2
Chorley	2015–16	National League North	10	1	—		—		—		10	1
Stockport County	2016–17	National League North	27	4	3	0	—		2 (Note: Appearance(s) in the FA Trophy)	0	32	4
Chorley	2018–19	National League North	39	4	5	1	—		2 (Note: Appearance(s) in the National League North play-offs)	0	46	5
Chorley	2019–20	National League	35	2	2	0	—		2	0	39	2
Chorley	Total		74	6	7	1	—		4	0	85	7
AFC Telford United	2020–21	National League North	7	0	2	0	—		2	0	11	0
Radcliffe	2022–23	NPL Premier Division	4	0	1	0	—		1	0	6	0
Avro (loan)	2022–23	NWCFL Premier Division	3	1	—		—		—		3	1
Guiseley (loan)	2022–23	NPL Premier Division	21	2	—		—		—		21	2
Guiseley	2023–24	NPL Premier Division	4	0	0	0	—		0	0	4	0
Guiseley	Total		25	2	0	0	—		0	0	25	2
Nantwich Town	2023–24	NPL Division One West	18	1	—		—		1	0	19	1
Nantwich Town	2024–25	NPL Division One West	11	2	1	0	—		1	0	13	2
Nantwich Town	Total		29	3	1	0	—		2	0	32	3
Bury	2024–25	NWCFL Premier Division	5	0	—		—		—		5	0
Stalybridge Celtic (loan)	2024–25	NPL Division One West	8	1	—		—		—		8	1
Career total			231	20	16	1	1	0	11	0	259	21

== Honours ==
Chorley

- National League North Play-offs: 2018–19
