= Paul Corry =

Irish retired footballer

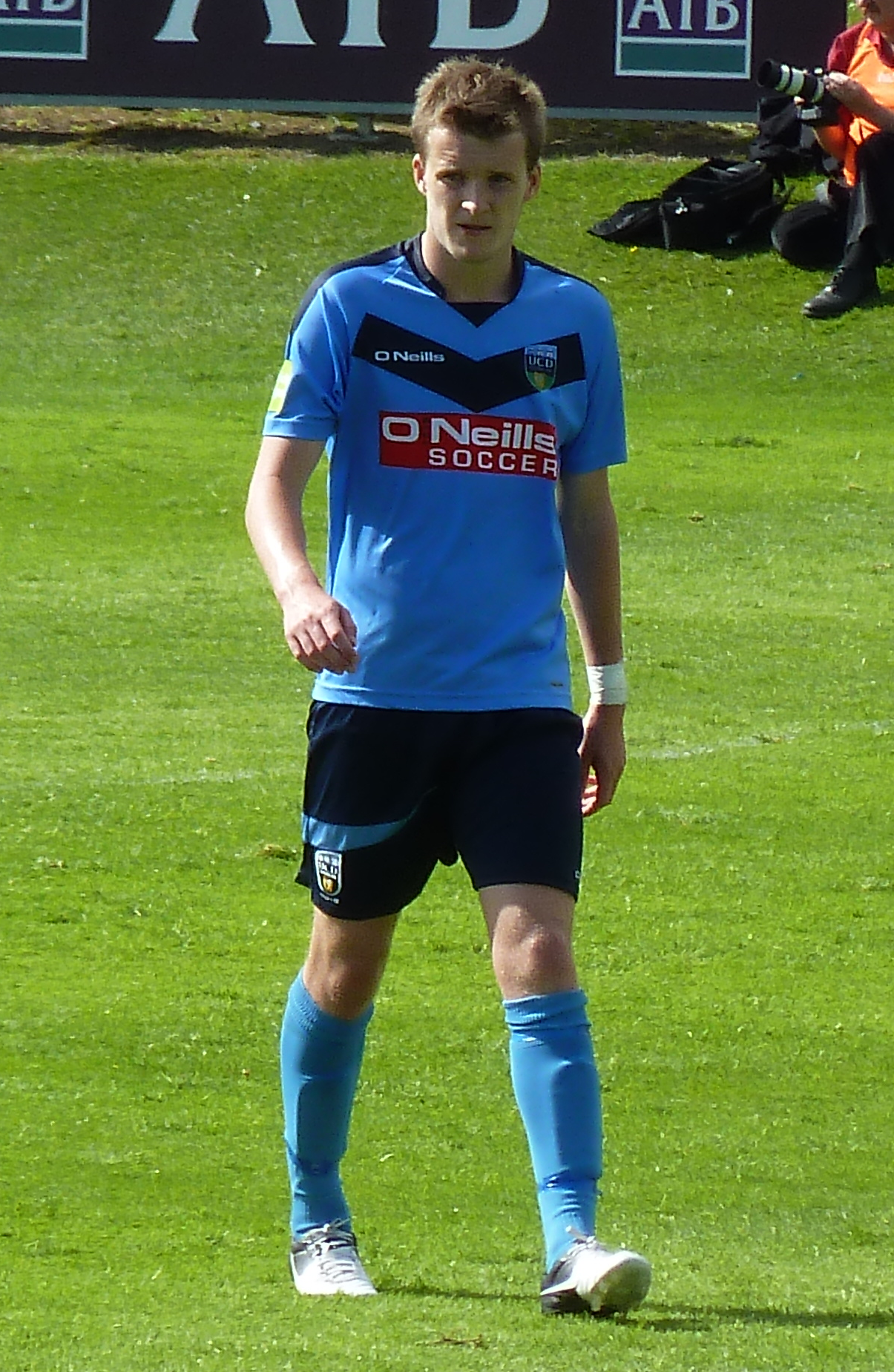
- Corry in action for UCD in July 2012

Personal information
- Full name: Paul Corry
- Date of birth: 3 February 1991 (age 35)
- Place of birth: Dublin, Ireland
- Height: 1.88 m (6 ft 2 in)
- Position: Midfielder

Youth career
- Belvedere

Senior career*
Years	Team	Apps	(Gls)
2009–2012	UCD	102	(10)
2012–2015	Sheffield Wednesday	47	(0)
2013	→ Tranmere Rovers (loan)	6	(0)
2015	→ Carlisle United (loan)	6	(1)
2015–2016	Northampton Town	3	(0)
2017	Shamrock Rovers	2	(0)

International career
2007	Republic of Ireland U17	3	(0)
- * Club domestic league appearances and goals as of 23:28 13 October 2017 (UTC)

Paul Corry (born 3 February 1991) is an Irish former footballer who played with UCD, Sheffield Wednesday, Northampton Town and Shamrock Rovers.

== Career ==
Corry grew up in Castleknock, Dublin, and attended Belvedere College. Corry has represented his country at various underage levels as well as being selected for the Republic of Ireland U-23 squad. The talented midfielder combined a footballing career with a degree in Commerce during his 3 years at University College Dublin.

Corry was a member of the successful Belvedere side alongside the likes of Matt Doherty and Jake Carroll who won the FAI Under-17 Cup in 2009 by beating Kilmallock United.

The young midfielder has been on the books of University College Dublin since 2009 having joined the club from Belvedere.

Corry was on trial with Burnley for two weeks in July 2009 but chose to continue his education at Belfield, as he felt he was not ready for a move to another football club at that moment in time. Having signed for UCD in the summer of 2009, Corry made an instant impact at the club making 10 appearances and scoring 3 goals as the then 18-year-old helped UCD to the 2009 League of Ireland First Division title and promotion to the Premier Division.

Corry re-signed for UCD for the 2012 season, and overall has made 105 appearances for the club, including 10 goals. Corry scored his first goal of the 2012 season away to Shelbourne, his 25-yard screamer snatching a win for UCD. He was then called up to the Republic of Ireland U-21 side for the 2013 UEFA Euro U-21 Championship qualifier against Turkey U-21, however he did not make an appearance for the national side. His successful 2012 season saw Corry being watched by many English sides, and he was finally signed up by newly promoted Championship side Sheffield Wednesday in England. Corry had finally felt that now was the right time for a big move in hope of a successful footballing career following his successful graduation with a BComm degree from UCD. He made his Owls debut in the League Cup fixture away at Southampton on 25 September 2012. He made his league debut when Wednesday hosted Leeds United live on SKY on 19 October 2012. He was released by Sheffield Wednesday at the end of the 2014/15 season.

Later that summer he joined League Two side Northampton Town on a free transfer. However, he suffered a cruciate ligament injury in late September 2015 which ruled him out for the season.

He was released by Northampton Town at the end of the 2015/16 season.

He signed for League of Ireland Premier Division side Shamrock Rovers in November 2016.

On 12 October 2017 Paul was forced to retire from football due to constant struggles with his knee.

== Honours ==
UCD

- League of Ireland First Division (1): 2009

Northampton Town

- EFL League Two (1): 2015–16
