= Jack Lynch (footballer, born 1995) =

English footballer

Personal information
- Full name: Jack William Lynch
- Date of birth: 22 June 1995 (age 31)
- Place of birth: Blackburn, England
- Position: Midfielder

Team information
- Current team: Chorley)
- Number: 7

Senior career*
| Years | Team | Apps | (Gls) |
| 2013–2014 | Carlisle United | 1 | (0) |
| 2014– | Chorley | 35 | (2) |
| 2015 | → Clitheroe (dual registration) | | |
| 2016–2017 | → Colne (loan) | 13 | (1) |
- * Club domestic league appearances and goals as of 01:00, 3 January 2017 (UTC)

Jack William Lynch (born 22 June 1995) is an English footballer who plays as a midfielder for Northern Premier League Division One North club Colne, on loan from National League North side Chorley.

== Career ==
Lynch began his career with Carlisle United and made his professional debut on 10 August 2013 in a 4–0 defeat at Bradford City. He left Carlisle in 2014 and subsequently joined National League North side Chorley. He made his Chorley debut on 12 August in a league match against Colwyn Bay. In 2015, Lynch signed with Clitheroe of Northern Premier League Division One North on a dual registration deal. He returned to Chorley in 2016 before going out on loan to fellow NPL Division One North club Colne, he went to Colne on an initial one-month loan on 23 October but the deal was extended to the end of the season on 22 December.

== Career statistics ==
=== Club ===
As of 3 January 2017.

Club statistics
| Club | Season | League | | | Cup (Note: Includes the FA Cup) | | League Cup (Note: Includes the EFL Cup and Northern Premier League Challenge Cup) | | Continental | | Other (Note: Includes the EFL Trophy and FA Trophy) | | Total | |
| Club | Season | Division | Apps | Goals | Apps | Goals | Apps | Goals | Apps | Goals | Apps | Goals | Apps | Goals |
|---|---|---|---|---|---|---|---|---|---|---|---|---|---|---|
| Carlisle United | 2013–14 | EFL League One | 1 | 0 | 0 | 0 | 0 | 0 | — | | 1 (Note: One appearance in 2013–14 Football League Trophy) | 0 | 2 | 0 |
| Carlisle United | Total | | 1 | 0 | 0 | 0 | 0 | 0 | — | | 1 | 0 | 2 | 0 |
| Chorley | 2014–15 | National League North | 11 | 0 | 0 | 0 | 0 | 0 | — | | 1 (Note: One appearance in 2014–15 FA Trophy) | 0 | 12 | 0 |
| Chorley | 2015–16 | National League North | 24 | 2 | 0 | 0 | 0 | 0 | — | | 0 | 0 | 24 | 2 |
| Chorley | 2016–17 | National League North | 0 | 0 | 0 | 0 | 0 | 0 | — | | 0 | 0 | 0 | 0 |
| Chorley | Total | | 35 | 2 | 0 | 0 | 0 | 0 | — | | 1 | 0 | 36 | 2 |
| Clitheroe (loan) | 2015–16 | NPL Division One North | – | – | – | – | – | – | — | | – | – | – | – |
| Colne (loan) | 2016–17 | NPL Division One North | 13 | 1 | 0 | 0 | 1 | 0 | — | | 0 | 0 | 14 | 1 |
| Career total | | | 49 | 3 | 0 | 0 | 1 | 0 | — | | 2 | 0 | 52 | 3 |
