= Liam Noble (footballer) =

English footballer (born 1991)

- Noble playing for Forest Green Rovers in October 2016

Personal information
- Full name: Liam Thomas Noble
- Date of birth: 8 May 1991 (age 35)
- Place of birth: Newcastle upon Tyne, England
- Position: Midfielder

Team information
- Current team: Easington Colliery

Youth career
- –2010: Sunderland

Senior career*
Years	Team	Apps	(Gls)
2010–2012	Sunderland	0	(0)
2011	→ Carlisle United (loan)	21	(3)
2011–2012	→ Carlisle United (loan)	40	(6)
2012–2014	Carlisle United	69	(11)
2014–2016	Notts County	70	(13)
2016–2017	Forest Green Rovers	49	(8)
2018	Notts County	18	(1)
2018–2019	Hartlepool United	54	(16)
2019–2024	Morpeth Town	102	(18)
2024	→ Hebburn Town (loan)	12	(1)
2024–2025	Hebburn Town	38	(3)
2025	Newcastle Blue Star	1	(0)
2025–2026	Ashington	22	(0)
2026–	Easington Colliery	2	(0)
- * Club domestic league appearances and goals as of 13:27, 20 May 2026 (UTC)

Liam Thomas Noble (born 8 May 1991) is an English professional footballer who plays as a midfielder for Easington Colliery.

He has formerly played for Hartlepool United, Forest Green Rovers, Notts County, Carlisle United and Sunderland.

== Club career ==
=== Early career ===
Noble rose through the academy at Sunderland and entered the reserve team in 2009–10, whilst continuing to impress for Kevin Ball's youth side.

==== Carlisle United (loan) ====
Taken in on loan at League One side Carlisle United in January 2011, he made his debut for the club in a 4–0 win over Bristol Rovers on 15 January. After his loan deal was extended until the end of the season, he won his first league start on 22 January, helping Carlisle to a 1–0 win over at Notts County at Meadow Lane.

His impressive performances for the Cumbrians impressed manager Greg Abbott enough to take Noble on a six-month loan deal. He joined them permanently on 12 January 2012

=== Notts County ===
On 3 June 2014, Noble joined Notts County on a two-year on a free transfer following his release by Carlisle United.

On 11 August 2015, he scored a brace in a 2–1 upset win at Championship side Huddersfield Town in the first round of the League Cup, after Notts had been trailing 0–1.

=== Forest Green Rovers ===
In June 2016, Noble signed for National League club Forest Green Rovers on a two-year contract. He made his debut for the club on 16 August 2016 in a 1–0 away win at Woking where he provided the assist for the winning goal. He scored his first goal for the club on 3 September 2016 in a 2–1 away win against Chester.

On 14 May 2017, he captained Forest Green to promotion to the Football League for the first time in the club's history in the 2016–17 National League play-off final at Wembley Stadium with a 3–1 win over Tranmere Rovers.

In October 2017, Noble was released by Forest Green Rovers.

=== Notts County ===
In October 2017, Noble signed for a second spell at Notts County on an 18 Month contract starting on 1 January 2018. On 30 June 2018, Noble left Notts County by mutual consent. He made 18 league appearances for the League Two side, scoring once.

=== Hartlepool United ===
Following his release from Notts County, Noble signed for National League club Hartlepool United becoming the club's fifth signing of the season. Noble scored on his debut for Pools in a 1–1 draw against Maidstone United in August 2018. Noble finished the 2018–19 season as the club's top scorer, scoring 13 goals in 44 appearances while also providing nine assists. In May 2019, Noble signed a new contract to keep him at the club for the 2019–20 season.

=== Morpeth Town ===
On 1 October 2019, Noble joined Northern Premier League Premier Division club Morpeth Town.

=== Hebburn Town ===
On 1 March 2024, Noble joined Hebburn Town on loan for the remainder of the season. He made twelve appearances during his loan spell, helping Hebburn to be crowned NPL Division One East champions.

On 29 May 2024, Noble returned to Hebburn Town on a permanent basis.

He departed the club by mutual consent in August 2025.

=== Newcastle Blue Star ===
In August 2025, Noble joined Northern League Division One club Newcastle Blue Star.

=== Ashington ===
On 19 September 2025, Noble joined Northern Premier League Division One East club Ashington.

== Career statistics ==
=== Club ===
As of match played 11 April 2026

Appearances and goals by club, season and competition
Club	Season	League			FA Cup		League Cup		Other		Total	
Club	Season	Division	Apps	Goals	Apps	Goals	Apps	Goals	Apps	Goals	Apps	Goals
Sunderland	2010–11	Premier League	0	0	0	0	0	0	—		0	0
Carlisle United	2010–11	League One	21	3	0	0	0	0	3 (Note: Appearances in Football League Trophy)	0	24	3
Carlisle United	2011–12	League One	40	6	2	1	2	0	1	0	45	7
Carlisle United	2012–13	League One	35	6	1	1	3	0	1	0	40	7
Carlisle United	2013–14	League One	34	5	3	0	2	0	1	0	40	5
Carlisle United	Total		130	20	6	2	7	0	4	0	149	22
Notts County	2014–15	League One	33	5	2	0	1	0	2	1	38	6
Notts County	2015–16	League Two	37	8	1	0	1	2	1	0	40	10
Notts County	Total		70	13	3	0	2	2	3	1	78	16
Forest Green Rovers	2016–17	National League	40	7	0	0	—		3 (Note: Appearances in National League play-offs)	1	43	8
Forest Green Rovers	2017–18	League Two	9	1	0	0	1	0	1 (Note: Appearance in EFL Trophy)	0	11	1
Forest Green Rovers	Total		49	8	0	0	1	0	4	1	54	9
Notts County	2017–18	League Two	18	1	1	0	0	0	2 (Note: Appearances in League Two play-offs)	0	21	1
Hartlepool United	2018–19	National League	42	13	2	0	—		0	0	44	13
Hartlepool United	2019–20	National League	12	3	0	0	—		0	0	12	3
Hartlepool United	Total		54	16	2	0	0	0	0	0	56	16
Morpeth Town	2019–20	NPL Premier Division	21	2	1	0	—		3 (Note: Two appearances and one goal in FA Trophy, one appearance in League Challenge Cup)	1	25	3
Morpeth Town	2020–21	NPL Premier Division	7	1	2	0	—		3 (Note: Appearance(s) in FA Trophy)	1	12	2
Morpeth Town	2021–22	NPL Premier Division	37	9	5	0	—		4	1	46	10
Morpeth Town	2022–23	NPL Premier Division	16	3	0	0	—		1	0	17	3
Morpeth Town	2023–24	NPL Premier Division	21	3	3	0	—		0	0	24	3
Morpeth Town	Total		102	18	10	0	0	0	11	3	123	21
Hebburn Town	2023–24	NPL East Division	12	1	0	0	—		0	0	12	1
Hebburn Town	2024–25	NPL Premier Division	36	3	2	0	—		1 (Note: Appearance(s) in Durham Senior Cup)	1	39	3
Hebburn Town	2025–26	NPL Premier Division	2	0	0	0	—		0	0	2	0
Hebburn Town	Total		50	4	2	0	0	0	1	0	53	4
Newcastle Blue Star	2025–26	Northern League Division One	1	0	1	0	—		1 (Note: Appearance(s) in FA Vase)	1	3	1
Ashington	2025–26	NPL East Division	22	0	0	0	—		1	0	23	0
Easington Colliery	2025–26	Northern League Division One	2	0	0	0	—		0	0	2	0
Career total			493	80	25	2	10	2	29	6	555	90

== Honours ==
Carlisle United

- Football League Trophy: 2010–11

Forest Green Rovers

- National League play-offs: 2017

Hebburn Town

- Northern Premier League Division One East: 2023–24
