= David Amoo =

English footballer

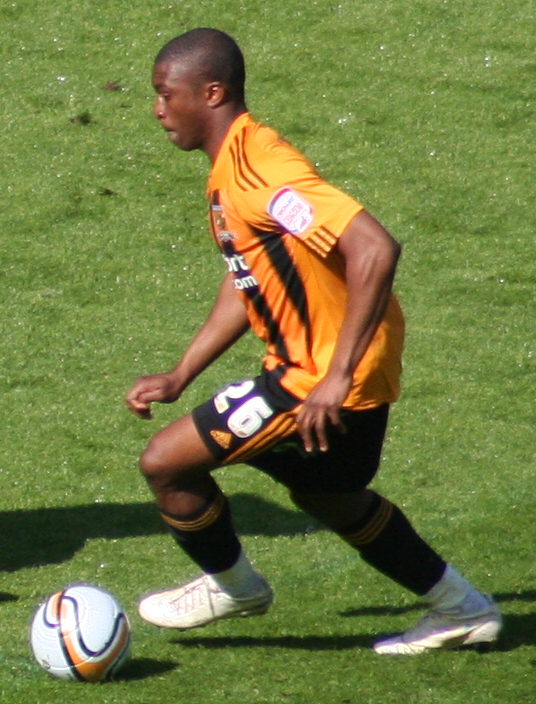
- Amoo playing for Hull City in 2011

Personal information
- Full name: David Oluwaseun Segun Amoo
- Date of birth: 13 April 1991 (age 35)
- Place of birth: Southwark, London, England
- Height: 1.78 m (5 ft 10 in)
- Positions: Winger; forward

Youth career
- 2003–2007: Millwall
- 2007–2010: Liverpool

Senior career*
Years	Team	Apps	(Gls)
2010–2012	Liverpool	0	(0)
2011	→ Milton Keynes Dons (loan)	3	(0)
2011	→ Hull City (loan)	7	(1)
2011–2012	→ Bury (loan)	27	(4)
2012–2013	Preston North End	17	(0)
2013	Tranmere Rovers	11	(1)
2013–2015	Carlisle United	70	(13)
2015–2017	Partick Thistle	62	(6)
2017–2019	Cambridge United	67	(7)
2019–2022	Port Vale	85	(7)
2022–2023	Stevenage	5	(0)
2023	Crewe Alexandra	7	(0)
2023–2024	Ebbsfleet United	10	(0)
2024	→ Welling United (loan)	9	(1)
2025–202?	Irish		
- * Club domestic league appearances and goals

David Oluwaseun Segun Amoo (born 13 April 1991) is an English former professional footballer who played as a winger.

Amoo began his career at Liverpool, making his debut in the UEFA Europa League in July 2010. He spent the 2010–11 and 2011–12 seasons on loan at Milton Keynes Dons, Hull City and Bury, before signing with Preston North End in May 2012. He moved on to Tranmere Rovers in January 2013. He joined Carlisle United in June 2013. He would win the club's Player of the Year award for the 2013–14 season, though Carlisle were relegated out of League One. He moved north of the border to play for Scottish Premiership club Partick Thistle in July 2015. After two seasons in Scotland, he returned south and joined Cambridge United in May 2017. He left Cambridge in favour of a move to Port Vale in July 2019. He helped the club to win promotion out of League Two via the play-offs in 2022. He joined Stevenage in August 2022 and moved on to Crewe Alexandra five months later. He joined non-League side Ebbsfleet United in June 2023 and was loaned to Welling United in March 2024. He came out of retirement to play for Dubai club Irish in February 2025.

== Career ==
=== Liverpool ===
Amoo played for Millwall as a youth, scoring nine goals in 20 games for the under-18s in the 2006–07 season. He left London at 16 years of age to sign for Liverpool in July 2007. He was in the Liverpool Academy squad for the FA Youth Cup final in 2009 when they lost 6–2 to the Arsenal Academy. He signed a new two-year contract with Liverpool in 2010, having successfully worked his way through the reserves to train with the first-team at Melwood in 2009. He was named in Liverpool's 2010–11 UEFA Europa League Third qualifying round squad for a match on 28 July 2010, and made his debut for the club the following day, starting in a 2–0 away win in a tie against FK Rabotnički at the Philip II Arena in Skopje, Macedonia. However, Kenny Dalglish replaced Roy Hodgson as manager in January 2011, and felt that Amoo was not strong enough to compete for a first-team place for the "Reds".

On 25 January 2011, he joined League One club Milton Keynes Dons on a one-month loan, and made his Football League debut for the Dons later that day as a 65th-minute substitute against Leyton Orient. He failed to break into Karl Robinson's first-team however, and made just two further substitute appearances at Stadium MK before returning to Anfield on 23 February. On 28 February, he joined Championship side Hull City on loan until the end of the 2010–11 season. He made his "Tigers" debut coming on as a replacement for Jay Simpson in a 1–0 win at Nottingham Forest on 5 March. He scored his first goal in senior football in a 1–1 draw at Queens Park Rangers on 25 April. Unable to break into Nigel Pearson's first-team, he made one start and six substitute appearances during his time at the KC Stadium.

On 23 September 2011, Amoo joined League One side Bury on a one-month loan deal. He made his debut for the "Shakers" the next day, coming on as a substitute for Mike Jones in a 0–0 draw with Milton Keynes Dons at Gigg Lane. On 1 October, he scored his first goal for Bury, a glancing header on 67 minutes to give Bury the lead in a 3–1 victory over Yeovil Town. His performance at Bury earned him praise from teammate Peter Sweeney and manager Richie Barker extended Amoo's loan, initially until 1 January and then eventually until the end of the 2011–12 season. He scored his second Bury goal in a 1–0 win over Preston North End on 26 November. Amoo then scored two goals in two matches, in defeats to Exeter City and Milton Keynes Dons. Throughout the season, Amoo made 27 league appearances for the club, scoring four goals, and missed a combined ten games from separate injuries.

=== Preston North End ===
Amoo agreed to join Preston North End in May 2012 when his contract expired with Liverpool on 1 July. He made his debut for the "Lilywhites" on the opening day of the 2012–13 season, coming on as a substitute for David Buchanan 56 minutes into a 0–0 draw with Colchester United at Deepdale. His first goal for the club came on 3 November, in a 3–0 victory over Yeovil in the FA Cup. After making only one start, with the rest of his appearances coming from off the bench, Amoo was linked with a move to League One rivals Tranmere Rovers, but manager Graham Westley refused to sell him. Amoo did however, leave Preston in January 2013 when his contract was cancelled by mutual consent.

=== Tranmere Rovers ===
On 9 January 2013, Amoo joined Tranmere Rovers on a contract to run until the end of the 2012–13 season. Amoo expressed happiness at getting a second chance to join Rovers after having chosen Preston ahead of Tranmere the previous year. He scored on his debut for the "Whites" two days later, in a 2–0 win over Crawley Town at Prenton Park. However, he found his first-team opportunities at the club were limited. Amoo was among five players to be released by manager Ronnie Moore at the end of the season.

=== Carlisle United ===
On 13 June 2013, Amoo signed a two-year deal with Carlisle United, becoming the "Cumbrians" first summer signing. Following the move, Amoo said he was motivated to join the club to link up with manager Greg Abbott. He scored on his debut at Brunton Park on 3 August, in a 5–1 defeat to Leyton Orient on the opening game of the season. He went on to score a brace in the League Cup four days later against Blackburn Rovers. He scored again in the next round of the League Cup, in a 5–2 defeat by Leicester City. Between 21 September and 5 October, Amoo scored three goals in three games against Stevenage, Notts County and Shrewsbury Town. Amoo scored and provided an assist, in a 4–1 win against his former club, Tranmere Rovers, on 14 December. He then scored his second brace for the "Blues" in a 2–1 win over Peterborough United on 29 December. He scored his eighth of the season, in a 1–1 draw against another former club, Milton Keynes Dons, on 28 January. However, Amoo struggled to score more goals throughout the 2013–14 season, as the club were relegated to League Two after finishing 22nd under new manager Graham Kavanagh. Nevertheless, Amoo was the club's top-scorer with 11 goals in all competitions and was named as the club's Player of the Season and Players' Player of the Season.

Amoo suffered an ankle injury in the opening game of the 2014–15 season. He made his return from injury against Cambridge United on 30 August and then scored two goals in two games against Mansfield Town and Tranmere Rovers. Amoo went on to add three more goals against Newport County, Morecambe and AFC Wimbledon. However, his season ended with five goals in 27 appearances after a groin sustained during a match against Northampton Town on 17 March kept him out for the entire season. On 4 May 2015, Amoo was among eight players to be released by manager Keith Curle.

=== Partick Thistle ===
Amoo joined Scottish Premiership side Partick Thistle on a one-year deal on 1 July 2015. Amoo scored his first goal for the "Jags" in a 2–1 defeat to Motherwell on 26 September. He scored six goals in 40 appearances over the course of the 2015–16 season and was given a new one-year contract by Alan Archibald in May. Restricted to 14 league starts during the 2016–17 season, he left Firhill Stadium after being released in May 2017.

=== Cambridge United ===
On 24 May 2017, Amoo signed a one-year deal with League Two side Cambridge United. He started just six league games for the "U's" in the 2017–18 season, though claimed two goals in victories over Crewe Alexandra and Port Vale at the Abbey Stadium. He struggled to play two consecutive games due to various injury problems, leading manager Shaun Derry to say that "I've read, heard, listened, ultimately that is the frustration of David Amoo". He was given a new contract by new manager Joe Dunne, though his injury problems continued into the summer and into pre-season. His form and fitness improved following the appointment of Colin Calderwood as manager in December and he ended the 2018–19 campaign with five goals in 49 appearances. He was offered a new contract by United in May 2019.

=== Port Vale ===
On 8 July 2019, Amoo left Cambridge and signed a one-year contract with League Two rivals Port Vale; manager John Askey had made signing a winger a top priority after the "Valiants" recorded the division's lowest goals scored tally the previous season. Amoo said that centre-back Leon Legge, his former captain at Cambridge, convinced him to come to Vale Park. He scored on his home debut on 10 August to secure 1–1 draw with Northampton Town. He soon built a connection with supporters, who would cry 'Amooooo!' in tribute to the winger, though those not connected with the club sometimes would mistake the cry for booing. Lapses in form by mid-season did though cause heckling from a minority of Vale supporters, leading Askey to praise his partnership with right-back James Gibbons and comment that "in the majority of games I think he has done well". He signed a new two-year contract after he ended the 2019–20 campaign with five goals in 37 appearances.

Amoo struggled with injuries at the start of the 2020–21 season but still managed to be one of the team's main attacking threats until he was sidelined with a hamstring injury in January. Darrell Clarke was appointed as manager the following month. Amoo failed to start a game under the new manager before ending the campaign with one goal from 13 starts and 16 substitute appearances. Speaking in August 2021, Clarke stated that "I do see David Amoo more as a centre forward now". He was dropped from the bench the following month, though Clarke said that "it is harsh because he did very well at Bolton [in the EFL Trophy]". From his more familiar right-wing position he scored and provided an assist during his seventh league substitute appearance of the campaign after Clarke reverted to a 4–2–4 formation in the second half of a 4–1 win at Crawley Town. He was an unused substitute as Vale secured promotion out of the play-offs with victory over Mansfield Town in the final at Wembley Stadium. However, he was released upon the expiry of his contract in June 2022; David Flitcroft, the club's director of football, stated that "the way that he carried himself both on and off the pitch was exemplary".

=== Stevenage ===
On 22 August 2022, Amoo signed for League Two club Stevenage, becoming manager Steve Evans's 12th signing of the summer. He made 13 appearances for the club, including just three starts, scoring one goal.

=== Crewe Alexandra ===
On 19 January 2023, Amoo joined fellow League Two club Crewe Alexandra on a contract until the end of the 2022–23 season, having agreed on the termination of his Stevenage contract. He made his Crewe debut in a 1–1 League Two draw with Stockport County at Gresty Road on 31 January. He picked up an ankle injury the following month that saw him ruled out of action for four weeks and he ended the campaign with seven appearances to his name at Crewe. Crewe released him at the end of the season.

=== Ebbsfleet United ===
On 28 June 2023, Amoo joined National League club Ebbsfleet United. Manager Dennis Kutrieb was struck by the player's humility. On 14 March 2024, Amoo joined National League South club Welling United on loan for the remainder of the 2023–24 season. On 26 April, Ebbsfleet confirmed that Amoo would leave the club at the end of his contract in June. He came out of retirement to play for Dubai club Irish in February 2025.

== Style of play ==
Primarily a winger, he uses his natural pace to beat defenders as a former sprinter in his youth. Speaking in July 2019, Port Vale manager John Askey commented that "David is somebody who can go past his full back, he has a lot a lot of pace. Hopefully we can work on his finishing". He is also able to play as a striker.

== Personal life ==
Amoo is of Nigerian descent. He represented London as a sprinter in the English Schools National Track and Field Championships. He grew up supporting Chelsea and watched all the Chelsea games.

== Career statistics ==
As of match played 20 April 2024

Appearances and goals by club, season and competition
Club	Season	League			National cup (Note: Includes FA Cup, Scottish Cup)		League cup (Note: Includes Football League Cup, Scottish League Cup)		Other		Total	
Club	Season	Division	Apps	Goals	Apps	Goals	Apps	Goals	Apps	Goals	Apps	Goals
Liverpool	2010–11	Premier League	0	0	0	0	0	0	1 (Note: Appearance in the Europa League)	0	1	0
Milton Keynes Dons (loan)	2010–11	League One	3	0	—		—		—		3	0
Hull City (loan)	2010–11	Championship	7	1	—		—		—		7	1
Bury (loan)	2011–12	League One	27	4	1	0	—		0	0	28	4
Preston North End	2012–13	League One	17	0	2	1	2	0	3 (Note: Appearances in the Football League Trophy)	0	24	1
Tranmere Rovers	2012–13	League One	11	1	—		—		—		11	1
Carlisle United	2013–14	League One	43	8	4	0	2	3	2	0	51	11
Carlisle United	2014–15	League Two	27	5	1	0	0	0	0	0	28	5
Carlisle United	Total		70	13	5	0	2	3	2	0	79	16
Partick Thistle	2015–16	Scottish Premiership	37	5	2	1	1	0	—		40	6
Partick Thistle	2016–17	Scottish Premiership	25	1	2	0	4	1	—		31	2
Partick Thistle	Total		62	6	4	1	5	1	0	0	71	8
Cambridge United	2017–18	League Two	24	2	1	0	1	0	1 (Note: Appearance in the EFL Trophy)	0	27	2
Cambridge United	2018–19	League Two	43	5	1	0	1	0	4	0	49	5
Cambridge United	Total		67	7	2	0	2	0	5	0	76	7
Port Vale	2019–20	League Two	32	4	3	0	1	0	1	1	37	5
Port Vale	2020–21	League Two	26	1	1	0	0	0	2	0	29	1
Port Vale	2021–22	League Two	27	2	3	0	1	0	4	2	35	4
Port Vale	Total		85	7	7	0	2	0	7	3	101	10
Stevenage	2022–23	League Two	5	0	2	0	2	0	4	1	13	1
Crewe Alexandra	2022–23	League Two	7	0	—		—		—		7	0
Ebbsfleet United	2023–24	National League	10	0	2	0	—		1 (Note: Appearance in the FA Trophy)	0	13	0
Welling United (loan)	2023–24	National League South	9	1	—		—		—		9	1
Career total			380	40	25	2	15	4	23	4	443	50

== Honours ==
Port Vale

- EFL League Two play-offs: 2022

Individual

- Carlisle United Player of the Year: 2013–14
