= David Symington =

English footballer

Personal information
- Full name: David Alexander Symington
- Date of birth: 28 January 1994 (age 32)
- Place of birth: Workington, England
- Height: 5 ft 9 in (1.75 m)
- Positions: Midfielder; defender

Youth career
- 2010–2012: Carlisle United

Senior career*
Years	Team	Apps	(Gls)
2012–2015	Carlisle United	68	(4)
2015	→ Workington (loan)	1	(0)
2015–2016	Barrow	20	(1)
2016–2026	Workington		
- * Club domestic league appearances and goals as of 11:42, 22 May 2026 (UTC)

David Symington (born 28 January 1994) is an English former footballer, who played as a defender or midfielder.

== Career ==
=== Carlisle United ===
Symington began his career with Carlisle United since 2010 and made his professional debut at the age of 18 on 11 August 2012 in a 1–0 win against Accrington Stanley in the League Cup. He scored his first goal for the club on 28 August in a 2–1 win against Ipswich Town in the League Cup. His display led to Sympington signing a three-year contract with the club, keeping him until 2015.

He scored his first league goal on 27 October, in a 4–2 defeat at home to Bournemouth. He scored in the following game on 3 November, which was a 4–2 win against Ebbsfleet United on his FA Cup debut. His second league goal for the club came later in the month of November, scoring in a 3–1 defeat to Doncaster Rovers at Brunton Park. On 26 January 2013, he scored his first goal of the new year in a 1–1 draw at home to Scunthorpe United, scoring a superb free-kick just three minutes after coming off the bench. After the match, Symington said his practice on free kick was the main factor of him scoring that goal, though he was loss for words. The goal also named him for the Goal of the Season. However, Symington ended his season after sustaining an injury that kept him out for the remainder of the season.

Ahead of the 2013–14 season saw Symington hoping to get his chance after regaining his fitness and sharpness. Symington made a good start to the season when he helped the club get through to the Football League Cup after converting the winning penalty against Blackburn Rovers. However, this season saw Symington being placed on the substitution bench for many matches, as well as, suffering a thigh injury. Symington only scored one goal during the season against Crewe Alexandra on 26 November 2013. The season further saw Symington switched position to a right-back "following a series of injuries across the Carlisle United back line". Despite this, Symington was named CST Community Player of the Year.

The 2014–15 season saw Symington appeared in the first ten out of thirteen appearances at the start of the season before losing his first team place under the management of Keith Curle. To get regular first team football, Symington joined Workington on loan until 14 March 2015. However, his loan spell at Workington was short-lived after suffering a freak injury on his debut. Upon learning about this, Manager Curle said the situation of Symington's injury is bad. It later confirmed that Symington was out for the remainder of the 2014–15 season. On 4 May 2015, Symington was among eight players to be released by Carlisle.

=== Barrow ===
After impressing during a trial period, Symington joined Barrow in the summer of 2015 on noncontract terms. On 15 April 2016 he left the club to pursue a career outside of football.

=== Workington ===
In the summer of 2016, Symington changed jobs allowing him to be available on a Saturday so he decided to get back into football. On 5 July 2016, Symington featured for Workington in a friendly match against Whitehaven and two days later he agreed terms with the West Cumbrian club ahead of the new Northern Premier League season. He made his debut for the 'Reds' on 13 August 2016, against Rushall Olympic. He scored his first goal for the club on 13 September 2016 against Frickley Athletic and netted a hat trick on 14 January 2017 against Mickleover Sports. He was part of the Workington side that lost 3–2 in the Play off simi final against Stourbridge on 24 April 2017. In the Cumberland Senior Cup final on 3 May 2017, Symington scored the winning goal late in extra time as Workington beat Penrith 2–1.

After eleven years with Workington, he announced his retirement in May 2026.

== Career statistics ==
As of match played 6 September 2014.

Club	Season	League		FA Cup		League Cup		Other		Total	
Club	Season	Apps	Goals	Apps	Goals	Apps	Goals	Apps	Goals	Apps	Goals
Carlisle United	2012–13	31	3	2	1	3	1	0	0	36	5
Carlisle United	2013–14	31	1	4	0	2	0	2	0	39	1
Carlisle United	2014–15	12	0	0	0	1	0	1	0	8	0
Career total		68	4	6	1	6	1	3	0	83	6
