= Bubb =

Family name

Bubb is a surname. Notable people with the surname include:

- Adrian Bubb (fl. 1980s), rugby league footballer
- Alvin Bubb (born 1980), Grenadian footballer and cousin of Byron
- Bradley Bubb (born 1988), Grenadian international footballer
- Byron Bubb (born 1981), Grenadian footballer and cousin of Alvin
- Clive Bubb (1936–2004), Australian politician
- Ernest Bubb (1884–1946), Australian cricketer
- Frank W. Bubb Sr. (1892–1961), scientist and a mathematician
- George Dodington, 1st Baron Melcombe, born George Bubb (1691–1762), English politician and diarist
- Henry Bubb (1907–1989), American businessman
- J. G. Bubb (1782–1853), sculptor of the Victorian era
- Les Bubb, mime artist from the UK
- Roy Bubb (1900–1965), Australian cricketer
- Stephen Bubb (born 1952)

== See also ==
- Melbury Bubb, hamlet in Dorset, England
- Bubba
- Bubble (disambiguation)
- Bub (disambiguation)
