= 1899–1900 in English football =

Football in England
- Season: 1899–1900

Men's football
- First Division: Aston Villa
- Second Division: The Wednesday
- Southern League: Tottenham Hotspur
- Northern League: Darlington
- The Combination: Chirk AAA
- Western League: Bristol Rovers
- FA Cup: Bury
- Sheriff of London Charity Shield: Shared between Aston Villa and Queen's Park

The 1899–1900 season was the 29th season of competitive football in England.

== Events ==
Chesterfield and Middlesbrough replaced Blackpool and Darwen in the Football League.

Glossop debuted in the First Division, becoming the smallest town ever to compete in the highest English football division. The team finished in bottom place and was relegated, becoming the first of six clubs that so far have only completed one season in the top flight. (Note: The others are Leyton Orient in 1962–63, Northampton Town in 1965–66, Carlisle United in 1974–75, Swindon Town in 1993–94 and Barnsley in 1997–98)

== Honours ==
Competition	Winner
First Division	Aston Villa (5*)
Second Division	The Wednesday
FA Cup	Bury (1)
Home Championship	Scotland

Notes = Number in parentheses is the times that club has won that honour. * indicates new record for competition

== League tables ==
=== First Division ===
Pos	Team	Pld	W	D	L	GF	GA	GAv	Pts	Relegation
1	Aston Villa (C)	34	22	6	6	77	35	2.200	50	
2	Sheffield United	34	18	12	4	63	33	1.909	48	
3	Sunderland	34	19	3	12	50	35	1.429	41	
4	Wolverhampton Wanderers	34	15	9	10	48	37	1.297	39	
5	Newcastle United	34	13	10	11	53	43	1.233	36	
6	Derby County	34	14	8	12	45	43	1.047	36	
7	Manchester City	34	13	8	13	50	44	1.136	34	
8	Nottingham Forest	34	13	8	13	56	55	1.018	34	
9	Stoke	34	13	8	13	37	45	0.822	34	
10	Liverpool	34	14	5	15	49	45	1.089	33	
11	Everton	34	13	7	14	47	49	0.959	33	
12	Bury	34	13	6	15	40	44	0.909	32	
13	West Bromwich Albion	34	11	8	15	43	51	0.843	30	
14	Blackburn Rovers	34	13	4	17	49	61	0.803	30	
15	Notts County	34	9	11	14	46	60	0.767	29	
16	Preston North End	34	12	4	18	38	48	0.792	28	
17	Burnley (R)	34	11	5	18	34	54	0.630	27	Relegation to the Second Division
18	Glossop (R)	34	4	10	20	31	74	0.419	18	Relegation to the Second Division

Source: World Football
Rules for classification: 1) Points; 2) Goal average; 3) Goals scored
(C) Champions; (R) Relegated

=== Second Division ===
Pos	Team	Pld	W	D	L	GF	GA	GAv	Pts	Promotion or relegation
1	The Wednesday (C, P)	34	25	4	5	84	22	3.818	54	Promotion to the First Division
2	Bolton Wanderers (P)	34	22	8	4	79	25	3.160	52	Promotion to the First Division
3	Small Heath	34	20	6	8	78	38	2.053	46	
4	Newton Heath	34	20	4	10	63	27	2.333	44	
5	Leicester Fosse	34	17	9	8	53	36	1.472	43	
6	Grimsby Town	34	17	6	11	67	46	1.457	40	
7	Chesterfield Town	34	16	6	12	65	60	1.083	38	
8	Woolwich Arsenal	34	16	4	14	61	43	1.419	36	
9	Lincoln City	34	14	8	12	46	43	1.070	36	
10	New Brighton Tower	34	13	9	12	66	58	1.138	35	
11	Burslem Port Vale	34	14	6	14	39	49	0.796	34	
12	Walsall	34	12	8	14	50	55	0.909	32	
13	Gainsborough Trinity	34	9	7	18	47	75	0.627	25	
14	Middlesbrough	34	8	8	18	39	69	0.565	24	
15	Burton Swifts	34	9	6	19	43	84	0.512	24	
16	Barnsley	34	8	7	19	46	79	0.582	23	Re-elected
17	Luton Town (R)	34	5	8	21	40	75	0.533	18	Failed re-election and demoted to the Southern League
18	Loughborough	34	1	6	27	18	100	0.180	8	Failed re-election and folded

Rules for classification: 1) Points; 2) Goal average; 3) Goals scored
(C) Champions; (P) Promoted; (R) Relegated

== National team ==
For the last round of international matches in the Victorian era, the England national football team played all three matches in the 1900 British Home Championship away from home.

=== Ireland ===
For the match against Ireland, played at Lansdowne Road, Dublin on 17 March 1900, the England team were confidently expecting an easy win after five successive victories, including winning 13–2 the previous year. The England selectors chose five debutantes, including four of the five forwards. Dan Cunliffe of Southern League Portsmouth, made his solitary England appearance at inside right, with his Portsmouth teammate Matt Reilly in goal for the Irish. Another Southern League player, Archie Turner of Southampton played the first of his two internationals at outside right, while on the left were Charlie Sagar of Bury and Fred Priest of Sheffield United, with the experienced Gilbert Smith in the centre. Priest's Sheffield United colleague, Harry Johnson played the first of his six internationals at Right-half.

In the event, the game was far more difficult than expected, with England only managing a 2–0 victory, with goals from debutantes Johnson and Sagar.

=== Wales ===
Nine days later, the England team travelled to Cardiff to compete against Wales with four new players. Arthur Chadwick of Southampton represented the Southern League, playing the first of his two internationals at centre half. The other three debutantes were up front, with Corinthians Geoffrey Plumpton Wilson and Tip Foster, lining up alongside their club captain, G. O. Smith, and Alf Spouncer of Nottingham Forest making his only England appearance on the left wing.

While the visitors were expected to win with ease, the Welsh "fought magnificently" to hold the English to a draw with Billy Meredith's 55th-minute strike cancelling out Wilson's third-minute goal.

=== Scotland ===
As Scotland had defeated both the Welsh and Irish by large scores, England needed a victory at Celtic Park if they were to retain the British Home Championship. They made only three changes from the side that had defeated the Welsh, bringing in Jack Plant of Bury to replace Alf Spouncer on the left, and recalling Ernest Needham (replacing Howard Spencer in defence) and Steve Bloomer in place of Tip Foster.

Scotland were "determined to succeed against the visitors" following defeats in the two previous meetings. In front of a world record crowd of 63,000, the Scots did not disappoint their supporters with Robert McColl scoring a hat trick (his third for Scotland), with Bloomer scoring England's consolation. Scotland thus defeated all three of their competitors, enabling them to take the championship.

Date	Venue	Opponents	Score*	Comp	England scorers
17 March 1900	Lansdowne Road, Dublin (A)	Ireland	2–0	BHC	Harry Johnson (Sheffield United) (12 mins), Charlie Sagar (Bury) (16 mins)
26 March 1900	Cardiff Arms Park, Cardiff (A)	Wales	1–1	BHC	Geoffrey Wilson (Corinthian) (3 mins)
7 April 1900	Celtic Park, Glasgow (A)	Scotland	1–4	BHC	Steve Bloomer (Derby County) (35 mins)

* England score given first

Key

- A = Away match
- BHC = British Home Championship
