= List of Leyton Orient F.C. seasons =

This is a list of all the seasons played by Leyton Orient Football Club in English football. The club was formed in 1881 as Glyn Cricket Club, and started a football section named Orient Football Club in 1888. Friendly matches were played against local sides until the club was elected into the Clapton & District League for the 1893–94 season.

Leyton Orient is the second oldest football club in London, behind Fulham, and was elected to The Football League for the 1905–06 season. The club has undergone a number of name changes during its history: from Orient to Clapton Orient in 1898; to Leyton Orient in 1946; a reversion to Orient in 1966, then a return to the Leyton Orient name in 1987. The club has reached the top flight of English football once in its history, a single season in Division One in 1962–63 which ended in relegation. Leyton Orient's best performance in the FA Cup was in reaching the semi-final stage in 1977–78.

This list includes the abandoned 1939–40 season and the unofficial Second World War leagues.

== Seasons ==
Season	League									FA Cup	League Cup	Other		Average attendance (Note: Average attendance figures are for home matches in the league only)
Season	Division	P	W	D	L	GF	GA	Pts	Pos	FA Cup	League Cup	Other		Average attendance
1893–94 (Note: As Orient F.C.)	C&DL	?	?	?	?	?	?	?	3rd					
1894–95	C&DL	12	9	1	2	46	10	19	1st					
1895–96	C&DL	13	6	2	5	17	13	14	4th					
1896–97	LL Div 3	12	7	2	3	27	22	16	2nd					
1897–98	LL Div 2	18	7	0	11	30	45	14	7th					
1898–99 (Note: As Clapton Orient F.C.)	LL Div 1	16	7	2	7	29	32	16	5th					
1899–1900	LL Div 1	18	4	5	9	40	50	13	6th					
1900–01	LL Div 1	20	8	2	10	36	31	18	7th					
1901–02	LL Div 1	18	8	3	7	49	37	19	5th					
1902–03	LL Div 1	18	6	5	7	23	17	17	7th					
1903–04	LL Div 1	20	6	6	8	26	33	18	6th					
1904–05	LL Div 1	18	6	3	9	37	46	15	7th	4QR				
1904–05	SFL Div 2	22	7	7	8	47	56	21	8th	4QR				1,971
Elected to the Football League
1905–06	Div 2	38	7	7	24	35	78	21	20th	R1				3,916
1906–07	Div 2	38	11	8	19	45	67	30	17th					6,784
1907–08	Div 2	38	11	10	17	40	65	32	14th	4QR				7,413
1908–09	Div 2	34	12	9	17	37	49	33	15th	R1				10,373
1909–10	Div 2	38	12	6	20	37	60	30	16th	R1				8,766
1910–11	Div 2	38	19	7	12	44	35	45	4th	R1				10,968
1911–12	Div 2	38	21	3	14	61	44	45	4th	R1		London Challenge Cup	W	12,016
1912–13	Div 2	38	10	14	14	34	47	34	14th	R1				11,142
1913–14	Div 2	38	16	11	11	47	35	43	6th	R2				13,424
1914–15	Div 2	38	16	9	13	50	48	41	9th	R1				7,975
No competitive football was played between 1915 and 1919 due to World War I
1919–20	Div 2	42	16	6	20	51	59	38	15th	R1				14,385
1920–21	Div 2	42	16	13	13	43	42	45	7th	R1		London Challenge Cup	R/U	18,166
1921–22	Div 2	42	15	9	18	43	50	39	15th	R1				16,093
1922–23	Div 2	42	12	12	18	40	50	36	19th	R1				14,789
1923–24	Div 2	42	14	15	13	40	36	43	10th	R1				17,404
1924–25	Div 2	42	14	12	16	42	42	40	11th	R1		London Challenge Cup	R/U	16,914
1925–26	Div 2	42	12	9	21	50	65	33	20th	QF				12,757
1926–27	Div 2	42	12	7	23	60	96	31	20th	R3		London Challenge Cup	R/U	12,929
1927–28	Div 2	42	11	12	19	55	85	34	20th	R3				13,262
1928–29	Div 2	42	12	8	22	45	72	32	22nd	R4				12,172
1929–30	Div 3S	42	14	13	15	55	62	41	12th	R4				9,967
1930–31	Div 3S	42	14	7	21	63	91	35	19th	R1				5,471
1931–32	Div 3S	42	12	11	19	77	90	35	16th	R2				7,593
1932–33	Div 3S	42	8	13	21	59	93	29	20th	R1				6,064
1933–34	Div 3S	42	16	10	16	75	69	42	11th	R3		Div 3S Cup	R2	9,119
1934–35	Div 3S	42	15	10	17	65	65	40	14th	R2		Div 3S Cup	R1	8,652
1935–36	Div 3S	42	16	6	20	55	61	38	14th	R4		Div 3S Cup	R1	7,586
1936–37	Div 3S	42	14	15	13	52	52	43	12th	R2		Div 3S Cup	R3	8,027
1937–38	Div 3S	42	13	7	22	42	61	33	19th	R2		Div 3S Cup	R1	7,835
1938–39	Div 3S	42	11	13	18	53	55	35	20th	R2		Div 3S Cup	R2	7,943
1939–40 (Note: The 1939–40 season was abandoned in early September and all results annulled, after only three matches had been played; Leyton Orient were thirteenth in the table at the time.)	Div 3S	3	0	3	0	3	3	3	13th					8,515
The Football League was suspended between 1939 and 1946 due to World War II, and regional league competitions were organised
1939–40	Lge South A	18	5	3	10	28	60	13	8th			League South Cup	R2	4,589
1939–40	Lge South D	18	7	3	8	33	45	17	5th			League South Cup	R2	3,099
1940–41	South Region	15	1	3	11	11	19	0.287	34th			League War Cup	R1	710
1940–41	London Cup	10	0	1	9	9	59	1	6th			League War Cup	R1	870
1941–42	London Lge	30	6	4	20	42	94	16	15th					2,613
1941–42	London Cup	6	1	0	5	10	19	2						5,367
1942–43	London Lge	28	11	5	12	54	72	27	11th					3,050
1942–43	League Cup	6	1	2	3	6	14	4						3,769
1943–44	London Lge	30	4	3	23	32	87	11	17th					2,863
1943–44	League Cup	6	1	0	5	7	27	2						2,333
1944–45	London Lge	30	5	7	18	39	86	17	18th					3,340
1944–45	London Cup	6	0	2	4	5	16	2						4,300
1945–46 (Note: Division Three South was divided into two sections, north and south. Clapton Orient played in the north section. The league competition was held during the first half of the season, and the cup competition over the second half.)	Div 3S	20	5	6	9	28	42	16	8th	R1				4,891
1945–46	Div 3S Cup	16	6	3	7	22	31	15	7th	R1				9,478
The Football League resumed as normal from the 1946–47 season
1946–47 (Note: As Leyton Orient F.C.)	Div 3S	42	12	8	22	54	75	32	19th	R1				10,048
1947–48	Div 3S	42	13	10	19	51	73	36	17th	R1				13,345
1948–49	Div 3S	42	11	12	19	58	80	34	19th	R2				12,444
1949–50	Div 3S	42	12	11	19	53	85	35	18th	R1				12,587
1950–51	Div 3S	46	15	8	23	53	75	38	19th	R1				11,914
1951–52	Div 3S	46	16	9	21	55	68	41	18th	R5				11,487
1952–53	Div 3S	46	16	10	20	68	73	42	14th	R1				10,562
1953–54	Div 3S	46	18	11	17	79	73	47	11th	QF				11,218
1954–55	Div 3S	46	26	9	11	89	47	61	2nd	R2				15,216
1955–56	Div 3S	46	29	8	9	106	49	66	1st	R4		Southern Floodlit Cup	R2	16,061
1956–57	Div 2	42	15	10	17	66	84	40	15th	R3		Southern Floodlit Cup	R1	17,524
1957–58	Div 2	42	18	5	19	77	79	41	12th	R4		Southern Floodlit Cup	R1	14,839
1958–59	Div 2	42	14	8	20	71	78	36	17th	R3		Southern Floodlit Cup	R1	13,323
1959–60	Div 2	42	15	14	13	76	61	44	10th	R3		Southern Floodlit Cup	R3	13,250
1960–61	Div 2	42	14	8	20	55	78	36	19th	R5	R2			10,539
1961–62	Div 2	42	22	10	10	69	40	54	2nd	R4	R2			14,751
1962–63	Div 1	42	6	9	27	37	81	21	22nd (Note: Highest League finish.)	R5	R5			16,406
1963–64	Div 2	42	13	10	19	54	72	36	16th	R4	R2			10,359
1964–65	Div 2	42	12	11	19	50	72	35	19th	R3	R3			8,920
1965–66	Div 2	42	5	13	24	38	80	23	22nd	R3	R2			7,378
1966–67 (Note: As Orient F.C.)	Div 3	46	13	18	15	58	68	44	14th	R2	R1			5,981
1967–68	Div 3	46	12	17	17	46	62	41	19th	R4	R1			4,715
1968–69	Div 3	46	14	14	18	51	58	42	18th	R1	R3			5,695
1969–70	Div 3	46	25	12	9	67	36	62	1st	R1	R1			11,369
1970–71	Div 2	42	9	16	17	29	51	34	17th	R4	R1			9,119
1971–72	Div 2	42	14	9	19	50	61	37	17th	QF	R1	London Challenge Cup	W	9,530
1972–73	Div 2	42	12	12	18	49	53	36	15th	R3	R2	London Challenge Cup	W	6,449
1973–74	Div 2	42	15	18	9	55	42	48	4th	R4	R3			11,793
1974–75	Div 2	42	11	20	11	28	39	42	12th	R3	R2	Texaco Cup	R1	7,605
1975–76	Div 2	42	13	14	15	37	39	40	13th	R3	R2			6,386
1976–77	Div 2	42	9	16	17	37	55	34	19th	R4	R3	Anglo-Scottish Cup	R/U	6,222
1977–78	Div 2	42	10	18	14	43	49	38	14th	SF	R3	Anglo-Scottish Cup	R1	8,400
1978–79	Div 2	42	15	10	17	51	51	40	11th	R4	R2	Anglo-Scottish Cup	R1	7,323
1979–80	Div 2	42	12	17	13	48	54	41	14th	R4	R2			7,245
1980–81	Div 2	42	13	12	17	52	56	38	17th	R3	R2	Anglo-Scottish Cup	R1	6,076
1981–82	Div 2	42	10	9	23	36	61	39 (Note: The 1981–82 season saw the introduction of three points for a win.)	22nd	R5	R1	FL Group Cup	R1	4,419
1982–83	Div 3	46	15	9	22	64	88	54	20th	R2	R1	FL Group Cup	R1	2,718
1983–84	Div 3	46	18	9	19	71	81	63	11th	R1	R1	Football League Trophy	R1	3,222
1984–85	Div 3	46	11	13	22	51	76	46	22nd	R4	R2	Football League Trophy	SthSF	2,640
1985–86	Div 4	46	20	12	14	79	64	72	5th	R4	R2	Football League Trophy	R2	2,629
1986–87	Div 4	46	20	9	17	64	61	69	7th	R3	R1	Football League Trophy	PR	2,857
1987–88 (Note: As Leyton Orient F.C.)	Div 4	46	19	12	15	85	63	69	8th	R4	R1	Football League Trophy	R1	3,933
1988–89	Div 4	46	21	12	13	86	50	75	6th (Note: Promoted via the Play-offs)	R2	R3	Football League Trophy	PR	3,794
1989–90	Div 3	46	16	10	20	52	56	58	14th	R1	R2	Football League Trophy	PRP/O	4,365
1990–91	Div 3	46	18	10	18	55	58	64	13th	R3	R3	Football League Trophy	PR	4,194
1991–92	Div 3	46	18	11	17	62	52	65	10th	R4	R2	Football League Trophy	SthSF	4,460
1992–93	Div 2 (Note: The 1992–93 season saw the introduction of the Premier League, so Division 2 was renamed Division 1, Division 3 was renamed Division 2 and Division 4 was renamed Division 3.)	46	21	9	16	69	53	72	7th	R2	R1	Football League Trophy	SthQF	5,377
1993–94	Div 2	46	14	14	18	57	71	56	18th	R2	R1	Football League Trophy	SthSF	4,237
1994–95	Div 2	46	6	8	32	30	75	26	24th	R2	R1	Football League Trophy	SthF	3,436
1995–96	Div 3	46	12	11	23	44	63	47	21st	R1	R1	Football League Trophy	R1	4,478
1996–97	Div 3	46	15	12	19	50	58	57	16th	R2	R1	Football League Trophy	R1	4,336
1997–98	Div 3	46	19	12	15	62	47	66 (Note: Leyton Orient deducted three points)	11th	R1	R2	Football League Trophy	R2	4,374
1998–99	Div 3	46	19	15	12	68	59	72	6th	R4	R2	Football League Trophy	R1	4,689
1999–2000	Div 3	46	13	13	20	47	52	52	19th	R1	R2	Football League Trophy	R1	4,355
2000–01	Div 3	46	20	15	11	59	51	75	5th	R3	R2	Football League Trophy	R2	4,633
2001–02	Div 3	46	13	13	20	55	71	52	18th	R4	R1	Football League Trophy	R1	4,540
2002–03	Div 3	46	14	11	21	51	61	53	18th	R1	R2	Football League Trophy	R2	4,257
2003–04	Div 3	46	13	14	19	48	65	53	19th	R2	R1	Football League Trophy	R1	4,157
2004–05	League 2 (Note: The 2004–05 season saw the rebranding of Divisions 1–3, so Division 1 became The Championship, Division 2 became League One and Division 3 became League Two.)	46	16	15	15	65	67	63	11th	R2	R1	Football League Trophy	SthSF	3,642
2005–06	League 2	46	22	15	9	67	51	81	3rd	R4	R1	Football League Trophy	R2	4,714
2006–07	League 1	46	12	15	19	61	77	51	20th	R2	R1	Football League Trophy	R2	4,828
2007–08	League 1	46	16	12	18	49	63	60	14th	R1	R2	Football League Trophy	R2	5,210
2008–09	League 1	46	15	11	20	45	57	56	14th	R3	R1	Football League Trophy	R2	4,692
2009–10	League 1	46	13	12	21	53	63	51	17th	R1	R2	Football League Trophy	SthQF	4,937
2010–11	League 1	46	19	13	14	71	62	70	7th	R5	R2	Football League Trophy	R2	4,582
2011–12	League 1	46	13	11	22	48	75	50	20th	R2	R3	Football League Trophy	R1	4,298
2012–13	League 1	46	21	8	17	55	48	71	7th	R3	R2	Football League Trophy	SthF	4,002
2013–14	League 1	46	25	11	10	85	45	86	3rd	R3	R2	Football League Trophy	SthQF	5,479
2014–15	League 1	46	12	13	21	59	69	49	23rd	R1	R3	Football League Trophy	SthSF	5,023
2015–16	League 2	46	19	12	15	60	61	69	8th	R2	R1	Football League Trophy	R1	5,332
2016–17	League 2	46	10	6	30	47	87	36	24th	R1	R1	Football League Trophy	R1	4,663
2017–18	National	46	16	12	18	58	56	60	13th (Note: Lowest League finish.)	R1		FA Trophy	R4	4,344
2018–19	National	46	25	14	7	73	35	89	1st	4QR		FA Trophy	R/U	5,317
2019–20	League 2	36	10	12	14	47	55	42	17th	R1	R1	Football League Trophy	R2	5,608
2020–21	League 2	46	17	10	19	53	55	61	11th	R1	R3	Football League Trophy	R2	75
2021–22	League 2	46	14	16	16	62	47	58	13th	R3	R1	Football League Trophy	R2	5,116
2022–23	League 2	46	26	13	7	61	34	91	1st	R1	R1	Football League Trophy	R1	7,841
2023–24	League 1	46	18	11	17	53	55	65	11th	R2	R1	Football League Trophy	R1	8,162
2024–25	League 1	46	24	6	16	72	48	78	6th	R4	R3	Football League Trophy	R3	7,890

== Key ==
- P = Played
- W = Games won
- D = Games drawn
- L = Games lost
- GF = Goals for
- GA = Goals against
- Pts = Points
- Pos = Final position
- C&DL = Clapham & District League
- LL = London League
- SFL = Southern Football League
- Div 1 = Football League First Division
- Div 2 = Football League Second Division
- Div 3 = Football League Third Division
- Div3S = Football League Third Division South
- Div 4 = Football League Fourth Division
- Lge 1 = Football League One
- Lge 2 = Football League Two
- PR = Preliminary Round
- PRP/O = Preliminary Round Play-off
- 4QR = 4th Qualifying Round
- R1 = Round 1
- R2 = Round 2
- R3 = Round 3
- R4 = Round 4
- R5 = Round 5
- QF = Quarter-finals
- SthQF = Southern Quarter-finals
- SF = Semi-finals
- SthSF = Southern Semi-finals
- SthF = Southern Final
- R/U = Runners-up
- W = Winners

Champions	Runners-up	Play-offs	Promoted	Relegated	Competition not entered	Competition not held
