= 1997–98 in English football =

Football in England
- Season: 1997–98

Men's football
- FA Premier League: Arsenal
- First Division: Nottingham Forest
- Second Division: Watford
- Third Division: Notts County
- Football Conference: Halifax Town
- FA Cup: Arsenal
- Football League Trophy: Grimsby Town
- League Cup: Chelsea
- Charity Shield: Manchester United

Women's football
- Premier League National Division: Everton
- Premier League Northern Division: Ilkeston Town
- Premier League Southern Division: Southampton Saints
- FA Women's Cup: Arsenal
- Premier League Cup: Arsenal

The 1997–98 season was the 118th season of competitive football in England.

== Overview ==
=== Premier League ===
Arsenal overhauled Manchester United's lead during the final weeks of the season to win the Premiership title. They added the FA Cup two weeks later to become only the second English club to repeat the double.

All three newly promoted teams – Bolton Wanderers, Barnsley and Crystal Palace – were relegated after just one season in the Premiership.

Everton endured their most difficult season for some 50 years. They finished 17th in the Premiership and only avoided relegation because they had a stronger goal difference than 18th-placed Bolton, although Bolton had a goal wrongfully disallowed against Everton in the first ever match played at The Reebok Stadium. Manager Howard Kendall's third reign at the helm came to an end soon afterwards and he was replaced by Walter Smith.

Leeds United and Blackburn Rovers made good progress in the Premiership and achieved UEFA Cup qualification.

=== Division One ===
Champions Nottingham Forest and runners-up Middlesbrough won promotion back to the Premiership at the first time of asking. Charlton Athletic won the playoffs to end an eight-year absence from the top flight.

Reading were relegated in bottom place. They were joined on the last day of the season by Manchester City and Stoke City. The blue half of Manchester endured relegation to the third tier of the English league for the first time in its history, despite beating also doomed Stoke 5–2 away on the last day of the season, but neither fans took lightly to relegation, as mass football violence outside outshone the match. Portsmouth and Port Vale won their games to avoid the drop.

=== Division Two ===
Graham Taylor's second spell as manager brought instant success as Watford won the Division Two championship. They were joined by runners-up Bristol City and playoff winners Grimsby Town.

Going down to Division Three were Brentford, Plymouth Argyle, Carlisle United and Southend United. Brentford had been losing playoff finalists just 12 months earlier, Plymouth had been promoted to Division Two just two seasons earlier, Carlisle were newly promoted and Southend had endured their second successive relegation.

=== Division Three ===
In their first season as a Football League club, Macclesfield Town finished runners-up in Division Three to gain their second successive promotion, a year after winning the Conference. They were joined by champions Notts County, who won the title by 17 points and became the first team since World War II to secure promotion in March, third-placed Lincoln City and playoff winners Colchester United.

Doncaster Rovers suffered an English league record of 34 defeats and won just four games to lose their league status. They were replaced by Conference champions Halifax Town, who regained their league status five years after losing it.

=== FA Cup ===
Arsenal became only the second club to have won two doubles after they beat Newcastle United 2–0 and added the FA Cup to their Premiership title triumph.

=== League Cup ===
Chelsea beat Middlesbrough 2–0 to give new manager Gianluca Vialli his first major trophy just weeks after being appointed.

== Award winners and statistical leaders ==
Dennis Bergkamp played in Arsenal's double-winning team and was voted both PFA Players' Player of the Year and FWA Footballer of the Year.

Liverpool's 18-year-old striker Michael Owen scored 18 Premiership goals and became the youngest England player of the 20th century. He was voted PFA Young Player of the Year. Owen shared the Premier League Golden Boot with Chris Sutton of Blackburn Rovers and Coventry City's Dion Dublin.

Owen's Liverpool teammate Steve McManaman had 12 assists in the league, placing him behind Manchester United's David Beckham, who was the top goal assists maker in the league.

== Successful managers ==
Arsène Wenger won his first major trophy as Arsenal manager by guiding them to Premiership and FA Cup glory.

Gianluca Vialli, 33, kicked off his management career by winning the League Cup and Cup Winners' Cup with Chelsea.

Alan Curbishley finally succeeded in getting Charlton promoted to the Premiership after seven seasons of trying on limited resources.

Dave Bassett succeeded in getting Nottingham Forest promoted back to the Premiership at the first time of asking.

Bryan Robson returned Middlesbrough to the Premiership as Division One runners-up, as well as taking them to runners-up spot in the League Cup.

Graham Taylor began his second spell as Watford manager by winning the Division Two championship and giving his club their first successful season since they were league runners-up back in 1983.

Sammy McIlroy achieved a second successive promotion for Macclesfield Town in their first season of league football.

Alan Buckley achieved promotion for Grimsby Town after their relegation from Division One. Also took the team to Wembley for the first time in its history to win the Associate Members Cup against AFC Bournemouth.

Sam Allardyce took Notts County to the Division Three title with 99 points, the highest tally in any division this season.

Shane Westley won promotion to Division Two just weeks after taking over as manager of Lincoln City.

George Mulhall, 62, returned Halifax Town to the Football League as Conference champions five years after they had been demoted.

== Events ==
=== Double glory for Arsenal and Chelsea ===
Arsenal equalled Manchester United's record of two league championship and FA Cup doubles when they overhauled Alex Ferguson's men in the Premiership title race and beat Kenny Dalglish's Newcastle United in the FA Cup final in Arsène Wenger's second season at Highbury.

Chelsea completed the other half of the London double by beating Middlesbrough in the League Cup final and VFB Stuttgart in the Cup Winners Cup final, within three months of 33-year-old striker Gianluca Vialli taking over as player-manager after Ruud Gullit was sacked for arguing about transfer funds with chairman Ken Bates.

=== Stoke and Man City relegated ===
Manchester City were relegated to the third tier for the first time in their history. City had started the Division One campaign badly and manager Frank Clark (footballer) was sacked in March, with former Everton manager Joe Royle being appointed as his successor. City went into their final game of the season at Stoke, with both sides knowing that they had to win to stand any chance of avoiding relegation. In the end City won 5–2, but both teams were relegated because Portsmouth and Port Vale won their games. Stoke were relegated in the first season of their new home, the Britannia Stadium.

== National team ==
In October 1997, England achieved automatic qualification for the 1998 World Cup after drawing 0–0 in Rome with Italy, who then had to navigate a two-leg playoff. The following February, Michael Owen became the youngest-ever England international when he played in the nation's 2–0 defeat against Chile.

England took on Argentina in the Second Round of the World Cup in France, with a goal by 18-year-old striker Michael Owen giving them an early lead. The score was 2–2 with 45 minutes played, and early in the second half Diego Simeone fouled David Beckham and sent the 23-year-old midfielder falling to the ground. Beckham, still lying on the ground, reacted by kicking Simeone in the shins and was sent off. The game finished 2–2, and England lost the resultant penalty shoot-out after David Batty and Paul Ince's shots were saved. The trophy was finally won by hosts France.

== Women's football ==
=== Women's Premier League ===
==== National Division ====
Pos	Team	Pld	W	D	L	GF	GA	GD	Pts	Qualification or relegation
1	Everton (C)	18	13	4	1	54	14	+40	43	
2	Arsenal	18	12	4	2	55	22	+33	40	
3	Doncaster Belles	18	12	2	4	54	18	+36	38	
4	Croydon	18	10	5	3	47	14	+33	35	
5	Millwall Lionesses	18	8	5	5	37	15	+22	29	
6	Liverpool	18	8	3	7	33	25	+8	27	
7	Tranmere Rovers	18	5	4	9	33	43	−10	19	
8	Bradford City	18	3	3	12	38	52	−14	12	
9	Berkhamsted Town (R)	18	3	2	13	22	64	−42	11	Relegation to the Northern Division
10	Wembley (R)	18	0	0	18	3	109	−106	0	Relegation to the Southern Division

Source: FA WPL
(C) Champions; (R) Relegated

==== Northern Division ====
Pos	Team	Pld	W	D	L	GF	GA	GD	Pts	Promotion or relegation
1	Ilkeston Town (C, P)	18	17	0	1	68	6	+62	51	Promotion to the National Division
2	Garswood Saints	18	12	3	3	43	23	+20	39	
3	Aston Villa	18	10	2	6	38	23	+15	32	
4	Wolverhampton Wanderers	18	8	5	5	33	20	+13	29	
5	Blyth Spartans Kestrels	18	8	4	6	40	23	+17	28	
6	Sheffield Wednesday	18	8	3	7	39	40	−1	27	
7	Huddersfield Town	18	7	3	8	32	31	+1	24	
8	Coventry City	18	2	6	10	22	62	−40	12	
9	Arnold Town	18	2	4	12	11	36	−25	10	
10	Bloxwich Town (R)	18	0	2	16	12	74	−62	2	Relegation to the Midland Combination League

Source: FA WPL
(C) Champions; (P) Promoted; (R) Relegated

==== Southern Division ====
Pos	Team	Pld	W	D	L	GF	GA	GD	Pts	Promotion or relegation
1	Southampton Saints (C, P)	18	12	6	0	50	14	+36	42	Promotion to the National Division
2	Brighton & Hove Albion	18	12	2	4	64	21	+43	38	
3	Wimbledon	18	11	3	4	64	30	+34	36	
4	Langford	18	10	4	4	52	33	+19	34	
5	Whitehawk	18	9	4	5	69	30	+39	31	
6	Barry Town (Note: Barry Town given wins against Ipswich Town and twice against Rushden and Diamonds as fixtures unfulfilled)	18	6	5	7	23	29	−6	23	
7	Three Bridges	18	7	1	10	47	37	+10	22	
8	Ipswich Town	18	5	3	10	33	31	+2	18	
9	Leyton Orient	18	3	2	13	23	62	−39	11	
10	Rushden & Diamonds (R)	18	0	0	18	10	148	−138	0	Relegation to the South East Combination League

Source: FA WPL
(C) Champions; (P) Promoted; (R) Relegated

=== FA Women's Cup ===
==== Final ====
4 May 1998
14:00 BST

Arsenal	3–2	Croydon
Spacey 17'; Yankey 52'; Few 90+2'	Report	Broadhurst 10' (pen.); Powell 55'

The New Den, London
Attendance: 2,205
Referee: Alan Wiley (Staffordshire)

== Famous debutants ==
8 August 1997: Robbie Keane, 17-year-old striker, scores on his debut for Wolverhampton Wanderers against Norwich City in Division One. On the same day, defender Paul Konchesky makes his debut for Charlton Athletic and becomes their youngest ever player in a competitive match, just 93 days after his 16th birthday.

10 January 1998: Aaron Hughes, 17-year-old defender, makes his debut for Newcastle United their 2–1 away defeat to Sheffield Wednesday in the Premier League.

2 May 1998: Wes Brown, 18-year-old central defender, made his debut for Manchester United as a substitute against Leeds United in the penultimate game of the Premier League season.

2 May 1998: Gareth Barry, 17-year-old Central defender, made his debut for Aston Villa against Sheffield Wednesday in the Premier League

== Honours ==
Competition	Winner
FA Premier League	Arsenal (11/1)
FA Cup	Arsenal (7)
Football League Cup	Chelsea (2)
Football League First Division	Nottingham Forest
Football League Second Division	Watford
Football League Third Division	Notts County
FA Community Shield	Manchester United

Notes = Number in parentheses is the times that club has won that honour (First Division & Premier League). Number after slash is Premier League only. * indicates new record for competition

== League tables ==
=== FA Premier League ===
Arsène Wenger became the first foreign manager to win an English top division title when his Arsenal side went on a storming run in the second half of the season to overhaul a Manchester United side who had looked uncatchable until well into March. Liverpool, inspired by brilliant teenager striker Michael Owen, managed a third-place finish, while fourth place went to a Chelsea side who enjoyed their first top-five finish since 1990 and also added the League Cup and European Cup Winners' Cup to their honours list soon after Ruud Gullit was suddenly sacked in favour of Gianluca Vialli. Leeds United finished fifth to earn a return to European competition after two difficult seasons, while Blackburn Rovers also qualified for the UEFA Cup with a sixth-place finish, as did seventh placed Aston Villa whose new manager John Gregory had taken them from the fringe of a relegation battle in the space of three months.

Newcastle United, handicapped by the pre-season departures of Les Ferdinand and David Ginola, as well as the injury-enforced absence of Alan Shearer in the first half of the season, endured a disappointing season in the league as they finished 13th. Ferdinand and Ginola's new club Tottenham could only manage a 14th-place finish.

Going down were all three newly promoted clubs; Crystal Palace, Barnsley and Bolton Wanderers. It was the first occasion when all three newly promoted clubs were relegated from any division, and would not occur again until 2024. Barnsley remains the most recent of six clubs that so far have only completed one season in the top flight. (Note: The others are Glossop North End in 1899–1900, Leyton Orient in 1962–63, Northampton Town in 1965–66, Carlisle United in 1974–75 and Swindon Town in 1993–94.)

Everton, who had been in the top flight since 1954, only survived relegation on goal difference.

Pos	Team	Pld	W	D	L	GF	GA	GD	Pts	Qualification or relegation
1	Arsenal (C)	38	23	9	6	68	33	+35	78	Qualification for the Champions League group stage
2	Manchester United	38	23	8	7	73	26	+47	77	Qualification for the Champions League second qualifying round
3	Liverpool	38	18	11	9	68	42	+26	65	Qualification for the UEFA Cup first round
4	Chelsea	38	20	3	15	71	43	+28	63	Qualification for the Cup Winners' Cup first round (Note: Chelsea qualified for the Cup Winners' Cup as defending champions. As they were also the League Cup winners, the UEFA Cup berth vacated was awarded to Blackburn Rovers.)
5	Leeds United	38	17	8	13	57	46	+11	59	Qualification for the UEFA Cup first round (Note: Aston Villa was rewarded entry to the UEFA Cup through UEFA Fair Play ranking.)
6	Blackburn Rovers	38	16	10	12	57	52	+5	58	Qualification for the UEFA Cup first round
7	Aston Villa	38	17	6	15	49	48	+1	57	Qualification for the UEFA Cup first round
8	West Ham United	38	16	8	14	56	57	−1	56	
9	Derby County	38	16	7	15	52	49	+3	55	
10	Leicester City	38	13	14	11	51	41	+10	53	
11	Coventry City	38	12	16	10	46	44	+2	52	
12	Southampton	38	14	6	18	50	55	−5	48	
13	Newcastle United	38	11	11	16	35	44	−9	44	Qualification for the Cup Winners' Cup first round (Note: As Arsenal qualified for the Champions League, their Cup Winners' Cup place as FA Cup winners defaulted to Newcastle United, the runners-up.)
14	Tottenham Hotspur	38	11	11	16	44	56	−12	44	
15	Wimbledon	38	10	14	14	34	46	−12	44	
16	Sheffield Wednesday	38	12	8	18	52	67	−15	44	
17	Everton	38	9	13	16	41	56	−15	40	
18	Bolton Wanderers (R)	38	9	13	16	41	61	−20	40	Relegation to the Football League First Division
19	Barnsley (R)	38	10	5	23	37	82	−45	35	Relegation to the Football League First Division
20	Crystal Palace (Note: Crystal Palace qualified for the 1998 Intertoto Cup as they were the only English team who applied.) (R)	38	8	9	21	37	71	−34	33	Intertoto Cup third round and relegation to the First Division

Source: Premier League
Rules for classification: 1) points; 2) goal difference; 3) number of goals scored.
(C) Champions; (R) Relegated
Notes:

Leading goalscorers: Dion Dublin (Coventry City), Michael Owen (Liverpool), and Chris Sutton (Blackburn Rovers) – 18

=== First Division ===
The three sides that had been relegated from the Premier League the previous year would (in reverse order) make up the top three teams in Division One this season, resulting in Nottingham Forest being promoted as champions and Middlesbrough as runners-up. The play-offs were won by Charlton Athletic, who beat Sunderland (the third side that were relegated from the previous season's Premier League) in one of the most exciting play-off finals to date, in order to avoid the first-ever feat of a carbon copy of the same teams competing in the Premier League.

FA Cup semi-finalists Wolves missed out on the playoffs, while their local rivals Birmingham only missed out by a single goal – the closest the St Andrew's side had come to reclaiming their top flight place since losing it in 1986. Stockport County finished eighth in their first season at this level for decades, while Crewe Alexandra finished eleventh in their first second tier campaign since 1895–96.

Reading and Stoke City made up the bottom two; both clubs been in mid-table for most of the campaign, but they totally fell apart later in season and were relegated in bottom place. By far the biggest shock was Manchester City's relegation to Division Two; they had improved in the final weeks of the season, but all of the clubs above them went on similarly good runs as the season drew to a close, consigning City to the third tier for the first time ever.

Pos	Team	Pld	W	D	L	GF	GA	GD	Pts	Qualification or relegation
1	Nottingham Forest (C, P)	46	28	10	8	82	42	+40	94	Promotion to the Premier League
2	Middlesbrough (P)	46	27	10	9	77	41	+36	91	Promotion to the Premier League
3	Sunderland	46	26	12	8	86	50	+36	90	Qualification for the First Division play-offs
4	Charlton Athletic (O, P)	46	26	10	10	80	49	+31	88	Qualification for the First Division play-offs
5	Ipswich Town	46	23	14	9	77	43	+34	83	Qualification for the First Division play-offs
6	Sheffield United	46	19	17	10	69	54	+15	74	Qualification for the First Division play-offs
7	Birmingham City	46	19	17	10	60	35	+25	74	
8	Stockport County	46	19	8	19	71	69	+2	65	
9	Wolverhampton Wanderers	46	18	11	17	57	53	+4	65	
10	West Bromwich Albion	46	16	13	17	50	56	−6	61	
11	Crewe Alexandra	46	18	5	23	58	65	−7	59	
12	Oxford United	46	16	10	20	60	64	−4	58	
13	Bradford City	46	14	15	17	46	59	−13	57	
14	Tranmere Rovers	46	14	14	18	54	57	−3	56	
15	Norwich City	46	14	13	19	52	69	−17	55	
16	Huddersfield Town	46	14	11	21	50	72	−22	53	
17	Bury	46	11	19	16	42	58	−16	52	
18	Swindon Town	46	14	10	22	42	73	−31	52	
19	Port Vale	46	13	10	23	56	66	−10	49	
20	Portsmouth	46	13	10	23	51	63	−12	49	
21	Queens Park Rangers	46	10	19	17	51	63	−12	49	
22	Manchester City (R)	46	12	12	22	56	57	−1	48	Relegation to the Second Division
23	Stoke City (R)	46	11	13	22	44	74	−30	46	Relegation to the Second Division
24	Reading (R)	46	11	9	26	39	78	−39	42	Relegation to the Second Division

Source: Statto.com
Rules for classification: 1) Points; 2) Goals scored; 3) Goal difference
(C) Champions; (O) Play-off winners; (P) Promoted; (R) Relegated

Leading goalscorers: Kevin Phillips (Sunderland) and Pierre van Hooijdonk (Nottingham Forest) – 29

=== Second Division ===
Watford were promoted as champions under returning manager Graham Taylor, who reversed a decline that the club had been in ever since he previously left the club in 1987. Bristol City were promoted in the runners-up spot, while Grimsby won the play-offs, making an immediate return to Division One after being relegated the previous year.

Southend suffered their second successive relegation. Carlisle suffered an immediate relegation back to Division Three after the previous year's promotion; chairman Michael Knighton's shock gambit of sacking promotion-winning manager Mervyn Day weeks into the season and appointing himself as manager nearly paid off, but a late implosion saw them relegated after losing 9 of their last 10 matches. Plymouth Argyle were unable to pull off the survival act they had achieved the year before, and went down. Brentford were the final relegated club, as an awful start to the season counted against them in the end, just one season after they had been defeated in the Division Two playoff final – a carbon copy of what had happened to Notts County a year earlier.

Burnley managed to escape relegation at Brentford's expense but this did not save the job of player-manager Chris Waddle, who was replaced with Bury's Stan Ternent. Millwall sacked manager Billy Bonds after just one season, where a late slump had seen them finish 18th (their lowest position for 15 years) and only decent form earlier in the season prevented them from dropping into Division Three.

With Preston failing to mount a promotion challenge, Gary Peters was sacked as manager in early 1998 and replaced with David Moyes, who was appointed manager on a permanent basis at the season's end.

Pos	Team	Pld	W	D	L	GF	GA	GD	Pts	Promotion or relegation
1	Watford (C, P)	46	24	16	6	67	41	+26	88	Promotion to the First Division
2	Bristol City (P)	46	25	10	11	69	39	+30	85	Promotion to the First Division
3	Grimsby Town (O, P)	46	19	15	12	55	37	+18	72	Qualification for the Second Division play-offs
4	Northampton Town	46	18	17	11	52	37	+15	71	Qualification for the Second Division play-offs
5	Bristol Rovers	46	20	10	16	70	64	+6	70	Qualification for the Second Division play-offs
6	Fulham	46	20	10	16	60	43	+17	70	Qualification for the Second Division play-offs
7	Wrexham	46	18	16	12	55	51	+4	70	
8	Gillingham	46	19	13	14	52	47	+5	70	
9	Bournemouth	46	18	12	16	57	52	+5	66	
10	Chesterfield	46	16	17	13	46	44	+2	65	
11	Wigan Athletic	46	17	11	18	64	66	−2	62	
12	Blackpool	46	17	11	18	59	67	−8	62	
13	Oldham Athletic	46	15	16	15	62	54	+8	61	
14	Wycombe Wanderers	46	14	18	14	51	53	−2	60	
15	Preston North End	46	15	14	17	56	56	0	59	
16	York City	46	14	17	15	52	58	−6	59	
17	Luton Town	46	14	15	17	60	64	−4	57	
18	Millwall	46	14	13	19	43	54	−11	55	
19	Walsall	46	14	12	20	43	52	−9	54	
20	Burnley	46	13	13	20	55	65	−10	52	
21	Brentford (R)	46	11	17	18	50	71	−21	50	Relegation to the Third Division
22	Plymouth Argyle (R)	46	12	13	21	55	70	−15	49	Relegation to the Third Division
23	Carlisle United (R)	46	12	8	26	57	73	−16	44	Relegation to the Third Division
24	Southend United (R)	46	11	10	25	47	79	−32	43	Relegation to the Third Division

Rules for classification: In the Football League goals scored (GF) takes precedence over goal difference (GD).
(C) Champions; (O) Play-off winners; (P) Promoted; (R) Relegated

Leading goalscorer: Barry Hayles (Bristol Rovers) – 23

=== Third Division ===
Notts County earned a record-breaking promotion, setting a new record for the earliest in the season that any club had earned promotion. Macclesfield Town's first season in the Football League was a huge success, and they were promoted as runners-up. The third and final automatic promotion spot was taken by Lincoln City, who managed promotion despite management and financial problems during the season. Colchester United narrowly missed out on an automatic promotion spot, but made up for this by winning the play-offs.

Doncaster Rovers fell into the Football Conference with a league record 34 defeats, and were replaced by a returning Halifax Town. Brighton were second from bottom once again, but at least their league status was never under any realistic threat due to Doncaster's hopeless form. Similarly, Hull City recorded their lowest-ever finish with a points total that would have seen them finish bottom in most years, but they were kept out of danger by the even worse performances of the two sides below them.

Both Hartlepool and Cardiff managed 23 draws, equalling the record for draws in a season. Both clubs finished in the bottom half of the table, their league status never under any real danger, but the failure to convert draws into victories meant that a promotion challenge was never realistically on the cards for either side.

Pos	Team	Pld	W	D	L	GF	GA	GD	Pts	Promotion or relegation
1	Notts County (C, P)	46	29	12	5	82	43	+39	99	Promotion to the Second Division
2	Macclesfield Town (P)	46	23	13	10	63	44	+19	82	Promotion to the Second Division
3	Lincoln City (P)	46	20	15	11	60	51	+9	75	Promotion to the Second Division
4	Colchester United (O, P)	46	21	11	14	72	60	+12	74	Qualification for the Third Division play-offs
5	Torquay United	46	21	11	14	68	59	+9	74	Qualification for the Third Division play-offs
6	Scarborough	46	19	15	12	67	58	+9	72	Qualification for the Third Division play-offs
7	Barnet	46	19	13	14	61	51	+10	70	Qualification for the Third Division play-offs
8	Scunthorpe United	46	19	12	15	56	52	+4	69	
9	Rotherham United	46	16	19	11	67	61	+6	67	
10	Peterborough United	46	18	13	15	63	51	+12	67	
11	Leyton Orient	46	19	12	15	62	47	+15	66 (Note: Leyton Orient had 3 points deducted.)	
12	Mansfield Town	46	16	17	13	64	55	+9	65	
13	Shrewsbury Town	46	16	13	17	61	62	−1	61	
14	Chester City	46	17	10	19	60	61	−1	61	
15	Exeter City	46	15	15	16	68	63	+5	60	
16	Cambridge United	46	14	18	14	63	57	+6	60	
17	Hartlepool United	46	12	23	11	61	53	+8	59	
18	Rochdale	46	17	7	22	56	55	+1	58	
19	Darlington	46	14	12	20	56	72	−16	54	
20	Swansea City	46	13	11	22	49	62	−13	50	
21	Cardiff City	46	9	23	14	48	52	−4	50	
22	Hull City	46	11	8	27	56	83	−27	41	
23	Brighton & Hove Albion	46	6	17	23	38	66	−28	35	
24	Doncaster Rovers (R)	46	4	8	34	30	113	−83	20	Relegation to Football Conference

Rules for classification: In the Football League goals scored (GF) takes precedence over goal difference (GD).
(C) Champions; (O) Play-off winners; (P) Promoted; (R) Relegated
Notes:

Leading goalscorer: Gary Jones (Notts County) – 28

== Diary of the season ==
7 July 1997 – Middlesbrough pay £4.5million (a record for a club outside the top flight) for Arsenal midfielder Paul Merson.

10 July 1997 – After two years with Inter Milan, Paul Ince returns to England in a £4.2million move to Liverpool.

15 July 1997 – Liverpool sign Crewe Alexandra midfielder Danny Murphy for £3million and Tottenham Hotspur sign Newcastle United winger David Ginola for £2million.

21 July 1997 – David Hopkin, the player who scored the goal that got Crystal Palace promoted to the Premier League in this year's Division One playoff final, joins Leeds United for £3.25million.

29 July 1997 – Newcastle United sell striker Les Ferdinand to Tottenham Hotspur for £6million.

1 August 1997 – Crystal Palace sign Italy midfielder Attilio Lombardo from Juventus for £1.6million.

7 August 1997 – Footballers Bruce Grobbelaar, Hans Segers and John Fashanu, along with a Thai businessman, are cleared of match-fixing at Winchester Crown Court.

8 August 1997 – Graeme Le Saux returns to Chelsea after more than four years at Blackburn Rovers in a £5million deal – a national record for a defender.

9 August 1997 – Barnsley's first top flight game ends in a 2–1 home defeat by West Ham United. Coventry City, who narrowly survived last season, pulled off a major surprise by defeating FA Cup holders Chelsea 3–2 at Highfield Road. Despite Alan Shearer's absence, Newcastle United beat Sheffield Wednesday 2–1 at home as Kenny Dalglish continues his quest to try to become the first manager to win the English top division title at three different clubs.

11 August 1997 – Manchester United match the new national record for a defender when they sign Henning Berg from Blackburn Rovers for £5million.

13 August 1997 – Leicester City shock Liverpool with a 2–1 league win at Anfield.

16 August 1997 – Arsenal announce plans to relocate from Highbury due to its sub-40,000 capacity and difficulties for expansion.

18 August 1997 – 36-year-old Peter Beardsley leaves Newcastle United in a £450,000 move to Bolton Wanderers.

24 August 1997 – Chelsea record one of the biggest ever away league wins in the Premier League with a 6–0 victory over Barnsley at Oakwell.

25 August 1997 – Blackburn Rovers beat Sheffield Wednesday 7–2 in the league at Ewood Park.

31 August 1997 – The Liverpool-Newcastle United FA Premier League fixture is cancelled as a mark of respect for the late Diana, Princess of Wales, who died earlier in the day in a Paris car crash. The month-end Premier League table shows Blackburn Rovers on a hot run of form under their new manager Roy Hodgson, topping the league on goal difference ahead of defending champions Manchester United, while West Ham United, Chelsea and Arsenal provide the nearest competition. Wimbledon, Aston Villa and Southampton occupy the relegation zone, while newly promoted Bolton Wanderers, Barnsley (playing top division football for the first time) at Crystal Palace have all had a decent first month of the season. Nottingham Forest head the race for a Premier League place as Division One leaders, while Bradford City occupy second place in a division they had been expected to struggle in. West Bromwich Albion, Swindon Town, Sheffield United and Portsmouth complete the top six.

1 September 1997 – Bolton Wanderers move into their new 27,500-seat Reebok Stadium after 102 years at Burnden Park, and draw 0–0 with Everton in the league in their first game there. This result would be pivotal in the end of season positions. Everton survived on goal difference to Bolton Wanderers, who had a clear goal disallowed as the officials failed to see the ball cross the goal-line.

6 September 1997 – There are no major football matches as the entire Football League programme is moved to the previous Friday or the following Sunday on the day of the funeral of Diana, Princess of Wales (there were no Premier League matches scheduled because of international fixtures).

13 September 1997 – Wimbledon continue their tradition of surprise wins over big clubs by defeating Newcastle United 3–1 on Tyneside.

14 September 1997 – Two resurgent sides, Blackburn Rovers and Leeds United, battle it out in a thrilling Premier League at Ewood Park in which the visitors triumph 4–3.

25 September 1997 – Kevin Keegan returns to football as Fulham FC's "Chief Operating Officer", working in conjunction with new Head Coach Ray Wilkins.

27 September 1997 – Manchester United captain Roy Keane suffers knee ligament damage against Leeds United in a FA Premier League 1–0 defeat at Elland Road and is ruled out for the rest of the season.

30 September 1997 – September ends with Arsenal as Premier League leaders, with Manchester United second. The previous month-end leaders Blackburn Rovers have slipped into fifth place, while Leicester City (without a top division league title to their name) currently occupy third place and are just a single point off the top spot, and Chelsea occupy fourth place. A terrible run of form has pushed Southampton into bottom place, while Barnsley's reasonable start to their first top division season has given way to a series of heavy defeats and they now occupy the next lowest position in the league. The final place in the relegation zone is occupied by Sheffield Wednesday. Nottingham Forest continue to lead the way in Division One, with surprise promotion contenders West Bromwich Albion now second. QPR have crept into the playoff zone at the expense of Portsmouth (who have slumped to 19th). Bradford City, Sheffield United and Swindon Town complete the top six.

2 October 1997 – Bolton Wanderers pay a club record £3.5million for Wimbledon striker Dean Holdsworth.

4 October 1997 – Barnsley lose 5–0 to league leaders Arsenal at Highbury.

18 October 1997 – Referee David Ellery changes into a blue top for the second half of the Premier League game between Leeds United and Newcastle United, after his original green shirt clashed with Newcastle's away kit.

24 October 1997 – Paul Peschisolido becomes the first player to join a third-tier club for a seven-figure sum when he joins Fulham for £1.1million from West Bromwich Albion.

25 October 1997 – Barnsley are on the receiving end of yet another heavy defeat, this time a 7–0 hammering by Manchester United at Old Trafford which sends the hosts to the top of the table.

31 October 1997 – Manchester United finish October as Premier League leaders, leapfrogging Arsenal into second place, while Blackburn Rovers have got their title challenge back on track by climbing into third place. Chelsea and Liverpool complete the top five, with Leicester City, Derby County and Wimbledon putting immense pressure on them. A dismal run of form has pushed Bolton Wanderers into bottom place, while Barnsley occupying the next lowest position and Sheffield Wednesday completing the bottom three. Nottingham Forest remain top of Division One, while Swindon Town's surprise challenge for a second promotion in three seasons continues as they now occupy second place. Middlesbrough, West Bromwich Albion, Bradford City and Charlton Athletic complete the top six.

1 November 1997 – Manchester United boost their own lead of the Premier League with a 6–1 home win over Sheffield Wednesday, which pushes the visitors further into relegation trouble just one season after they narrowly missed out on a UEFA Cup place.

9 November 1997 – Arsenal cut Manchester United's advantage in the Premier League title race by beating them 3–2 at Highbury. Teddy Sheringjam scores twice for United, while Nicolas Anelka scores his first Gunners goal.

12 November 1997 – Michele Padovano, Juventus striker, joins Crystal Palace for £1.7million.

18 November 1997 – Premier League officials express their desire for a two-up, two-down system to operate between the top two divisions in English football, which would spell at end to the traditional three-up and three-down system which has been in use since 1974 (with an exception to four seasons between 1986 and 1995 when the league was being restructured). It also wants to give member clubs the option to withdraw from the Football League Cup.

22 November 1997 – Manchester United bounce back from their Arsenal defeat by returning to London and achieving a 5–2 away win over Wimbledon. Arsenal, meanwhile, suffer a shock 2–0 defeat at struggling Sheffield Wednesday.

29 November 1997 – Iran qualify for the 1998 World Cup at the expense of Australia, whose national coach Terry Venables steps down after one year in charge.

30 November 1997 – November draws to a close with Manchester United still top of the Premier League, with Chelsea, Blackburn Rovers and Leeds United putting up a strong challenge, while Arsenal's title bid appears to be fading away as they now occupy fifth place and are seven points off the top. Everton are now bottom of the top division where they have so far played for 44 seasons in succession, with Barnsley and Bolton Wanderers completing the bottom three. Nottingham Forest are still top of Division One and Middlesbrough are second. The playoff zone is occupied by West Bromwich Albion, Sheffield United, Swindon Town and Charlton Athletic, while Stockport County are on the edge of the playoff zone as surprise contenders for a second successive promotion.

1 December 1997 – Fulham break the Division Two transfer record once again when they pay Blackburn Rovers £2million for defender Chris Coleman.

6 December 1997 –

  - Former Leeds United and Scotland midfielder Billy Bremner dies aged 54 after suffering a heart attack.
    - Tottenham's relegation worries are deepened by a 6–1 home defeat at the hands of Chelsea, while Manchester United's title hopes are boosted by a 3–1 away win over Liverpool.

9 December 1997 – Aston Villa overcome FC Steaua București in the UEFA Cup third round with goals from Savo Milošević and Ian Taylor.

19 December 1997 – Liverpool sign USA goalkeeper Brad Friedel from Columbus Crew for £1million.

27 December 1997 – Manchester United agree to sell Czech winger Karel Poborský to Benfica after an unsuccessful 18 months at Old Trafford.

29 December 1997 – The English FA continue investigations into an Asian Betting Syndicate's links with English hooligans and mobsters to continuously shut off floodlights in Premiership stadia to get matches with "unfavourable" results postponed and cancelled. Affected clubs like West Ham, Derby County, Arsenal and Bolton Wanderers all filed official inquiries.

31 December 1997 – 1997 draws to a close with Manchester United now leading by a five-point margin over their nearest contenders Blackburn Rovers. Chelsea, Liverpool and Leeds United complete the top five, but Arsenal are now sixth and now need something little short of a miracle to bring the Premier League trophy to Highbury. Meanwhile, Barnsley prop up the top flight, while Everton and Tottenham Hotspur complete the bottom three. Middlesbrough and Nottingham Forest are level on points at the top of Division One, with the playoff zone being occupied by Sheffield United, Charlton Athletic, Sunderland and Wolverhampton Wanderers.

3 January 1998 – Holders Chelsea suffer a first hurdle defeat in the FA Cup when they lost 5–3 to Manchester United, while Conference club Stevenage Borough achieve a shock 2–1 away win over Division One Swindon Town.

10 January 1998 – Barnsley's defensive frailties show no sign of easing as they lose 6–0 to West Ham United at Upton Park.

17 January 1998 – Barnsley boost their survival hopes with a 1–0 home win over Crystal Palace, whose own recent downturn in form is threatening to cost them their Premier League status.

24 January 1998 – Walsall FC's hopes of pulling off a giant-killing feat in the FA Cup fourth round are ended when Manchester United crush them 5–1 at Old Trafford.

25 January 1998 – Stevenage Borough's FA Cup run continues when they hold Premier League club Newcastle United to a 1–1 draw at Broadhall Way, though a controversial refereeing decision saw them denied a goal which clearly went over the line and would have made them the first non-league time since Sutton United in 1989 to beat a top division club in the FA Cup.

27 January 1998 – Newcastle United sign Swedish striker Andreas Andersson from AC Milan.

31 January 1998 – Manchester United remain top of the Premier League as January draws to a close, despite losing 1–0 at home to Leicester City. They now lead their nearest rivals Chelsea, Blackburn Rovers and Liverpool by a four-point margin. Arsenal are beginning to rescue their season as they are now fifth in the league and just eight points off the top, with a game in hand. Barnsley remain bottom and Tottenham Hotspur have yet to climb clear of the bottom three, but Everton have jumped clear of the drop zone at the expense of Bolton Wanderers. Nottingham Forest and Middlesbrough continue to lead the way in Division One. Charlton Athletic, Sunderland, Sheffield United and Wolverhampton Wanderers complete the top six.

4 February 1998 – Stevenage Borough's FA Cup run ends in the fourth round replay when Newcastle United beat them 2–1 at St James's Park. 12 February 1998 – Chelsea manager Ruud Gullit is sacked after a dispute with chairman Ken Bates. 33-year-old striker Gianluca Vialli is installed as player-manager.

14 February 1998 – Five days after his England début, Michael Owen scores his first professional hat-trick, as Liverpool draw 3–3 with Sheffield Wednesday in the top-flight, and Ipswich Town were the high scorers of the day with their five against Huddersfield Town in Division One. Meanwhile, on FA Cup fifth round day, wins for Coventry City, Leeds United and Newcastle United saw them eliminate Aston Villa, Birmingham City and Tranmere Rovers, while Wimbledon and second-tier Wolverhampton Wanderers drew at Selhurst Park, and West Ham United face a replay at Ewood Park after they failed to beat a Blackburn Rovers side who had Kevin Gallacher sent off for an elbow on Eyal Berkovic.

23 February 1998 – Tottenham Hotspur sign Algerian midfielder Moussa Saib from Valencia CF of Spain for £2.3million.

25 February 1998 – Manchester United's FA Cup quest ends with a shock 3–2 defeat by Barnsley in the fifth round replay at Oakwell.

28 February 1998 – February draws to a close with Manchester United still top of the Premier League. They are 11 points ahead of second placed Blackburn Rovers, but third placed Arsenal have played three games less than Manchester United who they trail by 12 points. Liverpool, Chelsea and Derby County are the clubs giving the top three a run for their money. Crystal Palace, yet to win at home this season, are now bottom of the Premier League in a drop zone with includes the other two newly promoted clubs Bolton Wanderers and Barnsley. Everton and Tottenham Hotspur remain under the most direct threat from the bottom three. Middlesbrough are top of Division One with Nottingham Forest in second place. Sunderland, Charlton Athletic, Sheffield United and Stockport County complete the top six.

1 March 1998 – Manchester United enter March eleven points ahead at the top of the FA Premier League, with their nearest contenders Arsenal having 3 games in hand.

8 March 1998 – Barnsley's dreams of marking their first top division season with FA Cup glory are ended when they lost 3–1 at Newcastle United in the quarter-final.

10 March 1998 – Newcastle United sign Greek defender Nikos Dabizas from Olympiakos for £2million.

14 March 1998 – A solitary Marc Overmars goal sees Arsenal beat Manchester United 1–0 at Old Trafford to decrease United's lead to 6 points, plus they have the advantage of 3 games in hand.

28 March 1998 – Notts County, Division Three leaders, become the first English team to win promotion in March. In the Premier League, Manchester United bounce back from their Arsenal disappointment with a 2–0 home win over Wimbledon, while Arsenal keep the pressure intense with a 1–0 win over Sheffield Wednesday. Liverpool keep their slim title hopes alive with a 3–2 win over a Barnsley side battling against relegation.

31 March 1998 – Manchester United remain top of the league by a six-point margin as March ends, but their nearest contenders Arsenal have three games in hand. Liverpool in third place are nine points off the top with a game in hand, and meet United at Old Trafford in 10 days for what could be a decisive game in the title race. Chelsea occupy fourth place and if they finish in the top five then a sixth placed team will automatically qualify for the UEFA Cup for the first time as Chelsea have won the League Cup and new rules regarding European competitions mean that lower-placed teams can qualify for Europe. An unlikely bid for a UEFA Cup place is coming from West Ham United and Coventry City, two means who narrowly avoided relegation last season. Meanwhile, Barnsley, Bolton Wanderers and Crystal Palace continue to occupy the relegation zone. Nottingham Forest remain top of Division One, two points ahead of second placed Middlesbrough and four points ahead of third placed Sunderland. Charlton Athletic, Sheffield United and a resurgent Ipswich Town complete the top six.

5 April 1998 – Arsenal move closer to their second double by beating Wolverhampton Wanderers 1–0 in the FA Cup semi-final at Villa Park.

6 April 1998 – Newcastle United, who have had a dismal season in the Premier League, are given the hope of FA Cup glory after a semi-final win over Sheffield United at Old Trafford sends them into the FA Cup final for the first time since 1974.

26 April 1998 – Nottingham Forest go six points clear of third-placed Sunderland in the First Division with a win at home to Reading. Sunderland have two matches remaining.

28 April 1998 – Sunderland are beaten, confirming Nottingham Forest's promotion back to the Premier League.

29 April 1998 – An incident in a 0–0 draw between Leicester City and Newcastle United lead to Alan Shearer being investigated by the Football Association, after he appeared to deliberately kick Neil Lennon in the head.

30 April 1998 – April draws to a close with Arsenal now leading by a point ahead of Manchester United and having two games in hand, as United manager Alex Ferguson concedes the title despite his team's 3–0 win over Crystal Palace, whose relegation is confirmed. Meanwhile, Aston Villa have emerged as surprise contenders for a UEFA Cup place after spending most of the season battling relegation, and there will also be a UEFA Cup place for the seventh-placed club if Arsenal beat Newcastle United in the FA Cup final next month. At the other end of the table, Barnsley and Bolton Wanderers remain in the bottom three, but there is still a threat of relegation for Tottenham Hotspur and Everton as well as a Newcastle United side who came close to winning the title last season and the season before. Wimbledon, who only need two points from their final three games to achieve safety, are the only other team under threat of relegation. Nottingham Forest have sealed an immediate return to the top flight as Division One champions, while Middlesbrough, Sunderland and Charlton Athletic are still fighting it out for second place. Sheffield United and Birmingham City are challenging each other for the final playoff place.

3 May 1998 – Arsenal clinch the FA Premier League title with a 4–0 home win over Everton. Manchester City are relegated to Division Two, despite winning 5–2 at also-doomed Stoke City. It is the first time in their history that they will be playing in the third tier of the English league. They are also the first former winners of a European trophy to be relegated to the third tier of their domestic league.

6 May 1998 – In their first game at the title triumph, Arsenal hit relegation form when Liverpool beat them 4–0 at Anfield.

10 May 1998 – The FA Premier League season ends with Arsenal as champions and Manchester United as runners-up one point behind them, with both teams qualifying for the European Cup. The UEFA Cup places go to Liverpool, Chelsea, Leeds United, Blackburn Rovers and Aston Villa. Bolton Wanderers, Barnsley and Crystal Palace are relegated. Bolton were the last team to go down – their 2–0 defeat at Chelsea meaning that a 1–1 draw with Coventry City at Goodison Park was enough to achieve survival on goal difference for Everton.

16 May 1998 – Arsenal become the second English team (though with an entirely different set of players) to complete the 'double' when they beat Newcastle United 2–0 in the FA Cup final. Marc Overmars opens the scoring after 23 minutes, followed by 19-year-old Nicolas Anelka's goal in the 69th minute.

23 May 1998 – Derby County pay a club record £2.7million for Argentine defender Horacio Carbonari from Rosario.

25 May 1998 – Charlton Athletic win promotion to the FA Premier League after beating Sunderland 7–6 on penalties following a 4–4 draw in the Division One playoff final.

1 June 1998 – Blackburn Rovers pay a club record £7.5million for Southampton striker Kevin Davies, 21.

5 June 1998 – Aston Villa sign winger Alan Thompson from Bolton Wanderers for £4.5million.

== Deaths ==
- 10 July 1997: Ivor Allchurch, 67, was capped 68 times and scored 23 goals for Wales between 1950 and 1966, both national records at the time, also helping them qualify for their only World Cup to date in 1958. He scored a total of 249 league goals for Swansea City (then Swansea Town), Newcastle United and Cardiff City.
- 28 August 1997: Peter Springett, 51, was a goalkeeper for QPR and Sheffield Wednesday during the 1960s and 1970s, keeping goal for QPR in their 1967 League Cup triumph. He served as a policeman in South Yorkshire after retiring as a player, and died after a four-year battle against cancer.
- 7 December 1997: Billy Bremner, 54, midfielder for Leeds United during the Don Revie era, died after suffering a heart attack two days before his 55th birthday. He helped them win several trophies and managed the club from 1985 to 1988. He also had two spells in charge of Doncaster Rovers. He finished his playing career with Hull City.
- 24 December 1997: Andy Kerr, 66, played 10 league games at centre-forward for Manchester City in the late 1950s and then scored five goals from 18 games in the 1963-64 season for Sunderland during a career which was mostly spent in his native Scotland.
- 13 January 1998: Ian Moores, 43, who died of cancer, played as a forward for Stoke City, Tottenham Hotspur, Orient and Barnsley between 1974 and 1983 before beginning a successful five-year spell with APOEL in Cyprus. He finished his playing career with Tamworth, helping them win the FA Vase in 1989.
- 22 January 1998: George Marks, 82, played twice for Arsenal in the late 1930s and then kept goal a total of 194 times in postwar league football for Blackburn Rovers, Bristol City and Reading. He kept goal eight times for the England wartime international side.
- 18 February 1998: Robbie James, 40, played nearly 800 English league games between 1973 and 1994 for clubs including QPR, Leicester City, Swansea City and Cardiff City, and was a Welsh international midfielder. He was with Llanelli as player-manager when he collapsed in a Welsh Football League game against Porthcawl and was certified dead on his arrival at hospital.
- 26 February 1998: Jimmy Hagan, 80, who played 361 league matches for Sheffield United between 1938 and 1958, and once for England. As a manager he led S.L. Benfica to three successive Portuguese championships between 1970 and 1973.
- 13 March 1998: Peter Sillett, 65, was a right back for Chelsea when whey won the league championship in 1955. He was capped three times for England and was the older brother of John Sillett, who managed Coventry City to FA Cup glory in 1987. Sir Stanley Matthews rated Sillett as the best defender he had ever played against.
- 19 March 1998: Jimmy Scoular, 73, was born in Scotland but spent his whole playing career in England, playing 602 league games at wing-half between 1946 and 1964 for Portsmouth, Newcastle United and Bradford Park Avenue, and being capped nine times for Scotland in the early 1950s. He was player-manager of Bradford Park Avenue before managing Cardiff City for nine years and finally spending a year at Newport County before quitting management in 1977 and working for various clubs as a scout.
- 2 April 1998: Ronnie Dix, 85, was the Football League's youngest goalscorer when he netted for Bristol Rovers in 1928 at the age of 15. He played his last senior game in 1939 for Derby County, by which time he had scored 98 league goals and scored on his only England appearance in 1938.
- 2 May 1998: Justin Fashanu, 37, the first English footballer to disclose his homosexuality, was found dead in a lock-up garage in East London. He played for Norwich City in the early 1980s and became England's first £1million black footballer when he was sold to Nottingham Forest in 1981. He also had spells at other clubs, including Edmonton, Manchester City, West Ham United, Newcastle United, Torquay United, Airdrieonians and Heart of Midlothian. He was the older brother of striker John Fashanu. Justin Fashanu had fled the US after being arrested in Maryland on suspicion of sexually assaulting a 17-year-old boy. Four months after his death, a coroner recorded a verdict of suicide.
- 31 May 1998: Sammy Collins, 75, scored a club record 204 goals for Torquay United (all in the Third Division South) between 1948 and 1958.
- 15 June 1998: Keith Newton, 56, was a full-back for Everton, Blackburn Rovers and Burnley. He was selected in England squad for the 1970 World Cup.
- 27 June 1998: Jack Rowley, 78, was a high scoring centre forward for Manchester United who helped them win their first two trophies under Matt Busby – the FA Cup in 1948 and league championship in 1952. He was the older brother of another goalscoring legend, Arthur Rowley, who played for Leicester City and Shrewsbury Town.
