= Bub =

Bub or BUB may refer to:

== People ==
- Bub Asman (born 1949), American film editor
- Bub Bridger (1924–2009), New Zealand writer
- Bub Carrington (born 2005), American basketball player
- Bub Kuhn (1899–1956), American baseball player
- Bub McAtee (1845–1876), American baseball player
- Bub Means (born 2001), American football player
- Bub Strickler (1938–2005), American racecar driver
- Bub Walker (1907–1963), American football player and coach
- Bub Weller (1902–1993), American football player

== Other uses ==
- "Bub", a docile zombie in Day of the Dead (1985)
- Bub, a playable character in most of the Bubble Bobble video games
- Bub (film) (English 'Father'), 2001 Kashmiri-language movie
- Belgische Unie – Union Belge, a political party in Belgium
- BUB Seven Streamliner, an American-built motorcycle that held the motorcycle speed record from 2006 to 2008 and 2009 to 2010
- The ISO 639-3 code for the Bua language, spoken in Chad
- Lil Bub (2011–2019), a female cat and Internet celebrity known for her unique appearance
- Bub, an alligator antagonist in Dog Man

== See also ==
- Human genes:
  - BUB1, budding uninhibited by benzimidazoles 1 homolog (yeast)
  - BUB1B, budding uninhibited by benzimidazoles 1 homolog beta (yeast)
  - BUB3, budding uninhibited by benzimidazoles 3 homolog (yeast)
- Buba, river in Guinea-Bissau
- Bubb (disambiguation)
- Bubba, a relationship nickname formed from brother
- Bubble (disambiguation)
