= List of Carlisle United F.C. seasons =

Carlisle United Football Club is an English football club based in Carlisle, Cumbria, where they play at Brunton Park. Formed in 1904, the club currently compete in National League, the fifth tier of the English football league system.

== History ==
=== League ===
The club was formed on 17 May 1904 at Shaddongate United's annual general meeting where the club's members voted to change the team's name to Carlisle United. The newly formed club initially played at Milhome Bank and later at Devonshire Park, finally settling at their current home Brunton Park in 1909.

In 1905, Carlisle United joined the Lancashire Combination but were only admitted after agreeing to pay all visiting teams’ travel expenses for two years, due to Carlisle not being located in Lancashire. After the league reorganised four years later the board at United decided it did not suit the club's best interests to be there any longer and the club entered the North Eastern League in place of their reserve team who had previously played in the league and been a founding member. When the Carlisle United first team left to join the Football League the reserve team resumed its place in the competition. Carlisle United were crowned champions of the North Eastern League in 1922.

The 1927–28 season was Carlisle's last in the North Eastern League. The close season meant the usual round of applications to join (and be re-elected to) the Football League. Carlisle received the second-most votes with 33, and replaced Durham City, who had received just 11 votes, as members of the Football League.

Carlisle were members of the Third Division North until 1958 when it combined with the Third Division South to become the Fourth Division. They remained there until 1962 when they won their first promotion, they were relegated the following season but immediately bounced back to begin the most prosperous period in the club's history.

Upon gaining promotion to the Third Division in 1964 United immediately won the Third Division Championship the following year. Over twelve years the club cemented themselves as a solid Second Division (Then 2nd Tier in English football) side. Within that period Carlisle finished 7 out of 11 seasons in the top half of the table including 3rd in 66/67, 4th in 70/71 and a 3rd in 73/74 which saw them promoted to the top tier of English football.

Carlisle won their first three fixtures in the First Division to go top of the English football pyramid. The success was short lived however, they finished the season in bottom place and were relegated. Highlight victories include doing a double over Everton, and home victories over eventual champions Derby County, and former title holders Ipswich Town, Arsenal, Burnley, Tottenham Hotspur and Wolverhampton Wanderers.

Carlisle ended their most prosperous period as rapidly as it had started. Back to back relegations in 1986 and 1987 saw them enter the Fourth Division for the first time in 21 years. Their first season in there saw them finish second from bottom but 19 points ahead of relegated Newport County. The lull in league performance continued. A promotion push in 1990 was thwarted by a last match defeat to Maidstone United.

Some good then came of a new owner in the form of Michael Knighton whose financial input helped the club steer clear of relegation in 92/93 gain two promotions in 95, 97 to the second division (now 3rd tier) and gain success in the Football League Trophy. Unfortunately the promotions were immediately followed by relegations in 96 and 98 respectively.

In the 1998–99 season Carlisle found themselves in their second successive relegation battle and needing to gain three points from the final game of the season at home to Plymouth Argyle. At 90 minutes the crowd at Scarborough (Carlisle's relegation rival) were already celebrating before the fourth official stated four minutes of extra time would be played at Brunton Park. In the last kick of the game goalkeeper Jimmy Glass, who had signed in an emergency loan deal from Swindon Town after the transfer deadline, scored from a corner kick which he came up to in a last gasp effort to win the match.

In the following years Carlisle continued to narrowly avoid relegation one season after the other. From the 97/98 season through to 03/04 the club only once finished above 22nd in the English fourth tier. The bullet dodging did eventually cease however when in 2004 they lost Football league status for the first time since 1928, becoming the first former top flight club to fall into the fifth tier.

Carlisle were promoted out of the non-league at the first time of asking in 2005, winning the play-off final at the Britannia Stadium, Stoke. Carlisle's excellent form under manager Paul Simpson continued into the following season as they returned to the Football League with a bang, clinching the League Two title. Simpson then departed for Preston North End, and was succeeded by Neil McDonald. The following few seasons saw Carlisle achieve their highest league finishes for 22 years and the highest average crowds for 30 years. This coincided with several seasons at the top half of League One including a playoff finish in 2008.

=== Football League Trophy ===
Since its inception Carlisle have competed in almost every season of the Football League Trophy, including in 2004–05 when they did not hold Football League status. In total they have reached the final six times, more than any other team. The club first won the competition in 1997, beating Colchester United. The game, which took place at Wembley Stadium, was drawn 0–0 in 90 minutes and continued to a penalty shoot-out. Thanks to Tony Caig's heroics in goal Carlisle won the shoot-out 4–3. The second win came in 2011, a year after suffering a 4–1 defeat to Southampton in the previous final. This time Carlisle were able to defeat Brentford by a single goal.

== Key ==
Key to league record

- Level = Level of the league in the current league system
- Pld = Games played
- W = Games won
- D = Games drawn
- L = Games lost
- GF = Goals for
- GA = Goals against
- GD = Goals difference
- Pts = Points
- Position = Position in the final league table
- Top scorer and number of goals scored shown in bold when he was also top scorer for the division. Number of goals includes goals scored in play-offs.

Key to cup records

- Res = Final reached round
- Rec = Final club record in the form of wins-draws-losses
- PR = Preliminary round
- QR1 (2, etc.) = Qualifying Cup rounds
- G = Group stage
- R1 (2, etc.) = Proper Cup rounds
- QF = Quarter-finalists
- SF = Semi-finalists
- F = Finalists
- A (QF, SF, F) = Area quarter-, semi-, finalists
- W = Winners

== Seasons ==
Year	League	Lvl	Pld	W	D	L	GF	GA	GD	Pts	Position	Leading league scorer		FA Cup		FL Cup FA Trophy		FL Trophy		Average home attendance (Note: Average home attendance = for league games only)
Year	League	Lvl	Pld	W	D	L	GF	GA	GD	Pts	Position	Name	Goals	Res	Rec	Res	Rec	Res	Rec	Average home attendance
1904–05														QR1	0-1-1					
1905–06	**Lancashire Combination**; **Division Two**		36	14	6	16	70	73	-3	34	**13th of 19**			QR2	1-1-1					
1906–07	**Lancashire Combination**; **Division Two**		38	23	10	5	113	46	+67	56	**1st of 20**; Promoted			QR4	3-0-1					
1907–08	**Lancashire Combination**; **Division One**		38	23	8	7	79	55	+24	54	**2nd of 20**			R2	7-1-1					
1908–09	**Lancashire Combination**; **Division One**		38	18	8	12	79	70	+9	44	**6th of 20**			R1	1-2-1					
1909–10	**Lancashire Combination**; **Division One**		38	14	11	13	69	60	+9	39	**7th of 20**			R1	2-2-1					
Quit from the Lancashire Combination and replaced reserve team in the North Eastern League.
1910–11	**North Eastern League**		34	8	8	18	44	76	-32	24	**15th of 18**			QR5	1-1-1					
1911–12	**North Eastern League**		36	7	6	23	37	98	-61	20	**17th of 19**			QR4	0-0-1					
1912–13	**North Eastern League**		38	12	5	21	61	98	-37	29	**14th of 20**			QR4	0-0-1					
1913–14	**North Eastern League**		38	11	10	17	48	84	-36	32	**13th of 20**			QR5	4-1-1					
1914–15	**North Eastern League**		38	8	7	23	50	108	-58	23	**17th of 20**			QR3	2-0-1					
No competitive football was played between 1915 and 1919 due to the World War I.
1919–20	**North Eastern League**		34	12	3	19	47	76	-29	27	**13th of 18**			QR5	4-1-1					
1920–21	**North Eastern League**		38	18	10	10	79	46	+33	46	**6th of 20**			QR2	2-1-0					
1921–22	**North Eastern League**		38	24	8	6	85	39	+46	56	**1st of 20**			QR4	4-1-1					
1922–23	**North Eastern League**		38	19	8	11	56	43	+13	46	**6th of 20**			QR6	2-1-1					
1923–24	**North Eastern League**		38	13	8	17	46	61	-15	34	**11th of 20**			QR5	1-0-1					
1924–25	**North Eastern League**		38	16	6	16	67	63	+4	38	**11th of 20**			QR4	3-0-1					
1925–26	**North Eastern League**		38	19	9	10	83	76	+7	47	**5th of 20**			R1	1-0-1					
1926–27	**North Eastern League**		38	23	3	12	106	75	+31	49	**5th of 20**			R3	3-0-1					
1927–28	**North Eastern League**		38	25	5	8	111	61	+50	55	**2nd of 20**			R2	2-0-1					
Elected to the Football League replacing Durham City.
1928–29	**Football League**; **Third Division North**	3	42	19	8	15	86	77	+9	46	**8th of 22**	**Jimmy McConnell**	**42**	R2	1-0-1					7,796
1929–30	**Football League**; **Third Division North**	3	42	16	7	19	90	101	-11	39	**15th of 22**			R3	2-0-1					6,060
1930–31	**Football League**; **Third Division North**	3	42	20	5	17	98	81	+17	45	**8th of 22**	**Jimmy McConnell**	**37**	R3	2-0-1					5,838
1931–32	**Football League**; **Third Division North**	3	40	11	11	18	64	79	-15	33	**18th of 21**			R2	1-0-1					4,689
1932–33	**Football League**; **Third Division North**	3	42	13	7	22	51	75	-24	33	**19th of 22**			R2	1-1-1					5,210
1933–34	**Football League**; **Third Division North**	3	42	15	8	19	66	81	-15	38	**13th of 22**			R2	1-0-1					4,452
1934–35	**Football League**; **Third Division North**	3	42	8	7	27	51	102	-51	23	**22nd of 22**			R1	0-0-1					4,063
1935–36	**Football League**; **Third Division North**	3	42	14	12	16	56	62	-6	40	**13th of 22**			R1	0-0-1					6,481
1936–37	**Football League**; **Third Division North**	3	42	18	8	16	65	68	-3	44	**10th of 22**			R3	2-0-1					6,488
1937–38	**Football League**; **Third Division North**	3	42	15	9	18	57	67	-10	39	**12th of 22**			R1	0-0-1					6,408
1938–39	**Football League**; **Third Division North**	3	42	13	7	22	66	111	-45	33	**19th of 22**	**Wally Hunt**	**32**	R1	0-0-1					4,996
No competitive football was played between 1939 and 1946 due to the World War II.
1945–46														R2	2-0-2					
1946–47	**Football League**; **Third Division North**	3	42	14	9	19	70	93	-23	37	**16th of 22**			R3	2-0-1					10,263
1947–48	**Football League**; **Third Division North**	3	42	18	7	17	88	77	+11	43	**9th of 22**			R1	0-0-1					13,128
1948–49	**Football League**; **Third Division North**	3	42	14	11	17	60	77	-17	39	**15th of 22**			R1	0-0-0					11,129
1949–50	**Football League**; **Third Division North**	3	42	16	15	11	68	51	+17	47	**9th of 22**			R3	2-0-1					11,800
1950–51	**Football League**; **Third Division North**	3	46	25	12	9	79	50	+29	62	**3rd of 24**			R3	2-1-1					11,696
1951–52	**Football League**; **Third Division North**	3	46	19	13	14	62	57	+5	51	**7th of 24**			R1	0-0-1					10,100
1952–53	**Football League**; **Third Division North**	3	46	18	13	15	82	68	+14	49	**9th of 24**	**Jimmy Whitehouse**	**29**	R1	0-0-1					8,103
1953–54	**Football League**; **Third Division North**	3	46	14	15	17	83	71	+12	43	**13th of 24**	**Alan Ashman**	**32**	R1	0-0-1					6,955
1954–55	**Football League**; **Third Division North**	3	46	15	6	25	78	89	-11	36	**20th of 24**			R2	1-1-1					5,619
1955–56	**Football League**; **Third Division North**	3	46	15	8	23	71	95	-24	38	**21st of 24**			R1	0-2-1					6,894
1956–57	**Football League**; **Third Division North**	3	46	16	13	17	76	85	-9	45	**15th of 24**			R3	2-1-1					7,430
1957–58	**Football League**; **Third Division North**	3	46	19	6	21	80	78	+2	44	**16th of 24**	**Alf Ackerman**	**35**	R2	1-1-1					8,525
Regional Third divisions merged creating nationwide Third Division and Fourth Division. Club has not qualified to join Third Division.
1958–59	**Football League**; **Fourth Division**	4	46	19	12	15	62	65	-3	50	**10th of 24**			R2	1-1-1					7,172
1959–60	**Football League**; **Fourth Division**	4	46	15	11	20	51	66	-15	41	**19th of 24**			R1	0-0-1					5,308
1960–61	**Football League**; **Fourth Division**	4	46	13	13	20	61	79	-18	39	**19th of 24**			R1	0-0-1	R1	0-0-1			4,446
1961–62	**Football League**; **Fourth Division**	4	44	22	8	14	64	63	+1	52	**4th of 23**; Promoted			R3	2-0-1	R1	0-1-1			6,664
1962–63	**Football League**; **Third Division**	3	46	13	9	24	61	89	-18	35	**23rd of 24**; Relegated			R3	2-0-1	R3	2-1-1			5,699
1963–64	**Football League**; **Fourth Division**	4	46	25	10	11	113	58	+55	60	**2nd of 24**; Promoted	**Hughie McIlmoyle**	**39**	R5	4-0-1	R2	1-0-1			8,346
1964–65	**Football League**; **Third Division**	3	46	25	10	11	76	53	+23	60	**1st of 24**; Promoted			R1	0-0-1	R3	2-1-1			10,789
1965–66	**Football League**; **Second Division**	2	42	17	5	20	60	63	-3	39	**14th of 22**			R4	1-2-1	R2	0-0-1			12,067
1966–67	**Football League**; **Second Division**	2	42	23	6	13	71	54	+17	52	**3rd of 22**			R4	1-0-1	QF	3-2-1			11,201
1967–68	**Football League**; **Second Division**	2	42	14	13	15	58	52	+6	41	**10th of 22**			R4	1-0-1	R2	0-0-1			10,414
1968–69	**Football League**; **Second Division**	2	42	16	10	16	46	49	-3	42	**12th of 22**			R3	0-0-1	R3	1-0-1			9,212
1969–70	**Football League**; **Second Division**	2	42	14	13	15	58	56	+2	41	**12th of 22**			R5	2-2-1	SF	5-1-1			9,388
1970–71	**Football League**; **Second Division**	2	42	20	13	9	65	43	+22	53	**4th of 22**			R4	1-0-1	R4	2-0-1			10,657
1971–72	**Football League**; **Second Division**	2	42	17	9	16	61	57	+4	43	**10th of 22**			R3	0-1-1	R3	1-0-1			9,479
1972–73	**Football League**; **Second Division**	2	42	11	12	19	50	52	-2	34	**18th of 22**			R5	2-2-1	R2	0-1-1			7,606
1973–74	**Football League**; **Second Division**	2	42	20	9	13	61	48	+13	49	**3rd of 22**; Promoted			R4	1-2-1	R3	2-1-1			8,270
1974–75	**Football League**; **First Division**	1	42	12	5	25	43	59	-16	29	**22nd of 22**; Relegated			QF	3-0-1	R3	1-0-1			14,530
1975–76	**Football League**; **Second Division**	2	42	12	13	17	45	59	-14	37	**19th of 22**			R3	0-0-1	R3	1-0-1			8,279
1976–77	**Football League**; **Second Division**	2	42	11	12	19	49	75	-26	34	**20th of 22**; Relegated			R4	1-0-1	R2	2-0-2			7,680
1977–78	**Football League**; **Third Division**	3	46	14	19	13	59	59	0	47	**13th of 24**			R3	2-1-1	R1	0-2-1			5,319
1978–79	**Football League**; **Third Division**	3	46	15	22	9	53	42	+11	52	**6th of 24**			R3	2-0-1	R1	0-1-1			5,204
1979–80	**Football League**; **Third Division**	3	46	18	12	16	66	56	+10	48	**6th of 24**			R4	3-2-1	R1	0-1-1			4,406
1980–81	**Football League**; **Third Division**	3	46	14	13	19	56	70	-14	41	**19th of 24**			R4	3-3-1	R2	1-1-2			4,064
1981–82	**Football League**; **Third Division**	3	46	23	11	12	65	50	+15	80	**2nd of 24**; Promoted			R3	2-1-1	R2	1-2-1			4,409
1982–83	**Football League**; **Second Division**	2	42	12	12	18	68	70	-2	48	**14th of 22**			R3	0-1-1	R1	0-1-1			5,944
1983–84	**Football League**; **Second Division**	2	42	16	16	10	48	41	+7	64	**7th of 22**			R3	0-1-1	R2	1-0-1			5,611
1984–85	**Football League**; **Second Division**	2	42	13	8	21	50	67	-17	47	**16th of 22**			R4	1-0-1	R2	0-0-2			4,016
1985–86	**Football League**; **Second Division**	2	42	13	7	22	47	71	-24	46	**20th of 22**; Relegated			R4	1-0-1	R1	0-1-1			4,010
1986–87	**Football League**; **Third Division**	3	46	10	8	28	39	78	-39	38	**22nd of 24**; Relegated			R1	0-1-1	R1	1-0-1	R1	2-0-1	2,644
1987–88	**Football League**; **Fourth Division**	4	46	12	8	26	57	86	-29	44	**23rd of 24**			R1	0-0-1	R2	3-0-1	R1	2-0-1	2,236
1988–89	**Football League**; **Fourth Division**	4	46	15	15	16	53	52	+1	60	**12th of 24**			R3	2-1-1	R1	0-1-1	G	0-1-1	3,176
1989–90	**Football League**; **Fourth Division**	4	46	21	8	17	61	60	+1	71	**8th of 24**			R2	1-0-1	R1	1-0-1	R1	1-1-1	4,740
1990–91	**Football League**; **Fourth Division**	4	46	13	9	24	47	89	-42	48	**20th of 24**			R1	0-0-1	R2	1-2-1	G	0-1-1	3,006
1991–92	**Football League**; **Fourth Division**	4	42	7	13	22	41	67	-26	34	**22nd of 22**			R1	0-1-1	R1	0-1-1	R1	1-1-1	2,481
Football League divisions renamed after the Premier League creation.
1992–93	**Football League**; **Third Division**	4	42	11	11	20	51	65	-14	44	**18th of 22**			R1	0-0-1	R2	1-2-1	G	1-0-1	3,611
1993–94	**Football League**; **Third Division**	4	42	18	10	14	57	42	+15	64	**7th of 22**			R3	2-1-1	R1	0-1-1	AF	6-0-1	5,524
1994–95	**Football League**; **Third Division**	4	42	27	10	5	67	31	+36	91	**1st of 22**; Promoted			R3	2-1-1	R2	1-0-3	F	6-0-2	7,422
1995–96	**Football League**; **Second Division**	3	46	12	13	21	57	72	-15	49	**21st of 24**; Relegated			R1	0-0-1	R1	1-0-1	AF	3-2-2	5,704
1996–97	**Football League**; **Third Division**	4	46	24	12	10	67	44	+23	84	**3rd of 24**; Promoted	Allan Smart	11	R4	3-0-1	R2	2-1-1	W	5-2-0	5,440
1997–98	**Football League**; **Second Division**	3	46	12	8	26	57	73	-16	44	**23rd of 24**; Relegated	Ian Stevens	17	R1	0-0-1	R2	2-0-2	AQF	2-0-1	5,381
1998–99	**Football League**; **Third Division**	4	46	11	16	19	43	53	-10	49	**23rd of 24**	Ian Stevens	9	R1	0-0-1	R1	0-0-2	AQF	0-1-1	3,319
**1999–2000**	**Football League**; **Third Division**	4	46	9	12	25	42	75	-33	39	**23rd of 24**	Steve Soley	8	R1	0-0-1	R1	0-1-1	ASF	2-0-1	3,192
2000–01	**Football League**; **Third Division**	4	46	11	15	20	42	65	-23	48	**22nd of 24**	Scott Dobie	11	R3	2-0-1	R1	0-1-1	R1	0-0-1	3,670
2001–02	**Football League**; **Third Division**	4	46	12	16	18	48	56	-8	52	**17th of 24**	Richie Foran	14	R2	1-1-1	R1	0-0-1	R1	0-0-1	3,204
2002–03	**Football League**; **Third Division**	4	46	13	10	23	52	78	-26	49	**22nd of 24**	Craig Farrell	11	R2	1-1-1	R1	0-0-1	F	4-1-1	4,776
2003–04	**Football League**; **Third Division**	4	46	12	9	25	46	69	-23	45	**23rd of 24**; Relegated	Craig Farrell; Brendan McGill	7	R1	0-0-1	R1	0-0-1	AQF	2-0-1	5,617
2004–05	**Conference**; **Premier**	5	42	20	13	9	74	37	+37	73	**3rd of 22**	Karl Hawley	13	R2	2-1-1	R5	2-0-1	R2	1-0-1	5,513
2004–05	**Conference**; **Premier**	5	Promoted through play-offs.											R2	2-1-1	R5	2-0-1	R2	1-0-1	5,513
2005–06	**Football**; **League Two**	4	46	25	11	10	84	42	+42	86	**1st of 24**; Promoted	**Karl Hawley**	**22**	R1	0-0-1	R1	0-0-1	F	3-2-2	7,218
2006–07	**Football**; **League One**	3	46	19	11	16	54	55	-1	68	**8th of 24**	Karl Hawley	12	R1	0-0-1	R2	0-1-1	R1	0-1-0	7,907
2007–08	**Football**; **League One**	3	46	23	11	12	64	46	+18	80	**4th of 24**	Joe Garner; Danny Graham	14	R1	0-1-1	R2	1-0-1	AQF	1-0-1	7,835
2007–08	**Football**; **League One**	3	Lost in the play-off semifinal.											R1	0-1-1	R2	1-0-1	AQF	1-0-1	7,835
2008–09	**Football**; **League One**	3	46	12	14	20	56	69	-13	50	**20th of 24**	Danny Graham	15	R2	1-1-1	R2	1-0-1	R2	0-1-0	6,268
2009–10	**Football**; **League One**	3	46	15	13	18	63	66	-3	58	**14th of 24**	Ian Harte	16	R3	2-1-1	R3	2-0-1	F	4-1-2	5,210
**2010–11**	**Football**; **League One**	3	46	16	11	19	60	62	-2	59	**12th of 24**	James Berrett	10	R3	2-0-1	R1	0-0-1	W	4-1-1	5,207
**2011–12**	**Football**; **League One**	3	46	18	15	13	65	66	-1	69	**8th of 24**	Lee Miller	14	R2	1-0-1	R2	0-1-1	R1	0-0-1	5,247
**2012–13**	**Football**; **League One**	3	46	14	13	19	56	77	-21	55	**17th of 24**	Lee Miller	9	R2	1-0-1	R3	2-0-1	R1	0-1-0	4,302
**2013–14**	**Football**; **League One**	3	46	11	12	23	43	76	-33	45	**22nd of 24**; Relegated	David Amoo	8	R3	2-1-1	R2	0-1-1	AQF	0-1-1	4,243
**2014–15**	**Football**; **League Two**	4	46	14	8	24	56	74	-18	50	**20th of 24**	Kyle Dempsey	10	R1	0-0-1	R1	0-0-1	R2	1-1-0	4,376
**2015–16**	**Football**; **League Two**	4	46	17	16	13	67	62	+5	67	**10th of 24**	Jabo Ibehre	15	R4	2-2-1	R3	2-1-0	R1	0-0-1	4,838
**2016–17**	**Football**; **League Two**	4	46	18	17	11	69	68	+1	71	**6th of 24**	Charlie Wyke	14	R2	1-0-1	R2	1-1-0	R2	3-0-1	5,114
**2016–17**	**Football**; **League Two**	4	Lost in the play-off semifinal.											R2	1-0-1	R2	1-1-0	R2	3-0-1	5,114
**2017–18**	**Football**; **League Two**	4	46	17	16	13	62	54	+8	67	**10th of 24**	Jamie Devitt	10	R3	2-2-1	R2	1-0-1	G	1-0-2	4,609
**2018–19**	**Football**; **League Two**	4	46	20	8	18	67	62	+5	68	**11th of 24**	Hallam Hope	14	R2	1-0-1	R1	0-0-1	GS	1-1-1	4,712
**2019–20**	**Football**; **League Two**	4	37	10	12	15	39	56	-17	42	**18th of 24**	Harry McKirdy; Olufela Olomola; Nathan Thomas	5	R3	2-2-1	R2	1-0-1	GS	1-0-2	4,140
**2020–21**	**Football**; **League Two**	4	46	18	12	16	60	51	+9	66	**10th of 24**	Jon Mellish	11	R2	0-1-1	R1	0-0-1	GS	1-0-2	– (Note: COVID-19 prevented fans from attending games)
**2021–22**	**Football**; **League Two**	4	46	14	11	21	39	62	-23	53	**20th of 24**	Omari Patrick	9	R2	1-0-1	R1	0-0-1	R3	2-2-1	4,966
**2022–23**	**Football**; **League Two**	4	46	20	16	10	66	43	+23	76	**5th of 24**	Kristian Dennis	20	R2	1-0-1	R1	0-0-1	GS	0-1-2	6,659
**2022–23**	**Football**; **League Two**	4	Promoted through play-offs.											R2	1-0-1	R1	0-0-1	GS	0-1-2	6,659
**2023–24**	**Football**; **League One**	3	46	7	9	30	41	81	-40	30	**24th of 24**; Relegated	Jordan Gibson	7	R1	0-0-1	R1	0-0-1	GS	1-0-2	8,000
**2024–25**	**Football League Two**	4	46	10	12	24	44	71	-27	42	**23rd of 24**; Relegated	Matthew Dennis	6	R1	0-0-1	R1	0-0-1	GS	1-0-2	7,332
**2025–26**	**National League**	5	46	29	8	9	87	51	+36	95	**3rd of 24**	Regan Linney	19	R2	2-0-1	R4	1-0-1			7,338
**2025–26**	**National League**	5	Lost in the play-off semifinal.											R2	2-0-1	R4	1-0-1			7,338
