= Alvin Bubb =

Grenada international footballer

Personal information
- Date of birth: 11 October 1980 (age 46)
- Place of birth: Paddington, England
- Position: Left winger

Youth career
- Queens Park Rangers

Senior career*
Years	Team	Apps	(Gls)
2000–2001	Queens Park Rangers	1	(0)
2001–2002	Bristol Rovers	13	(0)
2002	Billericay Town		
2002–2003	Slough Town	16	(2)
2003–2004	Aylesbury United	33	(6)
2004–2005	Wealdstone		

International career
- Grenada
- * Club domestic league appearances and goals

Alvin Ryan Bubb (born 11 October 1980) is a Grenadian international footballer who plays as a left winger.

== Early and personal life ==
Born in Paddington, England, Bubb is cousin to fellow players Byron Bubb and Bradley Bubb.

== Club career ==
Bubb made 14 appearances in the Football League for Queens Park Rangers and Bristol Rovers. He later played non-league football for Billericay Town, Slough Town, Aylesbury United and Wealdstone.

== International career ==
Bubb has earned international caps for Grenada.
