= Ernest Bubb =

Australian cricketer

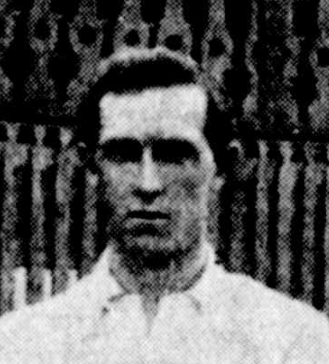

Personal information
- Born: 6 December 1884; Sydney, Australia
- Died: 26 November 1946 (aged 61); Neutral Bay, New South Wales, Australia
- Source: ESPNcricinfo, 23 December 2016

Ernest Bubb (6 December 1884 – 26 November 1946) was an Australian cricketer. He played five first-class matches for New South Wales between 1905/06 and 1908/09.

== See also ==
- List of New South Wales representative cricketers
