= Roy Bubb =

Australian cricketer

Personal information
- Born: 23 June 1900; Sydney, Australia
- Died: 4 April 1965 (aged 64); Hamilton, New South Wales, Australia
- Source: ESPNcricinfo, 23 December 2016

Roy Bubb (23 June 1900 – 4 April 1965) was an Australian cricketer. He played two first-class matches for New South Wales in 1924/25.

== See also ==
- List of New South Wales representative cricketers
