= Adrian Bubb =

Australian rugby league footballer

Personal information
- Full name: Adrian Bubb
- Born: 7 March 1967
- Died: 11 April 2023 (aged 56)

Playing information
Club
Years	Team	Pld	T	G	FG	P
1988	Newcastle Knights	1	0	0	0	0
- Source: As of 13 May 2023

Adrian Bubb was an Australian professional rugby league footballer who played in the 1980s. He played for the Newcastle Knights in 1988.
