= 2006–07 FA Cup =

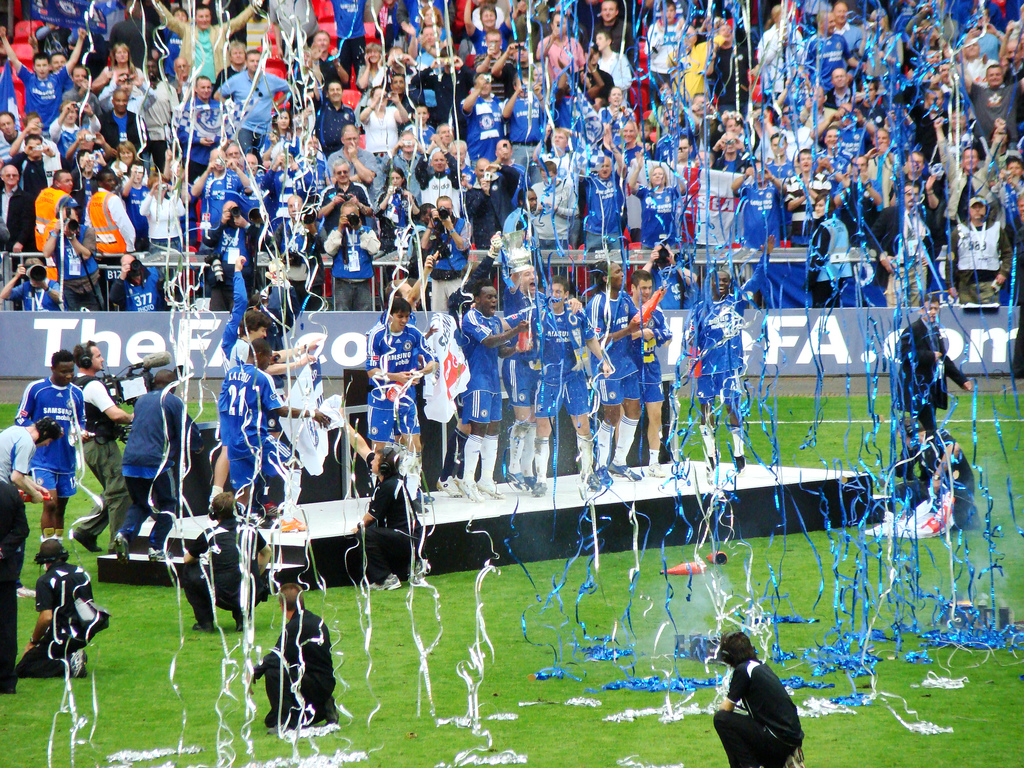
- Chelsea celebrating their 4th FA Cup title

Tournament details
- Country: England; Wales
- Teams: 687

Final positions
- Champions: Chelsea (4th title)
- Runners-up: Manchester United

Tournament statistics
- Top goal scorer: Frank Lampard (6 goals)

The 2006–07 FA Cup (known as the FA Cup sponsored by E.ON for sponsorship reasons) was the 126th staging of the world's oldest football knockout competition; the FA Cup. This season's edition was the first to be sponsored by E.ON.

The competition started on 18 August 2006 with the first of the record number of 687 teams entering in the Extra preliminary round and concluded on 19 May 2007 with the final, the first to be held at the new Wembley Stadium.

Chelsea defeated Manchester United 1–0 in the final, with Didier Drogba scoring the winning goal in the dying minutes of extra-time. Manchester United had played against top-flight opponents in each round, as they had when they won the Cup in 1948.

This was the last FA Cup (to date) at which the semi-finals were played at neutral club venues; since 2008 all FA Cup semi-finals have been played at Wembley Stadium.

== Calendar ==
Round	Date	Fixtures	Clubs	Byes/Exemptions	Prize money
Extra preliminary round	19 August 2006	129	687 → 558	none	£500
Preliminary round	2 September 2006	166	558 → 392	203: 227th–429th	£1,000
First round qualifying	16 September 2006	116	392 → 276	66: 161st–226th	£2,250
Second round qualifying	30 September 2006	80	276 → 196	44: 117th–160th	£3,750
Third round qualifying	14 October 2006	40	196 → 156	none	£5,000
Fourth round qualifying	28 October 2006	32	156 → 124	24: 93rd–116th	£10,000
First round proper	11 November 2006	40	124 → 84	48: 45th–92nd	£16,000
Second round proper	2 December 2006	20	84 → 64	none	£24,000
Third round proper	6 January 2007	32	64 → 32	44: 1st–44th	£40,000
Fourth round proper	27 January 2007	16	32 → 16	none	£60,000
Fifth round proper	17 February 2007	8	16 → 8	none	£120,000
Sixth round proper	10 March 2007	4	8 → 4	none	£300,000
Semi-finals	14 April 2007	2	4 → 2	none	£900,000
Final	19 May 2007	1	2 → 1	none	£1,000,000

== Qualifying rounds ==
All participating clubs that were not members of the Premier League or Football League entered the competition in the qualifying rounds to secure one of 32 places available in the first round proper.

The winners from the fourth qualifying round were Barrow, Stafford Rangers, Tamworth, Gainsborough Trinity, King's Lynn, York City, Fleetwood Town, Rushden & Diamonds, Burton Albion, Northwich Victoria, Farsley Celtic, Kettering Town, Morecambe, Kidderminster Harriers, Basingstoke Town, Lewes, Bishop's Stortford, Weymouth, Maidenhead United, Stevenage Borough, Woking, Clevedon Town, Newport County, Oxford United, Yeading, Aldershot Town, Exeter City, Leatherhead, Chelmsford City, Bromley, Salisbury City and Havant & Waterlooville.

Clevedon Town was appearing in the competition proper for the first time. Of the others, Basingstoke Town had last featured at this stage in 1998–99, King's Lynn had last done so in 1997-98, Bromley had last done so in 1996-97, Fleetwood Town in 1990-91, Leatherhead in 1980-81, Farsley Celtic in 1974-75 and Maidenhead United in 1971-72.

== First round proper ==
Football League clubs from League One and League Two entered the competition at this stage. The draw was made by Will Greenwood and Neil Back, adjudicated by Trevor Brooking. Step 8 side Leatherhead, of the Isthmian League First Division South, was the lowest-ranked team in the round.

Matches were played on weekend of Saturday, 11 November 2006.

Tie no	Home team	Score	Away team	Attendance
1	AFC Bournemouth (3)	4–0	Boston United (4)	4,263
2	Wycombe Wanderers (4)	2–1	Oxford United (5)	6,279
3	Peterborough United (4)	3–0	Rotherham United (3)	4,281
4	Torquay United (4)	2–1	Leatherhead (8)	2,218
5	Morecambe (5)	2–1	Kidderminster Harriers (5)	1,673
6	Tranmere Rovers (3)	4–2	Woking (5)	4,591
7	Salisbury City (6)	3–0	Fleetwood Town (7)	2,684
8	Chelmsford City (7)	1–1	Aldershot Town (5)	2,838
replay	Aldershot Town (5)	2–0	Chelmsford City (7)	2,731
9	Weymouth (5)	2–2	Bury (4)	2,503
replay	Bury (4)	4–3	Weymouth (5)	2,231
10	Nottingham Forest (3)	5–0	Yeading (6)	7,704
11	Stafford Rangers (5)	1–1	Maidenhead United (7)	1,526
replay	Maidenhead United (7)	0–2	Stafford Rangers (5)	1,934
12	Shrewsbury Town (4)	0–0	Hereford United (4)	5,574
replay	Hereford United (4)	2–0	Shrewsbury Town (4)	4,224
13	Northampton Town (3)	0–0	Grimsby Town (4)	4,092
replay	Grimsby Town (4)	0–2	Northampton Town (3)	2,657
14	Wrexham (4)	1–0	Stevenage Borough (5)	2,863
15	Chesterfield (3)	0–1	Basingstoke Town (6)	3,539
16	Gainsborough Trinity (6)	1–3	Barnet (4)	1,914
17	Lewes (6)	1–4	Darlington (4)	2,000
18	Clevedon Town (7)	1–4	Chester City (4)	2,261
19	Barrow (6)	2–3	Bristol Rovers (4)	2,939
20	Rushden & Diamonds (5)	3–1	Yeovil Town (3)	2,530
21	Burton Albion (5)	1–2	Tamworth (5)	4,150
22	Farsley Celtic (6)	0–0	Milton Keynes Dons (4)	2,200
replay	Milton Keynes Dons (4)	2–0	Farsley Celtic (6)	2,676
23	Brentford (3)	0–1	Doncaster Rovers (3)	3,607
24	Gillingham (3)	4–1	Bromley (7)	5,547
25	York City (5)	0–1	Bristol City (3)	3,525
26	Bishop's Stortford (6)	3–5	King's Lynn (7)	1,750
27	Exeter City (5)	1–2	Stockport County (4)	4,454
28	Newport County (6)	1–3	Swansea City (3)	4,660
29	Kettering Town (6)	3–4	Oldham Athletic (3)	3,481
30	Rochdale (4)	1–1	Hartlepool United (4)	2,098
replay	Hartlepool United (4)	0–0	Rochdale (4)	2,788
Hartlepool United won 4–2 on penalties
31	Brighton & Hove Albion (3)	8–0	Northwich Victoria (5)	4,487
32	Mansfield Town (4)	1–0	Accrington Stanley (4)	3,909
33	Cheltenham Town (3)	0–0	Scunthorpe United (3)	2,721
replay	Scunthorpe United (3)	2–0	Cheltenham Town (3)	3,074
34	Macclesfield Town (4)	0–0	Walsall (4)	2,018
replay	Walsall (4)	0–1	Macclesfield Town (4)	3,114
35	Bradford City (3)	4–0	Crewe Alexandra (3)	3,483
36	Leyton Orient (3)	2–1	Notts County (4)	3,011
37	Swindon Town (4)	3–1	Carlisle United (3)	4,938
38	Huddersfield Town (3)	0–1	Blackpool (3)	6,597
39	Havant & Waterlooville (6)	1–2	Millwall (3)	5,793
40	Port Vale (3)	2–1	Lincoln City (4)	3,884

== Second round proper ==
Matches played on weekend of Saturday, 2 December 2006. The draw was made on 12 November by Graham Gooch and Mike Gatting, adjudicated by Trevor Brooking, and televised live on BBC One. King's Lynn, from the Southern League Premier Division at Step 7, was the lowest-ranked team in the round.

As mentioned below, Bury defeated Chester City 3–1 at the Deva Stadium but it was soon revealed that Bury had fielded an ineligible player, resulting in them being expelled from the competition and Chester City being reinstated.

Tie no	Home team	Score	Away team	Attendance
1	Milton Keynes Dons (4)	0–2	Blackpool (3)	3,837
2	Scunthorpe United (3)	0–2	Wrexham (4)	5,054
3	Brighton & Hove Albion (3)	3–0	Stafford Rangers (5)	5,741
4	Bristol City (3)	4–3	Gillingham (3)	5,663
5	Hereford United (4)	4–0	Port Vale (3)	4,076
6	Macclesfield Town (4)	2–1	Hartlepool United (4)	1,992
7	Stockport County (4)	2–1	Wycombe Wanderers (4)	3,821
8	Bury (4)	2–2	Chester City (4)	3,428
replay	Chester City (4)	1–3	Bury (4)	2,810
Bury expelled for fielding an ineligible player; Chester City progress
9	Barnet (4)	4–1	Northampton Town (3)	2,786
10	Tranmere Rovers (3)	1–2	Peterborough United (4)	6,308
11	King's Lynn (7)	0–2	Oldham Athletic (3)	5,444
12	Darlington (4)	1–3	Swansea City (3)	4,183
13	Salisbury City (6)	1–1	Nottingham Forest (3)	3,100
replay	Nottingham Forest (3)	2–0	Salisbury City (6)	6,177
14	Torquay United (4)	1–1	Leyton Orient (3)	2,392
replay	Leyton Orient (3)	1–2	Torquay United (4)	2,384
15	Bristol Rovers (4)	1–1	AFC Bournemouth (3)	6,252
replay	AFC Bournemouth (3)	0–1	Bristol Rovers (4)	4,153
16	Bradford City (3)	0–0	Millwall (3)	4,346
replay	Millwall (3)	0–0	Bradford City (3)	3,220
Millwall win 1 – 0 after extra time
17	Swindon Town (4)	1–0	Morecambe (5)	5,942
18	Mansfield Town (4)	1–1	Doncaster Rovers (3)	4,837
replay	Doncaster Rovers (3)	2–0	Mansfield Town (4)	5,338
19	Aldershot Town (5)	1–1	Basingstoke Town (6)	4,525
replay	Basingstoke Town (6)	1–3	Aldershot Town (5)	3,300
20	Rushden & Diamonds (5)	1–2	Tamworth (5)	2,815

== Third round proper ==
This round marks the point at which the Premier League and Football League Championship teams entered the competition. The draw was made on 3 December 2006 by Amir Khan and Ricky Hatton, adjudicated by Trevor Brooking, and televised live on BBC One. Conference National (Step 5) sides Aldershot Town and Tamworth were the lowest-ranked teams in the round and the last non-league clubs left in the competition.

Matches were played on the weekend of Saturday, 6 January 2007 with replays taking place during the week of 16 and 17 January (with the exception of the Luton – QPR replay, which was postponed due to a waterlogged pitch).

Tie no	Home team	Score	Away team	Attendance
1	Blackpool (3)	4–2	Aldershot Town (5)	6,355
2	Barnet (4)	2–1	Colchester United (2)	3,075
3	Sheffield United (1)	0–3	Swansea City (3)	15,896
4	Reading (1)	3–2	Burnley (2)	11,514
5	Portsmouth (1)	2–1	Wigan Athletic (1)	14,336
6	Doncaster Rovers (3)	0–4	Bolton Wanderers (1)	14,297
7	West Ham United (1)	3–0	Brighton & Hove Albion (3)	32,874
8	Leicester City (2)	2–2	Fulham (1)	15,499
replay	Fulham (1)	4–3	Leicester City (2)	11,222
9	Derby County (2)	3–1	Wrexham (4)	15,609
10	Wolverhampton Wanderers (2)	2–2	Oldham Athletic (3)	14,524
replay	Oldham Athletic (3)	0–2	Wolverhampton Wanderers (2)	9,628
11	Chester City (4)	0–0	Ipswich Town (2)	4,330
replay	Ipswich Town (2)	1–0	Chester City (4)	11,732
12	Manchester United (1)	2–1	Aston Villa (1)	74,924
13	Sheffield Wednesday (2)	1–1	Manchester City (1)	28,487
replay	Manchester City (1)	2–1	Sheffield Wednesday (2)	25,621
14	Tamworth (5)	1–4	Norwich City (2)	3,165
15	Nottingham Forest (3)	2–0	Charlton Athletic (1)	19,017
16	Cardiff City (2)	0–0	Tottenham Hotspur (1)	20,376
replay	Tottenham Hotspur (1)	4–0	Cardiff City (2)	27,641
17	Preston North End (2)	1–0	Sunderland (2)	10,318
18	Liverpool (1)	1–3	Arsenal (1)	43,619
19	Bristol Rovers (4)	1–0	Hereford United (4)	8,978
20	Watford (1)	4–1	Stockport County (4)	11,745
21	Crystal Palace (2)	2–1	Swindon Town (4)	10,238
22	Bristol City (3)	3–3	Coventry City (2)	13,336
replay	Coventry City (2)	0–2	Bristol City (3)	13,055
23	Peterborough United (4)	1–1	Plymouth Argyle (2)	6,255
replay	Plymouth Argyle (2)	2–1	Peterborough United (4)	9,973
24	Queens Park Rangers (2)	2–2	Luton Town (2)	10,064
replay	Luton Town (2)	1–0	Queens Park Rangers (2)	7,494
25	Southend United (2)	1–1	Barnsley (2)	5,485
replay	Barnsley (2)	0–2	Southend United (2)	4,944
26	West Bromwich Albion (2)	3–1	Leeds United (2)	16,957
27	Hull City (2)	1–1	Middlesbrough (1)	17,520
replay	Middlesbrough (1)	4–3	Hull City (2)	16,702
28	Birmingham City (2)	2–2	Newcastle United (1)	16,444
replay	Newcastle United (1)	1–5	Birmingham City (2)	26,099
29	Torquay United (4)	0–2	Southampton (2)	5,396
30	Everton (1)	1–4	Blackburn Rovers (1)	24,426
31	Chelsea (1)	6–1	Macclesfield Town (4)	41,434
32	Stoke City (2)	2–0	Millwall (3)	8,024

== Fourth round proper ==
Matches played on weekend of Saturday, 27 January 2007. The draw was made on 8 January by Hope Powell and Faye White, adjudicated by Trevor Brooking, and televised live on BBC Two and Sky Sports News. League Two sides Barnet and Bristol Rovers were the lowest-ranked teams in the round.

Tie no	Home team	Score	Away team	Attendance
1	Arsenal (1)	1–1	Bolton Wanderers (1)	59,778
replay	Bolton Wanderers (1)	1–1	Arsenal (1)	21,088
Arsenal win 3 – 1 after extra time
2	West Ham United (1)	0–1	Watford (1)	31,168
3	Bristol City (3)	2–2	Middlesbrough (1)	19,008
replay	Middlesbrough (1)	1–1	Bristol City (3)	26,328
2 – 2 after extra time – Middlesbrough win 5 – 4 on penalties
4	Chelsea (1)	3–0	Nottingham Forest (3)	41,516
5	Ipswich Town (2)	1–0	Swansea City (3)	16,635
6	Tottenham Hotspur (1)	3–1	Southend United (2)	33,406
7	Barnet (4)	0–2	Plymouth Argyle (2)	5,204
8	Birmingham City (2)	2–3	Reading (1)	20,041
9	Derby County (2)	1–0	Bristol Rovers (4)	25,033
10	Manchester City (1)	3–1	Southampton (2)	26,496
11	Crystal Palace (2)	0–2	Preston North End (2)	8,422
12	Manchester United (1)	2–1	Portsmouth (1)	71,137
13	Blackpool (3)	1–1	Norwich City (2)	9,491
replay	Norwich City (2)	1–1	Blackpool (3)	19,120
Norwich City win 3 – 2 after extra time
14	Luton Town (2)	0–4	Blackburn Rovers (1)	5,887
15	Wolverhampton Wanderers (2)	0–3	West Bromwich Albion (2)	28,107
16	Fulham (1)	3–0	Stoke City (2)	11,059

== Fifth round proper ==
Matches played on the weekend of Saturday, 17 February 2007. The draw took place on Monday, 29 January 2007 and was made by Darren Campbell and Roger Black, adjudicated by Trevor Brooking, and televised live on BBC Two and Sky Sports News. The round featured ten clubs from the Premier League and six from the Football League Championship.

Tie no	Home team	Score	Away team	Attendance
1	Chelsea (1)	4–0	Norwich City (2)	41,537
2	Watford (1)	1–0	Ipswich Town (2)	17,016
3	Preston North End (2)	1–3	Manchester City (1)	18,890
4	Plymouth Argyle (2)	2–0	Derby County (2)	18,026
5	Manchester United (1)	1–1	Reading (1)	70,608
replay	Reading (1)	2–3	Manchester United (1)	23,821
6	Arsenal (1)	0–0	Blackburn Rovers (1)	56,761
replay	Blackburn Rovers (1)	1–0	Arsenal (1)	18,882
7	Middlesbrough (1)	2–2	West Bromwich Albion (2)	31,491
replay	West Bromwich Albion (2)	1–1	Middlesbrough (1)	24,925
1 – 1 after extra time – Middlesbrough win 5 – 4 on penalties
8	Fulham (1)	0–4	Tottenham Hotspur (1)	18,655

== Sixth round proper ==
Matches played on the weekend of Saturday, 10 March 2007. The draw for the round, also known as the quarter-finals, took place on Monday, 19 February 2007 at 1:30pm GMT. The draw was made by Steve McClaren and Terry Venables, adjudicated by Trevor Brooking and televised live on BBC Two. This was the last round in which matches were held on the home grounds of one of the teams. The only non-Premier League team to reach the quarter-finals this season were Plymouth Argyle.

10 March 2007
17:30

Middlesbrough (1)	2–2	Manchester United (1)
Cattermole 44'; Boateng 47'	(Report)	Rooney 23'; Ronaldo 68' (pen.)

Riverside Stadium, Middlesbrough
Attendance: 33,308
Referee: Rob Styles (Hampshire)
11 March 2007
12:45

Chelsea (1)	3–3	Tottenham Hotspur (1)
Lampard 22', 71'; Kalou 86'	(Report)	Berbatov 5'; Essien 28' (o.g.); Ghaly 36'

Stamford Bridge, London
Attendance: 41,517
Referee: Mike Riley (West Yorkshire)
11 March 2007
16:00

Blackburn Rovers (1)	2–0	Manchester City (1)
Mokoena 28'; Derbyshire 90'	(Report)

Ewood Park, Blackburn
Attendance: 27,743
Referee: Mike Dean (Cheshire)
11 March 2007
18:00

Plymouth Argyle (2)	0–1	Watford (1)
	(Report)	Bouazza 21'

Home Park, Plymouth
Attendance: 20,652
Referee: Chris Foy (Merseyside)

=== Replays ===
19 March 2007
20:00

Manchester United (1)	1–0	Middlesbrough (1)
Ronaldo 76' (pen.)	(Report)

Old Trafford, Manchester
Attendance: 71,325
Referee: Mike Dean (Cheshire)
19 March 2007
20:05

Tottenham Hotspur (1)	1–2	Chelsea (1)
Keane 76' (pen.)	(Report)	Shevchenko 54'; Wright-Phillips 61'

White Hart Lane, London
Attendance: 35,519
Referee: Martin Atkinson (West Yorkshire)

== Semi-finals ==
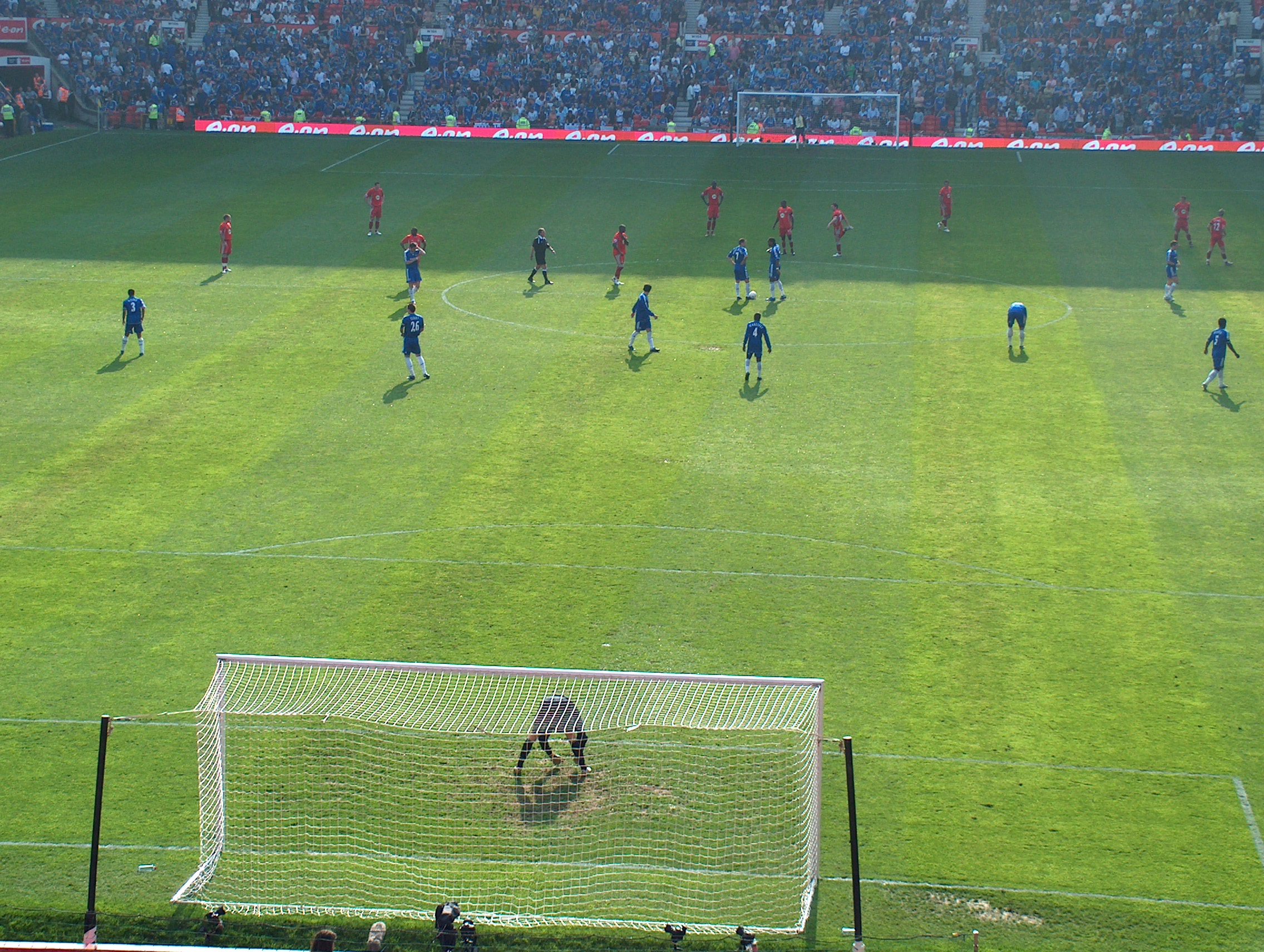
Kick off at Chelsea vs Blackburn Rovers

Unlike earlier rounds, matches were played on neutral grounds on the weekend of Saturday, 14 April 2007. There would be no replays even if the matches were drawn; instead, extra time would decide winners immediately thereafter. Only if extra time did not decide the winners, a penalty shootout would decide winners. The draw for the semi-finals took place on Monday, 12 March 2007 at 1:30pm GMT. The draw was made by Ray Clemence, and adjudicated by Trevor Brooking.

14 April 2007
17:30

Watford (1)	1–4	Manchester United (1)
Bouazza 26'	(Report)	Rooney 7', 66'; Ronaldo 28'; Richardson 82'

Villa Park, Birmingham
Attendance: 37,425
Referee: Howard Webb (Sheffield & Hallamshire)
15 April 2007
16:00

Blackburn Rovers (1)	1–2 (a.e.t.)	Chelsea (1)
Roberts 64'	(Report)	Lampard 16'; Ballack 109'

Old Trafford, Manchester
Attendance: 50,559
Referee: Alan Wiley (Staffordshire)

== Final ==
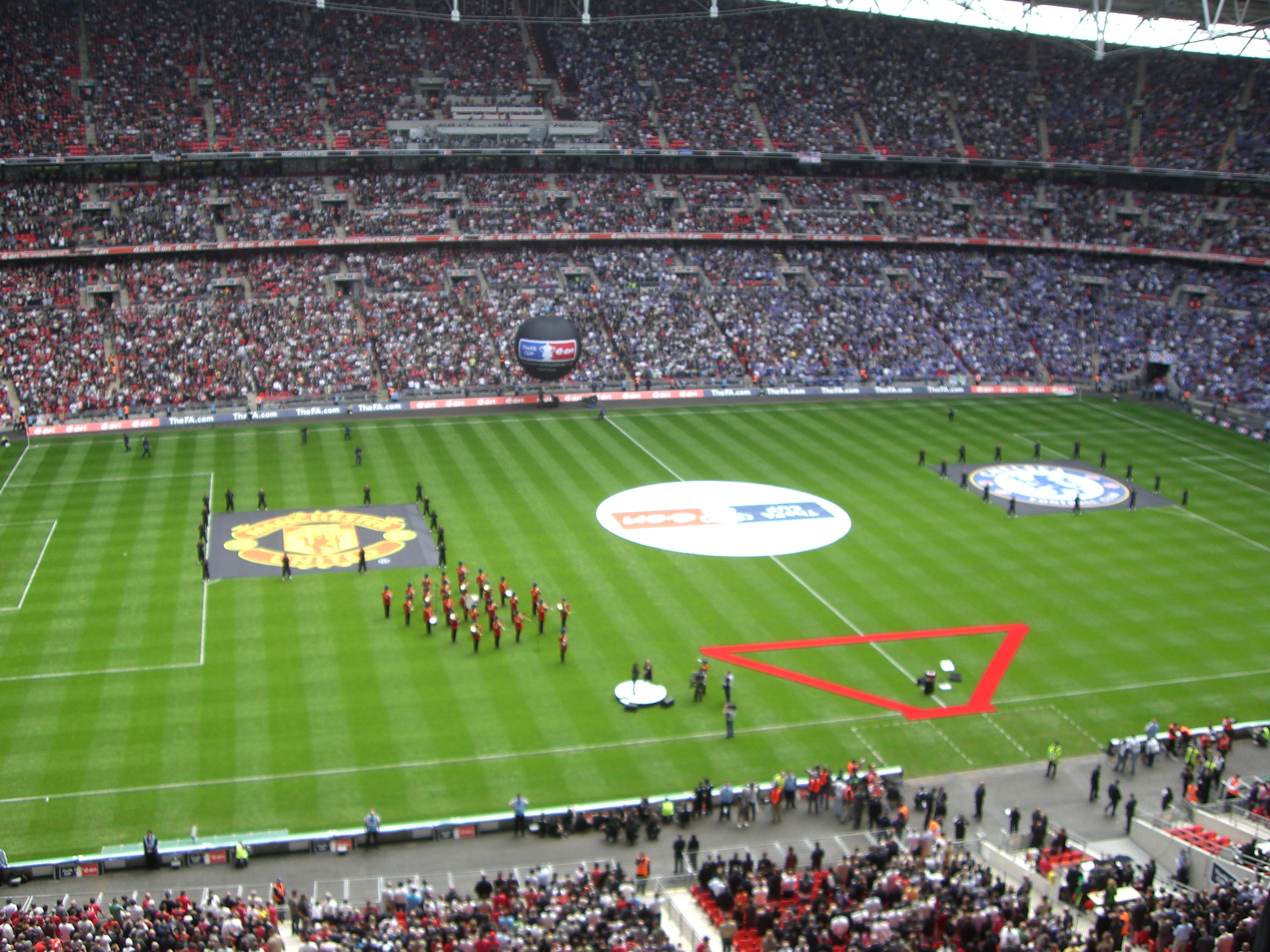
Chelsea and Manchester United line up before the 2006-07 FA Cup Final - the first at the new Wembley Stadium.

The 126th FA Cup final was played at the new Wembley Stadium and it was the first FA Cup Final to be played in London since 2000. Similarly to the semi-finals, there would be no replay even if the match was drawn; instead, extra time would be used to decide the winners. If extra time failed to separate the two sides, the match would go to penalties. Chelsea's victory ended Manchester United's hopes of becoming the only English club to win the double four times (having previously won it in 1994, 1996 and 1999), and in doing so, completed their own cup-double.

19 May 2007
15:00

Chelsea	1–0 (a.e.t.)	Manchester United
Drogba 116'	(Report)

Wembley Stadium, London
Attendance: 89,826
Referee: Steve Bennett (Kent)
- Assistant Referees:
  - Peter Kirkup (Northamptonshire)
  - Dave Bryan (Lincolnshire)
- Fourth official: Howard Webb (Sheffield & Hallamshire)

== Top scorers ==
As of 15 April 2007

Rank	Player	Club	Goals
1	(England) Frank Lampard	Chelsea	6
2	(England) Andy Bishop	Bury	5
2	(England) Darren Huckerby	Norwich City	5
2	(Republic of Ireland) Robbie Keane	Tottenham Hotspur	5
2	(England) Wayne Rooney	Manchester United	5
2	(Australia) Mark Viduka	Middlesbrough	5
7	(Nigeria) Yakubu	Middlesbrough	4
7	(England) Matt Derbyshire	Blackburn Rovers	4
7	(England) Phil Jevons	Bristol City	4
7	(England) Leroy Lita	Reading	4
7	(England) Jake Robinson	Brighton & Hove Albion	4
7	(England) Richard Walker	Bristol Rovers	4

== Player of the Round ==
Round	Player	Club
1Q	Matt Lewis	Halesowen Town
2Q	Gary McPhee	Nuneaton Borough
3Q	Byron Bubb	AFC Wimbledon
4Q	Paul Booth	Lewes
1	Kris Commons	Nottingham Forest
2	Phil Jevons	Bristol City
3	Jason Puncheon	Barnet
4	Jamie McAllister	Bristol City
5	Adam Federici	Reading
6	Frank Lampard	Chelsea
Semi-finals	Wayne Rooney	Manchester United

== Media coverage ==
In the United Kingdom, the BBC were the free to air broadcasters for the sixth consecutive season while Sky Sports were the subscription broadcasters for the nineteenth consecutive season.

The matches shown live on the BBC were:

Weymouth 2-2 Bury (R1)

Salisbury City 1-1 Nottingham Forest (R2)

Tamworth 1-4 Norwich City (R3)

Liverpool 1-3 Arsenal (R3)

Manchester United 2-1 Aston Villa (R3)

Newcastle United 1-5 Birmingham City (R3 Replay)

Luton Town 0-4 Blackburn Rovers (R4)

Manchester United 2-1 Portsmouth (R4)

Chelsea 3-0 Nottingham Forest (R4)

Bolton Wanderers 1-3 Arsenal (R4 Replay)

Arsenal 0-0 Blackburn Rovers (R5)

Manchester United 1-1 Reading (R5)

Preston North End 1-3 Manchester City (R5)

Reading 2-3 Manchester United (R5 Replay)

Middlesbrough 2-2 Manchester United (QF)

Chelsea 3-3 Tottenham Hotspur (QF)

Plymouth Argyle 0-1 Watford (QF)

Tottenham Hotspur 1-2 Chelsea (QF Replay)

Watford 1-4 Manchester United (SF)

Chelsea 1-0 Manchester United (Final)

The matches shown live on Sky Sports were:

Macclesfield Town 0-0 Walsall (R1)

Hartlepool United 0-0 Rochdale (R1 Replay)

King's Lynn 0-2 Oldham Athletic (R2)

Nottingham Forest 2-0 Salisbury City (R2 Replay)

Cardiff City 0-0 Tottenham Hotspur (R3)

Manchester City 2-1 Sheffield Wednesday (R3 Replay)

Arsenal 1-1 Bolton Wanderers (R4)

Middlesbrough 2-2 Bristol City (R4 Replay)

Fulham 0-4 Tottenham Hotspur (R5)

Blackburn Rovers 1-0 Arsenal (R5 Replay)

Blackburn Rovers 2-0 Manchester City (QF)

Manchester United 1-0 Middlesbrough (QF Replay)

Blackburn Rovers 1-2 Chelsea (SF)

Chelsea 1-0 Manchester United (Final)
