= Bradley Bubb =

Footballer (born 1988)

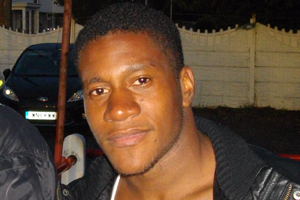
- Bubb in 2011

Personal information
- Date of birth: 30 May 1988 (age 38)
- Place of birth: Harrow, England
- Height: 5 ft 7 in (1.70 m)
- Position: Striker

Team information
- Current team: Northwood

Senior career*
Years	Team	Apps	(Gls)
2004–2005	Hendon	1	(0)
2005–2006	Queens Park Rangers	0	(0)
2006	→ Hendon (loan)	6	(0)
2006–2008	Chalfont St Peter	82	(52)
2008–2009	Beaconsfield SYCOB	42	(32)
2009–2011	Farnborough	88	(40)
2011–2013	Aldershot Town	9	(0)
2011–2012	→ Basingstoke Town (loan)	7	(2)
2012	→ Eastleigh (loan)	18	(10)
2012–2013	→ Woking (loan)	36	(18)
2013–2014	Royal Antwerp	4	(0)
2014	Aldershot Town	19	(3)
2014–2015	Havant & Waterlooville	35	(8)
2015–2016	Oxford City	33	(18)
2016–2018	Ebbsfleet United	37	(14)
2018	Wealdstone	27	(8)
2023–2024	Rayners Lane	29	(11)
2024	Northwood (dual-registration)	1	(0)
2026–	Northwood	1	(1)

International career
2010–2012	Grenada	10	(0)
- * Club domestic league appearances and goals

Bradley Joseph Bubb (born 30 May 1988) is a footballer who plays as a striker. Born in England, he represented Grenada at international level. Besides England, he has played in Belgium.

== Club career ==
Born in Harrow, Bubb spent his early career with Hendon and Queens Park Rangers. Bubb later played non-league football for Chalfont St Peter, Beaconsfield SYCOB and Farnborough. He moved to Aldershot Town on 6 June 2011, signing a two-year contract. He made his debut for Aldershot on 13 August 2011, in the Football League.

On Monday 9 January 2012, following the expiration of his loan at Conference South side Basingstoke Town, Bubb joined another Conference South side, Eastleigh, on loan for the rest of the season. Bubb won the Conference South Player of the Month award in February 2012.

He also spent a loan spell at Woking, and after leaving Aldershot, played in Belgium for Royal Antwerp. He then re-signed for Aldershot in January 2014, before being released at the end of the season. He then signed for Havant & Waterlooville, netting 11 times in 44 appearances, and Oxford City in June 2015.

On 23 June 2016, Bubb joined National League South side Ebbsfleet United on a one-year deal.

On 23 February 2018, he signed for National League South side Wealdstone on an 18-month deal. He made his debut the following day in Wealdstone's FA Trophy quarter final away to Billericay Town, where he scored a hat trick in a 5–2 win. Bubb scored a total of 12 goals before leaving the club.

=== Rayners Lane ===
After 5 years out of the game, Bubb signed for Rayners Lane in the summer of 2023. Bubb later played one game on dual-registration at Northwood in August 2024.

=== Northwood ===
Bubb rejoined Northwood, now a Combined Counties Football League side, in the summer of 2026. He made a scoring debut in their 2-0 win over Holyport on 1 August 2026.

== International career ==
Bubb made his international debut for Grenada on 26 November 2010.

== Personal life ==
Bubb is the younger brother of Byron Bubb, and cousin to Alvin Bubb.
