= David Ellery =

- Born: Bromley, Kent, England, UK
- Occupations: Documentary Film-maker, director, writer, and presenter/voice-over person.
- Known for: Documentaries and as an author of maritime books.
- Spouse(s): Shan (married 1995 – present)
- Children: 3
- Website: David ElleryViewpoint Productions

David Ellery is a documentary filmmaker, director and writer, author and ship historian based in Hampshire. He has written and produced/ directed a variety of stand-alone documentaries and five series' for television and is credited with more than 150 published magazine articles and several books. A new edition of RMS Queen Mary 101 Questions & Answers was launched by Bloomsbury in 2022. He also appears as part of the on-screen team for The Great British Home Movie Roadshow, first broadcast in August and September 2010. In 2011 he received his second Royal Television Society Award. Recent work includes the documentary: P&O Cruises - Celebrating 175 Years of Heritage, which he wrote, edited and directed, a short film with actors Sarah Parish and husband James Murray about the Murray Parish Trust [2015], The Ultimate Challenge - a 6-part travel/ roadshow series for television [2016] and Wattisham Both Sides of the Fence, the story of an airfield with a unique place in British aviation history [2017], which Ellery wrote, narrated, filmed and edited, and for which he received his third RTS Award [2018]. In 2019 David Ellery wrote, narrated and directed Britain's Last Paddle Steamers, followed by Cold War East Anglia - the front line, a broadcast quality documentary [2020]. Ellery's background is in writing. As a freelance feature writer, David Ellery contributed to various regional and national magazines and newspapers, including Women's Realm, Woman & Home, Homes & Gardens and the Express newspaper group. His work featured celebrity interviews with stars like Stefanie Powers, Heather Lockyear, Peter Davison and Sir Norman Wisdom, and articles on topics like travel, art, and motoring. In September 1992, David Ellery became the Motoring Correspondent for regional radio station Spire FM in Salisbury, where he covered motoring events like the London Motorshow and presented a weekly segment. He later moved into television production, scripting and voice-over work. David Ellery has also been commissioned by EMTAS (Ethnic Minority and Traveller Achievement Service) to produce several educational films. These include programmes designed to introduce and support initiatives such as the awardwinning Young Interpreters Scheme and New Arrivals Ambassadors, aimed at assisting schools across the UK. David's recent written works include maritime history feature articles for the national publication Ship's Monthly (2024) and a complete rework and rerelease of RMS Queen Mary The world's Favourite Liner (Seaforth Publications, 2024). The comprehensive history book was nominated for a literary award by the Society For Nautical Research in 2025. This updated version of the book has been completely revamped to include a significant range of additional images, and rewritten to include further information and additional interviews as well as a complete update of the ship's long history. To accompany the book David Ellery also released a new, longer and updated version of Queen Mary - Regal & Retired, the awardwinning documentary which he originally made for the BBC (DVD or stream, Viewpoint Productions).

== Works ==
=== Television ===
- The Ultimate Challenge (2016). A 6-part travel/ roadshow documentary series: written, narrated and edited by David Ellery.
- The Great British Home Movie Roadshow (since 2010). Broadcast on BBC2, this 5-part series featuring amateur cine footage spans 100 years of the nation's history. David Ellery is one of the programme's presenters and on-screen 'experts'.
- Beechings Tracks (2008) part of the BBC's recent Railway Season. This programme explores the impact of Dr Richard Beeching's infamous railway cuts of the 1960s on the south of England, known as the Beeching Axe. Shown on BBC1 in October 2008.
- Regal & Retired (2006) a documentary for Viewpoint Productions. Made for the BBC, this programme marked the 70th anniversary of RMS Queen Mary, the last 1930s 'superliner'. Shown on BBC1 in May 2006 and BBC Scotland July 2006. Narrated by Julie Peasgood.
- In The Past (Series 1): written, produced, directed and narrated by David Ellery, the series features archive film footage from the 1920s-1960s. First broadcast in 2000 on ITV1.
- In the Past (Series 2): Further programmes in a similar vein to the first series. First broadcast in 2001 on ITV1.
- In The Past (Series 3): A 15-part series featuring archive film sequences from as early as 1896 to approximately 1969, covering a wide range of themes from the development of air travel and family motoring to life during World War II and employment. First broadcast in 2003 on ITV1.
- Classic Liners: A six-part series depicting classic ocean liners and liner travel using archive film from the 1960s and 70s and contemporary footage. First broadcast 2002.

=== On Demand & DVDs ===
Programmes for TV that David Ellery is associated with have in a number of cases become available On Demand and/ or on DVD. The In The Past series' were re-edited so programmes focus on geographical regions rather than theme and Classic Liners has also been released via three individual disks More recently, P&O Cruises - Celebrating 175 Years of Heritage [2012] was released, along with Kingswear Castle - A Voyage through her Life (the history of Britain's last coal-fired paddle steamer in operation - released by CPA Ltd) [2015] The Ultimate Challenge - 6-part roadtrip series [2016] and Wattisham, Both Sides of the Fence - the story of an airfield with a unique place in British aviation history [2017]. Britain's Last Paddle Steamers [2019] Cold War East Anglia - the frontline, [2020] and RMS Queen Mary - Regal & Retired, (longer, reedited and updated version) [2024].

=== Books ===
- RMS Queen Mary - The World's Favourite Liner (New, comprehensively revised edition, Seaforth Publications, 2024)
- RMS Queen Mary, 101 Questions & Answers New Edition (Bloomsbury, Adlard Coles ISBN 978-1-4729-9311-3, November 2021)
- RMS Queen Mary, 101 Questions & Answers (Conway, Anova Books, June 2006)
- RMS Queen Mary - The World's Favourite Liner (Waterfront Publications, 1994)
- QE2 - The Last Great Liner (Waterfront Publications, September 1993)
- Real Howard's Way (Ellery was responsible for photo illustrations only) (Milestone, September 1988)

=== Radio ===
In September 1992 Ellery became the Motoring Correspondent for regional radio station Spire FM in Salisbury, when the station first went on air. In this role he reported on a wide range of motoring topics from events like the London Motorshow and presented a weekly slot, which included test-drives, reviews and motoring advice.

=== Awards ===
- Royal Television Society Awards

(2018) Won Best Non Broadcast Programme (View-on-Demand Programme) for Wattisham: Both Sides of the Fence

(2013) Nominated for Best Director

(2012) Nominated for Best in Category for P&O Cruises - Celebrating 175 Years of Heritage.

(2011) Won - "Best Non News Multi-Skills Award" (For abilities in TV Directing, Producing, Editing, Scripting and Narration/Presenting).

(2007) Won - "Best Popular Factual Programme" for Regal & Retired - the Story of RMS Queen Mary
