= Frank W. Bubb Sr. =

American mathematician

Frank Bubb (July 3, 1892 – May 3, 1961) was a scientist and a mathematician at Washington University in St. Louis. He was a part of the team that developed the cyclotron that produced the first batch of plutonium for the then secret program only referred to as the Manhattan Project, which produced the atomic bomb.
