= Byron Bubb =

Grenada international footballer

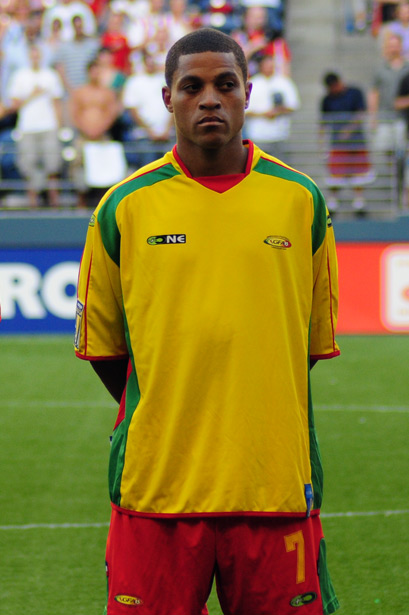

Personal information
- Date of birth: 17 December 1981 (age 44)
- Place of birth: Harrow, England
- Height: 5 ft 3 in (1.60 m)
- Position: Midfielder

Team information
- Current team: Barton Rovers

Youth career
- Millwall

Senior career*
Years	Team	Apps	(Gls)
1998–2001	Millwall	8	(0)
2001–2002	Hendon	20	(4)
2002–2003	Slough Town	35	(9)
2003–2004	Boreham Wood	7	(1)
2004	Aylesbury United	13	(0)
2004	Hemel Hempstead Town	18	(0)
2004	Windsor & Eton	9	(0)
2004	Dover Athletic	2	(4)
2005	East Thurrock United	7	(2)
2005	Cheshunt	5	(1)
2005	Redbridge	3	(0)
2005–2006	Hendon	5	(0)
2006	AFC Wimbledon	8	(0)
2006–2007	Bromley	2	(0)
2007	→ Leyton (loan)	7	(1)
2007	Harrow Borough	3	(0)
2007–2008	Burnham	21	(11)
2008	Farnborough	18	(3)
2008	Staines Town	12	(0)
2008–2009	Slough Town	31	(1)
2010	Burnham	1	(2)
2010	Hillingdon Borough	?	
2010–2011	Singh Sabha Slough	?	(0)
2011	Hendon	3	(0)
2011–2012	Bedfont Town	8	(0)
2012	Northwood	1	(0)
2014	Dunstable Town	2	(0)
2016	Chalfont St Peter		
2016–2017	Barton Rovers		

International career
2004–2010	Grenada	14	(4)
- * Club domestic league appearances and goals as of March 2014

Byron Bubb (born 17 December 1981) is a retired professional footballer, who played for Southern Football League side Barton Rovers.

He usually plays as a winger but can also operate in "the hole" if needed.

Born in England, he represented Grenada at international level.

== Early life ==
Byron James Bubb was born on 17 December 1981, to parents from Grenada. He attended Bishop Douglass Catholic School and left with two GCSEs, to play professional football.

== Club career ==
Bubb began his career with Millwall making 20 first-team appearances before subsequently playing for Hendon, Slough Town, Boreham Wood, Aylesbury United, Hemel Hempstead Town, Cheshunt, Dover Athletic, AFC Wimbledon, Bromley, Harrow Borough, Burnham, Hillingdon Borough, Farnborough, Bedfont Town, Northwood and Dunstable Town.

Bubb spent the pre-season leading up to the 2011–12 season on trial with Northwood and scored against a Brentford XI on 30 July 2011. However, Bubb did not remain with Northwood and searched for a team elsewhere. He joined Hendon but was released in November 2011, eventually signing with Northwood's league counterparts Bedfont Town. In April 2012, Bubb joined Northwood on dual registration for the final weeks of the season. His first appearance was as a substitute in Northwood's 3–2 win over Uxbridge in the semi-final of the Middlesex Senior Charity Cup on 3 April. His only league appearance came on 14 April 2012, in a win away to Beaconsfield, when he came on for the final 15 minutes. However, upon the conclusion of the season, it remains unclear whether Bubb will re-sign for the team. He rejoined Singh Sabha Slough before having a short two-game spell at Dunstable Town in 2014. He joined Chalfont St Peter in August 2016 and Barton Rovers in November 2016, before retiring in 2017.

== International career ==
Bubb is a part of the Grenada national team having gained 10 caps and scored four international goals.

== Personal life ==
He is the cousin of fellow player Alvin Bubb. His brother, Bradley, is also a footballer.

Bubb is married and has 2 children.
