= 2016–17 EFL Trophy =

Checkatrade Trophy

Tournament details
- Country: England; Wales
- Teams: 64

Final positions
- Champions: Coventry City
- Runners-up: Oxford United

Tournament statistics
- Top goal scorer: (Sierra Leone) Amadou Bakayoko Walsall (6 Goals)

The 2016–17 EFL Trophy, known as the Checkatrade Trophy for sponsorship reasons, was the 36th season in the history of the competition and the first since being rebranded from Football League Trophy. It was played as a knock-out tournament for English football clubs in League One and League Two of the English football system and for the first time was expanded to include 16 Premier League and Championship "B Teams" with Category One status as part of a trial.

In all, 64 clubs entered the competition. Barnsley were the reigning champions, but were ineligible to defend their title following promotion to the Championship.

== Change in format ==
On 9 June 2016, the newly rebranded EFL announced that the 2016–17 EFL Trophy competition would include sixteen "category 1 Premier League academy sides" for the first time. The first knockout round would also be replaced with a new group stage, the sixteen regional groups each to comprise three League One/Two teams plus an academy side, with the top two teams from each group progressing to the knockout second round.

Following the EFL's announcement of these format changes, many of the invited clubs declined to allow their academies to participate, and their places had to filled by the academy sides of several Championship clubs.

Reception to the new format by League One and Two fans was overwhelmingly negative. The opening rounds of fixtures were marked by record low attendances, and the format changes were described as "a complete and utter failure".

== Participating clubs ==
- 48 clubs from League One and League Two.
- 16 invited Category One Academy teams.
- Category One teams relegated to League One missed out on having academies participating in the following tournament.

	League One	League Two	Academies
Clubs	AFC Wimbledon; Bolton Wanderers; Bradford City; Bristol Rovers; Bury; Charlton Athletic; Chesterfield; Coventry City; Fleetwood Town; Gillingham; Millwall; Milton Keynes Dons; Northampton Town; Oldham Athletic; Oxford United; Peterborough United; Port Vale; Rochdale; Scunthorpe United; Sheffield United; Shrewsbury Town; Southend United; Swindon Town; Walsall	Accrington Stanley; Barnet; Blackpool; Cambridge United; Carlisle United; Cheltenham Town; Colchester United; Crawley Town; Crewe Alexandra; Doncaster Rovers; Exeter City; Grimsby Town; Hartlepool United; Leyton Orient; Luton Town; Mansfield Town; Morecambe; Newport County; Notts County; Plymouth Argyle; Portsmouth; Stevenage; Wycombe Wanderers; Yeovil Town	Blackburn Rovers; Brighton & Hove Albion; Chelsea; Derby County; Everton; Leicester City; Middlesbrough; Norwich City; Reading; Southampton; Stoke City; Sunderland; Swansea City; West Bromwich Albion; West Ham United; Wolverhampton Wanderers
Total	24	24	16

Notes

Arsenal, Liverpool, Manchester United, Manchester City, Newcastle United and Tottenham Hotspur declined to participate.

== Eligibility criteria for players ==
- For EFL clubs; a minimum of 5 'First Team' players in the starting 11 as defined under the competition's existing rules.
- For invited clubs – 6 of the starting 11 to be U21 (as at 30 June 2016).

== Dates ==
The competition dates were announced in July 2016.

Round	Dates	Number of teams
Round 1 (Group stage)	29 August – 4 September 2016	64
Round 1 (Group stage)	3–9 October 2016	64
Round 1 (Group stage)	7–13 November 2016	64
Round 2	5–11 December 2016	32
Round 3	9–15 January 2017	16
Quarter-finals	23–29 January 2017	8
Semi-finals	6–26 February 2017	4
Final	2 April 2017 (Wembley Stadium)	2

== Group stage ==
- Sixteen groups of four teams were organised on a regionalised basis.
- All groups included one invited club and at least one club from each of Leagues One and Two.
- All clubs played each other once, either home or away (Academies played all group matches away from home).
- Invited clubs played one home game at the club's first team stadium.
- Clubs were awarded 3 points for a win and 1 point for a draw.
- In the event of a drawn game (after 90 minutes), a penalty shoot-out was held with the winning team earning an additional point.
- The top two teams progressed to the knockout stage.

=== Northern Section ===
==== Group A ====
Pos	Div	Team	Pld	W	PW	PL	L	GF	GA	GD	Pts	Qualification
1	L2	Cheltenham Town	3	2	0	0	1	4	3	+1	6	Advance to Round 2
2	L2	Blackpool	3	1	1	0	1	3	3	0	5	Advance to Round 2
3	ACA	Everton U21	3	1	0	1	1	4	3	+1	4	
4	L1	Bolton Wanderers	3	1	0	0	2	1	3	−2	3	

Source: Sky Sports

30 August 2016	Blackpool	2–1	Cheltenham Town	Blackpool
19:45 BST	Vassell 56', 58'	Report	Jennings 20'	Stadium: Bloomfield Road; Attendance: 760; Referee: Ben Toner

30 August 2016	Bolton Wanderers	0–2	Everton U21	Bolton
19:00 BST		Report	Dyson 22'; McAleny 79'	Stadium: Macron Stadium; Attendance: 1,540; Referee: David Webb

4 October 2016	Cheltenham Town	2–1	Everton U21	Cheltenham
	Waters 82'; Wright 83' (pen.)	Report	Kitscha 5' (o.g.)	Stadium: Whaddon Road; Attendance: 1,023; Referee: Lee Probert

4 October 2016	Bolton Wanderers	1–0	Blackpool	Bolton
19:00 BST	Ameobi 4'	Report		Stadium: Macron Stadium; Attendance: 1,589; Referee: Kevin Friend

8 November 2016	Cheltenham Town	1–0	Bolton Wanderers	Cheltenham
19:45	Morgan-Smith 90+1' (pen.)	report		Stadium: Whaddon Road; Attendance: 1,038; Referee: Kevin Friend

8 November 2016	Everton U21	1–1 (4–5 p)	Blackpool	Liverpool
19:30 GMT	Charsley 79'	report	Gnanduillet 48'	Stadium: Goodison Park; Attendance: 527; Referee: Chris Kavanagh
	Penalties
	Gibson (penalty scored); Charsley (penalty scored); Jones (penalty scored); Henen (penalty scored); Yarney (penalty missed)		(penalty scored) Philliskirk; (penalty scored) Cain; (penalty scored) Wilson; (penalty scored) Cullen; (penalty scored) Gnanduillet

==== Group B ====
Pos	Div	Team	Pld	W	PW	PL	L	GF	GA	GD	Pts	Qualification
1	ACA	Wolverhampton Wanderers U21	3	2	0	0	1	8	4	+4	6	Advance to Round 2
2	L1	Chesterfield	3	2	0	0	1	5	5	0	6	Advance to Round 2
3	L2	Crewe Alexandra	3	1	0	0	2	5	5	0	3	
4	L2	Accrington Stanley	3	1	0	0	2	4	8	−4	3	

Source: Sky Sports

30 August 2016	Chesterfield	2–1	Wolverhampton Wanderers U21	Chesterfield
19:45	Ebanks-Blake 24'; Dennis 76'	Report	Ebanks-Landell (red card) 29'; Herc 74'	Stadium: Proact Stadium; Attendance: 950; Referee: Seb Stockbridge

30 August 2016	Accrington Stanley	0–3	Crewe Alexandra	Accrington
19:45		Report	Ainley 47'; Cooper 76'; Udoh 90'	Stadium: Crown Ground; Attendance: 585; Referee: Darren Handley

4 October 2016	Crewe Alexandra	2–3	Wolverhampton Wanderers U21	Crewe
19:45 BST	Dagnall 69'; Lowe 82'	Report	Dicko 7', 45+1'; Enobakhare 88'	Stadium: Gresty Road; Attendance: 963; Referee: David Webb

4 October 2016	Chesterfield	1–4	Accrington Stanley	Chesterfield
19:45 BST	Dennis 61'	Report	Taylor-Fletcher 14'; Gornell 21', 66'; Clark 42'	Stadium: Proact Stadium; Attendance: 976; Referee: David Coote

8 November 2016	Crewe Alexandra	0–2	Chesterfield	Crewe
19:45		report	O'Shea 22'; Dimaio 81' (pen.)	Stadium: Gresty Road; Attendance: 929; Referee: Roger East

8 November 2016	Wolverhampton Wanderers U21	4–0	Accrington Stanley	Wolverhampton
19:45	Herc 18'; Wilson 37'; Ronan 45+3' (pen.); Enobakhare 67'	report		Stadium: Molineux Stadium; Attendance: 547; Referee: David Webb

==== Group C ====
Pos	Div	Team	Pld	W	PW	PL	L	GF	GA	GD	Pts	Qualification
1	L1	Bradford City	3	2	0	0	1	5	4	+1	6	Advance to Round 2
2	L2	Morecambe	3	2	0	0	1	7	7	0	6	Advance to Round 2
3	L1	Bury	3	1	0	1	1	6	4	+2	4	
4	ACA	Stoke City U21	3	0	1	0	2	2	5	−3	2	

Source: Sky Sports

30 August 2016	Bradford City	1–0	Stoke City U21	Bradford
19:45	Dieng 38'	Report	Banks (yellow card) 62' (yellow-red card) 74'	Stadium: Valley Parade; Attendance: 1,444; Referee: Michael Salisbury

30 August 2016	Bury	4–1	Morecambe	Bury
19:45	Zeli Ismail 3' (pen.); Pope 49', 90+2'; Kay 81'	Report	Mullin 43'	Stadium: Gigg Lane; Attendance: 1,154; Referee: Robert Jones

4 October 2016	Morecambe	3–1	Stoke City U21	Morecambe
19:45	Dunn 3'; Stockton 21'; Murphy 44'	Report	Adam 48'	Stadium: Globe Arena; Attendance: 686; Referee: Andy Haines

4 October 2016	Bradford City	2–1	Bury	Bradford
19:45	Vučkić 31'; Hiwula 35'	Report	Walker 69'	Stadium: Valley Parade; Attendance: 1,865; Referee: Ben Toner

8 November 2016	Stoke City U21	1–1 (4–3 p)	Bury	Stoke-on-Trent
19:45	Bojan 86'	report	Miller 68'	Stadium: Bet365 Stadium; Attendance: 698; Referee: Ben Toner
	Penalties
	Banks (penalty missed); Edwards (penalty scored); Campbell (penalty scored); Ngoy (penalty scored); Taylor (penalty scored)		(penalty missed) Tutte; (penalty missed) Danns; (penalty scored) Dudley; (penalty scored) Kay; (penalty scored) Soares

9 November 2016	Morecambe	3–2	Bradford City	Morecambe
19:45	Mullin 43'; Stockton 66', 68'	report	Vučkić 52', 87'	Stadium: Globe Arena; Attendance: 827; Referee: Tony Harrington

==== Group D ====
Pos	Div	Team	Pld	W	PW	PL	L	GF	GA	GD	Pts	Qualification
1	L2	Carlisle United	3	3	0	0	0	11	6	+5	9	Advance to Round 2
2	L1	Oldham Athletic	3	1	1	0	1	8	7	+1	5	Advance to Round 2
3	L1	Fleetwood Town	3	1	0	0	2	3	6	−3	3	
4	ACA	Blackburn Rovers U21	3	0	0	1	2	2	5	−3	1	

Source: Sky Sports

30 August 2016	Fleetwood Town	1–0	Blackburn Rovers U21	Fleetwood
19:45	Cole 45'	Report		Stadium: Highbury Stadium; Attendance: 392; Referee: Ross Joyce

30 August 2016	Oldham Athletic	4–5	Carlisle United	Oldham
19:45	McKay 16'; Osei 48', 49'; Banks 66'	Report	Raynes 18', 89'; Lambe 22'; Burgess 28' (o.g.); Miller 74'; Gillesphey (red card) 82'	Stadium: Boundary Park; Attendance: 1,897; Referee: Peter Bankes

4 October 2016	Carlisle United	2–0	Blackburn Rovers U21	Carlisle
19:45	Miller 39'; Grainger 88' (pen.)	Report		Stadium: Brunton Park; Attendance: 1,253; Referee: Richard Clark

4 October 2016	Fleetwood Town	0–2	Oldham Athletic	Fleetwood
19:45		Report	Mckay 32'; Erwin 38'	Stadium: Highbury Stadium; Attendance: 793; Referee: Darren Bond

8 November 2016	Blackburn Rovers U21	2–2 (4–5 p)	Oldham Athletic	Blackburn
19:30	Stokes 22'; Feeney 61'	report	Ladapo 49'; Wilson 67'	Stadium: Ewood Park; Attendance: 471; Referee: Robert Jones
	Penalties
	Stokes (penalty scored); Bennett (penalty scored); Tomlinson (penalty missed); Hardcastle (penalty scored); Mahoney (penalty scored); Feeney (penalty missed)		(penalty scored) Banks; (penalty missed) Law; (penalty scored) Ripley; (penalty scored) McKay; (penalty scored) McLaughlin; (penalty scored) Croft

9 November 2016	Carlisle United	4–2	Fleetwood Town	Carlisle
19:45	Mckee 14'; Wyke 18'; Grainger 41' (pen.); Salkeld 73'	report	Sowerby 48'; Jakubiak 64'	Stadium: Brunton Park; Attendance: 1,420; Referee: Chris Sarginson

==== Group E ====
Pos	Div	Team	Pld	W	PW	PL	L	GF	GA	GD	Pts	Qualification
1	L2	Doncaster Rovers	3	1	1	1	0	4	2	+2	6	Advance to Round 2
2	L2	Mansfield Town	3	2	0	0	1	4	4	0	6	Advance to Round 2
3	L1	Port Vale	3	1	1	0	1	1	1	0	5	
4	ACA	Derby County U21	3	0	0	1	2	4	6	−2	1	

Source: Sky Sports

30 August 2016	Port Vale	1–0	Derby County U21	Burslem
19:45	Smith 80'	Report		Stadium: Vale Park; Attendance: 1,198; Referee: Mark Heywood

30 August 2016	Mansfield Town	0–2	Doncaster Rovers	Mansfield
19:45 BST		Report	Beestin 72'; Calder 86'	Stadium: Field Mill; Attendance: 1,467; Referee: Neil Swarbrick

4 October 2016	Doncaster Rovers	2–2 (4–2 p)	Derby County U21	Doncaster
19:45	Mandeville 53'; Longbottom 82'	Report	Wilson 9'; Wiemann 90'	Stadium: Keepmoat Stadium; Attendance: 1,515; Referee: Carl Boyeson
	Penalties
	Middleton (penalty scored); Longbottom (penalty scored); Keegan (penalty scored); Marquis (penalty missed); Beestin (penalty scored)		(penalty scored) Blackman; (penalty scored) Guy; (penalty missed) Alefe Santos; (penalty missed) Bennett

4 October 2016	Port Vale	0–1	Mansfield Town	Burslem
19:45		Report	Green 66'	Stadium: Vale Park; Attendance: 1,025; Referee: Michael Salisbury

8 November 2016	Doncaster Rovers	0–0 (3–4 p)	Port Vale	Doncaster
19:45		report		Stadium: Keepmoat Stadium; Attendance: 1,495; Referee: Geoff Eltringham
	Penalties
	Houghton (penalty scored); Evina (penalty missed); Longbottom (penalty missed); Mandeville (penalty scored); Keegan (penalty scored)		(penalty scored) Streete; (penalty missed) Grant; (penalty scored) Leite Pereira; (penalty scored) Paulo Tavares; (penalty scored) Hart

8 November 2016	Derby County U21	2–3	Mansfield Town	Derby
19:45	Hanson 24'; Weimann 84'	Report	Hemmings 2'; Henderson 5'; Clements 90+3'	Stadium: Pride Park Stadium; Attendance: 870; Referee: Trevor Kettle

==== Group F ====
Pos	Div	Team	Pld	W	PW	PL	L	GF	GA	GD	Pts	Qualification
1	L1	Rochdale	3	2	1	0	0	5	3	+2	8	Advance to Round 2
2	ACA	Sunderland U21	3	2	0	1	0	4	2	+2	7	Advance to Round 2
3	L2	Notts County	3	1	0	0	2	4	5	−1	3	
4	L2	Hartlepool United	3	0	0	0	3	2	5	−3	0	

Source: Sky Sports

31 August 2016	Notts County	2–1	Hartlepool United	Nottingham
19:45	Snijders 20'; Oates 36'	Report	Burke 29'	Stadium: Meadow Lane; Attendance: 1,095; Referee: Darren England

6 September 2016	Rochdale	1–1 (4–2 p)	Sunderland U21	Rochdale
	Henderson 57'	Report	Embleton 51'	Stadium: Spotland Stadium; Attendance: 1,184; Referee: Graham Salisbury
	Penalties
	Davies (penalty scored); Rafferty (penalty scored); Bunney (penalty scored); McGahey (penalty missed); Odelusi (penalty scored)		Honeyman (penalty missed); Kirhcoff (penalty scored); Robson (penalty missed); Greenwood (penalty scored)

4 October 2016	Hartlepool United	0–1	Sunderland U21	Hartlepool
19:45		Report	Love 66'	Stadium: Victoria Park; Attendance: 1,295; Referee: John Brooks

4 October 2016	Rochdale	2–1	Notts County	Rochdale
19:45	Odelusi 61'; Davies 69'	Report	Forte 25'	Stadium: Spotland Stadium; Attendance: 1,147; Referee: Jeremy Simpson

9 November 2016	Hartlepool United	1–2	Rochdale	Hartlepool
19:30	Oates 85'	report	Noble-Lazarus 21'; Gillam 67'	Stadium: Victoria Park; Attendance: 380; Referee: Scott Duncan

9 November 2016	Sunderland U21	2–1	Notts County	Sunderland
19:30	Maja 84'; Hollis 90' (o.g.)	report	Campbell 49'	Stadium: Stadium of Light; Attendance: 633; Referee: Ross Joyce

==== Group G ====
Pos	Div	Team	Pld	W	PW	PL	L	GF	GA	GD	Pts	Qualification
1	L1	Scunthorpe United	3	3	0	0	0	6	1	+5	9	Advance to Round 2
2	L2	Cambridge United	3	2	0	0	1	3	3	0	6	Advance to Round 2
3	L1	Shrewsbury Town	3	1	0	0	2	3	3	0	3	
4	ACA	Middlesbrough U21	3	0	0	0	3	2	7	−5	0	

Source: Sky Sports

30 August 2016	Scunthorpe United	2–1	Middlesbrough U21	Scunthorpe
19:45 BST	Wallace 63'; Adelakun 73'	Report	Cooke 72'	Stadium: Glanford Park; Attendance: 1,200; Referee: Andrew Madley

30 August 2016	Shrewsbury Town	0–1	Cambridge United	Shrewsbury
19:45 BST		Report	Pigott 20'	Stadium: New Meadow; Attendance: 1,187; Referee: Chris Sarginson

4 October 2016	Cambridge United	2–1	Middlesbrough U21	Cambridge
19:00 BST	Ikpeazu 12'; Eldson 55' (o.g.)	Report	Tavernier 34'	Stadium: Abbey Stadium; Attendance: 693; Referee: John Busby

4 October 2016	Scunthorpe United	2–0	Shrewsbury Town	Scunthorpe
19:45 BST	Lancashire 10' (o.g.); Margetts 56'	Report		Stadium: Glanford Park; Attendance: 1,316; Referee: Nigel Miller

8 November 2016	Cambridge United	0–2	Scunthorpe United	Cambridge
19:45 GMT		report	Williams 36'; Adelakun 90+1'	Stadium: Abbey Stadium; Attendance: 666; Referee: Darren Deadman

8 November 2016	Middlesbrough U21	0–3	Shrewsbury Town	Middlesbrough
19:45 GMT		report	Leitch-Smith 10', 59'; Toney 14'	Stadium: Riverside Stadium; Attendance: 308; Referee: Darren Handley

==== Group H ====
Pos	Div	Team	Pld	W	PW	PL	L	GF	GA	GD	Pts	Qualification
1	L1	Walsall	3	3	0	0	0	8	3	+5	9	Advance to Round 2
2	ACA	Leicester City U21	3	1	1	0	1	1	1	0	5	Advance to Round 2
3	L1	Sheffield United	3	1	0	1	1	5	4	+1	4	
4	L2	Grimsby Town	3	0	0	0	3	4	10	−6	0	

Source: Sky Sports

30 August 2016	Sheffield United	0–0 (4–5 p)	Leicester City U21	Sheffield
19:45		Report		Stadium: Bramall Lane; Attendance: 3,632; Referee: Nigel Miller
	Penalties
	Coutts (penalty scored); Fleck (penalty missed); Duffy (penalty scored); Chapman (penalty scored); O'Connell (penalty scored)		Chilwell (penalty scored); Gray (penalty scored); Muskwe (penalty scored); Barnes (penalty scored); Ndukwu (penalty scored)

30 August 2016	Walsall	5–2	Grimsby Town	Walsall
19:45	Bakayoko 19', 39', 43'; Morris 61'; Kouhyar 71'	Report	Boyce 5'; Summerfield 67'	Stadium: Bescot Stadium; Attendance: 1,022; Referee: Andy Woolmer

4 October 2016	Grimsby Town	0–1	Leicester City U21	Cleethorpes
19:45		Report	Mitchell 64'	Stadium: Blundell Park; Attendance: 609; Referee: Mark Haywood

4 October 2016	Sheffield United	1–2	Walsall	Sheffield
19:45	Coutts 78'	Report	Laird 16'; Bakayoko 66'	Stadium: Bramall Lane; Attendance: 2,619; Referee: Mark Heywood

9 November 2016	Grimsby Town	2–4	Sheffield United	Cleethorpes
19:45	Jackson 14'; Disley 81'	report	Slater 53'; Boyce 74' (o.g.); O'Connell 78'; Clarke 87'	Stadium: Blundell Park; Attendance: 597; Referee: Richard Clark

8 November 2016	Leicester City U21	0–1	Walsall	Leicester
19:45		report	Bakayoko 58'	Stadium: King Power Stadium; Attendance: 839; Referee: Mark Haywood

=== Southern Section ===
==== Group A ====
Pos	Div	Team	Pld	W	PW	PL	L	GF	GA	GD	Pts	Qualification
1	L2	Yeovil Town	3	2	0	1	0	6	3	+3	7	Advance to Round 2
2	ACA	Reading U21	3	1	1	0	1	5	6	−1	5	Advance to Round 2
3	L2	Portsmouth	3	1	0	1	1	6	6	0	4	
4	L1	Bristol Rovers	3	0	1	0	2	2	4	−2	2	

Source: Sky Sports

30 August 2016	Bristol Rovers	2–3	Reading U21	Bristol
19:45 BST	Taylor 60'; Easter 81'	Report	Stacey 33'; Sheppard 76'; Mendes 84' (pen.)	Stadium: Memorial Stadium; Attendance: 1,418; Referee: Brett Huxtable

30 August 2016	Yeovil Town	4–3	Portsmouth	Yeovil
19:45 BST	Mugabi 14'; Eaves 22', 39'; McLeod 27'	Report	Smith 10', 37', 54'	Stadium: Huish Park; Attendance: 1,534; Referee: Kevin Johnson

4 October 2016	Portsmouth	2–2 (3–4 p)	Reading U21	Portsmouth
19:45 BST	Main 57', 63'	Report	Novakovich 6'; Mendes 52' (pen.)	Stadium: Fratton Park; Attendance: 1,355; Referee: Oliver Langford
	Penalties
	Smith (penalty scored); Naismith (penalty scored); Bennett (penalty missed); Lalkovič (penalty missed); Evans (penalty scored); May (penalty missed); Whatmough (penalty missed)		(penalty scored) Mendes; (penalty scored) Blackett; (penalty scored) Gravenberch; (penalty missed) Samuel; (penalty missed) Griffin; (penalty missed) Watson; (penalty scored) Frost

4 October 2016	Bristol Rovers	0–0 (5–3 p)	Yeovil Town	Bristol
19:45 BST		Report		Stadium: Memorial Stadium; Attendance: 2,117; Referee: James Adcock
	Penalties
	James (penalty scored); Bodin (penalty scored); Taylor (penalty scored); Colkett (penalty scored); Montaño (penalty scored)		(penalty scored) Dickson; (penalty missed) Hedges; (penalty scored) Mcleod; (penalty scored) Lawless

8 November 2016	Portsmouth	1–0	Bristol Rovers	Portsmouth
19:45 GMT	Naismith 88'	Report		Stadium: Fratton Park; Attendance: 1,200; Referee: James Adcock

9 November 2016	Reading U21	0–2	Yeovil Town	Reading
19:30 GMT		Report	Eaves 48'; Zoko 89'	Stadium: Madejski Stadium; Attendance: 739; Referee: John Busby

==== Group B ====
Pos	Div	Team	Pld	W	PW	PL	L	GF	GA	GD	Pts	Qualification
1	L1	AFC Wimbledon	3	2	0	0	1	5	3	+2	6	Advance to Round 2
2	ACA	Swansea City U21	3	2	0	0	1	4	4	0	6	Advance to Round 2
3	L2	Plymouth Argyle	3	1	0	0	2	5	5	0	3	
4	L2	Newport County	3	1	0	0	2	4	6	−2	3	

Source: Sky Sports

30 August 2016	AFC Wimbledon	3–0	Swansea City U21	Kingston upon Thames
19:45 BST	Barcham 38'; Poleon 57' 67'	Report		Stadium: Kingsmeadow; Attendance: 461; Referee: Simon Hooper

30 August 2016	Plymouth Argyle	4–1	Newport County	Plymouth
	Slew 51'; Jervis 58'; Bulvītis 69'; Tanner 90+3'	Report	Green 19'	Stadium: Home Park; Attendance: 2,349; Referee: Andy Davies

4 October 2016	AFC Wimbledon	2–1	Plymouth Argyle	Kingston upon Thames
19:45	Taylor 65'; Barnett 68'	Report	Smith 7'	Stadium: Kingsmeadow; Attendance: 936; Referee: Graham Horwood

4 October 2016	Newport County	1–2	Swansea City U21	Newport
19:45	Myrie-Williams 90+3'	Report	Biabi 35'; Samuel 88'	Stadium: Rodney Parade; Attendance: 807; Referee: Brett Huxtable

8 November 2016	Newport County	2–0	AFC Wimbledon	Newport
19:45	Benett 7'; Barnum-Bobb (85))	report		Stadium: Rodney Parade; Attendance: 368; Referee: Andy Davies

8 November 2016	Swansea City U21	2–0	Plymouth Argyle	Swansea
19:45	James 13'; McBurnie 20'	report		Stadium: Liberty Stadium; Attendance: 641; Referee: Brendan Malone

==== Group C ====
Pos	Div	Team	Pld	W	PW	PL	L	GF	GA	GD	Pts	Qualification
1	L1	Swindon Town	3	1	2	0	0	3	2	+1	7	Advance to Round 2
2	L1	Oxford United	3	1	0	2	0	5	3	+2	5	Advance to Round 2
3	L2	Exeter City	3	1	0	1	1	6	7	−1	4	
4	ACA	Chelsea U21	3	0	1	0	2	4	6	−2	2	

Source: Sky Sports

30 August 2016	Oxford United	4–2	Exeter City	Oxford
19:45 BST	Roberts 12'; Maguire 36' (pen.); Taylor 68'; MacDonald 71'	Report	Jay 43'; McAlinden 61'	Stadium: Kassam Stadium; Attendance: 1,575; Referee: James Adcock

13 September 2016	Swindon Town	2–1	Chelsea U21	Swindon
19:45 BST	Branco 18'; Delfouneso 60'	Report	Ali 80'	Stadium: County Ground; Attendance: 1,961; Referee: Graham Horwood

4 October 2016	Swindon Town	0–0 (3–1 p)	Oxford United	Swindon
19:45		Report		Stadium: County Ground; Attendance: 2,698; Referee: Paul Tierney
	Penalties
	Goddard (penalty scored); Murray (penalty missed); Norris (penalty missed); Thomas (penalty scored); Furlong (penalty scored)		(penalty missed) Sercombe; (penalty scored) Taylor; (penalty missed) Thomas; (penalty missed) Ruffles

18 October 2016	Exeter City	3–2	Chelsea U21	Exeter
19:45 BST	Watkins 2'; Wheeler 25'; McAlinden 49'	Report	Ugbo 70', 90+4'	Stadium: St James Park; Attendance: 1,979; Referee: Chris Sarginson

8 November 2016	Chelsea U21	1–1 (13–12 p)	Oxford United	Fulham, London
	Quintero 44'	report	Hemmings 90+4'	Stadium: Stamford Bridge; Attendance: 5,200; Referee: Dean Whitestone
	Penalties
	Ugbo (penalty scored); Aina (penalty scored); Dabo (penalty scored); Van Ginkel (penalty missed); Zouma (penalty scored); Collins (penalty missed); Ali (penalty scored); Maddox (penalty scored); Quintero (penalty scored); Grant (penalty missed); Colley (penalty scored); Ugbo (penalty scored); Aina (penalty missed); Dabo (penalty scored); Van Ginkel (penalty scored); Zouma (penalty scored); Collins (penalty scored)		Maguire (penalty scored); Lundstram (penalty missed); Hemmings (penalty scored); Johnson (penalty scored); Rothwell (penalty scored); Thomas (penalty missed); Skarz (penalty scored); Edwards (penalty scored); Nelson (penalty scored); Martin (penalty missed); Eastwood (penalty scored); Maguire (penalty scored); Lundstram (penalty missed); Hemmings (penalty scored); Johnson (penalty scored); Rothwell (penalty scored); Thomas (penalty missed)

8 November 2016	Exeter City	1–1 (2–4 p)	Swindon Town	Exeter
19:45	Wheeler 59'	report	Norris 30'	Stadium: St James Park; Attendance: 729; Referee: Brett Huxtable
	Penalties
	James (penalty missed); Simpson (penalty scored); Grant (penalty scored); Holmes (penalty missed)		(penalty scored) Doughty; (penalty scored) Evans; (penalty scored) Raphael Branco; (penalty scored) Yaser Kasim

==== Group D ====
Pos	Div	Team	Pld	W	PW	PL	L	GF	GA	GD	Pts	Qualification
1	L1	Coventry City	3	3	0	0	0	11	5	+6	9	Advance to Round 2
2	L2	Wycombe Wanderers	3	2	0	0	1	8	4	+4	6	Advance to Round 2
3	ACA	West Ham United U21	3	0	1	0	2	3	8	−5	2	
4	L1	Northampton Town	3	0	0	1	2	2	7	−5	1	

Source: Sky Sports

30 August 2016	Coventry City	4–2	West Ham United U21	Coventry
19:45	Turnbull 35', 75'; Lameiras 48'; Willis 73'	Report	Martínez 33', 90+1'	Stadium: Ricoh Arena; Attendance: 2,091; Referee: Keith Stroud

30 August 2016	Northampton Town	0–3	Wycombe Wanderers	Northampton
		Report	Rowe 17'; Hayes 47'; Thompson 90+4'	Stadium: Sixfields Stadium; Attendance: 1,408; Referee: Paul Tierney

4 October 2016	Coventry City	3–1	Northampton Town	Coventry
19:45	Agyei 1'; Jones 8'; Lameiras 66'	Report	Richards 2'	Stadium: Ricoh Arena; Attendance: 2,085; Referee: Ollie Yates

4 October 2016	Wycombe Wanderers	3–0	West Ham United U21	High Wycombe
19:45	Akinfenwa 7'; Kashket 47'; Freeman 68'	Report		Stadium: Adams Park; Attendance: 1,060; Referee: Darren Deadman

8 November 2016	Northampton Town	1–1 (2–3 p)	West Ham United U21	Northampton (Note: Originally scheduled to be played at the Olympic Stadium, this game was switched as a result of West Ham's tenancy terms)
19:45	Beautyman 23'	report	Parfitt-Williams 39'	Stadium: Sixfields Stadium; Attendance: 762; Referee: Graham Salisbury
	Penalties
	Beautyman (penalty missed); Potter (penalty scored); Byrom (penalty scored); Sonupe (penalty missed); O'Toole (penalty missed)		Browne (penalty missed); Pike (penalty scored); Lewis (penalty scored); Kemp (penalty scored)

9 November 2016	Wycombe Wanderers	2–4	Coventry City	High Wycombe
19:45	McGinn 32'; Kashket 53'	report	Haynes 57'; Haynes 60'; Thomas 63'; Bigirimana 86'	Stadium: Adams Park; Attendance: 912; Referee: Charles Breakspear

==== Group E ====
Pos	Div	Team	Pld	W	PW	PL	L	GF	GA	GD	Pts	Qualification
1	ACA	Southampton U21	3	2	0	1	0	6	1	+5	7	Advance to Round 2
2	L2	Crawley Town	3	2	0	0	1	3	4	−1	6	Advance to Round 2
3	L1	Charlton Athletic	3	0	1	1	1	1	3	−2	3	
4	L2	Colchester United	3	0	1	0	2	2	4	−2	2	

Source: Sky Sports

30 August 2016	Charlton Athletic	0–0 (5–4 p)	Southampton U21	London
19:45 BST		Report		Stadium: The Valley; Attendance: 1,326; Referee: Andy Haines
	Penalties
	Solly (penalty scored); Umerah (penalty scored); Foley (penalty missed); Hanlan (penalty scored); Ahearne-Grant (penalty scored); Konsa (penalty scored)		Stephens (penalty missed); Hesketh (penalty scored); McQueen (penalty scored); Jones (penalty scored); O'Connor (penalty scored); McCarthy (penalty missed)

30 August 2016	Crawley Town	1–0	Colchester United	Crawley
19:45 BST	Collins 33'	Report		Stadium: Broadfield Stadium; Attendance: 881; Referee: Tim Robinson

4 October 2016	Colchester United	1–2	Southampton U21	Colchester
19:45 BST	Sembie-Ferris 23'	Report	McQueen 8'; Olomola 51'	Stadium: Colchester Community Stadium; Attendance: 791; Referee: Stephen Martin

4 October 2016	Charlton Athletic	0–2	Crawley Town	London
19:45 BST		Report	Yussuf 44'; Collins 50'	Stadium: The Valley; Attendance: 1,186; Referee: James Linington

8 November 2016	Colchester United	1–1 (4–3 p)	Charlton Athletic	Colchester
19:45	Bonne 42'	report	Ajose 32'	Stadium: Colchester Community Stadium; Attendance: 548; Referee: John Brooks
	Penalties
	Guthrie (penalty scored); Bonne (penalty scored); Dunne (penalty missed); Wright (penalty scored); Slater (penalty scored)		Hanlan (penalty scored); Ulvestad (penalty scored); Ahearne-Grant (penalty missed); Jorge Teixeira (penalty scored); Konsa (penalty missed)

9 November 2016	Southampton U21	4–0	Crawley Town	Southampton
19:45	Mersin 3' (o.g.); Mdlalose 9'; Slattery 34'; Olomola 78'	report		Stadium: St Mary's Stadium; Attendance: 495; Referee: Keith Stroud

==== Group F ====
Pos	Div	Team	Pld	W	PW	PL	L	GF	GA	GD	Pts	Qualification
1	ACA	Norwich City U21	3	3	0	0	0	15	2	+13	9	Advance to Round 2
2	L1	Milton Keynes Dons	3	1	1	0	1	4	6	−2	5	Advance to Round 2
3	L1	Peterborough United	3	1	0	0	2	3	8	−5	3	
4	L2	Barnet	3	0	0	1	2	3	9	−6	1	

Source: Sky Sports

30 August 2016	Peterborough United	1–6	Norwich City U21	Peterborough
19:30	Anderson 52'	Report	Murphy 6', 82'; Andreu 8', 45+2', 56'; Maddison 24'	Stadium: London Road Stadium; Attendance: 1,696; Referee: Dean Whitestone

30 August 2016	Milton Keynes Dons	2–2 (5–3 p)	Barnet	Milton Keynes
19:45	Reeves 34'; Walsh 82'	Report	Nicholls 62'; Weston 72'	Stadium: Stadium mk Attendance: 2,114; Referee: John Brooks
	Penalties
	Bowditch (penalty scored); Walsh (penalty scored); Powell (penalty scored); Maynard (penalty scored); Thomas-Asante (penalty scored)		Weston (penalty scored); Nicholls (penalty scored); Nelson (penalty scored); Akpa Akpro (penalty missed)

4 October 2016	Barnet	0–5	Norwich City U21	Canons Park
20:00			Murphy 45+2', 56', 89'; Canós 68'; Oliveira 79'	Stadium: The Hive Stadium; Attendance: 457; Referee: Kevin Johnson

4 October 2016	Peterborough United	0–1	Milton Keynes Dons	Peterborough
19:30		Report	Agard 40'	Stadium: London Road Stadium; Attendance: 1,793; Referee: Trevor Kettle

8 November 2016	Barnet	1–2	Peterborough United	Canons Park
19:45	Amaluzor 68'		Taylor 6'; Moncur 84'	Stadium: The Hive Stadium; Attendance: 393; Referee: Andy Woolmer

8 November 2016	Norwich City U21	4–1	Milton Keynes Dons	Norwich
19:00	Morris 11'; Oliveira 38', 63'; Adams 87'		Tapp 84'	Stadium: Carrow Road; Attendance: 1,042; Referee: Andy Haines

==== Group G ====
Pos	Div	Team	Pld	W	PW	PL	L	GF	GA	GD	Pts	Qualification
1	L1	Southend United	3	2	0	0	1	3	4	−1	6	Advance to Round 2
2	ACA	Brighton & Hove Albion U21	3	1	1	0	1	3	4	−1	5	Advance to Round 2
3	L2	Stevenage	3	1	0	1	1	7	5	+2	4	
4	L2	Leyton Orient	3	1	0	0	2	3	3	0	3	

Source: Sky Sports

30 August 2016	Southend United	2–0	Brighton & Hove Albion U21	Southend-on-Sea
	Moony 35'; Kyprianou 49'	Report		Stadium: Roots Hall; Attendance: 1,275; Referee: Darren Deadman

30 August 2016	Leyton Orient	3–1	Stevenage	Leyton
	McCallum 33', 70'; Semedo 54'	Report	Franks 58'	Stadium: Brisbane Road; Attendance: 876; Referee: Gavin Ward

4 October 2016	Stevenage	2–2 (3–4 p)	Brighton & Hove Albion U21	Stevenage
19:45	Walker 60'; McKirdy 87'	Report	Ince 1'; Starkey 83'	Stadium: Broadhall Way; Attendance: 486; Referee: Nick Kinseley
	Penalties
	Tonge (penalty scored); Cowans (penalty missed); Fox (penalty scored); Hunte (penalty missed); Gorman (penalty scored)		(penalty missed) Hünemeier; (penalty scored) Goldson; (penalty scored) Tilley; (penalty scored) Pocognoli; (penalty scored) Collar

4 October 2016	Southend United	1–0	Leyton Orient	Southend-on-Sea
19:45	Fortuné 82'	Report		Stadium: Roots Hall; Attendance: 2,383; Referee: Andy Woolmer

8 November 2016	Stevenage	4–0	Southend United	Stevenage
19:45	Schumacher 8'; Godden 18'; Liburd 64', 90'			Stadium: Broadhall Way; Attendance: 559; Referee: Graham Horwood

8 November 2016	Brighton & Hove Albion U21	1–0	Leyton Orient	Falmer, Brighton and Hove
	Towell 16'			Stadium: Falmer Stadium; Attendance: 549; Referee: Lee Probert

==== Group H ====
Pos	Div	Team	Pld	W	PW	PL	L	GF	GA	GD	Pts	Qualification
1	L1	Millwall	3	3	0	0	0	7	2	+5	9	Advance to Round 2
2	L2	Luton Town	3	2	0	0	1	5	4	+1	6	Advance to Round 2
3	L1	Gillingham	3	1	0	0	2	4	4	0	3	
4	ACA	West Bromwich Albion U21	3	0	0	0	3	0	6	−6	0	

Source: Sky Sports

30 August 2016	Millwall	2–0	West Bromwich Albion U21	London
19:45	Abdou 63'; Morison 75' (pen.)	Report		Stadium: The Den; Attendance: 2,054; Referee: Brendan Malone

30 August 2016	Gillingham	1–2	Luton Town	Gillingham
19:45	Oldaker 90+1'	Report	Musonda 10'; Smith 22'	Stadium: Priestfield Stadium; Attendance: 2,128; Referee: John Busby

4 October 2016	Luton Town	2–0	West Bromwich Albion U21	Luton
19:30	Gilliead 60'; Gray 62'	Report		Stadium: Kenilworth Road; Attendance: 1,454; Referee: Andy Davies

4 October 2016	Millwall	2–1	Gillingham	London
19:45	Onyedinma 45+4'; Morison 88'	Report	Wright 17'	Stadium: The Den; Attendance: 2,104; Referee: Chris Sarginson

8 November 2016	Luton Town	1–3	Millwall	Luton
19:30	Hutchinson 57' (o.g.)	Report	Onyedinma 71'; Smith 81', 87'	Stadium: Kenilworth Road; Attendance: 2,251; Referee: Oliver Langford

8 November 2016	West Bromwich Albion U21	0–2	Gillingham	West Bromwich
		Report	Oldaker 45'; Emmanuel-Thomas 55'	Stadium: The Hawthorns; Attendance: 274; Referee: Nigel Miller

== Knockout stage ==
If scores were level after 90 minutes in rounds 2, 3 and 4, the game was determined via a penalty shoot-out.

=== Round 2 ===
The second round draw was made on 10 November 2016. The 32 remaining teams were drawn into 16 ties; each group winner was at home to a runner-up from a different group within their own region.

==== Northern Section ====
10 January 2017	Cheltenham Town (4)	6–1	Leicester City U21	Cheltenham
19:45 GMT	De Girolamo 9', 36', 87'; O'Shaughnessy 31'; Pell 65'; Morgan-Smith 79'	Report	Kapustka 10'	Stadium: Whaddon Road; Attendance: 1,028; Referee: Brett Huxtable

5 December 2016	Wolverhampton Wanderers U21	1–1 (4–3 p)	Sunderland U21	Wolverhampton
19:00 GMT	Enobakhare 13'	Report	Beadling 17'	Stadium: Molineux Stadium; Attendance: 1,118; Referee: Mark Heywood
	Penalties
	Ronan (penalty scored); Deslandes (penalty missed); Enobakhare (penalty scored); Gibbs-White (penalty scored); Carnat (penalty scored)		E. Robson (penalty scored); Casey (penalty scored); Maja (penalty scored); Molyneux (penalty missed); Honeyman (penalty missed)

7 December 2016	Bradford City (3)	1–0	Cambridge United (4)	Bradford
19:45 GMT	Law 64'	Report		Stadium: Valley Parade; Attendance: 1,360; Referee: Robert Lewis

6 December 2016	Carlisle United (4)	2–3	Mansfield Town (4)	Carlisle
19:45 GMT	Miller 72'; Wyke 80'	Report	Pearce 15'; Green 30'; Rose 86'	Stadium: Brunton Park; Attendance: 1,126; Referee: David Webb

6 December 2016	Doncaster Rovers (4)	1–1 (7–8 p)	Blackpool (4)	Doncaster
19:00 GMT	Williams 52'	Report	Gnanduillet 24'	Stadium: Keepmoat Stadium; Attendance: 1,549; Referee: David Coote
	Penalties
	Middleton (penalty scored); Beestin (penalty scored); Keegan (penalty scored); Mandeville (penalty scored); Houghton (penalty missed); Calder (penalty scored); Mason (penalty scored); Baudry (penalty scored); Longbottom (penalty missed)		Philliskirk (penalty scored); Cullen (penalty scored); Redshaw (penalty scored); Roache (penalty scored); Yeates (penalty missed); Nolan (penalty scored); Cameron (penalty scored); Aimson (penalty scored); Higham (penalty scored)

6 December 2016	Rochdale (3)	0–2	Chesterfield (3)	Rochdale
19:45 GMT			Maguire 24'; Evans 59'	Stadium: Spotland Stadium; Attendance: 995; Referee: Graham Salisbury

6 December 2016	Scunthorpe United (3)	1–1 (5–3 p)	Morecambe (4)	Scunthorpe
19:45 GMT	Mantom 3'	Report	Edwards 53'	Stadium: Glanford Park; Attendance: 987; Referee: Darren Drysdale
	Penalties
	Morris (penalty scored); Madden (penalty scored) van Veen (penalty scored); Mantom (penalty scored); Williams (penalty scored)		Murphy (penalty missed); Rose (penalty scored); Molyneux (penalty scored); Mullin (penalty scored)

13 December 2016	Walsall (3)	1–3	Oldham Athletic (3)	Bescot, Walsall
19:45 GMT	Bakayoko 44'	Report	Croft 69'; Burgess 73'; Erwin 89'	Stadium: Bescot Stadium; Attendance: 925; Referee: Nigel Miller

==== Southern Section ====
6 December 2016	Yeovil Town (4)	4–1	Milton Keynes Dons (3)	Yeovil
19:45 GMT	Dawson 49' (pen.); Zoko 62' (pen.); Lacey 73'; Whitfield 79'	Report	Lacey 24' (og.)	Stadium: Huish Park; Attendance: 1,308; Referee: Lee Swabey

6 December 2016	AFC Wimbledon (3)	1–2	Brighton & Hove Albion U21	Norbiton, London
19:45 GMT	Barnett 68'	Report	Manu 38'; Towell 45+2' (pen.)	Stadium: Kingsmeadow; Attendance: 497; Referee: Charles Breakspear

6 December 2016	Swindon Town (3)	2–3	Luton Town (4)	Swindon
19:45 GMT	Norris 6'; Iandolo 62'	Report	McQuoid 9', 19'; Vassell 69'	Stadium: County Ground; Attendance: 1,692; Referee: Roger East

7 December 2016	Coventry City (3)	1–0	Crawley Town (4)	Coventry
19:45 GMT	Sordell 28'	Report		Stadium: Ricoh Arena; Attendance: 1,338; Referee: Graham Horwood

21 December 2016	Southampton U21	1–1 (3–4 p)	Reading U21	Southampton
19:00 GMT	Isgrove 30'		Keown 50'	Stadium: St Mary's Stadium; Attendance: 1,679; Referee: Lee Collins
	Penalties
	Jones (penalty missed); O'Connor (penalty missed); Slattery (penalty scored); Little (penalty scored); Isgrove (penalty scored)		Cooper (penalty scored); Wieser (penalty scored); Watson (penalty scored); Frost (penalty missed); Méïte (penalty scored)

6 December 2016	Norwich City U21	0–1	Swansea City U21	Norwich
19:00 GMT		Report	McBurnie 74'	Stadium: Carrow Road; Attendance: 785; Referee: Darren Deadman

6 December 2016	Southend United (3)	1–1 (3–4 p)	Oxford United (3)	Southend-on-Sea
19:45 GMT	Wordsworth 86'	Report	Maguire 81'	Stadium: Roots Hall; Attendance: 2,004; Referee: Trevor Kettle
	Penalties
	Cox (penalty missed); Demetriou (penalty scored); Wordsworth (penalty scored); Leonard (penalty scored); McLaughlin (penalty missed)		Maguire (penalty scored); Hemmings (penalty scored); Edwards (penalty scored); Johnson (penalty missed); Roberts (penalty scored)

7 December 2016	Millwall (3)	1–3	Wycombe Wanderers (4)	Bermondsey, London
19:45 GMT	Worrall 53'	Report	Akinfenwa 51' (pen.); Thompson 85', 90+1'	Stadium: The Den; Attendance: 1,619; Referee: Dean Whitestone

=== Round 3 ===
The third round draw was made on 8 December 2016. The sixteen remaining teams were drawn into eight ties as a "free draw."

10 January 2017	Mansfield Town (4)	2–0	Oldham Athletic (3)	Mansfield
19:45 GMT	Hoban 84', 90+2'	Report		Stadium: Field Mill; Attendance: 1,343; Referee: Darren Drysdale

10 January 2017	Luton Town (4)	4–0	Chesterfield (3)	Luton
19:45 GMT	Mackail-Smith 23' (pen.); Marriott 25', 51'; Vassell 86'	Report		Stadium: Kenilworth Road; Attendance: 1,655; Referee: Charles Breakspear

10 January 2017	Oxford United (3)	4–1	Scunthorpe United (3)	Oxford
19:45 GMT	Johnson 19'; Hemmings 23', 50' (pen.), 90+3'	Report	Williams 11'	Stadium: Kassam Stadium; Attendance: 1,383; Referee: Gavin Ward

10 January 2017	Blackpool (4)	1–1 (4–5 p)	Wycombe Wanderers (4)	Blackpool
19:00 GMT	Mellor 9'	Report	Stewart 77'	Stadium: Bloomfield Road; Attendance: 766; Referee: Eddie Ilderton
	Penalties
	Philliskirk (penalty scored); Cain (penalty scored); Redshaw (penalty scored); Gnanduillet (penalty scored); Aimson (penalty missed)		Jacobson (penalty scored); O'Nien (penalty scored); De Havilland (penalty scored); Akinfenwa (penalty scored); Thompson (penalty scored)

17 January 2017	Cheltenham Town (4)	0–1	Bradford City (3)	Cheltenham
19:45 GMT		Report	Hiwula 64'	Stadium: LCI Rail Stadium; Attendance: 1,081; Referee: Brendan Malone

10 January 2017	Yeovil Town (4)	4–2	Reading U21	Yeovil
19:00 GMT	Khan 24'; Zoko 32'; Sowunmi 65'; Sheppard 88' (o.g.)	Report	Novakovich 45'; Barrett 90+2' (pen.)	Stadium: Huish Park; Attendance: 1,081; Referee: John Brooks

10 January 2017	Coventry City (3)	3–0	Brighton & Hove Albion U21	Coventry
19:45 GMT	Lameiras 41'; G. Thomas 51'; Haynes 88'	Report		Stadium: Ricoh Arena; Attendance: 2,085; Referee: Robert Lewis

10 January 2017	Swansea City U21	2–1	Wolverhampton Wanderers U21	Swansea
19:00 GMT	McBurnie 47', 87'		Herc 13'	Stadium: Liberty Stadium; Attendance: 980; Referee: Tim Robinson

=== Quarter-finals ===
The quarter-final draw took place on 12 January 2017. The eight remaining teams were drawn into four ties as a "free draw."

24 January 2017	Mansfield Town (4)	1–2	Wycombe Wanderers (4)	Mansfield
19:45 GMT	Green 34' (pen.)	Report	Kashket 73'; Akinfenwa 81'	Stadium: Field Mill; Attendance: 2,047; Referee: David Webb

24 January 2017	Swansea City U21	1–1 (2–4 p)	Coventry City (3)	Swansea
19:30 GMT	McBurnie 70' (pen.)	Report	Marić 85' (o.g.)	Stadium: Liberty Stadium; Attendance: 3,356; Referee: Mark Heywood
	Penalties
	Lewis (penalty scored); Biabi (penalty missed); Byers (penalty scored); Blair (penalty missed)		Thomas (penalty scored); Bigirimana (penalty scored); Reid (penalty scored); Lameiras (penalty scored)

31 January 2017	Oxford United (3)	2–1	Bradford City (3)	Oxford
19:45 GMT	Maguire 53' (pen.); Johnson 55'	Report	Hiwula-Mayifuila 85'	Stadium: Kassam Stadium; Attendance: 2,274; Referee: Dean Whitestone

7 February 2017	Luton Town (4)	5–2	Yeovil Town (4)	Luton
19:45 GMT	Cook 12'; Sheehan 50'; Vassell 60', 90+3'; Hylton 66'	Report	Zoko 58'; Sowunmi 65'	Stadium: Kenilworth Road; Attendance: 2,480; Referee: Ben Toner

=== Semi-finals ===
The semi-final draw took place on 26 January 2017. The four remaining teams were drawn into two ties as a "free draw."

7 February 2017	Coventry City (3)	2–1	Wycombe Wanderers (4)	Ricoh Arena, Coventry
19:45	Beavon 11'; G. Thomas 19'	Report	Akinfenwa 55'	Attendance: 11,672; Referee: Darren England

1 March 2017	Luton Town (4)	2–3	Oxford United (3)	Kenilworth Road, Luton
19:45	Vassell 72'; Hylton 82'	Report	Edwards 10'; Mpanzu 69' (o.g.); Johnson 85'	Attendance: 6,901; Referee: Nigel Miller

=== Final ===
2 April 2017
14:30 BST

Coventry City	2–1	Oxford United
Bigirimana 11'; G. Thomas 55'	Report	Sercombe 75'

Wembley Stadium, London
Attendance: 74,434
Referee: Chris Sarginson

== Match proceeds ==
After deduction of match expenses, all proceeds were split:

- 45% Home club
- 45% Away club
- 10% to the pool account
