= Cain (surname) =

Cain is a surname. Notable people with the surname include:

- Andrew Cain (boxer) (born 1996), English professional boxer
- Arthur Cain (1921–1999), British evolutionary biologist and ecologist
- Bill Cain (born c. 1947), American playwright and Jesuit priest
- Bill Cain (athletic director) (1933–2022), American college football player and athletic director
- Blue Cain (born 2004), American basketball player
- Bryce Cain (born 2006), American football player
- Briscoe Cain (born 1984), American politician
- Carl Cain (1934–2024), American basketball player
- Chris Cain (born 1955), jazz and blues guitarist
- Cindi Cain, Canadian country music artist
- Cyril Edward Cain (1883–1963), American educator and historian
- D. Jamison Cain (1926–2010), American government official
- Dean Cain (born 1966), American actor
- Deon Cain (born 1996), American football player
- Elizabeth Cain (born 1962), Australian ice skater
- Fraser Cain, founder of the website Universe Today
- Hannah Cain (born 1999), Wales international footballer
- Henri Cain (1857–1937), French playwright and librettist
- Herb Cain (1913–1982), Canadian professional ice hockey player
- Herman Cain (1945–2020), American businessman, talk show host, and candidate for the 2012 Republican presidential nomination
- Jackie Cain (1928–2014), American jazz vocalist
- James M. Cain (1892–1977), American crime writer
- John Cain (disambiguation), multiple people
- Johnny Cain (1908–1977), American football player, college sports coach, and administrator
- Jonathan Cain (born 1950), musician
- Joseph Hilliard Cain Sr. (1892–1962), American military officer and politician
- LeRoy E. Cain (born 1964), American aerospace engineer who worked for NASA
- Lorenzo Cain (born 1986), American baseball center fielder
- Matt Cain (born 1984), American baseball pitcher
- Matt Cain (writer), British writer and broadcaster
- Michael Cain (musician) (born 1966), American pianist and composer
- Michael Cain (footballer) (born 1994), English footballer
- Mick Cain (rugby union) (1885–1951), New Zealand rugby union player
- Minerva Ruffin Cain (1820–1890), American political hostess
- Myrtle Cain (1894–1980), American politician
- Noah Cain (born 2000), American football player
- Nyoshia Cain (born 1994), Trinidad and Tobago Paralympic athlete
- Patrick Cain (born 1962), American football player
- Paul Cain (author) (1928–1966), American writer
- Paul Cain (minister) (1929–2019), American Pentecostal minister
- Randy Cain (1945–2009), American soul singer, member of the vocal group The Delfonics
- Richard Cain (1931–1973), Chicago police officer who worked with organized crime
- Robert Henry Cain (1909–1974), British soldier, recipient of the Victoria Cross
- Ross Cain (1957–2011), Nauruan politician
- Roy Franklin Cain (1906–1998), Canadian bryologist and mycologist—see Coniochaetaceae
- Scotty Cain (1920–1994), American racing driver
- Stanley A. Cain (1902–1995), American botanist and plant ecologist
- Stephen Cain (born 1970), Canadian poet and academic
- Stephen Cain (born 1984), Australian decathlete—see List of decathlon national champions (men)
- Susan Cain (born 1968), American non-fiction writer and lecturer
- Syd Cain (1918–2011), British production designer
- Tim Cain, American video game programmer
- Tyler Cain (born 1988), American basketball player
- William Cain (disambiguation)

== See also ==
- Judge Cain (disambiguation)
- Senator Cain (disambiguation)
- Caine (surname)
- Kain (surname)
- Kane (surname)
- Cayne (disambiguation)
