= 2016–17 Blackpool F.C. season =

English football club season

Blackpool
2016–17 season
- Owner: Owen Oyston
- Chairman: Karl Oyston
- Manager: Gary Bowyer
- Stadium: Bloomfield Road; Blackpool, England (Capacity: 17,338)
- League Two: 7th (promoted to League One)
- FA Cup: Fourth round
- League Cup: Second round
- Football League Trophy: Third round
- Top goalscorer: League: Mark Cullen (13 goals); All: Mark Cullen; Brad Potts; Kyle Vassell (13 each)
- Highest home attendance: 5,471 vs Carlisle United
- Lowest home attendance: 760 vs Cheltenham Town (Checkatrade trophy)
- Average home league attendance: 3,581
Home colours	Away colours

The 2016–17 season was Blackpool F.C.'s 108th season in the Football League, and their first season back in League Two following back-to-back relegations from the 2014–15 Football League Championship and 2015–16 Football League One. Along with competing in League Two, the club also participated in the FA Cup, League Cup and Football League Trophy. The season covers the period from 1 July 2016 to 30 June 2017.

== Transfers ==
=== Transfers in ===
Date from	Position	Nationality	Name	From	Fee	Ref.
1 July 2016	LM	(England)	Colin Daniel	Port Vale	Free transfer	
1 July 2016	CF	(Jamaica)	Jamille Matt	Fleetwood Town	Free transfer	
1 July 2016	LB	(England)	Andy Taylor	Walsall	Free transfer	
1 July 2016	CF	(England)	Kyle Vassell	Peterborough United	Free transfer	
4 July 2016	RB	(England)	Kelvin Mellor	Plymouth Argyle	Free transfer	
18 July 2016	LB	(England)	Danny Pugh	Bury	Free transfer	
19 July 2016	GK	(England)	Sam Slocombe	Oxford United	Free transfer	
2 August 2016	CB	(Republic of Ireland)	Eddie Nolan	York City	Free transfer	
19 August 2016	CF	(Ivory Coast)	Armand Gnanduillet	Leyton Orient	Undisclosed	
25 August 2016	CM	(England)	Jack Payne	Peterborough United	Free transfer	
31 August 2016	GK	(England)	Dean Lyness	Burton Albion	Free transfer	
21 January 2017	CF	(England)	Nathan Delfouneso	Swindon Town	Free transfer	
31 January 2017	ST	(Portugal)	Raúl Correia	Radcliffe Borough	Undisclosed	
18 February 2017	DM	(Scotland)	Ian Black	Shrewsbury Town	Free transfer	

=== Transfers out ===
Date from	Position	Nationality	Name	To	Fee	Ref.
1 July 2016	RB	(Barbados)	Emmerson Boyce	Free agent	Released	
1 July 2016	LB	(Republic of Ireland)	Charles Dunne	Oldham Athletic (Note: Following Charles Dunne being released, he later signed for Oldham Athletic.)	Released	
1 July 2016	LB	(England)	David Ferguson	Shildon	Released	
1 July 2016	CM	(England)	David Norris	Leatherhead (Note: Following David Norris being released, he later signed for Leatherhead.)	Released	
1 July 2016	DM	(England)	Connor Oliver	North Ferriby United (Note: Following Connor Oliver being released, he later signed for North Ferriby United.)	Released	
1 July 2016	CF	(Northern Ireland)	Martin Paterson	Port Vale (Note: Following Martin Paterson being released, he later signed for Port Vale.)	Released	
1 July 2016	RM	(England)	Jarrett Rivers	Blyth Spartans (Note: Following Jarrett Rivers being released, he later signed for Blyth Spartans.)	Released	
1 July 2016	CB	(England)	Sam Roscoe	Aberdeen	Free transfer	
11 July 2016	CF	(England)	Dion Charles	Fleetwood Town	Free transfer	
12 July 2016	GK	(Republic of Ireland)	Colin Doyle	Bradford City	£1	
12 August 2016	RB	(England)	Alieu Njie	Lewes	Free transfer	
25 August 2016	GK	(Wales)	Kyle Letheren	York City	Free transfer	
30 January 2017	LW	(Republic of Ireland)	Mark Yeates	Notts County	Undisclosed	
31 January 2017	LB	(England)	Danny Pugh	Port Vale	Free transfer	

=== Loans in ===
Date from	Position	Nationality	Name	From	Date until	Ref.
5 August 2016	CM	(England)	Michael Cain	Leicester City	End of Season	
20 January 2017	LW	(England)	Sanmi Odelusi	Wigan Athletic	End of Season	
30 January 2017	CM	(England)	Jordan Flores	Wigan Athletic	End of Season	
31 January 2017	CM	(Guyana)	Neil Danns	Bury	End of Season	

=== Loans out ===
Date from	Position	Nationality	Name	To	Date until	Ref.
26 August 2016	RB	(England)	Macauley Wilson	Bamber Bridge	23 September 2016	
1 September 2016	AM	(Scotland)	John Herron	Dunfermline Athletic	1 January 2017	
28 October 2016	LB	(England)	Luke Higham	Nuneaton Town	25 November 2016	
10 November 2016	RB	(England)	Macauley Wilson	AFC Fylde	End of Season (Note: On 19 January 2017, Macauley Wilson's loan deal at AFC Fylde was extended until the end of the season.)	
20 January 2017	CF	(England)	Jack Redshaw	Rochdale	End of Season	

== Competitions ==
=== Pre-season friendlies ===
23 July 2016 Friendly	Blackpool	1–1	Blackburn Rovers	Blackpool
15:00 BST	Vassell 19'	Report	Graham 44'	Stadium: Bloomfield Road

26 July 2016 Friendly	Tranmere Rovers	0–0	Blackpool	Tranmere
19:45 BST		Report		Stadium: Prenton Park

30 July 2016 Friendly	Blackpool	1–1	Bury	Blackpool
15:00 BST	Potts 89'	Report	Etuhu 51'	Stadium: Bloomfield Road

=== League Two ===
==== League table ====
Pos	Team	Pld	W	D	L	GF	GA	GD	Pts	Promotion, qualification or relegation
5	Exeter City	46	21	8	17	75	56	+19	71	Qualification for League Two play-offs (Note: Four teams play for one spot and promotion to EFL League One)
6	Carlisle United	46	18	17	11	69	68	+1	71	Qualification for League Two play-offs
7	Blackpool (O, P)	46	18	16	12	69	46	+23	70	Qualification for League Two play-offs
8	Colchester United	46	19	12	15	67	57	+10	69	
9	Wycombe Wanderers	46	19	12	15	58	53	+5	69	

Updated to match(es) played on 6 May 2017. Source: BBC Sport
Rules for classification: 1) Points; 2) Goal difference; 3) Number of goals scored
(O) Play-off winners; (P) Promoted

==== Results by matchday ====
Round	1	2	3	4	5	6	7	8	9	10	11	12	13	14	15	16	17	18	19	20	21	22	23	24	25	26	27	28	29	30	31	32	33	34	35	36	37	38	39	40	41	42	43	44	45	46
Ground	H	A	A	H	H	A	A	H	A	H	A	H	A	H	A	H	A	A	H	A	H	A	A	H	A	H	H	H	A	A	H	A	H	H	A	A	H	A	H	A	H	H	A	H	A	H
Result	W	L	D	D	L	W	L	D	D	W	L	D	L	W	D	W	W	L	W	W	L	W	D	L	D	D	D	D	W	L	D	D	D	W	W	D	W	W	W	L	L	D	W	W	L	W
Position	2	10	11	12	17	11	15	18	16	13	16	15	17	14	15	9	7	10	7	7	8	8	8	10	12	13	14	14	11	12	14	15	15	11	10	9	8	8	5	8	8	8	7	6	7	7

Source: Statto.com
A = Away; H = Home; W = Win; D = Draw; L = Loss

==== Matches ====
6 August 2016 1	Blackpool	2–0	Exeter City	Blackpool
15:00 BST	Vassell 20'; Pugh (yellow card) 36'; Brown 52' (o.g.)	Report	Woodman (yellow card) 35'; Brown (yellow card) 45+1'; Harley (yellow card) 81'	Stadium: Bloomfield Road; Attendance: 3,754; Referee: John Brooks

13 August 2016 2	Morecambe	2–1	Blackpool	Morecambe
15:00 BST	Wakefield (yellow card) 41'; Dunn 45+3' (pen.); Rose (yellow card) 70' (goal) 76'	Report	Taylor (yellow card) 4'; Potts 23'; Robertson (yellow card) 59'	Stadium: Globe Arena; Attendance: 3,676; Referee: Geoff Eltringham

16 August 2016 3	Barnet	1–1	Blackpool	Canons Park
19:45 BST	Togwell (yellow card) 44'; Dembélé (yellow card) 78'; Akinde 90+4'	Report	Cullen 24' (yellow card) 64'; Slocombe (yellow card) 53'; Osayi-Samuel (yellow card) 67'	Stadium: The Hive Stadium; Attendance: 1,502; Referee: John Busby

20 August 2016 4	Blackpool	0–0	Wycombe Wanderers	Blackpool
15:00 BST	Robertson (yellow card) 46'; Pugh (yellow card) 70'	Report	Hayes (yellow card) 81'	Stadium: Bloomfield Road; Attendance: 3,144; Referee: Ollie Yates

27 August 2016 5	Blackpool	0–1	Plymouth Argyle	Blackpool
15:00 BST	Payne (red card) 70'; Robertson (yellow card) 90+1'	Report	Bulvītis 50'; Spencer (yellow card) 76'; Songo'o (yellow card) 80'	Stadium: Bloomfield Road; Attendance: 3,085; Referee: Nigel Miller

3 September 2016 6	Yeovil Town	0–3	Blackpool	Yeovil
15:00 BST	Shephard (yellow card) 82'	Report	Vassell (yellow card) 45'; Daniel 59', 83' (yellow card) 80'; Gnanduillet 87'; Aldred (yellow card) 90+3'	Stadium: Huish Park; Attendance: 3,108; Referee: Graham Horwood

10 September 2016 7	Colchester United	3–2	Blackpool	Colchester
15:00 BST	Lapslie (yellow card) 27'; Szmodics 36'; Prosser (yellow card) 45+1'; Porter 56', 84'; Fosu (yellow card) 67'	Report	Gnanduillet 13'; Aldred (yellow card) 40'; Potts 89'	Stadium: Weston Homes Community Stadium; Attendance: 3,077; Referee: Brendan Malone

17 September 2016 8	Blackpool	2–2	Carlisle United	Blackpool
15:00 BST	Vassell 59'; Payne (yellow card) 62'; Gnanduillet 74'	Report	Wyke 51'; Raynes 58'	Stadium: Bloomfield Road; Attendance: 5,471; Referee: James Adcock

24 September 2016 9	Crewe Alexandra	1–1	Blackpool	Crewe
15:00 BST	Lowe 71'; Guthrie (yellow card) 85'	Report	Guthrie 10' (o.g.); Mellor (yellow card) 65'; Aldred (yellow card) 69'; McAlister (yellow card) 87'	Stadium: Alexandra Stadium; Attendance: 4,185; Referee: Carl Boyeson

27 September 2016 10	Blackpool	3–1	Portsmouth	Blackpool
19:45 BST	Mellor 18'; Potts 49'; Vassell 65'; Gnanduillet (yellow card) 76'	Report	Chaplin 34'; Bennett (yellow card) 70'; Doyle (yellow card) 86'	Stadium: Bloomfield Road; Attendance: 3,055; Referee: David Webb

1 October 2016 11	Crawley Town	1–0	Blackpool	Crawley
15:00 BST	Connolly (yellow card) 50' (goal) 69'	Report		Stadium: Checkatrade.com Stadium; Attendance: 2,300; Referee: Brett Huxtable

8 October 2016 12	Blackpool	1–1	Cambridge United	Blackpool
15:00 BST	Robertson (yellow card) 29'; Philliskirk (penalty missed) 33'; Vassell (yellow card) 86'; Taylor 90+2'	Report	Berry 17'; Dunk (yellow card) 33'	Stadium: Bloomfield Road; Attendance: 3,070; Referee: Richard Clark

15 October 2016 13	Accrington Stanley	2–1	Blackpool	Accrington
15:00 BST	Brown (yellow card) 80'; Boco 89' (pen.), 90+4'; Conneely (yellow card) 90'	Report	Cain 81'	Stadium: Wham Stadium; Attendance: 2,754; Referee: Andy Haines

22 October 2016 14	Blackpool	4–2	Doncaster Rovers	Blackpool
15:00 BST	Potts 25', 47' (yellow card) 35'; Mellor 39'; Vassell 48' (yellow card) 72'; Slocombe (yellow card) 87'	Report	Taylor 1' (o.g.); Rowe 66' (pen.); Mason (yellow card) 82'	Stadium: Bloomfield Road; Attendance: 3,623; Referee: Dean Whitestone

29 October 2016 15	Cheltenham Town	2–2	Blackpool	Cheltenham
15:00 BST	Dickie (yellow card) 9'; Dayton 18'; Downes (yellow card) 34'; Storer (yellow card) 43'; Wright 45+3'; Cranston (yellow card) 53'; Pell (yellow card) 75'	Report	Slocombe (yellow card) 16'; Vassell 45', 47'; Payne (yellow card) 45+3'; Aldred (yellow card) 90+5'	Stadium: LCI Rail Stadium; Attendance: 3,162; Referee: Gavin Ward

12 November 2016 16	Blackpool	4–0	Notts County	Blackpool
15:00 GMT	Vassell 20', 87'; Daniel 48'; Matt 52'; Taylor (yellow card) 63'; Gnanduillet (yellow card) 80'	Report	Milsom (yellow card) 60'; Oliver (red card) 79'; Duffy (yellow card) 90+2'	Stadium: Bloomfield Road; Attendance: 3,443; Referee: Robert Jones

19 November 2016 17	Leyton Orient	1–2	Blackpool	Leyton, London
15:00 GMT	Weir (yellow card) 64'; McCallum 89'	Report	Matt 30'; Aldred (yellow card) 51' (goal) 57'; Daniel (yellow card) 59'; Taylor (yellow card) 80'	Stadium: Matchroom Stadium; Attendance: 4,376; Referee: Brendan Malone

22 November 2016 18	Mansfield Town	1–0	Blackpool	Mansfield
19:45 GMT	Clements (yellow card) 55'; Green (yellow card) 66'; Rose 90+3' (yellow card) 90+4'	Report	Pugh (yellow card) 37'; Daniel (yellow card) 77'	Stadium: One Call Stadium; Attendance: 2,801; Referee: Darren Handley

26 November 2016 19	Blackpool	4–1	Newport County	Blackpool
15:00 GMT	Potts 4'; Matt (yellow card) 26'; Taylor (yellow card) 55'; Payne 61'; Vassell 72'; Mellor 83'	Report	Healey 21'; Jebb (yellow card) 40'; Randall (yellow card) 45'; Rigg (penalty missed) 55'; Sheehan (yellow card) 80'; Jones (yellow card) 85'	Stadium: Bloomfield Road; Attendance: 3,062; Referee: Mark Heywood

10 December 2016 20	Stevenage	0–2	Blackpool	Stevenage
15:00 GMT	Pett (yellow card) 64'; Schumacher (yellow card) 83'	Report	Aldred (yellow card) 38'; Philliskirk (yellow card) 51'; Osayi-Samuel 77'; Cullen 84'	Stadium: The Lamex Stadium; Attendance: 2,513; Referee: John Brooks

17 December 2016 21	Blackpool	0–2	Luton Town	Blackpool
15:00 GMT		Report	Marriott 31'; McGeehan 48'	Stadium: Bloomfield Road; Attendance: 3,992; Referee: Peter Bankes

26 December 2016 22	Hartlepool United	0–1	Blackpool	Hartlepool
15:00 GMT		Report	Cullen 64'	Stadium: Victoria Park; Attendance: 3,767; Referee: Geoff Eltringham

31 December 2016 23	Grimsby Town	0–0	Blackpool	Cleethorpes
15:00 GMT		Report	Osayi-Samuel (yellow card) 41'; Aldred (yellow card) 89'	Stadium: Blundell Park; Attendance: 5,637; Referee: Darren England

2 January 2017 24	Blackpool	0–1	Mansfield Town	Blackpool
15:00 GMT		Report	Green 29'; Byrom (yellow card) 64'; Hamilton (yellow card) 83'	Stadium: Bloomfield Road; Attendance: 2,948; Referee: Rob Jones

14 January 2017 25	Cambridge United	0–0	Blackpool	Cambridge
15:00 GMT	Berry (penalty missed) 77'	Report	Potts (yellow card) 43'; McAlister (yellow card) 57'; Payne (yellow card) 68'; Aldred (red card) 76'; Aimson (yellow card) 90+3'	Stadium: The R Costings Abbey Stadium; Attendance: 4,248; Referee: Darren Drysdale

21 January 2017 26	Blackpool	2–2	Yeovil Town	Blackpool
15:00 GMT	Mellor 70'; Delfouneso 90+5'	Report	Zoko 34'; Ward 80'	Stadium: Bloomfield Road; Attendance: 2,885; Referee: Carl Boyeson

4 February 2017 27	Blackpool	1–1	Colchester United	Blackpool
15:00 GMT	Matt 12'; Taylor (yellow card) 67'; Daniel (yellow card) 90+6'	Report	Guthrie 18'; Eastman (yellow card) 68'; Briggs (yellow card) 77'; Murray (red card) 90+5'	Stadium: Bloomfield Road; Attendance: 2,772; Referee: Seb Stockbridge

7 February 2017 28	Blackpool	0–0	Crawley Town	Blackpool
19:45 GMT		Report		Stadium: Bloomfield Road; Attendance: 2,080; Referee: Nigel Miller

11 February 2017 29	Carlisle United	1–4	Blackpool	Carlisle
15:00 GMT	Raynes (yellow card) 64'; Ibehre 69'	Report	Potts 33'; Daniel (yellow card) 50'; Flores 56'; Robertson (yellow card) 62'; Odelusi 83'; Delfouneso 86'; Matt (yellow card) 89'	Stadium: Brunton Park; Attendance: 6,170; Referee: Mark Haywood

14 February 2017 30	Portsmouth	2–0	Blackpool	Portsmouth
19:45 GMT	Burgess (yellow card) 11'; Evans 27'; Roberts (yellow card) 36'; Bennett (yellow card) 81'; Doyle 90+5'	Report	Mellor (yellow card) 21'	Stadium: Fratton Park; Attendance: 15,132; Referee: Darren Deadman

18 February 2017 31	Blackpool	2–2	Crewe Alexandra	Blackpool
15:00 GMT	Delfouneso 8'; Aldred 27'	Report	Dagnall 62'; Turton 88'	Stadium: Bloomfield Road; Attendance: 3,389; Referee: Ben Toner

25 February 2017 32	Exeter City	2–2	Blackpool	Exeter
15:00 GMT	Brown (yellow card) 28'; Watkins 45+5'; J. Taylor (yellow card) 57'; Reid 90+1'	Report	Daniel 18' (yellow card) 47'; Potts 39'; Matt (yellow card) 45+2'; Flores (yellow card) 55'; Black (yellow card) 69'	Stadium: St James Park; Attendance: 4,125; Referee: Kevin Johnson

28 February 2017 33	Blackpool	2–2	Barnet	Blackpool
15:00 GMT	Delfouneso 59'; Vassell 90'	Report	Akinde 13'; Clough 47'	Stadium: Bloomfield Road; Attendance: 2,094; Referee: Eddie Ilderton

4 March 2017 34	Blackpool	3–1	Morecambe	Blackpool
15:00 GMT	Cullen 14'; Potts 54'; Edwards 80' (o.g.)	Report	Evans 83'	Stadium: Bloomfield Road; Attendance: 3,453; Referee: Tony Harrington

7 March 2017 35	Plymouth Argyle	0–3	Blackpool	Plymouth
19:45 GMT	Threlkeld (yellow card) 52'; Spencer (yellow card) 52'	Report	Cullen 27'; Potts 30'; Aldred (yellow card) 32'; Daniel (yellow card) 53'; Flores 62'	Stadium: Home Park; Attendance: 10,568; Referee: John Busby

11 March 2017 36	Wycombe Wanderers	0–0	Blackpool	High Wycombe
15:00 GMT	Bean (yellow card) 68'; O'Nien (yellow card) 82'	Report	Flores (yellow card) 73'	Stadium: Adams Park; Attendance: 3,774; Referee: Chris Sarginson

14 March 2017 37	Blackpool	1–0	Stevenage	Blackpool
19:45 GMT	Cullen 15' (pen.); Payne (yellow card) 83'; Daniel (yellow card) 89'; Delfouneso (yellow card) 90+4'	Report	Franks (yellow card) 62'; Pett (yellow card) 88'; Wilkinson (yellow card) 90+5'	Stadium: Bloomfield Road; Attendance: 2,456; Referee: Ross Joyce

18 March 2017 38	Newport County	1–3	Blackpool	Newport
15:00 GMT	Bennett (yellow card) 23'; Pipe (yellow card) 59'; Samuel 74'; Butler (yellow card) 90+2'	Report	Osayi-Samuel 16', 90+5' (yellow card) 90+2'; Cullen 68' (pen.)	Stadium: Rodney Parade; Attendance: 2,427; Referee: Brett Huxtable

25 March 2017 39	Blackpool	2–1	Hartlepool United	Blackpool
15:00 GMT	Osayi-Samuel 21'; Danns (yellow card) 64'; Vassell 80'	Report	Alessandra 18'; Donnelly (yellow card) 36'; Featherstone (yellow card) 45+1'; Thomas (yellow card) 74'	Stadium: Bloomfield Road; Attendance: 5,374; Referee: Darren England

1 April 2017 40	Luton Town	1–0	Blackpool	Luton
15:00 GMT	Lee (yellow card) 76'; Palmer 90'	Report	Danns (yellow card) 52'	Stadium: Kenilworth Road; Attendance: 7,968; Referee: Chris Kavanagh

8 April 2017 41	Blackpool	1–3	Grimsby Town	Blackpool
15:00 BST	Boyce 43' (o.g.); Potts (yellow card) 86'; Black (yellow card) 89'; Aldred (yellow card) 90+1'	Report	Collins 17'; Jones 45+3', 70'; Gunning (yellow card) 86'	Stadium: Bloomfield Road; Attendance: 4,668; Referee: Darren Deadman

14 April 2017 42	Blackpool	0–0	Accrington Stanley	Blackpool
15:00 BST	Robertson (yellow card) 57'; Odelusi (yellow card) 72'	Report	Hughes (yellow card) 66'; Rodgers (yellow card) 86'; McCartan (yellow card) 89'	Stadium: Bloomfield Road; Attendance: 4,300; Referee: Mark Brown

17 April 2017 43	Doncaster Rovers	0–1	Blackpool	Doncaster
15:00 BST	Blair (yellow card) 4' (yellow-red card) 52'; Wright (yellow card) 35'; Baudry (yellow card) 87'; Marquis (yellow card) 90+7'	Report	Flores 90+1' (pen.)	Stadium: Keepmoat Stadium; Attendance: 6,914; Referee: Carl Boyeson

22 April 2017 44	Blackpool	3–0	Cheltenham Town	Blackpool
15:00 BST	Cullen 28'; Robertson 34'; Daniel (yellow card) 59'; Danns 62'	Report		Stadium: Bloomfield Road; Attendance: 3,775; Referee: Robert Jones

29 April 2017 45	Notts County	1–0	Blackpool	Nottingham
15:00 BST	Duffy 34'; Milsom (yellow card) 74'	Report		Stadium: Meadow Lane; Attendance: 7,108; Referee: Dean Whitestone

6 May 2017 46	Blackpool	3–1	Leyton Orient	Blackpool
17:30 BST	Danns 11'; Cullen 36'; Taylor 65'	Report	Janse 50'	Stadium: Bloomfield Road; Attendance: 3,602; Referee: David Webb

==== Play-offs ====
14 May 2017 Semi-final first leg	Blackpool	3–2	Luton Town	Blackpool
18:30 BST	Cullen 19', 47', 67' (pen.)	Report	Potts 26'; Vassell 28'; Sheehan (yellow card) 63'; D'Ath (yellow card) 77'	Stadium: Bloomfield Road; Attendance: 3,882; Referee: Nigel Miller

18 May 2017 Semi-final second leg	Luton Town	3–3 (5–6 agg.)	Blackpool	Luton
19:45 BST	Mellor 36' (o.g.); Cuthbert 45'; Hylton 56' (pen.); D'Ath (yellow card) 60'; Lee (yellow card) 80'	Report	Delfouneso 22'; Mellor (yellow card) 36'; Taylor (yellow card) 44'; Gnanduillet (yellow card) 62' (goal) 76'; Moore 90+4' (o.g.)	Stadium: Kenilworth Road; Attendance: 10,032; Referee: Darren Deadman

28 May 2017 Final	Blackpool	2–1	Exeter City	Wembley, London
15:00 BST	Potts 3'; Cullen (yellow card) 58' (goal) 64'; Osayi-Samuel (yellow card) 65'; Slocombe (yellow card) 90+1'; Flores (yellow card) 90+3'; Daniel (yellow card) 90+5'	Report	Wheeler 40'	Stadium: Wembley Stadium; Attendance: 23,380; Referee: Darren England

=== FA Cup ===
6 November 2016 First round	Blackpool	2–0	Kidderminster Harriers	Blackpool
14:00 GMT	Matt 27'; Potts 37'; Vassell (yellow card) 63'	Report		Stadium: Bloomfield Road; Attendance: 1,963; Referee: Martin Coy

3 December 2016 Second round	Blackpool	1–0	Brackley Town	Blackpool
15:00 GMT	Matt 6'; Potts (yellow card) 56'	Report	Armson (yellow card) 65'	Stadium: Bloomfield Road; Attendance: 1,764; Referee: Ross Joyce

7 January 2017 Third round	Blackpool	0–0	Barnsley	Blackpool
15:00 GMT		Report	Scowen (yellow card) 63'	Stadium: Bloomfield Road; Attendance: 4,875; Referee: Chris Sarginson

17 January 2017 Third round replay	Barnsley	1–2	Blackpool	Barnsley
19:45 GMT	Scowen (yellow card) 45+1'; MacDonald 49' (yellow card) 112'; Hammill (yellow card) 65'	Report	Mellor 30'; Aldred (yellow card) 66'; Osayi-Samuel (yellow card) 80' (goal) 120+1'	Stadium: Oakwell; Attendance: 5,558; Referee: Roger East

28 January 2017 Fourth round	Blackburn Rovers	2–0	Blackpool	Blackburn
15:00 GMT	Gallagher 9'; Bennett 22'	Report	McAllister (yellow card) 59'; Mellor (yellow card) 61' (yellow-red card) 65'	Stadium: Ewood Park; Attendance: 9,327; Referee: Peter Bankes

=== EFL Cup ===
9 August 2016 First round	Blackpool	4–2 (a.e.t.)	Bolton Wanderers	Blackpool
19:45 BST	Potts (yellow card) 73' (goal) 78'; Mellor 74'; McAlister 109'; Herron 115'	Report	Proctor 45+2'; Davies (yellow card) 84'; Woolery 90+5'	Stadium: Bloomfield Road; Attendance: 3,633; Referee: Darren Bond

23 August 2016 Second round	Crystal Palace	2–0	Blackpool	Selhurst
19:45 BST	Dann 25'; Wickham 47'	Report		Stadium: Selhurst Park; Attendance: 7,533; Referee: Andrew Madley

=== EFL Trophy ===
Pos	Div	Team	Pld	W	PW	PL	L	GF	GA	GD	Pts	Qualification
1	L2	Cheltenham Town	3	2	0	0	1	4	3	+1	6	Advance to Round 2
2	L2	Blackpool	3	1	1	0	1	3	3	0	5	Advance to Round 2
3	ACA	Everton U21	3	1	0	1	1	4	3	+1	4	
4	L1	Bolton Wanderers	3	1	0	0	2	1	3	−2	3	

Source: Sky Sports

30 August 2016 Group Stage Game 1	Blackpool	2–1	Cheltenham Town	Blackpool
19:45 BST	Higham (yellow card) 38'; Vassell 56', 58'		Smith (yellow card) 11'; Jennings 20'; Arthur (yellow card) 81'	Stadium: Bloomfield Road; Attendance: 760

4 October 2016 Group Stage Game 2	Bolton Wanderers	1–0	Blackpool	Bolton
19:00 BST	Sammy Ameobi 4'; Vela (yellow card) 63'	Report		Stadium: Macron Stadium; Attendance: 1,589

8 November 2016 Group Stage Game 3	Everton U-23	1–1 (4–5 p)	Blackpool	Liverpool
19:30 BST	Charsley 79'; Duffus (yellow card) 81'	Report	Gnanduillet 48'; Yeates (yellow card) 65'; Cullen (yellow card) 66'; Daniel (yellow card) 72'	Stadium: Goodison Park; Referee: Chris Kavanagh
	Penalties
	Gibson (penalty scored); Charsley (penalty scored); Jones (penalty scored); Henen (penalty scored); Yarney (penalty missed)		Philliskirk (penalty scored); Cain (penalty scored); Wilson (penalty scored); Cullen (penalty scored); Gnanduillet (penalty scored)

6 December 2016 Second round	Doncaster Rovers	1–1 (7–8 p)	Blackpool	Doncaster
19:00 GMT	Williams 52'	Report	Gnanduillet 24'	Stadium: Keepmoat Stadium; Attendance: 1,549; Referee: David Coote
	Penalties
	Middleton (penalty scored); Beestin (penalty scored); Keegan (penalty scored); Mandeville (penalty scored); Houghton (penalty missed); Calder (penalty scored); Mason (penalty scored); Baudry (penalty scored); Longbottom (penalty missed)		Philliskirk (penalty scored); Cullen (penalty scored); Redshaw (penalty scored); Roache (penalty scored); Yeates (penalty missed); Nolan (penalty scored); Cameron (penalty scored); Aimson (penalty scored); Higham (penalty scored)

10 January 2017 Third round	Blackpool	1–1 (4–5 p)	Wycombe Wanderers	Blackpool
19:00 GMT	Mellor 9'; Philliskirk (penalty missed) 33'	Report	Stewart 77'; O'Nien (yellow card) 84'	Stadium: Bloomfield Road; Attendance: 766; Referee: Eddie Ilderton
	Penalties
	Philliskirk (penalty scored); Cain (penalty scored); Redshaw (penalty scored); Gnanduillet (penalty scored); Aimson (penalty missed)		Jacobson (penalty scored); O'Nien (penalty scored) de Havilland (penalty scored); Akinfenwa (penalty scored); Thompson (penalty scored)

== Statistics ==
As of 7 May 2017

No.	Pos	Nat	Player	Total		League Two		FA Cup		League Cup		League Trophy	
No.	Pos	Nat	Player	Apps	Goals	Apps	Goals	Apps	Goals	Apps	Goals	Apps	Goals
1	GK	(England) ENG	Sam Slocombe	46	0	37+0	0	5+0	0	2+0	0	2+0	0
2	DF	(England) ENG	Kelvin Mellor	56	7	48+0	4	5+0	1	2+0	1	1+0	1
3	DF	(England) ENG	Andy Taylor	45	2	40+0	2	5+0	0	0+0	0	0+0	0
4	MF	(Scotland) SCO	Jim McAlister	32	1	18+4	0	4+1	0	2+0	1	3+0	0
5	DF	(Scotland) SCO	Clark Robertson	56	0	47+0	0	5+0	0	2+0	0	2+0	0
6	DF	(England) ENG	Will Aimson	31	0	18+3	0	3+0	0	2+0	0	5+0	0
7	FW	(England) ENG	Kyle Vassell	42	13	29+7	11	4+0	0	0+0	0	0+2	2
8	MF	(England) ENG	Brad Potts	52	13	45+0	11	3+0	1	1+1	1	2+0	0
9	FW	(England) ENG	Mark Cullen	40	13	20+10	13	3+1	0	1+0	0	5+0	0
11	MF	(New Zealand) NZL	Henry Cameron	2	0	0+0	0	0+0	0	0+1	0	0+1	0
12	MF	(England) ENG	Jordan Flores	21	3	14+7	3	0+0	0	0+0	0	0+0	0
14	MF	(Scotland) SCO	John Herron	2	1	0+0	0	0+0	0	0+2	1	0+0	0
15	DF	(Scotland) SCO	Tom Aldred	52	2	47+0	2	4+0	0	1+0	0	0+0	0
16	DF	(Republic of Ireland) IRL	Eddie Nolan	10	0	1+2	0	1+0	0	2+0	0	4+0	0
18	FW	(England) ENG	Danny Philliskirk	24	0	10+8	0	0+2	0	0+0	0	3+1	0
19	FW	(Jamaica) JAM	Jamille Matt	38	5	14+18	3	2+2	2	1+0	0	1+0	0
21	MF	(Nigeria) NGR	Bright Osayi-Samuel	42	5	13+20	4	2+2	1	0+1	0	3+1	0
23	MF	(England) ENG	Colin Daniel	41	4	28+7	4	0+1	0	2+0	0	3+0	0
24	MF	(England) ENG	Luke Higham	3	0	0+0	0	0+0	0	0+0	0	3+0	0
25	GK	(England) ENG	Myles Boney	3	0	0+1	0	0+0	0	0+0	0	1+1	0
26	MF	(England) ENG	Michael Cain	14	1	2+4	1	1+0	0	2+0	0	5+0	0
27	GK	(England) ENG	Dean Lyness	15	0	12+1	0	0+0	0	0+0	0	2+0	0
28	MF	(England) ENG	Jack Payne	44	1	35+3	1	4+0	0	0+0	0	1+1	0
29	MF	(England) ENG	Sanmi Odelusi	8	1	1+6	1	0+1	0	0+0	0	0+0	0
30	FW	(England) ENG	Nathan Delfouneso	20	6	17+3	6	0+0	0	0+0	0	0+0	0
31	FW	(Ivory Coast) CIV	Armand Gnanduillet	26	6	9+11	4	0+1	0	1+0	0	4+0	2
32	FW	(Republic of Ireland) IRL	Rowan Roache	1	0	0+0	0	0+0	0	0+0	0	0+1	0
33	MF	(England) ENG	Christian N'Guessan	0	0	0+0	0	0+0	0	0+0	0	0+0	0
34	MF	(United States) USA	Sebastien Des Pres	1	0	0+0	0	0+0	0	0+0	0	0+1	0
35	MF	(Guyana) GUY	Neil Danns	17	2	15+2	2	0+0	0	0+0	0	0+0	0
37	MF	(Scotland) SCO	Ian Black	13	0	1+12	0	0+0	0	0+0	0	0+0	0
Players out on loan:
10	FW	(England) ENG	Jack Redshaw	3	0	0+0	0	0+0	0	0+0	0	0+3	0
20	DF	(England) ENG	Macauley Wilson	1	0	0+0	0	0+0	0	0+0	0	1+0	0
Players that left the club:
17	MF	(Republic of Ireland) IRL	Mark Yeates	16	0	2+3	0	1+3	0	1+1	0	4+1	0
22	DF	(England) ENG	Danny Pugh	23	0	18+0	0	3+1	0	0+0	0	1+0	0

=== Goals record ===
As of 7 May 2017

Rank	No.	Nat.	Po.	Name	League Two	FA Cup	League Cup	League Trophy	Total
1	9	(England)	CF	Mark Cullen	13	0	0	0	13
1	7	(England)	CF	Kyle Vassell	11	0	0	2	13
1	8	(England)	CM	Brad Potts	11	1	1	0	13
2	2	(England)	RB	Kelvin Mellor	4	1	1	1	7
3	30	(England)	CF	Nathan Delfouneso	6	0	0	0	6
3	31	(Ivory Coast)	CF	Armand Gnanduillet	4	0	0	2	6
5	19	(Jamaica)	CF	Jamille Matt	3	2	0	0	5
5	21	(Nigeria)	RM	Bright Osayi-Samuel	4	1	0	0	5
7	23	(England)	LM	Colin Daniel	4	0	0	0	4
8	12	(England)	CM	Jordan Flores	3	0	0	0	3
9	3	(England)	LB	Andy Taylor	2	0	0	0	2
9	15	(Scotland)	CB	Tom Aldred	2	0	0	0	2
9	35	(Guyana)	CM	Neil Danns	2	0	0	0	2
12	4	(Scotland)	CM	Jim McAlister	0	0	1	0	1
12	14	(Scotland)	AM	John Herron	0	0	1	0	1
12	26	(England)	CM	Michael Cain	1	0	0	0	1
12	28	(England)	CM	Jack Payne	1	0	0	0	1
12	29	(England)	LW	Sanmi Odelusi	1	0	0	0	1
Own Goals					4	0	0	0	4
Total					77	5	4	5	90

=== Disciplinary record ===
As of 7 May 2017

Rank	No.	Nat.	Po.	Name	League Two			FA Cup			League Cup			League Trophy			Total		
Rank	No.	Nat.	Po.	Name	Yellow card	(yellow card) (yellow-red card)	Red card	Yellow card	(yellow card) (yellow-red card)	Red card	Yellow card	(yellow card) (yellow-red card)	Red card	Yellow card	(yellow card) (yellow-red card)	Red card	Yellow card	(yellow card) (yellow-red card)	Red card
1	23	(England)	LM	Colin Daniel	12	0	0	0	0	0	0	0	0	1	0	0	13	0	0
2	15	(Scotland)	CB	Tom Aldred	10	0	1	1	0	0	0	0	0	0	0	0	11	0	1
3	3	(England)	LB	Andy Taylor	6	0	0	0	0	0	0	0	0	0	0	0	6	0	0
3	5	(Scotland)	CB	Clark Robertson	6	0	0	0	0	0	0	0	0	0	0	0	6	0	0
3	21	(Nigeria)	RM	Bright Osayi-Samuel	4	0	0	1	0	0	0	0	0	1	0	0	6	0	0
6	7	(England)	CF	Kyle Vassell	4	0	0	1	0	0	0	0	0	0	0	0	5	0	0
6	8	(England)	CM	Brad Potts	3	0	0	1	0	0	1	0	0	0	0	0	5	0	0
6	28	(England)	CM	Jack Payne	4	0	1	0	0	0	0	0	0	0	0	0	4	0	1
9	1	(England)	GK	Sam Slocombe	4	0	0	0	0	0	0	0	0	0	0	0	4	0	0
9	2	(England)	RB	Kelvin Mellor	3	0	0	0	1	0	0	0	0	0	0	0	3	1	0
9	4	(Scotland)	CM	Jim McAlister	3	0	0	1	0	0	0	0	0	0	0	0	4	0	0
12	9	(England)	CF	Mark Cullen	2	0	0	0	0	0	0	0	0	1	0	0	3	0	0
12	12	(England)	CM	Jordan Flores	3	0	0	0	0	0	0	0	0	0	0	0	3	0	0
12	19	(Jamaica)	CF	Jamille Matt	3	0	0	0	0	0	0	0	0	0	0	0	3	0	0
12	~~22~~	(England)	LB	Danny Pugh	3	0	0	0	0	0	0	0	0	0	0	0	3	0	0
12	31	(Ivory Coast)	CF	Armand Gnanduillet	3	0	0	0	0	0	0	0	0	0	0	0	3	0	0
17	35	(Guyana)	CM	Neil Danns	2	0	0	0	0	0	0	0	0	0	0	0	2	0	0
17	37	(Scotland)	DM	Ian Black	2	0	0	0	0	0	0	0	0	0	0	0	2	0	0
19	18	(England)	RW	Danny Philliskirk	1	0	0	0	0	0	0	0	0	0	0	0	1	0	0
19	~~17~~	(Republic of Ireland)	RW	Mark Yeates	0	0	0	0	0	0	0	0	0	1	0	0	1	0	0
19	24	(England)	LB	Luke Higham	0	0	0	0	0	0	0	0	0	1	0	0	1	0	0
19	29	(England)	LW	Sanmi Odelusi	1	0	0	0	0	0	0	0	0	0	0	0	1	0	0
19	30	(England)	CF	Nathan Delfouneso	1	0	0	0	0	0	0	0	0	0	0	0	1	0	0
Total					80	0	2	5	1	0	1	0	0	5	0	0	90	1	2
