= Caines (surname) =

Caines is a surname. Notable people with the surname include:

- Cliff Caines, Canadian documentary filmmaker
- Crystal Caines, Guyanese–American rapper
- Daniel Caines (born 1979), English athlete
- Eleanor Caines (1870 or 1880–1913), American silent film actress
- Gavin Caines (born 1983), English footballer
- George Caines (1771–1825), the first official reporter of cases in the United States
- Helen Caines, American professor of physics
- Jeannette Caines (died 2004), American author of children's books
- John Caines (born 1933), English civil servant
- Justine Caines (1973–2022), Australian lobbyist and advocate
- Peter E. Caines (born 1945), Canadian engineer
- Wayne Caines, Bermudian politician

== See also ==
- Caine (surname)
