= William Cane =

William Cane may refer to:

- Bill Cane (1911–1987), Australian plantsman
- William H. Cane (1874–1956), American harness racing executive, owner, and promoter

== See also ==
- William Kane (disambiguation)
