= William Caine =

William Caine may refer to:

- William Caine (Hong Kong) (1799–1871), Colonial Secretary and acting Governor of Hong Kong
- William Sproston Caine (1842–1903), British politician and Temperance advocate
- William Caine (author) (1873–1925), British novelist
- L. William Caine, college football coach

== See also ==
- William Cain (disambiguation)
- William Kane (disambiguation)
- Caine (surname)
