= Henry Cameron (footballer) =

New Zealand footballer

Personal information
- Full name: Henry Anthony Cameron
- Date of birth: 28 June 1997 (age 29)
- Place of birth: Fulwood, England
- Height: 1.81 m (5 ft 11 in)
- Position: Midfielder

Team information
- Current team: Team Wellington

Youth career
- 2008–2015: Blackpool

Senior career*
| Years | Team | Apps | (Gls) |
| 2014–2017 | Blackpool | 25 | (1) |
| 2017 | → AFC Telford United (loan) | 3 | (0) |
| 2017–2018 | Limerick | 7 | (0) |
| 2018–2019 | Team Wellington | 13 | (1) |
| 2020– | Altona City SC | 0 | (0) |

International career^{‡}
| 2017 | New Zealand U20 | 2 | (0) |
| 2015– | New Zealand | 5 | (0) |
- * Club domestic league appearances and goals as of 09:25, 11 February 2019 (UTC) ‡ National team caps and goals as of 15:25, 20 November 2018 (UTC)

Henry Anthony Cameron (born 28 June 1997) is a New Zealand footballer who plays a midfielder for Team Wellington. He has also represented New Zealand at international level.

== Career ==
=== Blackpool ===
Cameron started his football career at Blackpool. He first joined them at 11 and began his first-year scholars in 2013. Cameron played regularly for the Blackpool youth team in his first year, helping them to win North-West Division Development League and to reach the Lancashire FA Professional Youth Cup (which they lost to Oldham Athletic).

Cameron signed an 18-month professional contract with Blackpool on 14 January 2015, something which Cameron describe it as a 'dream come true'. He made his debut for Blackpool's senior team on 31 January 2015, in a 1–0 home win against Brighton & Hove Albion. Cameron then scored his first goal for the club on 15 April 2015, in a match in which he also claimed an assist on a goal scored by Andrea Orlandi. During the match against Cardiff City on 25 April 2015, Cameron was at fault when he conceded a penalty after fouling Aron Gunnarsson in the box, allowing Eoin Doyle to convert. The 3–2 loss in this game resulted in Blackpool being relegated. Cameron later stated in the club's sessions on In The Spotlight that conceding the penalty was his most embarrassing moment in his football career to date. In his first season at the club, Cameron made eleven appearances, and at the end of the season he was awarded the Chris Muir Memorial Trophy, the club's award for its top youth player. In June 2015, Cameron signed a contract extension with the club, keeping him with Blackpool until 2017.

In the 2015–16 season, Cameron continued to be a first team regular, making several starts in the first half of the season. Cameron played a major role with assists for the winning goals against Scunthorpe United on 5 September 2015 and Swindon Town on 3 October 2015. An anterior cruciate ligament injury left him out for the whole 2015–16 season.

In January 2017, Cameron joined AFC Telford United in the National League North on a one-month loan deal, along with teammate Luke Higham. Cameron was subsequently released by Blackpool at the end of the 2016–17 season.

On 2 July 2017, Cameron signed for League of Ireland Premier Division side Limerick on an 18-month contract. He left the team at the end of his contract to sign for New Zealand Football Championship side Team Wellington.

== International career ==
Despite being born in Preston, England, it was reported in August 2015 that Anthony Hudson was looking to call Cameron up for the New Zealand national football team. This came after Cameron was discovered to be eligible to play for New Zealand through his mother. Cameron described being called up by New Zealand as a proud moment and an honour for his family and himself.

Cameron made his debut for the New Zealand national football team in a 0–1 victory over Oman on 13 November 2015. However, Cameron's debut suffered a setback when he sustained an anterior cruciate ligament injury, resulting him being carried off on a stretcher and being replaced by Alex Rufer. Cameron was sidelined for the whole 2015–16 season and required surgery as a result of his injury.

== Career statistics ==
=== Club ===
As of 27 April 2017

| Club | Season | League | | | FA Cup | | League Cup | | Other | | Total | |
| Club | Season | Division | Apps | Goals | Apps | Goals | Apps | Goals | Apps | Goals | Apps | Goals |
|---|---|---|---|---|---|---|---|---|---|---|---|---|
| Blackpool | 2014–15 | Championship | 11 | 1 | 0 | 0 | 0 | 0 | — | — | 11 | 1 |
| Blackpool | 2015–16 | League One | 14 | 0 | 0 | 0 | 1 | 0 | — | — | 15 | 0 |
| Blackpool | 2016–17 | League Two | 0 | 0 | 0 | 0 | 1 | 0 | 2 (Note: Appearances in EFL Trophy) | 0 | 3 | 0 |
| Blackpool | Total | | 25 | 1 | 0 | 0 | 2 | 0 | 2 | 0 | 29 | 1 |
| AFC Telford United (loan) | 2016–17 | National League North | 3 | 0 | 0 | 0 | 0 | 0 | — | — | 3 | 0 |
| Limerick | 2017 | League of Ireland Premier Division | 0 | 0 | 0 | 0 | 0 | 0 | — | — | 0 | 0 |
| Career total | | | 28 | 1 | 0 | 0 | 2 | 0 | 2 | 0 | 32 | 1 |

=== Country ===
New Zealand national team
| Year | Apps | Goals |
|---|---|---|
| 2015 | 1 | 0 |
| 2016 | 1 | 0 |
| Total | 2 | 0 |
