= William Cain =

William Cain may refer to:

- William Cain (American politician) (1792–1878), lieutenant governor of South Carolina
- William Cain (Australian politician) (1831–1914), mayor of Melbourne and Victorian parliamentarian
- William Cain (sea captain) (1862–1932), Manx master mariner
- Sir William Cain, 1st Baronet (1864–1924), English brewer and philanthropist
- William Cain (cricketer) (1899–1981), Australian cricketer
- William Cain (deemster) (1935–2021), Manx judge
- Bill Cain (athletic director) (fl. 1975–1980), American athletic director
- Bill Cain (basketball) (fl. 1970), player in Iowa State Cyclones men's basketball
- Bill Cain (fl. 1990s–2000s), American playwright

== See also ==
- Bill Cane (1911–1987), Australian plantsman
- Bill Kaine (1900–1968), English footballer
- William Caine (disambiguation)
- William Kane (disambiguation)
- Cain (disambiguation)
