= George Caines =

American lawyer (1771–1825)

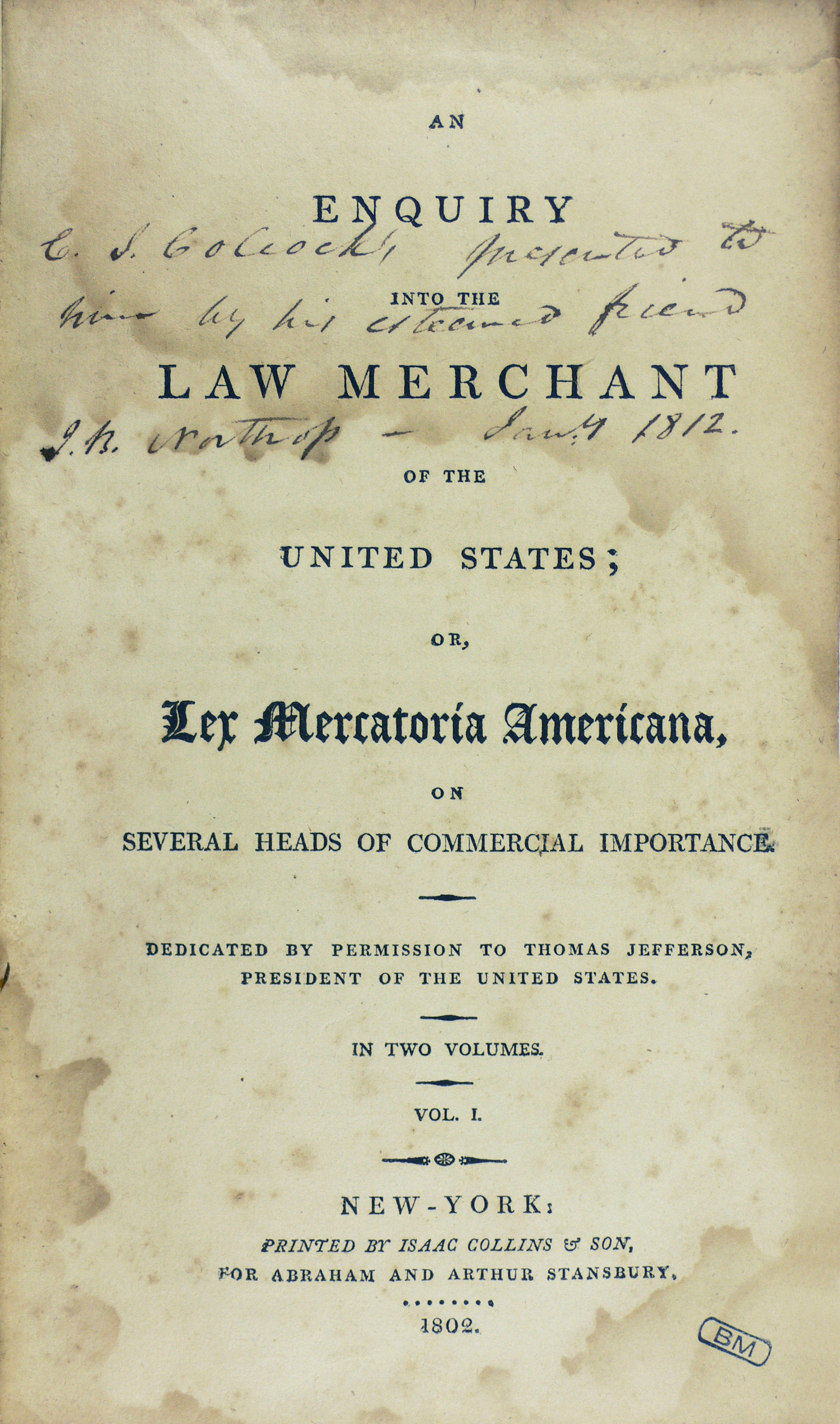
Lex mercatoria americana, 1802 (Milan, Mansutti Foundation).

George Caines (1771 – July 10, 1825) was the first official reporter of cases in the United States, appointed by the Court of Appeals of New York in accordance with legislation enacted by that state in April 1804. He occupied the office for one year, producing three volumes of the Reports, containing decisions from May 1803 to November 1805. Under the archaic abbreviation system once used for case citations, these reports are officially known as Caines' Reports, and are abbreviated as (vol) Cai. R. (page). Cases from other courts also reported by Caines are in volumes titled Caines' Cases, abbreviated as (vol) Cai. Cas. (page), while his edited versions of cases reported by William Coleman are titled Coleman & Caines' Cases, abbreviated as (vol) Cole. & Cai. Cas. (page).

Prior to becoming Reporter, Caines was a New York City lawyer, published the first volume of Lex Mercatoria Americana and prosecuted a noted libel case, People v. Croswell (3 Johns. Cas. 337 [1804]).

In 1819, Caines was among the founding members of the Missionary and Bible Society of the Methodist Episcopal Church. He died while en route home, in Catskill, New York, and is buried in the Thompson Street Cemetery there.

== See also ==
- Law report
