= Kyle Vassell =

Northern Irish footballer (born 1993)

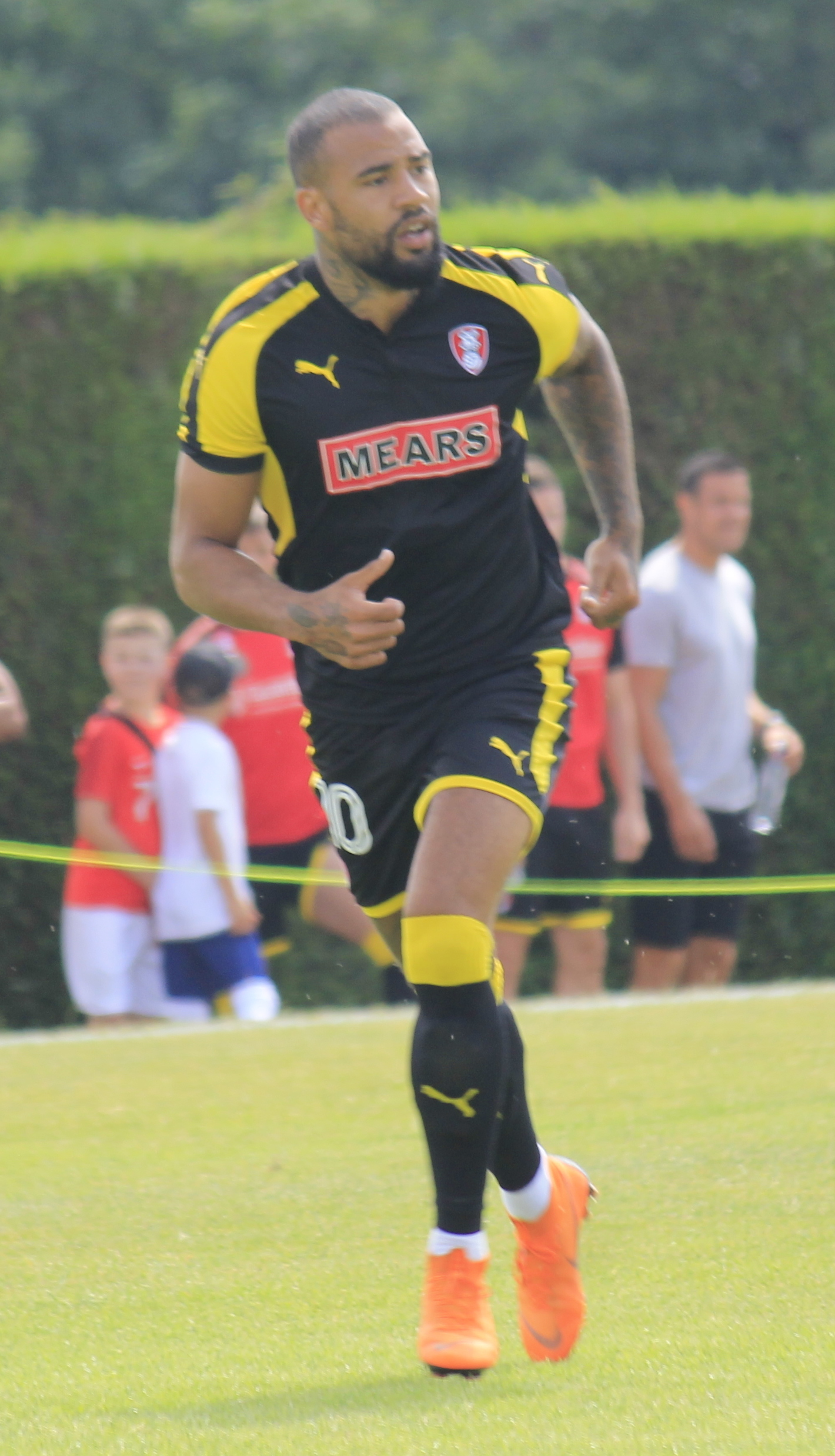
- Vassell playing for Rotherham United in 2018

Personal information
- Full name: Kyle Thomas Vassell
- Date of birth: 7 February 1993 (age 33)
- Place of birth: Milton Keynes, England
- Height: 6 ft 0 in (1.83 m)
- Position: Striker

Youth career
- –2007: Norwich City
- 2007–2010: Brentford

Senior career*
Years	Team	Apps	(Gls)
2010–2011	Brentford	0	(0)
2010	→ Woking (loan)	1	(0)
2011	→ St Albans City (loan)	2	(0)
2011	Dover Athletic	2	(0)
2011–2012	Sutton United	26	(4)
2011	→ Tooting & Mitcham United (dual-reg)	2	(0)
2011–2012	→ Whitehawk (dual-reg)	6	(2)
2012	→ Staines Town (loan)	7	(2)
2012–2013	Chelmsford City	23	(5)
2013	Bishop's Stortford	12	(6)
2013–2016	Peterborough United	28	(5)
2015	→ Oxford United (loan)	6	(1)
2015–2016	→ Dagenham & Redbridge (loan)	8	(0)
2016	→ Shrewsbury Town (loan)	13	(0)
2016–2018	Blackpool	63	(22)
2018–2021	Rotherham United	55	(4)
2021	→ Fleetwood Town (loan)	26	(4)
2021–2022	Cheltenham Town	16	(2)
2022	San Diego Loyal	29	(14)
2023–2025	Kilmarnock	72	(15)
2025–2026	Colorado Springs Switchbacks	9	(1)

International career^{‡}
2018	Northern Ireland	2	(0)
- * Club domestic league appearances and goals as of 20:25, 28 October 2025 (UTC) ‡ National team caps and goals as of 22:36, 15 October 2018 (UTC)

Kyle Thomas Vassell (born 7 February 1993) is a professional footballer who plays as a striker. Born in England, he represents the Northern Ireland national team.

He began his career as a youth at Norwich City and Brentford, before embarking on a nomadic period in non-League football. He made his Football League debut for Peterborough United in 2013 and thereafter notably played for Blackpool F.C. and Rotherham United. He is a distant relative of Darius and Isaac Vassell.

== Club career ==
=== Early years ===
Vassell began his career as a schoolboy at Norwich City and joined Brentford at age 15 after having difficulty with commuting from his London home to Norfolk. He later acknowledged that at the time he found the change of clubs difficult to comprehend. He failed to feature in the first team while at Brentford and spent work experience loan spells at Conference South sides Woking and St Albans City during the 2010–11 season. He was released by Brentford in June 2011 after he completed his two-year scholarship and later felt that he had given away his opportunity at being a professional footballer.

=== Dover Athletic ===
Following interest from Gillingham and Burton Albion and an unsuccessful trial with League Two side Crewe Alexandra, Vassell signed non-contract terms with Conference South side Dover Athletic in October 2011, linking up with former Brentford manager and player Nicky Forster. He scored on his debut against in a 6–3 Kent Senior Cup win over Maidstone United on 12 October. He made three further appearances before leaving the club.

=== Sutton United, dual-registrations and loan ===
Vassell signed non-contract terms with Conference South side Sutton United on 30 November 2011 and scored on his debut in a 1–0 Surrey Senior Cup win over Epsom & Ewell on 6 December. Vassell bagged four goals in a 6–0 Surrey Senior Cup win over Godalming Town on 17 January 2012. In December 2011 and January 2012, Vassell had dual-registration spells with Isthmian League Premier Division side Tooting & Mitcham United and Isthmian League Division One South side Whitehawk respectively. He signed for Conference South side Staines Town on loan on 21 March 2012. During the 2011–12 season, he made fifteen Sutton appearances, scored seven goals and helped the club into the Conference South playoffs, where they were knocked out in the semi-finals by Welling United. Vassell made 17 appearances and scored three goals for Sutton during the early months of the 2012–13 season before leaving the club in November 2012.

=== Chelmsford City ===
Vassell signed for Conference South side Chelmsford City on 6 December 2012. He scored his first goal for the club on his second appearance in a 2–1 league victory over Boreham Wood on 29 December. From early January 2013 to early February, he was in fine form and bagged five goals in five games. He helped secure a fifth-place finish for Chelmsford, but he suffered playoff heartbreak for the second season running as Chelmsford were beaten in the semi-finals by the eventual promoted team Salisbury City. He finished the season having made 25 appearances and scored seven goals, despite being utilised predominantly in a wide midfield role.

=== Bishop's Stortford ===
Vassell signed for Chelmsford City's neighbours and divisional rivals Bishop's Stortford on 30 June 2013. He scored a hattrick in his first competitive game for the club, a 6–1 Herts Charity Cup win over Ware on 1 August. Vassell scored his first league goal for Bishop's Stortford in a 2–2 draw with Boreham Wood on 19 August. Vassell bagged four goals in 17 minutes in a 5–0 FA Cup second qualifying round win over Hendon on 29 September, which saw him receive an FA Cup Player Of The Round nomination. Another hattrick followed for Vassell in the FA Cup third qualifying round in a 6–1 victory over Chipstead. Vassell's run of 16 goals in 16 games saw him hailed as "the new Dwight Gayle" (after Gayle secured a move to League One with Peterborough United and subsequently Premier League side Crystal Palace the previous year on the back of a prolific goalscoring spell for Bishop's Stortford), though Vassell dismissed the comparison. Vassell was the subject of national attention when Bishop's Stortford's FA Cup first round tie with League Two side Northampton Town was chosen to be screened by ITV. Vassell started the match on 10 November, but suffered a dead leg early in the second half and was substituted as Northampton ran out 2–1 winners. It was his last appearance for the club.

=== Peterborough United ===
After his goalscoring exploits for Bishop's Stortford led to interest from Football League clubs, Vassell signed a two-and-a-half-year deal with League One side Peterborough United for an undisclosed fee on 11 November 2013. Vassell made his Peterborough debut (his first appearance in the Football League) on 24 November, starting in a 1–0 home league defeat to Stevenage. He was replaced by Shaun Jeffers after 71 minutes. Vassell was an unused substitute for a 3–2 league defeat to former club Brentford on 26 November and his third Posh appearance came in the return fixture on 1 January 2014. He replaced Mark Little after 76 minutes of the 3–1 defeat. Vassell scored his first goal for the club in a 2–2 Football League Trophy Southern Area Final first leg draw at home to Swindon Town on 5 February.

Vassell later spent time on loan at Dagenham & Redbridge, before joining Shrewsbury Town on loan for the rest of the season in January 2016.

He was released by Peterborough at the end of his contract in May 2016.

=== Blackpool ===
On 16 June 2016 it was confirmed Vassell had signed a one-year contract to play for League Two side Blackpool. On 6 August 2016 he scored on his League debut for Blackpool, against Exeter City.

=== Rotherham United ===
In July 2018, Vassell signed a three-year deal with Championship side Rotherham United. His first league goal for the club came over a year later; an acrobatic strike against Peterborough United in the League One game on 29 December 2019. On 15 January 2021, Vassell joined League One side Fleetwood Town on loan for the remainder of the 2020–21 season. On 17 May 2021, Rotherham United published their retained list, and confirmed Vassell would be leaving the club at the end of his contract.

=== Cheltenham Town ===
On 9 August 2021, Vassell signed a one-year contract with League Two Champions, Cheltenham Town for their League One campaign. On 6 January 2022, Vassell left the club midway through his contract.

=== San Diego Loyal ===
Vassell moved overseas for the first time in his career on 17 January 2022, signing with USL Championship club San Diego Loyal SC. He was released by San Diego following the 2022 season.

=== Kilmarnock ===
Kyle Vassell signed for Kilmarnock on 1 January 2023 after leaving USL Championship club San Diego Loyal at the end of their 2022 season. He made an immediate impact, scoring his first goal for the club in a 1–0 victory over Dundee United in the fifth round of the Scottish Cup on 11 February 2023. Vassell continued his scoring form by netting in the quarter-final against Inverness Caledonian Thistle, although Kilmarnock were eliminated following a 2–1 defeat.

In the 2022–23 Scottish Premiership season, Vassell scored in key matches, including a 2–0 win over Livingston on 13 May 2023 and a 3–0 victory against Dundee United on 24 May 2023, where he scored twice. He concluded the season with six goals in 18 appearances across all competitions.

Ahead of the 2023–24 season, Vassell was appointed club captain. He played a pivotal role in Kilmarnock's successful campaign, scoring 11 goals in 41 appearances across all competitions. Notably, he scored twice in a 3–1 league victory over Livingston on 21 October 2023 and contributed goals in wins against Aberdeen and St Mirren. His performances helped Kilmarnock secure a fourth-place finish in the league, earning qualification for European competition. In the 2024–25 season, Vassell continued to be a key figure for Kilmarnock, making 28 appearances and scoring four goals across all competitions by April 2025. He scored in a European competition, netting in a 2–2 draw against Tromsø in the UEFA Conference League on 8 August 2024. However, in January 2025, Kyle Vassell suffered a shin injury during a Scottish Premiership match against St Mirren. After being substituted off, he was taken to hospital for further investigation amid concerns the injury could be serious.

== International career ==
In October 2018, Kyle Vassell was called up to the Northern Ireland squad for the first time, for their Nations League matches away to Austria and Bosnia and Herzegovina. Qualifying for Northern Ireland as his grandfather was from County Fermanagh, on his call up, Vassell said: "I'm over the moon, it has been a while coming, I'm grateful that my opportunity has come and it's my first ever call-up, so I'm really excited." On 12 October he made his debut against Austria, coming on as a substitute in the 77th minute.

== Career statistics ==
As of 2 January 2025.

Appearances and goals by club, season and competition
Club	Season	League			National Cup (Note: Including FA Cup and U.S. Open Cup)		League Cup		Other		Total	
Club	Season	Division	Apps	Goals	Apps	Goals	Apps	Goals	Apps	Goals	Apps	Goals
Brentford	2010–11	League One	0	0	0	0	0	0	0	0	0	0
Woking (loan)	2010–11	Conference South	1	0	0	0	—		0	0	1	0
St Albans City (loan)	2010–11	Conference South	2	0	0	0	—		0	0	2	0
Dover Athletic	2011–12	Conference South	2	0	1	0	—		1 (Note: Appearances in Kent Senior Cup)	1	4	1
Sutton United	2011–12	Conference South	11	2	0	0	—		4 (Note: Appearances in Surrey Senior Cup)	5	15	7
Sutton United	2012–13	Conference South	15	2	1	0	—		1 (Note: Appearances in FA Trophy)	1	17	3
Sutton United	Total		26	4	1	0	—		5	6	32	10
Tooting & Mitcham United (dual-reg)	2011–12	IL Premier Division	2	0	—		—		—		2	0
Whitehawk (dual-reg)	2011–12	IL Division One South	6	2	—		—		—		6	2
Staines Town (loan)	2011–12	Conference South	7	2	0	0	—		0	0	7	2
Chelmsford City	2012–13	Conference South	23	5	0	0	—		2 (Note: One appearance and one goal in Essex Senior Cup, one in Conference South play-offs)	1	25	6
Bishop's Stortford	2013–14	Conference South	12	6	4	7	—		0	0	16	13
Peterborough United	2013–14	League One	6	0	0	0	0	0	2 (Note: Appearances in Football League Trophy)	1	8	1
Peterborough United	2014–15	League One	17	5	2	0	1	0	1	0	21	5
Peterborough United	2015–16	League One	5	0	0	0	1	0	1	0	7	0
Peterborough United	Total		28	5	2	0	2	0	4	1	36	6
Oxford United (loan)	2014–15	League Two	6	1	0	0	0	0	0	0	6	1
Dagenham & Redbridge (loan)	2015–16	League Two	8	0	4	3	0	0	0	0	12	3
Shrewsbury Town (loan)	2015–16	League One	13	0	0	0	0	0	0	0	13	0
Blackpool	2016–17	League Two	34	11	4	0	0	0	4 (Note: Two appearances in the EFL Trophy and two in the League Two play-offs)	2	42	13
Blackpool	2017–18	League One	29	11	0	0	0	0	0	0	29	11
Blackpool	Total		63	22	4	0	0	0	4	2	71	24
Rotherham United	2018–19	Championship	23	0	0	0	2	0	—		25	0
Rotherham United	2019–20	League One	20	4	2	1	2	1	0	0	24	6
Rotherham United	2020–21	Championship	12	0	1	0	1	0	—		14	0
Rotherham United	Total		55	4	3	1	5	1	0	0	63	6
Fleetwood Town (loan)	2020–21	League One	26	4	—		—		0	0	26	4
Cheltenham Town	2021–22	League One	16	2	2	0	2	2	2 (Note: Appearances in EFL Trophy)	0	22	4
San Diego Loyal SC	2022	USL Championship	29	14	1	0	—		1	0	31	14
Kilmarnock	2022–23	Scottish Premiership	14	4	3	2	1	0	—		18	6
Kilmarnock	2023–24	Scottish Premiership	35	9	3	1	3	1	—		41	11
Kilmarnock	2024–25	Scottish Premiership	19	2	0	0	1	0	6 (Note: Two appearances in UEFA Europa League, four appearances and one goal in UEFA Conference League)	1	26	3
Kilmarnock	Total		68	15	6	3	5	1	6	1	85	20
Career total			393	86	28	14	14	4	25	12	460	116

== Honours ==
Blackpool

- EFL League Two play-offs: 2017
