= Sanmi Odelusi =

English footballer

Personal information
- Full name: Oluwasanmi Babafemi Oluwaseu Odelusi
- Date of birth: 11 June 1993 (age 33)
- Place of birth: Dagenham, England
- Height: 1.82 m (5 ft 11 1/2 in)
- Positions: Striker; winger

Youth career
- –2006: Queens Park Rangers
- 2006–2009: Reading
- 2009–2012: Bolton Wanderers

Senior career*
Years	Team	Apps	(Gls)
2012–2015	Bolton Wanderers	6	(0)
2014	→ Milton Keynes Dons (loan)	10	(0)
2014	→ Coventry City (loan)	14	(3)
2015–2017	Wigan Athletic	3	(0)
2016–2017	→ Rochdale (loan)	15	(0)
2017	→ Blackpool (loan)	7	(1)
2017	Colchester United	8	(1)
2018	Cheltenham Town	9	(1)
2018–2019	FC Halifax Town	16	(0)
2019	South Shields	2	(0)
2020	Romford	1	(0)
2020–2024	Hayes & Yeading United	115	(5)
Total		206	(11)
- * Club domestic league appearances and goals

Oluwasanmi Babafemi Oluwaseu Odelusi (born 11 June 1993) is an English former professional footballer who played as a winger.

He began his professional career in 2012 at Bolton Wanderers, where he made six appearances in the Championship. He also played in League One and League Two for seven other clubs, prior to dropping into non-league football in 2018.

== Club career ==
=== Bolton Wanderers ===
Growing up in Dagenham, England, Odelusi grew up playing football as a sport to enjoy. Odelusi joined Bolton Wanderers in 2009 after having also spent time in the Queens Park Rangers and Reading youth set-ups. It was at Bolton Wanderers when the club's Development Coach Jamie Fullarton helped Odelusi switch position from a striker to a winger.

He spent three years in the reserves but in the 2011–12 season Odelusi scored four goals in 16 league games and was rewarded with one-year deal in July 2012. Upon signing a new contract with the club, Odelusi was given number thirty-eight shirt for the club.

Odelusi was on the bench for the matches against Blackburn Rovers which Bolton won 1–0, the home match against Brighton & Hove Albion and the 1–0 loss against Ipswich Town before eventually making his debut in a 3–2 away loss against Charlton Athletic when he came on for Darren Pratley in the 82nd minute. Odelusi made his first start on 6 August against Shrewsbury Town in the League Cup and scored twice in a 3–1 win. Following his first team appearance, Odelusi signed a new contract with the club, keeping him until 2016. Odelusi made two more appearances later in the 2013–14 season, providing two assists in separate matches against Bournemouth and Reading.

==== Loan spells ====
On 21 February 2014, Odelusi joined League One side Milton Keynes Dons on a one-month loan. Odelusi made his MK Dons debut the next day, coming on as a substitute for Luke Chadwick in the 79th minute, in a 1–0 loss against Bradford City. On 24 March 2014, Odelusi extended his loan stay with the Dons until the end of the 2013–14 season. However, Odelusi suffered a knee injury that saw him ruled for the rest of the season before returning to his parent club, where he made ten appearances.

On 31 January 2015, Odelusi joined League One side Coventry City on a loan until the end of the season. On the same day, Odelusi made a strong impact on his debut when he scored from the edge of the area in a 2–2 draw against Rochdale. After being sidelined for weeks due to injury he sustained in training, Odelusi made his first team return, starting in a 1–0 loss against Barnsley on 3 March 2015. Odelusi scored his second Coventry City goal in the next game on 7 March 2015, in a 3–2 loss against Port Vale and scored again two weeks later on 14 March 2015, in a 3–2 win over Chesterfield. Odelusi returned to Bolton after making fourteen appearances and scoring three times for Coventry City.

=== Wigan Athletic ===
On 6 July 2015, Odelusi signed for Wigan Athletic on a three-year contract for an undisclosed fee. On 19 September 2015, Odelusi had a chance to score his first Latics goal against Fleetwood Town in a one-on-one attack, however his shot went out for a throw-in to the opposition. After making five appearances, three in the league, Odelusi was transfer-listed by Wigan on 22 September 2015.

He was injured in late 2015. Originally ruled out for the 2015/16 season, he returned to playing before the season ended.

On 25 July 2016, Odelusi joined Rochdale on a season long loan. He scored his first goal for Rochdale in an EFL Trophy tie against Notts County on 4 October 2016.

On 20 January 2017 he had his loan spell with Rochdale terminated after making just fifteen league appearances and parent club Wigan immediately loaned him out to Football League Two side Blackpool for the remainder of the season.

=== Colchester United ===
On 31 August 2017, Odelusi signed for Colchester United until January 2018. He made his Colchester debut on 2 September as a substitute in their 1–0 defeat at Cambridge United. He made his full debut on 3 October in Colchester's 1–0 home defeat by Gillingham in the EFL Trophy. He was replaced by Craig Slater after 78-minutes of the match. He scored his first goal for Colchester on 25 November during a 2–1 defeat at Notts County. He was told his contract would not be renewed when it expired on 31 December 2017 and was allowed to attend a trial at Cheltenham Town.

=== Later career ===
Odelusi signed a contract with Chelthenham Town on 5 January 2018. He left at its conclusion in June, and signed a one-year deal for National League club FC Halifax Town.

He signed for South Shields on 1 October 2019, initially until January 2020. On 31 December 2019, he announced his retirement from football to pursue a career as a coach. Shortly afterwards he signed for Romford as a player, then for Hayes and Yeading United in February 2020, where he made over 100 appearances and became a consistent starting player over five seasons for the first time in his career.

== Sexual crimes and conviction ==
In March 2025, Odelusi was found guilty of raping a sleeping woman in London in November 2021. He was sentenced to seven years in prison.

== Career statistics ==
Appearances and goals by club, season and competition
Club	Season	League			FA Cup		League Cup		Other		Total	
Club	Season	Division	Apps	Goals	Apps	Goals	Apps	Goals	Apps	Goals	Apps	Goals
Bolton Wanderers	2012–13	Championship	1	0	0	0	0	0	—		1	0
Bolton Wanderers	2013–14	Championship	5	0	1	0	2	2	—		8	2
Bolton Wanderers	2014–15	Championship	0	0	0	0	0	0	—		0	0
Bolton Wanderers	Total		6	0	1	0	2	2	—		9	2
Milton Keynes Dons (loan)	2013–14	League One	10	0	—		—		0	0	10	0
Coventry City (loan)	2014–15	League One	14	3	0	0	0	0	0	0	14	3
Wigan Athletic	2015–16	League One	3	0	0	0	1	0	1 (Note: Appearance in Football League Trophy)	0	5	0
Wigan Athletic	2016–17	Championship	0	0	—		—		—		0	0
Wigan Athletic	Total		3	0	0	0	1	0	1	0	5	0
Rochdale (loan)	2016–17	League One	15	0	—		1	0	3 (Note: Appearances in EFL Trophy)	1	19	1
Blackpool (loan)	2016–17	League Two	7	1	1	0	—		0	0	8	1
Colchester United	2017–18	League Two	9	1	0	0	0	0	2	0	11	1
Cheltenham Town	2017–18	League Two	9	1	0	0	0	0	0	0	9	1
FC Halifax Town	2018–19	National League	14	0	2	0	—		0	0	16	0
FC Halifax Town	2019–20	National League	2	0	0	0	—		0	0	2	0
FC Halifax Town	Total		16	0	2	0	0	0	0	0	18	0
Career total			89	6	4	0	3	2	6	1	103	9
