= Armand Gnanduillet =

Ivorian football player (born 1992)

Personal information
- Full name: Armand Erwan Djihounou Gnanduillet
- Date of birth: 13 February 1992 (age 34)
- Place of birth: Angers, France
- Height: 6 ft 4 in (1.93 m)
- Position: Forward

Team information
- Current team: Caen
- Number: 11

Senior career*
Years	Team	Apps	(Gls)
2010–2012	Le Havre II	25	(2)
2012	Poissy	11	(5)
2013–2016	Chesterfield	82	(10)
2014	→ Tranmere Rovers (loan)	4	(2)
2015	→ Oxford United (loan)	4	(0)
2015–2016	→ Stevenage (loan)	14	(5)
2016	Leyton Orient	18	(4)
2016–2018	Blackpool	45	(7)
2018	Baroka	0	(0)
2018–2020	Blackpool	73	(25)
2020–2021	Altay	15	(2)
2021–2022	Heart of Midlothian	27	(6)
2022–2023	Le Mans	49	(21)
2023–2024	Dunkerque	15	(3)
2024–2025	Sochaux	16	(3)
2025–	Caen	30	(5)

International career
- Ivory Coast U20
- * Club domestic league appearances and goals as of 23 June 2026

Armand Erwan Djihounou Gnanduillet (born 13 February 1992) is a professional footballer who plays as a forward for Ligue 3 club Caen. Born in France, he has represented the Ivory Coast at youth level.

Both of his parents originate from Ivory Coast. He started playing football at CS Lanrelas in Brittany, later joining Le Havre and Poissy, and was an Ivory Coast under-20 international. He was named in the Ivory Coast squad for the 2011 CAF African Under-23 Championships.

== Early life ==
Gnanduillet was born in Angers, France, to Ivorian parents. He acquired French nationality on 6 September 2000, through the collective effect of his parents' naturalization.

== Club career ==
=== France ===
His first steps on a football field were made at the CS Lanrelas in Brittany. Gnanduillet then joined Le Havre, where he failed to break into the first team but played 24 times for the reserves, scoring three goals. He moved from Le Havre to AS Poissy in 2012, where he went on to score five times in 11 games.

=== Chesterfield ===
Gnanduillet joined Chesterfield on 21 January 2013. He was handed a contract until the end of the season by Chesterfield boss Paul Cook after a trial.

He scored 39 minutes into his first competitive appearance for a Chesterfield XI against Belper Town in the Derbyshire Senior Cup. He then went on to score on his third league appearance for the Spireites, coming on as a half-time substitute for Mark Randall against AFC Wimbledon. Gnanduillet stroked a Danny Whitaker cross into the top corner to score his first goal in English football having played just 20 minutes' game time in League Two. He was handed his first start for the first team on 2 March 2013, at Dagenham & Redbridge.

Gnanduillet was given a two-year contract extension at the end of the 2012–13 season by Paul Cook. He scored the winning goal in the 96th minute of a 2–1 win against Southend United, converting Gary Roberts' corner with a powerful header, ending Southend's unbeaten start to the season. During a Skybet League 2 match against Burton Albion, Gnanduillet became dazed after a head collision with a Burton defender. However, he then went on to claim Chesterfield's Man of the Match award. He later went on to score the first of Chesterfield's two goals against York City after converting a penalty won by Gary Roberts. On 30 August 2014, following a match at Port Vale, it was reported that Gnanduillet had suffered alleged racist abuse after reacting to something shouted at him by a Port Vale fan as the teams left the pitch. Chesterfield, Port Vale and Staffordshire Police launched an investigation into the incident.

On 20 October 2014, Gnanduillet joined League Two side Tranmere Rovers on a one-month loan, and in March 2015 he signed on loan for Oxford United until the end of the season. He made four substitute appearances for Oxford before being recalled early by his parent club.

=== Leyton Orient ===
On 22 January 2016, Gnanduillet joined Leyton Orient for an undisclosed fee.

=== Blackpool ===
On 19 August 2016, Gnanduillet joined Blackpool on a two-year contract. After two years, he joined South African side Baroka before returning to Blackpool two months later. He was the club's top goalscorer, with fourteen in all competitions, in 2018–19. He was released in June 2020.

=== Altay ===
On 12 August 2020, Gnanduillet signed for Turkish second division side Altay on a one-year deal. On 29 December 2020, after just 4 months at the club, Gnanduillet left Atlay by mutual consent. He had scored 2 goals in 15 appearances during his short spell at the Turkish club.

=== Heart of Midlothian ===
Gnanduillet joined Scottish Championship club Heart of Midlothian on an 18-month deal on 25 January 2021. He scored twice on his debut away to Raith Rovers after coming on as a 60th minute substitute. His first season in Scotland ended in success as Hearts won promotion back to the Scottish Premiership.

=== Le Mans ===
On 21 January 2022, Gnanduillet left Hearts after 12 months and signed a permanent deal with Championnat National club Le Mans.

=== Sochaux ===
On 10 July 2024, Gnanduillet signed a two-year contract with Sochaux.

== International career ==
Gnanduillet has previously represented Ivory Coast at under-20 international level.

== Career statistics ==
As of match played 12 December 2021

Appearances and goals by club, season and competition
Club	Season	League			Domestic Cup		League Cup		Other		Total	
Club	Season	Division	Apps	Goals	Apps	Goals	Apps	Goals	Apps	Goals	Apps	Goals
Le Havre II	2010–11	CFA	6	0	—		—		—		6	0
Le Havre II	2011–12	CFA	19	2	—		—		—		19	2
Le Havre II	Total		25	2	—		—		—		25	2
Poissy	2012–13	CFA	11	5	—		—		—		11	5
Chesterfield	2012–13	League Two	13	3	—		—		—		13	3
Chesterfield	2013–14	League Two	34	5	2	0	1	0	2 (Note: Appearances in Football League Trophy)	1	39	6
Chesterfield	2014–15	League One	26	2	5	1	1	0	3 (Note: One appearance in Football League Trophy and two in League One play-offs)	1	35	3
Chesterfield	2015–16	League One	9	0	—		1	0	1	0	11	0
Chesterfield	Total		82	10	7	1	3	0	6	1	98	11
Tranmere Rovers (loan)	2014–15	League Two	4	2	—		—		—		4	2
Oxford United (loan)	2014–15	League Two	4	0	—		—		—		4	0
Stevenage (loan)	2015–16	League Two	14	5	2	1	—		—		16	6
Leyton Orient	2015–16	League Two	17	4	—		—		—		17	4
Leyton Orient	2016–17	League Two	1	0	—		—		—		1	0
Leyton Orient	Total		18	4	—		—		—		18	4
Blackpool	2016–17	League Two	19	3	1	0	1	0	5 (Note: Four appearances in EFL Trophy and one in League Two play-offs)	3	26	6
Blackpool	2017–18	League One	26	4	1	0	1	1	3 (Note: Appearances in EFL Trophy)	0	31	5
Blackpool	2018–19	League One	43	10	3	1	3	2	3	1	52	14
Blackpool	2019–20	League One	30	15	3	2	1	1	2	0	36	18
Blackpool	Total		118	32	8	3	6	4	13	4	145	43
Altay	2020–21	TFF First League	15	2	—		—		—		15	2
Heart of Midlothian	2020–21	Scottish Championship	13	5	—		—		—		13	5
Heart of Midlothian	2021–22	Scottish Premiership	14	1	—		2	0	—		16	1
Heart of Midlothian	Total		27	6	—		2	0	—		29	6
Le Mans	2021–22	Championnat National	16	6	—		—		—		0	0
Career total			318	68	17	5	11	4	19	5	365	82

== Honours ==
Chesterfield

- Football League Two: 2013–14
- Football League Trophy runner-up: 2013–14

Blackpool

- EFL League Two play-offs: 2017

Heart of Midlothian

- Scottish Championship: 2020–21

Individual

- PFA Team of the Year: 2019–20 League One
