= Caine (surname) =

Caine is a surname of several different origins. In many cases it is a variation of the surname Cain.

When the surname is of French origin, in some cases it is derived from a derogatory nickname for someone with a bad temper - from the French caigne "bitch".

Notable people with the surname include:

- Alice Brown Caine (1849–1918), English temperance leader, wife of William Sproston Caine.
- Dan Caine, American general
- Hall Caine, British novelist and playwright
- Hugh Le Caine, Canadian physicist, composer and instrument builder
- Jeffrey Caine, British writer and actor
- Jonathan Caine, Baron Caine, political aide
- Marti Caine, (1945–1995), English comedian and singer
- Martin Caine, American college football head coach
- Michael Caine, British film actor
- Natalie Caine (1909–2008), also known by her married name Natalie James, English oboist
- Rachel Caine (1962–2020), pen name of Roxanne Longstreet Conrad, an American writer of science fiction stories
- Rebecca Caine, Canadian opera singer
- Shakira Caine, Guyanese model, married to Michael Caine
- Stanley Caine (1936–2013), English actor
- Trudi Le Caine (née Janowski), an arts patron, wife of Hugh Le Caine
- William Caine 1873–1925), British author, son of William Sproston Caine.
- William Caine, Governor-general of Hong Kong 1854–1859
- William Sproston Caine (1842–1903), British politician and Temperance advocate

== In fiction ==
- Kwai Chang Caine, main character on the television series Kung Fu
- Alastair Caine, a demon on the television series Charmed
- Virgil Caine, protagonist of The Band song The Night They Drove Old Dixie Down
- Horatio Caine, director of the Miami Dade Crime Lab, police lieutenant and explosives expert on the television series CSI: Miami

== See also ==
- Cain (disambiguation)
- Caines (surname)
- Kaine (surname)
