= Judge Cain =

Judge Cain may refer to:

- James D. Cain Jr. (born 1964), judge of the United States District Court for the Western District of Louisiana
- Timothy M. Cain (born 1961), judge of the United States District Court for the District of South Carolina
