= Senator Cain =

Senator Cain may refer to:

- Emily Cain (born 1980), Maine State Senate
- Harry P. Cain (1906–1979), U.S. Senator from Washington from 1946 to 1953
- William Cain (American politician) (1792–1878), South Carolina State Senate

== See also ==
- John Thomas Caine (1829–1911), Utah State Senate
