= William Kane =

William Kane may refer to:

- William Francis de Vismes Kane (1840–1918), English entomologist
- William R. Kane (1911–1957), United States Navy captain and World War II flying ace.
- Will Kane, a fictional character
- Billy Kane, a video game character

== See also ==
- William Kane Reilly, administrator of the Environmental Protection Agency
- William Cane (disambiguation)
- William Cain (disambiguation)
- William Caine (disambiguation)
- Kane (surname)
