= Michael Cain (footballer) =

English footballer (born 1994)

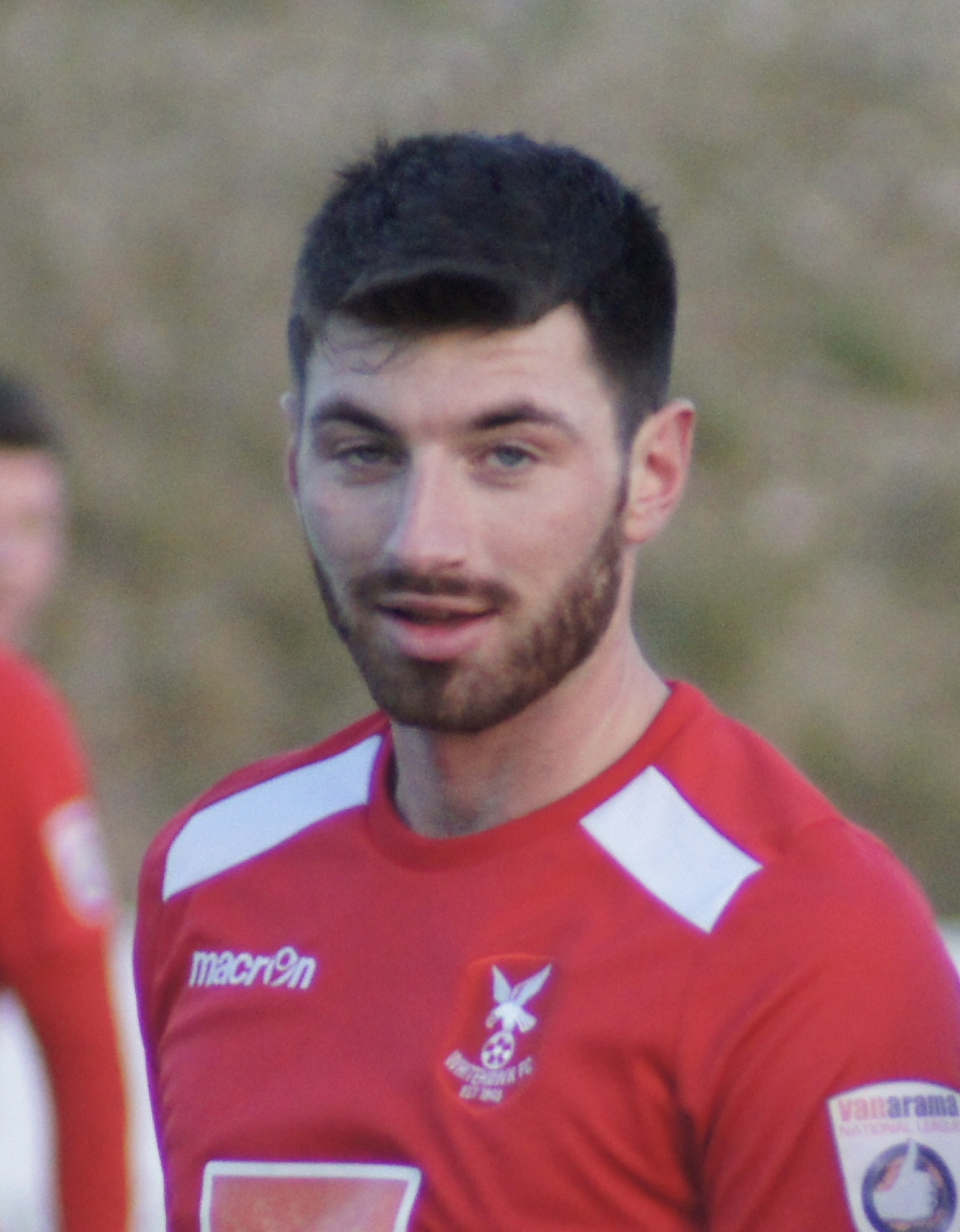
- Michael Cain playing for Whitehawk in 2017

Personal information
- Full name: Michael Dean Cain
- Date of birth: 4 December 1994 (age 31)
- Place of birth: Luton, England
- Position: Midfielder

Youth career
- Luton Town
- 2011–2013: Leicester City

Senior career*
Years	Team	Apps	(Gls)
2013–2017	Leicester City	0	(0)
2014	→ Mansfield Town (loan)	2	(0)
2014–2015	→ Walsall (loan)	32	(2)
2016–2017	→ Blackpool (loan)	6	(1)
2017–2018	Whitehawk	12	(0)
2018	Hemel Hempstead Town	12	(0)
2018–2019	Hitchin Town	20	
2019	Bankhai United	13	(4)
2020	Bishop Auckland	1	(0)
2020	Blyth Spartans	7	(0)
- * Club domestic league appearances and goals as of 11:10, 10 December 2020 (UTC)

Michael Dean Cain (born 4 December 1994) is an English footballer who most recently played as a midfielder for Blyth Spartans.

== Career ==
=== Leicester City ===
Cain started his career playing for Luton Town in their youth academy system after having a successful junior career with AFC Dunstable. He was signed by Leicester City at the age of 16 for a potential "six figure sum". Where he joined Leicester City's development system, primarily playing for the under-18 and under-21 teams.

==== Mansfield Town (loan) ====
On 21 February 2014, Cain joined League Two side Mansfield Town on an initial one-month loan deal. Cain made his debut for Mansfield as a second-half substitute, replacing Chris Clements in the 67th minute of their 1–4 defeat to Bury.

==== Return to Leicester ====
On 26 August 2014, Cain made his Leicester City debut, along with fellow academy graduates, Ryan Watson and James Pearson, in the 0–1 defeat to Shrewsbury Town in the League Cup.

==== Walsall (loan) ====
On 20 October 2014, Cain joined League One side Walsall on a one-month loan. Cain made his debut in the 1–0 defeat away to Crawley Town on 21 October. On 17 November 2014, the loan was extended for a further month. Cain scored his first goal on 9 December 2014, in the 80th minute of the Football League Trophy fixture against Tranmere Rovers, to make it 2–2, sending the game to penalties, Walsall eventually winning 5–4. After making twelve appearances in all competitions for the Saddlers, Cain's loan spell was extended by a month on 22 December 2014. On 10 January 2015, Cain scored the first league goal of his professional career, in the 1–4 defeat to Scunthorpe United. He scored his second league goal the following weekend in a 2–0 win over Colchester on 17 January 2015. Cain's loan spell was extended until the end of the season on 20 January 2015. Cain was released from Leicester City in 2017.

=== Whitehawk ===
Cain signed for Whitehawk on 15 September 2017, making his debut the following day in the FA Cup 2nd Qualifying Round against Oxford City. In January 2018 Cain joined Hemel Hempstead Town.

After a spell playing in Thailand for Bankhai United, Cain returned to England featuring for Blyth Spartans in pre-season but later signing for Bishop Auckland. After one appearance, he returned to Blyth Spartans, signing a three-month deal.

== Career statistics ==
As of match played 26 January 2018

Appearances and goals by club, season and competition
Club	Season	League			FA Cup		League Cup		Other		Total	
Club	Season	Division	Apps	Goals	Apps	Goals	Apps	Goals	Apps	Goals	Apps	Goals
Leicester City	2013–14	Championship	0	0	0	0	0	0	0	0	0	0
Leicester City	2014–15	Premier League	0	0	0	0	1	0	0	0	1	0
Leicester City	Total		0	0	0	0	1	0	0	0	1	0
Mansfield Town (loan)	2013–14	League Two	2	0	0	0	0	0	0	0	2	0
Walsall (loan)	2014–15	League One	32	2	2	0	0	0	4 (Note: Appearances in Football League Trophy)	1	38	3
Blackpool (loan)	2016–17	League Two	6	1	1	0	2	0	5 (Note: Appearances in the EFL Trophy)	0	14	1
Whitehawk	2017–18	National League South	12	0	1	0	—		5 (Note: Appearances in FA Trophy and Sussex Senior Cup)	1	18	1
Career total			52	3	4	0	4	0	14	2	74	4

== Honours ==
Walsall

- Football League Trophy runner-up: 2014–15
