= Bill Cain (athletic director) =

American sports administrator (1933–2022)

William Earl Cain (September 30, 1933 – June 8, 2022) was an American sports administrator who was the athletic director of the East Carolina Pirates from 1975 to 1980.

A native of Rockingham, North Carolina, Cain played football at East Carolina as an offensive and defensive end from 1957 to 1959. He was co-captain of the 1959 team, earning All-Carolina's conference honors. He earned his bachelor's and master's degrees. Prior to serving his as athletic director, he was the freshman football coach (1968–70) and the golf and tennis coach (1972–75). He died on June 8, 2022.
