= Luke Higham =

English footballer

Personal information
- Full name: Luke Higham
- Date of birth: 21 October 1996 (age 30)
- Place of birth: Blackpool, England
- Position: Left-back

Team information
- Current team: Bamber Bridge

Youth career
- 2005–2015: Blackpool

Senior career*
Years	Team	Apps	(Gls)
2015–2017	Blackpool	11	(0)
2016	→ Nuneaton Town (loan)	4	(0)
2017	→ Telford United (loan)	11	(0)
2017–	Fleetwood Town	0	(0)
2018	→ FC United of Manchester (loan)	3	(0)
2018–2020	Moreland City		
2020	Lancaster City		
2020–	Bamber Bridge		
2021	Marine (loan)	3	(1)
- * Club domestic league appearances and goals as of 21:16 21 December 2021 (UTC)

Luke Higham (born 21 October 1996) is an English professional footballer who plays as a left-back for Bamber Bridge.

== Playing career ==
Higham, a former Blackpool season ticket holder, signed his first professional contract at Blackpool in May 2015 after ten years association with the club. He made his first team debut for the "Seasiders" on 6 October, in a 2–1 Football League Trophy victory over Port Vale at Vale Park. He was released by Blackpool in May 2017, along with nine of his teammates. In February 2018, Higham was loaned to FC United of Manchester.
