= 2019–20 Blackpool F.C. season =

English football club season

Blackpool
2019–20 season
- Owner and chairman: Simon Sadler
- Manager: Terry McPhillips (until 5 July); Simon Grayson (6 July – 12 February); David Dunn (caretaker; 12 February – 2 March); Neil Critchley (head coach; from 2 March)
- Stadium: Bloomfield Road
- League One: 13th
- FA Cup: Third round
- EFL Cup: First round
- EFL Trophy: Second round
- Top goalscorer: League: Armand Gnanduillet (15); All: Armand Gnanduillet (18)
Home colours	Away colours

The 2019–20 Blackpool F.C. season was the club's 111th season in the English Football League and their third-consecutive season in League One, the third tier of the Football League. The season covered the period from 1 July 2019 to 30 June 2020. Blackpool finished a curtailed season in 13th place.

Along with competing in League One, the club were also participants in three cup competitions. They were knocked out of the FA Cup in the third round by Reading, after a replay; they were eliminated from the EFL Cup in the first round by Macclesfield Town; and they were knocked out of the EFL Trophy in the second round by Scunthorpe United.

Terry McPhillips resigned as manager on 5 July after one season in charge. He was succeeded by Simon Grayson, who returned to the club after leaving them for Leeds United in 2008. Grayson was sacked on 12 February after a string of defeats. Neil Critchley was appointed as his successor on 2 March.

== Pre-season ==
Eight players were released at the end of the 2018–19 campaign: defender Donervon Daniels; midfielders John O'Sullivan, Finlay Sinclair-Smith and Chris Taylor; and forwards Max Clayton, Mark Cullen and Chris Long. Forward Scott Quigley joined Barrow on a free transfer.

Simon Sadler was announced as Blackpool's new owner on 13 June, ending a 32-year reign of the Oyston family.

Prior to Terry McPhillips' departure on 5 July, Blackpool agreed moves for five players, all from free agency. The first arrival was 27-year-old former Solihull Moors striker Adi Yussuf. (Yussuf returned to Solihull on loan in September without making an appearance for Blackpool.) Central defender Ryan Edwards, 25, left Plymouth Argyle at the end of the 2018–19 season after turning down a new contract. Irish midfielder, 28-year-old Jamie Devitt, put pen to paper after rejecting a contract renewal from Carlisle United. (Devitt was loaned out to Gary Bowyer's Bradford City on 23 August.) Fellow midfielder Ben Tollitt joined the following day. The 24-year-old had been released by Tranmere Rovers. (Tollitt was loaned out to Wrexham on 23 August.) Into July, 23-year-old former Crystal Palace midfielder Sullay Kaikai terminated his contract with NAC Breda to move to Bloomfield Road.

Simon Grayson's first bit of business was bringing in 22-year-old Scottish striker Ryan Hardie from Rangers for an undisclosed fee. The following week, Hardie was joined by his former Rangers teammate, goalkeeper Jak Alnwick, on a year-long loan. That meant Blackpool had five goalkeepers in their squad, until Myles Boney departed on loan to South Shields on 25 July. Left-back James Husband joined on loan from Norwich City on 26 July, again on a year-long term.

Left-back Marc Bola left to join Middlesbrough on 28 July for an undisclosed fee, but returned on-loan in January until the end of the season. He was Blackpool's Player of the Year for 2018–19.

Two days before the season kick-off, Belgian centre-back Rocky Bushiri joined on loan from Nottingham Forest. Striker Joe Nuttall also signed, for an undisclosed fee, from Blackburn.

On the eve of the campaign, Blackpool had a squad of 28 players. The depth in positions: four goalkeepers, seven defenders, nine midfielders and eight forwards.

=== Results ===
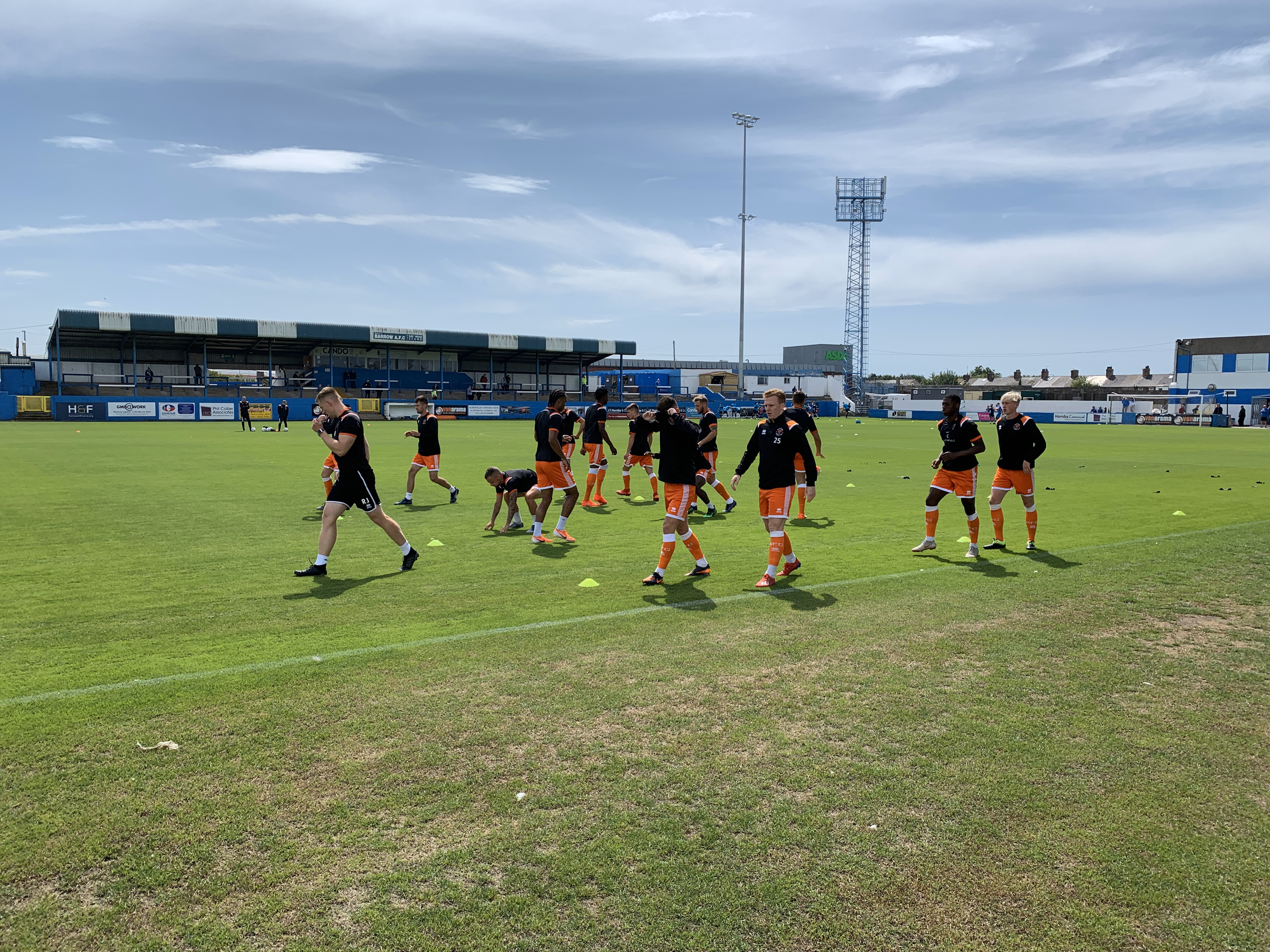
Blackpool players warming up before their friendly at Barrow on 20 July

Longridge Town hosting Blackpool at their Mike Riding Ground in a pre-season friendly on 28 July

Blackpool's opening pre-season friendly was at Dundee on 9 July. The hosts won the game by a single goal.

A week later, Blackpool faced local side AFC Fylde at Mill Farm. They won 2–0, with goals from Nathan Delfouneso and a debut strike from Adi Yussuf.

On 20 July, a split squad travelled to both Altrincham and Barrow. The Altrincham side lost 2–1 (Ben Tollitt netting for the visitors), while the Barrow side won 3–0, with strikes from Nathan Delfouneso, Armand Gnanduillet and an own-goal from Connor Brown. Former Seasider Ian Evatt, now manager of the hosts, came on as a late substitute to officially end his playing career, against the manager who brought him to Bloomfield Road in 2006.

Blackpool's first home friendly was against Blackburn Rovers on 27 July. They lost 2–0 to the Championship side. Jak Alnwick was given a starting debut, while James Husband came on as a substitute just after the hour mark.

Their final friendly before the season officially kicked off was at Longridge Town on 28 July. Goals from Callum Guy, Yusifu Ceesay, Harry Pritchard and Adi Yussuf helped the Seasiders to a 4–2 win.

On 6 August, three days after their opening 2−0 League One win at home to Bristol Rovers, Blackpool played a hastily arranged friendly against Fleetwood Town at Town's Poolfoot Farm training facility in Thornton-Cleveleys. The match finished 1–1, with Michael Nottingham scoring Blackpool's equalising goal.

==== In detail ====
9 July 2019 Friendly	Dundee	1–0	Blackpool	Dundee, Scotland
19:45 BST	Nelson 41'	Report		Stadium: Kilmac Stadium at Dens Park

16 July 2019 Friendly	AFC Fylde	0–2	Blackpool	Medlar-with-Wesham
19:45 BST		Report	Delfouneso 58'; Yussuf 71'	Stadium: Mill Farm

20 July 2019 Friendly	Altrincham	2–1	Blackpool	Altrincham
15:00 BST	Walters 35'; Chadwick 40' (pen.)	Report	Tollitt 23'	Stadium: J. Davidson Stadium

20 July 2019 Friendly	Barrow	0–3	Blackpool	Barrow-in-Furness
15:00 BST		Report	Delfouneso 8'; Gnanduillet 51'; Brown 88' (o.g.)	Stadium: Furness Building Society Stadium

27 July 2019 Friendly	Blackpool	0–2	Blackburn Rovers	Blackpool
15:00 BST		Report	Armstrong 3'; Brereton 78'	Stadium: Bloomfield Road

28 July 2019 Friendly	Longridge Town	2–4	Blackpool	Longridge
14:00 BST	Ince; Ince	Report	Guy; Ceesay; Pritchard; Yussuf	Stadium: Mike Riding Ground

6 August 2019 Friendly	Fleetwood Town	1–1	Blackpool	Thornton-Cleveleys
14:00 BST	Wallace 71'	Report	Nottingham	Stadium: Poolfoot Farm

== Season proper ==
On 20 June 2019, the EFL League One fixtures were revealed.

=== August ===
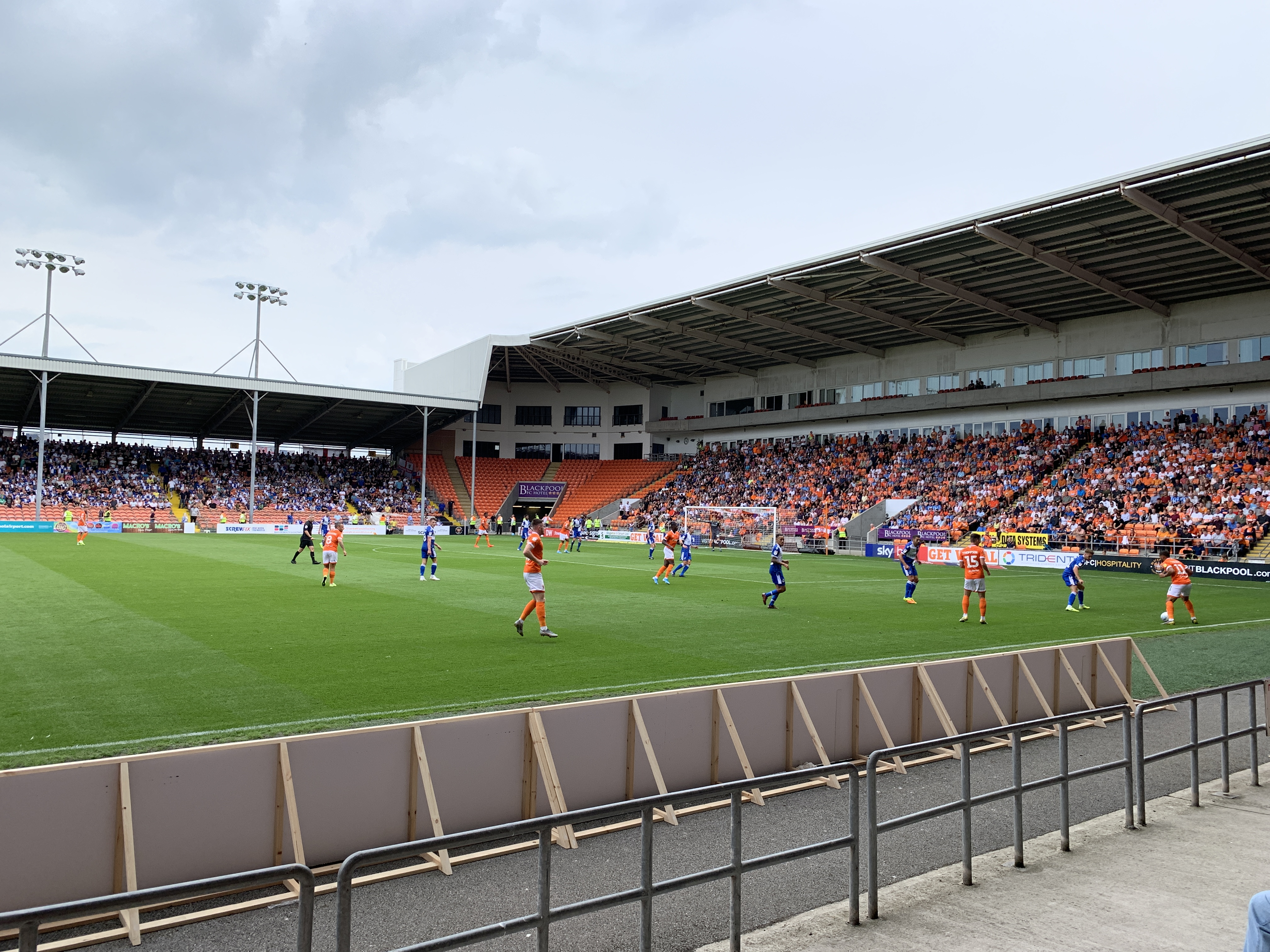
Blackpool hosting Bristol Rovers at Bloomfield Road on the opening day of the EFL League One season

Blackpool opened their League campaign at home to Bristol Rovers on 3 August, and gave a starting debut to four players: Jak Alnwick, James Husband, Ryan Edwards and Sullay Kaikai. A crowd of over 11,000 watched Jay Spearing put the hosts ahead from the penalty spot in the 28th minute after Rovers' goalkeeper Anssi Jaakkola caught Curtis Tilt with the follow-through of a punch to clear the ball. Armand Gnanduillet doubled the lead a minute after the break with a diving header from Spearing's cross. The result put the Tangerines second in the table, behind local rivals Fleetwood Town.

A week later, Blackpool travelled to the south coast to face Southend. Simon Grayson retained the same lineup that started against Bristol Rovers. An own-goal from the hosts' Harry Lennon gave the Seasiders the lead after nine minutes. Three minutes later, Nathan Delfouneso opened his scoring account for the campaign with a strike. He scored his second on 37 minutes, giving Blackpool a 3–0 lead at the break. James Husband was given a straight red card for a reckless challenge on Elvis Bwomono. Simon Cox pulled one back for Southend with fifteen minutes to go. Blackpool moved to the top of the table on goal-difference with the victory.

On 13 August, Blackpool began their EFL Cup campaign with a home fixture against Macclesfield Town. Ollie Turton put Blackpool ahead just after the half-hour mark. The visitors levelled on 39 minutes via a Rocky Bushiri own-goal. Macclesfield went ahead midway into the second half through Virgil Gomis. Armand Gnanduillet equalised from the penalty spot in the 90th minute. The match went to a penalty shootout, which Macclesfield won 4–2.

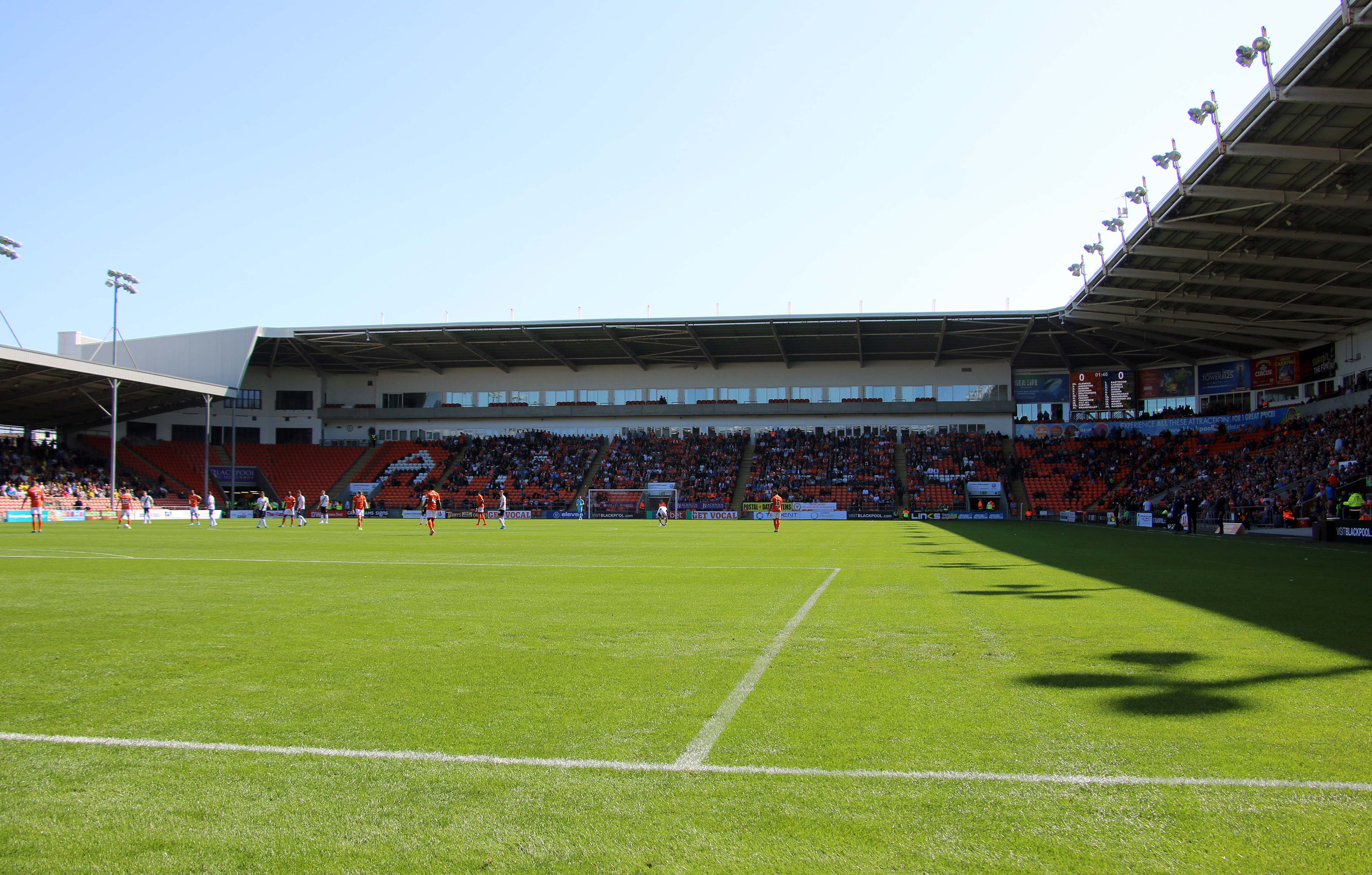
Blackpool hosting Oxford United on 17 August

Back to League business, Oxford United visited Bloomfield Road on 17 August. The hosts were without Jay Spearing, who injured his shoulder in midweek, and the suspended James Husband. Ollie Turton deputised as captain in Spearing's absence. Ryan Edwards opened the scoring with a header on five minutes. Armand Gnanduillet doubled the lead from the penalty spot two minutes into first-half injury time after he was felled. Josh Ruffels pulled one back for the visitors two minutes later. The hosts held on for the victory, despite Oxford having 69% of the possession and 23 shots. Blackpool dropped to second in the table after Lincoln City, the only other team with a 100% record, won 4–0 at home to Southend.

Blackpool made a midweek trip to Gilligham on 20 August. After going two goals down inside 37 minutes to a brace from Alex Jakubiak, Sullay Kaikai scored his first goal for the Tangerines to put them back in the game. Armand Gnanduillet scored his fourth goal of the campaign in first-half injury time to level matters. The match finished 2–2, and Blackpool returned to the top of the table after Lincoln City lost at MK Dons.

On 23 August, two players departed on loan — Jamie Devitt to Bradford City and Ben Tollitt to Wrexham — while Ben Heneghan returned to the club on loan until January.

The following day, Blackpool made the trip to Spotland Stadium to face Rochdale. The match finished goalless. Blackpool dropped to second place after Ipswich Town won 5–0 at Bolton.

On 27 August, Simon Grayson made his third permanent signing of the season when left-back Calum Macdonald joined from Derby County on a free transfer. On 30 August, the eve of Blackpool's home match against Portsmouth, Sean Scannell joined in a permanent deal from Bradford City. Harry Pritchard went in the opposite direction. Meanwhile, midfielder Yusifu Ceesay joined Altrincham on loan until January.

Portsmouth took the lead in said match, Marcus Harness finding the net after 17 minutes. Armand Gnanduillet scored his fifth goal of the season just before the hour mark to maintain the hosts' unbeaten campaign. Blackpool dropped to third position in the table.

=== September ===
Blackpool made a winning start to their EFL Trophy campaign on 3 September with a 5–1 scoreline against Morecambe at Bloomfield Road. Ben Heneghan opened the scoring after four minutes. Kevin Ellison levelled for the visitors midway through the first half, before Michael Nottingham restored the home side's lead one minute into first-half injury time. Ryan Hardie scored his first goal for Blackpool six minutes after the break to make it 3–1. Substitute Sullay Kaikai made it 4–1 on 89 minutes. Joe Nuttall also opened his account for Blackpool with a goal one minute into injury time.

Back to League duty on 7 September, Blackpool made the trip to Birmingham's St Andrew's stadium to face a homeless Coventry City. Sullay Kaikai opened the scoring inside the first minute. He repeated the feat after 38 minutes, but Coventry levelled matters before the break, with goals from Matt Godden on 41 minutes and, five minutes later, Wesley Jobello. Callum O'Hare, on loan from Aston Villa scored what proved to be the winner one minute into injury time. Blackpool had played the last eight minutes with ten men after substitute Nathan Delfouneso went off with hamstring tightness on 87 minutes. The result ended Blackpool's unbeaten start to the League season, while also extending Coventry's. Blackpool dropped to sixth place, three points behind new leaders Wycombe Wanderers.

A second-consecutive defeat occurred on 14 September at home to MK Dons. Russell Martin scored the visitors' first goal on five minutes. A mistake by Curtis Tilt let Jordan Houghton through, who made it 2–0 just after the hour mark. David Kasumu made it 3–0 with fifteen minutes remaining. Blackpool dropped to ninth place in the table.

A midweek away trip to Doncaster Rovers on 17 September resulted in a single-goal victory for Blackpool. Armand Gnanduillet, in the third minute of injury time, headed his sixth goal in all competitions. Blackpool's three points saw them climb four places to fifth in the table.

A short trip to Accrington Stanley on 21 September ended with a 1–1 draw. A Curtis Tilt own goal on 16 minutes was cancelled-out in injury time by Matty Virtue. Blackpool dropped one place to sixth.

Six days later, Blackpool hosted Lincoln City, under the managership for the first time of the Tangerines' former manager Michael Appleton. Sean Scannell, in his first start for Blackpool, scored his first goal for the club on eleven minutes. Jordan Thompson doubled the lead ten minutes later. Jack Payne halved the Imps' deficit on 24 minutes. Blackpool climbed to fourth place with their victory.

=== October ===
Into October, Blackpool travelled to the University of Bolton Stadium to face Bolton Wanderers for a Monday night game. The match ended goalless. Blackpool had climbed one place to fifth after Saturday's results; this point moved them back up to fourth.

On 12 October, Rotherham United were the visitors to Bloomfield Road. Michael Smith put Rotherham ahead on 51 minutes. Former Blackpool player Clark Robertson made it two with three minutes of normal time remaining. Armand Gnanduillet pulled one back from the penalty spot nine minutes into added time. Blackpool fell to sixth place with the defeat. Blackpool received five bookings during the match, bringing their tally to eleven in the last three games.

The following Tuesday saw a trip north to face Carlisle United in their second group-stage match. United keeper Louis Gray let the ball rebound into the net through his legs to give the Tangerines a 25th-minute lead. Carlisle levelled two minutes into first-half injury time through Ryan Loft. They went ahead for the first time three minutes from the end of normal time via Canice Carroll. Blackpool dropped to second in the group, behind Wolverhampton Wanderers U21s, with the defeat.

Wycombe Wanderers were the visitors to Bloomfield Road on 22 October. Scott Kashket put Wycombe in the lead in the eighth minute. Ben Heneghan equalised for Simon Grayson's men on 68 minutes. Those were the only goals of the game, and Blackpool dropped to eighth place in the table.

On 26 October, Blackpool visited Nigel Clough's Burton Albion. The match finished goalless, despite Curtis Tilt being sent off for two yellow cards just short of the hour mark. Blackpool, who had slipped to their lowest placing of the campaign thus far, climbed one place to ninth.

=== November ===
On 2 November, Blackpool welcomed Peterborough United to the seaside. Blackpool were without Curtis Tilt, who was serving a suspension for his dismissal in the previous match. Mohamed Eisa opened the scoring for the visitors on 13 minutes. A Niall Mason own-goal brought the hosts level just before the half-hour mark. Armand Gnanduillet put Blackpool ahead for the first time on 41 minutes, but four minutes later Ivan Toney restored parity. Two minutes into the second half, Gnanduillet scored from the penalty spot, his ninth goal in all competitions this campaign, to put Blackpool ahead again. Marcus Maddison made it 3–3 with nineteen minutes remaining, but another Peterborough own-goal, this time from Dan Butler, proved to be the winning goal on 74 minutes. Blackpool climbed one place to eighth with the victory.

Blackpool progressed to the second round of the EFL Trophy after a single-goal win at home to Wolverhampton Wanderers U21s on 5 November. Rocky Bushiri scored his first goal for the club three minutes into stoppage time. Mark Howard made his first appearance for Blackpool since March, having overcome an Achilles tendon injury.

Morecambe made the 40-mile trip to Bloomfield Road for an FA Cup first-round meeting on 9 November. Nathan Delfouneso put the Seasiders ahead just inside ten minutes. Armand Gnanduillet doubled their lead on 24 minutes, bringing his tally for the season to ten. Matty Virtue scored his second goal of the season just before half-time to make it 3–0. The Shrimps' Cole Stockton pulled one back two minutes in first-half stoppage time. Sullay Kaikai made it 4–1 with six minutes remaining.

Prior to kick-off in the League One fixture against AFC Wimbledon at Bloomfield Road on 16 November, a minute's applause honoured the memories of Cyril Robinson and Les Campbell, who both died during the week. Robinson had been the last surviving member of Blackpool's 1953 FA Cup winning team. To mark that, another minute's applause occurred for him on 53 minutes. In the match, a double from Armand Gnanduillet gave Blackpool the three points, and their fourth consecutive win in all competitions. Gnanduillet had now scored twelve goals in all competitions. Blackpool climbed three places to fifth in the table.

On 23 November, the Seasiders made the trip to Suffolk to take on then-league-leaders Ipswich Town. Mark Howard was not included in the 18 named players for the match. Gwion Edwards put the Tractor Boys ahead on eight minutes. Joe Nuttall, replacing the injured Armand Gnadnuillet, levelled proceedings on 22 minutes. Eight minutes into the second half, Jay Spearing put the visitors ahead for the first time from the spot. Another penalty, scored by Luke Garbutt, brought the hosts level. Blackpool, whose unbeaten run was extended to seven games, dropped three places to eighth in the table. The attendance was 19,503, around 500 of which was travelling support.

Four days later, Scunthorpe United knocked Blackpool out of the EFL Trophy at the second-round stage when they won 3–1 at Bloomfield Road. Simon Grayson made eight changes from the side that had faced Ipswich. Kevin van Veen put the Iron ahead on 12 minutes. Abobaker Eisa made it two thirteen minutes later. Joe Nuttall pulled one back on 70 minutes, with his second goal in as many games, but the visitors scored a third in stoppage time, Eisa getting his second. Callum Guy was sent off for a second bookable offence on 73 minutes.

=== December ===
Blackpool progressed to the third round of the FA Cup on 1 December with a 3–1 victory over Maidstone United at Bloomfield Road. Saidou Khan put the visitors ahead just before the half-hour mark. A George Elokobi own goal brought Blackpool level two minutes into the second half. Nathan Delfouneso then scored twice in as many minutes to seal the win for Blackpool. 16-year-old Tony Weston made his professional debut for the Seasiders as a substitute one minute before the end of normal time.

On 7 December, Fleetwood Town made the eight-mile journey south for the Fylde Coast derby. Liam Feeney put Blackpool ahead on 11 minutes with not only his first goal for the club but his first in two years. A Sullay Kaikai free-kick doubled their lead two minutes into the second half. Armand Gnanduillet scored his 13th goal of the season on 65 minutes. Substitute Conor McAleny pulled one back for the Fishermen with ten minutes of normal time remaining. Blackpool climbed to fourth in the table with the three points.

Seven days later, Blackpool travelled to Sunderland. Matty Virtue put the Tangerines in the lead on four minutes. Charlie Wyke equalised for Phil Parkinson's men on 37 minutes. Blackpool dropped one place to fifth with the draw.

On 21 December, Blackpool hosted Shrewsbury Town. Fejiri Okenabirhie's penalty on 56 minutes separated the sides. Blackpool dropped two places to seventh with the defeat.

A Boxing Day fixture against Accrington Stanley at Bloomfield Road ended with the visitors taking home the three points after Sean McConville scored the only goal of the game one minute into stoppage time. Jack Sims made his first-team debut for the Seasiders after coming on as a first-half substitute for the injured Jak Alnwick. A second-consecutive home loss, Blackpool dropped to tenth, their lowest placing of the season thus far.

Tranmere Rovers, managed by former Blackpool midfielder Micky Mellon, welcomed the Tangerines on 29 December. Mark Howard made his first league appearance for the club in nine months, having recovered from injury. Ben Heneghan put the visitors ahead on ten minutes. Morgan Ferrier equalised just before half time. Blackpool remained tenth with the point.

=== January ===
On New Year's Day, Blackpool travelled to Rotherham United. They lost 2–1, with Armand Gnanduillet netting their goal. Their third defeat in four league games, Blackpool remained in tenth place. The club had made two new signings in the previous few days: midfielder Grant Ward, who was unattached after leaving Ipswich Town, and defender Jordan Thorniley, from Sheffield Wednesday for an undisclosed fee.

On 4 January, Blackpool faced Reading at the Madejski Stadium in the third round of the FA Cup. Nathan Delfouneso put Blackpool ahead just before the half-hour. Sam Baldock equalised for the Royals eleven minutes into the second half. Armand Gnanduillet put the visitors ahead again four minutes later, only for Danny Loader to restore parity. Gnanduillet had the chance to put Blackpool ahead again, but his chipped penalty hit the crossbar.

Ryan Hardie joined Plymouth Argyle on loan on 9 January.

Reading won the FA Cup third-round replay 2–0 at Bloomfield Road on 14 January. After being omitted from Reading's squad in the original fixture, Charlie Adam came on as an injury-time substitute to face his former club for the first time since leaving in 2011. It was the hosts' fourth defeat in six matches.

Blackpool made several transfers the following week. Forward Gary Madine, a free agent after being released by Cardiff City earlier in the month, returned to the club on a permanent basis. He was there on loan in 2015. Also incoming, midfielder Connor Ronan joined on loan from Wolves. Left-back Nick Anderton joined Carlisle United, while midfielder Jordan Thompson signed for Stoke City, both for undisclosed fees. Forward Rowan Roache was released. Going out on loan were goalkeeper Christoffer Mafoumbi to Morecambe, forward Adi Yussuf to Boreham Wood and defender Michael Nottingham to Crewe Alexandra. Ben Heneghan's loan from Sheffield United, meanwhile, was extended until the end of the season.

On 18 January, Blackpool returned to league duty with a visit to Lincoln City. They lost by a single goal, dropping to 15th place in the table.

On 24 January, goalkeeper Chris Maxwell joined on a free transfer, having had his contract with Preston North End cancelled by mutual consent.

The following day, James Husband made his move from Norwich City a permanent one.

On 28 January, Blackpool travelled to Wycombe Wanderers. They went two down inside the first ten minutes. New loan signing Kiernan Dewsbury-Hall scored on his debut to pull one back late on.

The month was closed out with several incomings and outgoings in the transfer market. Arriving at Bloomfield Road were right-back Teddy Howe (from Reading) and midfielder Ben Garrity (from Warrington Town) on permanent contracts, while centre-back Taylor Moore joined on loan from Bristol City until the end of the season. Out went Ben Tollitt (released), Callum Guy (to Carlisle United) and Curtis Tilt (to Rotherham United).

=== February ===
On 1 February, Blackpool faced Oxford United at the Kassam Stadium, their fifth-consecutive away league match. Gary Madine put the Tangerines ahead on ten minutes, but a double from Marcus Browne before the end of the first half gave the hosts the three points.

Seven days later, Blackpool procured their first victory in ten matches, 2–1 at home to Sol Campbell's Southend United. Armand Gnanduillet scored both for the hosts, bringing his tally for the season to 17 goals in all competitions.

On 11 February, Gillingham made the long midweek trip to Bloomfield Road, where they were 3–2 victors. Armand Gnanduillet put Blackpool ahead on seven minutes, a lead they held for over an hour, until John Akinde levelled matters in the 73rd minute. Regan Charles-Cook put the visitors ahead three minutes later, before substitute Nathan Delfouneso restored parity one minute into stoppage time. Four minutes later, however, Brandon Hanlan scored the winner. Blackpool had now lost eight of their last eleven matches. Simon Grayson was sacked the following day, and David Dunn was put in temporary charge.

Bristol Rovers hosted Blackpool on 15 February. Gary Madine put the Tangerines in front on two minutes. Two minutes before the break, Ben Heneghan was given a straight red card. Alfie Kilgour brought Rovers level on 73 minutes, before Josh Ginnelly scored the winner for the hosts six minutes from the end of normal time. Their eighth defeat in ten league games, Blackpool dropped to 16th place, their lowest placing of the season thus far.

On 22 February, Blackpool returned from a trip to AFC Wimbledon with a point after a goalless draw.

Three days later, the Tangerines hosted Bolton Wanderers. Connor Ronan scored his first goal for Blackpool on 13 minutes. Kean Bryan equalised for the visitor on 88 minutes, but Kiernan Dewsbury-Hall netted his second goal for the club in the final minute of normal time. Blackpool climbed two places to 14th with the victory.

Blackpool, unchanged for the third straight match, closed out February with a second-consecutive victory, against Ipswich Town at Bloomfield Road, and again the winner came in the final minutes. Kiernan Dewsbury-Hall scored his third goal for the club on 26 minutes. Freddie Sears levelled for the visitors nine minutes into the second half. Substitute Joe Nuttall scored his second League goal of the campaign three minutes into added time; his first came in the reverse fixture at Portman Road. Blackpool climbed one place to 13th with the three points.

=== March ===
On 2 March, Blackpool appointed Neil Critchley as Simon Grayson's full-time replacement, in a head coach capacity – a first for the club. He left his role as Liverpool's under-23s manager to move to Bloomfield Road.

Critchley's first match in charge was the Fylde Coast derby, at Fleetwood on 7 March, which finished goalless.

Three days later, Blackpool hosted Tranmere Rovers. Micky Mellon's team were 2–0 up at half-time. Kiernan Dewsbury-Hall, with his fourth goal for the club, pulled one back in the second half. Blackpool remained in thirteenth place in the table.

On 13 March, in response to the COVID-19 pandemic, the EFL suspended all competitions until at least 3 April. Three Blackpool fixtures were affected: Sunderland (H; 14 March), Shrewsbury (A; 21 March) and Peterborough (A; 29 March). The home fixture against Burton on 4 April would be the first fixture they could play. On 9 June, clubs voted to curtail the season, meaning the final table would be calculated by a points-per-game method with the play-offs being played as normal. Blackpool finished in thirteenth position.

=== EFL League One ===
==== League table ====
Pos	Team	Pld	W	D	L	GF	GA	GD	Pts	PPG
9	Doncaster Rovers	34	15	9	10	51	33	+18	54	1.59
10	Gillingham	35	12	15	8	42	34	+8	51	1.46
11	Ipswich Town	36	14	10	12	46	36	+10	52	1.44
12	Burton Albion	35	12	12	11	50	50	0	48	1.37
13	Blackpool	35	11	12	12	44	43	+1	45	1.29
14	Bristol Rovers	35	12	9	14	38	49	−11	45	1.29
15	Shrewsbury Town	34	10	11	13	31	42	−11	41	1.21
16	Lincoln City	35	12	6	17	44	46	−2	42	1.20
17	Accrington Stanley	35	10	10	15	47	53	−6	40	1.14

Source: EFL Official Website
Rules for classification: 1) Points per game; 2) Goal difference; 3) Number of goals scored; 4) Head-to-head results; 5) Wins; 6) Away goals; 7) Penalty points (sec 9.5); 8) 12-point sending-off offences

==== Results ====
===== In summary =====
Overall								Home						Away					
Pld	W	D	L	GF	GA	GD	Pts	W	D	L	GF	GA	GD	W	D	L	GF	GA	GD
35	11	12	12	44	43	+1	45	9	2	6	27	23	+4	2	10	6	17	20	−3

Last updated: 10 March 2020.

===== By matchday =====
Matchday	1	2	3	4	5	6	7	8	9	10	11	12	13	14	15	16	17	18	19	20	21	22	23	24	25	26	27	28	29	30	31	32	33	34	35
Home/Away	H	A	H	A	A	H	A	H	A	A	H	A	H	H	A	H	H	A	H	A	H	H	A	A	A	A	A	H	H	A	A	H	H	A	H
Result	W	W	W	D	D	D	L	L	W	D	W	D	L	D	D	W	W	D	W	D	L	L	D	L	L	L	L	W	L	L	D	W	W	D	L
Position	2	1	2	1	2	3	6	9	5	6	4	4	6	8	9	8	5	8	4	5	7	10	10	10	15	15	15	14	15	16	16	14	13	13	13

Updated to match(es) played on 10 March 2020. Source: 11v11
A = Away; H = Home; W = Win; D = Draw; L = Loss

===== In detail =====
3 August 2019 1	Blackpool	2–0	Bristol Rovers	Blackpool
15:00 BST	Spearing 28' (pen.); Gnanduillet 46'; Turton (yellow card) 65'	Report	Smith (yellow card) 72'	Stadium: Bloomfield Road; Attendance: 11,359; Referee: Seb Stockbridge

10 August 2019 2	Southend United	1–3	Blackpool	Southend-on-Sea
15:00 BST	Ralph (yellow card) 8'; Cox 75'	Report	Lennon (o.g.) 9'; Delfouneso 12', 37'; Husband (red card) 60'; Gnanduillet (yellow card) 82'	Stadium: Roots Hall; Attendance: 6,823 (480 away); Referee: Kevin Johnson

17 August 2019 3	Blackpool	2–1	Oxford United	Blackpool
15:00 BST	Edwards 5'; Gnanduillet 45+2'; Thompson (yellow card) 60'; Alnwick (yellow card) 62'; Tilt (yellow card) 89'	Report	Rodriguez (yellow card) 43'; Mousinho (yellow card) 45+1'; Ruffels 45+4'; Hall (yellow card) 82'; Moore (yellow card) 90+5'	Stadium: Bloomfield Road; Attendance: 9,104; Referee: Darren Drysdale

20 August 2019 4	Gillingham	2–2	Blackpool	Gillingham
19:45 BST	Jakubiak 9', 37'	Report	Kaikai 41'; Gnanduillet 45+3'; Bushiri (yellow card) 59'	Stadium: Priestfield Stadium; Attendance: 4,390; Referee: Neil Hair

24 August 2019 5	Rochdale	0–0	Blackpool	Spotland
15:00 BST	O'Connell (yellow card) 86'	Report	Nuttall (yellow card) 62'	Stadium: Crown Oil Arena; Attendance: 4,664 (2,014 away); Referee: Carl Boyeson

31 August 2019 6	Blackpool	1–1	Portsmouth	Blackpool
15:00 BST	Edwards (yellow card) 34'; Gnanduillet 58'; Spearing (yellow card) 73'	Report	Harness 17'; McCrorie (yellow card) 22'; Haunstrup (yellow card) 76'	Stadium: Bloomfield Road; Attendance: 10,605; Referee: Chris Sarginson

7 September 2019 7	Coventry City	3–2	Blackpool	Bordesley
15:00 BST	Godden 41'; Jobello 45+1'; Dabo (yellow card) 57'; O'Hare 90+1'	Report	Kaikai 2', 38'; Delfouneso (yellow card) 80'	Stadium: St Andrew's Trillion Trophy Stadium; Attendance: 6,637; Referee: Paul Marsden

14 September 2019 8	Blackpool	0–3	Milton Keynes Dons	Blackpool
15:00 BST		Report	Martin 5'; Houghton 62'; Kasumu 75'; Nombe (yellow card) 78'	Stadium: Bloomfield Road; Attendance: 8,283; Referee: Andy Haines

17 September 2019 9	Doncaster Rovers	0–1	Blackpool	Doncaster
19:45 BST		Report	Thompson (yellow card) 75'; Gnanduillet 90+3'	Stadium: The Keepmoat Stadium; Attendance: 6,964; Referee: Anthony Coggins

21 September 2019 10	Accrington Stanley	1–1	Blackpool	Accrington
15:00 BST	Tilt (o.g.) 16'; Opoku (yellow card) 21'; Finley (yellow card) 63'; Sykes (yellow card) 80'	Report	Turton (yellow card) 74'; Virtue 90+2'; Nuttall (yellow card) 90+6'	Stadium: Wham Stadium; Attendance: 4,054; Referee: John Brooks

27 September 2019 11	Blackpool	2–1	Lincoln City	Blackpool
19:45 BST	Scannell 11'; Thompson 21'; Heneghan (yellow card) 45'; Turton (yellow card) 65'; Tilt (yellow card) 79'; Spearing (yellow card) 81'; Macdonald (yellow card) 84'	Report	Payne 24'; Connolly (yellow card) 89'	Stadium: Bloomfield Road; Attendance: 9,203; Referee: Oliver Yates

7 October 2019 12	Bolton Wanderers	0–0	Blackpool	Horwich
20:00 BST	Verlinden (yellow card) 44'	Report	Heneghan (yellow card) 45'	Stadium: University of Bolton Stadium; Attendance: 14,003 (2,164 away); Referee: John Busby

12 October 2019 13	Blackpool	1–2	Rotherham United	Blackpool
15:00 BST	Scannell (yellow card) 10'; Feeney (yellow card) 49'; Guy (yellow card) 85'; Heneghan (yellow card) 90+5'; Virtue (yellow card) 90+8'; Gnanduillet 90+9' (pen.)	Report	Smith 51'; Olosunde (yellow card) 58'; Robertson 87'; Ogbene (yellow card) 90+1'; Clarke (yellow card) 90+8'; Iversen (yellow card) 90+9'	Stadium: Bloomfield Road; Attendance: 9,932; Referee: Christopher Pollard

22 October 2019 14	Blackpool	1–1	Wycombe Wanderers	Blackpool
19:45 BST	Heneghan 51', (yellow card) 66'; Husband (yellow card) 68'	Report	Kashket 8'; Jacobson (yellow card) 90'	Stadium: Bloomfield Road; Attendance: 7,298; Referee: Ben Toner

26 October 2019 15	Burton Albion	0–0	Blackpool	Burton upon Trent
15:00 BST		Report	Tilt (yellow card) 3' (yellow-red card) 57'	Stadium: Pirelli Stadium; Attendance: 3,012; Referee: Carl Boyeson

2 November 2019 16	Blackpool	4–3	Peterborough United	Blackpool
15:00 BST	Mason (o.g.) 27'; Spearing (yellow card) 37'; Gnanduillet 41', 47' (pen.); Butler (o.g.) 74'	Report	Eisa 13'; Dan Butler (yellow card) 21'; Toney 45'; Maddison 71' (pen.)	Stadium: Bloomfield Road; Attendance: 7,619; Referee: James Oldham

16 November 2019 17	Blackpool	2–0	AFC Wimbledon	Blackpool
15:00 GMT	Gnanduillet 51', 81'	Report	O'Neill (yellow card) 28'; Pigott (yellow card) 41'	Stadium: Bloomfield Road; Attendance: 7,588; Referee: Andy Haines

23 November 2019 18	Ipswich Town	2–2	Blackpool	Ipswich
15:00 GMT	Edwards 8'; Garbutt 58' (pen.)	Report	Nuttall 22'; Spearing 53' (pen.), (yellow card) 90'; Edwards (yellow card) 69'	Stadium: Portman Road; Attendance: 19,503 (498 away); Referee: Steve Martin

7 December 2019 19	Blackpool	3–1	Fleetwood Town	Blackpool
15:00 GMT	Feeney 11'; Heneghan (yellow card) 15'; Kaikai 47'; Edwards (yellow card) 59'; Gnanduillet 65', (yellow card) 83'; Husband (yellow card) 90+9'	Report	Dempsey (yellow card) 13'; Sowerby (yellow card) 40'; McAleny 80'	Stadium: Bloomfield Road; Attendance: 10,355; Referee: Antony Coggins

14 December 2019 20	Sunderland	1–1	Blackpool	Sunderland
15:00 GMT	Wyke 37'; Dobson (yellow card) 45+3' (yellow-red card) 74'; Flanagan (yellow card) 59'	Report	Virtue 4'; Gnanduillet (yellow card) 45+3'; Tilt (yellow card) 82'	Stadium: Stadium of Light; Attendance: 30,595; Referee: Ollie Yates

21 December 2019 21	Blackpool	0–1	Shrewsbury Town	Blackpool
15:00 GMT	Virtue (yellow card) 60'; Spearing (yellow card) 66'	Report	Landell (yellow card) 20'; Love (yellow card) 54'; Okenabirhie 56' (pen.); Golbourne (yellow card) 85'	Stadium: Bloomfield Road; Attendance: 7,695; Referee: Seb Stockbridge

26 December 2019 22	Blackpool	0–1	Accrington Stanley	Blackpool
15:00 GMT	Thompson (yellow card) 13'; Spearing (yellow card) 80'	Report	Finley (yellow card) 13'; Barclay (yellow card) 50'; McConville 90+1', (yellow card) 90+1'	Stadium: Bloomfield Road; Attendance: 9,517; Referee: Michael Salisbury

29 December 2019 23	Tranmere Rovers	1–1	Blackpool	Birkenhead
15:00 GMT	Ferrier 43'	Report	Heneghan 10'; Husband (yellow card) 26'; Edwards (yellow card) 38'; Turton (yellow card) 63'; Spearing (yellow card) 85'	Stadium: Prenton Park; Attendance: 8,487 (1,667 away); Referee: Tom Nield

1 January 2020 24	Rotherham United	2–1	Blackpool	Rotherham
15:00 GMT	Smith 21'; Barlaser 85'; Crooks (yellow card) 90+2'	Report	Gnanduillet 34'; Virtue (yellow card) 71'; Spearing (yellow card) 84'; Husband (yellow card) 90+3'	Stadium: New York Stadium; Attendance: 8,689; Referee: James Adcock

18 January 2020 25	Lincoln City	1–0	Blackpool	Lincoln
15:00 GMT	Melbourne (yellow card) 62'; John-Jules 64'	Report		Stadium: Sincil Bank; Attendance: 8,929 (741 away); Referee: Ollie Yates

28 January 2020 26	Wycombe Wanderers	2–1	Blackpool	High Wycombe
20:50 GMT^{1}	Freeman 5'; Samuel 9'	Report	Heneghan (yellow card) 67'; Dewsbury-Hall 86'	Stadium: Adams Park; Referee: Trevor Kettle

1 February 2020 27	Oxford United	2–1	Blackpool	Oxford
15:00 GMT	Browne 18', 40'; Brannagan (yellow card) 36'; Gorrin (yellow card) 53'	Report	Thorniley (yellow card) 1'; Madine 10'; Bola (yellow card) 36'	Stadium: Kassam Stadium; Attendance: 10,525 (476 away); Referee: Josh Smith

8 February 2020 28	Blackpool	2–1	Southend United	Blackpool
15:00 GMT	Gnanduillet 37', 64' (pen.)	Report	McLaughlin 72', (yellow card) 90'	Stadium: Bloomfield Road; Attendance: 7,870; Referee: Anthony Backhouse

11 February 2020 29	Blackpool	2–3	Gillingham	Blackpool
19:45 GMT	Gnanduillet 7'; Ronan (yellow card) 24'; Delfouneso 90+1'	Report	O'Keefe (yellow card) 59'; Akinde 73'; Charles-Cook 76'; Hanlan 90+4'	Stadium: Bloomfield Road; Attendance: 6,816; Referee: Darren Handley

15 February 2020 30	Bristol Rovers	2–1	Blackpool	Horfield
15:00 GMT	Upson (yellow card) 54'; Kilgour 73'; Ginnelly 84'	Report	Madine 2'; Husband (yellow card) 30'; Heneghan (red card) 43'	Stadium: Memorial Stadium; Referee: Brett Huxtable

22 February 2020 31	AFC Wimbledon	0–0	Blackpool	Kingston upon Thames
15:00 GMT		Report	Dewsbury-Hall (yellow card) 50'	Stadium: Kingsmeadow; Attendance: 4,593 (540 away); Referee: Neil Hair

25 February 2020 32	Blackpool	2–1	Bolton Wanderers	Blackpool
19:45 GMT	Ronan 13'; Husband (yellow card) 74'; Dewsbury-Hall 90'	Report	Hamilton (yellow card) 32'; Murphy (yellow card) 66'; Bryan 88'	Stadium: Bloomfield Road; Attendance: 8,116; Referee: Paul Marsden

29 February 2020 33	Blackpool	2–1	Ipswich Town	Blackpool
15:00 GMT	Dewsbury-Hall 26', (yellow card) 81'; Macdonald (yellow card) 86'; Nuttall 90+3', (yellow card) 90+3'	Report	Sears 54'; Downes (yellow card) 59'	Stadium: Bloomfield Road; Attendance: 9,500; Referee: Chris Sarginson

7 March 2020 34	Fleetwood Town	0–0	Blackpool	Fleetwood
15:00 GMT		Report	Husband (yellow card) 64'; Virtue (yellow card) 80'	Stadium: Highbury Stadium; Attendance: 4,884; Referee: John Busby

10 March 2020 (rescheduled from 25 January)^{2} 35	Blackpool	1–2	Tranmere Rovers	Blackpool
15:00 GMT	Virtue (yellow card) 32'; Dewsbury-Hall 58'; Macdonald (yellow card) 74'	Report	Woodyard (yellow card) 24'; Ferrier 37'; Vaughan 45+1'	Stadium: Bloomfield Road; Attendance: 8,235; Referee: Seb Stockbridge

14 March 2020^{3}	Blackpool	v	Sunderland	Blackpool
15:00 GMT				Stadium: Bloomfield Road

21 March 2020^{3}	Shrewsbury Town	v	Blackpool	Shrewsbury
15:00 GMT				Stadium: Montgomery Waters Meadow

29 March 2020^{3}	Peterborough United	v	Blackpool	Peterborough
15:30 GMT				Stadium: Weston Homes Stadium

4 April 2020^{4}	Blackpool	v	Burton Albion	Blackpool
15:00 GMT				Stadium: Bloomfield Road

10 April 2020^{4}	Blackpool	v	Rochdale	Blackpool
15:00 BST				Stadium: Bloomfield Road

13 April 2020^{4}	Portsmouth	v	Blackpool	Milton
13:00 BST				Stadium: Fratton Park

18 April 2020^{4}	Blackpool	v	Coventry City	Blackpool
15:00 BST				Stadium: Bloomfield Road

25 April 2020^{4}	Milton Keynes Dons	v	Blackpool	Milton Keynes
15:00 BST				Stadium: Stadium MK

3 May 2020^{4}	Blackpool	v	Doncaster Rovers	Blackpool
15:00 BST				Stadium: Bloomfield Road

^1 – Delayed due to medical emergency
^2 – Fixture was postponed due to Tranmere's FA Cup progression.
^3 – Season was suspended until 3 April due to the COVID-19 pandemic.
^4 – On 3 April, the English Football League decided to postpone all football until safe to do so due to the COVID-19 pandemic.

=== FA Cup ===
9 November 2019 1	Blackpool	4–1	Morecambe	Blackpool
15:00 GMT	Delfouneso 9'; Gnanduillet 24'; Virtue 45'; Kaikai 84'	Report	O'Sullivan (yellow card) 27'; Conlan (yellow card) 35'; Stockton 45+2'; Tanner (yellow card) 49'; Wildig (yellow card) 53'	Stadium: Bloomfield Road; Attendance: 5,371; Referee: Ross Joyce

1 December 2019 2	Blackpool	3–1	Maidstone United	Blackpool
15:00 GMT	Elokobi 47' (o.g.); Delfouneso 50', 51'	Report	Khan 29'	Stadium: Bloomfield Road; Attendance: 3,977; Referee: James Adcock

4 January 2020 3	Reading	2–2	Blackpool	Reading
15:01 GMT	Baldock 56'; Loader 66'	Report	Delfouneso 28'; Gnanduillet 60'; Macdonald (yellow card) 65'; Guy (yellow card) 72'; Tilt (yellow card) 90+2'	Stadium: Madejski Stadium; Attendance: 10,181; Referee: John Brooks

14 January 2020 3 (replay)	Blackpool	0–2	Reading	Blackpool
19:45 GMT	Virtue (yellow card) 24'; Spearing (yellow card) 55'; Husband (yellow card) 85'	Report	Boyé 42'; Obita 82'	Stadium: Bloomfield Road; Attendance: 5,213; Referee: Darren Bond

=== EFL Cup ===
The first-round draw was made on 20 June.

13 August 2019 1	Blackpool	2–2 (2–4 p)	Macclesfield Town	Blackpool
19:45 BST	Bushiri (yellow card) 21'; Turton 31'; Spearing (yellow card) 65'; Gnanduillet 90' (pen.)	Report	Bushiri 39' (o.g.); Gomis 65', (yellow card) 92'; Archibald (yellow card) 72'; Kirby (yellow card) 74'	Stadium: Bloomfield Road; Attendance: 3,715; Referee: Martin Coy
	Penalties
	Pritchard (penalty scored); Kaikai (penalty missed); Delfouneso (penalty scored); Thompson (penalty missed)		(penalty missed) Horsfall; (penalty scored) Archibald; (penalty scored) Osadebe; (penalty scored) Clarke; (penalty scored) Evans

=== EFL Trophy ===
On 9 July 2019, the pre-determined group stage draw was announced with invited clubs to be drawn on 12 July 2019. Blackpool were drawn in Northern Group G. They finished top after their three matches. The draw for the second round was made on 16 November 2019 live on Sky Sports.

Pos	Div	Team	Pld	W	PW	PL	L	GF	GA	GD	Pts	Qualification
1	L1	Blackpool	3	2	0	0	1	7	3	+4	6	Advance to Round 2
2	ACA	Wolverhampton Wanderers U21	3	1	1	0	1	6	5	+1	5	Advance to Round 2
3	L2	Morecambe	3	1	0	1	1	6	8	−2	4	
4	L2	Carlisle United	3	1	0	0	2	5	8	−3	3	

Source: EFL.com

3 September 2019 Group stage Northern Group G	Blackpool	5–1	Morecambe	Blackpool
19:30 BST	Heneghan 4'; Nottingham 45+1'; Hardie 51'; Kaikai 89'; Nuttall 90+1'	Report	Ellison 22'; Sutton (yellow card) 84'	Stadium: Bloomfield Road; Attendance: 2,219; Referee: Marc Edwards

15 October 2019 Group stage Northern Group G	Carlisle United	2–1	Blackpool	Carlisle
19:45 BST	Mellish (yellow card) 38'; Loft 45+2'; Carroll (yellow card) 69'; Carroll 87'	Report	Gray 25' (o.g.); Spearing (yellow card) 74'	Stadium: Brunton Park; Attendance: 911; Referee: Darren Handley

5 November 2019 Group stage Northern Group G	Blackpool	1–0	Wolverhampton Wanderers U21	Blackpool
19:45 GMT	Hardie (yellow card) 72'; Gnanduillet (yellow card) 89'; Guy (yellow card) 90'; Bushiri 90+3', (yellow card) 90+3'	Report		Stadium: Bloomfield Road; Attendance: 1,036; Referee: Anthony Backhouse

27 November 2019 2	Blackpool	1–3	Scunthorpe United	Blackpool
19:45 GMT	Scannell (yellow card) 47'; Nuttall 70'; Guy (yellow card) 19' (yellow-red card) 73'; Thompson (yellow card) 88'	Report	van Veen 12' (yellow card) 30'; Eisa 25', 90'	Stadium: Bloomfield Road; Referee: Ben Toner

== Squad statistics ==
No.	Pos.	Name	League		FA Cup		League Cup		League Trophy		Total		Discipline	
No.	Pos.	Name	Apps	Goals	Apps	Goals	Apps	Goals	Apps	Goals	Apps	Goals	Yellow card	Red card
1	GK	(England) Mark Howard	4	0	2	0	0	0	2	0	8	0	0	0
3	DF	(England) Nick Anderton (joined Carlisle United on 16 January)	2	0	0	0	1	0	2	0	5	0	0	0
3	DF	(England) Marc Bola (on loan)	5	0	0	0	0	0	0	0	5	0	1	0
4	DF	(Belgium) Rocky Bushiri (on loan)	4	0	0	0	1	0	2	1	7	1	3	0
4	DF	(England) Jordan Thorniley	2	0	0	0	0	0	0	0	2	0	1	0
5	DF	(England) Ryan Edwards	21	1	2	0	1	0	3	0	27	1	4	0
6	DF	(England) Ben Heneghan (on loan)	26	2	4	0	0	0	1	1	31	3	7	1
7	FW	(England) Nathan Delfouneso	28	3	4	4	1	0	2	0	35	7	1	0
8	MF	(England) Jay Spearing	29	2	4	0	1	0	1	0	35	2	11	0
9	FW	(Scotland) Ryan Hardie	7	0	0	0	1	0	4	1	12	1	1	0
10	MF	(England) Sullay Kaikai	22	4	2	1	1	0	3	1	28	6	0	0
11	MF	(England) Liam Feeney	35	1	4	0	1	0	2	0	42	1	1	0
12	DF	(Saint Kitts and Nevis) Michael Nottingham	3	0	0	0	1	0	2	1	6	1	0	0
14	MF	(England) Harry Pritchard (joined Bradford City on 30 August)	2	0	0	0	1	0	0	0	3	0	0	0
14	MF	(England) Sean Scannell	8	1	0	0	1	0	3	0	12	1	2	0
15	MF	(Northern Ireland) Jordan Thompson (joined Stoke City on 17 January)	17	1	2	0	1	0	1	0	21	1	5	0
15	MF	(England) Kiernan Dewsbury-Hall (on loan)	10	4	0	0	0	0	0	0	10	4	2	0
16	DF	(England) Curtis Tilt (joined Rotherham United on 31 January)	20	0	2	0	0	0	2	0	24	0	5	1
17	MF	(England) Matty Virtue	24	2	4	1	0	0	3	0	31	3	6	0
20	DF	(England) Ollie Turton	30	0	4	0	1	1	4	0	39	1	4	0
21	FW	(France) Armand Gnanduillet	30	15	3	2	1	1	2	0	36	18	4	0
23	GK	(England) Jak Alnwick (on loan)	22	0	2	0	0	0	0	0	24	0	1	0
24	FW	(England) Joe Nuttall	28	2	3	0	0	0	3	2	34	4	2	0
25	MF	(England) Callum Guy (joined Carlisle United on 30 January)	15	0	3	0	0	0	4	0	22	0	5	1
26	DF	(England) James Husband (on loan initially; signed permanently on 25 January)	28	0	4	0	0	0	0	0	32	0	9	1
27	MF	(England) Grant Ward	5	0	2	0	0	0	0	0	7	0	0	0
28	GK	(England) Jack Sims	1	0	0	0	0	0	0	0	1	0	0	0
29	DL	(Scotland) Calum Macdonald	12	0	3	0	0	0	4	0	19	0	4	0
30	FW	(England) Gary Madine	10	2	0	0	0	0	0	0	10	2	0	0
32	GK	(Wales) Chris Maxwell	9	0	0	0	0	0	0	0	9	0	0	0
34	MF	(England) Nathan Shaw	0	0	0	0	0	0	2	0	2	0	0	0
35	FW	(England) Ewan Bange	0	0	0	0	0	0	1	0	1	0	0	0
36	FW	(England) Tony Weston	0	0	1	0	0	0	0	0	1	0	0	0
37	GK	(Republic of the Congo) Christoffer Mafoumbi	0	0	0	0	1	0	2	0	3	0	0	0
40	MF	(Republic of Ireland) Connor Ronan (on loan)	10	1	0	0	0	0	0	0	10	1	0	0
42	DF	(England) Taylor Moore (on loan)	8	0	0	0	0	0	0	0	8	0	0	0
Discipline totals													79	4

- Players used: 36
- Goals scored: 63 (including five own-goals)

Statistics accurate as of 10 March 2020

== Transfers ==
=== Transfers in ===
Date	Position	Nationality	Name	From	Fee	Ref.
1 July 2019	AM	(Republic of Ireland)	Jamie Devitt	Free agency	—	
1 July 2019	CB	(England)	Ryan Edwards	Free agency	—	
1 July 2019	RM	(England)	Ben Tollitt	Free agency	—	
1 July 2019	CF	(Tanzania)	Adi Yussuf	Free agency	—	
3 July 2019	LW	(England)	Sullay Kaikai	Free agency	—	
17 July 2019	CF	(Scotland)	Ryan Hardie	Rangers	Undisclosed	
1 August 2019	CF	(England)	Joe Nuttall	Blackburn Rovers	Undisclosed	
27 August 2019	LB	(Scotland)	Calum Macdonald	Derby County	—	
30 August 2019	LW	(England)	Sean Scannell	Bradford City	—	
1 January 2020	LW	(England)	Grant Ward	Free agency	—	
1 January 2020	CB	(England)	Jordan Thorniley	Sheffield Wednesday	Undisclosed	
16 January 2020	CF	(England)	Gary Madine	Free agency	—	
24 January 2020	GK	(Wales)	Chris Maxwell	Free agency	—	
25 January 2020	LB	(England)	James Husband	Norwich City	—	
31 January 2020	RB	(England)	Teddy Howe	Reading	Undisclosed	
31 January 2020	CM	(England)	Ben Garrity	Warrington Town	Undisclosed	

=== Transfers out ===
Date	Position	Nationality	Name	To	Fee	Ref.
1 July 2019	CF	(England)	Max Clayton	Free agency	—	
1 July 2019	CF	(England)	Mark Cullen	Free agency	—	
1 July 2019	CB	(England)	Donervon Daniels	Free agency	—	
1 July 2019	CF	(England)	Chris Long	Free agency	—	
1 July 2019	RM	(Republic of Ireland)	John O'Sullivan	Free agency	—	
1 July 2019	CF	(England)	Scott Quigley	Barrow	—	
1 July 2019	MF	(England)	Finlay Sinclair-Smith	Free agency	—	
1 July 2019	LM	(England)	Chris Taylor	Free agency	—	
28 July 2019	LB	(England)	Marc Bola	Middlesbrough	Undisclosed	
29 July 2019	CM	(Republic of Ireland)	Jimmy Ryan	Rochdale	—	
30 August 2019	RM	(England)	Harry Pritchard	Bradford City	—	
16 January 2020	LB	(England)	Nick Anderton	Carlisle United	Undisclosed	
17 January 2020	CM	(Northern Ireland)	Jordan Thompson	Stoke City	Undisclosed	
30 January 2020	LM	(England)	Ben Tollitt	Free agency	—	
30 January 2020	CM	(England)	Callum Guy	Carlisle United	Undisclosed	
31 January 2020	CB	(England)	Curtis Tilt	Rotherham United	Undisclosed	

=== Loans in ===
Date from	Position	Nationality	Name	From	Date until	Ref.
23 July 2019	GK	(England)	Jak Alnwick	Rangers	30 June 2020	
26 July 2019	LB	(England)	James Husband	Norwich City	30 June 2020	
1 August 2019	CB	(Belgium)	Rocky Bushiri	Norwich City	1 January 2020	
23 August 2019	CB	(England)	Ben Heneghan	Sheffield United	30 June 2020	
10 January 2020	LB	(England)	Marc Bola	Middlesbrough	30 June 2020	
17 January 2020	CM	(Republic of Ireland)	Connor Ronan	Wolverhampton Wanderers	30 June 2020	
27 January 2020	DM	(England)	Kiernan Dewsbury-Hall	Leicester City	30 June 2020	
31 January 2020	CB	(England)	Taylor Moore	Bristol City	30 June 2020	

=== Loans out ===
Date from	Position	Nationality	Name	To	Date until	Ref.
1 July 2019	LB	(Northern Ireland)	Sean Graham	Larne	January 2020	
25 July 2019	GK	(England)	Myles Boney	South Shields	30 June 2020	
23 August 2019	AM	(Republic of Ireland)	Jamie Devitt	Bradford City	30 June 2020	
23 August 2019	AM	(England)	Ben Tollitt	Wrexham	5 January 2020	
30 August 2019	CM	(Spain)	Yusifu Ceesay	Altrincham	4 January 2020	
17 September 2019	FW	(Tanzania)	Adi Yussuf	Solihull Moors	5 January 2020	
22 October 2019	GK	(England)	Mark Howard	Salford City	28 October 2019	
29 October 2019	GK	(England)	Mark Howard	Salford City	4 November 2019	
17 December 2019	AM	(Republic of Ireland)	Rowan Roache	Bamber Bridge	14 January 2020	
9 January 2020	FW	(Scotland)	Ryan Hardie	Plymouth Argyle	30 June 2020	
15 January 2020	GK	(Republic of the Congo)	Christoffer Mafoumbi	Morecambe	30 June 2020	
15 January 2020	CF	(Tanzania)	Adi Yussuf	Boreham Wood	30 June 2020	
16 January 2020	RB	(Saint Kitts and Nevis)	Michael Nottingham	Crewe Alexandra	30 June 2020	
19 February 2020	LW	(England)	Nathan Shaw	Bamber Bridge	19 March 2020	
