= Nya Kirby =

English footballer

Personal information
- Full name: Nya Jerome Kirby
- Date of birth: 31 January 2000 (age 26)
- Place of birth: Islington, England
- Height: 1.74 m (5 ft 8 1/2 in)
- Position: Midfielder

Team information
- Current team: AFC Croydon Athletic

Youth career
- –2017: Tottenham Hotspur
- 2017–2018: Crystal Palace

Senior career*
Years	Team	Apps	(Gls)
2018–2022	Crystal Palace	0	(0)
2019	→ Blackpool (loan)	11	(1)
2021	→ Tranmere Rovers (loan)	6	(0)
2023–2024	Oxford City	27	(2)
2024–	AFC Croydon Athletic	62	(9)

International career
2015–2016	England U16	8	(1)
2016–2017	England U17	13	(0)
2017–2018	England U18	5	(2)
2018	England U19	10	(1)
Medal record
Men's football
Representing England
FIFA U-17 World Cup
Winner	2017 India
- * Club domestic league appearances and goals as of 15:35, 25 April 2026 (UTC)

Nya Jerome Kirby (born 31 January 2000) is an English professional footballer who plays as a midfielder for AFC Croydon Athletic.

== Club career ==
Kirby played youth football for Tottenham Hotspur and Crystal Palace, before moving on loan to Blackpool in January 2019.

He made his debut for Blackpool on 29 January 2019, coming off the bench in a 2–2 draw with Wycombe Wanderers and winning the 85th minute penalty which Harry Pritchard scored to earn a point.

Kirby made his senior debut for Crystal Palace on 15 September 2020 against AFC Bournemouth in the second round of the EFL Cup.

On 22 January 2021, Kirby joined League Two club Tranmere Rovers on loan for the remainder of the 2020–21 season.

Kirby was released by Crystal Palace at the end of the 2021–22 season.

In August 2023, he signed for Oxford City. He scored his first goal for the club on 28 August 2023, opening the scoring in a 4–0 win over Boreham Wood. He left after one season, joining AFC Croydon Athletic shortly after and making his league debut against Ramsgate on 10 August 2024.

== International career ==
He has represented England at under-17, under-18 and under-19 international youth levels.

He was a member of the team that won the 2017 FIFA U-17 World Cup, scoring the decisive penalty in the round of 16 against Japan and was a second-half substitute against Spain in the final. Kirby also represented England under-19 at the 2018 UEFA European Under-19 Championship.

== Career statistics ==
As of 27 March 2021

Appearances and goals by club, season and competition
Club	Season	League			FA Cup		League Cup		Other		Total	
Club	Season	Division	Apps	Goals	Apps	Goals	Apps	Goals	Apps	Goals	Apps	Goals
Crystal Palace	2018–19	Premier League	0	0	0	0	0	0	—		0	0
Crystal Palace	2019–20	Premier League	0	0	0	0	0	0	—		0	0
Crystal Palace	2020–21	Premier League	0	0	0	0	1	0	—		1	0
Crystal Palace	Total		0	0	0	0	1	0	0	0	1	0
Blackpool (loan)	2018–19	League One	11	1	0	0	0	0	0	0	11	1
Tranmere Rovers (loan)	2020–21	League Two	6	0	—		—		2 (Note: Appearances in EFL Trophy)	0	8	0
Career total			17	0	0	0	1	0	2	0	20	1

== Honours ==
Tranmere Rovers

- EFL Trophy runner-up: 2020–21

England U17

- FIFA U-17 World Cup: 2017
