= Jack Sims =

English footballer

Personal information
- Full name: Jack Stephen John Sims
- Date of birth: 10 March 1999 (age 27)
- Place of birth: Southend-on-Sea, England
- Height: 1.83 m (6 ft 0 in)
- Position: Goalkeeper

Team information
- Current team: Southend United
- Number: 13

Youth career
- Canvey Island
- 2009–2015: Southend United
- 2015–2017: Blackpool

Senior career*
Years	Team	Apps	(Gls)
2017–2021	Blackpool	1	(0)
2017	→ Skelmersdale United (loan)	12	(0)
2018–2019	→ Lancaster City (loan)	34	(0)
2021–2022	Welling United	23	(0)
2022–2024	Braintree Town	79	(0)
2024–2026	Sutton United	63	(0)
2026–	Southend United	0	(0)
- * Club domestic league appearances and goals as of 13:05, 1st August 2026 (UTC)

Jack Stephen John Sims (born 10 March 1999) is an English footballer who plays as a goalkeeper for Southend United.

== Career ==
Sims started his career with local side, Canvey Island before spending six years at Southend United and then eventually joining Blackpool as a 16-year old. Prior to making his Football League debut in December 2019, during a 1–0 defeat to Acrrington Stanley, replacing an injured Jak Alnwick with 60 minutes remaining, Sims enjoyed loan spells at both Skelmersdale United and Lancaster City (where he earned the player of the season award) between 2017 and 2019. At the conclusion of the 2020–21 campaign, Sims was released upon the expiry of his contract.

In October 2021, he made the move to National League South side, Welling United and went onto 24 times in all competitions winning three consecutive player of the months in the process before joining Braintree Town ahead of the 2022–23 campaign.

On 7 June 2024, Sims was announced to have departed Braintree Town having been unable to agree a new contract. Later that same day, he joined National League side Sutton United.

== Career statistics ==
As of match played 7 June 2024

Appearances and goals by club, season and competition
Club	Season	League			FA Cup		EFL Cup		Other		Total	
Club	Season	Division	Apps	Goals	Apps	Goals	Apps	Goals	Apps	Goals	Apps	Goals
Blackpool	2017–18	League One	0	0	—		0	0	0	0	0	0
Blackpool	2018–19	League One	0	0	0	0	0	0	0	0	0	0
Blackpool	2019–20	League One	1	0	0	0	0	0	0	0	1	0
Blackpool	2020–21	League One	0	0	0	0	0	0	2 (Note: Appearances in the EFL Trophy)	0	2	0
Blackpool	Total		1	0	0	0	0	0	2	0	3	0
Skelmersdale United (loan)	2017–18	Northern Premier League Division One North	12	0	2	0	—		2 (Note: One appearance in the FA Trophy, one in the Northern Premier League Challenge Cup)	0	16	0
Lancaster City (loan)	2018–19	Northern Premier League Premier Division	No data currently available									
Welling United	2021–22	National League South	23	0	—		—		1 (Note: Appearances in the FA Trophy)	0	24	0
Braintree Town	2022–23	National League South	41	0	1	0	—		4 (Note: Three appearances in the FA Trophy, one in the National League South play-offs)	0	46	0
Braintree Town	2023–24	National League South	38	0	3	0	—		4 (Note: One appearance in the FA Trophy, three in the National League South play-offs)	0	45	0
Braintree Town	Total		79	0	4	0	—		8	0	91	0
Career total			115	0	6	0	0	0	13	0	134	0

== Honours ==
Braintree Town

- National League South play-offs: 2024
