= Myles Boney =

English footballer (born 1998)

Personal information
- Full name: Myles Laurence Boney
- Date of birth: 1 February 1998 (age 28)
- Place of birth: Blackpool, England
- Position: Goalkeeper

Team information
- Current team: Morecambe
- Number: 13

Senior career*
Years	Team	Apps	(Gls)
2015–2020	Blackpool	2	(0)
2018	→ Nantwich Town (loan)		
2019	→ Solihull Moors (loan)	0	(0)
2019–2020	→ South Shields (loan)	27	(0)
2020–2025	South Shields	167	(0)
2021	→ Darlington (loan)	0	(0)
2025	Matlock Town	2	(0)
2025–	Morecambe	9	(0)
- * Club domestic league appearances and goals as of 08:05, 13 September 2026 (UTC)

Myles Laurence Boney (born 1 February 1998) is an English professional footballer who plays as a goalkeeper for Morecambe.

== Career ==
=== Blackpool ===
Boney was born in Blackpool and began his career with his hometown club.

In April 2015 Boney was selected for an England national goalkeeper's training camp.

In July 2015 he went on trial with Manchester City.

He made his debut for Blackpool on 10 November 2015 in the Football League Trophy, appearing as a 77th-minute substitute following an injury to Kyle Letheren. He moved on loan to Nantwich Town in January 2018.

On 14 May 2018, Boney signed a new one-year deal with Blackpool. On 31 December 2018, Boney joined Solihull Moors on a one-month loan deal. After only 12 days, he was recalled.

In July 2019 he moved on loan to South Shields. He made 35 appearances for the club in all competitions.

In June 2020 it was announced that he would leave Blackpool at the end of his contract.

=== Later career ===
On 21 July 2020 he re-joined South Shields on a permanent transfer.

Boney made 16 appearances in all competitions, before joining National League North side Darlington on loan as goalkeeping cover.

He departed South Shields upon the expiration of his contract at the end of the 2024–25 season. He signed for Matlock Town in June 2025, being released in November 2025. He signed for Morecambe on non-contract terms in December 2025.

== Career statistics ==
As of end of 2024–25 season

Club	Season	League			FA Cup		League Cup		Other		Total	
Club	Season	Division	Apps	Goals	Apps	Goals	Apps	Goals	Apps	Goals	Apps	Goals
Blackpool	2015–16	League One	0	0	0	0	0	0	1 (Note: Appearance(s) in EFL Trophy)	0	1	0
Blackpool	2016–17	League Two	1	0	0	0	0	0	2	0	3	0
Blackpool	2017–18	League One	0	0	0	0	0	0	0	0	0	0
Blackpool	2018–19	League One	1	0	0	0	0	0	1	0	2	0
Blackpool	2019–20	League One	0	0	0	0	0	0	0	0	0	0
Blackpool	Total		2	0	0	0	0	0	4	0	6	0
South Shields (loan)	2019–20	NPL Premier Division	27	0	2	0	—		6 (Note: Four appearances in FA Trophy, one appearance in Durham Challenge Cup, one appearance in NPL Challenge Cup)	0	35	0
South Shields	2020–21	NPL Premier Division	9	0	5	0	—		2 (Note: Appearance(s) in FA Trophy)	0	16	0
South Shields	2021–22	NPL Premier Division	39	0	2	0	—		2 (Note: One appearance in FA Trophy, one appearance in Northern Premier League Premier Division play-offs)	0	43	0
South Shields	2022–23	NPL Premier Division	42	0	5	0	—		2	0	49	0
South Shields	2023–24	National League North	45	0	2	0	—		1	0	48	0
South Shields	2024–25	National League North	32	0	1	0	—		1	0	34	0
South Shields	Total		167	0	15	0	0	0	8	0	190	0
Career total			196	0	17	0	0	0	18	0	231	0
