= Matty Virtue =

English footballer

Personal information
- Full name: Matthew Joseph Virtue-Thick
- Date of birth: 2 May 1997 (age 29)
- Place of birth: Epsom, England
- Height: 5 ft 9 in (1.75 m)
- Position: Midfielder

Team information
- Current team: Swindon Town
- Number: 24

Youth career
- –2006: Chelsea
- 2008–2017: Liverpool

Senior career*
Years	Team	Apps	(Gls)
2017–2019	Liverpool	0	(0)
2018	→ Notts County (loan)	13	(0)
2019–2024	Blackpool	84	(7)
2022–2023	→ Lincoln City (loan)	30	(3)
2024–2026	Fleetwood Town	75	(12)
2026–	Swindon Town	10	(0)
- * Club domestic league appearances and goals as of 13:39, 22 November 2026 (UTC)

Matthew Joseph Virtue-Thick (born 2 May 1997) is an English professional footballer who plays as a midfielder for Swindon Town. He has previously played for Liverpool, Notts County, and Fleetwood Town.

== Career ==
Virtue joined Liverpool at under-11 level, having played with Chelsea until the age of 9. He moved on loan to Notts County in January 2018.

He was named captain of Liverpool's Under-23 team in October 2018. In January 2019, he signed for Blackpool. He scored his first professional goal against Accrington Stanley on 5 March 2019.

On 16 October 2020, Virtue signed a new two-year contract with Blackpool. In December 2020 he tested positive for COVID-19 and had to self-isolate, missing matches. In October 2021 he extended his contract for a further year.

He moved on loan to Lincoln City on 1 September 2022. He made his debut coming off the bench against Cambridge United on 3 September 2022. He scored his first goal for Lincoln City against Bristol Rovers in a 6–3 win on 17 September 2022. After a period injured, he returned to the Lincoln first-team.

Following the conclusion of the 2023–24 season, Blackpool confirmed that Virtue would be departing the club upon the expiration of his contract.

Virtue signed for Fleetwood Town on 1 July 2024. On 15 May 2026, the club announced he would be leaving in the summer when his contract expired.

In June 2026 it was announced that he would sign for Swindon Town on 1 July 2026.

== Career statistics ==
As of match played 21 November 2026

Appearances and goals by club, season and competition
Club	Season	League			FA Cup		League Cup		Other		Total	
Club	Season	Division	Apps	Goals	Apps	Goals	Apps	Goals	Apps	Goals	Apps	Goals
Liverpool	2017–18	Premier League	0	0	0	0	0	0	0	0	0	0
Liverpool	2018–19	Premier League	0	0	0	0	0	0	0	0	0	0
Liverpool	Total		0	0	0	0	0	0	0	0	0	0
Notts County (loan)	2017–18	League Two	13	0	1	0	0	0	1	0	15	0
Blackpool	2018–19	League One	13	3	0	0	0	0	0	0	13	3
Blackpool	2019–20	League One	24	2	4	1	0	0	3 (Note: Appearance(s) in EFL Trophy)	0	31	3
Blackpool	2020–21	League One	16	2	2	0	1	0	1	0	20	2
Blackpool	2021–22	Championship	3	0	0	0	0	0	0	0	3	0
Blackpool	2022–23	Championship	3	0	0	0	0	0	0	0	3	0
Blackpool	2023–24	League One	25	0	2	0	2	0	5	1	34	1
Blackpool	Total		84	7	8	1	3	0	9	1	104	9
Lincoln City (loan)	2022–23	League One	30	3	1	0	2	1	3	0	36	4
Fleetwood Town	2024–25	League Two	41	9	1	0	3	0	2	0	47	9
Fleetwood Town	2025–26	League Two	34	3	3	0	1	0	4	0	42	3
Fleetwood Town	Total		75	12	4	0	4	0	6	0	89	12
Swindon Town	2026–27	League Two	10	0	1	0	1	0	2	0	14	0
Career total			212	23	15	1	10	1	21	1	258	25
