= Marc Bola =

English footballer (born 1997)

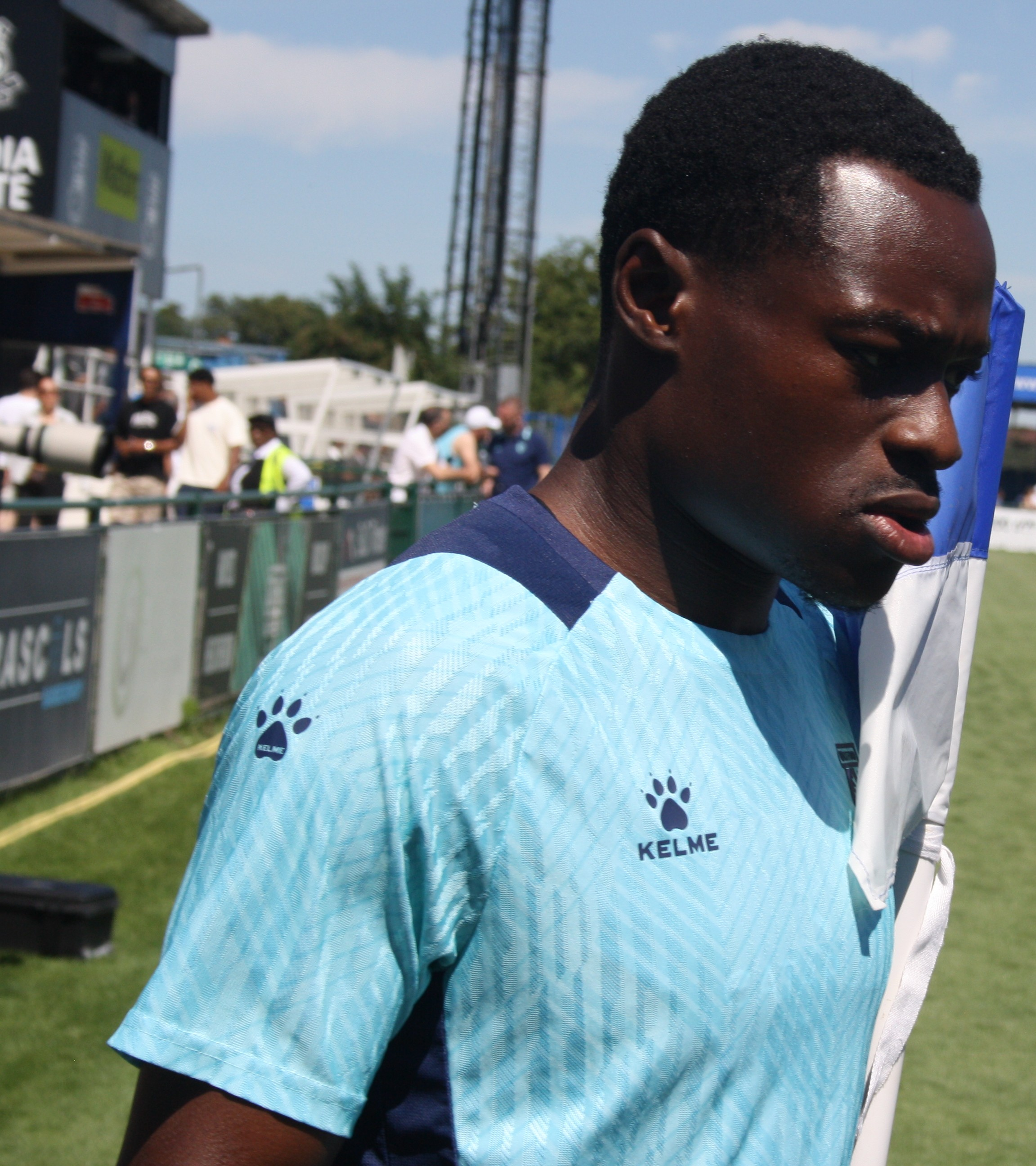
- Bola in 2025.

Personal information
- Full name: Marc Joel Bola
- Date of birth: 9 December 1997 (age 28)
- Place of birth: Greenwich, England
- Height: 6 ft 1 in (1.85 m)
- Position: Left back

Team information
- Current team: Watford
- Number: 16

Youth career
- Arsenal

Senior career*
Years	Team	Apps	(Gls)
2016–2018	Arsenal	0	(0)
2017	→ Notts County (loan)	13	(0)
2017–2018	→ Bristol Rovers (loan)	18	(0)
2018–2019	Blackpool	35	(2)
2019–2023	Middlesbrough	96	(2)
2020	→ Blackpool (loan)	6	(0)
2023–2025	Samsunspor	53	(1)
2025–	Watford	45	(2)
- * Club domestic league appearances and goals as of 09:20, 22 November 2026 (UTC)

Marc Joel Bola (born 9 December 1997) is an English professional footballer who plays as a left back for EFL Championship club Watford.

== Early and personal life ==
Bola grew up supporting Arsenal, the team he started his professional career at. He is of Congolese descent.

== Career ==
=== Arsenal ===
Born in London Borough of Greenwich, Bola joined Arsenal Academy when he was 13 after being spotted playing Sunday league football and at 16, he earned a scholarship. After progressing through the ranks, he was promoted to the reserve side. At the reserve side, Bola became a regular there and scored his first goal for the reserve side on 9 March 2016, in a 3–3 draw against Fulham U23.

Bola turned professional with Arsenal in April 2016.

Bola moved on loan to Notts County in January 2017. He made his Notts County debut on 4 February 2017, where he played 53 minutes, in a 2–0 loss against Accrington Stanley, and went on to make 13 appearances for the side before returning to his parent club at the end of the season.

In July 2017, he signed a season-long loan deal with Bristol Rovers. Bola made his Bristol Rovers debut on 16 September 2017, in a 3–0 loss against Wigan Athletic.

=== Blackpool ===
He was released by Arsenal at the end of the 2017–18 season. Following his release he signed for Blackpool on a one-year contract. He was sent off in September 2018, but the club appealed to the FA who overruled it and rescinded the three-match ban.

=== Middlesbrough ===
Bola joined Middlesbrough on 28 July 2019 for an undisclosed fee. He scored on his debut for Middlesbrough in an EFL Cup tie against Crewe Alexandra on 13 August 2019. On 10 January 2020 he returned to Blackpool on loan until the end of the 2019–20 season. In September 2021, a complaint was made about a Tweet Bola had posted 9 years earlier, when he was 14 years old, and he was charged with "aggravated misconduct" by the FA. An FA hearing was concluded on 3 November 2021 which found he had shown "genuine remorse". He was not suspended and, instead, ordered to attend a face-to-face education programme.

=== Samsunspor ===
On 9 July 2023, Bola signed for Turkish Süper Lig side Samsunspor for an undisclosed fee.

=== Watford ===
On 6 June 2025, Bola agreed to return to England, joining Championship side Watford on a three-year deal. On 7 November 2025, he scored his first goal for the club in a 1–1 draw at home against Bristol City. On 11 August 2026, he extended his contract with the club until 2030.

== Career statistics ==
As of match played 21 November 2026

Appearances and goals by club, season and competition
Club	Season	League			National cup (Note: Includes FA Cup, Turkish Cup)		League cup (Note: Includes EFL Cup)		Other		Total	
Club	Season	Division	Apps	Goals	Apps	Goals	Apps	Goals	Apps	Goals	Apps	Goals
Arsenal	2016–17	Premier League	0	0	0	0	0	0	0	0	0	0
Arsenal	2017–18	Premier League	0	0	0	0	0	0	0	0	0	0
Arsenal	Total		0	0	0	0	0	0	0	0	0	0
Notts County (loan)	2016–17	League Two	13	0	0	0	0	0	0	0	13	0
Bristol Rovers (loan)	2017–18	League One	18	0	0	0	2	0	3 (Note: Appearances in the EFL Trophy)	0	23	0
Blackpool	2018–19	League One	35	2	3	0	4	0	1	0	43	2
Middlesbrough	2019–20	Championship	7	0	0	0	1	1	0	0	8	1
Middlesbrough	2020–21	Championship	41	1	1	0	1	0	0	0	43	1
Middlesbrough	2021–22	Championship	23	1	2	0	0	0	0	0	25	1
Middlesbrough	2022–23	Championship	25	0	1	0	1	0	—		27	0
Middlesbrough	Total		96	2	4	0	3	1	0	0	103	3
Blackpool (loan)	2019–20	League One	6	0	0	0	0	0	0	0	6	0
Samsunspor	2023–24	Süper Lig	20	0	3	0	—		—		23	0
Samsunspor	2024–25	Süper Lig	33	1	0	0	—		—		33	1
Samsunspor	Total		53	1	3	0	0	0	0	0	56	1
Watford	2025–26	Championship	37	2	1	0	1	0	—		39	2
Watford	2026–27	Championship	8	0	0	0	1	1	—		9	1
Watford	Total		45	2	1	0	2	1	0	0	48	3
Career total			266	7	11	0	10	2	4	0	292	9

== Playing style ==
Bola plays primarily as a left back, but can also play as a centre back and a striker.
