= Christoffer Mafoumbi =

Congolese footballer (born 1994)

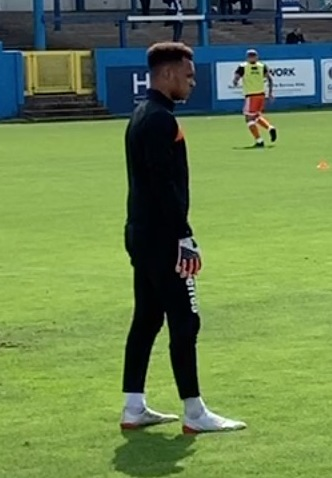
- Mafoumbi warming up for Blackpool before a friendly at Barrow on 20 July 2019

Personal information
- Full name: Christoffer Henri Mafoumbi
- Date of birth: 3 March 1994 (age 32)
- Place of birth: Roubaix, France
- Height: 1.96 m (6 ft 5 in)
- Position: Goalkeeper

Team information
- Current team: Marsaxlokk
- Number: 22

Youth career
- Armentières
- 2005–2010: Lille
- 2010–2011: Lens

Senior career*
Years	Team	Apps	(Gls)
2011–2014	Lens B	28	(0)
2014–2015	Le Pontet	12	(0)
2015–2016	Vereya	3	(0)
2016–2017	Free State Stars	4	(0)
2017–2020	Blackpool	18	(0)
2020	→ Morecambe (loan)	9	(0)
2020–2022	Mosta	23	(0)
2022–2023	Differdange	13	(0)
2023	Noah	9	(0)
2024–2025	Floriana	33	(0)
2025–	Marsaxlokk	24	(0)

International career^{‡}
2012–	Congo	36	(0)
- * Club domestic league appearances and goals as of 7 May 2026 ‡ National team caps and goals as of 10:53, 3 November 2022 (UTC)

Christoffer Henri Mafoumbi (born 3 March 1994) is a professional footballer who plays as a goalkeeper for Marsaxlokk. Born in France, he represents the Republic of Congo national team.

== Club career ==
Born in Roubaix, Mafoumbi joined Lille OSC's youth setup in 2005, aged 11. In 2010, he moved to RC Lens, being later assigned to the reserves in Championnat de France amateur the following year.

Mafoumbi made his senior debut on 26 May 2012, starting in a goalless home draw against AC Amiens. On 12 April 2013, he appeared with the main squad in a goalless away draw against SM Caen for the Ligue 2 championship, but remained as an unused substitute.

On 23 July 2014, Mafoumbi joined US Le Pontet, also in CFA.

On 25 November 2015, Mafoumbi signed a contract with Bulgarian side Vereya.

On 20 July 2017, Mafoumbi signed a two-year contract with English League One side Blackpool.

He joined League Two club Morecambe on loan for the second half of the 2019–20 season on 15 January 2020.

Mafoumbi was released by Blackpool in June 2020.

After spending some time in Malta with Mosta, Mafoumbi joined Luxembourg-based side Differdange for the 2022-23 season. In October 2022, he pledged himself on a part-time basis for the English Lower League side AFC Crewe.

On 23 July 2023, Armenian Premier League club Noah announced the signing of Mafoumbi.

== International career ==
Mafoumbi made his international debut for Congo on 12 October 2012, playing the entire second half in a 0–3 friendly loss against Egypt. On 8 January 2015, he was included in Claude Le Roy's 23-man squad for the 2015 Africa Cup of Nations. Mafoumbi made his debut in the competition on 17 January, starting in a 1–1 draw against Equatorial Guinea.

Mafoumbi started the first two games of Congo's appearance at the 2021 Africa Cup of Nations qualifiers.

== Career statistics ==
=== Club ===
As of match played 3 September 2019

Appearances and goals by club, season and competition
Club	Season	League			Domestic Cup		League Cup		Other		Total	
Club	Season	Division	Apps	Goals	Apps	Goals	Apps	Goals	Apps	Goals	Apps	Goals
Lens B	2011–12	CFA	1	0	–		–		–		1	0
Lens B	2012–13	CFA	19	0	–		–		–		19	0
Lens B	2013–14	CFA	8	0	–		–		–		8	0
Lens B	Total		28	0	0	0	0	0	0	0	28	0
Le Pontet	2014–15	CFA	12	0	0	0	–		–		12	0
Vereya Stara Zagora	2015–16	Bulgarian B Group	3	0	0	0	–		–		3	0
Free State Stars	2016–17	South African Premier Division	4	0	1	0	–		0	0	5	0
Blackpool	2017–18	League One	4	0	0	0	0	0	2 (Note: Appearances in EFL Trophy)	0	6	0
Blackpool	2018–19	League One	14	0	2	0	0	0	2	0	18	0
Blackpool	2019–20	League One	0	0	0	0	1	0	1	0	2	0
Blackpool	Blackpool total		18	0	2	0	1	0	5	0	26	0
Career total			65	0	3	0	1	0	5	0	74	0
