= Harry Pritchard (footballer) =

English footballer

Personal information
- Full name: Harry James Pritchard
- Date of birth: 14 September 1992 (age 34)
- Place of birth: High Wycombe, England
- Height: 1.73 m (5 ft 8 in)
- Position: Midfielder

Senior career*
Years	Team	Apps	(Gls)
2009–2011	Flackwell Heath		
2011–2012	Burnham	10	(3)
2012–2018	Maidenhead United	217	(41)
2018–2019	Blackpool	39	(3)
2019–2021	Bradford City	37	(5)
2021–2022	Eastleigh	39	(6)
2022–2024	Barnet	84	(18)
2025–2026	Maidenhead United	15	(0)
- * Club domestic league appearances and goals

Harry James Pritchard (born 14 September 1992) is an English retired professional football player.

== Career ==
Born in High Wycombe, Pritchard began his career at Flackwell Heath, where he competed in three seasons before moving onto Burnham in November 2011. After two months with the Blues, he joined Maidenhead United. He went on to spend six and a half seasons with the Magpies, during which time he scored 41 league goals. Ten of these came in Maidenhead's National League South title-winning season in 2016–17, including a brace in a 3–0 win at Margate that secured the title on the last day of the season. In May 2017 he signed a new contract with the club, hitting a further 14 goals in their debut season in the National League, including braces against Chester and Guiseley and a penalty at Bromley. After a successful 2017–18 season, in which he also provided 12 assists, it was confirmed that Pritchard had joined Blackpool on a two-year deal on 27 May 2018. He made his English Football League debut for the Tangerines on the opening day on the 2018–19 season, playing the entire match at Wycombe Wanderers.

Pritchard signed a two-year contract with Bradford City on 30 August 2019. He made his debut for the club the next day, as a substitute, before he had trained with his teammates. His early performances for the club were praised by manager Gary Bowyer, who had also signed him for Blackpool. In October 2019 Pritchard said he owed a "debt" to Bowyer for giving him his first professional contract at Blackpool. Later that month he suffered a back spasm during a match and had to be substituted. In December 2019 he called on a team effort to score more goals, while his performances were praised by Bowyer. He suffered an injury later that month, with Bowyer not willing to rush him back. He returned to the first team later that month.

At the start of the 2020–21 season, Pritchard said he was working hard to make his way into the first team after his appearances had been restricted. In March 2021 it was announced that Pritchard would undergo back surgery and would be out of action for a number of months. On 12 May 2021 he was one of nine players that Bradford City announced would leave the club on 30 June 2021 when their contracts expire.

In August 2021 he signed for Eastleigh. He was released after one season with the club. On 27 June 2022, Pritchard joined Barnet.

On 23 August 2024, Pritchard had his Barnet contract terminated by mutual consent due to "unfortunate health issues".

On 9 July 2025, Pritchard re-joined Maidenhead in a joint player and strength and conditioning coach role. He retired from playing at the end of season.

== Playing style ==
Following his first season with Bradford City, in June 2020 he was described as "the jack of all trades in midfield and even up front" who "looked equally at home down the middle or given a run out wide and his form up to Christmas was key in City's continued presence in the promotion places at the time".

== Career statistics ==
As of end of 2025-26 season

Appearances and goals by club, season and competition
Club	Season	League			FA Cup		League Cup		Other		Total	
Club	Season	Division	Apps	Goals	Apps	Goals	Apps	Goals	Apps	Goals	Apps	Goals
Burnham	2011–12	SFL Division One Central	10	3	0	0	0	0	0	0	10	3
Maidenhead United	2011–12	Conference South	10	0	0	0	0	0	0	0	10	0
Maidenhead United	2012–13	Conference South	33	6	0	0	0	0	1 (Note: Appearances in the FA Trophy)	0	34	6
Maidenhead United	2013–14	Conference South	29	4	0	0	0	0	2	0	31	4
Maidenhead United	2014–15	Conference South	24	2	0	0	0	0	2	0	26	2
Maidenhead United	2015–16	National League South	39	5	3	1	0	0	2	0	44	6
Maidenhead United	2016–17	National League South	39	10	1	0	0	0	3 (Note: Two appearances and one goal in FA Trophy, one appearance in Berks & Bucks Senior Cup)	1	43	11
Maidenhead United	2017–18	National League	43	14	2	0	0	0	3	2	48	16
Maidenhead United	Total		217	41	6	1	0	0	13	3	236	45
Blackpool	2018–19	League One	37	3	4	1	3	2	3 (Note: Appearances in the EFL Trophy)	0	47	6
Blackpool	2019–20	League One	2	0	0	0	1	0	0	0	3	0
Blackpool	Total		39	3	4	1	4	2	3	0	50	6
Bradford City	2019–20	League Two	21	3	1	0	0	0	1	0	23	3
Bradford City	2020–21	League Two	16	2	1	1	2	1	2	0	21	4
Bradford City	Total		37	5	2	1	2	1	3	0	44	7
Eastleigh	2021–22	National League	39	6	2	0	—		2	1	43	7
Barnet	2022–23	National League	45	12	4	0	—		6 (Note: Five appearances and three goals in FA Trophy, one appearance and one goal in National League playoffs)	4	55	16
Barnet	2023–24	National League	39	6	5	4	—		3 (Note: Two appearances in FA Trophy, one appearance in National League playoffs)	0	47	10
Barnet	Total		84	18	9	4	0	0	9	4	102	26
Maidenhead United	2025–26	National League South	15	0	0	0	—		1 (Note: Appearance in Berks & Bucks Senior Cup)	0	16	0
Career total			441	76	24	7	6	3	31	8	505	94
