= Finlay Sinclair-Smith =

English footballer

Personal information
- Full name: Finlay Sinclair-Smith
- Date of birth: 21 April 2000 (age 26)
- Place of birth: Liverpool, England
- Position: Winger

Team information
- Current team: Marine
- Number: 7

Youth career
- 2013–2017: Blackpool

Senior career*
Years	Team	Apps	(Gls)
2017–2019	Blackpool	0	(0)
2018–2019	→ Marine (loan)	9	(0)
2019	→ Widnes (loan)	9	(1)
2019	Longridge Town	8	(6)
2019–2021	FC United of Manchester	25	(4)
2021–2023	Bamber Bridge	66	(23)
2023–2024	Marine	35	(20)
2024	Radcliffe	0	(0)
2024–	Marine	88	(22)
- * Club domestic league appearances and goals as of 12:46, 26 April 2026 (UTC)

Finlay Sinclair-Smith (born 21 April 2000) is an English semi-professional footballer who plays as a winger for National League North club Marine.

== Career ==
Born in Liverpool, Sinclair-Smith joined Blackpool in 2013. He scored on his senior debut, in a 1–1 home draw against Wigan Athletic on 29 August 2017 in the EFL Trophy. In December 2017 he was one of 11 young players recognised by the League Football Education for their achievements "on and off the pitch". He signed a professional contract with Blackpool in May 2018.

Sinclair-Smith was loaned to Marine on 22 September 2018 for 28 days. He remained at the club until January 2019. In February 2019 he moved on loan to Widnes.

He was released by Blackpool in the summer of 2019 after his contract expired. He signed for Longridge Town for the 2019–20 season.

In December 2019 he joined FC United of Manchester, and made his debut as a substitute on 21 December in a match against Grantham Town.

He signed for Northern Premier League Premier League side Bamber Bridge on a free transfer in September 2021.

Sinclair-Smith then joined Marine in June 2023. He scored the opening goal with a penalty in the 2024 Liverpool Senior Cup final against City of Liverpool, which Marine won 2–0 and did the same in the 2–1 win over Macclesfield in the Northern Premier League playoff final.

After a spell at Radcliffe, Sinclair-Smith returned to Marine in July 2024.

== Career statistics ==
As of 15 August 2024

Appearances and goals by club, season and competition
Club	Season	League			FA Cup		League Cup		Other		Total	
Club	Season	Division	Apps	Goals	Apps	Goals	Apps	Goals	Apps	Goals	Apps	Goals
Blackpool	2017–18	League One	0	0	0	0	0	0	2 (Note: Appearance(s) in Football League Trophy)	1	2	1
Blackpool	2018–19	League One	0	0	0	0	0	0	1	0	1	0
Blackpool	Total		0	0	0	0	0	0	3	1	3	1
Marine (loan)	2018–19	NPL Premier Division	9	0	3	2	1	0	1 (Note: Appearance(s) in FA Trophy)	0	14	2
Widnes (loan)	2018–19	NPL Division One West	9	1	0	0	0	0	1 (Note: Appearance(s) in Liverpool Senior Cup)	0	10	1
Longridge Town	2019–20	NWCFL Premier Division	8	6	2	2	0	0	3 (Note: Two appearances and one goal in FA Vase, one appearance in Lancashire Senior Cup)	1	13	9
FC United of Manchester	2019–20	NPL Premier Division	12	1	0	0	1	0	2 (Note: One appearance FA Trophy, one appearance and goal in Manchester Premier Cup)	1	15	2
FC United of Manchester	2020–21	NPL Premier Division	5	2	3	1	0	0	1	0	9	3
FC United of Manchester	2021–22	NPL Premier Division	8	1	4	1	0	0	0	0	12	2
FC United of Manchester	Total		25	4	7	2	1	0	3	1	36	7
Bamber Bridge	2021–22	NPL Premier Division	25	5	0	0	0	0	1	0	26	5
Bamber Bridge	2022–23	NPL Premier Division	41	18	3	2	0	0	4 (Note: One appearance FA Trophy, one appearance in Lancashire Senior Cup, two appearances in NPL Premier Division play-offs)	0	48	20
Bamber Bridge	Total		66	23	3	2	0	0	5	0	74	25
Marine	2023–24	NPL Premier Division	35	20	5	1	0	0	8 (Note: Two appearances and one goal in FA Trophy, four appearances and three goals in Liverpool Senior Cup, two appearances and one goal in NPL Premier Division play-offs)	5	48	26
Radcliffe	2024–25	National League North	0	0	0	0	0	0	0	0	0	0
Marine	2024–25	National League North	0	0	0	0	0	0	0	0	0	0
Career total			152	54	20	9	2	0	24	8	198	71
