= 2018–19 Blackpool F.C. season =

English football club season

Blackpool F.C.
2018–19 season
- Owner: Owen Oyston (until 13 February); Simon Sadler (businessman) (from 13 June)
- Chairman: Natalie Christopher (until 25 February); Simon Sadler (from 13 June)
- Manager: Gary Bowyer (until 6 August); succeeded by Terry McPhillips
- Stadium: Bloomfield Road
- League One: 10th
- FA Cup: Third round
- EFL Cup: Fourth round
- Top goalscorer: League: Armand Gnanduillet (10); All: Armand Gnanduillet (14)
- Highest home attendance: 15,871 (vs. Southend United, 9 Mar 19)
- Lowest home attendance: 1,910 (vs. Queens Park Rangers, 25 Sep 18)
- Average home league attendance: 4,154
Home colours	Away colours

The 2018–19 season was Blackpool F.C.'s 110th season in the Football League, and their second consecutive season in the third tier of the Football League. They finished the season in tenth place. Along with competing in League One, the club also participated in the FA Cup (eliminated in the third round), League Cup (eliminated in the fourth round) and Football League Trophy (eliminated at the group stage).

The season covered the period from 1 July 2018 to 30 June 2019.

Gary Bowyer, manager of the club since 2016, resigned on 6 August. He was succeeded by Terry McPhillips on 10 September.

Blackpool's top scorer in all competitions was Armand Gnanduillet.

== First-team squad ==
Number	Name	Position	Nationality	Place of birth	Appearances	Goals
Goalkeepers
1	Mark Howard	GK	(England)	Southwark	35	0
37	Christoffer Mafoumbi	GK	(Republic of the Congo) (France)	Roubaix	15	0
Defenders
2	Donervon Daniels	CB	(Montserrat)	Montserrat	41	1
3	Nick Anderton	LB	(England)	Preston	14	0
6	Ben Heneghan	CB	(England)	Manchester	31	1
12	Michael Nottingham	RB	(Saint Kitts and Nevis) (England)	Birmingham	30	3
16	Curtis Tilt	CB	(England)	Walsall	72	4
20	Ollie Turton	RB	(England)	Manchester	71	2
27	Marc Bola	LB	(England)	Greenwich	33	1
Midfielders
4	Jimmy Ryan	CM	(Republic of Ireland) (England)	Liverpool	38	3
5	Antony Evans	AM	(England)	Liverpool	1	0
8	Jay Spearing	DM	(England)	Wallasey	68	4
14	Harry Pritchard	LM	(England)	Maidenhead	32	5
15	Jordan Thompson	CM	(Northern Ireland)	Belfast	33	3
17	Matty Virtue	DM	(England)	Epsom	1	0
18	John O'Sullivan	AM	(Republic of Ireland) (England)	Birmingham	20	1
19	Chris Taylor	LM	(England)	Oldham	13	0
23	Nya Kirby	AM	(England)		1	0
24	Liam Feeney	LM	(Republic of Ireland)	Hammersmith	29	0
25	Callum Guy	CM	(England)	Nottingham	21	1
Forwards
7	Nathan Delfouneso	CF	(England)	Birmingham	152	28
10	Max Clayton	SS	(England)	Crewe	7	1
11	Joe Dodoo	LW	(England) (Ghana)	Kumasi	19	6
21	Armand Gnanduillet	CF	(Ivory Coast) (France)	Angers	90	21
26	Elias Sørensen	CF	(Denmark)		1	0
31	Chris Long	CF	(England)	Huyton	3	2
32	Rowan Roache	CF	(Republic of Ireland)		5	0
Out on loan
9	Mark Cullen	CF	(England)	Ashington	107	26
13	Myles Boney	GK	(England)	Blackpool	5	0

=== Statistics ===
As of 9 February 2019

No.	Pos	Nat	Player	Total		League One		FA Cup		League Cup		League Trophy	
No.	Pos	Nat	Player	Apps	Goals	Apps	Goals	Apps	Goals	Apps	Goals	Apps	Goals
1	GK	(England) ENG	Mark Howard	30	0	23+0	0	3+0	0	4+0	0	0+0	0
2	DF	(Montserrat) MSR	Donervon Daniels	22	0	16+1	0	3+0	0	1+0	0	1+0	0
3	DF	(England) ENG	Nick Anderton	3	0	2+0	0	0+0	0	1+0	0	0+0	0
5	MF	(England) ENG	Antony Evans	1	0	0+1	0	0+0	0	0+0	0	0+0	0
6	DF	(England) ENG	Ben Heneghan	31	1	23+1	1	3+0	0	3+0	0	1+0	0
7	FW	(England) ENG	Nathan Delfouneso	32	6	24+2	6	1+2	0	1+2	0	0+0	0
8	MF	(England) ENG	Jay Spearing	34	4	27+0	2	3+0	1	4+0	1	0+0	0
9	FW	(England) ENG	Mark Cullen	15	4	8+4	3	1+0	1	1+1	0	0+0	0
11	FW	(England) ENG	Joe Dodoo	19	6	9+4	2	3+0	2	1+1	0	1+0	2
12	DF	(Saint Kitts and Nevis) SKN	Michael Nottingham	30	3	9+12	1	2+1	0	4+0	2	0+2	0
13	GK	(England) ENG	Myles Boney	1	0	0+0	0	0+0	0	0+0	0	1+0	0
14	MF	(England) ENG	Harry Pritchard	32	5	9+13	2	1+3	1	2+2	2	1+1	0
15	MF	(Northern Ireland) NIR	Jordan Thompson	32	3	23+3	3	3+0	0	2+1	0	0+0	0
16	DF	(England) ENG	Curtis Tilt	28	3	22+0	3	3+0	0	3+0	0	0+0	0
17	MF	(England) ENG	Matty Virtue	1	0	0+1	0	0+0	0	0+0	0	0+0	0
18	MF	(Republic of Ireland) IRL	John O'Sullivan	19	1	3+9	0	1+1	0	2+1	0	2+0	1
19	MF	(England) ENG	Chris Taylor	13	0	6+2	0	2+0	0	1+0	0	2+0	0
20	DF	(England) ENG	Ollie Turton	28	1	23+0	1	1+0	0	1+2	0	0+1	0
21	FW	(Ivory Coast) CIV	Armand Gnanduillet	34	10	18+8	6	3+0	1	3+0	2	2+0	1
23	MF	(England) ENG	Nya Kirby	1	0	0+1	0	0+0	0	0+0	0	0+0	0
24	MF	(Republic of Ireland) IRL	Liam Feeney	27	0	15+5	0	2+2	0	2+0	0	1+0	0
25	MF	(England) ENG	Callum Guy	22	1	13+2	0	3+0	0	2+0	0	2+0	1
26	FW	(Denmark) DEN	Elias Sørensen	1	0	0+1	0	0+0	0	0+0	0	0+0	0
27	DF	(England) ENG	Marc Bola	33	1	25+0	1	3+0	0	3+1	0	1+0	0
29	FW	(England) ENG	Finlay Sinclair-Smith	1	0	0+0	0	0+0	0	0+0	0	0+1	0
31	FW	(England) ENG	Chris Long	3	2	2+1	2	0+0	0	0+0	0	0+0	0
37	GK	(Republic of the Congo) CGO	Christoffer Mafoumbi	9	0	6+0	0	1+1	0	0+0	0	1+0	0
39	DF	(England) ENG	Joe Bunney	6	0	4+1	0	0+0	0	0+0	0	1+0	0
Players who left the club during the season:
5	DF	(Republic of Ireland) IRL	Paudie O'Connor	14	2	6+2	0	1+0	0	2+1	1	2+0	1
17	DF	(Northern Ireland) NIR	Ryan McLaughlin	10	0	1+5	0	1+0	0	1+0	0	2+0	0
26	FW	(England) ENG	Steve Davies	3	0	0+1	0	0+1	0	0+0	0	0+1	0

=== Goals record ===
As of 9 February 2019

Rank	No.	Nat.	Po.	Name	League One	FA Cup	League Cup	League Trophy	Total
1	21	(Ivory Coast)	CF	Armand Gnanduillet	6	1	1	2	10
2	7	(England)	CF	Nathan Delfouneso	6	0	0	0	6
2	11	(England)	RW	Joe Dodoo	2	2	0	2	6
4	14	(England)	LM	Harry Pritchard	2	1	2	0	5
5	8	(England)	DM	Jay Spearing	2	1	1	0	4
5	9	(England)	CF	Mark Cullen	3	1	0	0	4
7	12	(Saint Kitts and Nevis)	RB	Michael Nottingham	1	0	2	0	3
7	15	(England)	CM	Jordan Thompson	3	0	0	0	3
7	16	(England)	CB	Curtis Tilt	3	0	0	0	3
10	5	(Republic of Ireland)	CB	Paudie O'Connor	0	0	1	1	2
10	31	(England)	CF	Chris Long	2	0	0	0	2
12	6	(England)	CB	Ben Heneghan	1	0	0	0	1
12	18	(England)	AM	John O'Sullivan	0	0	0	1	1
12	20	(England)	RB	Ollie Turton	1	0	0	0	1
12	25	(England)	CM	Callum Guy	0	0	0	1	1
12	27	(England)	LB	Marc Bola	1	0	0	0	1
Total					31	3	11	6	51

=== Disciplinary record ===
As of 9 February 2019

Rank	No.	Nat.	Po.	Name	League One			FA Cup			League Cup			League Trophy			Total		
Rank	No.	Nat.	Po.	Name	Yellow card	(yellow card) (yellow-red card)	Red card	Yellow card	(yellow card) (yellow-red card)	Red card	Yellow card	(yellow card) (yellow-red card)	Red card	Yellow card	(yellow card) (yellow-red card)	Red card	Yellow card	(yellow card) (yellow-red card)	Red card
1	5	(Republic of Ireland)	CB	Paudie O'Connor	4	0	0	0	0	0	1	0	1	0	0	0	5	0	1
2	6	(England)	CB	Ben Heneghan	5	0	0	0	0	0	0	0	0	0	0	0	5	0	0
2	15	(Northern Ireland)	CM	Jordan Thompson	2	0	1	1	0	0	1	0	0	0	0	0	4	0	1
2	20	(England)	RB	Ollie Turton	3	0	0	0	0	0	1	0	0	1	0	0	5	0	0
5	8	(England)	DM	Jay Spearing	3	0	0	0	0	0	0	0	0	0	0	0	3	0	0
5	14	(England)	LM	Harry Pritchard	1	0	0	0	0	0	1	0	0	1	0	0	3	0	0
5	16	(England)	CB	Curtis Tilt	1	0	0	0	0	0	2	0	0	0	0	0	3	0	0
5	19	(England)	LM	Chris Taylor	2	0	0	1	0	0	0	0	0	0	0	0	3	0	0
5	27	(England)	LB	Marc Bola	2	0	1	0	0	0	0	0	0	0	0	0	2	0	1
10	7	(England)	CF	Nathan Delfouneso	2	0	0	0	0	0	0	0	0	0	0	0	2	0	0
10	21	(Ivory Coast)	CF	Armand Gnanduillet	0	0	1	1	0	0	0	0	0	0	0	0	1	0	1
12	2	(Montserrat)	CB	Donervon Daniels	0	0	1	0	0	0	0	0	0	0	0	0	0	0	1
12	9	(England)	CF	Mark Cullen	1	0	0	0	0	0	0	0	0	0	0	0	1	0	0
12	11	(England)	RW	Joe Dodoo	0	0	0	1	0	0	0	0	0	0	0	0	1	0	0
12	18	(England)	AM	John O'Sullivan	0	0	0	0	0	0	0	0	0	1	0	0	1	0	0
12	24	(England)	RM	Liam Feeney	1	0	0	0	0	0	0	0	0	0	0	0	1	0	0
12	25	(England)	CM	Callum Guy	1	0	0	0	0	0	0	0	0	0	0	0	1	0	0
Total					29	0	4	4	0	0	6	0	1	3	0	0	42	0	5

== Transfers ==
=== Transfers in ===
Date from	Position	Nationality	Name	From	Fee	Ref.
1 July 2018	RB	(Saint Kitts and Nevis)	Michael Nottingham	Salford City	Undisclosed	
1 July 2018	AM	(Republic of Ireland)	John O'Sullivan	Free agency	—	
1 July 2018	LM	(England)	Harry Pritchard	Free agency	—	
1 July 2018	LM	(England)	Chris Taylor	Free agency	—	
1 July 2018	CM	(Northern Ireland)	Jordan Thompson	Free agency	—	
5 July 2018	GK	(England)	Mark Howard	Free agency	—	
17 July 2018	LB	(England)	Marc Bola	Arsenal	—	
17 July 2018	RB	(Northern Ireland)	Ryan McLaughlin	Oldham Athletic	Compensation	
18 July 2018	CF	(Ivory Coast)	Armand Gnanduillet	Free agency	—	
9 August 2018	CB	(Montserrat)	Donervon Daniels	Free agency	—	
23 August 2018	RW	(England)	Liam Feeney	Blackburn Rovers	—	
9 September 2018	AM	(Spain)	Yusifu Ceesay	Alvechurch	Undisclosed	
11 October 2018	CF	(England)	Steve Davies	Free agency	—	
1 January 2019	CM	(England)	Callum Guy	Derby County	Undisclosed	
8 January 2019	CF	(England)	Chris Long	Free agency	—	
31 January 2019	DM	(England)	Matty Virtue	Liverpool	Undisclosed	

=== Transfers out ===
Date from	Position	Nationality	Name	To	Fee	Ref.
1 July 2018	CB	(England)	Will Aimson	Released	—	
1 July 2018	CF	(Angola)	Raúl Correia	Released	—	
1 July 2018	DM	(Benin)	Sessi D'Almeida	Released	—	
1 July 2018	LM	(England)	Colin Daniel	Released	—	
1 July 2018	CF	(Jamaica)	Jamille Matt	Released	—	
1 July 2018	CM	(Scotland)	Jim McAlister	Released	—	
1 July 2018	CF	(England)	Danny Philliskirk	Released	—	
1 July 2018	CF	(Ivory Coast)	Armand Gnanduillet	Released	—	
1 July 2018	RB	(England)	Caleb Richards	Released	—	
1 July 2018	CB	(Scotland)	Clark Robertson	Rotherham United	—	
1 July 2018	LB	(England)	Andy Taylor	Released	—	
1 July 2018	CF	(England)	Kyle Vassell	Rotherham United	—	
1 July 2018	GK	(England)	Ben Williams	Released	—	
1 July 2018	CB	(England)	Denzel Williams	Released	—	
31 July 2018	RB	(England)	Kelvin Mellor	Bradford City	—	
27 August 2018	CF	(Angola)	Dolly Menga	Livingston	—	
15 January 2019	CF	(England)	Steve Davies	Hamilton Academical	—	
23 January 2019	RB	(Northern Ireland)	Ryan McLaughlin	Rochdale	Undisclosed	

=== Loans in ===
Start date	Position	Nationality	Name	From	End date	Ref.
1 July 2018	LB	(England)	Joe Bunney	Northampton Town	30 January 2019	
1 July 2018	LW	(Ghana)	Joe Dodoo	Rangers	31 May 2019	
3 July 2018	CB	(England)	Ben Heneghan	Sheffield United	31 May 2019	
6 July 2018	CB	(Republic of Ireland)	Paudie O'Connor	Leeds United	7 January 2019	
31 August 2018	CM	(England)	Callum Guy	Derby County	1 January 2019	
11 January 2019	AM	(England)	Nya Kirby	Crystal Palace	31 May 2019	
21 January 2019	CF	(Denmark)	Elias Sørensen	Newcastle United	31 May 2019	
31 January 2019	AM	(England)	Antony Evans	Everton	31 May 2019	

=== Loans out ===
Start date	Position	Nationality	Name	To	End date	Ref.
5 July 2018	CF	(England)	Scott Quigley	Port Vale	31 December 2018	
17 August 2018	LB	(England)	Nick Anderton	Accrington Stanley	1 January 2019	
9 September 2018	AM	(England)	Yusifu Ceesay	Boston United	October 2018	
22 September 2018	MF	(England)	Finlay Sinclair-Smith	Marine	11 January 2019	
30 September 2018	GK	(England)	Jack Sims	Lancaster City	28 October 2018	
20 October 2018	AM	(Spain)	Yusifu Ceesay	Alvechurch	17 November 2018	
23 November 2018	AM	(Republic of Ireland)	Rowan Roache	FC United of Manchester	21 December 2018	
30 November 2018	AM	(Spain)	Yusifu Ceesay	AFC Telford United	January 2019	
31 December 2018	GK	(England)	Myles Boney	Solihull Moors	27 January 2019	
2 January 2019	CF	(England)	Scott Quigley	FC Halifax Town	31 May 2019	
4 January 2019	AM	(Spain)	Yusifu Ceesay	Nuneaton Borough	February 2019	
28 January 2019	CF	(England)	Mark Cullen	Carlisle United	31 May 2019	
1 February 2019	RM	(Republic of Ireland)	John O'Sullivan	Dundee	31 May 2019	
4 February 2019	AM	(Republic of Ireland)	Rowan Roache	Derby County	31 May 2019	
6 February 2019	AM	(Spain)	Yusifu Ceesay	Altrincham	31 May 2019	
24 February 2019	MF	(England)	Finlay Sinclair-Smith	Widnes	April 2019	

== Competitions ==
=== Friendlies ===
Blackpool announced pre-season friendlies with Nantwich Town, Port Vale, AFC Fylde and Crewe Alexandra.

21 July 2018	Nantwich Town	1–2	Blackpool	Nantwich
12:00 BST	Lawrie 23' (pen.)		Cullen 3'; Bola 50'	Stadium: Weaver Stadium

21 July 2018 Friendly	Port Vale	0–1	Blackpool	Burslem
15:00 BST		Report	Delfouneso 5'	Stadium: Vale Park

24 July 2018 Friendly	AFC Fylde	1–1	Blackpool	Medlar-with-Wesham
19:30 BST	Rowe 4'	Report	Delfouneso 89'	Stadium: Mill Farm

28 July 2018 Friendly	Crewe Alexandra	1–1	Blackpool	Crewe
15:00 BST	Nicholls 51'	Report	Taylor 8'	Stadium: Gresty Road

=== EFL League One ===
==== League table ====
Pos	Team	Pld	W	D	L	GF	GA	GD	Pts
8	Coventry City	46	18	11	17	54	54	0	65
9	Burton Albion	46	17	12	17	66	57	+9	63
10	Blackpool	46	15	17	14	50	52	−2	62
11	Fleetwood Town	46	16	13	17	58	52	+6	61
12	Oxford United	46	15	15	16	58	64	−6	60

Source: EFL Official Website
Rules for classification: 1) Points; 2) Goal difference; 3) Number of goals scored; 4) Head-to-head results

==== Results summary ====
Overall								Home						Away					
Pld	W	D	L	GF	GA	GD	Pts	W	D	L	GF	GA	GD	W	D	L	GF	GA	GD
46	15	17	14	50	52	−2	62	8	8	7	28	26	+2	7	9	7	22	26	−4

Last updated: 4 May 2019.

==== Results by matchday ====
Matchday	1	2	3	4	5	6	7	8	9	10	11	12	13	14	15	16	17	18	19	20	21	22	23	24	25	26	27	28	29	30	31	32	33	34	35	36	37	38	39	40	41	42	43	44	45	46
Ground	A	H	A	H	H	A	H	A	H	A	H	H	H	A	H	A	A	H	A	H	A	H	A	A	H	A	H	A	H	H	A	A	H	A	A	H	H	A	A	H	A	H	A	H	A	H
Result	D	L	D	W	D	D	W	W	D	D	D	W	W	L	L	W	W	W	L	W	L	L	L	D	L	W	D	W	D	W	D	D	L	L	W	D	D	L	W	D	D	L	D	W	L	L
Position	12	17	20	10	12	11	9	9	8	9	13	13	10	12	13	9	7	7	8	8	8	8	8	8	10	9	8	8	8	8	8	8	9	10	8	8	8	9	8	8	8	10	10	9	10	10

Updated to match(es) played on 4 May 2019. Source: 11v11
A = Away; H = Home; W = Win; D = Draw; L = Loss

==== Matches ====
On 21 June 2018, the League Two fixtures for the forthcoming season were announced.

4 August 2018 1	Wycombe Wanderers	0–0	Blackpool	High Wycombe
15:00 BST	Harriman (red card) 89'	Report		Stadium: Adams Park; Attendance: 5,115; Referee: Nick Kinseley

11 August 2018 2	Blackpool	1–2	Portsmouth	Blackpool
15:00 BST	O'Connor (yellow card) 74'; Cullen 81'	Report	Curtis 9', 59'; Evans (yellow card) 46'; Naylor (yellow card) 69'	Stadium: Bloomfield Road; Attendance: 4,154; Referee: Ross Joyce

18 August 2018 3	Shrewsbury Town	0–0	Blackpool	Shrewsbury
15:00 BST		Report	Taylor (yellow card); O'Connor (yellow card) 45+1'; Turton (yellow card) 66'	Stadium: New Meadow; Attendance: 5,216; Referee: Ollie Yates

21 August 2018 4	Blackpool	2–0	Coventry City	Blackpool
19:45 BST	Cullen (yellow card) 20', (goal) 48'; Dodoo 80'	Report		Stadium: Bloomfield Road; Attendance: 3,656; Referee: Robert Lewis

25 August 2018 5	Blackpool	1–1	Accrington Stanley	Blackpool
15:00 BST	Delfouneso 66'	Report	Hughes 90+3'	Stadium: Bloomfield Road; Attendance: 3,354; Referee: Lee Mason

1 September 2018 6	Walsall	0–0	Blackpool	Walsall
15:00 BST		Report	Turton (yellow card) 44'	Stadium: Bescot Stadium; Attendance: 4,762; Referee: Lee Swabey

8 September 2018 7	Blackpool	3–2	Bradford City	Blackpool
15:00 BST	Spearing 84' (pen.), 88'; Tilt 90'	Report	Miller (yellow card) 49'; Wood (yellow card) 50'; Doyle 59'; Payne 64'; O'Donnell (yellow card) 83'	Stadium: Bloomfield Road; Attendance: 4,393; Referee: Simon Hooper

15 September 2018 8	Plymouth Argyle	0–1	Blackpool	Plymouth
15:00 BST		Report	Cullen 14'; Bola (red card) 90+3'; Daniels (red card) 90+3'	Stadium: Home Park; Attendance: 8,658; Referee: Neil Hair

22 September 2018 9	Blackpool	0–0	Luton Town	Blackpool
15:00 BST		Report		Stadium: Bloomfield Road; Attendance: 4,124; Referee: Seb Stockbridge

29 September 2018 10	Peterborough United	2–2	Blackpool	Peterborough
15:00 BST	Bennett 27'; O'Hara 64'	Report	Gnanduillet 58'; Delfouneso 66'	Stadium: London Road Stadium; Attendance: 6,269; Referee: Carl Boyeson

6 October 2018 11	Blackpool	2–2	Rochdale	Blackpool
15:00 BST	Thompson 5'; Tilt 29'; Guy (yellow card) 41'; Spearing (yellow card) 76'	Report	Delaney 9'; Hart (yellow card) 45+3'; M.J. Williams (yellow card) 46'; Perkins (yellow card) 57'; Rathbone (yellow card) 63'; Andrew 86'; J. Williams (yellow card) 90+3'	Stadium: Bloomfield Road; Attendance: 3,520; Referee: Robert Jones

20 October 2018 12	Blackpool	2–0	AFC Wimbledon	Blackpool
15:00 BST	Tilt 7'; Bola 84'	Report	Hanson (yellow card) 21'; Appiah (yellow card) 73'	Stadium: Bloomfield Road; Attendance: 3,246; Referee: Anthony Backhouse

23 October 2018 13	Blackpool	1–0	Scunthorpe United	Blackpool
19:45 BST	Gnanduillet 19'	Report		Stadium: Bloomfield Road; Attendance: 2,769; Referee: Thomas Bramall

27 October 2018 14	Fleetwood Town	3–2	Blackpool	Fleetwood
15:00 BST	Burns 4'; Wallace 11'; Sheron (yellow card) 49'; Madden 57'; Eastham (yellow card) 90+4'	Report	Thompson 34'; Delfouneso 59'; Bola (yellow card) 68'; Turton (yellow card) 69'; Gnanduillet (red card) 90+4'	Stadium: Highbury Stadium; Attendance: 5,035; Referee: John Brooks

3 November 2018 15	Blackpool	0–3	Bristol Rovers	Blackpool
15:00 GMT		Report	O. Clarke 48', 85'; Upson (yellow card) 70'; Craig 77'	Stadium: Bloomfield Road; Attendance: Trevor Kettle; Referee: 3,227

6 November 2018 16	Gillingham	0–1	Blackpool	Gillingham
19:45 GMT		Report	Delfouneso 49'	Stadium: Priestfield Stadium; Referee: Craig Hicks

17 November 2018 17	Southend United	1–2	Blackpool	Southend-on-Sea
15:00 GMT	Demetriou 74'; Turner (red card) 86'	Report	Turton 14'; Gnanduillet 83'	Stadium: Roots Hall; Attendance: 6,882; Referee: Nick Kinseley

24 November 2018 18	Blackpool	3–0	Burton Albion	Blackpool
15:00 GMT	Gnanduillet 46'; Thompson 49'; Dodoo 57'	Report		Stadium: Bloomfield Road; Attendance: 3,163; Referee: Thomas Bramall

27 November 2018 19	Doncaster Rovers	2–0	Blackpool	Doncaster
19:45 GMT	T. Anderson (yellow card) 29'; Kane 45+3'; Marquis 78'	Report	Pritchard (yellow card) 60'; Heneghan (yellow card) 86'	Stadium: Keepmoat Stadium; Attendance: 6,473; Referee: Seb Stockbridge

8 December 2018 20	Blackpool	2–1	Charlton Athletic	Blackpool
15:00 GMT	Gnanduillet 16'; Tilt (yellow card) 25'; Delfouneso 87'	Report	Bielik (yellow card) 15'; Taylor (yellow card) 54'; Aribo 55'	Stadium: Bloomfield Road; Attendance: 3,024; Referee: Tony Harrington

15 December 2018 21	Oxford United	2–0	Blackpool	Oxford
15:00 GMT	Browne 29'; Henry 41', (yellow card) 76'	Report	Heneghan (yellow card) 56'; Feenery (yellow card) 75'; Thompson (yellow card) 89'	Stadium: Kassam Stadium; Attendance: 6,003; Referee: Matt Donohue

22 December 2018 22	Blackpool	0–1	Barnsley	Blackpool
15:00 GMT	Heneghan (yellow card) 81'	Report	McGeehan 59'; Mowatt (yellow card) 75'; Lindsay (yellow card) 78'; Bähre (yellow card) 90+1'; Moore (yellow card) 90+5'	Stadium: Bloomfield Road; Attendance: 4,054; Referee: Anthony Backhouse

26 December 2018 23	Rochdale	2–1	Blackpool	Rochdale
15:00 GMT	Rathbone 19'; Camps (yellow card) 31'; Henderson 89'	Report	Thompson (red card) 30'; Nottingham 35'; O'Connor (yellow card) 77'	Stadium: Spotland Stadium; Attendance: 4,006; Referee: Thomas Bramall

29 December 2018 24	AFC Wimbledon	0–0	Blackpool	Kingston upon Thames
15:00 GMT	Appiah (yellow card) 64'; Wordsworth (yellow card) 86'	Report	Bola (yellow card) 61'	Stadium: Kingsmeadow; Attendance: 4,416; Referee: Dean Whitestone

1 January 2019 25	Blackpool	0–1	Sunderland	Blackpool
15:00 GMT	O'Connor (yellow card) 55'	Report	Cattermole (yellow card) 18'; Maja 23'; Gooch (yellow card) 55'	Stadium: Bloomfield Road; Attendance: 10,994; Referee: Darren Drysdale

12 January 2019 26	Portsmouth	0–1	Blackpool	Portsmouth
15:00 GMT		Report	Long 74'	Stadium: Fratton Park; Attendance: 18,403; Referee: Kevin Johnson

19 January 2019 27	Blackpool	0–0	Shrewsbury Town	Blackpool
15:00 GMT		Report		Stadium: Bloomfield Road; Attendance: 3,186; Referee: Eddie Ilderton

26 January 2019 28	Coventry City	0–2	Blackpool	Coventry
15:00 GMT		Report	Delfouneso 47' (yellow card) 70'; Gnanduillet 52'	Stadium: Ricoh Arena; Attendance: 9,786; Referee: Eddie Ilderton

29 January 2019 29	Blackpool	2–2	Wycombe Wanderers	Blackpool
19:45 GMT	Heneghan 50'; Pritchard 83' (pen.)	Report	Akinfenwa 12'; Jacobson 53' (yellow card) 66'; Allsop (yellow card) 69'	Stadium: Bloomfield Road; Attendance: 2,388; Referee: Martin Coy

2 February 2019 P	Accrington Stanley	P–P	Blackpool	Accrington
15:00 GMT		Report		Stadium: Crown Ground
Note: Fixture was postponed due to freezing weather overnight.

9 February 2019 30	Blackpool	2–0	Walsall	Blackpool
15:00 GMT	Long 14'; Pritchard 88'; Bola (yellow card) 90'	Report	Cook (yellow card) 73'	Stadium: Bloomfield Road; Attendance: 3,252; Referee: Thomas Bramall

12 February 2019 31	Sunderland	1–1	Blackpool	Sunderland
19:45 GMT	Baldwin 75'	Report	Gnanduillet 31'; Thompson (yellow card) 80'	Stadium: Stadium of Light; Attendance: 27,580; Referee: Carl Boyeson

16 February 2019 32	Charlton Athletic	0–0	Blackpool	Charlton
15:00 GMT	Taylor (yellow card) 41'	Report	Tilt (yellow card) 41'; Heneghan (yellow card) 44'	Stadium: The Valley; Attendance: 17,267; Referee: Kevin Johnson

23 February 2019 33	Blackpool	0–1	Oxford United	Blackpool
15:00 GMT	Tilt (yellow card) 36'; Spearing (yellow card) 39'; Heneghan (yellow card) 69'	Report	Graham 40'; Sinclair (yellow card) 77'; Ruffels (yellow card) 80'	Stadium: Bloomfield Road; Attendance: 4,003; Referee: Andy Haines

2 March 2019 34	Bristol Rovers	4–0	Blackpool	Horfield
15:00 GMT	Clarke-Harris 6', 37', 68'; Nichols (yellow card) 18'; Sercombe 90+1'	Report	Turton (yellow card) 15'	Stadium: Memorial Stadium; Attendance: 8,496; Referee: Darren Drysdale

5 March 2019 35	Accrington Stanley	1–2	Blackpool	Accrington
19:45 GMT	McConville (yellow card) 12'; Armstrong 23'; Donacien (yellow card) 73'; Evtimov (red card) 83'; Wood (yellow card) 88'; Hughes (yellow card) 90'	Report	Virtue 5'; Dodoo (yellow card) 30'; Spearing 81' (pen.)	Stadium: Crown Ground; Attendance: 3,792; Referee: Ross Joyce

9 March 2019 36	Blackpool	2–2	Southend United	Blackpool
15:00 GMT	Gnanduillet 27'; Long (yellow card) 76'; Moore 90+6' (o.g.)	Report	Kiernan 20'; Cox (yellow card) 36'; Turner 48'; Hyam (yellow card) 65'; Demetriou (yellow card) 66'	Stadium: Bloomfield Road; Attendance: 15,871; Referee: Christopher Sarginson

12 March 2019 37	Blackpool	1–1	Doncaster Rovers	Blackpool
19:45 GMT	Nottingham 49' (yellow card) 90+4'	Report	Rowe 73'	Stadium: Bloomfield Road; Attendance: 7,404; Referee: Peter Wright

16 March 2019 38	Burton Albion	3–0	Blackpool	Burton upon Trent
15:00 GMT	Boyce 6'; Allen 34'; Akins 68'	Report	Long (yellow card) 45+1'; Thompson (yellow card) 63'	Stadium: Pirelli Stadium; Attendance: 2,715; Referee: Anthony Backhouse

23 March 2019 39	Bradford City	1–4	Blackpool	Bradford
15:00 GMT	Akpan (yellow card) 42'; Doyle (penalty missed) 56'; O'Brien (yellow card) 83'; Ball 90+2'	Report	Spearing (yellow card) 23'; Gnanduillet 24', 68'; Tilt (yellow card) 39'; Virtue 50'; Mafoumbi (yellow card) 55'; Taylor 80'	Stadium: Valley Parade; Referee: Antony Coggins

30 March 2019 40	Blackpool	2–2	Plymouth Argyle	Blackpool
15:00 GMT	Gnanduillet (yellow card) 19'; Spearing (yellow card) 80'; Bola 84'; Tilt 90+2'	Report	Ladapo 4'; Carey (yellow card) 55'; Edwards 73'; Songo'o (yellow card) 77'	Stadium: Bloomfield Road; Attendance: 8,343; Referee: Sebastian Stockbridge

6 April 2019 41	Luton Town	2–2	Blackpool	Luton
15:00 BST	Collins 6' (yellow card) 59' (yellow-red card) 61'; Cummings 86'	Report	Kirby 30' (yellow card) 67'; Delfouneso (yellow card) 50'; Turton (yellow card) 54'; Virtue 62'; Long (yellow card) 90+6'	Stadium: Kenilworth Road; Attendance: 10,028; Referee: Lee Collins

13 April 2019 42	Blackpool	0–1	Peterborough United	Blackpool
15:00 BST	Tilt (yellow card) 90+2'	Report	Maddison 43'	Stadium: Bloomfield Road; Attendance: 7,477; Referee: Peter Wright

19 April 2019 43	Scunthorpe United	0–0	Blackpool	Scunthorpe
15:00 BST		Report		Stadium: Glanford Park; Attendance: 3,795; Referee: Martin Coy

22 April 2019 44	Blackpool	2–1	Fleetwood Town	Blackpool
15:00 BST	Spearing 31' (pen.); Thompson (yellow card) 57'; Delfouneso 90+4'	Report	Evans 37'; Eastham (yellow card) 67'; Sheron (red card) 72'; Hill (yellow card) 87'; Sowerby (yellow card) 90+6'	Stadium: Bloomfield Road; Attendance: 11,713; Referee: Darren Bond

27 April 2019 45	Barnsley	2–1	Blackpool	Barnsley
15:00 BST	Woodrow 40'; Lindsay 59'	Report	Pritchard 15'; Evans (yellow card) 58'	Stadium: Oakwell; Attendance: 14,703; Referee: John Busby

4 May 2019 46	Blackpool	0–3	Gillingham	Blackpool
17:30 BST	Tilt (yellow card) 86'; Mafoumbi (yellow card) 86'	Report	Hanlan 7'; Eaves 30', 39' (yellow card) 86'; Garmston (yellow card) 51'; Lopes (yellow card) 60'	Stadium: Bloomfield Road; Attendance: 9,571; Referee: Oliver Yates

=== FA Cup ===
The first round draw was made live on BBC by Dennis Wise and Dion Dublin on 22 October. The draw for the second round was made live on BBC and BT by Mark Schwarzer and Glenn Murray on 12 November. The third round draw was made live on BBC by Ruud Gullit and Paul Ince from Stamford Bridge on 3 December 2018.

10 November 2018 First round	Exeter City	2–3	Blackpool	Exeter
15:00 GMT	Tillson 69'; Abrahams 90'	Report	Dodoo 3'; Cullen 19'; Pritchard 24'	Stadium: St James Park; Attendance: 3,188; Referee: Alan Young

30 November 2018 Second round	Solihull Moors	0–0	Blackpool	Solihull
19:55 GMT		Report		Stadium: Damson Park; Attendance: 3,005; Referee: Ross Joyce

18 December 2018 Second round replay	Blackpool	3–2 (a.e.t.)	Solihull Moors	Blackpool
19:45 GMT	Gnanduillet 10' (yellow card) 78'; Dodoo 19'; Spearing 105' (pen.)	Report	Yussuf 33', 51' (pen.) (yellow card) 67'; Gudger (yellow card) 43'; Osborne (yellow card) 104'	Stadium: Bloomfield Road; Attendance: 1,441; Referee: Andy Haines

5 January 2019 Third round	Blackpool	0–3	Arsenal	Blackpool
17:30 GMT		Report	Willock 11', 37'; Kolašinac (yellow card) 56'; Iwobi 82'	Stadium: Bloomfield Road; Attendance: 8,955; Referee: Mike Dean

=== EFL Cup ===
On 15 June 2018, the draw for the first round was made in Vietnam. The second round draw was made from the Stadium of Light on 16 August. The third round draw was made on 30 August 2018 by David Seaman and Joleon Lescott. The fourth round draw was made live on Quest by Rachel Yankey and Rachel Riley on 29 September.

14 August 2018 First round	Blackpool	3–1	Barnsley	Blackpool
19:45 BST	Pritchard (yellow card) 46', (goal) 56'; Nottingham 50'; Gnaduillet 80'; Tilt (yellow card) 89'	Report	Moncur 19'; Dougall (yellow card) 28'; Walton (yellow card) 79'	Stadium: Bloomfield Road; Attendance: 1,937; Referee: Mark Heywood

28 August 2018 Second round	Doncaster Rovers	1–2	Blackpool	Doncaster
19:45 BST	May 23'	Report	Nottingham 38'; Pritchard 60'	Stadium: Keepmoat Stadium; Attendance: 3,188; Referee: Anthony Backhouse

25 September 2018 Third round	Blackpool	2–0	Queens Park Rangers	Blackpool
19:45 BST	Gnanduillet 28'; Spearing 90'	Report	Cousins (red card) 70'	Stadium: Bloomfield Road; Attendance: 1,910; Referee: Tim Robinson

30 October 2018 Fourth round	Arsenal	2–1	Blackpool	Holloway
19:45 BST	Lichtsteiner 33'; Rowe 50'; Guendouzi (red card) 56'	Report	O'Connor 66' (red card) 84'	Stadium: Emirates Stadium; Attendance: 48,168; Referee: David Coote

=== EFL Trophy ===
On 13 July 2018, the initial group stage draw bar the U21 invited clubs was announced.

Pos	Lge	Team	Pld	W	PW	PL	L	GF	GA	GD	Pts	Qualification
1	L1	Accrington Stanley	3	2	0	0	1	8	5	+3	6	Round 2
2	L2	Macclesfield Town	3	1	1	0	1	6	8	−2	5	Round 2
3	L1	Blackpool	3	1	0	1	1	7	7	0	4	
4	ACA	West Bromwich Albion U21	3	1	0	0	2	4	5	−1	3	

Source: EFL.com

4 September 2018 Group stages	Macclesfield Town	3–3 (5–3 p)	Blackpool	Macclesfield
19:45 BST	Blissett 14'; Rose 36', 79' (pen.)	Report	Guy 32'; O'Sullivan 90+1'; O'Connor 90+5'	Stadium: Moss Rose; Attendance: 639; Referee: Chris Sarginson
	Penalties
	Whitaker (penalty scored); Smith (penalty scored); Fitzpatrick (penalty scored); Smith (penalty scored); Rose (penalty scored)		Pritchard (penalty scored); Taylor (penalty scored); Heneghan (penalty scored); Bola (penalty missed)

9 October 2018 Group stages	Blackpool	1–2	West Bromwich Albion U21	Blackpool
19:45 BST	Davies 45'	Report	Azaz 3'; Bradley 76'	Stadium: Bloomfield Road; Attendance: 717

13 November 2018 Group stages	Blackpool	3–2	Accrington Stanley	Blackpool
19:45 GMT	Dodoo 30', 41'; Gnanduillet 67'	Report	Hall 17', 90+1' (pen.)	Stadium: Bloomfield Road

== Summary ==
Games played	35 (24 League One, 3 FA Cup, 4 League Cup, 3 League Trophy)
Games won	15 (9 League One, 2 FA Cup, 3 League Cup, 1 League Trophy)
Games drawn	9 (8 League One, 1 FA Cup, 0 League Cup, 0 League Trophy)
Games lost	11 (8 League One, 0 FA Cup, 1 League Cup, 2 League Trophy)
Goals scored	47 (26 League One, 6 FA Cup, 8 League Cup, 7 League Trophy)
Goals conceded	40 (25 League One, 4 FA Cup, 4 League Cup, 7 League Trophy)
Goal difference	+7
Clean sheets	12 (10 League One, 1 FA Cup, 1 League Cup, 0 League Trophy)
Yellow cards	39 (26 League One, 4 FA Cup, 6 League Cup, 3 League Trophy)
Red cards	5 (5 League One, 0 FA Cup, 0 League Cup, 0 League Trophy)
Worst Discipline	Paudie O'Connor (5 (yellow card) , 0 (yellow card) (yellow-red card) , 1 (red card) )
Best result	3–0 vs. Burton Albion (24 Nov 18)
Worst result	3–0 vs. Bristol Rovers (3 Nov 18)
Most appearances	Jay Spearing (30 starts, 0 subs)
Top scorer	Armand Gnanduillet (9)
Points	35
