= Rowan Roache =

Irish association footballer

Personal information
- Full name: Rowan Gerald Roache
- Date of birth: 9 February 2000 (age 26)
- Position: Forward

Youth career
- ?– 2014: Manchester United
- 2014–2018: Blackpool

Senior career*
Years	Team	Apps	(Gls)
2016–2020	Blackpool	1	(0)
2017	→ Southport (loan)	1	(0)
2018	→ FC United of Manchester (loan)	1	(0)
2019	→ Lancaster City (loan)	7	(1)
2019–2020	→ Bamber Bridge (loan)	5	(2)
2020	Bamber Bridge	10	(0)
2020–2021	Altrincham	0	(0)
2021	Workington	7	(3)
2021–2022	Atherton Collieries	6	(0)
2022	Chester	13	(0)
2022–2023	Bamber Bridge	15	(0)

International career
2016	Republic of Ireland U16	2	(1)
2016–2017	Republic of Ireland U17	9	(3)
2017	Republic of Ireland U18	2	(0)
2018–2019	Republic of Ireland U19	5	(1)
- * Club domestic league appearances and goals as of 22:43, 30 November 2023 (UTC)

Rowan Gerald Roache (born 9 February 2000) is an Irish footballer who plays for Bamber Bridge. He also represents the Republic of Ireland, for whom he has appeared at four youth levels.

== Youth career ==
Roache joined Blackpool aged 14, playing for the club's youth teams. In 2016–17 he was part of the club's double-winning youth team and scored 30 goals in 31 matches, with 20 assists for the side.

== Club career ==
Roache made his first-team debut for Blackpool in the EFL Cup in December 2016. In June 2017 he signed his first professional contract with in June 2017, a two-year contract with an option for a third year. He made his league debut on 13 January 2018 v Bristol Rovers. He joined Southport on loan in August 2017. He was recalled by Blackpool at the end of the month and appeared for them on 29 August in an EFL Cup match against Wigan.

He was described as the "star man" as Blackpool reached the semi-finals of the 2017-18 FA Youth Cup before losing to Arsenal.

In November 2018 he joined F.C. United of Manchester on loan.

In January 2019 he joined Derby County U23s on loan until the end of the season.

In September 2019 he joined Lancaster City on a short-term loan. In December he again went out on loan, this time to Bamber Bridge.

Roache was released by Blackpool on 17 January 2020, but he remained a Bamber Bridge player.

He joined Altrincham in autumn 2020. He made his only appearance for Altrincham as a used substitute in the Cheshire Senior Cup but was twice named on the bench for league games without getting on the pitch. He was last named in a squad on Boxing Day 2020.

He started the 2021–22 season at Workington, scoring three goals in eight appearances in all competitions before joining Atherton Collieries in November 2021 where he made five appearances. In February 2022 he signed for Chester.

== International career ==
Having previously played for the Republic of Ireland national under-16 football team, in the 2016–17 season he was promoted to the Republic of Ireland national under-17 football team and played in nine of the ten matches that season, scoring three goals. This included four appearances at the 2017 UEFA European Under-17 Championship where he scored one goal.

He was named in the squad for the Republic of Ireland national under-18 football team in November 2017.

He was called up to the Republic of Ireland national under-19 football team in February 2018, making his debut and gaining his second cap in both matches against Romania. After injuries in summer of 2018 he was recalled to the squad in February 2019 playing in a friendly against an Irish league side.
