= Cane =

Cane or caning may refer to:

- Walking stick, or walking cane, a device used primarily to aid walking
- Assistive cane, a walking stick used as a mobility aid for better balance
- White cane, a mobility or safety device usually used by blind or visually impaired people
- An implement used in caning, a form of corporal punishment
- Sugarcane
- Cane (surname)

== Plants ==
- Cane (grass), tall perennial grasses with woody stalks
  - Arundo, Old World canes
  - Arundinaria, New World canes
  - Arundo donax, giant cane
  - Arundinaria appalachiana, hill cane
- Cane (vine), the part of a grapevine that supports the new growth
- Cane ash, the white ash tree, Fraxinus americana
- Cane cholla, Cylindropuntia imbricata, a cactus

== Animals ==
- Cane beetle, Dermolepida albohirtum, a pest of sugarcane, native to Australia
- Cane Corso, an Italian Mastiff
- Cane mouse, Zygodontomys, a rodent from Central and South America
- Cane rat, Thryonomys, a large rodent native to Africa
- Cane spider, the Brown Huntsman Spider, Heteropoda venatoria, native to the Caribbean
- Cane toad, Rhinella marina, native to Latin America
- Cane turtle, Vijayachelys silvatica, native to the Cochin Forest, India

== Places ==
- Cane, La Paz, Honduras
- Cane, U.S. Virgin Islands, a settlement on the island of Saint Croix
- Cane River (disambiguation), various rivers or other places
- Canë, also Qana', an old name for the Yemeni port of Mukalla

== People ==
- Cane (surname)
- Cané (born 1939), Jarbas Faustinho, Brazilian football manager and former winger
- Cane (musician) (born Zoran Kostić, 1964), Serbian rock musician
- Cane Broome (born 1994), American basketball player
- Canes (mythology), king of Phocis
- Cora Cané (1923–2016), Argentine journalist and writer
- Facino Cane – Italian condottiero (1360–1412)
- Hozan Canê (born 1971), Kurdish singer
- Humberto Cané (1913–2000), Cuban musician
- Luiz Cané (born 1981), Brazilian mixed martial artist
- Miguel Cané (1851–1905), Argentine writer
- Miguel Cané (actor) (born 1974), Mexican actor
- Paolo Canè (born 1965), Italian tennis player

== Entertainment and the arts ==
- Caning (film), 1979 Hong Kong crime drama film
- Cane (novel), 1923 novel by Jean Toomer
- Cane (TV series), an American television show
- Cane Ashby, a character on The Young and the Restless

== Sports ==
- Cane Pace, a horse racing competition
- Carolina Hurricanes, a National Hockey League team based in Raleigh, North Carolina, nicknamed the 'Canes
- Miami Hurricanes, the athletic teams of the University of Miami, nicknamed the 'Canes

== Other uses ==
- Caning (furniture), weaving chair seats and other furniture out of cane, wicker, or rattan
- Candy cane, a confection
- Cane gun, a gun disguised as a walking cane
- Cane sword, a cane with a blade inside
- Caneworking, a style of glassblowing
- CanE, an abbreviation of Canadian English
- CANE, the Classical Association of New England
- Raising Cane's Chicken Fingers, an American fast-food chain
- Cano, a Coahuiltecan tribe sometimes spelled Cane

== See also ==
- Cain (disambiguation)
- Caine (disambiguation)
- Cains (disambiguation)
- Canebrake (disambiguation)
- Caner (disambiguation)
- Du Cane (disambiguation)
- Kain (disambiguation)
- Kane (disambiguation)
- Caen, a commune in northwestern France
- Ó Catháin, an Irish surname sometimes anglicized as Kane
- Canes Venatici, a constellation sometimes shortened to just "Canes"
