= Cain (disambiguation) =

Cain is the first son of Adam and Eve in the Bible.

Cain may also refer to:

== People ==
- Cain (surname)
- Cain (given name)

== Arts and entertainment ==
=== Fictional characters ===
- Cain, the decoy assassin in Robert Ludlum's The Bourne Identity
- Cain, the Green Planet mage from The King of Braves GaoGaiGar
- Cain, main antagonist from the 1990 film RoboCop 2
- Cain and Abel (comics), most notably seen in The Sandman series and House of Mystery
- Cain Dingle, on the soap opera Emmerdale
- Cain C. Hargreaves, a character from Kaori Yuki's manga: Godchild
- Cain Marko, the Marvel character Juggernaut
- Cassandra Cain, the DC Comics character Batgirl
- Ciaphas Cain, from the Warhammer 40,000 universe
- Cogliostro, born as Cain, brother and killer of Abel, a supporting character in Todd McFarlane's Spawn comic series
- Commander Cain, of the Battlestar Pegasus in Battlestar Galactica
- David Cain (character), father of the DC Comics character Batgirl/Cassandra Cain
- Deckard Cain, in the Diablo video game franchise
- Strider Cain, from the Strider franchise; See Strider Hiryu
- Caine, from The Amazing Digital Circus. Theories relate him to the biblical Cain, which has been referenced (and mocked) by the show

=== Other arts and entertainment ===
- Cain (American band), a Christian country band
- Cain (Italian band), a black metal band
- Cain (novel), the final novel by Nobel Prize-winning author José Saramago
- Cain (play), an 1821 play by Lord Byron
- Cain (1918 film), a German silent film
- Caín (film), a 1984 Colombian drama
- Caïn (TV series), a French police procedural
- Cain (role-playing game)
- Cain Culto, stage name of American singer Andrew Padilla
- Cain, 1880 painting by Fernand Cormon

== Geography ==
- Mount Cain, Vancouver Island, British Columbia, Canada
- River Cain, Powys, Wales
- Cain Mountain, Nevada, United States - see Cain Mountain Wilderness
- Caín River, Puerto Rico, United States
- Cain Creek, South Dakota, United States
- Cain Nunatak, Trinity Peninsula, Antarctica

== Other uses ==
- Cain (software), network packet analyzing software
- Conflict Archive on the Internet (CAIN), a website documenting the Troubles in Northern Ireland
- Cain (company), a privately held real estate investment firm
- Cain's Ballroom, a music venue in Tulsa, Oklahoma, US
- Cain, a cigar brand made by Oliva Cigar Co.
- Cain baronets, an extinct title in the Baronetage of the United Kingdom

== See also ==
- Search for "Cain"
- Cain City, Texas, United States, a ghost town
- Cain House (disambiguation)
- Cain Manor, an Elizabethan building in Headley, Hampshire, England
- Cain v. Universal Pictures Co., a 1942 American copyright law case
- Caïn (disambiguation)
- Caine (disambiguation)
- Cains (disambiguation)
- Cane (disambiguation)
- Cayne (disambiguation)
- Kain (disambiguation)
- Kane (disambiguation)
