= Kain (surname) =

Kain is a surname that is German, Jewish and Scottish. Notable people with the surname include:

- Adria Kain, African-Canadian singer
- Alfred Kain (1927–2010), Austrian cyclist
- Andy Kain (born 1985), English rugby league player
- Bob Kain, American businessman
- Conrad Kain (1883–1934), Austrian mountain guide
- Edgar Kain (1918–1940), New Zealand fighter ace of WWII
- Eugenie Kain (1960–2010), Austrian writer
- Frances Ida Kain (1908–1997), New Zealand dietitian and women’s air force leader
- Franz Kain (1922–1997), Austrian writer and politician
- Gabriella Kain (born 1981), Swedish handball player
- Gylan Kain, African-American poet and playwright
- Joanna M. Kain (1930–2017), New Zealand phycologist, marine biologist and driver
- John Kain (rugby league), British rugby league player
- John F. Kain (1935–2003), American economist
- John Joseph Kain (1841–1903), American Roman Catholic archbishop
- Joseph Kain (1854–1907), American politician and businessman
- Karen Kain (born 1951), Canadian dancer
- Kevin Kain, Canadian tropical disease expert
- Khalil Kain (born 1968), African-American actor and rapper
- Marty Kain (born 1988), New Zealand cricketer
- Roger Kain, British geographer
- Saul Kain, pen name of Siegfried Sassoon (1886–1967), English poet, writer, and soldier
- Sutter Kain (born 1944), African-American rapper and music producer
- Thomas Kain (1907–1971), American baseball pitcher
- Tom Kain (born 1963), American soccer player and businessman

== See also ==
- Kain (given name)
- Kain (disambiguation)
