= Cane (surname) =

Cane is a surname. Notable people with the surname include:

- Andrew Cane (fl. 1602–1650), English actor
- Anthony Cane (born 1961), English Anglican priest
- Arnold J. Cane (1914–1968), American lawyer, jurist, and legislator
- Ben Cane, Australian winemaker
- Bill Cane (1911–1987), Australian plantsman
- Carlo Cane (1618–1688), Italian painter
- Clay Cane, American political commentator
- Daniel Cane, CEO of Blackboard
- David E. Cane (born 1944), American biological chemist
- Facino Cane (1360–1412), Italian condottiero
- Felix Cane (born 1984), Australian pole dancer
- Florence Cane (1882–1952), American art educator
- George Cane (1881–1968), British diver
- Hilary Cane (born 1949), planetary scientist
- Jacob Cane (born 1994), English footballer
- Jordan Cane (born 2001), British racing driver
- Lucy Cane (c. 1866 – 1926), Irish public servant
- Mark Cane, American climate scientist
- Melville Henry Cane (1879–1980), American poet and lawyer
- Percy Stephen Cane (1881–1976), English garden designer and writer
- Robert Cane (1807–1858), Irish political activist
- Rudolph C. Cane (born 1934), American politician
- Sam Cane (born 1992), New Zealand rugby player
- Sandy Cane (born 1961), Italian politician
- Santiago Cane Jr., Filipino politician
- Scott Cane, Australian archaeologist and anthropologist
- Thomas Cane, Wisconsin judge
- Tina Cane, American poet and activist

== See also ==
- Cane (disambiguation)
