= Kane (given name) =

The given name Kane is shared by:

== In arts and media ==
=== Music ===
- Kane Alexander, Australian jazz and classical singer
- Kane Beatz (born 1986), American record producer and songwriter
- Kane Brown (born 1993), American country music singer
- Kane Churko (born 1986), Canadian record producer
- Kane Ian, Singapore-based DJ and musician
- Kane Kalas (born 1989), American poker player, singer, and broadcaster
- Kane O'Hara (1711/1712–1782), Irish composer and playwright
- Kane Roberts (born 1962), American heavy metal guitarist
- Kane Strang, New Zealand musician from Dunedin
- Kane West (a.k.a. Gus Lobban), Kero Kero Bonito member and solo electronic music producer

=== Other arts ===
- Kane (wrestler) (born 1967), American politician and professional wrestler
- Kane Hodder (born 1955), American actor and stuntman
- Kane Kalas (born 1989), American poker player, singer, and broadcaster
- Kane Kosugi (born 1974), American actor and martial artist of Japanese and Chinese descent
- Kane Parsons (a.k.a. Kane Pixels, born 2005), British-American filmmaker, musician, YouTuber, and VFX artist, known for his The Backrooms YouTube videos
- Kane Richmond (1906–1973), American film actor
- Kane W. Lynn (1919–1975), American film producer

== In sports ==
=== Australian-rules football ===
- Kane Cornes (born 1983), Australian-rules footballer
- Kane Farrell (born 1999), Australian-rules footballer
- Kane Fraser (born 1977), former Australian-rules footballer
- Kane Johnson (born 1978), former Australian-rules footballer
- Kane Lambert (born 1991), former Australian-rules footballer
- Kane Lucas (born 1991), former Australian-rules footballer
- Kane Mitchell (born 1989), former Australian-rules footballer
- Kane Munro (born 1982), Australian-rules footballer

=== Football (soccer) ===
- Kane Ashcroft (1986–2015), English footballer who played for York City
- Kane Crichlow (born 2000), Bermudian footballer
- Kane Ferdinand (born 1992), Irish footballer
- Kane Haysman (born 1995), English footballer
- Kane Hemmings (born 1992), English professional footballer
- Kane Smith (born 1996), English professional footballer
- Kane Vincent-Young (born 1996), English professional footballer
- Kane Wilson (born 2000), English professional footballer

=== Rugby ===
==== Australia ====
- Kane Bradley (born 2000), Australian professional rugby league footballer
- Kane Cleal (born 1987), Australian rugby league footballer
- Kane Douglas (born 1989), Australian professional rugby union footballer
- Kane Elgey (born 1994), (a.k.a. "LG"), Australian former professional rugby league footballer
- Kane Evans (born 1992), Australian rugby league footballer
- Kane Koteka (born 1994), Australian rugby union player
- Kane Morgan (born 1990), Australian former professional rugby league footballer

==== New Zealand ====
- Kane Barrett (born 1990), New Zealand rugby union footballer
- Kane Bentley (born 1987), New Zealand rugby league footballer
- Kane Falconer (born 1997), Australian-born New Zealand rugby union player
- Kane Ferris (born 1984), New Zealand rugby league player
- Kane Hames (born 1988), New Zealand former rugby union player
- Kane Thompson (born 1982), New Zealand-born rugby union coach and former player

==== Other countries ====
- Kane Epati (born 1981), Samoan-born English former semi-professional rugby league footballer
- Kane Le'aupepe (born 1992), New Zealand-born Samoan former rugby union player
- Kane Linnett (born 1989), Australian-born Scottish international rugby league footballer
- Kane Palma-Newport (born 1990), English rugby union player
- Kane Thompson (born 1982), New Zealand-born rugby union coach and former player

=== Other sports ===
- Kane Avellano (born 1993), British adventurer and long distance motorcycle rider
- Kane Brigg (born 1988), Australian high jumper and triple jumper
- Kane Davis (born 1975), American former professional baseball pitcher
- Kane Ioane (born 1982), American college football coach and former player
- Kane Lafranchise (born 1988), Canadian former professional ice hockey player
- Kane Radford (born 1990), New Zealand swimmer
- Kane Richardson (born 1991), Australian international cricketer
- Kane Russell (born 1992), New Zealand field hockey player
- Kane Tucker (born 2000), Irish amateur boxer
- Kane Waselenchuk (born 1981), Canadian racquetball player
- Kane Webber (born 1980), Australian professional golfer
- Kane Williamson (born 1990), New Zealand cricketer
- Kane Wommack (born 1987), American football coach and former player

== In other fields ==
- Kane Hamidou Baba (1954–2021), Mauritanian politician
- Kane Kramer (born 1956), British inventor and businessman
- Kane S. Yee (born 1934), Chinese-American electrical engineer and mathematician
- Kane Tanaka (1903–2022), Japanese supercentenarian
- Kane William Horneck (1726–1753), officer in the Royal Engineers

== Fictional characters ==
- Kane Jenkins, on the New Zealand soap opera Shortland Street
- Kane Phillips, on the Australian soap opera Home and Away

== See also ==
- Kane (disambiguation)#People
