= Cains =

Cains can refer to:

== People ==
- Bev Cains (born 1938), Australian politician
- Carole Cains (born 1943), Australian politician
- Harriet Cains (born 1993), British actress

== Places ==
- Cains River, New Brunswick, Canada
- Cains Creek, Missouri, United States

== Other uses ==
- Cains (law firm), a law firm on the Isle of Man
- Cains Brewery, a former brewery in Liverpool, England
- CAINS (Clinical Assessment Interview for Negative Symptoms) in schizophrenia

== See also ==
- Cain's Ballroom, a music venue in Tulsa, Oklahoma, United States
- Cain (disambiguation)
- Caine (disambiguation)
- Caines
