= Cane River (disambiguation) =

Cane River is a river formed from a portion of the Red River that is located in Natchitoches Parish, Louisiana, United States.

Cane River may also refer to:

== Rivers ==
- Cane River (Jamaica)
- Cane River (North Carolina), United States
- Cane River (Western Australia), in the Pilbara region

== Other uses ==
- Cane River, North Carolina, an unincorporated community in Yancey County
- Cane River (novel), a 2001 historical novel by Lalita Tademy
- Cane River (film), a 1982 film by Horace B. Jenkins

== See also ==
- Cane (disambiguation)
- Cane River Lake, a lake formed from a portion of the Red River in Natchitoches Parish, Louisiana
- Cane Creek (disambiguation)
