= Caine =

Caine may refer to:

== People ==
- Caine (surname), a name (including a list of people with the surname)

== Fictional characters ==
- Caine, a character and the main antagonist from the animated series The Amazing Digital Circus
- Caine Soren, a character in the novel series Gone by Michael Grant
- Caine, an alternate spelling of the biblical Cain, and mythical first Vampire in the World of Darkness fictional universe
- Caine, the antihero of the Heroes Die novel written by Matthew Stover
- Caine the Longshot, a character in the manga and anime series Trigun
- Caine, one of Corwin's brothers in The Chronicles of Amber series of fantasy novels
- Horatio Caine, from the CSI: Miami television series
- Kwai Chang Caine, a Shaolin monk from the Kung Fu television series
- Caine "Kaydee" Lawson, the main character in Menace II Society film
- Solomon Caine, a character in the Driver video game franchise
- U.S.S. Caine, fictional ship of The Caine Mutiny franchise

== Places ==
- La Caine, a commune in Basse-Normandie, France
- Río Caine, a river in Bolivia

== Other uses ==
- Caine Prize, for African Writing
- CAINE Linux, a digital forensics Linux distribution
- Caine (film), an action thriller film in the John Wick franchise
- Caine, a person featured in the Holy Bible.

== See also ==
- Cane (disambiguation)
- Cain (disambiguation)
- Kaine (surname)
- Kaine (disambiguation)
- Kain (disambiguation)
- Kane (disambiguation)
