= Rhode Island Center for the Book =

- Formation: 2003
- Location: 514 Bellevue Ave, Newport, Rhode Island
- Coordinates: 41.4676226°N 71.308123°W
- Website: ribook.org

The Rhode Island Center for the Book is a non-profit organization and an affiliate of the National Center for the Book at the Library of Congress. Founded in 2003, the organization "promoting personal and community enrichment by celebrating the art and heritage of reading, writing, making, and sharing books." The center runs a number of book- and reading-related programs, including Reading Across Rhode Island and Kids Reading Across Rhode Island, an annual initiative that encourages Rhode Islanders across the state to read and discuss one book, by providing books and programing; and the Youth Poetry Initiative, which is supported by Rhode Island Poet Laureate Tina Cane. The center also maintains a membership program.

The Rhode Island Center for the book resides within the Pell Center for International Relations and Diplomacy at Salve Regina University. It was hosted by, and continues to be supported by, the Rhode Island Council for the Humanities.
