= Faine =

Faine is a surname. Notable people with the surname include:

- Jeff Faine (born 1981), American football player
- Jon Faine (born 1956), Australian radio presenter
- Parker Faine, character in Strangers (Dean Koontz novel)

== See also ==
- Haine (surname)
- Kaine (surname)
