= Kaine (surname) =

Kaine is a surname. Notable people with the surname include:

- Bill Kaine (1900–1968), English professional footballer
- Carmel Kaine (1937–2013), Australian classical violinist
- Jaiden Kaine, Cuban-American actor
- John Charles Kaine (1854–1923), Quebec politician
- Laurie Kaine (born 1952), Australian rules footballer
- Les Kaine (1936–2012), Australian rules footballer
- Obregon Kaine, main character in the comic book series Negation
- Tim Kaine (born 1958), American politician and 2016 Democratic Party vice presidential nominee
- Trevor Kaine (1928–2008), Australian politician
- Whitney Kaine (born 1956), American model

== See also ==
- Kaine (disambiguation)
- Kane (disambiguation)
- Caine (disambiguation)
