= Bertolé =

Bertolé is an Argentinian surname. Notable people with this surname include:

- Cora María Bertolé de Cané (1923–2016), Argentinian journalist, librettist, and writer
- Emilia Bertolé (1896–1949), Argentinian poet and painter

== See also ==
- Bertoli
