= Konrad Deubler =

Austrian philosopher and farmer (1814–1884)

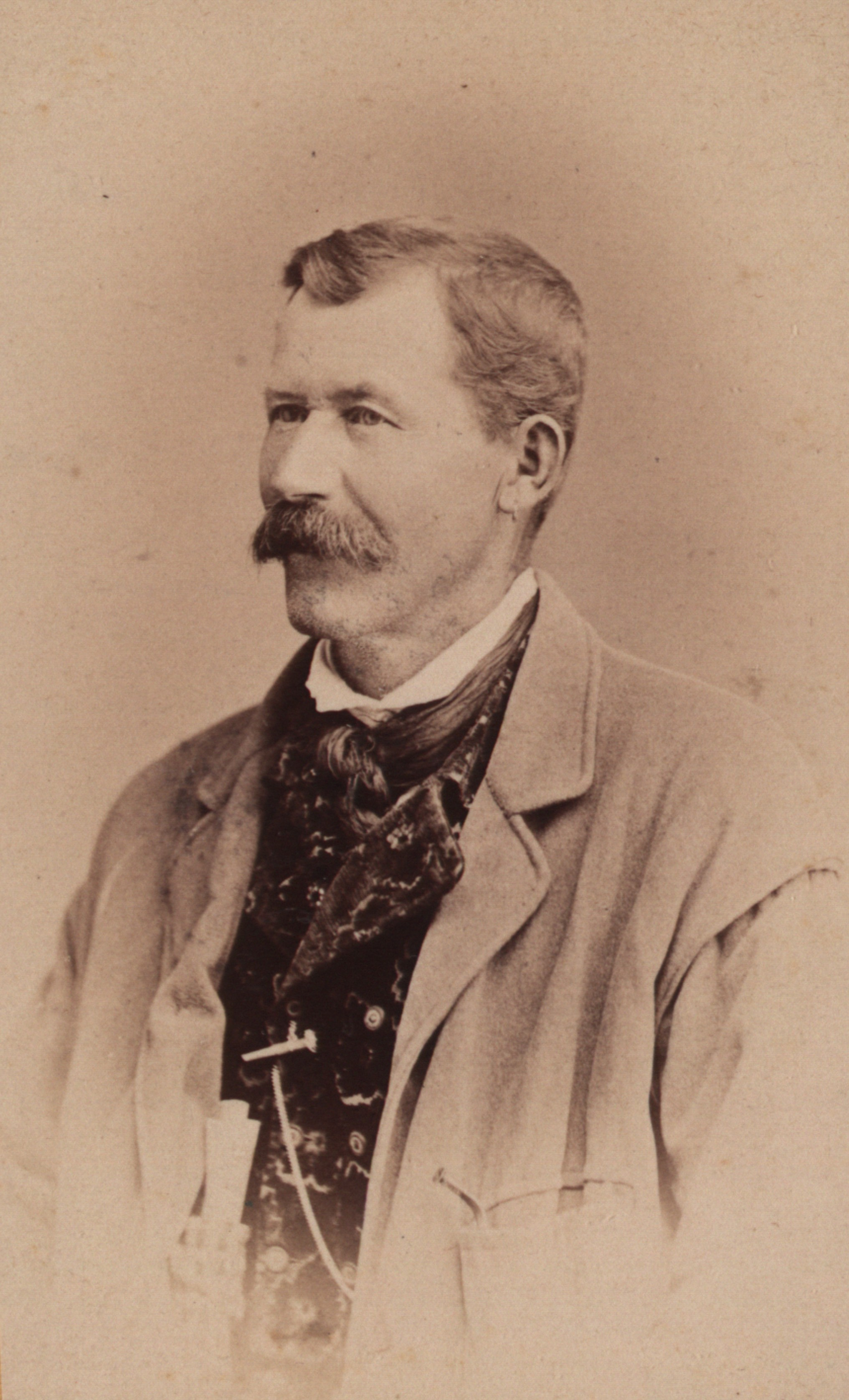
Photograph by Viktor Angerer, 1871

Konrad Deubler, nicknamed "The Peasant Philosopher" (26 November 1814 – 31 March 1884), was an Austrian farmer, baker, innkeeper, and politician.

== Life ==
=== Early life ===
Konrad Deubler was born on 26 November 1814 in Goisern, Austria. He was the son of Leopold Deubler (1779–1852), a miner and farmer, and Anna Schenner (1780–1860). He learned the trade of miller, and simultaneously found time to pursue his studies. In his youth, he travelled to Vienna, Venice and Dresden, broadening his horizons. On his return to Austria in 1853, his support for and active promulgation of Enlightenment ideas and of writings critical of religion led to his arrest and the confiscation of his books.

Deubler justified himself by claiming he had sold all these books to several families who had emigrated to America just before his arrest. After a year and a half of provisional detention, he was condemned to two years of penal labor in Brno for treason and religious disturbance. He was also interned in Olomouc, and was unable to return to his homeland for four years. In 1857, he was pardoned by Emperor Franz Joseph I, but was exiled again from 1862 to 1864. After his liberation, he traveled to Nuremberg to visit Ludwig Feuerbach, whom he admired. Feuerbach later visited Goisern for several months; the two men became friends, and Deubler visited Feuerbach in Rechenberg just before the latter's death in 1872. Deubler was elected mayor of Goisern for the years 1870-71.

=== A self-taught philosopher ===
Deubler was a gifted autodidact and found the necessary drive to teach himself in the free time that his work permitted him. He derived his philosophy of life from the works of Ludwig Feuerbach, Ludwig Pfau, David Friedrich Strauss, Eugen Dühring, Ernst Haeckel, Ludwig Anzengruber and others, with whom he maintained a correspondence, and whom he reciprocally visited and invited to visit his home town of Goisern. He always strove to disseminate his knowledge among the ordinary people of his community. Thus, having read Strauss' two-volume work Das Leben Jesu kritisch Bearbeitung* (published in 1835/36), he wrote to the author to suggest that he create an abridged popular edition, a suggestion that Strauss took, publishing Das Leben Jesu. Leicht faßliche Bearbeitung *, which appeared later in 1864 under the title * Das Leben Jesu für das deutsche Volk. A notable close friendship developed between Deubler and Ludwig Feuerbach, thanks to a sustained correspondence and mutual visits. After the death of Feuerbach in 1872, Deubler turned to Ernst Haeckel as a source of intellectual inspiration. He was also in contact with Peter Rosegger and the writer Minna Kautsky, mother of the Marxist theorist Karl Kautsky.

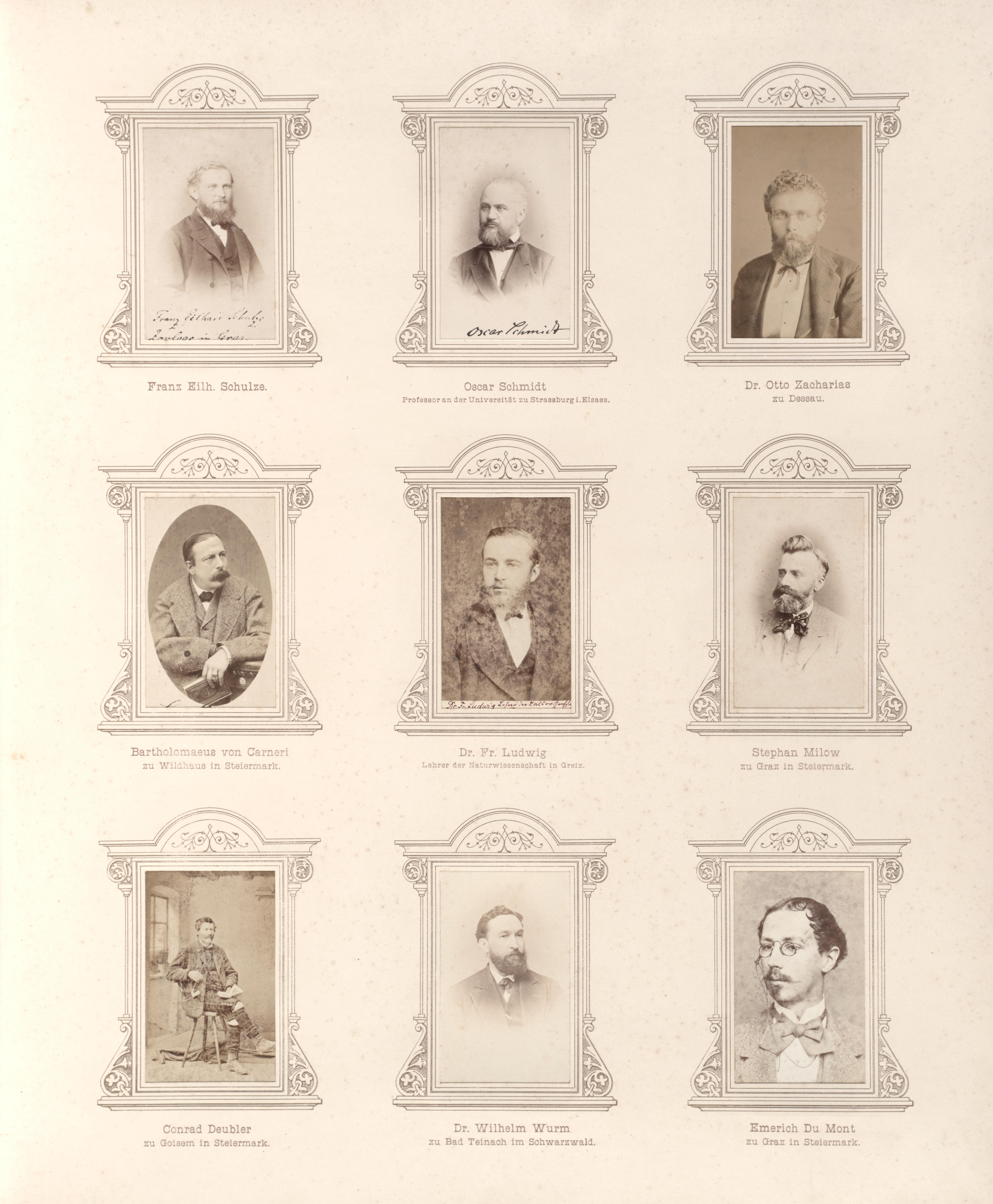
Conrad Deubler (lower left) in the 1877 Darwin Album - page 11

He openly professed his support for Darwinism and contributed to the gift offered to Darwin by his German disciples on his 69th birthday: a photograph album richly decorated with silver and gold.

Deubler's reading included, among other works:

- Henry Thomas Buckle: Geschichte der Civilisation in England
- Ludwig Feuerbach: Wesen des Christenthums, Gedanken über Tod und Unsterblichkeit
- Eugen Dühring: Wert des Lebens
- Ernst Haeckel: Natürliche Schöpfungs-Geschichte
- Ludwig Pfau: Freie Studien
- Alexander von Humboldt: Ansichten der Natur
- Jakob Moleschott
- Christian Radenhausen: Isis – Der Mensch und die Welt
- Peter Rosegger
- Emil Adolf Roßmäßler: Der Mensch im Spiegel der Natur, Zeitschrift Aus der Heimath.
- Friedrich Schiller
- David Friedrich Strauß: Das Leben Jesu kritisch bearbeitet
- Otto Ule
- Carl Vogt

He was always interested in the intellectual edification of the common people. Despite the narrowness of the reigning ideas in his remote town, he perceived the intellectual upheavals of his time and spread awareness of them. He defended free thinking for the entirety of his life. It is astonishing to see to what degree he managed to teach himself despite the simplicity of his environment and his limited means. That said, his letters to Haeckel and others reveal a lack of critical thinking towards these authors and their theories. Thanks to his efforts, a secular school was founded in Goisern. Konrad Deubler wrote several poems and left behind an autobiography.

After Deubler's death in 1884, one of his friends, the Zurich botanist Arnold Dodel-Port, published a call to his friends and acquaintances in numerous German-speaking newspapers, in order to gather his scattered correspondence for posterity. Dodel-Port honored Deubler's memory by publishing a work in two volumes, entitled: Konrad Deubler. Tagebücher, Biographie und Briefwechsel ein literarisches Denkmal.

Konrad Deubler married twice. In 1833 he married Eleonora Gamsjäger (1813–1875), and in 1876 he married Anna Kefer (1828–1900). He had no children.

== Legacy ==
Konrad Deubler is considered as a pioneer among the atheists and freethinkers of Upper Austria. His pedagogical approach has formed a model for future generations of atheists. Three symposiums on Konrad Deubler were organized between 1997 and 1999 through collaboration between the Austrian Association of Freethinkers and the municipality of Bad Goisern.

By 1904, the Konrad-Deubler-Gasse in Graz, the Deublerstraße in Linz and the Deublergasse in Vienna-Floridsdorf bore his name. In 1934, in Steyr, what is now Schosserstraße was still called Konrad-Deubler-Straße.

On the occasion of the Festival of Global Heritage 2014, the Konrad Deubler monument, situated in the gardens of Bad Goisern and designed by Paul Riedmann, a student at the HTBLA School of Sculpture in Hallstatt, was dedicated.

In 2014, the Austrian National Library in Vienna acquired Konrad Deubler's nachlass. This collection notably includes his original correspondence with Ludwig Feuerbach, Ernst Haeckel, Eugen Dühring et Ludwig Anzengruber, documents relating to his free-thinking and political activities, and fragments of his writings and personal journals.

In the city of Werfenweng, in Salzbourg, is the Konrad-Deubler-Heim, a group accommodation for schools, businesses, and clubs.

In her travel narrative Black Lamb and Grey Falcon, Rebecca West ascribes guilt for the imprisonment of Konrad Deubler to Archduchess Sophie of Austria, while enumerating the latter's crimes.

== Bibliography ==
- Minna Kautsky: Konrad Deubler. In: Die Neue Zeit. Revue des geistigen und öffentlichen Lebens. 4. Jg. (1886), Heft 10, S. 465–474 (Digitalisat [fes.de]).
- Arnold Dodel-Port: Konrad Deubler, der monistische Philosoph im Bauernkittel. Sein Entwicklungsgang vom einfältigen Glauben zum klaren Erkennen. Stuttgart 1909.
- Arnold Dodel-Port (Hrsg.): Konrad Deubler. Tagebücher, Biographie und Briefwechsel des oberösterreichischen Bauernphilosophen. 2 Teile, Verlag B. Elischer, Leipzig 1886.
- Leo Gabriel (1957). "Deubler, Konrad". Neue Deutsche Biographie (in German). Vol. 3. Berlin: Duncker & Humblot. pp. 620–621. (full text online).
- "Deubler Konrad". In: Österreichisches Biographisches Lexikon 1815–1950 (ÖBL). Vol. 1, Austrian Academy of Sciences, Vienna 1957, p. 181.
- (de) Fr. Hfm. (= Friedrich Hofmann), Der Bauernphilosoph von Goisern : Die Gartenlaube (no 40), 1886 (Volltext [Wikisource]), p. 724
- Deublers Briefe an Ernst Haeckel. In: Ernst Haeckel. Ausgewählte Briefwechsel. Historisch-kritische Ausgabe. Korrespondenz zu Weltanschauung, Kunst und Literatur, Band 21: Österreich und Schweiz. Dezember 1870 – August 1894. Hrsg. u. bearb. von Jörn Bohr unter Mitarbeit von Daniela Prutscher, Franz Steiner Verlag, Stuttgart 2025, ISBN 9783515138840.
- Joachim Kahl: Der Kreis um Konrad Deubler (Vortrag) beim ersten Konrad-Deubler-Symposium 1997 in Bad Goisern.
