= Kain (given name) =

Kain is a masculine given name. Notable people with the name include:

- Kain Adom (born 2007), English footballer
- Kain Colter (born 1990), American football player
- Kain Kong, American bass player from The Lookouts
- Kain Massin, Australian writer
- Kain Medrano (born 2001), American football player
- Kain O'Keeffe (born 1987), Australian actor
- Kain Tapper (1930–2004), Finnish sculptor
- Kain Taylor (born 1967), Australian footballer

Fictional characters:

- Kain (Legacy of Kain) from the Legacy of Kain video game series
- Kain Highwind in the Square Co., Ltd. game Final Fantasy IV
- Kain Phalanx from Shadow Skill
- Kain Pathos Crow, a dog-headed biochemist featured in several articles and stories produced for the SCP Foundation. Created by a retired administrator for the SCP Foundation website of the same username.

== See also ==
- Kain (surname)
- Kain (disambiguation)
