= Advocate =

Profession in the field of law

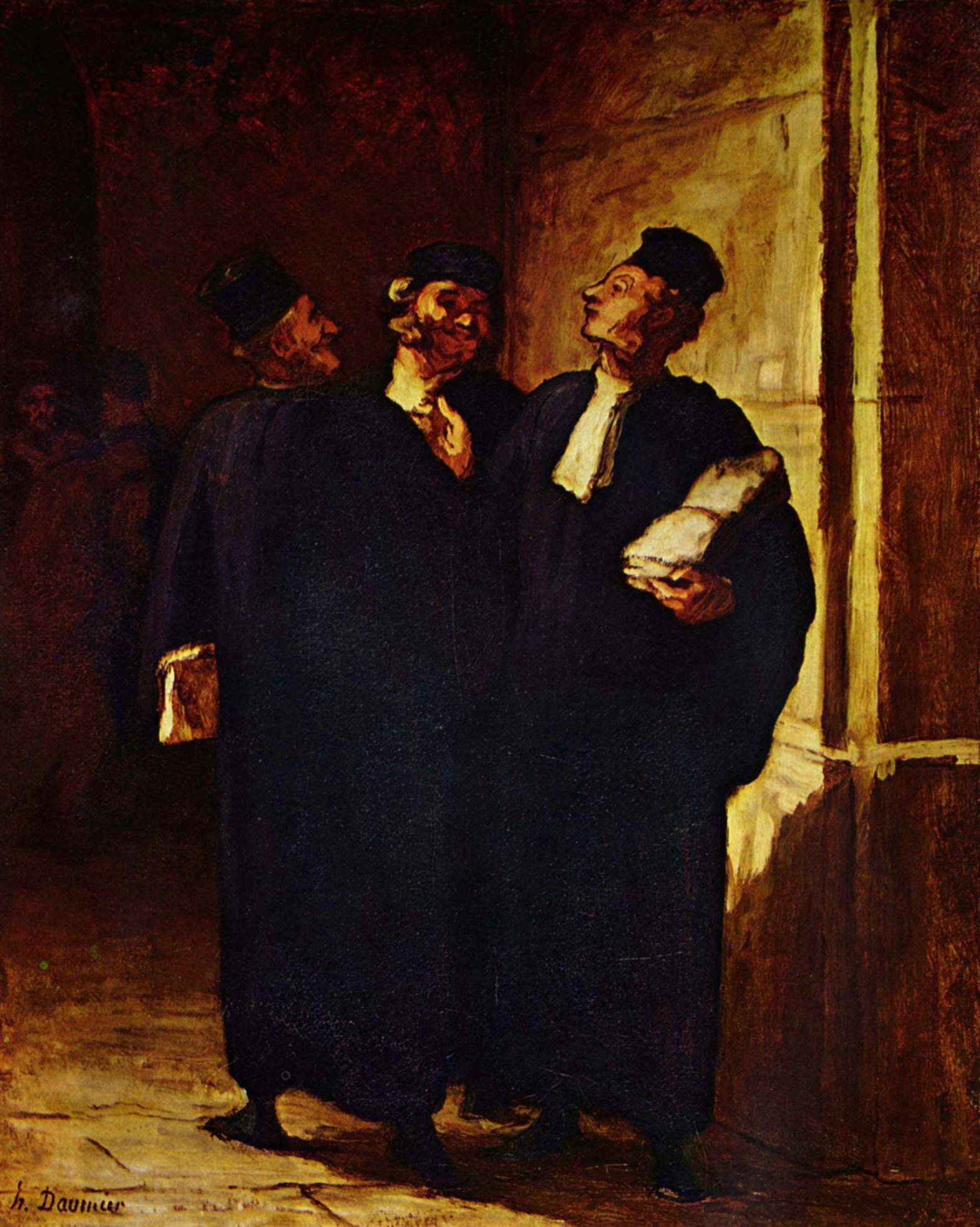
- 19th-century painting of Advocates, by French artist Honoré Daumier

Occupation
- Names: Barrister; Magistrate
- Activity sectors: Law

Description
- Competencies: Good memory, advocacy and interpersonal skills, analytical mind, critical thinking, commercial sense
- Fields of employment: Court, Tribunal
- Related jobs: Barrister, judge, jurist

An advocate is a professional in the field of law. Different countries and legal systems use the term with somewhat differing meanings. The broad equivalent in many English law–based jurisdictions could be a barrister or a solicitor. However, in Indo-Pak, other European and South American jurisdictions, "advocate" refers to a lawyer or magistrate representing in courts.

"Advocate" is in some languages an honorific for lawyers, such as "Adv. Sir Alberico Gentili". "Advocate" also has the everyday meaning of speaking out to help someone else, such as community or patient advocacy, or the support expected from an elected politician or complaints handler; this article does not cover those senses.

== Europe ==
=== England and Wales ===
In England and Wales, advocates and proctors practiced civil law in the Admiralty Courts and also, but in England only, in the ecclesiastical courts of the Church of England, in a similar way to barristers, attorneys and solicitors in the common law and equity courts.

Advocates, who formed the senior branch of the legal profession in their field, were Doctors of Law of the University of Oxford, Cambridge, or Dublin and Fellows of the Society of Doctors' Commons.

Advocates lost their exclusive rights of audience in probate and divorce cases when the Crown took these matters over from the church in 1857, and in Admiralty cases in 1859. The Society of Advocates was never formally wound up, but its building was sold off in 1865 and the last advocate died in 1912.

Barristers were admitted to the Court of Arches of the Church of England in 1867. More recently, Solicitor Advocates have also been allowed to play this role.

=== Scotland ===
==== Faculty of Advocates ====
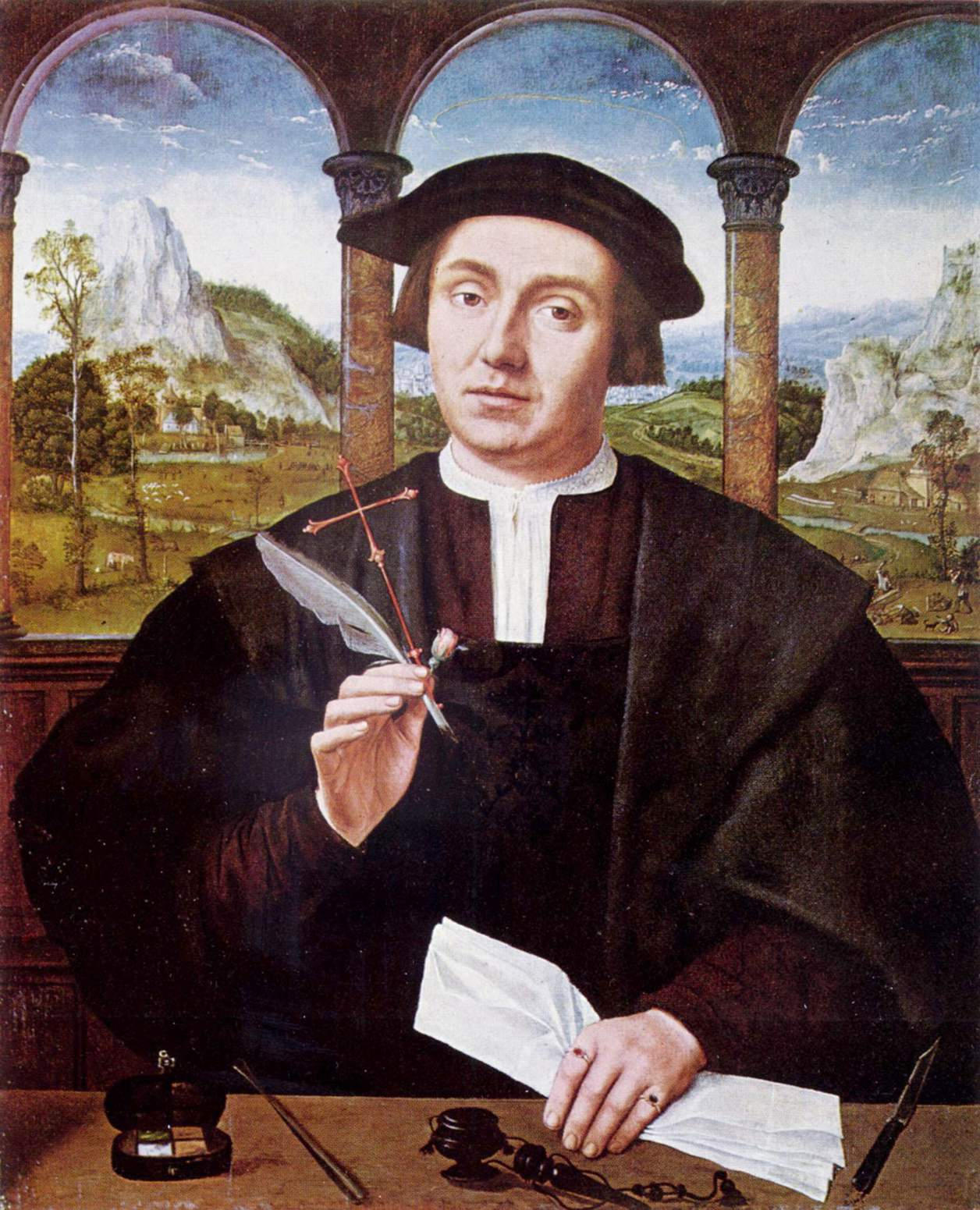
A 16th-century advocate

Advocates are regulated by the Faculty of Advocates in Edinburgh. The Faculty of Advocates has about 750 members, of whom about 460 are in private practice. About 75 are King's Counsel. The Faculty is headed by the Dean of the Faculty who, along with the Vice-Dean, Treasurer, and Clerk are elected annually by secret ballot.

The Faculty has a service company, Faculty Services Ltd, to which almost all Advocates belong, which organized the stables (sets of Advocates or barristers' chambers) and fee collection. This gives a guarantee to all newly called Advocates of a place. Until the end of 2007, there was an agreement with the Law Society of Scotland, which is the professional body for Scottish solicitors, as to the payment of fees, but this has now been replaced by the Law Society. It remains the case that Advocates are not permitted to sue for their fees, as they have no contractual relationship with their instructing solicitor or with the client. Their fees are honoraria.

Advocates wear wigs, white bow-ties (or falls in the case of senior counsel), straps and gowns as a dress in court.

==== Becoming an advocate ====
The process of becoming an advocate is referred to as devilling. All intrants will be Scottish solicitors, i.e. hold a Bachelor of Laws degree and the Diploma in Legal Practice, and must have completed the traineeships of two years (which in some cases may be reduced to eighteen months) required to qualify as a solicitor; or else will be members of the bar in another common law jurisdiction.

===== Admission to the Faculty of Advocates =====
At the end of the devilling period, a devil's admission to the Faculty is dependent on certification by the principal devil master that the devil is a fit and proper person to be an advocate and that the devil has been involved in a wide range of work in the course of devilling. A devil's competence in a number of aspects of written and oral advocacy is assessed during devilling, and a devil will not be admitted to the Faculty if assessed as not competent. Further details of this process can be found in the assessment section.

===== Recent developments =====
In recent years, increasing numbers of Advocates have come to the Scottish Bar after some time as solicitors, but it is possible to qualify with a law degree, after twenty-one months traineeship in a solicitor's office and almost a year as a 'devil', or apprentice advocate. There are exceptions for lawyers who are qualified in other European jurisdictions, but all must take the training course as 'devils'.

Until 2007, a number of young European lawyers were given a placement with Advocates under the European Young Lawyers Scheme organized by the British Council. They are known as 'Eurodevils', in distinction to the Scottish 'devils'. This scheme was withdrawn by the British Council. In January 2009, a replacement scheme began.

Lawyers qualified in other European Union states (but not in England and Wales) may have limited rights of audience in the Scottish supreme courts if they appear with an advocate, and a few solicitors known as 'solicitor-Advocates' have rights of audience, but for practical purposes, Advocates have almost exclusive rights of audience in the supreme courts – the High Court of Justiciary (criminal), and the Court of Session (civil). Advocates share the right of audience with solicitors in the sheriff courts and justice of the peace courts.

It used to be the case that Advocates were completely immune from suit etc. while conducting court cases and pre-trial work, as they had to act 'fearlessly and independently'; the rehearing of actions was considered contrary to public interest; and Advocates are required to accept clients, they cannot pick and choose. However, the seven-judge English ruling of Arthur J.S. Hall & Co. (a firm) v. Simons 2000 (House of Lords) declared that none of these reasons justified the immunity strongly enough to sustain it. This has been followed in Scotland in Wright v Paton Farrell (2006) obiter insofar as civil cases are concerned.

=== British Crown Dependencies ===
==== Isle of Man ====
Advocates are the only lawyers with rights of audience in the courts of the Isle of Man. An advocate's role is to advise on all matters of law: it may involve representing a client in the civil and criminal courts or advising a client on matters such as matrimonial and family law, trusts and estates, regulatory matters, property transactions, and commercial and business law. In court, Advocates wear a horsehair wig, stiff collar, bands, and a gown in the same way as barristers do elsewhere.

To become an advocate, it is normally necessary to hold either a qualifying law degree with no less than lower second class (2:2) honors, or else a degree in another subject with no less than lower second class (2:2) honors complemented by the Common Professional Examination. It is then necessary to obtain a legal professional qualification such as the Bar Professional Training Course or the Legal Practice Course. It is not, however, necessary actually to be admitted as an English barrister or solicitor to train as an advocate.

Trainee Advocates (as articled clerks are now more usually known) normally undertake a period of two years' training articled to a senior advocate; in the case of English barristers or solicitors who have been practicing or admitted for three years this training, the period is reduced to one year. Foreign lawyers who have been registered as legal practitioners in the Isle of Man for a certain time may also undertake a shorter period of training and supervision. During their training, all trainee Advocates are required to pass the Isle of Man bar examinations, which include papers on civil and criminal practice, constitutional and land law, and company law and taxation, as well as accounts. The examinations are rigorous and candidates are limited to three attempts to pass each paper.

Senior English barristers are occasionally licensed to appear as Advocates in cases expected to be unusually long or complex, without having to pass the bar examination or undertake further training: they are permitted only to act in relation to the matter for which they have been licensed. Similarly, barristers and solicitors employed as public prosecutors may be licensed to appear as Advocates without having to pass the bar examination or undertake further training: they are permitted only to act as such only for the duration of that employment.

The professional conduct of Advocates is regulated by the Isle of Man Law Society, which also maintains a library for its members in Douglas. While Advocates in the Isle of Man have not traditionally prefixed their names with 'Advocate' in the Channel Islands manner, some Advocates have now started to adopt this practice.

==== Jersey and the Bailiwick of Guernsey ====
Jersey and the Bailiwick of Guernsey are two separate legal jurisdictions, have largely two different sets of laws and have two separate, but similar, legal professions. In both jurisdictions, Advocates—properly called Advocates of the Royal Court—are the only lawyers with general rights of audience in their courts.

To be eligible to practice as an advocate in Jersey, it is necessary first to have a law degree from a British university or a Graduate Diploma in Law and to have qualified as a recognized legal professional in England and Wales, Scotland or Northern Ireland. Thereafter, a candidate must undertake two years of practical experience in a law office dealing with Jersey law, enrol on the Jersey Law Course provided by the Institute of Law, Jersey and pass examinations in six subjects. Alternatively, a person may apply to become a Jersey advocate two years after qualifying as a Jersey solicitor.

To become an advocate in Guernsey, one has to possess a valid law degree or diploma, plus a qualification as an English barrister or solicitor, or a French avocat. They must then study for the Guernsey Bar. Three months of study of Norman law at the Université de Caen (University of Caen) is required; this is no longer required for entry into the legal profession in Jersey.

Guernsey Advocates dress in the same way as barristers, but substitute a black biretta-like toque for a wig, while those in Jersey go bare-headed. Advocates are entitled to prefix their names with 'Advocate'; e.g. Mr. Tostevin is called to the Guernsey Bar and is henceforth known as Advocate Tostevin.

The head of the profession of advocate in each bailiwick is called the Bâtonnier.

=== Netherlands ===
In the Netherlands, the professional conduct and the professional education of the advocates is regulated by the Dutch bar association (Nederlandse orde van advocaten) pursuant to the Advocates Act (Advocatenwet).

Dutch advocates are admitted to the bar conditionally, and have full rights of audience with the district courts and court of appeal. In order to obtain unconditional qualification, the advocate has to complete the Dutch bar education (Beroepsopleiding Advocaten) and fulfil certain requirements (which may vary among the various judicial regions within the Netherlands) under the supervision of a senior advocate (the patroon) for a period of at least three years, called the stage. During this time, the advocate is referred to as an advocaat-stagiair(e).

In court, advocates must wear a long black robe (a toga) and a white pleated band (a bef).

=== Nordic countries ===
The Nordic countries have a united legal profession, which means that they do not draw a distinction between lawyers who plead in court and those who do not. To get an official recognition with an Advocates title, the candidate must have a legal degree, that is, completed ca. 5–6 years of legal studies from an accredited university in his or own country, and in addition have worked for some time (around 2 – 5 years) under the auspices of a qualified advocate and have some experience from court. When qualified, the candidate may obtain a license as an advocate, the equivalent of being called to the bar. In all the Scandinavian languages the title is advokat; in Finland advokat is the Swedish title for such a qualified lawyer, with the equivalent title in Finnish being asianajaja.

However, one does not necessarily have to be an advocate to represent a party in the Nordic countries legally. In Norway, a person with an appropriate law degree, for example, can practice law as a registered legal advisor (rettshjelper) instead, which gives many of the same rights as an advocate's title. Both in Sweden and Norway any adult, in theory, can represent a party in court without any prior approval, training, license or advocate title. In practice it's unusual, and in Norway, it's subject to the approval of the court, which is unlikely to give it except in very simple cases.

In English, the Scandinavian title of advokat is interchangeably also translated as barrister, lawyer or attorney-at-law.

=== Russia ===
In Russia, anyone with a legal education (lawyer) can practice law, but only a member of the Advokatura (Адвокатура) may practice before a criminal court (other person can be a defence counsel in criminal proceeding along with a member of Advokatura but not in lieu him) and Constitutional Court (leaving aside persons having academic degree of candidate or doctor in juridical sciences who also can represent parties in constitutional proceeding). Specialist degree in law is the most commonly awarded academic degree in Russian jurisprudence but after Russia's accession to the Bologna process only bachelor of laws and master of laws academic degrees are available in Russian institutions of higher education. An "advocate" is a lawyer who has demonstrated qualification and belongs to an organizational structure of Advocates specified by law, known as being "called to the bar" in Commonwealth countries.

An examination is administered by the qualifications commission of regional advocate's chamber for admission to its Advokatura. To sit for the exam, one must have a higher legal education and also two years of experience in legal work after graduation or a training program in a law firm after graduation. The exam is both written and oral, but the main test is oral. The written exam takes place in the form of computer testing and includes issues of the professional conduct of advocate and advocate's professional responsibility. After successfully passing of the written exam the candidates are allowed to take the oral exam. As part of the oral exam, the candidate must demonstrate his knowledge in various bodies of law and solve some mimic a real-life legal tasks. The candidate who does not pass the qualification exam can try to pass it again after 1 year only. The qualifications commission is composed of seven Advocates, two judges, two representatives of the regional legislature, and two representatives of the Ministry of Justice.

After successful passing the qualification exam a candidate should take the oath of advocate. From the moment of taking the oath, he becomes an advocate and a member of the advocate's chamber of the relevant federal subject of Russia. Advocate's chamber sends relevant information to the territorial subdivision of the Ministry of Justice of the Russian Federation, which includes the new advocate in the register of Advocates of the relevant federal subject of Russia and issues to him an advocate's certificate, which is the only official document confirming the status of an advocate, on the basis of this information. The status of an advocate is granted for an indefinite period and is not limited by any age. There is only 1 advocate's chamber in each federal subject of Russia. Each advocate can be the member of only 1 advocate's chamber and can be listed in the register of Advocates of the relevant federal subject of Russia only. In case of relocation to another region, the advocate ceases to be a member of the advocate's chamber and should be excluded from register of Advocates at the old place of residence (advocate's certificate should be returned to the subdivision of the Ministry of Justice of the Russian Federation, which issued it), and after that he becomes a member of the advocate's chamber and is included in the register of Advocates at the new place of residence (where he receive new advocate's certificate) without any exams. Each advocate can carry out his professional activity throughout Russia, regardless of membership in particular regional advocate's chamber and regardless of particular regional register where he is listed in. Advocates carry out their professional activity individually (advocate's cabinet) or as the member of advocate's juridical person (collegium of Advocates, advocate's bureau). Advocate can open own cabinet after at least 3 years legal practice in collegium or bureau. An advocate, who has opened own cabinet, can not be the member of any advocate's juridical person, and an advocate, who is the member of one advocate's juridical person, can not be the member of any other advocate's juridical person. Advocate is obliged to report to advocate's chamber any changes in his membership in a collegium or a bureau and, equally, opening and closing a cabinet.

An advocate can not be an individual entrepreneur, government official, municipal official, notary, judge, elected official. An advocate can not work under an employment (labour) contract, with the exception of scientific and teaching activities. An advocate may combine his status with the status of a patent attorney, a trustee in bankruptcy. An advocate may be a shareholder/owner of business juridical persons and a member of voluntary associations and political parties. Russian advocate may have a status of advocate (attorney, barrister, solicitor) in foreign jurisdiction, subject to above conditions.

Russian law provides for voluntary and involuntary suspension of advocate's status. Voluntary suspension for a term of 1 to 10 years occurs when an Advocate files relevant application to the advocate's chamber. Involuntary suspension is applicable in cases of serious illness, election to an elected position in federal, regional or local authorities, military conscription, declaration of absence made by the court decision. An Advocate can not carry out advocate's activity during suspension, otherwise he may be deprived of the right to be an Advocate. After the end of the suspension, advocate's status should be resumed without any additional conditions. Also Russian law provides for voluntary and involuntary termination of advocate's status. Voluntary termination of the status occurs when an Advocate files relevant application to the advocate's chamber. Involuntary termination of the status is applicable in cases of death, declaration of no having legal capacity or having limited legal capacity made by the court decision, conviction for intentional crime made by the court decision, violations of the federal law regulating advocate's activity or advocate's code of conduct found by advocate's chamber. The latter two cases incur lifetime prohibition on being an Advocate. In other cases, ex-Advocate can go back to being an Advocate on general grounds through a passing the qualification exam, on condition that the reasons for termination of advocate's status have ceased to exist.

Advocate's chambers are professional associations of Advocates, which are based on mandatory membership of Advocates. All regional advocate's chambers are mandatory members of Federal Chamber of Advocates of Russian Federation (Russian: Федеральная палата адвокатов Российской Федерации), which is professional association at the federal level.

As of 2018, there were 49,4 Advocates per 100,000 people in Russia.

In Russia, foreign Advocates can advise on the legislation of their countries; they should register in the special register maintained by the Ministry of Justice of the Russian Federation to obtain the right to carry out this activity. Foreign advocate can in addition become Russian advocate. There are two possible paths for that. The first possibility is to become Russian advocate on the same basis as Russian citizens (i.e. through higher legal education in one of Russian universities, two years of experience in legal work in Russia after graduation or a training program in Russian law firm after graduation, successful passing the qualification exam). Since Russia's WTO Accession the second possibility is available: foreign advocate can just pass special qualification exam to become Russian advocate.

== Asia ==
=== Bangladesh ===
In Bangladesh, after passing the Higher Secondary School Certificate, one can apply for admission for studying law in Universities. There are several public and private universities which provide Bachelor of Laws and Master of Laws degree in Bangladesh. Generally, the LL.B. course is equivalent to a four-year bachelor's degree. Graduate lawyers have to seat for and pass the Bar Council Exam to become Advocates.

==== Advocate of Supreme Court ====
By passing the Bangladesh Bar Council Exam, Advocates are eligible to practice in the Supreme Court of Bangladesh and other courts. A license is obtained after successful completion of two years practice in the lower courts by applicant, which is reviewed by a body of the relevant provincial Bar Council. Most applications after successful completion of the requirement, are accepted.

=== India ===
In India, the law relating to the Advocates is the Advocates Act, 1961 introduced and thought up by Ashoke Kumar Sen, the then law minister of India, which is a law passed by the Parliament and is administered and enforced by the Bar Council of India. Under the Act, the Bar Council of India is the supreme regulatory body to regulate the legal profession in India and also to ensure the compliance of the laws and maintenance of professional standards by the legal profession in the country.

Each State has a Bar Council of its own whose function is to enroll the Advocates willing to practice predominantly within the territorial confines of that State and to perform the functions of the Bar Council of India within the territory assigned to them. Therefore, each law degree holder must be enrolled with a (single) State Bar Council to practice in India. However, enrollment with any State Bar Council does not restrict the Advocate from appearing before any court in India, even though it is beyond the territorial jurisdiction of the State Bar Council which he is enrolled in.

The advantage of having the State Bar Councils is that the workload of the Bar Council of India can be divided into these various State Bar Councils and also that matters can be dealt with locally and in an expedited manner. However, for all practical and legal purposes, the Bar Council of India retains with it, the final power to take decisions in any and all matters related to the legal profession on the whole or with respect to any Advocate individually, as so provided under the Advocates Act, 1961.

The process of being entitled to practice in India is twofold. First, the applicant must be a holder of a law degree from a recognised institution in India (or from one of the four recognised Universities in the United Kingdom) and second, must pass the enrollment qualifications of the Bar Council of the state where he/she seeks to be enrolled. For this purpose, the Bar Council of India has an internal Committee whose function is to supervise and examine the various institutions conferring law degrees and to grant recognition to these institutions once they meet the required standards. In this manner, the Bar Council of India also ensures the standard of education required for practicing in India is met with. As regards the qualification for enrollment with the State Bar Council, while the actual formalities may vary from one State to another, yet predominately they ensure that the application has not been a bankrupt /criminal and is generally fit to practice before courts of India.

Enrollment with a Bar Council also means that the law degree holder is recognised as an Advocate and is required to maintain a standard of conduct and professional demeanor at all times, both on and off the profession. The Bar Council of India also prescribes "Rules of Conduct" to be observed by the Advocates in the courts, while interacting with clients and even otherwise.

All Advocates in India are at the same level and are recognised as such. Any distinction, if any, is made only on the basis of seniority, which implies the length of practice at the Bar. As a recognition of law practice and specialisation in an area of law, there is a concept of conferral of Senior Advocate status. An Advocate may be recognised by the Judges of the High Court (in case of an Advocate practicing before that High Court) or by the Supreme Court (in case of the Advocate practicing before the Supreme Court). While the conferral of Senior Advocate status not only implies distinction and fame of the Advocate, it also requires the Senior Advocate to follow higher standards of conduct and some distinct rules. Also, a Senior Advocate is not allowed to interact directly with the clients. He can only take briefs from other Advocates and argue on the basis of the details given by them. From the year 2010 onward a mandatory rule is made for lawyers passing out from the year 2009–10 to sit for an evaluation test named AIBE (All India Bar Exam) for one to qualify as an advocate and practice in the courts. However, to practice law before the Supreme Court of India, Advocates must first appear for and qualify in the Supreme Court Advocate on Record Examination conducted by the Supreme Court.

Further, under the Constitutional structure, there is a provision for the elevation of Advocates as judges of High Courts and Supreme Court. The only requirement is the Advocate must have ten years standing before the High Court(/s) or before the Supreme Court to be eligible for such. (Article 217 and 124 of the Constitution of India for High Courts and Supreme Court respectively)

=== Pakistan ===
There are four levels of Advocates exist in Pakistan, 1. Advocate 2. Advocate High Court 3. Advocate Supreme Court 4. Senior Advocate Supreme Court:

==== Advocate ====
The first level is that of an Advocate, who is eligible to practice in the district courts or lower courts in their respective province. An Advocate is considered an officer of the court. To become an Advocate, one can qualify by completing a five-year law degree (LL.B (Hons)), or by obtaining a foreign LL.B degree of a shorter duration, recognized by the relevant authorities. Additionally, they must complete six months of pupillage under a senior Advocate in their chambers. Afterward, they are required to pass a GAT test recognized by the Higher Education Commission of Pakistan (HEC) and the Pakistan Bar Council, achieving a minimum passing score of 50%. Subsequently, they must successfully clear the Bar admission test and undergo an examination conducted by the Bar Council of their respective province to determine their suitability for becoming an Advocate and confirm that they have no criminal convictions. Upon passing a multiple-choice question examination and an interview conducted by members of the provincial Bar Council, the Bar Council will issue them a license to practice before the Subordinate Courts up to the High Court.

==== Advocate High Court ====
After completing two years of practice as an Advocate, with a minimum of ten successfully litigated cases, the Advocate will be required to submit a list of these cases for examination by a committee appointed by the High Court. The committee, chaired by a High Court Judge, will review the cases and, if satisfied, grant their approval for the Advocate's elevation to practice as an Advocate of the High Court. Upon approval, the committee will send the recommendation directly to the Bar Council, and the Advocate will be issued a license to practice as an Advocate of the High Court. As an Advocate of the High Court, they will have the right to practice in any court throughout the country, except for the Supreme Court of Pakistan.

==== Advocate Supreme Court ====
Advocate Supreme Court is the third level. After successful completion of ten years of practice in the High Courts by the applicant, the panel of members of Pakistan Bar Council and one judge of the Supreme Court of Pakistan, review the application. (Before 1985 the requirement was successful completion of five years practice in the High Courts of Pakistan.) Over fifty per cent of applications are accepted, after successful completion of the requirement. An unsuccessful application in one year does not bar the candidate from re-applying in the next judicial year.

The highest level is the Senior Advocate Supreme Court. It is Pakistan's title equivalent to Queen's Counsel in the United Kingdom. After at least fifteen years of practice, by invitation or by an application to a panel of Supreme Court Judges headed by the Chief Justice of Pakistan, one can become Senior Advocate of Supreme Court of Pakistan. Very few applications are accepted and even fewer invitations are made. Attorneys General are usually invited by the Supreme Court on the appointment, to the office. So are some notable High Court judges who upon retirement choose to practice before the Supreme Court, where they are still eligible to do so.

=== Sri Lanka ===
In Sri Lanka (formally Ceylon) till 1973 Advocate was a practitioner in a court of law who is legally qualified to prosecute and defend actions in such court on the retainer of clients. Advocates had to pass the HSC exam and enter the Ceylon Law College and follow the Advocates course and sit for the relevant exams. Thereafter, they would have to practice under a senior advocate before being called to the bar for admission as an Advocate of the Supreme Court of Ceylon. Members of the English, Scottish and Irish Bars are permitted to be admitted to a Barrister without examination on payment of a fee. Ceylonese Advocates with three years standing were allowed to be called to the English Bar without examination on completing three terms. The Justice Law No. 44 of 1973 of the National State Assembly created a single group of practitioners known as Attorneys-at-law. The current equivalent to an advocate is a counsel who is a trial lawyer distinguished from an instructing attorney.

== Africa ==
=== South Africa ===
In South Africa, there are two main branches of legal practitioner: attorneys, who do legal work of all kinds, and Advocates, who are specialist litigators; see Attorneys in South Africa. In general, Advocates (also called 'counsel') are 'briefed' by attorneys when a specialist skill in court-based litigation, or in research into the law (an opinion) is required. Referral Advocates thus have no direct contact with clients and are said to be in a 'referral' profession. However, Advocates who have a Trust Account and hold a valid Fidelity Fund Certificate are authorized to take briefs directly from the public and attorneys respectively.

The key formal distinction, however, is the different rights with regard to the courts in which they may appear. Advocates have the right to appear in any court, while attorneys have the right to appear only in the lower courts. (And, under certain conditions, can acquire the right of appearance in the superior courts, by applying to the registrar of the provincial division of the relevant High Court.) A further distinction is that while attorneys practice in partnership, Advocates are individual practitioners and never form partnerships; practice in "Chambers" and / or "Groups" is standard.

The requirements to enter private practice as Advocates (Junior Counsel) are to hold the LL.B. degree, and to become a member of a Bar Association by undergoing a period of training (pupilage) for one year with a practicing Advocate, and to sit an admission examination. See Legal education in South Africa.

On the recommendation of the Bar Councils, an advocate "of proven experience and skill" with at least ten years experience, may be appointed by the President of South Africa as a Senior Counsel (SC; also referred to as a "silk"). Junior advocates are commonly rewarded with a traditional gift of a red brief bag by a Senior Counsel as recognition for excellence.

State Advocates act as a public prosecutor in High Court matters, typically in cases requiring preparation and research. They are appointed by the National Prosecuting Authority and are attached to the Office of the National Director of Public Prosecutions.

== America ==
=== Brazil ===
In Brazil, the bar examination occurs nationally in March, August, and December. These examinations are unified and organized by the Order of Attorneys of Brazil. After 5 years in law school, Brazilian law students are required to take the bar exam, which consists of 2 phases: the multiple choice test and written test, without any further requirements.

The Constitution of Brazil applies restrictions on professional practice of law in the fulfillment of the requirements, which may include in addition to graduation, formal submission of the applicant in the proficiency tests. The Order exam is tied to Law No. 8609 of 4/7/1994:

"Article 8: For registration as an attorney is needed: IV - "To pass the Examination of the Order;"

Within its powers expressly granted by the Constitution, the ordinary legislative demands that whoever wishes to pursue the legal profession possess the degree of Bachelor of Law and approval of Examination of Order, whose preparation and implementation is done by their own class. The Constitution itself provides for the restriction, and the Statute of Law requires the examination.

The bar exam in Brazil approves very few students and is considered a hard one. For instance, in February 2014, the Bar association made a release stating that only 19.64% of students had been approved in the last exam and were able to register as a lawyer.

== See also ==
- Advocate General
- Advocatus
- Barrister
- Judge Advocate General
- Jurist
- Lawspeaker
- Ombudsman
- Solicitor
- Solicitor-Advocate
