= Isle of Man Law Society =

The Isle of Man Law Society is the professional body in respect of the advocates' profession in the Isle of Man. The Society's role is to regulate and to provide a service for its members.

The Society is the longest-established professional body in the Isle of Man, formed by the Law Society Act 1859 passed by Tynwald while the island's capital was still at Castletown; Castle Rushen appears on the badge of the Society. Whilst it is widely thought that the Society was established to provide its members with access to a law library, which still exists at the Hall of the Society in Douglas and holds legal case histories and reference books. This is a misconception, the Law Library was in fact established in 1825 by a group of Advocates and the senior judiciary under the title the Isle of Man Law Library Society. Which was 25 years before the Society of Advocates was formed. The Library was housed in Castle Rushen until the Law Society moved it to Athol Street, Douglas. The Society of Advocates merged with the Law Library Library Society in 1850, which when incorporated in 1859 changed its name to the Isle of Man Law Society. The Society's role has developed and, as well as dealing with the legal profession's relationship with government and other bodies, the Society has disciplinary functions in respect of its members and has responsibilities concerning the provision of education and guidance to the membership as a whole.

The Society operates through an elected Council and various special purpose committees, all of whose members serve on a voluntary basis. One place on the Council is filled by a member nominated and elected by the associate membership of the Society, which nominee must be an associate member.

The Society holds an annual general meeting in January, at which elections to Council are held, and the Council and committees report to the membership at large.

The Society employs a professional chief executive officer and other staff to carry out the administrative role of the Society.

== Membership ==
The Society's membership is divided into four categories:

- ordinary members, who are qualified Isle of Man advocates
- associate members, who are lawyers qualified in other jurisdictions who are registered under the Legal Practitioners Registration Act 1986 and who have voluntarily applied to join the Society
- student members, who are trainee advocates currently serving the necessary training period articled to a qualified advocate
- honorary members: other persons who have been elected to membership under Part I of the Advocates Act 1995.

== Presidents ==
Each president of the Society usually serves two years with effect from the Society's annual general meeting in January, with two preceding years as vice president.

- 2001 – John L M Quinn
- 2003 – Andrew Juan Corlett (then managing director of Cains - not to be confused with Andrew Thomas Kaneen Corlett who is currently the First Deemster)
- 2005 - John Callin
- 2007 – Dr Sharon Roberts
- 2009 – Jonathan Wild
- 2011 – Jason Stanley
- 2013 – Kevin O'Riordan
- 2015 – Simon Cain
- 2017 – Jane Gray
- 2019 – Tim Swift
- 2020 - Kathryn Clough
- 2023 - Victoria Unsworth
- Present - Christopher Webb
