= Kane Ian =

Kane Ian is a disc jockey and Singapore-based musician, known for his Jackin House and Deep House works. Notable releases include Space Nutz (Dustpan Recordings, 2010) and Tales of The Night (Dustpan Recordings, 2011), and recently known also from house compilations "Amsterdam Dance Essentials 2015, Deep House".

He is primarily identified with the house music scene in Singapore, where he resides, but is active as a disc jockey around the world.

Influenced by the sounds of old school funk, soul and jazz and his brother's extensive music collection, Ian started making music at the age of 14 and started DJing in the year 1999. In the same year, he started school at Nanyang Polytechnic, Singapore where he furthered his passion for Computer Science and attained a Diploma in Engineering Informatics. Soon after, he went on to serve his 2 year mandatory National Service at the Singapore Armed Forces and later went on to further his musical education at SAE Institute, Singapore and graduated with a Bachelor of Arts (Honours) Degree in Recording Arts.

In 2007, Kane Ian founded Dustpan Recordings, an independent company based in Singapore which releases electronic music and dance music. Dustpan Recordings releases both artist albums and various compilations. Dustpan's current roster of artists includes Demarkus Lewis, William a.k.a. Mr Pirated, Uneaq, Dave Allison, Soydan, Ketel Juan, Dave Miller, CCO, Chemars, J Sweet, Funk Mediterraneo, Miguel Palhares, Mike Jules, High Maintenance, Juwan Rates, Cyril Yarisantos, Saint Laurent, J Caprice, Ed Nine, Mike Sample, Little Purple, Byron Foxx, TBF, Fergus, Jon Iler and Castlebed.

In 2011, Kane Ian was featured on the front cover of Juice Magazine, Singapore where he was voted “Best Electronic Dance Music Producer".

As a remixer, he has worked for a diverse range of artists including Inland Knights, Magik Johnson, The Quirk Burglars, L Boogie, Mr Clean, Gapswon, Diem, Sona and Belle Epoque. After a brief hiatus, he has recently returned to production, remixing artists like Spuma and Francesco Carrieri.

Kane Ian is sponsored by brands such as X-mini, Sony and Viscoustic.

He is currently a resident DJ at Tanjong Beach Club and W Hotel in Singapore where he performs regularly.

== Discography (selected releases) ==
- Cat Smiles
- Particular Style
- Dustpan 5 Years
- Best of Dustpan Volume 1
- Tales Of The Night
- Robot Dance EP
- The Daily EP
- The Ying & Yang EP
- Space Nutz
- The Skate Park Jam EP
