= Cane Creek =

Cane Creek may refer to:

- Cane Creek (Indiana), a stream in Indiana
- Cane Creek (Butler County, Missouri), a stream in southern Missouri
- Cane Creek (Byrd Creek), a stream in southeast Missouri
- Cane Creek (Haw River tributary, right bank), a stream in Alamance County, North Carolina
- Cane Creek (Haw River tributary, left bank), a stream in Alamance County, North Carolina
- Cane Creek (Hyco River tributary), a stream in Caswell and Person Counties, North Carolina
- Cane Creek Cycling Components, a manufacturer and designer of cycling components; see Dia-Compe
