= Cains Creek =

Stream in the US state of Missouri

Coordinates: 39°27′37″N 91°08′38″W

Cains Creek (also called Cain Creek) is a stream in Pike County in the U.S. state of Missouri. It is a tributary of Grassy Creek.

Cains Creek was named for the fact cane was an important cash crop in the area.

== See also ==
- List of rivers of Missouri
