= Kane =

Kane or KANE may refer to:

== Art, entertainment and media ==
=== Fictional entities ===
- Kane (comics), the main character of the eponymous comic book series by Paul Grist
- Kane (Command & Conquer), Tiberium universe character in the Command & Conquer video game series
- Kane (fantasy), fantasy character created by Karl Edward Wagner
- Kane, a character in the Doctor Who story, Dragonfire
- Adam "Kane" Marcus, one of the title characters in Kane & Lynch: Dead Men
- Kane, a character in the science fiction film Alien
- Kane, a character in the Outlanders science fiction novel series
- Kane family, a fictional family on the ABC daytime soap opera All My Children
- Kane family in The Kane Chronicles, book series by Rick Riordan
- Charles Foster Kane, lead character in the film Citizen Kane
- Daniel "Dan" Kane (Captain Terror), ally of Puck
- Garrison Kane, a Marvel Comics character
- Reverend Henry Kane, a fictional villain from the Poltergeist film series
- Lord Kane of Runefaust, from the video game Shining Force
- Killer Kane, a villain character in the Buck Rogers film series
- Marcus Kane, the vice chancellor on the TV series The 100
- Roland Kane, the main antagonist of the 2008 videogame Turok
- Will Kane, lead character in the film High Noon

=== Music ===
- Kane (instrument), Japanese bell
- Kane (American band), American Southern rock band
- Kane (Dutch band), Dutch rock band

=== Other uses in arts, entertainment and media ===
- KANE (AM), radio station licensed to New Iberia, Louisiana, United States
- Kane 103.7 FM, community radio station in Guildford, United Kingdom
- Kane (video game), 1986 home computer game published by Mastertronic
- Citizen Kane, a 1941 film directed by Orson Welles
- Kane & Abel (novel), a 1979 novel by Jeffrey Archer

== Gods ==
- Kāne, major Hawaiian god
- Kāne Milohai, minor Hawaiian god

== People ==
- Kane (given name), shared by several notable people
- Kane (surname), shared by several notable people
- Kane (wrestler) (born 1967), ring name of American professional wrestler and Knox County, Tennessee mayor Glenn Jacobs
- Stevie Ray, American professional wrestler Lash Huffman (born 1958), who has used the ring name Kane
- The Undertaker, American professional wrestler Mark Calaway (born 1965), who briefly used the ring name Kane
- Big Daddy Kane (born 1968), rapper
- Daniel "Kane" Garcia, of the American hip hop duo Kane & Abel

== Places ==
- Kane (ancient city), Turkey

=== America ===
==== Illinois ====
- Kane, Illinois, US
- Kane County, Illinois, US

==== Elsewhere ====
- Kane Township, Benton County, Iowa
- Kane, Pennsylvania, US, founded by American Civil War general Thomas L. Kane
- Kane County, Utah, US
- Kane Mountain, mountain in Fulton County, New York
- Anoka County–Blaine Airport, Minnesota, US (ICAO airport code: KANE)
- Cape Kane, Greenland

== See also ==
- Cain (disambiguation)
- Cane (disambiguation)
- Kain (disambiguation)
- Kaine (disambiguation)
