= Caner =

Caner is a Turkish masculine given name and a surname. Notable people with the name include:

== Given name ==
- Caner Ağca (born 1984), Turkish football player
- Caner Cavlan (born 1992), Dutch football player
- Caner Celep (born 1984), Turkish football player
- Caner Cindoruk (born 1980), Turkish actor
- Caner Çolak (born 1991), Turkish football player
- Caner Dagli, American Islamic scholar
- Caner Erdeniz (born 1987), Turkish basketball player
- Caner Erkin (born 1988), Turkish football player
- Caner Koca (born 1996), Turkish football player
- Caner Osman (born 1991), Turkish-Macedonian basketball player
- Caner Osmanpaşa (born 1988), Turkish football player
- Caner Taslaman (born 1968), Turkish academic
- Caner Topaloğlu (born 1985), Turkish basketball player
- Caner Topçu (born 1997), Turkish actor
- Caner Toptaş (born 2001), Turkish weightlifter

== Middle name ==
- Yiğit Caner Aydın (born 1992), Turkish para archer

== Surname ==
- Cevdet Caner (born 1973), Austrian entrepreneur
- Emir Caner (born 1970), Swedish-American academic
- Ergun Caner (born 1966), Swedish-American academic, author, and Baptist minister
- Federico Caner (born 1973), Italian politician
- George Caner (1894–1984), American tennis player
- Nik Caner-Medley (born 1983), Azerbaijani-American basketball player
