= Hilary Cane =

Space physicist

Hilary Vivien Cane
- Born: 1949 (age 76–77)
- Education: University of Tasmania
- Spouse: William C. Erickson
- Scientific career
- Thesis: Non-thermal galactic background radiation (1977)

Hilary Cane is planetary scientist known for her research on solar energetic particles.

== Education and career ==
Cane earned her Ph.D. in radio astronomy from the University of Tasmania in 1978. In 1979, following her Ph.D., she joined the National Aeronautics and Space Agency's Goddard Space Flight center to work on the International Cometary Explorer. The data from her work provided evidence for a new class of radio bursts called SA events, which defined the characteristics of radio emission from interplanetary shocks. Following this, in 1984, Dr. Cane continued to work with solar and galactic particle observations from Interplanetary Monitoring Platform-8 (IMP 8). In the years following, Cane and her husband William Erickson split their time between Maryland and Bruny Island, Tasmania, where Cane continued to work at the Goddard Space Flight Center.

In 2014, Cane was elected a fellow of the American Geophysical Union "for elucidating the relative roles of flares and coronal mass ejections as sources of energetic particles from the Sun."

Since 2003, Cane has been a member of the International Astronomical Union.

== Research ==
Cane's research investigated the abundance of solar energetic particles and the magnetic field of the sun and coronal mass ejections, particles released from the sun that interfere with power grids.

=== Selected publications ===
- Richardson, I. G.; Cane, H. V. (June 2010). "Near-Earth Interplanetary Coronal Mass Ejections During Solar Cycle 23 (1996 – 2009): Catalog and Summary of Properties". Solar Physics. 264 (1): 189–237. Bibcode:2010SoPh..264..189R. doi:10.1007/s11207-010-9568-6. ISSN 0038-0938. S2CID 121847196.
- Cane, Hilary V. (2000). "Coronal Mass Ejections and Forbush Decreases". Cosmic Rays and Earth. Space Sciences Series of ISSI. Vol. 10. pp. 55–77. doi:10.1007/978-94-017-1187-6_4. ISBN 978-90-481-5615-3. S2CID 116887014.
- Cane, H. V.; Erickson, W. C.; Prestage, N. P. (2002). "Solar flares, type III radio bursts, coronal mass ejections, and energetic particles". Journal of Geophysical Research: Space Physics. 107 (A10): SSH 14–1–SSH 14–19. Bibcode:2002JGRA..107.1315C. doi:10.1029/2001JA000320. hdl:2060/20020080879. ISSN 2156-2202.
- Rosenvinge, Tycho Von; Cane, Hilary V. (2006), "Solar Energetic Particles: An Overview", Solar Eruptions and Energetic Particles, American Geophysical Union (AGU), pp. 103–114, doi:10.1029/165gm11, ISBN 978-1-118-66620-3
- "Hilary V. Cane." NASA.gov, NASA, science.gsfc.nasa.gov/670/seminar/previous_lep/fall2000/

== Awards and honors ==
- Fellow, American Geophysical Union (2014)

== Personal life ==
Cane started orienteering in the mid-1970s and has published a walker's guide to Bruny Island. Cane was married to the astronomer William C. Erickson who established the Bruny Island Radio Spectrometer before he died in 2015.
