= Kaine =

Kaine may refer to:

- Kaine (surname), including a list of people with the name
- Kaine (city), ancient name for Qena, a city in Upper Egypt
- Kaine (Laconia), an ancient town in Laconia, Greece
- Kaine (manga), a manga by Kaori Yuki

== Persons with the given name ==
- Kaine Bennett Charleston (born 1983), Australian film producer and actor
- Kaine Harling (born 1977), Australian film producer and cameraman
- Kaine Manihera (born 1986), New Zealand rugby player
- Kaine Parker, fictional character in comic books that is a clone of Spider-Man
- Kainé, fictional character in the 2010 video game Nier (video game)
- Kaine Robertson (born 1980), New Zealand rugby player

== See also ==
- Caine (disambiguation)
- Kane (disambiguation)
