= Bairn =

Term for a child

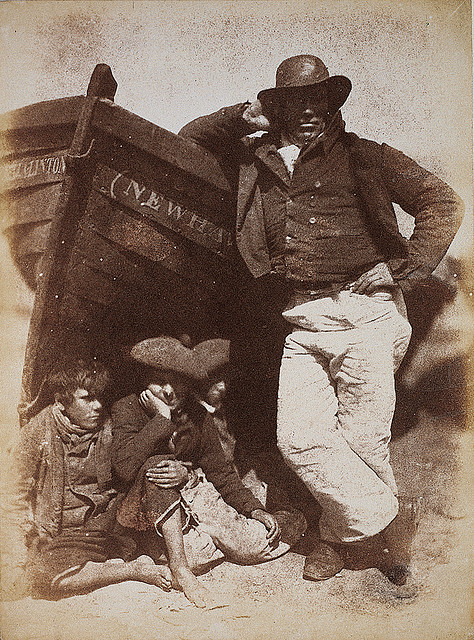
A man with "his boat and bairns" in a calotype print from the 1840s, now in the National Galleries of Scotland

Bairn is a Northern English, Scottish English and Scots term for a child. It originated in Old English as bearn, becoming restricted to Scotland and the North of England, c. 1700. In Hull, the r is dropped and the word bain is used.

The word was included in The English Dialect Dictionary with variant spellings barn, bayn, and bayne, that reflect varying pronunciations.

Compare with the Swedish, Norwegian, Icelandic, Faroese and Danish word for child barn, the West Frisian bern, and the Latvian bērns.

Cain bairns are children seized by witches and warlocks as tribute for the devil.

== Examples of use ==
Examples of the term's use include the phrase "Jock Tamson's bairns" as an idiomatic expression of egalitarian sentiment and the title of the 19th century Geordie folk song "Come Geordie ha'd the bairn". "Baloo Baleerie", a traditional Scottish lullaby, incorporates the term repeatedly, as does "The Great Silkie of Sule Skerry", a traditional folk song from Orkney.
