= Cain (given name) =

Cain is a masculine given name. It is borne by:

- Cain, the son of Adam and Eve in the Bible
- Cain Ackland (born 1982), former Australian rules footballer
- Cain Attard (born 1994), Maltese footballer
- Cain Cressall, Australian singer and vocal coach
- Cain Culto, American singer and violinist
- Cain Dotson (born 1971), Swedish former footballer
- Cain Fara (born 1994), Argentine footballer
- Cain Hope Felder (1943–2019), American biblical scholar and professor
- Cain Liddle (born 1975), former Australian rules footballer
- Cain Madden (born 1996), American football player
- Cain Mathema (born 1947), Zimbabwean politician and writer
- Cain Robb (born 2003), English rugby league footballer
- Cain Sandoval (born 2002), American boxer
- Cain Sartain (1843–1902), American planter, justice of the peace, sheriff, and state legislator
- Cain Seedorf (born 2000), Dutch footballer
- Cain Velasquez (born 1982), Mexican-American mixed martial arts fighter and 2010 UFC heavyweight champion
