= Dustpan Recordings =

Singapore based record label

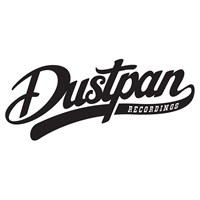
- Type: Independent Company
- Industry: Music
- Founded: Singapore (2007)
- Headquarters: Singapore, Singapore
- Key people: Kane Ian
- Products: Electronic dance music
- Revenue: profit
- Website: www.dustpanrecordings.com

Dustpan Recordings is a Singapore based record label, established in 2007, which releases electronic music and dance music. The label was founded in Singapore in 2007 by Kane Ian. Dustpan Recordings releases both artist albums and various compilations. Dustpan's current roster of artists includes Demarkus Lewis, William a.k.a. Mr Pirated, Uneaq, Dave Allison, Soydan, Ketel Juan, Dave Miller, CCO, Chemars, Diem, Spuma, J Sweet, Funk Mediterraneo, Mr Clean, Miguel Palhares, L Boogie, Mike Jules, High Maintenance, Juwan Rates, Cyril Yarisantos, Saint Laurent, J Caprice, Ed Nine, Mike Sample, Little Purple, Byron Foxx, TBF, Fergus, Jon Iler, Castlebed and Sona.

Dustpan Recordings hosts various music events, and is a frequent resident company at Tanjong Beach Club, Loof, Mimolette, Blujaz and W Hotel in Singapore.

In 2008, Dustpan Recordings organized its first label showcase at the Winter Music Conference in Miami, Florida with label artists Mr Pirated and Mr Clean.

== Artist recordings ==
=== Albums ===
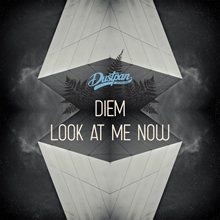
Label artwork of the 60th EP Released 2014

- Kane Ian - Space Nutz (2011)
- Various Artists - Best of Dustpan Volume 1 (2012)
- Kane Ian - Dustpan 5 Years (2012)
- Spuma - Dreamin (2014)
- Sugarcane Family - Socialite (2014)

=== Singles and EPs ===
- Kane Ian - The Skate Park Jam (2007)
- Saint Laurent - Inspirations (2007)
- TBF - Hard Times EP (2007)
- William - The Rooftop EP (2007)
- Dave Miller - Come Get Some EP (2007)
- TBF - The Disco Way (2007)
- Diem - Drifter EP (2008)
- J. Caprice - Texas Tea EP (2008)
- Uneaq - This Is Jazz (2008)
- Kane Ian & William - The Ying Yang EP (2008)
- Dave Allison - Quarter Past Twelve (2008)
- William - The Jazzarama EP (2008)
- Sona - The Genre Busta EP (2008)
- Castlebed - Get Up On It (2008)
- Diem - Do It All Night (2008)
- Sona - The Hey Run EP (2008)
- Mr Pirated - Turk's Delight (2008)
- TBF - All That House (2008)
- Byron Foxx - Synth City EP (2008)
- Soydan - Ceviz EP (2008)
- Chemars - Less Conversation EP (2009)
- Various Artists - Slim Pickings EP (2009)
- Brandon Black - Redemption EP (2009)
- High Maintenance - Slide Your Jib EP (2009)
- Chemars - Get The Funk EP (2009)
- L.Boogie - Boogie Monster (2009)
- Hokus - Sunny Night EP (2009)
- Mikkaël Feat. Bonnie Wrongford - Entertaining Pablo (2009)
- Various Artist - Treat Beats EP (2009)
- Sleepless DJs - No More Sleep EP (2010)
- Mr. Clean - King Of The Sound EP (2010)
- Mr. Clean - I'm Sneaky Remixes (2010)
- Mr Pirated - Diggin Do EP (2010)
- Ketel Juan - Baked Fresh EP (2011)
- Little Purple - Discolicious (2011)
- Kane Ian - Robot Dance EP (2011)
- Diem - Make Ya Wanna (2011)
- Juwan Rates & Brandon Thompson - Drunken Master EP (2011)
- Kane Ian - The Daily EP (2011)
- Ketel Juan - Subliminal Funks EP (2011)
- Kane Ian - Tales of The Night (2011)
- Little Purple - First Love (2011)
- Fergus - Time To Regroovinate EP (2011)
- CCO - Old Buddy Bolden (2012)
- Mike Sample - You Don't Give EP (2012)
- Demarkus Lewis - Return of The Leg Warmers EP (2012)
- Ed Nine - Can't Deny This (2012)
- Ryan Truman - Enjoy Yourself EP (2013)
- Funk Mediterraneo - Velvet Hands (2013)
- J Sweet - The Youngster EP (2013)
- Jon Iler - Snax Trax EP (2013)
- Cyril Yarisantos - Reprise EP (2013)
- Juwan Rates - Grooves At Midnight (2013)
- Mike Jules - Denim Hi-Tops EP (2013)
- Miguel Palhares - Be There EP (2013)
- Funk Mediterraneo - A World of Superheroes ( 2013)

== See also ==
- List of record labels
