= Kain =

Kain may refer to:

- Kain (given name)
- Kain (surname)
- Kain Department, a department in the Yatenga Province of Burkina Faso
- Mount Kain, a mountain in the Fraser River Valley of Mount Robson Provincial Park, Canada
- Kaïn, a folk rock group from Quebec
- Kain (Legacy of Kain), the protagonist of the Legacy of Kain series of videogames
- Kain (Tenchi Muyo!), a character from Tenchi Muyo! in Love
- Kain, an archetype in Fire Emblem
- Kain, a former municipality part of Tournai, Belgium
- KAIN-LP, a defunct low-power television station (channel 55) formerly licensed to Natchitoches, Louisiana, United States
- A former name for Qaen, Iran
- Kain panjang, a traditional cloth from Indonesia, often patterned with batik or ikat'
- Kain the Dragoon from Final Fantasy IV.

== See also ==
- Kain bairns
- Kain XVIII, a 1963 film
- Rosati-Kain High School, an all-girls Catholic high school in St. Louis, Missouri
- Cain (disambiguation)
- Cane (disambiguation)
- Kane (disambiguation)
