= Baloo Baleerie =

Scottish lullaby

"Baloo Baleerie" is a Scottish lullaby. The title is alliterative nonsense based around the Scots word for lullaby, "baloo". As it is based on a recording in the BBC Glasgow Archives made on 22 January 1949 on the Shetland island of Bressay, it is also known as "The Bressay Lullaby",. It was first published in 1951 by Alan Lomax. An English version, "Go Away, Little Fairies" has also been published.

== Lyrics ==
The first verse refers to the story of the changeling, whereby a fairy would secretly substitute its own offspring for an unguarded human baby. In the first verse, the fairies are told to leave, while in the second verse, guardian angels are asked to protect the child. The third verse advises the child to sleep softly.

Complete lyrics
Bressay Lullaby	Baloo Baleerie	English Translation	Go Away, Little Fairies
Baloo balilli, Baloo balilli, Baloo balilli, baloo ba Ging awa peerie fairies, Fae my peerie bairn, Ging awa peerie fairies, Fae wir bairn noo. Baloo balilli, Baloo balilli, Baloo balilli, baloo ba Dan come bonny angels, Tae wir peerie bairn, Dan come bonny angels, Tae wir bairn noo. Baloo balilli, Baloo balilli, Baloo balilli, baloo ba Dey'll sheen ower da cradle, O wir peerie bairn, Dey'll sheen ower da cradle, O wir bairn noo. Baloo balilli, Baloo balilli, Baloo balilli, baloo ba	Baloo baleerie, baloo baleerie Baloo baleerie, baloo balee Gang awa' peerie faeries, Gang awa' peerie faeries, Gang awa' peerie faeries, Frae oor ben noo. Baloo baleerie, baloo baleerie Baloo baleerie, baloo balee Doon come the bonny angels, Doon come the bonny angels, Doon come the bonny angels, Tae oor ben noo. Baloo baleerie, baloo baleerie Baloo baleerie, baloo balee Sleep saft my baby, Sleep saft my baby, Sleep saft my baby, In oor ben noo. Baloo baleerie, baloo baleerie Baloo baleerie, baloo balee	Lullaby baleerie, lullaby baleerie Lullaby baleerie, lullaby balee Go away, little fairies, Go away, little fairies, Go away, little fairies, From our home now Lullaby baleerie, lullaby baleerie Lullaby baleerie, lullaby balee Down come the pretty angels, Down come the pretty angels, Down come the pretty angels, To our home now Lullaby baleerie, lullaby baleerie Lullaby baleerie, lullaby balee Sleep soft, my baby Sleep soft, my baby Sleep soft, my baby In our home now Lullaby baleerie, lullaby baleerie Lullaby baleerie, lullaby balee	Hush-a-by, hush-a-by Go to sleep, go to sleep Hush-a-by, hush-a-by Go to sleep my babe Go away, little fairies Go away, little fairies Go away, little fairies My babe must sleep Hush-a-by, hush-a-by Go to sleep, go to sleep Hush-a-by, hush-a-by Go to sleep my babe Watch o'er him, blessèd angels, Watch o'er him, blessèd angels, Watch o'er him, blessèd angels, My babe will sleep Hush-a-by, hush-a-by Go to sleep, go to sleep Hush-a-by, hush-a-by Go to sleep my babe

== See also ==
- Christian child's prayer § Lullabies

== Bibliography ==
- MacGregor, Jimmie (1964). "Sleeve Notes". Scotch and Irish (Media notes). Robin Hall & Jimmie Macgregor. Decca. DECCA LK 4601 LP. Archived from the original on 2011-07-19.
- "The Bressay Lullaby". BBC Disc Accession #13199, recorded in Lerwick, Shetland Islands, January 22, 1949. Association for Cultural Equity. Archived from the original on 16 October 2013.
- Carlin, Richard (1985). The Lullaby Book. New York: Amsco Publications. ISBN 0-8256-2337-5.
- Sinclair, Elizabeth. "The Bressay Lullaby". Kist o Riches. Tobar an Dualchais.
