= Cayne =

Cayne may refer to:

- James Cayne (1934–2021), American businessman, former CEO of Bear Stearns
- Candis Cayne (born 1971), American transgender actress
- Cayne (game), a 2017 free video game, prequel to Stasis
