= Kane 103.7 FM =

English community radio station in Guildford

- Guildford, Surrey; England
- Frequency: FM 103.7 MHz

Programming
- Format: Electronic Dance, Trance, House, Hip-Hop, Drum & Bass, Breakbeat, Dubstep, Soul, Reggae, UK Garage, Grime

Ownership
- Owner: Simon Foster

History
- First air date: Early 1990s (as a Pirate); 8 August 2004 (with RSL); 28 October 2011 (with Community Radio Licence)

Links
- Webcast: Kane FM Media Player
- Website: www.kanefm.com

Kane 103.7 FM, also known as Kane FM, is a UK local community radio station, broadcasting on FM and online across Guildford in Surrey and in the surrounding areas.

== History ==
Kane FM started as a pirate radio station in the early 1990s. The opportunity arose in 2004 to prove the demand for the service through a Restricted Service Licence running 28 days.

It has since grown into a community radio station to benefit the youth of tomorrow. All profits generated are used to drive social gain and community cohesion. Donations can be made online via the official website. We welcome sponsors and new advertisers, please contact Kane FM through the web site.

On 24 February 2010 Ofcom awarded Kane FM with a Community Radio Licence, and the station successfully re-applied for National Lottery funding to build their new studios and office.

Kane FM officially begun broadcasting on 28 October 2011 on 103.7FM and online.

Kane FM Studio

== Sponsorship and advertising ==
Through advertising bi-hourly between shows, Kane FM also receive local sponsorship from businesses and services and trades in and around the Guildford area.

Local charity events and fundraisers are also advertised between shows, usually as pre-recorded public service announcements or described by the presenters as part of their show.

== Events ==
At Guilfest, a summer weekend event formerly held in Guildford, The Funky End Tent was presented by Kane FM – where a number of DJs, producers and MCs hosted several sets across a variety of dance music genres, as well as some huge names in music like Andy C and Benga.

In 2012 some of the Producers and DJs from Kane FM participated in the London to Brighton Bike Ride, and through advertising on their own shows accumulated over £2,000 in sponsorship for the British Heart Foundation.
