= Cain Creek =

River in South Dakota, U.S.

Coordinates: 44°16′26″N 98°09′47″W

Cain Creek is a stream in the U.S. state of South Dakota.

== History ==
Cain Creek has the name of John Cain, an early settler.

== See also ==
- List of rivers of South Dakota
