= Cains (law firm) =

Law firm based in Douglas, Isle of Man

Cains is a law firm based in Douglas, Isle of Man.

It was founded in 1899. It reached its largest size in 2008, just before the Great Recession, when it had more than 30 lawyers and a similar number of support and fiduciary staff in its head office in and its branch offices in London and Singapore.

Prior to the Great Recession, the firm concentrated on high-value capital markets, principally the AIM listing of Indian businesses. Following a series of ad hoc redundancies in 2008 and 2009, it presently has 24 lawyers, of whom 6 are directors (partners).

It is rated as tier 1 by both Legal 500 and Chambers legal directories

Cains won the 2007 Legal Week award and the 2008 Lawyer award for top offshore law firm.

The firm is regulated by the Isle of Man Law Society.
