= Laurie Kaine =

Australian rules footballer

Personal information
- Full name: Laurie Kaine
- Born: 24 February 1952 (age 74)
- Original team: Coleraine
- Height: 177 cm (5 ft 10 in)
- Weight: 76 kg (168 lb)

Playing career^{1}
Years	Club	Games (Goals)
1971–73	Collingwood	6 (0)
- ^{1} Playing statistics correct to the end of 1973.

Laurie Kaine (born 24 February 1952) is a former Australian rules footballer who played with Collingwood in the Victorian Football League (VFL).
