= Cain House =

Cain House may refer to:

- Cain House (Dayton, Oregon) - see National Register of Historic Places listings in Oregon
- Cain House (St. Marys, West Virginia), on the National Register of Historic Places in West Virginia
