= X-mini =

Xmi Pte Ltd
- Type: Private company
- Industry: Electrical/Electronic Manufacturing, Audio
- Founded: Singapore (August 2006; 19 years ago)
- Headquarters: Singapore,
- Key people: Ryan Lee (Founder, CEO)
- Products: Capsule speakers
- Website: x-mini.com//

Xmi Private Limited, is a Singapore technological company founded in 2006 by brothers Ryan Lee and Reuben Lee together with Barry Choo. Ryan Lee is also the current CEO of the company. Xmi focuses on multimedia products, including small portable speaker with high-quality sound. Xmi is more commonly known as X-mini which is the brand name of its products.

The main products that the company offers are compact and portable capsule speakers that have in-built rechargeable batteries which work mainly with smartphones, tablets and other smart devices. The newer capsule speakers produced by Xmi include Bluetooth capabilities which allow wireless connection with smart devices. Xmi managed to break-even on all first year expenses within three months of launching of its first X-mini™ Capsule Speakers. As of 2012, Xmi has sold close to three million units of the X-mini™ Capsule Speakers.

== Products ==
Xmi introduced their first X-mini speakers in 2007. The X-mini speakers had built-in rechargeable batteries to provide a direct energy source for the speakers.

In 2009, Xmi launched the second generation speakers with a new function called "buddyjack" which enables users to connect multiple capsule speakers to a single source of music.

In 2011, Xmi invested approximately $1million in a manufacturing plant in Shenzhen, China to help produce components and research new ideas and improvements for its X-mini™ products. The plant employs about 180 engineers and assembly workers.

== Overseas Market ==
Xmi currently sells in over 80 countries across regions like Asia Pacific, Australia, Europe, Latin America, Middle East and North America. In 2014, international sales of Xmi's products accounted for 95% of its total revenue. Since Xmi was established, it had taken a proactive stance on selling on the global market so as to have a larger consumer population. Lee understood that Xmi has to produce in large quantities to survive as a business. Xmi USA was officially incorporated in Los Angeles, California on 27 April 2012 which will serve the markets in North America and South America. After Xmi USA's incorporation, Xmi has managed to double its revenue in 2012.
