= Grassy Creek (Salt River tributary) =

Stream in the US state of Missouri

Coordinates: 39.4819906°N 91.0926382°W

Grassy Creek is a stream in Pike County in the U.S. state of Missouri. It is a tributary of the Salt River.

Grassy Creek was so named on account of bluegrass in the area.

== See also ==
- List of rivers of Missouri
