= Caner Çolak =

Turkish footballer

Personal information
- Full name: Caner Çolak
- Date of birth: 30 June 1991 (age 35)
- Place of birth: Samsun, Turkey
- Height: 1.90 m (6 ft 3 in)
- Position: Forward

Team information
- Current team: Anadolu Üniversitesi

Youth career
- 2003–2007: Kadıköyspor
- 2007–2008: Samsunspor

Senior career*
Years	Team	Apps	(Gls)
2008–2011	Samsunspor	8	(0)
2010–2011	→ Mardinspor (loan)	10	(0)
2011–2012	Siirtspor	6	(0)
2012	Sivas Belediye Spor	12	(2)
2012–2013	Diyarbakır BB	10	(0)
2013–2014	Erzincan Refahiyespor	3	(0)
2014–2015	1930 Bafraspor	12	(4)
2015–2016	Güzelorduspor	22	(16)
2016–2017	Serhat Ardahanspor	11	(5)
2017	Maltepespor		
2018	Igdir Aras Spor		
2018–2019	Altinordu Belediyespor	22	(13)
2019–	Anadolu Üniversitesi	21	(9)
- * Club domestic league appearances and goals as of 15 March 2020

Caner Çolak (born 30 June 1991) is a Turkish professional footballer who plays as a forward for Anadolu Üniversitesi.
