= Franz Kain =

Franz Kain (10 January 1922 – 27 October 1997) was an Austrian writer and politician.

He was born in Bad Goisern and was educated locally. He apprenticed as a carpenter but quit and worked as a woodcutter. At the age of 14, he was arrested for distributing leaflets for the communist youth organization and imprisoned for three weeks. Following the Anschluss, he was arrested again in 1941 and was later pressed into service in the German 999th Light Afrika Division. From April 1942 to March 1946, he was held in custody by the Americans as a prisoner of war.

When he returned to Austria, Kain began working as a journalist for the newspaper Die Neue Zeit in Linz. From 1953 to 1956, he was a correspondent for the newspaper Volksstimme in Berlin.

He married Margit Gröblinger in 1961. The couple's daughter Eugenie also became a writer.

In 1954, his story "Die Lawine" appeared in the anthology Der Kreis hat einen Anfang. Kain's essays have appeared in various anthologies and journals. His work has been translated into Czech, Russian and Ukrainian.

He joined the Communist Party of Austria (KPO) in 1936. From 1977 to 1986, he served on the council for the (KPO) in Linz.

Kain received the Decoration for Services to the Liberation of Austria, the Silver Medal from the Republic of Austria and the Order of Lenin from the Soviet Union. For his literary works, he was awarded the Preis des Kulturministers of the German Democratic Republic, the Theodor Körner Prize and the Kulturpreis des Landes Oberösterreich.

Kain died in Linz at the age of 75.

== Selected works ==
- Romeo und Julia an der Bernauerstraße, stories (1954)
- Die Lawine, novel (1959)
- Der Föhn bricht ein, novel (1962)
- Die Donau fließt vorbei, short stories (1969)
- Der Weg zum Ödensee, stories (1973)
- Das Ende der Ewigen Ruh, novel (1978)
- Das Schützenmahl, stories (1986)
- Im Brennesseldickicht, stories (1989)
- Der Schnee war warm und sanft, stories (1989)
- In Grodeck kam der Abendstern, novel (1994)
