= Cain bairns =

Cain bairns or kain bairns were infants who, according to Scottish superstition, were seized by warlocks and witches, and paid as a tax or tithe to the Devil. Càin is a Gaelic word for a tribute, tax or tithe, and is the origin of the Lowland Scots term "kane", while "bairn" means a child.

The word was in use along the Scottish Borders, according to Walter Scott's Minstrelsy of the Scottish Border.

It is unconnected with Cain in the Bible.
