= Cane cholla =

Cactus set index

Cane cholla is a common name for several cacti and may refer to:

- Cylindropuntia californica
- Cylindropuntia imbricata, native to the southwestern United States and northern Mexico
- Cylindropuntia spinosior
