= Burney Island =

Island in Northern Territory, Australia

- Location within Australia

Geography
- Location: Northern Territory
- Coordinates: 13.59501535°S 136.23911621°E
- Adjacent to: Gulf of Carpentaria

Administration
- Australia
- State: Northern Territory

Additional information
- Time zone: Australian Central Standard Time (UTC+9:30)

Burney Island is an island in the Northern Territory, Australia.
