= Cain Dotson =

Swedish footballer (born 1971)

Personal information
- Full name: Cain Magnus Dotson
- Date of birth: 17 October 1971 (age 55)
- Place of birth: Haninge, Sweden
- Position: Forward

Youth career
- IF Brommapojkarna

Senior career*
Years	Team	Apps	(Gls)
1989–1999	IF Brommapojkarna	182	(44)
2000–2004	GIF Sundsvall	100	(18)
Total		282	(62)

International career
1987–1988	Sweden U17	8	(1)
- * Club domestic league appearances and goals

Cain Magnus Dotson (born 17 October 1971) is a Swedish former professional footballer who played as a forward.

== Career ==
Dotson was born in Haninge. He represented IF Brommapojkarna and GIF Sundsvall during a career that spanned between 1989 and 2004. A youth international between 1987 and 1988, he won eight caps and scored one goal for the Sweden U17 team.
