= Kane Falconer =

Australian rugby player (born 1997)

- Born: 7 June 1997 (age 29) Perth, Australia
- Height: 1.89 m (6 ft 2 in)
- Weight: 101 kg (15 st 13 lb; 223 lb)
- School: Christchurch Boys' High School

Rugby union career
- Position: Flanker / Number eight
- Current team: Canon Eagles
Senior career
Years	Team	Apps	(Points)
2016–2022	Canon Eagles	73	(35)
- Correct as of 24 November 2024

Kane Falconer (born 7 June 1997) is an Australian born, New Zealand rugby union player who last played for Canon Eagles a professional Japanese rugby union team competing in the Top League.

His usual position is Flanker, however he has also covered the Number 8 position.
