= Kane family =

Fictional family on the ABC daytime soap opera All My Children

- All My Children family
- First appearance: January 16, 1970
- Last appearance: September 2, 2013
- Created by: Agnes Nixon
- Introduced by: Bud Kloss
- Duration: 1970–2011, 2013

The Kane family is a fictional family on the ABC daytime soap opera All My Children, and reside in the fictional town of Pine Valley. The family debuted when the show debuted, being one of the core families on the show alongside the Martins and the Tylers.

== Story lines ==
The Kane family started when Eric Kane married Mona Kane. In a short while they had a daughter, the infamous Erica Kane. Eric never gave attention to Erica, abandoning her at age 9. Eric was a famous Hollywood movie director. At age 14, Erica was raped by her father's friend, actor Richard Fields, leading to the birth of her first child, daughter Kendall Hart. Erica gave her baby girl up for adoption because she was too young for a child and could not raise her and give her a good life.

Mona Kane divorced her husband, Eric, for abandoning Erica and her for a lounge singer named Goldie. Mona dedicated her life to raising Erica; however, love and dedication weren't enough. Erica blamed her mother for her father's abandonment. Mona soon enough fell in love again, this time to Dr. Charles Tyler; Mona was his secretary. The only problem is that Charles was married at the time to Phoebe Tyler. Phoebe's overbearing personality and alcoholism led Charles into the arms of Mona. Knowing the whole situation between Charles and Phoebe, Mona blackmailed Phoebe into divorcing Charles. After their divorce, Mona and Charles got married. Mona was always there for Erica. Erica never saw this as love, only as interference. Then Mona was diagnosed with lung cancer, which she thankfully overcame, and Erica finally saw how much her mother meant to her. Charles eventually died and struck Mona with great grief. Mona died in 1994 due to breast cancer. With her death, Mona took many dark secrets about Erica, and the hearts of her friends, family and fans, to the grave.

A way down the road, Erica met her half-brother from her father, Eric, both Erica and Mark shared resentment for their father and the two almost had an incestuous relationship (before knowing they were related). A woman came into Erica & Mona's life claiming to be none other than Erica's sister, Silver. Silver and Erica's then husband, Kent, began a torrid affair and when Erica found out about the affair she confronted Kent and in the heat of the argument the gun Kent gave Erica went off, killing Kent and the only witness happened to be Silver, who was going to turn her sister in. Erica went on the run, but her sister, Silver, turned out to be an impostor, Connie Wilkes. In time, a mysterious woman appeared in Pine Valley named Noelle Keaton, who later on was revealed as the real Silver Kane. Silver was brain washed and sent to Pine Valley to kill Erica for Eric's inheritance by her own mother, Goldie, and psychiatrist Dr. Damon Lazarre who was Silver's secret husband. Jeremy Hunter later saved Erica and Silver, starting the relationship of Silver and Jeremy. Later on, Natalie Marlowe killed Silver in an accident.

Kendall Hart came to Pine Valley in early 1993 as a teenage runaway to see her idol and birth mother, Erica Kane, but kept her true identity as Erica's daughter a secret at first. Erica hired Kendall as her personal assistant at her company, Enchantment Cosmetics. Mona Kane saw the birthmark on Kendall's neck and felt Kendall was the baby girl Erica gave up for adoption to the Harts. Kendall confided in Myrtle Fargate that Erica was her mother and asked her to keep her secret, all she wanted was to be Erica's daughter. After Erica's younger daughter, Bianca Montgomery, was involved in a riding accident and Erica raced to the hospital, a jealous Kendall blurted out the truth. Erica welcomed Kendall with open arms as her daughter and she and Kendall, with Bianca and Dimitri, worked to grow as a family. However, months later, Kendall wanted to find her biological father but Erica forbade her from searching for him. Kendall's step-father, Dimitri Marick, offered to help with her search in an effort to protect her and Erica. With Hayley Vaughan's help, they found Richard Fields, a B-List movie star. When Erica found out, she was furious and left Dimitri. Weeks later, when Kendall's adoptive mother called to ask her to come home, Erica gently implored Kendall to stop hurting herself and return to the Harts after telling her she could no longer try to be the fantasy mother Kendall dreamed her to be. Devastated, Kendall found Dimitri, who she had a crush on, and tried to seduce her step-father. He explained he only had paternal feelings for her and rejected her. Kendall was distraught and spontaneously lost her virginity to Dimitri's ward, Anton Lang. The next morning, a hysterical Kendall went to Erica the next morning and, upset about having sex and possibly being pregnant, implied Dimitri raped her. Enraged, Erica confronted Dimitri and stabbed him in the heart with a letter opener. At Erica's trial, Kendall lied on the stand and claimed to have only told her mother she slept with Anton and was afraid she was pregnant. However, when Richard Fields attempted to molest Bianca, Kendall saved her sister and admitted the truth in court. She was charged with perjury and sentenced to 30 days at a minimum security jail. She fell in love with Anton, became engaged, and was released from jail in April 1994. However, because Kendall kept plotting against her mother (writing a tell-all book about her mother with Del Henry and preventing her from reconciling with Dimitri), Anton left her. However, when Anton learned he was Dimitri's son, he dragged Kendall to get married in December 1994 as revenge against their respective parents. The marriage was annulled several months later after Anton discovered Kendall was plotting with Corvina against the Maricks to inherit Wildwind. In May 1995, Kendall fell in love with Del. When Kendall got news that her adoptive father had died and her adoptive mother, Alice, was too sick to take care of herself, Kendall made plans with Del to return to Florida in July 1995. Before she leaves, Kendall and Erica made amends and Erica forgives her for the harm she has caused.

In 1994, Mona Kane died due to breast cancer. Her death struck Erica extremely hard along with her friends and family, even enemy Phoebe Tyler mourned Mona, Phoebe shared a great moment with Erica, when Phoebe said that she would loved the chance to reconcile with Mona and how lucky Erica was to have a mother like Mona. Phoebe also stated that Mona raised a wonderful daughter, this pleased Erica a lot, knowing she finally got the respect of her idol.

Kendall returned to Pine Valley in 2002. She quickly fell in love with Ryan Lavery, the two became engaged. Kendall helped launch Greenlee Smythe's cosmetic company, Fusion Cosmetics alongside Liza Colby, Simone Torres and Mia Saunders. Kendall soon met the devious Michael Cambias, she fell for him and the two returned to Pine Valley. Erica knew right away that Michael was no good and exposed Michael in front of Kendall. Ryan returned to Pine Valley and the two fell in love once again which once again didn't last long. Kendall then met a mysterious man who claimed to be a Cambias, Ethan Ramsey, and the two became lovers. And it was proved that Ethan was indeed a Cambias, and then went by the name Ethan Cambias. Kendall helped Ethan the whole time. Kendall and Ethan eventually broke it off when Ethan chose Cambias over Kendall. In a spur of the moment and a little help from Ethan's choice, Kendall married Zach Slater, Ethan's father. After a while Kendall and Greenlee became best friends. Greenlee and Ryan became lovers which ticked off Kendall at first but soon got over it. Ryan was hell bent on not having kids after he saw how his brother became from their father, causing Ryan to have a vasectomy and Kendall and Simone helped Greenlee steal Ryan's sperm. Greenlee impregnated herself with Ryan's sperm and Ryan went ballistic when he found out. Ryan faked his own death by riding his motorcycle over a cliff. Soon afterwards Greenlee miscarried and thinking it was a good act of friendship, Kendall offered to carry the baby as a surrogate mother with Greenlee's egg and Ryan's sperm. What Greenlee didn't know is that the blackout threatened their plan, leading to Kendall using her egg knowing that Greenlee would kill to have Ryan's baby. Ryan soon returned with his sister Erin Lavery and brother Jonathan Lavery. This sent Greenlee over the edge but soon forgave Ryan and Ryan decided that having a kid wouldn't be so bad after finding out that Jonathan acted that way from a brain tumor. Greenlee then found out the truth, that the baby wasn't hers and Ryan's, it was Kendall's and Ryan's! Soon after learning the truth, Greenlee left town, devastating Kendall. Kendall soon gave birth to her baby boy which she named Spike Lavery. In December 2006 a murder spree was upon the women of Fusion Cosmetics and the killer was someone from Zach's past, making Kendall and Zach targets.

Bianca was born on February 8, 1988, to Erica Kane and Travis Montgomery. When Bianca was little, her father and an accomplice, Steven Andrews planned a fake kidnapping of Bianca, but instead Steven took advantage of Travis and really did kidnap Bianca. Erica found out and her and Bianca left to Center City where they befriended their neighbor who happened to be Steven Andrews himself! Jackson Montgomery came to their rescue and they moved back to Pine Valley. A while later Bianca was diagnosed with Reyes Syndrome (a rare disease). To boost up Bianca's spirits, Erica and Travis remarried which pleased Bianca. However, things got a little worse when Bianca saw her mother and her Uncle Jack kiss. This led to her burning her Uncle Jack doll which spread throughout the house and nearly killed her. Travis found out about Erica & Jack's affair and sued Erica for full custody of Bianca and won and made plans with his ex-wife, Barbara Montgomery, to move to Seattle with their children Matthew and Molly. Bianca thought that because of the divorce Erica wouldn't be her mother anymore, but Erica assured her that no matter what she'll always be her mother. Travis allowed Bianca to have extended visits to Pine Valley. One of Bianca's trips led to her meeting her sister Kendall Hart. When Erica's rapist, Richard Fields, came back to town he made a move towards Bianca but Kendall saved her in the nick of time. Bianca's next visit was not a good one at all. In 1994 her grandmother, Mona Kane died in her sleep of breast cancer. Bianca was so overwhelmed by her loss and furious she did not get to spend much time with her grandmother. Bianca was also kidnapped again this time by Dr. Jonathan Kinder, Erica's drug dealer. In self-defense, Bianca pushed Kinder down his stairs, Erica thought he was dead so with help from Janet Green and Skye Quartermaine they buried Kinder, however Kinder was very much alive. In 1997 Bianca ran away from Seattle to see her mother who was arrested for the kidnapping of Madelyn Grey, the daughter of Edmund Grey and Maria Grey, Travis and Barbara came to Pine Valley to take Bianca home, and when Travis told them that Erica would never see Bianca again, Bianca fainted and was rushed to the hospital. Bianca was diagnosed with anorexia nervosa and by early 1998 her condition became very serious which made Bianca to be fed by a tube. Bianca agreed to get help and moved to New England to a rehabilitation center.

Bianca came back to Pine Valley in 2000 after leaving in 1998. During which she came out as a lesbian, even with Erica's resentment. Bianca soon fell in love with Lena Kundera. In the summer of 2003 Bianca was raped by Michael Cambias. Bianca soon learned that she was pregnant with Michael's child. The rape was too much to bear for her, and she felt violated and scared. Bianca decided to abort her child, but after some talks with her friends she decided to keep the baby. Also during 2003, Michael Cambias was murdered due to the fact of him raping Bianca. The murderer was none other than Bianca herself when she went to confront Michael, he tried to rape her again, Bianca then shot Michael to death, she was not charged. Bianca decided to name her daughter Miranda after her favorite story, The Tempest. Bianca and her best friend, Babe Carey, went into labor at the same moment during one of Pine Valley's worst storms. The whole town was out looking for the two pregnant women. Bianca gave birth to baby Miranda and Babe gave birth to her baby son, Adam III (Little A). However something went terribly wrong, Babe's ex-husband, Paul Cramer, stole Babe's baby to give to his sister, and gave Bianca's baby to Babe. Months later, the truth was revealed and Bianca and Miranda were reunited. Bianca and her friend Maggie Stone became lovers after a long time. Bianca was lovers with Maggie's twin sister, Frankie. Bianca left Pine Valley again for Paris in 2005 only to return two years later. Bianca met a transgender rock star named Zarf and felt somehow attracted to him. Zarf finally revealed the truth to Bianca first telling her that all his life he wanted to be a girl, play with dolls, where dresses, do girl things but felt trapped in a man's body. Zarf started calling himself Zoe and has begun his transition towards womanhood. Bianca didn't accept Zarf at first, but the two are now close mates.

== Family tree ==
- Eric Kane (deceased)
  - m. Mona Kane [divorced] (deceased 1994)
    - c. Erica Kane
      - r. Richard Fields (deceased 1994)
        - c. Kendall Hart (Born 1970 change to 1976){given up for adoption}
          - m. Anton Lang [divorced; 1995]
          - m. Zach Slater [divorced; first time; 2005-2006] (deceased 2010)
          - i. Ryan Lavery
            - c. Spike Lavery (born 2006)
          - m. Zach Slater [divorced; second time; 2006-2009] (deceased 2010)
            - c. Ian Slater (born 2007)
          - m. Zach Slater [dissolved; third time; 2009-2010] (decease 2010)
      - m. Jeffrey "Jeff" Martin [divorced; 1971-1974]
        - c. Joshua "Josh" Madden (born 1973 change to 1980) {originally thought to be aborted}
      - m. Philip "Phil" Brent [divorced; 1975] (deceased 1981)
        - c. Unnamed child (deceased 1975)
      - m. Thomas "Tom" Cudahy [divorced; 1978-1981]
      - m. Adam Chandler Sr. [divorced; first time; 1984-1993]
      - m. Travis Montgomery [invalid; first time; 1987-1989]
        - c. Bianca Montgomery (born 1988 change to 1984)
          - r. Michael Cambias (deceased 2003)
            - c. Miranda Montgomery (born 2004 to 1997)
          - i. Zach Slater (deceased 2010)
            - c. Gabrielle Montgomery (born 2008 change to 2001)
          - m. Reese Williams [divorced; 2009-2011]
        - m. Travis Montgomery [invalid; 1989-1990]
        - m. Adam Chandler Sr. [divorced; second time; 1993]
        - m. Dimitri Marick [divorced; first time; 1993-1994]
        - m. Dimitri Marick [divorced; second time; 1994-1996]
          - c. Unnamed child (deceased 1996)
        - m. Jackson Montgomery [divorced; 2005-2007]
  - a. Maureen Dalton
    - c. Mark Dalton
      - a. Elizabeth Carslye
        - c. Julie Rand Chandler {adopted by Ellen Shepherd & Ross Chandler}
          - m. Nico Kelly [divorced; 1988-1989]
      - m. Ellen Shepherd [divorced; first time; 1982-1983]
      - m. Ellen Shepherd [married; second time; 1988]
  - a. Goldie Kane (deceased)
    - c. Silver Kane (deceased)
      - m. Damon Lazarre [dissolved] (deceased)
