= Bad Goisern am Hallstättersee =

Place in Upper Austria, Austria

- Municipality
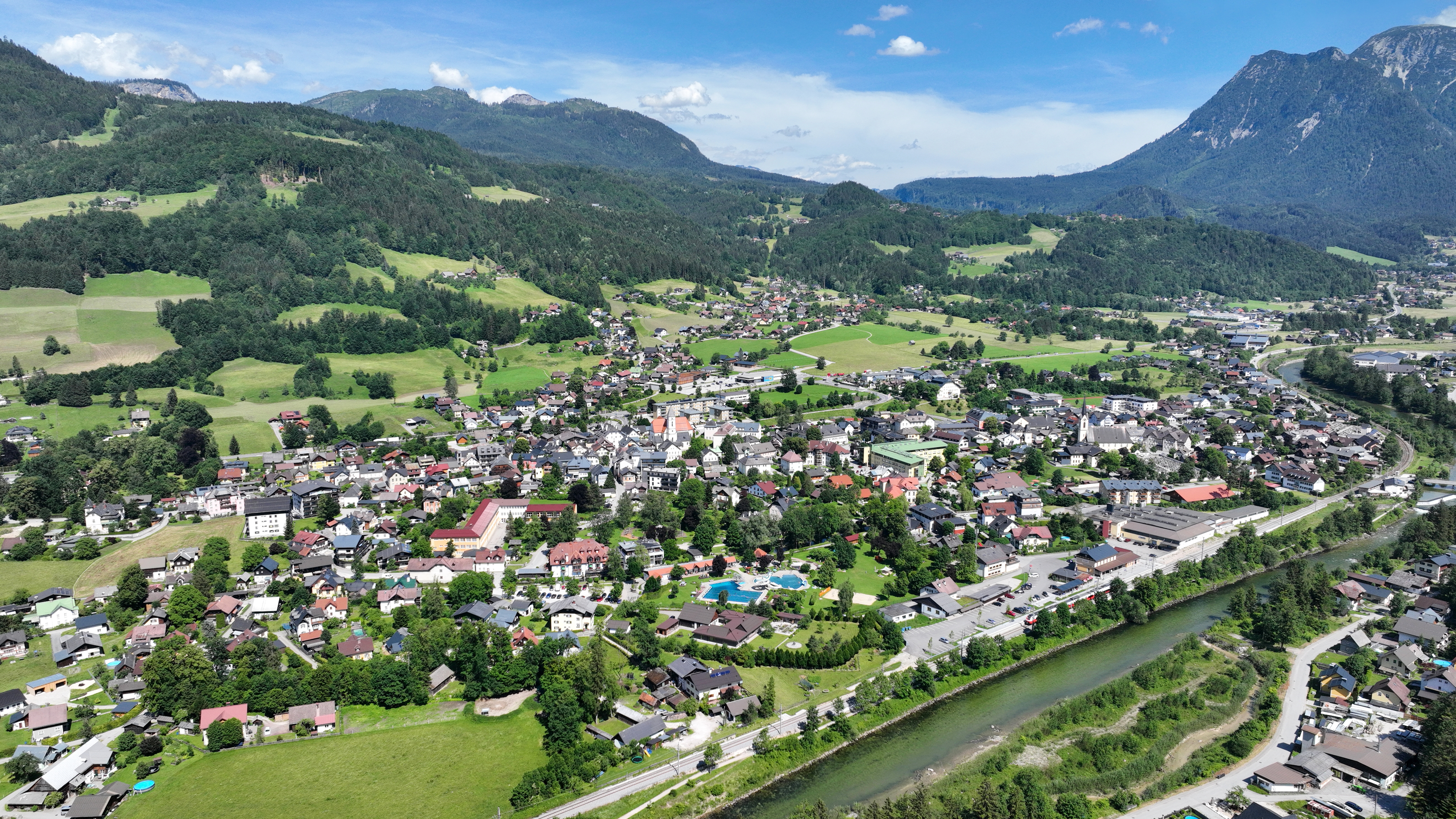
- West view of Bad Goisern

- Coat of arms

- Location within Upper Austria Location within Upper Austria
- Coordinates: 47°39′N 13°37′E
- Country: Austria
- State: Upper Austria
- District: Gmunden

Government
  - Mayor: Leopold Schilcher (SPÖ)

Area
  - Total: 112.55 km^{2} (43.46 sq mi)
- Elevation: 500 m (1,600 ft)

Population (2018-01-01)
  - Total: 7,450
  - Density: 66.2/km^{2} (171/sq mi)
- Time zone: UTC+1 (CET)
  - Summer (DST): UTC+2 (CEST)
- Postal code: 4822,4823
- Area code: 06135
- Vehicle registration: GM

Bad Goisern am Hallstättersee (Austrian German: [baːd ˈɡɔʏzɐn am ˈhalʃtɛtɐˌseː]) is a market town in the Austrian state of Upper Austria in the district of Gmunden. It is part of the Salzkammergut resort area. At the 2005 census Bad Goisern am Hallstättersee had a population of 7,578 inhabitants.

== History ==
Bad Goisern am Hallstättersee is a town with a long history. It was first mentioned in the 13th century under the name "Gebisham". In 1931 Goisern became a spa town and in 1952 it became a market town. Since 1955 Goisern is called "Bad" Goisern (Bad means bath in German and it is a title given by the government to cities with medicinal or thermal baths). A famous development is the "Goiserer Schuh", a good wearable mountain-shoe.

== Population ==
Historical population
Year	Pop.	±%
1869	3,961	—
1951	6,183	+56.1%
2001	7,609	+23.1%
2016	7,478	−1.7%

== Notable people ==
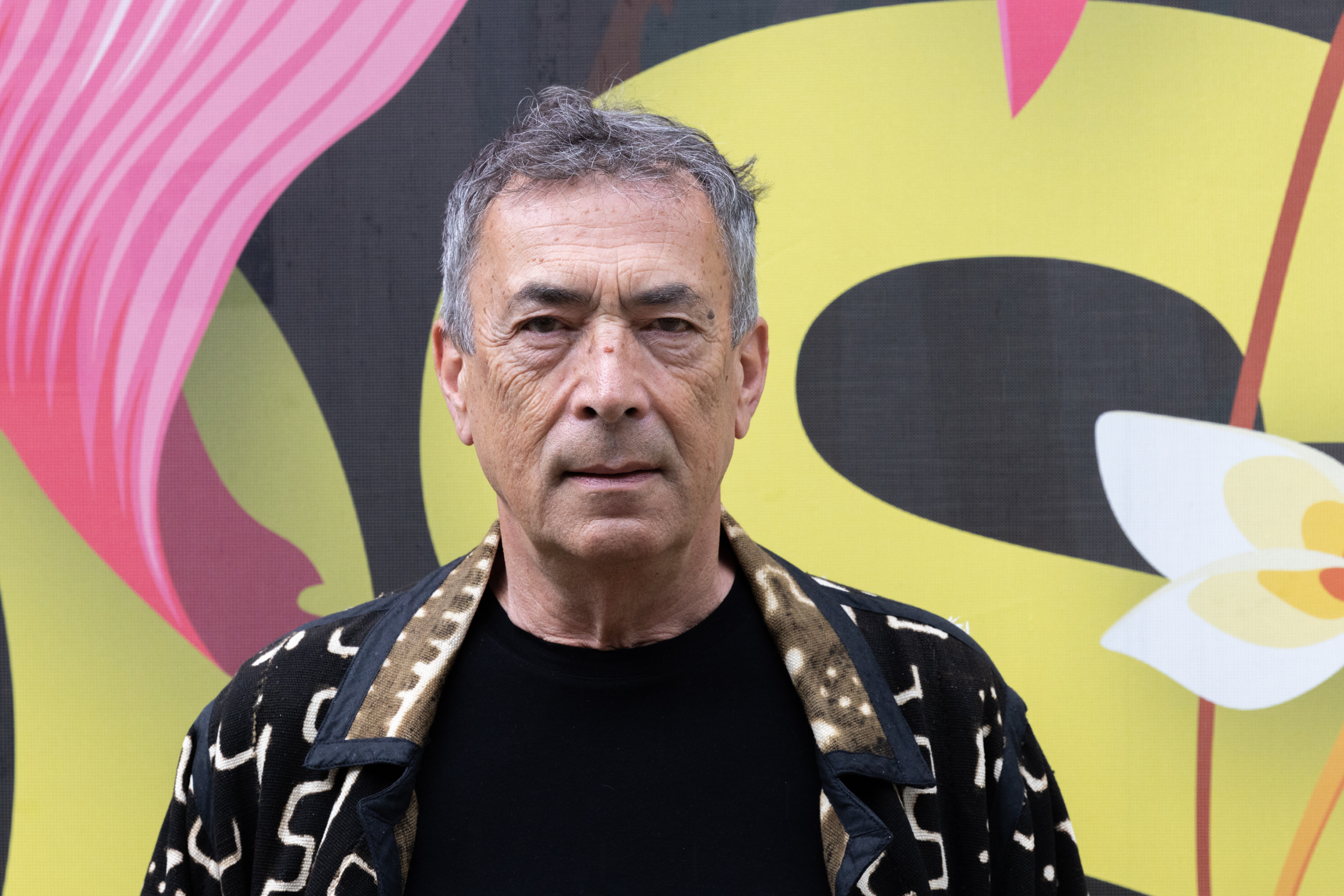
Hubert von Goisern, 2023

- Franz Kain (1922–1997), Austrian writer and politician (KPO)
- Herb Andress (1935–2004), born Herbert Andreas Greunz, Austrian film and television actor
- Ursula Haubner (born 1945), Austrian politician (FPÖ), older sister of Jörg Haider
- Wilfried (1950–2017), born Wilfried Scheutz Austrian singer-songwriter and actor.
- Jörg Haider (1950-2008), Austrian politician (FPÖ) and twice Governor of Carinthia
- Hubert von Goisern (born 1952), real-name: Hubert Achleitner, Austrian singer-songwriter and world musician.
- Johanna Maislinger (born 1985), Austrian aviator and engineer
