= Eugenie Kain =

Austrian writer (1960–2010)

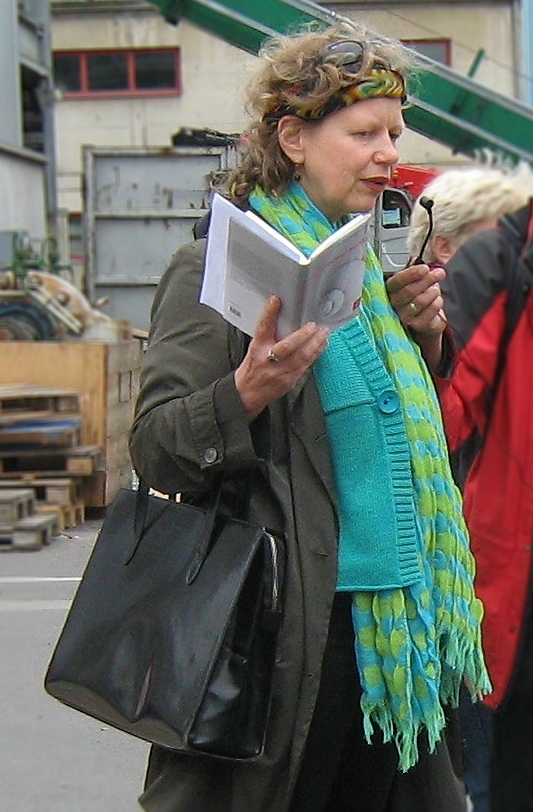
- Born: 1 April 1960
- Died: 8 January 2010 (aged 49)

Eugenie Kain (1 April 1960 – 8 January 2010) was an Austrian writer.

The daughter of Franz and Margit Kain, she was born in Linz. She studied art history and philosophy at the Catholic Private University Linz and German and Theater Studies in Vienna. From 1984 to 1990, she worked for the newspaper Volksstimme. She helped launch the Linz street paper Kupfermuckn in 1996. From 1999 to 2008, she was a contributor to Radio FRO,

In 1982, she was awarded the Max-von-der-Grün-Preis für Literatur for her work and then the Buch.Preis in 2003 for her 2001 novel Atemnot. She was awarded the Outstanding Artist Award für Literatur in 2006. In 2007, she received the Kulturpreis des Landes Oberösterreich for literature.

Kain was married to the musician August Maly, who died in 2002.

She was a member of the Communist Party of Austria (KPO) and ran as a KPO candidate for the European Parliament. She also contributed to the leftist newspaper Café KPÖ.

Kain died in Linz at the age of 49 from cancer.

== Selected works ==
- Sehnsucht nach Tamanrasset, stories (1999)
- Hohe Wasser, stories (2004)
- Flüsterlieder, stories (2006)
- Schneckenkönig, stories (2009)

== See also ==
- List of Austrian writers
