= Canebrake (disambiguation) =

A canebrake is a thick, dense growth of cane or sugarcane.

Canebrake may also refer to:

Places in the North America

- Canebrake (region of Alabama)
- Canebrake, California, an unincorporated community in Kern County, California
- Canebrake Ecological Reserve in Kern County, California
- Canebrake Canyon, California in San Diego County, California
- Canebrake (Ferriday, Louisiana), in Concordia Parish, listed on the NRHP in Louisiana
- Canebrake, Mississippi, a subdivision and golf course in Lamar County, Mississippi
- Canebrake, South Carolina in Greenville County, South Carolina
- Cane Brake in Edgefield County, South Carolina
- Canebrake, Tennessee in Rutherford County, Tennessee
- Canebrake, West Virginia in McDowell County, West Virginia
- Canebreak Branch in Anson County, North Carolina
- Cape Canaveral, a town in Brevard County, Florida, or "Canebrake", translated from the original Spanish Cañaveral

Animals

- Canebrake groundcreeper, a species of ovenbird
- Canebrake rattlesnake, a species of venomous pit viper
- Canebrake tree frogs, a genus of tree frog
- Canebrake wren or plain wren, a species of wren
