= Cane Creek (Indiana) =

Stream in Indiana, U.S.

Coordinates: 38°28′32″N 86°42′53″W

Cane Creek is a stream in the U.S. state of Indiana.

Cane Creek was so named from the wild cane which grew abundantly there. Cane creek is a clear stream that travels northeast to south west. The source of the river is located in Tipton county. cane creek is around 90 miles to the Wabash confluence. cane creek ranges from 2-4 feet deep.

== See also ==
- List of rivers of Indiana
