= Tina Cane =

American poet and activist

- Education: University of Vermont, Middlebury College
- Occupations: Poet Laureate of Rhode Island, poet, writing educator, writer
- Website: tinacane.ink

Tina Cane is an American poet, author, and activist in Rhode Island. She was the Poet Laureate of Rhode Island until March 2024; originally she was appointed in 2016.

== Early life ==
Cane was born in Hell's Kitchen, New York City, New York. She earned a bachelor's degree in art at the University of Vermont, studied at the University of Paris X-Nanterre and the Sorbonne University, and earned a master's degree in French literature from Middlebury College.

== Career ==
After graduating, Cane was active in New York City's Teachers & Writers Collaborative. Cane moved to Rhode Island in 2005. She founded Writers in the Schools in 2010, and remains the organization's Executive Director.

Cane became Poet Laureate in 2016. As Poet Laureate Cane is responsible for coordinating and selecting the youth poet laureate or youth ambassadors for the state of Rhode Island. Cane has a regular column in the Providence Journal. In 2017, Cane launched a statewide Poetry in Motion program where poetry is featured on digital screens in RIPTA buses. Cane also founded the Youth Poetry Ambassadors in 2017.

Cane's work features current topics and is often written free form. Her poems have appeared in The Literary Review, Barrow Street, The Cortland Review and Tupelo Quarterly.

== Works ==
- Body of Work (Veliz Books, 2019)
- Once More With Feeling, 2017
- Dear Elena: Letters for Elena Ferrante (Skillman Avenue Press, 2016)
- The Fifth Thought, 2008
- Are you Nobody Too? (Random House Books, 2024)

== Awards and honors ==
- Fellowship Merit Award, Rhode Island State Council on the Arts, 2016
