= Cora Cané =

Argentine journalist, librettist and writer

- Born: 1923; Rosario, Santa Fe
- Died: April 16, 2016 (aged 92–93); Buenos Aires
- Occupations: Journalist, writer
- Spouse: Luis Cané

Cora María Bertolé de Cané, better known as Cora Cané (1923 – April 16, 2016), was an Argentine journalist, librettist, and writer. Beginning in 1957, she wrote a section for the Argentine newspaper Clarín towards the end of each issue called Clarín Porteño, previously known as Notas del Amanecer, the oldest portion of the newspaper. She would write this section until her death in 2016.

== Biography ==
Cora Cané was born as Cora María Bertolé de Cané in Rosario, Santa Fe, Argentina in 1923. As a teenager, she moved to Buenos Aires, where she became a regular contributor to the newspaper El Hogar, through this medium publishing her first stories. On August 28, 1945, the Buenos Aires–based newspaper Clarín was founded, and that same day Cané was hired to work there. When Cora's husband Luis died in 1957, Clarín's founder Roberto Noble encouraged Cané to continue his section, Notas del Amanecer. Cané agreed, and so the section's name was changed to Clarín Porteño and it absorbed the Oído al pasar, Palabra olvidada, and Lo importante sections.
