= Max Clayton =

English footballer (born 1994)

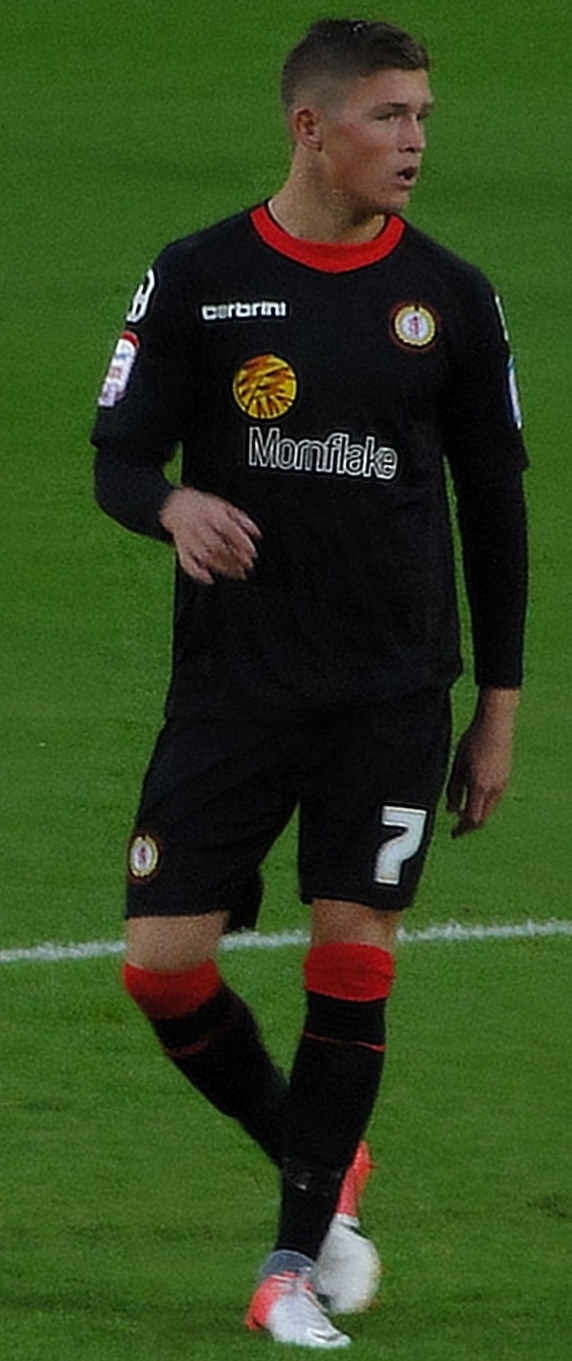
- Clayton in 2012

Personal information
- Full name: Max Clayton
- Date of birth: 9 August 1994 (age 32)
- Place of birth: Crewe, England
- Height: 1.75 m (5 ft 9 in)
- Position: Striker

Youth career
- 2001–2011: Crewe Alexandra

Senior career*
Years	Team	Apps	(Gls)
2011–2014	Crewe Alexandra	74	(9)
2014–2017	Bolton Wanderers	27	(2)
2017–2019	Blackpool	2	(0)
2020	Altrincham	1	(0)
Total		104	(11)

International career^{‡}
2010	England U16	5	(2)
2010–2011	England U17	21	(4)
2011–2012	England U18	2	(0)
2012–2013	England U19	4	(1)
- * Club domestic league appearances and goals as of 17:20, 26 October 2020 (UTC) ‡ National team caps and goals as of 14:43, 27 May 2013 (UTC)

Max Clayton (born 9 August 1994) is an English retired footballer, who last played as a striker for Altrincham. He has also represented England at under-16, under-17, under-18, and under-19 levels.

== Club career ==
=== Crewe Alexandra ===
Born in Crewe, Cheshire, Clayton started his football career at Crewe Alexandra Academy. In 2009, the club's technical director Dario Gradi revealed a Premier League club had attempted to poach one of their 15-year-old players, with Clayton named by the media. Liverpool had offered the Cheshire club a sum of around £1 million for the player's services. In March 2010, Clayton signed a long-term contract with Crewe.

Clayton made his debut for Crewe Alexandra in a 2–1 league win against Morecambe at the Alexandra Stadium on 22 April 2011, coming on as a second-half substitute for Shaun Miller. He made his second appearance of the season in a 2–0 away loss to Wycombe Wanderers, again coming on as a late substitute for Miller. Having made his debut for the club, Clayton signed his first professional contract with the club, which keep him until 2014.

He made his first appearance of the 2011–12 season on 6 August 2011, again replacing Miller as Crewe lost 3–0 away to Swindon. He began to get a regular run of games for Crewe, and scored his first goal in a 1–0 home win against Macclesfield Town in the JPT Trophy on 5 October 2011. His first league goal came in a 2–1 win on 19 November 2011 as he scored a 94th-minute winner against Morecambe, after England under-17 teammate Nick Powell had equalised for Crewe. He scored his second goal in a 2–0 home win against Accrington on 21 February 2012. On 10 March, he scored another 94th-minute winner as Crewe beat Gillingham 4–3.

On 16 May 2012, Clayton scored a vital goal in a 2–2 draw at Southend United to send Crewe to Wembley for the League 2 play-off final on a 3–2 aggregate score. Then in the 2012–13 season, Clayton scored twice in the first round of Football League Cup, in a 5–0 victory over Hartlepool United and then scored the only goal in the game, in a 1–0 win over Coventry City a few weeks later. His good display in August earned Football League young player of the month for August. Then on 7 April 2013, he scored in the 2013 Football League Trophy Final at Wembley Stadium, as Crewe beat Southend United 2–0.

After a prolonged absence due to a broken ankle sustained in November 2013, Clayton started negotiation for a new contract to stay at Crewe, believed to be a three-year contract. However, Clayton refused to sign a new contract at Crewe and left the club.

Clayton had trials at other clubs, including Wolverhampton Wanderers and Sunderland (he played in Sunderland's 5–1 pre-season victory over Darlington 1883 on 19 July 2014). Though Clayton left Crewe, press reports revealed the club would receive a six-figure compensation fee if he was sold to a foreign club.

=== Bolton Wanderers ===
In early September 2014, it was reported that he was expected to join Bolton Wanderers. On 18 September 2014, he officially moved for a fee of £300,000 which had been set at a tribunal due to him being under the age of 24.

He made his debut for the club on 4 October in a 2–1 home defeat to Bournemouth. After making four substitute appearances, he scored on his first start for the club in a 3–1 win at home to local rivals Wigan Athletic. After coming off injured in a 0–0 draw at home against Ipswich in December 2014, Clayton was ruled out for the rest of the season.

=== Blackpool ===
On 22 June 2017 it was confirmed that Clayton would join Blackpool on 1 July when his contract at Bolton expired. In May 2019, Clayton was released by Blackpool having only played seven games in his debut season and none in the 2018–2019 season due to continued hamstring problems.

=== Altrincham ===
On 20 August 2020, Clayton signed for National League side Altrincham. He was released two months later by mutual consent after making just one league appearance for the club.

== International career ==
He has also represented England at under-16, under-17 and under-18 levels, playing in the 2011 FIFA U-17 World Cup in Mexico. On 25 June 2011, he scored the second goal in a 2–0 victory over Uruguay in Torreón. He scored his first goal for the under-19 team on 24 May 2013 against Georgia.

== Personal life ==
His father Paul Clayton was a striker for Crewe Alexandra and his older brother Harry is currently a professional with Nantwich Town. Clayton grew up idolising Michael Owen.

Clayton says he is friends with Nick Powell, having played football together when they both five or six.

== Career statistics ==
As of match played 3 October 2020

Appearances and goals by club, season and competition
Club	Season	League			FA Cup		League Cup		Other		Total	
Club	Season	Division	Apps	Goals	Apps	Goals	Apps	Goals	Apps	Goals	Apps	Goals
Crewe Alexandra	2010–11	League Two	2	0	0	0	0	0	0	0	2	0
Crewe Alexandra	2011–12	League Two	24	3	0	0	0	0	6 (Note: Three appearances and one goal in Football League Trophy, three appearances and one goal in League Two play-offs)	2	30	5
Crewe Alexandra	2012–13	League One	35	4	1	0	2	2	4 (Note: Appearances in Football League Trophy)	3	42	9
Crewe Alexandra	2013–14	League One	13	2	2	0	1	0	2	0	18	2
Crewe Alexandra	Total		74	9	3	0	3	2	12	5	92	16
Bolton Wanderers	2014–15	Championship	9	1	0	0	0	0	0	0	9	1
Bolton Wanderers	2015–16	Championship	8	0	0	0	0	0	0	0	8	0
Bolton Wanderers	2016–17	League One	10	1	2	0	0	0	1 (Note: Appearances in EFL Trophy)	0	13	1
Bolton Wanderers	Total		27	2	2	0	0	0	1	0	30	2
Blackpool	2017–18	League One	2	0	0	0	1	0	4	1	7	1
Blackpool	2018–19	League One	0	0	0	0	0	0	0	0	0	0
Blackpool	Total		2	0	0	0	1	0	4	0	7	1
Altrincham	2020–21	National League	1	0	0	0	0	0	0	0	1	0
Altrincham	Total		1	0	0	0	0	0	0	0	1	0
Career total			104	11	5	0	4	2	17	6	129	19

== Honours ==
Crewe Alexandra

- Football League Two play-offs: 2012
- Football League Trophy: 2012–13

Bolton Wanderers

- EFL League One second-place promotion: 2016–17
