= 2017–18 Blackpool F.C. season =

English football club season

Blackpool
2017–18 season
- Owner: Owen Oyston
- Chairman: Karl Oyston (until 8 February)
- Manager: Gary Bowyer
- Stadium: Bloomfield Road
- League One: 12th
- FA Cup: First round
- EFL Cup: First round
- EFL Trophy: Third round
- Top goalscorer: League: Kyle Vassell (11 goals); All: Kyle Vassell (11 goals)
Home colours	Away colours	Third colours

The 2017–18 season was Blackpool F.C.'s 109th season in the Football League, and their first season back in League One following promotion from the 2016–17 Football League Two Play-Offs, against Exeter. Along with competing in League One, the club also participated in the FA Cup, League Cup and Football League Trophy.

The season covers the period from 1 July 2017 to 30 June 2018.

== First-team squad ==
No.	Name	Pos.	Nat.	Place of Birth	Age	Apps	Goals	Signed from	Date signed	Fee	Ends
Goalkeepers
1	Ben Williams	GK	(England)	Manchester	35	6	0	Bury	3 July 2017	Free	2018
25	Myles Boney	GK	(England)		20	4	0	Academy	1 July 2015	Trainee	Undisclosed
28	Joe Lumley	GK	(England)	Harlow	23	18	0	Queens Park Rangers	8 January 2018	Loan	2018
37	Christoffer Mafoumbi	GK	(Republic of the Congo) (France)	Roubaix	24	6	0	Free State Stars	20 July 2017	Free	2019
Defenders
2	Kelvin Mellor	RB	(England)	Crewe	27	89	14	Plymouth Argyle	4 July 2016	Free	2018
3	Andy Taylor	LB	(England)	Blackburn	32	61	2	Walsall	1 July 2016	Free	2018
5	Clark Robertson	CB/LB	(Scotland)	Aberdeen	24	137	5	Aberdeen	1 July 2015	Free	2018
6	Will Aimson	CB/DM	(England)	Christchurch	24	69	0	Hull City	14 January 2016	Undisclosed	2018
12	Nick Anderton	LB	(England)	Preston	22	11	0	Barrow	1 July 2017	£75,000	2019
16	Curtis Tilt	CB	(England)	Walsall	26	45	1	Wrexham	1 July 2017	Undisclosed	2019
20	Ollie Turton	RB	(England)	Manchester	25	43	1	Crewe Alexandra	1 July 2017	Free	2019
Midfielders
4	Jim McAlister	CM	(Scotland)	Rothesay	32	80	1	Dundee	29 July 2015	Free	2018
8	Sessi D'Almeida	DM	(Benin) (France)	Bordeaux	22	27	1	Barnsley	19 August 2017	Undisclosed	2018
14	Jimmy Ryan	CM	(Republic of Ireland) (England)	Liverpool	29	38	3	Fleetwood Town	6 July 2017	Free	2019
15	Sean Longstaff	CM	(England)	North Shields	20	45	9	Newcastle United	21 July 2017	Loan	2018
17	Viv Solomon-Otabor	LW	(Nigeria) (England)	London	22	46	5	Birmingham City	26 July 2017	Loan	2018
23	Colin Daniel	LM	(England)	Eastwood	30	85	8	Port Vale	1 July 2016	Free	2019
24	Callum Cooke	AM	(England)	Peterlee	21	33	2	Middlesbrough	18 July 2017	Loan	2018
44	Jay Spearing	DM	(England)	Wallasey	29	34	0	Bolton Wanderers	4 October 2017	Free	2018
Forwards
7	Kyle Vassell	CF	(England)	Milton Keynes	26	71	24	Peterborough United	1 July 2016	Free	2018
9	Mark Cullen	CF	(England)	Ashington	26	92	22	Luton Town	30 June 2015	£180,000	2018
10	Max Clayton	SS	(England)	Crewe	23	7	1	Bolton Wanderers	1 July 2017	Free	2019
11	Armand Gnanduillet	CF	(Ivory Coast) (France)	Angers	25	57	10	Leyton Orient	19 August 2016	Free	2018
18	Danny Philliskirk	CF	(England)	Oldham	27	72	11	Oldham Athletic	7 January 2016	Undisclosed	2018
19	Jamille Matt	CF	(Jamaica)		28	39	3	Fleetwood Town	1 July 2016	Free	2018
21	Dolly Menga	CF	(Angola)	Verviers	25	8	0	Free agent	10 November 2017	Free	2018
22	Dan Agyei	CF	(England)	Kingston upon Thames	21	9	0	Burnley	18 January 2018	Loan	2018
27	Scott Quigley	CF	(England)	Shrewsbury	25	8	0	The New Saints	16 August 2017	£35,000	2019
30	Nathan Delfouneso	CF	(England)	Birmingham	27	120	22	Swindon Town	21 January 2017	Free	2018
32	Rowan Roache	CF	(Republic of Ireland)		18	5	0	Academy	5 December 2016	Trainee	2019
36	Raúl Correia	CF	(Angola)		25	1	0	Radcliffe Borough	31 January 2017	Undisclosed	2018

== Statistics ==
As of 6 May 2018

No.	Pos	Nat	Player	Total		League One		FA Cup		League Cup		League Trophy	
No.	Pos	Nat	Player	Apps	Goals	Apps	Goals	Apps	Goals	Apps	Goals	Apps	Goals
1	GK	(England) ENG	Ben Williams	6	0	3	0	0	0	1	0	2	0
2	DF	(England) ENG	Kelvin Mellor	34	6	26+3	5	1	0	0	0	4	1
3	DF	(England) ENG	Andy Taylor	13	0	4+3	0	1	0	1	0	3+1	0
4	MF	(Scotland) SCO	Jim McAlister	2	0	0+1	0	0	0	0	0	0+1	0
5	DF	(Scotland) SCO	Clark Robertson	40	3	39	3	0	0	0	0	1	0
6	DF	(England) ENG	Will Aimson	22	0	13+4	0	1	0	1	0	2+1	0
7	FW	(England) ENG	Kyle Vassell	29	11	29	11	0	0	0	0	0	0
8	MF	(Benin) BEN	Sessi D'Almeida	27	1	12+11	0	0	0	0	0	4	1
9	FW	(England) ENG	Mark Cullen	9	0	3+6	0	0	0	0	0	0	0
10	FW	(England) ENG	Max Clayton	7	1	0+2	0	0	0	1	0	4	1
11	FW	(Ivory Coast) CIV	Armand Gnanduillet	31	5	9+17	4	0+1	0	1	1	1+2	0
12	DF	(England) ENG	Nick Anderton	11	0	3+1	0	1	0	1	0	5	0
14	MF	(Republic of Ireland) IRL	Jimmy Ryan	38	3	36	3	1	0	0	0	1	0
15	MF	(England) ENG	Sean Longstaff	45	9	37+5	8	0+1	0	1	0	1	1
16	DF	(England) ENG	Curtis Tilt	45	1	42	1	0	0	0	0	3	0
17	MF	(Nigeria) NGA	Viv Solomon-Otabor	46	5	35+9	5	0+1	0	0	0	1	0
18	FW	(England) ENG	Danny Philliskirk	26	6	7+12	2	1	1	0+1	0	5	3
20	DF	(England) ENG	Ollie Turton	43	1	41	1	1	0	0	0	1	0
21	FW	(Angola) ANG	Dolly Menga	8	0	0+8	0	0	0	0	0	0	0
22	FW	(England) ENG	Dan Agyei	9	0	1+8	0	0	0	0	0	0	0
23	MF	(England) ENG	Colin Daniel	45	4	43+1	4	0	0	1	0	0	0
24	MF	(England) ENG	Callum Cooke	33	2	18+11	2	1	0	0	0	3	0
28	GK	(England) ENG	Joe Lumley	18	0	17	0	0	0	0	0	1	0
29	DF	(England) ENG	Peter Hartley	2	0	0	0	0	0	1	0	1	0
30	FW	(England) ENG	Nathan Delfouneso	46	9	29+11	9	1	0	1	0	2+2	0
32	FW	(Republic of Ireland) IRL	Rowan Roache	4	0	0+1	0	0	0	0	0	0+3	0
35	FW	(England) ENG	Finlay Sinclair-Smith	2	1	0	0	0	0	0	0	0+2	1
37	GK	(Republic of the Congo) CGO	Christoffer Mafoumbi	6	0	4	0	0	0	0	0	2	0
43	DF	(England) ENG	Caleb Richards	2	0	0	0	0	0	0+1	0	1	0
44	MF	(England) ENG	Jay Spearing	34	0	30+3	0	1	0	0	0	0	0
Player(s) out on loan:
19	FW	(Jamaica) JAM	Jamille Matt	1	0	0	0	0	0	0+1	0	0	0
27	FW	(England) ENG	Scott Quigley	14	0	0+9	0	0	0	0	0	5	0
36	FW	(Angola) ANG	Raúl Correia	1	0	0	0	0	0	0	0	1	0
Player(s) who left the club:
21	MF	(Nigeria) NGA	Bright Osayi-Samuel	4	0	2+2	0	0	0	0	0	0	0
26	GK	(England) ENG	Ryan Allsop	23	0	22	0	1	0	0	0	0	0
34	MF	(United States) USA	Sebastien Des Pres	1	0	0	0	0	0	0	0	1	0

=== Goals record ===
As of 6 May 2018

Rank	No.	Nat.	Po.	Name	League One	FA Cup	League Cup	League Trophy	Total
1	7	(England)	CF	Kyle Vassell	11	0	0	0	11
2	15	(England)	CM	Sean Longstaff	8	0	0	1	9
2	30	(England)	CF	Nathan Delfouneso	9	0	0	0	9
4	2	(England)	RB	Kelvin Mellor	6	0	0	1	7
5	18	(England)	CF	Danny Philliskirk	2	1	0	3	6
6	11	(Ivory Coast)	CF	Armand Gnanduillet	4	0	1	0	5
6	17	(Nigeria)	LW	Viv Solomon-Otabor	5	0	0	0	5
8	23	(England)	LM	Colin Daniel	4	0	0	0	4
9	5	(Scotland)	CB	Clark Robertson	3	0	0	0	3
9	14	(Republic of Ireland)	CM	Jimmy Ryan	3	0	0	0	3
11	24	(England)	AM	Callum Cooke	2	0	0	0	2
12	8	(Benin)	DM	Sessi D'Almeida	0	0	0	1	1
12	10	(England)	SS	Max Clayton	0	0	0	1	1
12	16	(England)	CB	Curtis Tilt	1	0	0	0	1
12	20	(England)	RB	Ollie Turton	1	0	0	0	1
12	35	(England)	CF	Finlay Sinclair-Smith	0	0	0	1	1
Own Goals					1	0	0	0	1
Total					60	1	1	8	70

=== Disciplinary record ===
As of 6 May 2018

Rank	No.	Nat.	Po.	Name	League One			FA Cup			League Cup			League Trophy			Total		
Rank	No.	Nat.	Po.	Name	Booked	(yellow card) (yellow-red card)	Sent off (straight red)	Booked	(yellow card) (yellow-red card)	Sent off (straight red)	Booked	(yellow card) (yellow-red card)	Sent off (straight red)	Booked	(yellow card) (yellow-red card)	Sent off (straight red)	Booked	(yellow card) (yellow-red card)	Sent off (straight red)
1	16	(England)	CB	Curtis Tilt	12	0	0	0	0	0	0	0	0	0	0	0	12	0	0
2	14	(Republic of Ireland)	CM	Jimmy Ryan	10	0	0	0	0	0	0	0	0	0	0	0	10	0	0
3	23	(England)	LM	Colin Daniel	7	0	0	0	0	0	0	0	0	0	0	0	7	0	0
4	30	(England)	CF	Nathan Delfouneso	4	0	0	0	0	0	0	0	0	1	0	0	5	0	0
5	2	(England)	RB	Kelvin Mellor	3	0	0	0	0	0	0	0	0	1	0	0	4	0	0
5	20	(England)	RB	Ollie Turton	3	0	0	0	0	0	0	0	0	1	0	0	4	0	0
7	7	(England)	CF	Kyle Vassell	3	0	0	0	0	0	0	0	0	0	0	0	3	0	0
7	8	(England)	DM	Sessi D'Almeida	2	0	0	0	0	0	0	0	0	1	0	0	3	0	0
7	44	(England)	DM	Jay Spearing	3	0	0	0	0	0	0	0	0	0	0	0	3	0	0
10	11	(Ivory Coast)	CF	Armand Gnanduillet	1	0	0	1	0	0	0	0	0	0	0	0	2	0	0
10	17	(Nigeria)	LW	Viv Solomon-Otabor	2	0	0	0	0	0	0	0	0	0	0	0	2	0	0
10	28	(England)	GK	Joe Lumley	2	0	0	0	0	0	0	0	0	0	0	0	2	0	0
13	5	(Scotland)	CB	Clark Robertson	1	0	0	0	0	0	0	0	0	0	0	0	1	0	0
13	15	(England)	CM	Sean Longstaff	1	0	0	0	0	0	0	0	0	0	0	0	1	0	0
13	18	(England)	CF	Danny Philliskirk	1	0	0	0	0	0	0	0	0	0	0	0	1	0	0
13	21	(Angola)	CF	Dolly Menga	1	0	0	0	0	0	0	0	0	0	0	0	1	0	0
13	24	(England)	AM	Callum Cooke	1	0	0	0	0	0	0	0	0	0	0	0	1	0	0
13	37	(Republic of the Congo)	GK	Christoffer Mafoumbi	1	0	0	0	0	0	0	0	0	0	0	0	1	0	0
13	43	(England)	RB	Caleb Richards	0	0	0	0	0	0	0	0	0	1	0	0	1	0	0
13	—	(England)	GK	Ryan Allsop	1	0	0	0	0	0	0	0	0	0	0	0	1	0	0
Total					55	0	0	1	0	0	0	0	0	5	0	0	61	0	0

== Transfers ==
=== Transfers in ===
Date from	Position	Nationality	Name	From	Fee	Ref.
1 July 2017	LB	(England)	Nick Anderton	Barrow	£75,000	
1 July 2017	SS	(England)	Max Clayton	Bolton Wanderers	Free	
1 July 2017	CB	(England)	Peter Hartley	Bristol Rovers	Undisclosed	
1 July 2017	CB	(England)	Curtis Tilt	Wrexham	Free	
1 July 2017	RB	(England)	Ollie Turton	Crewe Alexandra	Free	
3 July 2017	GK	(England)	Ben Williams	Bury	Free	
6 July 2017	CM	(Republic of Ireland)	Jimmy Ryan	Fleetwood Town	Free	
20 July 2017	GK	(Republic of the Congo)	Christoffer Mafoumbi	Free State Stars	Free	
16 August 2017	FW	(England)	Scott Quigley	The New Saints	£35,000	
18 August 2017	DM	(Benin)	Sessi D'Almeida	Barnsley	Undisclosed	
4 October 2017	DM	(England)	Jay Spearing	Bolton Wanderers	Free	
10 November 2017	CF	(Angola)	Dolly Menga	Braga	Free	

=== Transfers out ===
Date from	Position	Nationality	Name	To	Fee	Ref.
1 July 2017	DM	(Scotland)	Ian Black	Skelmersdale United	Released	(Note: Ian Black joined Skelmersdale United following his release.)
1 July 2017	CM	(New Zealand)	Henry Cameron	Limerick	Released	(Note: Henry Cameron joined Limerick following his release.)
1 July 2017	LB	(England)	Luke Higham	Fleetwood Town	Released	(Note: Luke Higham joined Fleetwood Town following his release.)
1 July 2017	CM	(Scotland)	John Herron	Raith Rovers	Released	(Note: John Herron joined Raith Rovers following his release.)
1 July 2017	GK	(England)	Dean Lyness	Nuneaton Town	Released	
1 July 2017	CB	(Republic of Ireland)	Eddie Nolan	Crewe Alexandra	Released	(Note: Eddie Nolan joined Crewe Alexandra following his release.)
1 July 2017	CM	(England)	Jack Payne	Ebbsfleet United	Released	(Note: Jack Payne joined Ebbsfleet United following his release.)
1 July 2017	CF	(England)	Jack Redshaw	Salford City	Released	(Note: Jack Redshaw joined Salford City following his release.)
1 July 2017	GK	(England)	Sam Slocombe	Bristol Rovers	Released	(Note: Sam Slocombe joined Bristol Rovers following his release.)
1 July 2017	RB	(England)	Macauley Wilson	Bamber Bridge	Released	(Note: Macauley Wilson joined Bamber Bridge following his release.)
5 July 2017	DF	(England)	Christian N'Guessan	Burnley	Free	
6 July 2017	CB	(Scotland)	Tom Aldred	Bury	Free	
3 August 2017	CM	(England)	Brad Potts	Barnsley	Undisclosed	
1 September 2017	RM	(Nigeria)	Bright Osayi-Samuel	Queens Park Rangers	Undisclosed	
19 September 2017	CM	(United States)	Sebastien Des Pres	Fleetwood Town	Free	
24 January 2018	DF	(England)	Peter Hartley	Motherwell	Undisclosed	

=== Loans in ===
Start date	Position	Nationality	Name	From	End date	Ref.
18 July 2017	GK	(England)	Ryan Allsop	AFC Bournemouth	30 June 2018	
18 July 2017	AM	(England)	Callum Cooke	Middlesbrough	30 June 2018	
21 July 2017	CM	(England)	Sean Longstaff	Newcastle United	End of season	
26 July 2017	LW	(Nigeria)	Viv Solomon-Otabor	Birmingham City	End of season	
8 January 2018	GK	(England)	Joe Lumley	Queens Park Rangers	End of season	
18 January 2018	FW	(England)	Dan Agyei	Burnley	End of season	

=== Loans out ===
Start date	Position	Nationality	Name	To	End date	Ref.
15 July 2017	DF	(England)	Denzel Williams	Bamber Bridge	TBA	
21 July 2017	GK	(England)	Jack Sims	Skelmersdale United	TBA	
25 July 2017	CF	(Angola)	Raúl Correia	Guiseley	2 January 2018	
2 August 2017	AM	(Republic of Ireland)	Rowan Roache	Southport	TBA	
29 August 2017	CF	(Jamaica)	Jamille Matt	Grimsby Town	30 June 2018	
31 August 2017	CB	(England)	Peter Hartley	Motherwell	30 June 2018	
13 September 2017	DF	(England)	Caleb Richards	Warrington Town	8 October 2017	
2 December 2017	LB	(England)	Caleb Richards	Southport	2 January 2018	

== Competitions ==
=== Friendlies ===
As of 1 June 2017, Blackpool have announced five pre-season friendlies against Southport, Macclesfield Town, Salford City, Radcliffe Borough and Chorley.

7 July 2017	Dundee United	1–0	Blackpool	St Andrews, Scotland
14:00 BST	Fraser	Report		Attendance: 0

15 July 2017	Southport	1–3	Blackpool	Blowick
15:00 BST	Anderson	Report	Vassell; Gnanduillet; Osayi-Samuel (pen.)	Stadium: Haig Avenue

22 July 2017	Salford City	3–4	Blackpool	Salford
15:00 BST	Redshaw (?); Nottingham (?)	Report	Vassell (?); Potts (?); Osayi-Samuel (?); Clayton (?)	Stadium: Moor Lane

22 July 2017	Radcliffe Borough	0–7	Blackpool	Radcliffe
15:00 BST		Report	Delfouneso 21', 30', 54'; Matt 24'; Cullen 78', 81'; Philliskirk 86'	Stadium: NeuVen Stadium

25 July 2017	Chorley	0–3	Blackpool	Chorley
19:45 BST		Report	Philliskirk 34'; Cullen 47', 66'	Stadium: Victory Park

29 July 2017	Macclesfield Town	0–2	Blackpool	Macclesfield
15:00 BST		Report	Cullen 58', 68'	Stadium: Moss Rose

=== League One ===
==== League table ====
Pos	Team	Pld	W	D	L	GF	GA	GD	Pts
10	Southend United	46	17	12	17	58	62	−4	63
11	Bradford City	46	18	9	19	57	67	−10	63
12	Blackpool	46	15	15	16	60	55	+5	60
13	Bristol Rovers	46	16	11	19	60	66	−6	59
14	Fleetwood Town	46	16	9	21	59	68	−9	57

Source: BBC Sport
Rules for classification: 1) Points; 2) Goal difference; 3) Number of goals scored

==== Results summary ====
Overall								Home						Away					
Pld	W	D	L	GF	GA	GD	Pts	W	D	L	GF	GA	GD	W	D	L	GF	GA	GD
28	8	9	11	34	38	−4	33	5	4	5	20	21	−1	3	5	6	14	17	−3

Last updated: 13 January 2018.

==== Results by matchday ====
Matchday	1	2	3	4	5	6	7	8	9	10	11	12	13	14	15	16	17	18	19	20	21	22	23	24	25	26	27	28	29	30	31	32	33	34	35	36	37	38	39	40	41	42	43	44	45	46
Ground	A	H	A	H	H	A	A	H	A	H	A	A	H	H	A	H	A	H	A	H	H	A	A	H	H	A	A	H	A	A	H	A	H	A	A	H	H	A	H	A	H	H	H	A	H	A
Result	L	W	D	W	W	D	W	W	L	D	L	D	W	L	L	L	W	D	D	L	L	L	D	L	D	W	L	D	L	D	D	W	D	W	L	W	D	D	L	L	W	W	W	W	D	L
Position	16	10	11	8	7	7	5	4	6	6	9	11	7	9	12	13	12	10	10	11	13	16	16	16	16	16	16	16	17	19	19	17	17	16	17	14	14	14	16	16	15	12	10	10	12	12

Updated to match(es) played on 22 October 2020. Source: Statto.com
A = Away; H = Home; W = Win; D = Draw; L = Loss

==== Matches ====
On 21 June 2017, the league fixtures were announced.

5 August 2017 1	Bradford City	2–1	Blackpool	Bradford
15:00 BST	Knight-Percival (yellow card) 34' (goal) 41'; Patrick 59'	Report	Daniel (yellow card) 40' (goal) 43'; Tilt (yellow card) 82'	Stadium: Valley Parade; Attendance: 20,804; Referee: Roger East

12 August 2017 2	Blackpool	1–0	Milton Keynes Dons	Blackpool
15:00 BST	Longstaff 6'	Report		Stadium: Bloomfield Road; Attendance: 3,412; Referee: Seb Stockbridge

19 August 2017 3	Doncaster Rovers	3–3	Blackpool	Doncaster
15:00 BST	Allsop 37' (o.g.); Marquis 45+1'; May 75'; Whiteman (yellow card) 85'	Report	Longstaff 38'; Turton 65'; Cooke 76'; Daniel (yellow card) 86'	Stadium: Keepmoat Stadium; Attendance: 7,558; Referee: Robert Jones

26 August 2017 4	Blackpool	2–1	Oldham Athletic	Blackpool
15:00 BST	Longstaff 6'; Vassell 15'; Daniel (yellow card) 90+1'	Report	Banks (yellow card) 25'; Amadi-Holloway 70'	Stadium: Bloomfield Road; Attendance: 4,642; Referee: Peter Bankes

2 September 2017 5	Blackpool	1–0	AFC Wimbledon	Blackpool
15:00 BST	Longstaff 52'; Tilt (yellow card) 69'	Report	Francomb (yellow card) 41'; Abdou (red card) 53'; Trotter (yellow card) 67'; Robinson (yellow card) 90+3'	Stadium: Bloomfield Road; Attendance: 3,457; Referee: Carl Boyeson

9 September 2017 6	Scunthorpe United	0–0	Blackpool	Scunthorpe
15:00 BST	Wallace (yellow card) 57'	Report	Ryan (yellow card) 38'; Vassell (yellow card) 66'	Stadium: Glanford Park; Attendance: 4,290; Referee: Andy Haines

12 September 2017 7	Plymouth Argyle	1–3	Blackpool	Plymouth
19:45 BST	Bradley (yellow card) 23' (goal) 49'; Edwards (yellow card) 45+3' (yellow-red card) 65'; Miller (yellow card) 60'	Report	Daniel 2'; Ryan 70'; Delfouneso 86'; Allsop (yellow card) 89'	Stadium: Home Park; Attendance: 7,411; Referee: Kevin Johnson

16 September 2017 8	Blackpool	3–1	Oxford United	Blackpool
15:00 BST	Vassell 6', 90+4'; Cooke 15'; Ryan (yellow card) 78'	Report	Ricardinho (yellow card) 31'; Ledson (yellow card) 57'; Henry 90'; Rothwell (yellow card) 90+6'	Stadium: Bloomfield Road; Attendance: 5,274; Referee: Darren Handley

23 September 2017 9	Bristol Rovers	3–1	Blackpool	Bristol
15:00 BST	Bodin 40'; Moore (yellow card) 45+1'; Broadbent (yellow card) 50'; Telford (yellow card) 75'; Lines (yellow card) 79'; Sweeney 84'; Harrison 90+3'	Report	Vassell 12'	Stadium: Memorial Stadium; Attendance: 8,431; Referee: Gavin Ward

26 September 2017 10	Blackpool	0–0	Rochdale	Blackpool
19:45 BST	Ryan (yellow card) 72'	Report		Stadium: Bloomfield Road; Attendance: 3,399; Referee: David Webb

30 September 2017 11	Southend United	2–1	Blackpool	Southend-on-Sea
15:00 BST	Wordsworth 5'; Leonard (yellow card) 31'; Cox 46'; Timlin (yellow card) 71'	Report	Vassell 56'	Stadium: Roots Hall; Attendance: 6,688; Referee: John Brooks

7 October 2017 P	Blackpool	v	Blackburn Rovers	Blackpool
15:00 BST				Stadium: Bloomfield Road
Note: On 25 September, it was announced the scheduled home fixture against Blackburn Rovers was postponed due to international call-ups.

14 October 2017 12	Walsall	1–1	Blackpool	Walsall
15:00 BST	Oztumer 18'	Report	Longstaff (yellow card) 25'; Solomon-Otabor 65'; Daniel (yellow card) 82'	Stadium: Bescot Stadium; Attendance: 4,503; Referee: Tom Neild

17 October 2017 13	Blackpool	2–1	Bury	Blackpool
19:45 BST	Mellor 38'; Delfouneso (yellow card) 65'; Tilt 73' (yellow card) 87'	Report	Aldred (yellow card) 13'; Beckford 58'	Stadium: Bloomfield Road; Attendance: 3,437; Referee: Anthony Backhouse

21 October 2017 14	Blackpool	1–3	Wigan Athletic	Blackpool
15:00 BST	Vassell 8'; D'Almeida (yellow card) 40'	Report	Toney (yellow card) 40'; Dunkley 45+1', 54'; Powell (yellow card) 69'; Byrne (yellow card) 70'; Perkins 82'; Hunt (yellow card) 90+5'	Stadium: Bloomdfield Road; Attendance: 5,817; Referee: Andy Haines

28 October 2017 15	Northampton Town	1–0	Blackpool	Northampton
14:00 BST	Hoskins 21'; Grimes (yellow card) 66'; Poole (yellow card) 80'	Report	Cooke (yellow card) 59'; Tilt (yellow card) 90+2'	Stadium: Sixfields Stadium; Attendance: 5,213; Referee: John Busby

11 November 2017 16	Blackpool	2–3	Portsmouth	Blackpool
15:00 GMT	Solomon-Otabor 74'; Hawkins 83' (o.g.)	Report	Pitman 52', 86'; Close 80'; Clarke (yellow card) 82'	Stadium: Bloomfield Road; Attendance: 5,032; Referee: Jonathan Moss

18 November 2017 17	Peterborough United	0–1	Blackpool	Peterborough
15:00 GMT	Tafazolli (yellow card) 38'	Report	Vassell 21'; Turton (yellow card) 72'; Solomon-Otabor (yellow card) 82'	Stadium: London Road Stadium; Attendance: 5,254; Referee: Trevor Kettle

21 November 2017 18	Blackpool	1–1	Gillingham	Blackpool
19:45 GMT	Vassell 41'	Report	Hessenthaler (yellow card) 70'; Eaves 90'	Stadium: Bloomfield Road; Attendance: 2,650; Referee: Darren Drysdale

25 November 2017 19	Fleetwood Town	0–0	Blackpool	Fleetwood
15:00 GMT	Bolger (yellow card) 90+1'	Report		Stadium: Highbury Stadium; Attendance: 5,035; Referee: Oliver Langford

28 November 2017 20	Blackpool	2–4	Blackburn Rovers	Blackpool
19:45 GMT	Mellor 29'; Ryan (yellow card) 42'; Philliskirk 75'	Report	Antonsson 25'; Smallwood (yellow card) 42'; Dack 45'; Mulgrew 63'; Downing 67'; Williams (yellow card) 78'	Stadium: Bloomfield Road; Attendance: 5,302; Referee: Andrew Madley

9 December 2017 21	Blackpool	1–2	Rotherham United	Blackpool
15:00 GMT	Mellor 21'; Daniel (yellow card) 63'	Report	Wood (yellow card) 28'; Ihiekwe (yellow card) 36'; Ball 76', 87'; Vaulks (yellow card) 82'	Stadium: Bloomfield Road; Attendance: 3,654; Referee: Peter Bankes

16 December 2017 22	Shrewsbury Town	1–0	Blackpool	Shrewsbury
15:00 GMT	Nolan 54'; Morris (yellow card) 81'	Report	Tilt (yellow card) 45'; Spearing (yellow card) 82'	Stadium: Montgomery Waters Meadow; Attendance: 5,620; Referee: (England) Andy Woolmer

23 December 2017 23	Charlton Athletic	1–1	Blackpool	London
15:00 GMT	Aribo 15'; Sarr (yellow card) 43'; Magennis (yellow card) 86'	Report	Gnanduillet 90+1'	Stadium: The Valley; Attendance: 10,172; Referee: (England) John Busby

26 December 2017 24	Blackpool	2–3	Scunthorpe United	Blackpool
15:00 GMT	Ryan (yellow card) 22'; Philliskirk 25'; D'Almeida (yellow card) 26'; Tilt (yellow card) 79'; Longstaff 88'; Robertson (yellow card) 90+4'	Report	Hopper 2'; Holmes 8' (yellow card) 74'; Adelakun 46'	Stadium: Bloomfield Road; Attendance: 3,446; Referee: (England) Ross Joyce

30 December 2017 25	Blackpool	2–2	Plymouth Argyle	Blackpool
15:00 GMT	Tilt (yellow card) 48'; Daniel 55'; Solomon-Otabor 90+4'	Report	Rúben Lameiras 39'; Carey 45'	Stadium: Bloomfield Road; Attendance: 3,417; Referee: (England) John Brooks (referee)

1 January 2018 26	Rochdale	1–2	Blackpool	Rochdale
15:00 GMT	Kitching 90+3'	Report	Ryan (yellow card) 4'; Delfouneso 54'; Mellor 67'; Mafoumbi (yellow card) 60'	Stadium: Crown Oil Arena; Attendance: 3,165; Referee: (England) Anthony Backhouse

6 January 2018 27	Oxford United	1–0	Blackpool	Oxford
15:00 GMT	Tiendalli (yellow card) 40'; Obika 80'	Report	Mellor (yellow card) 79'; Tilt (yellow card) 90+5'	Stadium: Kassam Stadium; Attendance: 6,775; Referee: (England) Kevin Johnson

13 January 2018 28	Blackpool	0–0	Bristol Rovers	Blackpool
15:00 GMT		Report	Clarke (yellow card) 40'	Stadium: Bloomfield Road; Attendance: 4,001; Referee: (England) Martin Coy

20 January 2018 29	AFC Wimbledon	2–0	Blackpool	Kingsmeadow
15:00 GMT	Trotter 49'; Pigott 77'; Soares (yellow card) 88'	Report	Delfouneso (yellow card) 79'	Attendance: 4,286; Referee: Darren Drysdale

3 February 2018 30	Bury	1–1	Blackpool	Bury
	Danns (yellow card) 53'; Cameron (yellow card) 57'; Miller 83'; Clarke (yellow card) 88'	Report	Longstaff 53'; Vassell (yellow card) 61'	Stadium: Gigg Lane; Attendance: 4,089; Referee: Jeremy Simpson

10 February 2018 31	Blackpool	2–2	Walsall	Blackpool
15:00 GMT	Delfouneso 37'; Gnanduillet 88'	Report	Edwards 28'; Guthrie 76'	Stadium: Bloomfield Road; Attendance: 3,404; Referee: Scott Duncan

13 February 2018 32	Wigan Athletic	0–2	Blackpool	Wigan
19:45 GMT	James (yellow card) 40'; Burn (yellow card) 56'; Grigg (yellow card) 89'	Report	Gnanduillet 3'; Mellor 37' Mellor (yellow card) 58'; Daniel (yellow card) 49'; Lumley (yellow card) 85'	Stadium: DW Stadium; Attendance: 8,302; Referee: Jeremy Simpson

18 February 2018 33	Blackpool	1–1	Peterborough United	Blackpool
15:00 GMT	Delfouneso 45+3'; Mellor (yellow card) 57'	Report	Marriott 21', (yellow card) 62'	Stadium: Bloomfield Road; Attendance: 3,286; Referee: Eddie Ilderton

24 February 2018 34	Portsmouth	0–2	Blackpool	Portsmouth
15:00 GMT	Lowe (yellow card) 17'	Report	Vassell 41'; Ryan (yellow card) 56'; Robertson 63'	Stadium: Fratton Park; Attendance: 17,895; Referee: Gavin Ward

10 March 2018 35	Blackburn Rovers	3–0	Blackpool	Blackburn
15:00 GMT	Dack 45'; Evans (yellow card) 48'; Armstrong 69', 90'; Mulgrew (yellow card) 85'	Report	Vassell (yellow card) 51'; Delfouneso (yellow card) 59'	Stadium: Ewood Park; Attendance: 13,230; Referee: Lee Probert

13 March 2018 36	Blackpool	1–0	Charlton Athletic	Blackpool
19:45 GMT	Ryan 90+1'	Report		Stadium: Bloomfield Road; Attendance: 3,216; Referee: Trevor Kettle

17 March 2018 37	Blackpool	1–1	Southend United	Blackpool
	Robertson 45+2'; Philliskirk (yellow card) 69'	Report	Fortuné 11'; Cox (yellow card) 15'; Turner (yellow card) 45+1'; Timlin (yellow card) 65'; Coker (yellow card) 84'	Stadium: Bloomfield Road; Attendance: 3,213; Referee: Andy Haines

24 March 2018 38	Milton Keynes Dons	0–0	Blackpool	Milton Keynes
15:00 GMT	Pawlett (yellow card) 60'; Aneke (yellow card) 82'	Report	Tilt (yellow card) 84'; Ryan (yellow card) 90+1'	Stadium: Stadium MK; Attendance: 8,094 (490 Blackpool fans); Referee: Graham Horwood

30 March 2018 39	Blackpool	1–2	Doncaster Rovers	Blackpool
15:00 BST	Turton (yellow card) 36'; Daniel 56'; Tilt (yellow card) 69'; Spearing (yellow card) 77'; Ryan (yellow card) 78'	Report	Rowe 43' 70'; Marquis (yellow card) 88'	Stadium: Bloomfield Road; Attendance: 4,533; Referee: Ollie Yates

2 April 2018 40	Oldham Athletic	2–1	Blackpool	Oldham
15:00 BST	Byrne 60', (yellow card) 90'; McEleney (yellow card) 54'; Gardner (yellow card) 71'; Edmundson (yellow card) 78'; Doyle 85'	Report	Vassell 37'; Spearing (yellow card) 81'; Solomon-Otabor (yellow card) 90'	Stadium: Boundary Park; Attendance: 4,309; Referee: Darren Drysdale

7 April 2018 41	Blackpool	5–0	Bradford City	Blackpool
15:00 BST	Delfouneso 16', 29', 70'; Solomon-Otabor 22'; Longstaff 80'	Report		Stadium: Bloomfield Road; Attendance: 5,337; Referee: Anthony Backhouse

10 April 2018 42	Blackpool	3–0	Northampton Town	Blackpool
19:45 BST	Gnanduillet 42'; Longstaff 62'; Ryan 74'	Report	Barnett (yellow card) 63'; Buchanan (yellow card) 73'	Stadium: Bloomfield Road; Attendance: 2,964; Referee: Chris Sarginson

14 April 2018 43	Blackpool	2–1	Fleetwood Town	Blackpool
15:00 BST	Solomon-Otabor 88'; Gnanduillet 90+4'	Report	Jones (yellow card) 35'; Coyle (yellow card) 59'; Eastham (yellow card) 68'; Burns 75'	Stadium: Bloomfield Road; Attendance: 7,371; Referee: Andy Woolmer

21 April 2018 44	Gillingham	0–3	Blackpool	Gillingham, Kent
15:00 BST		Report	Vassell 28'; Delfouneso 33' (yellow card) 67'; Spearing (penalty missed) 48'; Lumley (yellow card) 78'; Turton (yellow card) 80'; Mellor 83'	Stadium: Priestfield Stadium; Attendance: 5,580; Referee: Craig Hicks

28 April 2018 45	Blackpool	1–1	Shrewsbury Town	Blackpool
15:00 BST	Delfouneso 56'	Report	Jones 20'	Stadium: Bloomfield Road; Attendance: 5,825; Referee: Martin Coy

5 May 2018 46	Rotherham United	1–0	Blackpool	Rotherham
15:00 BST	Ihiekwe (yellow card) 20'; Vaulks 58'	Report		Stadium: New York Stadium; Attendance: 9,512; Referee: Ross Joyce

=== FA Cup ===
On 16 October 2017, Blackpool were drawn at away to Boreham Wood for the first round.

4 November 2017 First round	Boreham Wood	2–1	Blackpool	Borehamwood
15:00 GMT	Turgott 68'; Murtagh (yellow card) 74'; Smith (yellow card) 80'; Holman 88'	Report	Philliskirk 62'; Gnanduillet (yellow card) 90'	Stadium: Meadow Park; Referee: Chris Sarginson

=== EFL Cup ===
On 16 June 2017, Blackpool were drawn away to Wigan Athletic in the first round.

8 August 2017 First round	Wigan Athletic	2–1	Blackpool	Wigan
19:45 BST	Laurent 17'; Flores 45+1'	Report	Gnanduillet 59'	Stadium: DW Stadium; Attendance: 3,391; Referee: Chris Sarginson

=== EFL Trophy ===
On 12 July 2017, the group stage draw was completed with Blackpool facing Wigan Athletic, Accrington Stanley and Middlesbrough U23s in Northern Group B. After winning their group, Blackpool were drawn at home to Mansfield Town in the second round. A third round away trip against Shrewsbury Town was next on the cards for the Seasiders.

Pos	Lge	Team	Pld	W	PW	PL	L	GF	GA	GD	Pts	Qualification
1	L1	Blackpool (Q)	3	2	0	1	0	7	3	+4	7	Round 2
2	L2	Accrington Stanley (Q)	3	2	0	0	1	8	4	+4	6	Round 2
3	L1	Wigan Athletic (E)	3	1	1	0	1	5	6	−1	5	
4	ACA	Middlesbrough U21 (E)	3	0	0	0	3	4	11	−7	0	

Updated to match(es) played on 7 November 2017. Source: EFL.com
(E) Eliminated; (Q) Qualified to the phase indicated

29 August 2017 Group Game 1	Blackpool	1–1 (4–5 p)	Wigan Athletic	Blackpool
19:00 BST	D'Almeida (yellow card) 4'; Sinclair-Smith 87'	Report	Merrie (yellow card) 13'; Gilbey 63'	Stadium: Bloomfield Road; Attendance: 1,532
	Penalties
	Taylor (penalty scored); Clayton (penalty missed); Mellor (penalty scored); Delfouneso (penalty scored); Roache (penalty scored); Sinclair-Smith (penalty missed)		Power (penalty scored); Gilbey (penalty scored); Hunt (penalty scored); Maffeo (penalty scored); Barrigan (penalty missed); Laurent (penalty scored)

3 October 2017 Group Game 2	Accrington Stanley	1–2	Blackpool	Accrington
19:30 BST	Sousa 38'	Report	Philliskirk 33'; Clayton 88'	Stadium: Crown Ground; Attendance: 975; Referee: Stuart Attwell

1 November 2017 Group Game 3	Blackpool	4–1	Middlesbrough U21s	Blackpool
19:00 GMT	Philliskirk 24', 89'; Longstaff 43'; D'Almeida 56'; Richards (yellow card) 87'	Report	Armstrong 54'; Brewitt (yellow card) 85'	Stadium: Bloomfield Road; Attendance: 691; Referee: Martin Coy

6 December 2017 Second round	Blackpool	1–1 (5–4 p)	Mansfield Town	Blackpool
19:00 GMT	Mellor 38', (yellow card) 78'; Delfouneso (yellow card) 90+1'	Report	Butcher 88'	Stadium: Bloomfield Road; Attendance: 587; Referee: Sebastian Stockbridge
	Penalties
	Philliskirk (penalty scored); Cooke (penalty scored); Taylor (penalty missed); Delfouneso (penalty scored); Mellor (penalty scored); Quigley (penalty scored)		Digby (penalty scored); Benning (penalty scored); Sterling-James (penalty scored); Potter (penalty missed); Spencer (penalty scored); Thomas (penalty missed)

10 January 2018 Third round	Shrewsbury Town	0–0 (4–2 p)	Blackpool	Shrewsbury
19:00 GMT	Ogogo (yellow card) 40'	Report	Turton (yellow card) 54'	Stadium: New Meadow; Attendance: 1,362; Referee: Carl Sarginson
	Penalties
	Payne (penalty scored); Morris (penalty scored); Riley (penalty scored); John-Lewis (penalty scored)		Philliskirk (penalty missed); Cooke (penalty scored); Roache (penalty missed); Delfouneso (penalty scored)
