= Viv Solomon-Otabor =

English footballer

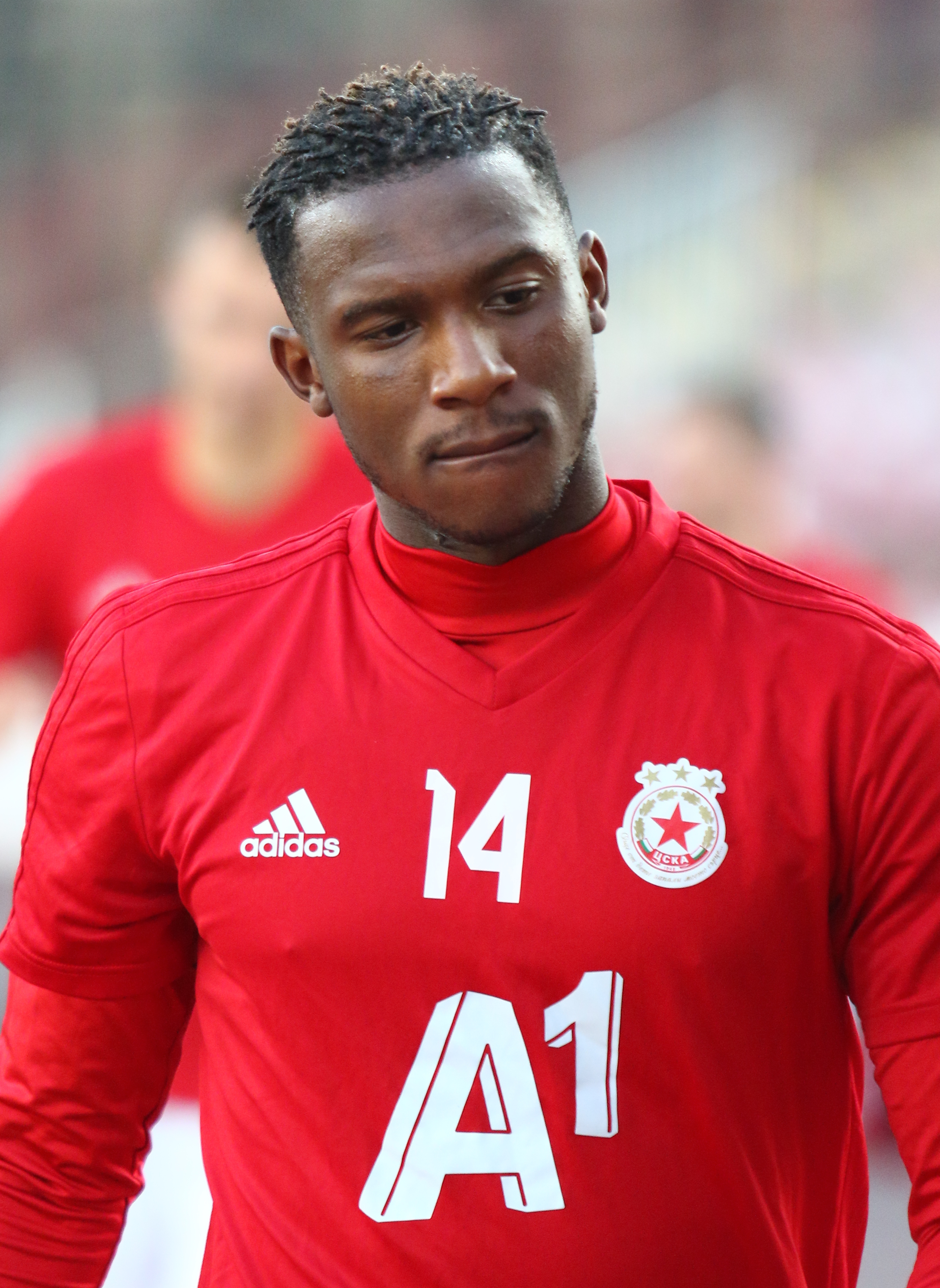
- Solomon-Otabor with CSKA Sofia in 2019

Personal information
- Full name: Viv Efosa Solomon-Otabor
- Date of birth: 2 January 1996 (age 30)
- Place of birth: London, England
- Height: 5 ft 9 in (1.75 m)
- Position: Winger

Team information
- Current team: Ningbo FC
- Number: 31

Youth career
- Hampton & Richmond Borough
- Crystal Palace
- 2012–2014: Birmingham City

Senior career*
Years	Team	Apps	(Gls)
2014–2019	Birmingham City	33	(2)
2014	→ Oxford City (loan)	12	(1)
2017	→ Bolton Wanderers (loan)	4	(0)
2017–2018	→ Blackpool (loan)	44	(5)
2019	→ Portsmouth (loan)	7	(1)
2019–2020	CSKA Sofia	19	(1)
2020–2021	Wigan Athletic	28	(2)
2021–2022	St Johnstone	7	(0)
2022–2023	Rukh Lviv	42	(3)
2024	Cangzhou Mighty Lions	19	(4)
2025	Al Orooba	11	(3)
2026–	Ningbo FC	8	(0)
- * Club domestic league appearances and goals as of 13:59, 29 May 2026 (UTC)

Viv Efosa Solomon-Otabor (born 2 January 1996) is an English professional footballer who plays as a winger for Ningbo FC.

He joined Birmingham City as a 16-year-old, and made his senior debut while on loan at Conference North club Oxford City in 2014. He first played for Birmingham in the League Cup in August 2015, and spent time on loan to League One clubs Bolton Wanderers in 2016–17, Blackpool for the 2017–18 season, and Portsmouth in 2018–19. He made 33 appearances in the Championship for Birmingham, and turned down their offer of a new contract in 2019. He spent the 2019–20 season with Bulgarian First League club CSKA Sofia before returning to England for a season with another League One club, Wigan Athletic.

Solomon-Otabor was born in England to Nigerian parents, and was an unused substitute for the Nigerian national team in October 2019.

== Personal life ==
Solomon-Otabor was born in London to parents originally from Edo State, Nigeria. He is the nephew of Nigerian international footballer Thompson Oliha, and his father, Victor-Banks Otabor, played domestically for Bendel Insurance, NNPC and Eagle Oil. He attended Bishop Thomas Grant School, Streatham, and supported Manchester United as a boy; his friends included fellow Anglo-Nigerian future footballer Joe Aribo.

== Club career ==
=== Early career ===
As a youngster, Solomon-Otabor played football with Hampton & Richmond Borough, and was a member of Crystal Palace's academy, before taking up a scholarship with Birmingham City in July 2012. In February 2014, he joined Conference North club Oxford City on a youth loan until the end of the season. He played 12 league matches, 7 as a member of the starting eleven, and scored once, in a 2–0 win away to Gloucester City, as Oxford City finished 20th.

Solomon-Otabor signed his first professional contract with Birmingham, of one year with the option of a second, in June 2014. In November, he described his strengths as speed, dribbling, and ability to play with both feet. He was a regular in the development squad over the season, and was a member of the team that won the Birmingham Senior Cup. His under-21 coach, Richard Beale, believed the player had the potential to progress to the first team but needed to work harder at the defensive aspects of the game.

=== Birmingham City ===
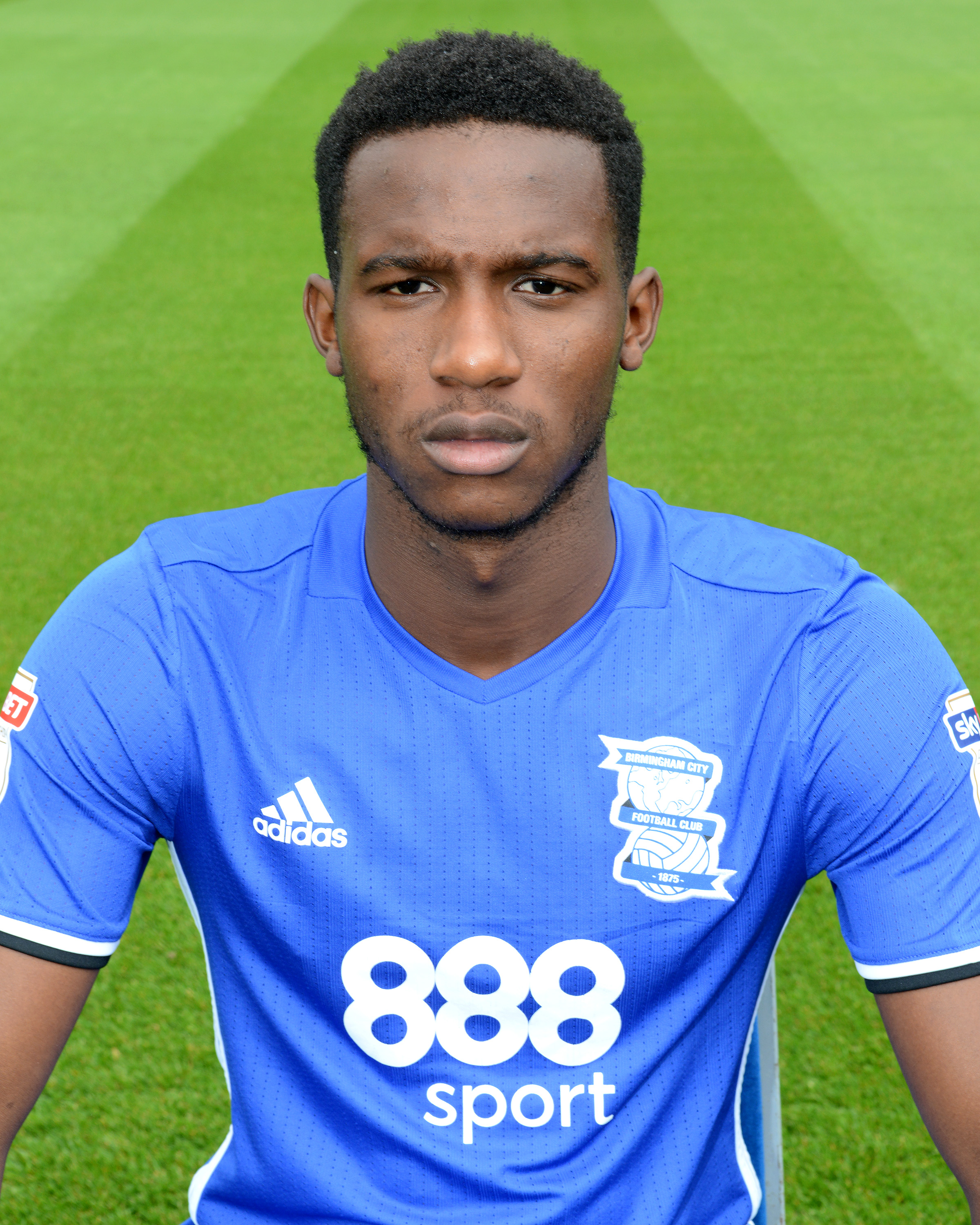
Viv Solomon-Otabor with Birmingham City in 2016

Birmingham took up the option for a further year on his contract, and he showed enough progress in pre-season and into the start of the 2015–16 season that manager Gary Rowett decided to keep him at the club instead of allowing him out on loan again. Rowett remarked on his physical development and his improved defensive work, rated him as "probably the quickest player we have got in the squad", and highlighted his having "roasted first team defenders in training". Solomon-Otabor was given a squad number "with a view to participation in" the second-round League Cup tie at home to Gillingham on 25 August 2015. He did indeed participate, as a second-half substitute, replacing Koby Arthur after 77 minutes. Birmingham won 2–0. He made his Football League debut on 15 September at home to Nottingham Forest, replacing David Cotterill for the last ten minutes of what proved to be Birmingham's first defeat of the season.

With Birmingham 3–2 ahead away at Fulham on 7 November, Solomon-Otabor came on as an 80th-minute substitute for Jon Toral. Deep into stoppage time, he scored his first senior professional goal, a solo effort that completed a 5–2 win: after a run down the left, "a neat turn that left Richard Stearman on his backside was followed by a clinical finish". After twelve substitute appearances in all competitions, Solomon-Otabor made his first start on 28 December, replacing the rested Demarai Gray for the visit of MK Dons. The Milton Keynes Citizen reported that Dons were lucky not to concede a penalty when a defender appeared to handle Solomon-Otabor's 36th-minute cross. Rowett "thought Viv looked a little bit nervous, which is understandable, but he's worked hard in the second-half and contributed to some of the moments and certainly the performance. ... Every time he comes on the pitch, he does what we ask him to do; he stays wide, he crosses the ball, he gets into good positions."

He remained in the starting eleven for the next match, at home to Brentford, with Gray about to complete his transfer to Leicester City of the Premier League, and a few days later signed a three-and-a-half-year contract, due to expire at the end of the 2018–19 season. Those were his only starts; he made eleven more appearances over the season, but all were as a substitute. Nevertheless, his performances earned him the club's Young Player of the Season award for 2015–16.

=== Loan spells ===
Having played little during 2016–17, Solomon-Otabor joined League One club Bolton Wanderers on 31 January 2017 on loan until the end of the season. Birmingham manager Gianfranco Zola hoped he would be able to progress a conversion from winger to striker. He made only four appearances, all as a substitute, before his loan expired.

In late July 2017, Solomon-Otabor signed for Blackpool, newly promoted to League One, on loan until 6 January 2018. He made his debut as a second-half substitute in the opening fixture of the season, and put in what the Blackpool Gazette called a "lively" performance in the next match, the EFL Cup defeat away to Wigan Athletic. He played regularly through the first half of the campaign, and his loan was extended to the end of the season. He went on to make 47 appearances (44 in League One) in which he scored five goals.

Behind Jota, Jacques Maghoma and loanee Connor Mahoney in the pecking order, Solomon-Otabor was used sparingly by Birmingham in the early part of the 2018–19 season. His last appearance was in November against Hull City: he came on in the first half for the injured Jota and was himself substituted after 65 minutes. Solomon-Otabor joined League One club Portsmouth on 31 January 2019 on loan until the end of the season. He did not become a regular in the side: he made seven league appearances, scored once, and played in both legs of Portsmouth's play-off semi-final defeat to Sunderland.

=== CSKA Sofia ===
On his return to Birmingham, the club offered him a one-year contract, which he chose to decline, instead signing a three-year deal with CSKA Sofia of the Bulgarian First League. He made 22 appearances in all competitions, scored once in 19 First League matches, and represented CSKA Sofia in the UEFA Europa League, before Bulgarian football was suspended in mid March 2020 because of the COVID-19 pandemic. Solomon-Otabor's contract was cancelled for financial reasons during the hiatus.

Following a controversial international match between England and Bulgaria in October 2019, he became a target for racial abuse from supporters of opposing clubs and of his own; the club itself spoke out in support of him.

=== Return to British football ===
Solomon-Otabor signed a short-term deal with Wigan Athletic, newly relegated to League One after entering administration, on 4 September 2020. He made his debut the next day in a 3–2 EFL Cup defeat away to Fleetwood Town. On 5 October 2020, Solomon-Otabor extended his contract with Wigan until January 2021, but soon afterwards he injured an ankle, required surgery, and his contract expired before he was able to play again. Having proved his fitness to Wigan's satisfaction at the end of January 2021, he signed on again to the end of the season, and returned to competitive action on 6 February. His first goal for the club opened the scoring in a 2–0 win away to Plymouth Argyle on 9 March. He finished the season with two goals from 31 appearances in all competitions.

Wigan made him an offer of terms for the coming season, but he had not accepted it by the time his existing contract expired at the end of June. After a period without a team, Solomon-Otabor signed for Scottish Premiership club St Johnstone on 24 November 2021 on a short-term contract until January 2022. After making two starts and five appearances as a substitute, he left the club upon the completion of his contract.

=== Rukh Lviv ===
In January 2022, Solomon-Otabor signed for Rukh Lviv of the Ukrainian Premier League. After joining his teammates at a training camp in Turkey, he had been in Ukraine for only one training session when 2022 Russian invasion of Ukraine led to the postponement of the football season. Travelling with two team-mates, Solomon-Otabor drove to the Polish border and managed to cross after a 10-hour wait, before heading to Kraków to fly to London.

=== Cangzhou Mighty Lions ===
On 29 February 2024, Solomon-Otabor joined Chinese Super League club Cangzhou Mighty Lions.

After a spell in the UAE with Al Orooba, Solomon-Otabor joined China League One side Ningbo FC in February 2026.

== International career ==
In June 2015, Solomon-Otabor was invited to attend trials for Nigeria's Olympic team, and trained with the team ahead of their 2015 All-Africa Games campaign.

In October 2019 he received his first call up for Nigeria, as a replacement for the injured Samuel Kalu for a friendly against Brazil in Singapore. He remained an unused substitute.

== Career statistics ==
As of match played 29 May 2026

Appearances and goals by club, season and competition
Club	Season	League			National Cup (Note: Includes FA Cup, Bulgarian Cup, Scottish Cup, Chinese FA Cup)		League Cup (Note: Includes Football League/EFL Cup, Scottish League Cup)		Other		Total	
Club	Season	Division	Apps	Goals	Apps	Goals	Apps	Goals	Apps	Goals	Apps	Goals
Birmingham City	2013–14	Championship	0	0	0	0	0	0	—		0	0
Birmingham City	2014–15	Championship	0	0	0	0	0	0	—		0	0
Birmingham City	2015–16	Championship	22	1	1	0	2	0	—		25	1
Birmingham City	2016–17	Championship	3	0	1	0	1	0	—		5	0
Birmingham City	2017–18	Championship	0	0	0	0	0	0	—		0	0
Birmingham City	2018–19	Championship	8	1	1	0	1	0	—		10	1
Birmingham City	Total		33	2	3	0	4	0	—		40	2
Oxford City (loan)	2013–14	Conference North	12	1	—		—				12	1
Bolton Wanderers (loan)	2016–17	League One	4	0	—		—		0	0	4	0
Blackpool (loan)	2017–18	League One	44	5	1	0	1	0	1 (Note: Appearance(s) in EFL Trophy)	0	47	5
Portsmouth (loan)	2018–19	League One	7	1	—		—		3 (Note: One appearance in EFL Trophy, two appearances in EFL League One play-offs)	0	10	1
CSKA Sofia	2019–20	First League	19	1	2	0	—		1 (Note: Appearance in UEFA Europa League)	0	22	1
Wigan Athletic	2020–21	League One	28	2	0	0	1	0	2	0	31	2
St Johnstone	2021–22	Scottish Premiership	7	0	0	0	—		—		7	0
FC Rukh Lviv	2022–23	Ukrainian Premier League	28	3	0	0	—		—		28	3
FC Rukh Lviv	2023–24	Ukrainian Premier League	14	0	0	0	—		—		14	0
FC Rukh Lviv	Total		42	3	0	0	—		—		42	3
Cangzhou Mighty Lions	2024	Chinese Super League	29	6	1	0	—		—		30	6
Al Orooba	2024–25	UAE Pro League	11	3	—		—		—		11	3
Ningbo FC	2026	China League One	8	0	0	0	—		—		8	0
Career total			244	24	7	0	6	0	7	0	264	24

== Honours ==
Individual

- Birmingham City Young Player of the Season: 2015–16
