= 2016–17 Bolton Wanderers F.C. season =

Bolton Wanderers
2016–17 season
- Chairman: Ken Anderson
- Manager: Phil Parkinson
- Stadium: Macron Stadium
- League One: 2nd (promoted)
- FA Cup: Third round
- League Cup: First round
- League Trophy: Group stage
- Top goalscorer: League: 4 players (9); All: Josh Vela, Gary Madine (10)
- Highest home attendance: 23,376 v Chesterfield; 01 April 2017
- Lowest home attendance: 1,540 v Everton U-23s; 30 August 2016
- Average home league attendance: 15194
Home colours	Away colours	Third colours

The 2016–17 season was Bolton Wanderers's first season in the third tier of English football since 1993 following their relegation from the Football League Championship. Along with Football League One, the club competed in the FA Cup, Football League Cup and Football League Trophy. The season covered the period from 1 July 2016 to 30 June 2017.

== Pre-season ==
On 20 May 2016, Bolton Wanderers announced their English pre-season schedule in full for both the entire squad and an XI squad. They also announced that there would be a training camp and further games abroad. These games were confirmed on 3 June as being against Danish teams HB Køge and FC Helsingør. On 17 June the away game at Ashton United was cancelled as the home side's pitch would not be ready. On 27 June the game at HB Køge was cancelled as it was felt that the date was too early in the pre-season. The Bolton XI game against Chester on 20 July was also cancelled as it was felt there was not enough first-team players to make up Bolton's team travelling to Tranmere Rovers a day earlier. Due to this, some of the Bolton XI traveled with the first-team for the game and both games were mixtures of first team players and the reserve players.

9 July 2016 Friendly	FC Helsingør	1–2	Bolton Wanderers	Helsingør
18:00 BST	Riel 24' (pen.)	Report	Madine 5'; Proctor 90'	Stadium: Helsingør Stadion; Attendance: 357

16 July 2016 Friendly	Mansfield Town	2–1	Bolton Wanderers	Mansfield
15:00 BST	Rose 11'; Pearce 23'	Report	Clough 53'	Stadium: Field Mill; Attendance: 1,481

19 July 2016 Friendly	Tranmere Rovers	1–2	Bolton Wanderers	Prenton
19:45 BST	Jennings 5'	Report	Dervite 71'; Clough 90'	Stadium: Prenton Park

23 July 2016 Friendly	York City	0–2	Bolton Wanderers	York
19:30 BST		Report	Davies 5'; Proctor 83' (pen.)	Stadium: Bootham Crescent

26 July 2016 Friendly	Bolton Wanderers	1–2	Burnley	Bolton
20:00 BST	Spearing 49'	Report	Gray 15' (pen.); Ginnelly 90'	Stadium: Macron Stadium; Attendance: 3,766

30 July 2016 Friendly	Bolton Wanderers	0–0	Preston North End	Bolton
15:00 BST				Stadium: Macron Stadium; Attendance: 3,669

== Competitions ==
=== League One ===
==== League table ====
Pos	Team	Pld	W	D	L	GF	GA	GD	Pts	Promotion, qualification or relegation
1	Sheffield United (C, P)	46	30	10	6	92	47	+45	100	Promotion to the EFL Championship
2	Bolton Wanderers (P)	46	25	11	10	68	36	+32	86	Promotion to the EFL Championship
3	Scunthorpe United	46	24	10	12	80	54	+26	82	Qualification for the League One play-offs (Note: Four teams play for one spot and promotion to the EFL Championship.)
4	Fleetwood Town	46	23	13	10	64	43	+21	82	Qualification for the League One play-offs
5	Bradford City	46	20	19	7	62	43	+19	79	Qualification for the League One play-offs

Source: BBC Sport
Rules for classification: 1) Points; 2) Goal difference; 3) Number of goals scored
(C) Champions; (P) Promoted
Notes:

Matchday	1	2	3	4	5	6	7	8	9	10	11	12	13	14	15	16	17	18	19	20	21	22	23	24	25	26	27	28	29	30	31	32	33	34	35	36	37	38	39	40	41	42	43	44	45	46
Ground	H	A	A	H	A	H	H	A	H	A	H	A	H	A	A	H	A	H	H	A	H	A	H	H	A	H	H	A	H	H	A	A	H	H	A	A	H	A	A	H	A	A	A	H	A	H
Result	W	W	W	W	D	D	D	L	D	L	L	W	W	W	W	W	L	W	W	W	W	L	W	W	D	L	L	D	W	W	D	L	D	D	W	W	W	W	W	D	W	L	L	D	W	W
Position	7	2	1	1	1	1	1	2	3	7	8	4	3	3	2	2	4	3	3	2	2	3	3	2	2	3	3	3	3	3	3	4	4	4	3	3	2	2	2	2	2	2	2	2	2	2

Updated to match(es) played on 30 April 2017. Source: 11v11 for league tables and fixtures
A = Away; H = Home; W = Win; D = Draw; L = Loss

==== Matches ====
On 22 June 2016, the fixtures for the forthcoming season were announced. Bolton will start the season at home to Sheffield United on 6 August and finish at home to Peterborough United on April 30, 2017.

6 August 2016 1	Bolton Wanderers	1–0	Sheffield United	Bolton
15:00 BST	Spearing 37'	Report		Stadium: Macron Stadium; Attendance: 17,050; Referee: Ross Joyce

13 August 2016 2	AFC Wimbledon	1–2	Bolton Wanderers	Kingston upon Thames
15:00 BST	Barcham 16'	Report	Madine 34'; Trotter 70'	Stadium: Kingsmeadow; Attendance: 4,619; Referee: Gavin Ward

17 August 2016 3	Bristol Rovers	1–2	Bolton Wanderers	Bristol
19:45 BST	Harrison 57'	Report	Vela 6'; Spearing 26'	Stadium: Memorial Stadium; Attendance: 9,169; Referee: Ollie Yates

20 August 2016 4	Bolton Wanderers	2–1	Fleetwood Town	Bolton
15:00 BST	Madine 51'; Vela 84'	Report	Ball 34'	Stadium: Macron Stadium; Attendance: 13,524; Referee: Darren England

27 August 2016 5	Charlton Athletic	1–1	Bolton Wanderers	London
15:00 BST	Lookman 90'	Report	53' Madine	Stadium: The Valley; Attendance: 10,926; Referee: Dean Whitestone

3 September 2016 6	Bolton Wanderers	1–1	Southend United	Bolton
15:00 BST	Anderson 48'	Report	Kyprianou 3'	Stadium: Macron Stadium; Attendance: 13,519; Referee: Seb Stockbridge

10 September 2016 7	Bolton Wanderers	1–1	Milton Keynes Dons	Bolton
15:00 BST	Beevers 3'	Report	Colclough 54'	Stadium: Macron Stadium; Attendance: 12,727; Referee: Peter Bankes

17 September 2016 8	Walsall	1–0	Bolton Wanderers	Walsall
15:00 BST	Edwards (red card) 16'; McCarthy 25'; Etheridge (yellow card) 76'	Report	Taylor (yellow card) 60'; Anderson (yellow card) 65' (yellow-red card) 90+4'; Beevers (yellow card) 86'; Moxey (yellow card) 89'	Stadium: The Banks's Stadium; Attendance: 5,962; Referee: Trevor Kettle

24 September 2016 9	Bolton Wanderers	0–0	Bradford City	Bolton
15:00 BST	Spearing (yellow card) 24'; Vela (yellow card) 37'; Proctor (yellow card) 60'; Henry (yellow card) 72'	Report	Marshall (yellow card) 85'	Stadium: Macron Stadium; Attendance: 17,486; Referee: Mark Heywood

27 September 2016 10	Rochdale	1–0	Bolton Wanderers	Rochdale
19:45 BST	Lund (yellow card) 32'; Davies 52'	Report	Taylor (yellow card) 61'	Stadium: Spotland Stadium; Attendance: 6,011; Referee: David Coote

1 October 2016 11	Bolton Wanderers	0–2	Oxford United	Bolton
15:00 BST	Beevers (yellow card) 35'; Trotter (yellow card) 59'; Vela (yellow card) 79'	Report	Lundstram (yellow card) 56'; Thomas 81'; Maguire 90'	Stadium: Macron Stadium; Attendance: 14,207; Referee: Mark Haywood

8 October 2016 12	Swindon Town	0–1	Bolton Wanderers	Swindon
13:00 BST	Delfouneso (yellow card) 43'; Goddard (yellow card) 70'; Raphael Branco (red card) 90+2'	Report	Madine (yellow card) 21'; Wheater (yellow card) 79'; Ormonde-Ottewill 86' (o.g.); Beevers (yellow card) 90+4'; Vela (yellow card) 90+4'	Stadium: County Ground; Attendance: 7,023; Referee: Neil Swarbrick

15 October 2016 13	Bolton Wanderers	2–0	Oldham Athletic	Bolton
15:00 BST	Clough 10', 77'	Report	Burgess (yellow card) 82'	Stadium: Macron Stadium; Attendance: 14,891; Referee: Carl Boyeson

18 October 2016 14	Millwall	0–2	Bolton Wanderers	Bermondsey, London
19:45 BST		Report	Ameobi 3'; Wheater 86'	Stadium: The Den; Attendance: 7,818; Referee: Darren Deadman

24 October 2016 15	Bury	0–2	Bolton Wanderers	Bury
19:45 BST	Soares (yellow card) 54'	Report	Clough 13' (pen.), 56' (pen.)	Stadium: Gigg Lane; Attendance: 8,007; Referee: Geoff Eltringham

29 October 2016 16	Bolton Wanderers	3–1	Port Vale	Bolton
15:00 BST	Clough 7'; Vela 11' (yellow card) 19'; Wilson 16'; Sammy Ameobi (yellow card) 77'	Report	Taylor (yellow card) 18'; Cicilia (yellow card) 31'; Hart 75'	Stadium: Macron Stadium; Attendance: 13,937; Referee: Nigel Miller

13 November 2016 17	Peterborough United	1–0	Bolton Wanderers	Peterborough
12:15 GMT	Coulthirst (yellow card) 10'; Smith 27'	Report	Trotter (yellow card) 28'	Stadium: ABAX Stadium; Attendance: 4,780; Referee: Mark Heywood

19 November 2016 18	Bolton Wanderers	2–0	Millwall	Bolton
15:00 GMT	Trotter (yellow card) 7'; Vela 17'; Thorpe 57'	Report	Williams (yellow card) 34'	Stadium: Macron Stadium; Attendance: 13,110; Referee: Paul Tierney

22 November 2016 19	Bolton Wanderers	1–0	Coventry City	Bolton
20:00 GMT	Clough 11'; Beevers (yellow card) 56'	Report	Sterry (yellow card) 60'; Sordell (yellow card) 67'	Stadium: Macron Stadium; Attendance: 12,290; Referee: Seb Stockbridge

26 November 2016 20	Northampton Town	0–1	Bolton Wanderers	Northampton
15:00 GMT	O'Toole (yellow card) 71'	Report	Clough 25'	Stadium: Sixfields Stadium; Attendance: 7,018; Referee: Darren Deadman

12 December 2016 21	Bolton Wanderers	4–0	Gillingham	Bolton
20:00 GMT	Madine 15', 65'; Vela 28'; Ameobi 80'	Report	Wright (yellow card) 64'	Stadium: Macron Stadium; Attendance: 13,861; Referee: Scott Duncan

17 December 2016 22	Chesterfield	1–0	Bolton Wanderers	Chesterfield
15:00 GMT	O'Neil 26'; Evans (yellow card) 90+3'	Report	Taylor (yellow card) 40'; Wheater (yellow card) 84'; Vela (yellow card) 88'	Stadium: Proact Stadium; Attendance: 6,924; Referee: Mark Haywood

26 December 2016 23	Bolton Wanderers	2–1	Shrewsbury Town	Bolton
15:00 GMT	Wheater 24', 28'	Report	Brown 84'; Ogogo (yellow card) 89'	Stadium: Macron Stadium; Attendance: 16,238; Referee: David Webb

31 December 2016 24	Bolton Wanderers	2–1	Scunthorpe United	Bolton
15:00 GMT	Vela 17'; Spearing (yellow card) 61'; Beevers (yellow card) 69'; Taylor (yellow card) 78'; Henry 90+4'	Report	Dawson (yellow card) 45'; Bishop 62'; Clarke (yellow card) 80'; Mantom (yellow card) 90' van Veen (yellow card) 90+7'	Stadium: Macron Stadium; Attendance: 17,062; Referee: Andy Madley

2 January 2017 25	Coventry City	2–2	Bolton Wanderers	Coventry
15:00 GMT	Tudgay 37'; Haynes (yellow card) 66'; Beavon 69'	Report	Clough 67' (pen.); Clayton 90+1'	Stadium: Ricoh Arena; Attendance: 8,397; Referee: Carl Boyeson

14 January 2017 26	Bolton Wanderers	1–2	Swindon Town	Bolton
15:00 GMT	Wheater 48' (yellow card) 72'; Beevers (yellow card) 79'	Report	Branco (yellow card) 37'; Kasim (yellow card) 47' (goal) 89'; Gladwin 65'	Stadium: Macron Stadium; Attendance: 13,955; Referee: Mark Heywood

28 January 2017 27	Bolton Wanderers	1–2	Charlton Athletic	Bolton
15:00 GMT	Clough 13'; Beevers (yellow card) 35'; Vela (yellow card) 85'	Report	Page (red card) 11'; Bauer 23'; Forster-Caskey (yellow card) 43'; Byrne 45+2'; Watt (yellow card) 52'	Stadium: Macron Stadium; Attendance: https://www.bbc.co.uk/sport/football/38700845 Referee: Robert Jones

4 February 2017 28	Milton Keynes Dons	1–1	Bolton Wanderers	Milton Keynes
15:00 GMT	Aneke (yellow card) 39'; Agard 59'; O'Keefe (yellow card) 82'	Report	Wilson (yellow card) 15'; Beevers (yellow card) 34'; Spearing 45+3'; Moxey (yellow card) 85'	Stadium: stadium:mk Attendance: David Coote; Referee: 21,545

11 February 2017 29	Bolton Wanderers	4–1	Walsall	Bolton
15:00 BST	Madine 15'; O'Connor 26' (o.g.); Trotter 30'; Taylor (yellow card) 57'; Spearing (yellow card) 83'; Long 87'	Report	Oztumer 4'; Chambers (yellow card) 79'; Cuvelier (yellow card) 81'	Stadium: Macron Stadium; Attendance: 13,610; Referee: Darren Drysdale

14 February 2017 30	Bolton Wanderers	1-0	Rochdale	Bolton
20:00 BST	Beevers 82'; Spearing (yellow card) 85'	Report	Kitching (yellow card) 49'; Keane (yellow card) 58'; Vincenti (yellow card) 90'	Stadium: Macron Stadium; Attendance: 13,313; Referee: Chris Kavanagh

18 February 2017 31	Bradford City	2–2	Bolton Wanderers	Bradford
15:00 GMT	Wyke 10', 16'; Cullen (yellow card) 65'		Vela (yellow card) 44'; Wheater 62'; Madine 74'; Wilkinson (yellow card) 88'; Thorpe (yellow card) 90'	Stadium: Valley Parade; Attendance: 21, 190; Referee: Eddie Ilderton

25 February 2017 32	Sheffield United	2–0	Bolton Wanderers	Sheffield
15:00 GMT	Sharp 12', 70' (pen.); Fleck (yellow card) 33'	Report	Wilkinson (yellow card) 51'; Wheater (yellow card) 69'; Osede (yellow card) 79'	Stadium: Bramall Lane; Attendance: 27,165; Referee: Mike Dean

28 February 2017 33	Bolton Wanderers	1–1	Bristol Rovers	Bolton
20:00 GMT	Vela 7' (yellow card) 45+2'; Long (yellow card) 65' (yellow-red card) 90'; Osede (yellow card) 79'	Report	Bodin 75'; Clarke (yellow card) 90+4'	Stadium: Macron Stadium; Attendance: 13,383; Referee: Jeremy Simpson

4 March 2017 34	Bolton Wanderers	1–1	AFC Wimbledon	Bolton
15:00 GMT	Madine 15'	Report	Elliott 39'; Soares (yellow card) 66'	Stadium: Macron Stadium; Attendance: 13,599; Referee: Dean Whitestone

11 March 2017 35	Fleetwood Town	2–4	Bolton Wanderers	Fleetwood
15:00 GMT	Dempsey 22'; Grant 87'	Report	Le Fondre 17', 78'; Wheater 20' (yellow card) 75'; Beevers 48'	Stadium: Highbury Stadium; Attendance: 5,123; Referee: Paul Tierney

14 March 2017 36	Gillingham	0–4	Bolton Wanderers	Gillingham
19:45 GMT	Muldoon (yellow card) 64'; Byrne (yellow card) 78'	Report	Wheater 3'; Le Fondre 15'; Beevers 45+1'; Vela 49'; Madine (yellow card) 74'	Stadium: Priestfield Stadium; Attendance: 5,199; Referee: Tim Robinson

18 March 2017 37	Bolton Wanderers	2–1	Northampton Town	Bolton
15:00 GMT	Le Fondre 75' (pen.); Morais 82'	Report	Richards (yellow card) 17'; Buchanan (yellow card) 51'; Smith 57'	Stadium: Macron Stadium; Attendance: 14,255; Referee: Richard Clark

21 March 2017 38	Oxford United	2–4	Bolton Wanderers	Oxford
19:45 GMT	Hemmings 42'; Maguire 75'; McAleny (yellow card) 77'	Report	Morais 4'; Beevers 23' (yellow card) 89'; Dunkley 60' (o.g.); Vela 90+4'	Stadium: Kassam Stadium; Attendance: 7,146; Referee: Ross Joyce

25 March 2017 39	Shrewsbury	0–2	Bolton Wanderers	Shrewsbury
19:45 GMT	El-Abd (yellow card) 32'; Deegan (yellow card) 45'; Nsiala (yellow card) 56'	Report	Beevers 51'; Le Fondre 66'	Stadium: Greenhous Meadow; Attendance: 7,532; Referee: Seb Stockbridge

1 April 2017 40	Bolton Wanderers	0–0	Chesterfield	Bolton
15:00 GMT		Report	Dimaio (yellow card) 37'; McGinn (yellow card) 50'; Nolan (yellow card) 76' (yellow-red card) 90+5'	Stadium: Macron Stadium; Attendance: 23,376; Referee: Eddie Ilderton

4 April 2017 41	Southend United	0–1	Bolton Wanderers	Southend-on-Sea
19:45 GMT	Ranger (yellow card) 45+6'	Report	Spearing (yellow card) 41'; Pratley (yellow card) 63'; Beevers 90+1'	Stadium: Roots Hall; Attendance: 9,340; Referee: Charles Breakspear

8 April 2017 42	Scunthorpe United	1–0	Bolton Wanderers	Scunthorpe
15:00 BST	Mirfin 11'; Crooks (yellow card) 33'; Bishop (yellow card) 64'; Wallace (yellow card) 80'	Report	Vela (yellow card) 33'	Stadium: Glanford Park; Attendance: 6,149; Referee: David Webb

15 April 2017 43	Oldham Athletic	1–0	Bolton Wanderers	Oldham
12:30 BST	Ngoo (yellow card) 54' (yellow-red card) 64'; Erwin 76'	Report	Dervite (yellow card) 50'	Stadium: Boundary Park; Attendance: 8,788; Referee: Peter Bankes

18 April 2017 44	Bolton Wanderers	0–0	Bury	Bolton
19:45 BST	Spearing (yellow card) 30'; Vela (yellow card) 62'	Report	Barnett (yellow card) 9'	Stadium: Macron Stadium; Attendance: 18,223; Referee: Simon Hooper

22 April 2017 45	Port Vale	0–2	Bolton Wanderers	Burslem
15:00 BST	Cicilia (yellow card) 25' (yellow-red card) 33'; Bikey (yellow card) 66'	Report	Madine (yellow card) 46' (goal) 90'; Spearing (yellow card) 50'; Wheater 66'	Stadium: Vale Park; Attendance: 8,890; Referee: Carl Boyeson

30 April 2017 46	Bolton Wanderers	3–0	Peterborough United	Bolton
12:00 BST	Karacan 22'; Wheater 53'; Le Fondre 75'	Report		Stadium: Macron Stadium; Attendance: 22,590; Referee: Scott Duncan

=== FA Cup ===
Bolton entered the competition at the first round stage for the first time since 1993, alongside all other Football League One and Football League Two sides.

5 November 2016 First round	Bolton Wanderers	1–0	Grimsby Town	Bolton
15:00 GMT	Trotter 20'; Proctor (yellow card) 55'; Taylor (yellow card) 83'	Report	Andrew (yellow card) 22'; Gowling (yellow card) 80'; Bogle (yellow card) 81'	Stadium: Macron Stadium; Attendance: 6,649; Referee: Trevor Kettle

4 December 2016 Second round	Bolton Wanderers	3–2	Sheffield United	Bolton
14:00 GMT	Madine 44'; Sammy Ameobi 46'; Vela 84'	Report	Clarke (yellow card) 57'; Lavery (yellow card) 58'; Coutts 64'; O'Connell 86'	Stadium: Macron Stadium; Attendance: 7,027; Referee: Lee Probert

7 January 2017 Third round	Bolton Wanderers	0–0	Crystal Palace	Bolton
15:00 GMT	Beevers (yellow card) 52'; Spearing (yellow card) 60'	Report		Stadium: Macron Stadium; Attendance: 11,683; Referee: Roger East

17 January 2017 Third round replay	Crystal Palace	2–1	Bolton Wanderers	Selhurst, London
20:00 GMT	Ledley (yellow card) 31'; Benteke 68', 77'	Report	Thorpe (yellow card) 37'; Henry 48'; Wilson (yellow card) 54'	Stadium: Selhurst Park; Attendance: 7,149; Referee: Stuart Attwell

=== League Cup ===
Bolton entered the competition at the first round stage and were drawn to play away at Blackpool in the first round.

9 August 2016 First round	Blackpool	4–2 (a.e.t.)	Bolton Wanderers	Blackpool
19:45 BST	Mellor 74'; Potts 78'; McAlister 109'; Herron 115'	Report	45+2' Proctor; 90+5' Woolery	Stadium: Bloomfield Road; Attendance: 3,633; Referee: Darren Bond

=== EFL Trophy ===
Bolton entered the competition at the first round group stage and were drawn against Everton U-23, Blackpool and Cheltenham Town in Northern Group A.

Pos	Div	Team	Pld	W	PW	PL	L	GF	GA	GD	Pts	Qualification
1	L2	Cheltenham Town	3	2	0	0	1	4	3	+1	6	Advance to Round 2
2	L2	Blackpool	3	1	1	0	1	3	3	0	5	Advance to Round 2
3	ACA	Everton U21	3	1	0	1	1	4	3	+1	4	
4	L1	Bolton Wanderers	3	1	0	0	2	1	3	−2	3	

Source: Sky Sports

30 August 2016 Group stage game 1	Bolton Wanderers	0–2	Everton U-23	Bolton
19:00 BST		Report	Dyson 22'; McAleny 79'	Stadium: Macron Stadium; Attendance: 1540; Referee: David Webb

4 October 2016 Group stage game 2	Bolton Wanderers	1–0	Blackpool	Bolton
19:00 BST	Sammy Ameobi 4'; Vela (yellow card) 63'	Report		Stadium: Macron Stadium; Attendance: 1,589

8 November 2016 Group stage game 3	Cheltenham Town	1–0	Bolton Wanderers	Cheltenham
19:45 GMT	Pell (yellow card) 65'; Morgan-Smith 90+1' (pen.)	Report	Alnwick (yellow card) 90+1'	Stadium: LCI Rail Stadium; Attendance: 1,038; Referee: Kevin Friend

== Squad ==
No.	Name	Pos.	Nationality	Place of birth	Age	Apps	Goals	Signed from	Date signed	Fee	End
Goalkeepers
13	Ben Alnwick	GK	(England)	Prudhoe	30	26	0	Peterborough United	31 August 2016	Free	2018
33	Mark Howard	GK	(England)	Southwark	30	29	0	Sheffield United	13 July 2016	Free	2018
Defenders
2	Lewis Buxton	RB	(England)	Newport	33	11	0	Rotherham United	5 August 2016	Free	2017
3	Dean Moxey	LB	(England)	Exeter	31	82	2	Crystal Palace	2 July 2014	Free	2017
4	Dorian Dervite	CB	(France)	Lille	28	83	1	Charlton Athletic	27 May 2014	Free	2017
5	Mark Beevers	CB	(England)	Barnsley	27	51	7	Millwall	3 July 2016	Free	2018
15	Derik Osede	CB	(Spain)	Madrid	24	51	0	Real Madrid	6 July 2015	Free	2018
20	Andrew Taylor	LB	(England)	Hartlepool	30	40	0	Wigan Athletic	10 August 2016	Loan	2017
23	Lawrie Wilson	RB	(England)	Collier Row	29	39	2	Charlton Athletic	5 August 2015	Free	2017
25	Reece Wabara	RB	(England)	Bromsgrove	25	1	0	Free Agent	15 February 2017	Free	2017
31	David Wheater	CB	(England)	Redcar	30	167	15	Middlesbrough	20 January 2011	Undisclosed	2017
Midfielders
6	Josh Vela	CM	(England)	Salford	23	132	12	Academy	20 March 2011	Trainee	2019
8	Jay Spearing	DM	(England)	Wallasey	28	173	10	Liverpool	9 August 2013	Undisclosed	2017
10	Jem Karacan	CM	(Turkey)	Catford	28	5	1	Free Agent	11 March 2017	Free	2017
11	Viv Solomon-Otabor	LW	(England)	London	21	4	0	Birmingham City	31 January 2017	Loan	2017
16	Mark Davies	CM	(England)	Willenhall	29	208	16	Wolverhampton Wanderers	26 January 2009	Undisclosed	2017
17	Liam Trotter	CM	(England)	Ipswich	28	74	6	Millwall	1 July 2014	Free	2017
21	Darren Pratley	CM	(England)	Barking	32	168	15	Swansea City	1 July 2011	Free	2018
22	Filipe Morais	RW	(Portugal)	Benavente	31	19	2	Bradford City	2 February 2017	Free	2017
24	James Henry	RW	(England)	Reading	27	35	2	Wolverhampton Wanderers	31 August 2016	Loan	2017
32	Tom Thorpe	CM	(England)	Manchester	24	25	1	Rotherham United	31 August 2016	Loan	2017
Forwards
12	Chris Long	CF	(England)	Huyton	22	10	1	Burnley	31 January 2017	Loan	2017
14	Gary Madine	CF	(England)	Gateshead	26	78	16	Sheffield Wednesday	8 June 2015	Free	2017
19	Max Clayton	CF	(England)	Crewe	22	30	2	Crewe Alexandra	18 September 2014	£300,000	2017
35	Conor Wilkinson	CF	(Republic of Ireland)	Croydon	22	16	0	Millwall	2 July 2013	Undisclosed	2018
45	Adam Le Fondre	CF	(England)	Stockport	30	36	14	Cardiff City	31 January 2017	Loan	2017
Out on Loan
1	Ben Amos	GK	(England)	Macclesfield	27	45	0	Manchester United	1 July 2015	Free	2019
7	Chris Taylor	LM	(England)	Oldham	30	23	0	Blackburn Rovers	2 July 2016	Free	2018
9	Jamie Proctor	CF	(England)	Preston	25	29	1	Bradford City	1 July 2016	Free	2018
28	Tom Walker	MF	(England)	Salford	21	21	1	Academy	1 July 2014	Trainee	2017

=== Statistics ===
As of 1 May 2017

No.	Pos	Nat	Player	Total		League One		FA Cup		EFL Cup		EFL Trophy	
No.	Pos	Nat	Player	Apps	Goals	Apps	Goals	Apps	Goals	Apps	Goals	Apps	Goals
2	DF	(England) ENG	Lewis Buxton	11	0	9+0	0	0+0	0	0+0	0	2+0	0
3	DF	(England) ENG	Dean Moxey	22	0	16+3	0	0+1	0	1+0	0	1+0	0
4	DF	(France) FRA	Dorian Dervite	14	0	13+1	0	0+0	0	0+0	0	0+0	0
5	DF	(England) ENG	Mark Beevers	51	7	45+0	7	4+0	0	1+0	0	1+0	0
6	MF	(England) ENG	Josh Vela	53	10	45+1	9	3+0	1	0+1	0	3+0	0
8	MF	(England) ENG	Jay Spearing	42	3	36+1	3	3+0	0	0+0	0	0+2	0
10	MF	(Turkey) TUR	Jem Karacan	5	1	2+3	1	0+0	0	0+0	0	0+0	0
11	MF	(England) ENG	Viv Solomon-Otabor	4	0	0+4	0	0+0	0	0+0	0	0+0	0
12	FW	(England) ENG	Chris Long	10	1	3+7	1	0+0	0	0+0	0	0+0	0
13	GK	(England) ENG	Ben Alnwick	26	0	20+1	0	3+0	0	0+0	0	2+0	0
14	FW	(England) ENG	Gary Madine	42	10	36+0	9	3+0	1	0+1	0	0+2	0
15	DF	(Spain) ESP	Derik	28	0	19+6	0	0+1	0	1+0	0	1+0	0
16	MF	(England) ENG	Mark Davies	6	0	4+1	0	0+0	0	1+0	0	0+0	0
17	MF	(England) ENG	Liam Trotter	23	3	17+3	2	1+0	1	1+0	0	1+0	0
19	FW	(England) ENG	Max Clayton	13	1	0+10	1	0+2	0	0+0	0	0+1	0
20	DF	(England) ENG	Andrew Taylor	40	0	31+3	0	4+0	0	0+0	0	2+0	0
21	MF	(England) ENG	Darren Pratley	12	0	11+1	0	0+0	0	0+0	0	0+0	0
22	MF	(Portugal) POR	Filipe Morais	19	2	19+0	2	0+0	0	0+0	0	0+0	0
23	DF	(England) ENG	Lawrie Wilson	26	1	18+0	1	4+0	0	1+0	0	3+0	0
24	MF	(England) ENG	James Henry	35	2	12+18	1	2+1	1	0+0	0	2+0	0
25	DF	(England) ENG	Reece Wabara	1	0	1+0	0	0+0	0	0+0	0	0+0	0
31	DF	(England) ENG	David Wheater	49	9	43+0	9	4+0	0	0+0	0	2+0	0
32	MF	(England) ENG	Tom Thorpe	25	1	16+5	1	3+0	0	0+0	0	1+0	0
33	GK	(England) ENG	Mark Howard	29	0	26+1	0	1+0	0	0+0	0	1+0	0
35	FW	(England) ENG	Conor Wilkinson	9	0	2+6	0	0+0	0	0+0	0	0+1	0
37	MF	(England) ENG	Alex Perry	2	0	0+0	0	1+0	0	0+0	0	1+0	0
38	MF	(England) ENG	Jack Earing	1	0	0+0	0	0+0	0	0+0	0	1+0	0
43	FW	(Iran) IRI	Alex Samizadeh	1	0	0+0	0	0+0	0	0+0	0	0+1	0
45	FW	(England) ENG	Adam Le Fondre	19	6	17+2	6	0+0	0	0+0	0	0+0	0
Out on Loan:
1	GK	(England) ENG	Ben Amos	1	0	0+0	0	0+0	0	1+0	0	0+0	0
7	MF	(England) ENG	Chris Taylor	23	0	3+13	0	1+3	0	1+0	0	2+0	0
9	FW	(England) ENG	Jamie Proctor	29	1	7+14	0	1+3	0	1+0	1	3+0	0
28	MF	(England) ENG	Tom Walker	1	0	0+0	0	0+0	0	1+0	0	0+0	0
Player who left the club during the course of the season:
10	FW	(England) ENG	Zach Clough	29	9	17+6	9	4+0	0	0+0	0	1+1	0
11	FW	(England) ENG	Keshi Anderson	10	1	3+5	1	0+1	0	0+0	0	1+0	0
22	MF	(England) ENG	Sammy Ameobi	24	4	15+5	2	2+0	1	0+0	0	1+1	1
30	FW	(England) ENG	Kaiyne Woolery	3	1	0+1	0	0+0	0	0+1	1	1+0	0
36	DF	(England) ENG	Alex Finney	1	0	0+0	0	0+0	0	1+0	0	0+0	0

=== Goals record ===
As of 1 May 2017

Rank	No.	Nat.	Po.	Name	League One	FA Cup	EFL Cup	EFL Trophy	Total
1	6	(England)	CM	Josh Vela	9	1	0	0	10
1	14	(England)	CF	Gary Madine	9	1	0	0	10
3	~~10~~	(England)	SS	Zach Clough	9	0	0	0	9
3	31	(England)	CB	David Wheater	9	0	0	0	9
5	5	(England)	CB	Mark Beevers	7	0	0	0	7
6	45	(England)	CF	Adam Le Fondre	6	0	0	0	6
7	~~22~~	(England)	RW	Sammy Ameobi	2	1	0	1	4
8	8	(England)	DM	Jay Spearing	3	0	0	0	3
8	17	(England)	CM	Liam Trotter	2	1	0	0	3
10	22	(Portugal)	RW	Filipe Morais	2	0	0	0	2
10	24	(England)	RW	James Henry	1	1	0	0	2
12	9	(England)	CF	Jamie Proctor	0	0	1	0	1
12	10	(Turkey)	CM	Jem Karacan	1	0	0	0	1
12	~~11~~	(England)	CF	Keshi Anderson	1	0	0	0	1
12	12	(England)	SS	Chris Long	1	0	0	0	1
12	19	(England)	LW	Max Clayton	1	0	0	0	1
12	23	(England)	RB	Lawrie Wilson	1	0	0	0	1
12	~~30~~	(England)	CF	Kaiyne Woolery	0	0	1	0	1
12	32	(England)	CM	Tom Thorpe	1	0	0	0	1
Total					66	4	2	1	73

=== Disciplinary record ===
As of 1 May 2017

Rank	No.	Nat.	Po.	Name	League One			FA Cup			EFL Cup			EFL Trophy			Total		
Rank	No.	Nat.	Po.	Name	Yellow card	(yellow card) (yellow-red card)	Red card	Yellow card	(yellow card) (yellow-red card)	Red card	Yellow card	(yellow card) (yellow-red card)	Red card	Yellow card	(yellow card) (yellow-red card)	Red card	Yellow card	(yellow card) (yellow-red card)	Red card
1	8	(England)	DM	Jay Spearing	12	0	0	1	0	0	0	0	0	0	0	0	13	0	0
2	6	(England)	CM	Josh Vela	11	0	0	0	0	0	0	0	0	1	0	0	12	0	0
3	5	(England)	CB	Mark Beevers	9	0	0	1	0	0	0	0	0	0	0	0	10	0	0
4	17	(England)	CM	Liam Trotter	5	0	0	0	0	0	0	0	0	0	0	0	5	0	0
4	31	(England)	CB	David Wheater	5	0	0	0	0	0	0	0	0	0	0	0	5	0	0
6	20	(England)	LB	Andrew Taylor	3	0	0	1	0	0	0	0	0	0	0	0	4	0	0
6	14	(England)	CF	Gary Madine	4	0	0	0	0	0	0	0	0	0	0	0	4	0	0
8	3	(England)	LB	Dean Moxey	3	0	0	0	0	0	0	0	0	0	0	0	3	0	0
8	16	(England)	CM	Mark Davies	2	0	0	0	0	0	1	0	0	0	0	0	3	0	0
8	35	(Republic of Ireland)	CF	Conor Wilkinson	3	0	0	0	0	0	0	0	0	0	0	0	3	0	0
11	4	(France)	CB	Dorian Dervite	2	0	0	0	0	0	0	0	0	0	0	0	2	0	0
11	7	(England)	LM	Chris Taylor	2	0	0	0	0	0	0	0	0	0	0	0	2	0	0
11	9	(England)	CF	Jamie Proctor	1	0	0	1	0	0	0	0	0	0	0	0	2	0	0
11	~~10~~	(England)	SS	Zach Clough	2	0	0	0	0	0	0	0	0	0	0	0	2	0	0
11	15	(Spain)	CB	Derik Osede	2	0	0	0	0	0	0	0	0	0	0	0	2	0	0
11	23	(England)	RB	Lawrie Wilson	1	0	0	1	0	0	0	0	0	0	0	0	2	0	0
11	32	(England)	CM	Tom Thorpe	1	0	0	1	0	0	0	0	0	0	0	0	2	0	0
17	2	(England)	RB	Lewis Buxton	1	0	0	0	0	0	0	0	0	0	0	0	1	0	0
17	~~11~~	(England)	CF	Keshi Anderson	0	1	0	0	0	0	0	0	0	0	0	0	0	1	0
17	12	(England)	CF	Chris Long	0	1	0	0	0	0	0	0	0	0	0	0	0	1	0
17	13	(England)	GK	Ben Alnwick	0	0	0	0	0	0	0	0	0	1	0	0	1	0	0
17	21	(England)	CM	Darren Pratley	1	0	0	0	0	0	0	0	0	0	0	0	1	0	0
17	~~22~~	(England)	RW	Sammy Ameobi	1	0	0	0	0	0	0	0	0	0	0	0	1	0	0
17	24	(England)	RW	James Henry	1	0	0	0	0	0	0	0	0	0	0	0	1	0	0
17	~~30~~	(England)	CF	Kaiyne Woolery	0	0	0	0	0	0	1	0	0	0	0	0	1	0	0
Total					72	2	0	6	0	0	2	0	0	2	0	0	82	2	0

== Transfers ==
At the completion of the previous season the club announced that twenty players would not be offered new contracts once their present ones concluded. These players included senior squad members Neil Danns, Stephen Dobbie, Tom Eaves, Liam Feeney, Robert Hall, Emile Heskey, Paul Rachubka, Oscar Threlkeld, David Wheater and Hayden White. These players were followed out of the club by young defender Tyler Garratt who signed for Doncaster Rovers on 28 June for an undisclosed fee.

On 1 July, it was reported that the transfer embargo that the club had been under since the previous season was to be at least partially lifted by the Football League and the day after former Blackburn Rovers midfielder Chris Taylor signed on a free transfer, followed the following day by Millwall defender Mark Beevers, also on a free transfer. They were followed on 5 July by Bradford City forward Jamie Proctor, also signed on a free transfer. Former Sheffield United goalkeeper Mark Howard then signed for the club. David Wheater re-signed on a one-year deal after initially being released at the end of the previous season. He was shortly followed to the club by defender Lewis Buxton after his release from Rotherham United.

=== Transfers in ===
Date from	Position	Nationality	Name	From	Fee	Ref.
2 July 2016	LM	(England)	Chris Taylor	Blackburn Rovers	Free transfer	
3 July 2016	CB	(England)	Mark Beevers	Millwall	Free transfer	
5 July 2016	CF	(England)	Jamie Proctor	Bradford City	Free transfer	
13 July 2016	GK	(England)	Mark Howard	Sheffield United	Free transfer	
5 August 2016	RB	(England)	Lewis Buxton	Rotherham United	Free transfer	
31 August 2016	GK	(England)	Ben Alnwick	Peterborough United	Free transfer	
2 February 2017	RW	(Portugal)	Filipe Morais	Bradford City	Free transfer	
15 February 2017	RB	(England)	Reece Wabara	Wigan Athletic	Free transfer	
11 March 2017	CM	(Turkey)	Jem Karacan	Unattached	Free transfer	

=== Transfers out ===
Date from	Position	Nationality	Name	To	Fee	Ref.
28 June 2016	LB	(England)	Tyler Garratt	Doncaster Rovers	Undisclosed	
1 July 2016	GK	(England)	Harry Campbell	Burton Albion (Note: Following Campbell's release, he signed for Burton Albion.)	Released	
1 July 2016	DM	(England)	Channing Campbell-Young	Free agent	Released	
1 July 2016	CM	(Spain)	Jon Ceberio	Real Sociedad C	Released	
1 July 2016	CM	(Austria)	Chris Cvetko	FC Blau-Weiß Linz	Released	
1 July 2016	CM	(Guyana)	Neil Danns	Bury (Note: Following Danns' release, he signed for Bury.)	Released	
1 July 2016	SS	(Scotland)	Stephen Dobbie	Queen of the South	Released	
1 July 2016	CF	(England)	Tom Eaves	Yeovil Town (Note: Following Eaves' release, he signed for Yeovil Town.)	Released	
1 July 2016	RW	(England)	Liam Feeney	Blackburn Rovers (Note: Following Feeney's release, he signed for Blackburn Rovers.)	Released	
1 July 2016	GK	(England)	Ross Fitzsimons	Braintree Town (Note: Following Fitzsimons release, he signed for Braintree Town.)	Released	
1 July 2016	LW	(England)	Robert Hall	Oxford United (Note: Following Hall's release, he signed for Oxford United.)	Released	
1 July 2016	CF	(England)	Emile Heskey	Free agent	Released	
1 July 2016	CM	(England)	Jordan Lussey	Southport	Released	
1 July 2016	RB	(England)	Niall Maher	Bury (Note: Following Maher's release, he signed for Bury.)	Released	
1 July 2016	GK	(England)	Paul Rachubka	Bury (Note: Following Rachubka's release, he signed for Bury.)	Released	
1 July 2016	CB	(England)	Quade Taylor	Braintree Town	Released	
1 July 2016	CF	(Wales)	Jamie Thomas	Burnley (Note: Following Thomas's release, he signed for Burnley.)	Released	
1 July 2016	DM	(England)	Oscar Threlkeld	Plymouth Argyle (Note: Following Threlkeld's release, he signed for Plymouth Argyle.)	Released	
1 July 2016	LB	(Cameroon)	Yvan Wassi	Free agent	Released	
1 July 2016	RB	(England)	Hayden White	Peterborough United (Note: Following White's release, he signed for Peterborough United.)	Released	
7 July 2016	RB	(Italy)	Francesco Pisano	Olbia Calcio 1905	Released	
22 July 2016	CB	(England)	Rob Holding	Arsenal	£2,500,000	
1 August 2016	DF	(England)	Nathaniel Phillips	Liverpool	Free transfer	
1 August 2016	DM	(Czech Republic)	Filip Twardzik	Free Agent	Released	
8 August 2016	ST	(England)	Daniel McKenna	Witton Albion	Free transfer	
12 August 2016	CB	(England)	Alex Finney	Queens Park Rangers (Note: Following Finney's release, he signed for Queens Park Rangers.)	Released	
31 August 2016	CF	(England)	Kaiyne Woolery	Wigan Athletic	£207,000	
31 January 2017	SS	(England)	Zach Clough	Nottingham Forest	£2,610,000	

=== Loans in ===
Date from	Position	Nationality	Name	From	Until	Ref.
10 August 2016	LB	(England)	Andrew Taylor	Wigan Athletic	End of Season	
31 August 2016	LW	(England)	Sammy Ameobi	Newcastle United	3 January 2017	
31 August 2016	CF	(England)	Keshi Anderson	Crystal Palace	16 January 2017 (Note: On 16 January 2017, Keshi Anderson's season-long loan was terminated.)	
31 August 2016	RW	(England)	James Henry	Wolverhampton Wanderers	End of Season	
31 August 2016	CB	(England)	Tom Thorpe	Rotherham United	End of Season	
30 January 2017	SS	(England)	Chris Long	Burnley	End of Season	
31 January 2017	CF	(England)	Adam Le Fondre	Cardiff City	End of Season	
31 January 2017	LW	(England)	Viv Solomon-Otabor	Birmingham City	End of Season	

=== Loans out ===
Date from	Position	Nationality	Name	To	Until	Ref.
5 August 2016	ST	(England)	George Newell	AFC Fylde	End of Season	
26 August 2016	GK	(England)	Ben Amos	Cardiff City	End of Season	
31 August 2016	CM	(England)	Tom Walker	Bury	End of Season	
31 August 2016	CF	(Republic of Ireland)	Conor Wilkinson	Chesterfield	January 2017	
31 January 2017	CF	(England)	Jamie Proctor	Carlisle United	End of Season	
31 January 2017	LM	(England)	Chris Taylor	Oldham Athletic	End of Season	

== Summary ==
Games played	54 (46 League One, 4 FA Cup, 1 League Cup, 3 EFL Trophy)
Games won	28 (25 League One, 2 FA Cup, 0 League Cup, 1 EFL Trophy)
Games drawn	12 (11 League One, 1 FA Cup, 0 League Cup, 0 EFL Trophy)
Games lost	14 (10 League One, 1 FA Cup, 1 League Cup, 2 EFL Trophy)
Goals scored	75 (68 League One, 4 FA Cup, 2 League Cup, 1 EFL Trophy)
Goals conceded	47 (36 League One, 4 FA Cup, 4 League Cup, 3 EFL Trophy)
Goal difference	+28
Clean sheets	20 (17 League One, 2 FA Cup, 0 League Cup, 1 EFL Trophy)
Yellow cards	82 (72 League One, 6 FA Cup, 2 League Cup, 2 EFL Trophy)
Red cards	2 (2 League One, 0 FA Cup, 0 League Cup, 0 EFL Trophy)
Worst Discipline	Jay Spearing (13 (yellow card) , 0 (yellow card) (yellow-red card) 0 (red card) )
Best result	4–0 vs Gillingham (12 Dec 16), 4–0 vs Gillingham (14 Mar 17)
Worst result	2–4 vs Blackpool (9 Aug 16)
Most appearances	Josh Vela (53)
Top scorer	Josh Vela, Gary Madine (10)
Points	86
