= Tom Thorpe =

English footballer

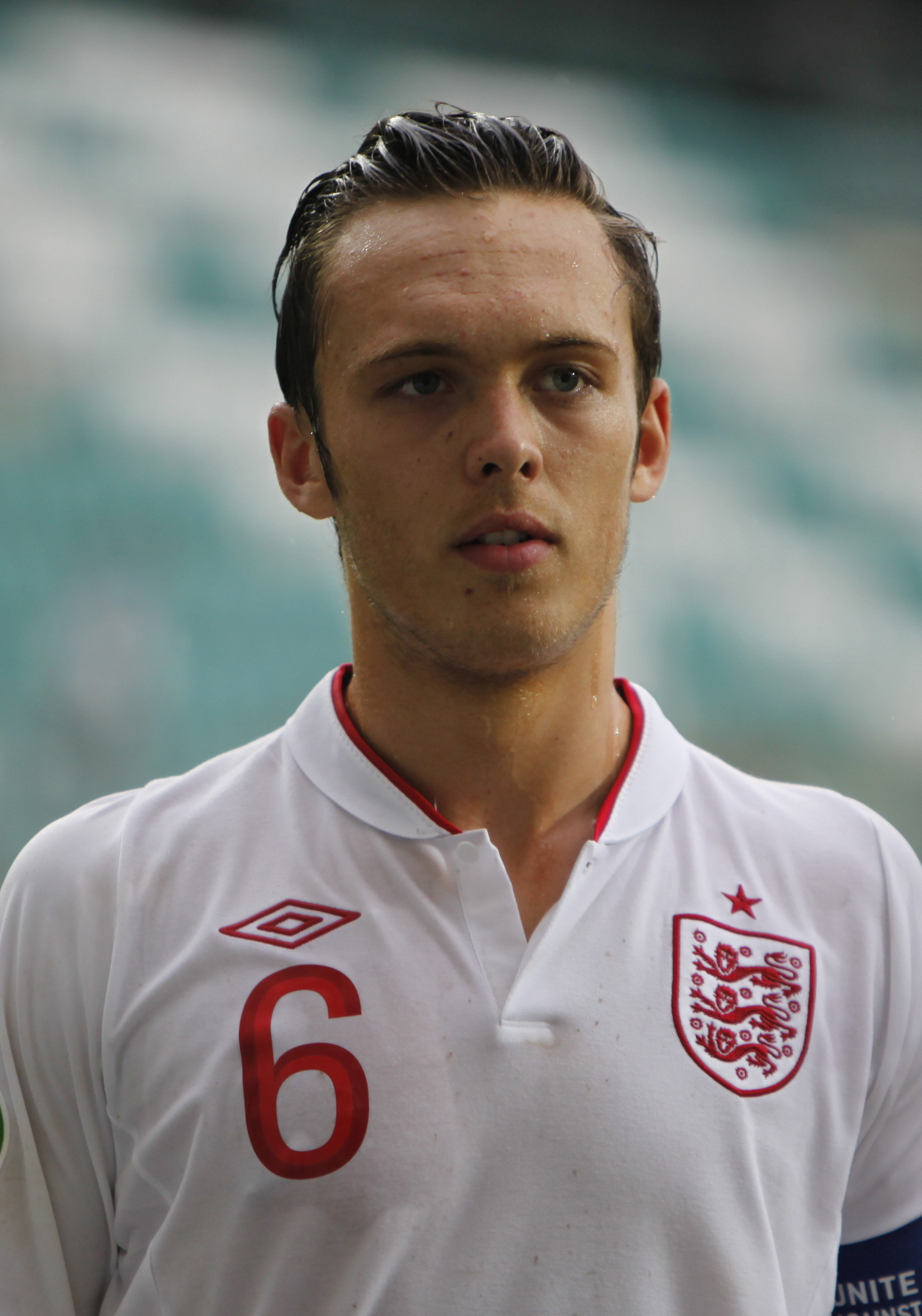
- Thorpe playing for England U19 in 2012

Personal information
- Full name: Thomas Joseph Thorpe
- Date of birth: 13 January 1993 (age 33)
- Place of birth: Manchester, England
- Height: 6 ft 2 in (1.88 m)
- Position: Defender

Youth career
- 2009–2014: Manchester United

Senior career*
Years	Team	Apps	(Gls)
2014–2015	Manchester United	1	(0)
2014	→ Birmingham City (loan)	7	(0)
2015–2017	Rotherham United	12	(2)
2016	→ Bradford City (loan)	3	(0)
2016–2017	→ Bolton Wanderers (loan)	25	(1)
2017–2018	ATK	12	(1)
2023–2024	Macclesfield	10	(0)
2024	Stalybridge Celtic	2	(0)

International career
2008–2009	England U16	6	(0)
2009–2010	England U17	9	(0)
2010	England U18	1	(0)
2011–2012	England U19	9	(1)
2013	England U20	3	(0)
2013	England U21	1	(0)
Medal record
Men's football
Representing England
UEFA European Under-17 Championship
Winner	2010 Liechtenstein
Men's football
	Manchester United
FA Youth Cup
Winner	2011 FA Youth Cup
- * Club domestic league appearances and goals as of 15:47, 19 November 2023 (UTC)

Thomas Joseph Thorpe (born 13 January 1993) is an English professional footballer who plays as a defender.

A product of the youth academy of Manchester United, Thorpe was loaned to Championship club Birmingham City in 2014. He was called into the Manchester United first team in September 2014 and made his Premier League debut shortly after. Released in 2015, he went on to play in the Football League for Rotherham United, Bradford City and Bolton Wanderers, for ATK of the Indian Super League, and in non-league football for Macclesfield and Stalybridge Celtic.

Thorpe represented England at all youth levels from England U16 to England U21, and was a member of the 2010 UEFA European Under-17 Championship-winning team.

== Club career ==
=== Manchester United ===
==== Youth teams ====
Born in Manchester, Thorpe joined Manchester United as a first-year academy scholar in July 2009 at the age of 16, after playing six times for the club's under-18 team during the 2008–09 season. His debut came against Liverpool on 13 December 2008 and he played the whole game as Manchester United won 3–1. He began the 2009–10 season as part of the under-17s team that won the Milk Cup for the second consecutive year, conceding just two goals in their five games in the tournament. He became a regular for the under-18s during the season, playing in 24 of the team's 28 league matches on the way to winning Group C of the Premier Academy League; however, they lost to Arsenal on penalties in the play-off semi-finals. He scored his only goal of the season – his first for the under-18s – in a 4–1 away win over Middlesbrough on 17 April 2010, just four days after getting his first taste of reserve team action; he was named as an unused substitute for a Premier Reserve League game against Liverpool on 13 April.

After signing his first professional contract over the summer, Thorpe was again included in the Manchester United squad for the Milk Cup in 2010, but defeat to the ASPIRE Academy from Qatar in their second game meant they were unable to defend their title; however, they were able to win the second-tier Slemish Trophy competition with victories over County Down, Shamrock Rovers and Hartlepool United. The under-18s began the Premier Academy League season with an eight-game unbeaten run, during which Thorpe scored once against Huddersfield Town, and on 27 September 2010, he made his first appearance for the reserves, coming on as a 76th-minute substitute for Reece Brown in a 2–2 away draw with Blackburn Rovers.

He had a three-game run in the reserves in November 2010, and scored his first goal for the team against Bolton Wanderers on 2 November. Because of his increased involvement with the reserves, Thorpe made only 17 league appearances for the under-18s in 2010–11, but that was made up for by a successful run as captain in the FA Youth Cup; after beating Portsmouth, West Ham United, Newcastle United, Liverpool and Chelsea in the earlier rounds, the team beat Sheffield United 6–3 on aggregate in the two-legged final.

Thorpe made the step up to the reserves on a permanent basis in 2011–12, but injuries kept him from securing a regular place in the team for the first month of the season. Nevertheless, he impressed enough in his two Manchester Senior Cup appearances in September 2011 to earn himself a place on the bench for the first team's League Cup third round match against Leeds United on 20 September; he was given the number 39 jersey for the match, but did not take the field. Thorpe only made 12 league appearances for the reserves during their title-winning season, most of them in an unfamiliar central midfield role, but he was an integral part of the team that went on to win the Manchester Senior Cup, coming on as a substitute in their 2–0 victory over Manchester City in the final. After the summer break, he also played in the final of the 2011–12 Lancashire Senior Cup, and helped Manchester United keep a clean sheet as they beat Accrington Stanley 4–0.

With his injury woes behind him, Thorpe took over as captain of the reserve team (now the under-21s) for the 2012–13 season and was almost ever-present in the league as Manchester United claimed the inaugural Under-21 Premier League title; after finishing second to Tottenham Hotspur in both group phases of the competition, Manchester United got their revenge in the final of the competition, beating Tottenham 3–2 at Old Trafford. Thorpe scored twice during the season, first with a header from an Adnan Januzaj corner away to Newcastle United on 12 November, then a rising shot from 20 yards against Tottenham on 15 February. From the end of February, the team went on a run of 10 games that included eight clean sheets, and Thorpe's performances earned him a nomination for the Denzil Haroun Reserve Team Player of the Year Award; however, he ultimately finished in third behind Januzaj and fellow defender Marnick Vermijl.

==== Birmingham City (loan) ====
Thorpe was ever-present for the under-21s in the first half of the 2013–14 season, and his performances in helping Manchester United to the best defensive record in the league attracted the attention of Birmingham City, who signed him and two fellow United youngsters, defender Tyler Blackett and forward Federico Macheda, on 31 January 2014 on loan until the end of the 2013–14 season. He made his senior debut the following day, starting a Championship match against Derby County, but was stretchered off after only 14 minutes after injuring an ankle. He returned to Manchester United for treatment after suffering ligament damage, and the loan was terminated on 3 March. Thorpe rejoined Birmingham City until the end of the season on 27 March, but returned to Manchester United again with two games of the season remaining to undergo treatment, having suffered a recurrence of an ankle injury in April 2014.

==== First team ====
On 25 September 2014, Manchester United manager Louis van Gaal confirmed in his weekly press conference that youngsters would be drafted in to the first team to help ease the club's injury crisis at the centre-back position. Ahead of a Premier League match against West Ham United at Old Trafford two days later, Thorpe and Paddy McNair were named in the squad, with McNair starting the game and Thorpe on the bench; he came on as a substitute for Ángel Di María in injury time at the end of the game to make his top-flight debut.

=== Rotherham United ===
Thorpe was released by Manchester United at the end of his contract in July 2015. He then joined Rotherham United on a two-year deal on 3 July. He made his debut for the club on 8 August 2015, the opening day of the 2015–16 Football League Championship season, playing at centre-back in a 4–1 home defeat to Milton Keynes Dons; after Rotherham went 3–1 down in the first half, Thorpe missed a header in the second half that would have made the score 3–2. After being named as an unused substitute for the League Cup win over Cambridge United three days later, Thorpe returned to the side for the 2–1 league defeat away to Nottingham Forest on 15 August, coming on as a substitute for Smallwood in the 81st minute. He left the club at the end of the 2016–17 season.

=== Bradford City (loan) ===
On 21 March 2016, Thorpe joined League One club Bradford City on an emergency loan deal until 8 May 2016. He started his first match five days later, playing the full 90 minutes in midfield against Millwall. He made four appearances during the loan spell.

=== Bolton Wanderers (loan) ===
On 31 August 2016, he joined Bolton Wanderers on a season-long loan, linking up again with Phil Parkinson who had signed him the previous season for Bradford City. He made his Wanderers debut as a late substitute for Josh Vela in the 1–1 draw with Milton Keynes Dons at the Macron Stadium on 10 September. Thorpe scored his first goal for Bolton against Millwall on 19 November, and finished the season with 25 appearances in all competitions as Bolton were promoted as League One runners-up.

=== ATK ===
On 11 September 2017, Thorpe became the seventh foreign signing for Indian Super League franchise ATK, managed by former England international Teddy Sheringham.

=== Macclesfield and Stalybridge Celtic ===
On 14 February 2023, after five years without a team, Thorpe signed for Northern Premier League (NPL) Division One West team Macclesfield. He took such a long break from football because of mental health problems. He was released by the club on 19 September 2023, and joined Stalybridge Celtic of the NPL Division One West on 27 October.

== International career ==
Thorpe has represented England at all levels from under-16 to under-21. He was a member of the under-17 squad that won the 2010 UEFA European Under-17 Championship. He was named as England under-19 captain at the 2012 UEFA European Under-19 Championship. He was also included in the England squad for the 2013 FIFA U-20 World Cup. Thorpe made his first and only under-21 appearance against Scotland in 2013.

== Career statistics ==
As of match played 18 November 2023

Appearances and goals by club, season and competition
Club	Season	League			National Cup		League Cup		Other		Total	
Club	Season	Division	Apps	Goals	Apps	Goals	Apps	Goals	Apps	Goals	Apps	Goals
Manchester United	2013–14	Premier League	0	0	0	0	0	0	0	0	0	0
Manchester United	2014–15	Premier League	1	0	0	0	0	0	—		1	0
Manchester United	Total		1	0	0	0	0	0	0	0	0	0
Birmingham City (loan)	2013–14	Championship	6	0	—		—		—		6	0
Rotherham United	2015–16	Championship	7	2	0	0	0	0	—		7	2
Rotherham United	2016–17	Championship	2	0	0	0	1	0	—		3	0
Rotherham United	Total		9	2	0	0	1	0	—		10	2
Bradford City (loan)	2015–16	League One	3	0	—		—		1 (Note: Appearance in Football League play-offs)	0	4	0
Bolton Wanderers (loan)	2016–17	League One	21	1	3	0	—		1 (Note: Appearance in EFL Trophy)	0	25	1
ATK	2017–18	Indian Super League	11	1	—		—		—		11	1
Macclesfield	2022–23	NPL Division One West	5	0	—		—		1 (Note: Appearance in Cheshire Senior Cup)	0	6	0
Macclesfield	2023–24	NPL Premier Division	2	0	1	0	—		—		3	0
Macclesfield	Total		7	0	1	0	—		1	0	9	0
Stalybridge Celtic	2023–24	NPL Division One West	1	0	—		—		1	0	2	0
Career totals			59	4	4	0	1	0	4	0	68	4

== Honours ==
=== Club ===
Manchester United Youth

- FA Youth Cup: 2010–11
- Development League: 2012–13

Bolton Wanderers

- League One runner-up: 2016–17

Macclesfield

- Northern Premier League Division One West: 2022–23

=== International ===
England U17

- UEFA European Under-17 Championship: 2010
