= Raúl Correia =

Angolan footballer (born 1993)

Personal information
- Full name: Raúl Edvânio Brito Rodrigues Correia
- Date of birth: 7 May 1993 (age 33)
- Place of birth: Angola
- Position: Striker

Team information
- Current team: Wythenshawe Town

Youth career
- Sheffield

Senior career*
Years	Team	Apps	(Gls)
2013–2015	Cheadle Heath Nomads		
2015	Radcliffe Borough		
2015–2016	Chorley	3	(0)
2016	→ Trafford (loan)		
2016–2017	Radcliffe Borough	22	(11)
2017–2018	Blackpool	0	(0)
2017–2018	→ Guiseley (loan)	11	(1)
2018	→ York City (loan)	10	(1)
2018	Barrow	5	(1)
2018–2019	Radcliffe	1	(0)
2019	Mossley	7	(0)
2019–2020	Southport	24	(3)
2020–2021	Bala Town	23	(2)
2021–2022	Aberystwyth Town	13	(0)
2022–2023	Stalybridge Celtic	55	(18)
2023–	Wythenshawe Town	12	(2)
- * Club domestic league appearances and goals as of 11:52, 1 January 2024 (UTC)

Raúl Edvânio Brito Rodrigues Correia (born 7 May 1993) is an Angolan footballer who plays as a striker for Wythenshawe Town.

After starting his career with Cheadle Heath Nomads, he moved on to Radcliffe Borough then joined Chorley in December 2015. Following a spell at Trafford on a dual registration, he returned to Radcliffe Borough in August 2016 and impressed Football League clubs with his form. Signing for Blackpool for an undisclosed fee in January 2017, he joined Guiseley on loan in July 2017 and York City in January 2018.

== Early life ==
Born in Angola, Correia is a Portuguese citizen and moved to England at the age of nine. He studied business finance management at Sheffield Hallam University and worked at the Royal Bank of Scotland prior to playing professional football.

== Club career ==
=== Early career ===
Correia played youth football for Sheffield before joining Cheshire League side Cheadle Heath Nomads. He then moved on to Northern Premier League Division One North club Radcliffe Borough.

=== Chorley ===
Correia signed for National League North club Chorley on 24 December 2015. On 2 January 2016, he made his debut from the bench in a 1–0 defeat to AFC Fylde.

His next appearance did not come until five weeks later when he replaced Jordan Connerton in a 3–0 Lancashire FA Challenge Trophy victory against Colne. Named as an unused substitute on five occasions, Correia made his final appearance in a 3–1 win against Gainsborough Trinity on 9 April. He was released at the end of the season.

He joined Northern Premier League Division One North club Trafford in February 2016 on a dual registration agreement.

=== Return to Radcliffe Borough ===
In August 2016, Correia rejoined Northern Premier League Division One North club Radcliffe Borough. He made his debut on the opening day of the season in a 2–0 defeat to Brighouse Town, and scored two minutes into a 4–3 defeat to Mossley three days later.

The following month, he scored back-to-back goals in a 3–2 loss to Scarborough Athletic and a 3–1 win against Kendal Town. On 1 November, he scored twice in a 4–0 win against Hyde United. In January 2017, Correia was invited to a one-week trial with Blackpool after impressing in the eighth tier.

=== Blackpool ===
On 31 January 2017, League Two club Blackpool signed Correia for an undisclosed fee. He signed a one-and-a-half-year contract, with the club holding the option to extend his contract by an additional year. He made his professional debut in an EFL Trophy defeat to Shrewsbury Town on 10 January 2018. After a goalless 90 minutes, Shrewsbury won 4–2 on penalties.

Correia signed for National League club Guiseley on 25 July 2017 on a six-month loan. He made his debut on the opening day of the season in a 2–2 home draw with Ebbsfleet United. He scored his first and only goal for Guiseley on 16 September in a 1–1 draw away to Wrexham after guiding Will Hatfield's deflected shot from distance past goalkeeper Luke Coddington. Correia made his final appearance in a 4–0 defeat away to Tranmere Rovers on 30 December, and returned to his parent club two days later.

On 11 January 2018, Correia joined National League North club York City on loan for the remainder of the season. Two days later, he made his debut by starting in a 2–1 home win against Bradford Park Avenue. He scored his first goal for York on 16 January in a 5–3 victory away to A.F.C. Telford United, after dispossessing goalkeeper Ryan Schofield when attempting to clear the ball. He finished the loan with 11 appearances and one goal as York finished 11th in the table.

He was released by Blackpool at the end of the 2017–18 season.

=== 2018-19 season ===
Correia signed for National League club Barrow on 16 July 2018 on a one-year contract with the option of another year. After only five appearances, he left the club in September 2018 and returned to Radcliffe. After only one appearance, he joined Mossley in February 2019, making seven appearances before the end of the season.

=== Southport ===
On 18 July 2019, it was confirmed that Correia had signed for Southport for the upcoming 2019–20 season after a successful pre-season trial. At the time of his signing, manager Liam Watson said, "Raul is everything we're looking for in a striker: he's powerful, direct and has got loads of pace. I'm really pleased by how well Raul has done for us in pre-season and he's hungry to be a success. He has already integrated well with the squad, I've been pleased by how he has performed so far and I'm sure he will be an important player for us this season."

=== Wales ===
In August 2020 he signed for Bala Town.

In August 2021 he signed for Aberystwyth Town.

=== Return to non-League ===
He signed for Stalybridge Celtic in January 2022. He signed for Wythenshawe Town in July 2023, combining his playing with a career as a model.

== Career statistics ==
As of match played 25 August 2018

Appearances and goals by club, season and competition
Club	Season	League			National Cup		League Cup		Other		Total	
Club	Season	Division	Apps	Goals	Apps	Goals	Apps	Goals	Apps	Goals	Apps	Goals
Chorley	2015–16	National League North	3	0	—		—		—		3	0
Blackpool	2016–17	League Two	0	0	—		—		0	0	0	0
Blackpool	2017–18	League One	0	0	—		—		1 (Note: Appearance in EFL Trophy)	0	1	0
Blackpool	Total		0	0	—		—		1	0	1	0
Guiseley (loan)	2017–18	National League	11	1	0	0	—		1 (Note: Appearance in FA Trophy)	0	12	1
York City (loan)	2017–18	National League North	10	1	—		—		—		10	1
Barrow	2018–19	National League	5	1	0	0	—		0	0	5	1
Career total			29	3	0	0	0	0	2	0	31	3
