= 2022–23 Carlisle United F.C. season =

Carlisle United FC
2022–23 season
- Chairman: Andrew Jenkins
- Manager: Paul Simpson
- Stadium: Brunton Park
- League Two: 5th (promoted)
- FA Cup: Second round
- EFL Cup: First round
- EFL Trophy: Group stage
- Top goalscorer: League: Kristian Dennis (20); All: Kristian Dennis (21)
- Highest home attendance: 15,401 vs Bradford City, 20 May 2023
- Lowest home attendance: 1,089 vs Fleetwood Town, 20 September 2022
- Biggest win: 5–1 vs Barrow, 31 January 2023
- Biggest defeat: 0–4 vs Mansfield Town, 14 February 2023
Home colours	Away colours

The 2022–23 season was the 118th season in the existence of Carlisle United Football Club and the club's ninth consecutive season in League Two. In addition to the league, they also competed in the 2022–23 FA Cup, the 2022–23 EFL Cup and the 2022–23 EFL Trophy. Carlisle United qualified for the Play-offs and won the Final against Stockport County and were promoted to the EFL League One for the 2023–24 season.

== Squad statistics ==
As of 28 May 2023

No.	Pos	Nat	Player	Total		League Two		League Two Play-Offs		FA Cup		League Cup		EFL Trophy	
No.	Pos	Nat	Player	Apps	Goals	Apps	Goals	Apps	Goals	Apps	Goals	Apps	Goals	Apps	Goals
1	GK	(Czech Republic) CZE	Tomáš Holý	52	0	46+0	0	3+0	0	2+0	0	1+0	0	0+0	0
2	DF	(England) ENG	Joel Senior	16	1	12+1	1	3+0	0	0+0	0	0+0	0	0+0	0
3	DF	(Scotland) SCO	Jack Armer	53	2	46+0	2	3+0	0	2+0	0	1+0	0	0+1	0
4	MF	(England) ENG	Owen Moxon	54	6	45+0	6	3+0	0	2+0	0	0+1	0	2+1	0
5	DF	(England) ENG	Morgan Feeney	34	3	29+2	3	0+0	0	1+0	0	0+0	0	2+0	0
6	DF	(England) ENG	Paul Huntington	45	2	39+1	2	3+0	0	2+0	0	0+0	0	0+0	0
7	MF	(England) ENG	Jordan Gibson	54	3	30+15	2	0+3	0	2+0	1	0+1	0	1+2	0
8	MF	(England) ENG	Callum Guy	52	4	45+0	3	3+0	1	1+0	0	1+0	0	0+2	0
9	FW	(England) ENG	Ryan Edmondson	30	6	13+10	4	0+3	0	1+0	1	1+0	1	0+2	0
10	FW	(England) ENG	Omari Patrick	38	5	18+14	4	1+2	1	0+0	0	1+0	0	2+0	0
11	MF	(England) ENG	Brennan Dickenson	0	0	0+0	0	0+0	0	0+0	0	0+0	0	0+0	0
12	MF	(England) ENG	Sonny Hilton (recalled)	10	0	0+7	0	0+0	0	0+0	0	1+0	0	2+0	0
13	GK	(England) ENG	Gabriel Breeze	0	0	0+0	0	0+0	0	0+0	0	0+0	0	0+0	0
14	FW	(England) ENG	Kristian Dennis	48	21	35+9	20	0+2	0	1+0	0	0+1	1	0+0	0
15	MF	(England) ENG	Taylor Charters	19	1	7+4	1	0+3	0	2+0	0	0+0	0	3+0	0
16	FW	(England) ENG	Tobi Sho-Silva	9	0	0+7	0	0+0	0	1+1	0	0+0	0	0+0	0
17	MF	(Republic of Ireland) IRL	Corey Whelan	33	2	17+8	2	3+0	0	1+0	0	1+0	0	3+0	0
18	MF	(England) ENG	Josh Dixon	0	0	0+0	0	0+0	0	0+0	0	0+0	0	0+0	0
20	DF	(England) ENG	Jack Ellis	17	0	11+1	0	0+0	0	2+0	0	0+0	0	3+0	0
22	DF	(England) ENG	Jon Mellish	50	6	43+0	6	1+0	0	2+0	0	1+0	0	0+3	0
25	DF	(England) ENG	Fin Back	19	0	18+0	0	0+0	0	0+0	0	1+0	0	0+0	0
26	DF	(England) ENG	Ben Barclay	17	2	12+1	1	2+0	1	0+1	0	1+0	0	0+0	0
27	FW	(England) ENG	Nic Bollado	4	0	0+1	0	0+0	0	0+1	0	0+0	0	1+1	0
28	MF	(Republic of Ireland) IRL	Jamie Devitt	14	1	0+12	0	0+0	0	0+0	0	0+1	0	1+0	1
29	MF	(England) ENG	Jayden Harris	24	1	3+15	0	0+0	0	0+2	1	1+0	0	3+0	0
30	GK	(Republic of Ireland) IRL	Michael Kelly	3	0	0+0	0	0+0	0	0+0	0	0+0	0	3+0	0
31	MF	(England) ENG	Ryan Carr	1	0	0+0	0	0+0	0	0+0	0	0+0	0	1+0	0
32	FW	(Scotland) SCO	Jack Stretton (recalled)	23	2	9+9	2	0+0	0	0+1	0	0+1	0	3+0	0
33	DF	(England) ENG	Duncan Idehen (recalled)	5	1	0+2	0	0+0	0	0+0	0	0+0	0	3+0	1
33	DF	(England) ENG	Jack Robinson	8	0	1+6	0	0+1	0	0+0	0	0+0	0	0+0	0
35	MF	(Northern Ireland) NIR	Alfie McCalmont	19	2	11+5	2	3+0	0	0+0	0	0+0	0	0+0	0
36	FW	(England) ENG	John-Kymani Gordon	17	2	8+7	2	1+1	0	0+0	0	0+0	0	0+0	0
41	FW	(England) ENG	Joe Garner	22	2	8+11	2	3+0	0	0+0	0	0+0	0	0+0	0

== Transfers ==
=== In ===
Date	Pos	Player	Transferred from	Fee	Ref
23 June 2022	CF	(England) Ryan Edmondson	(England) Leeds United	Undisclosed	
1 July 2022 (Note: The transfer was announced on 9 June, and would become official on July 1 once his Ipswich Town contract expired)	GK	(Czech Republic) Tomáš Holý	(England) Ipswich Town	Free transfer	
1 July 2022 (Note: The transfer was announced on 19 May, and would become official on July 1 once his Annan Athletic contract expired)	CM	(England) Owen Moxon	(Scotland) Annan Athletic	Free transfer	
30 July 2022	GK	(Republic of Ireland) Michael Kelly	(Republic of Ireland) Bray Wanderers	Undisclosed	
2 August 2022	CM	(England) Jayden Harris	(England) Aldershot Town	Undisclosed	
10 August 2022	CB	(England) Paul Huntington	(England) Preston North End	Free Transfer	
19 January 2023	CF	(England) Joe Garner	(England) Fleetwood Town	Undisclosed	

=== Out ===
Date	Pos	Player	Transferred to	Fee	Ref
30 June 2022	SS	(England) Lewis Alessandra	(England) South Shields	Released	
30 June 2022	CB	(England) Joshua Barnett	(England) Horden Community Welfare	Released	
30 June 2022	CM	(England) Danny Devine	(England) Chester	Released	
30 June 2022	MF	(England) Dylan Garvey	(England) Consett	Released	
30 June 2022	GK	(England) Mark Howard	(Wales) Wrexham	Released	
30 June 2022	CF	(England) Manasse Mampala	(England) Hyde United	Released	
30 June 2022	CB	(England) Rod McDonald	(England) Crewe Alexandra	Released	
30 June 2022	RB	(England) Kelvin Mellor	(England) Crewe Alexandra	Released	
30 June 2022	GK	(England) Magnus Norman	(England) Oldham Athletic	Rejected contract	
30 June 2022 (Note: The transfer was announced on 13 June, and would become official on 1 July once his contract expired)	DM	(England) Joe Riley	(England) Walsall	Free transfer	
30 June 2022	MF	(England) DJ Taylor	(England) Penrith	Released	
30 June 2022	LW	(France) Gime Touré	(England) Yeovil Town	Released	
30 June 2022	MF	(England) Charlie Watt	(England) Spennymoor Town	Released	
5 July 2022	CF	(England) Tristan Abrahams	(England) Eastleigh	Free transfer	
31 January 2023	MF	(England) Ryan Carr	(England) Ipswich Town	Undisclosed	

=== Loans in ===
Date	Pos	Player	Loaned from	On loan until	Ref
22 June 2022	AM	(England) Sonny Hilton	(England) Fulham	4 January 2023 (Note: On 4 January, Hilton's loan from Fulham was cut short)	
4 July 2022	CB	(England) Ben Barclay	(England) Stockport County	End of Season	
14 July 2022	RB	(England) Fin Back	(England) Nottingham Forest	End of Season	
4 August 2022	CF	(Scotland) Jack Stretton	(England) Derby County	7 January 2023 (Note: On 7 January, Stretton was recalled back to Derby)	
18 August 2022	CB	(England) Duncan Idehen	(England) Bristol City	8 December 2022 (Note: On 8 December, Idehen returned to Bristol City.)	
3 January 2023	LB	(England) Jack Robinson	(England) Middlesbrough	End of Season	
9 January 2023	CM	(Northern Ireland) Alfie McCalmont	(England) Leeds United	End of Season	
13 January 2023	CF	(England) John-Kymani Gordon	(England) Crystal Palace	End of Season	

=== Loans out ===
Date	Pos	Player	Loaned to	On loan until	Ref
27 July 2022	DF	(England) Max Kilsby	(Scotland) Annan Athletic	End of Season	
28 July 2022	CF	(England) Sam Fishburn	(England) Blyth Spartans	6 September 2022	
13 August 2022	RW	(England) Lewis Bell	(Scotland) Gretna 2008	End of Season	
12 September 2022	CF	(England) Sam Fishburn	(England) Morpeth Town	End of Season	
27 September 2022	GK	(England) Gabriel Breeze	(England) Widnes	27 October 2022	

== Pre-season and friendlies ==
On 13 May, Carlisle United announced the first three of their pre-season friendlies, against Penrith, Kendal Town and Workington Two more matches were added on 20 May. Two more friendlies against Bolton Wanderers and Morecambe were confirmed.

Win Draw Loss Fixtures

1 July 2022 Friendly	Penrith	1–5	Carlisle United	Penrith
19:00 BST	Murray-Jones 49'	Report	Edmondson 32'; Gibson 52'; Bollado 54'; Dennis 68', 72'	Stadium: Frenchfield Park; Attendance: 1,040; Referee: Scott Taylor

6 July 2022 Friendly	Kendal Town	0–9	Carlisle United	Kendal
19:30 BST		Report	Sho-Silva 6', 28'; Dennis 22'; Hilton 26', 32'; Bollado 72'; Devitt 79', 83', 90'	Stadium: Parkside Road

9 July 2022 Friendly	Workington	0–3	Carlisle United	Workington
15:00 BST		Report	Edmondson 11', 29'; 90' (o.g.)	Stadium: Borough Park; Attendance: 1,096; Referee: Anthony Backhouse

12 July 2022 Friendly	Carlisle United	1–1	Greenock Morton	Carlisle
14:00 BST	Dickenson 59'	Report	Gillespie 72' (pen.)	Stadium: Sheepmount Athletics Stadium; Attendance: 0 (behind-closed-doors); Referee: Anthony Backhouse

16 July 2022 Friendly	Carlisle United	3–1	Bolton Wanderers	Carlisle
15:00 BST	Edmondson 19'; Barclay 38'; Dennis 52'	Report	Morley 50' (pen.)	Stadium: Brunton Park; Attendance: 2,239; Referee: Anthony Backhouse

19 July 2022 Friendly	Livingston	1–0	Carlisle United	Largs, Scotland
14:00 BST		Report		Stadium: Inverclyde National Training Centre; Attendance: 0 (behind-closed-doors)

23 July 2022 Friendly	Morecambe	0–0	Carlisle United	Morecambe
15:00 BST		Report		Stadium: Mazuma Stadium; Attendance: 1,430; Referee: Sam Barrott

Mid-season

2 August 2022 Friendly	Gretna 2008	0–1	Carlisle United	Gretna, Scotland
19:00 BST		Report	Hilton 48'	Stadium: Raydale Park; Attendance: 235

== Competitions ==
=== Overall record ===
Competition	First match	Last match	Starting round	Record							
Competition	First match	Last match	Starting round	Pld	W	D	L	GF	GA	GD	Win %
League Two	30 July 2022	8 May 2023	Matchday 1	46	20	16	10	66	43	+23	43.48
L2 Playoffs	13 May 2023	28 May 2023	Semi Finals	3	2	0	1	4	3	+1	66.67
FA Cup	5 November 2022	26 November 2022	First round	2	1	0	1	3	3	+0	50.00
EFL Cup	9 August 2022	9 August 2022	First round	1	0	0	1	2	3	−1	0.00
EFL Trophy	30 August 2022	18 October 2022	Group stage	3	0	1	2	2	5	−3	0.00
Total				55	23	17	15	77	57	+20	41.82

Last updated: 29 May 2023
Source: [ Soccerway]

=== League Two ===
==== League table ====
Pos	Team	Pld	W	D	L	GF	GA	GD	Pts	Promotion, qualification or relegation
2	Stevenage (P)	46	24	13	9	61	39	+22	85	Promotion to EFL League One
3	Northampton Town (P)	46	23	14	9	62	42	+20	83	Promotion to EFL League One
4	Stockport County	46	22	13	11	65	37	+28	79	Qualification for League Two play-offs
5	Carlisle United (O, P)	46	20	16	10	66	43	+23	76	Qualification for League Two play-offs
6	Bradford City	46	20	16	10	61	43	+18	76	Qualification for League Two play-offs
7	Salford City	46	22	9	15	72	54	+18	75	Qualification for League Two play-offs
8	Mansfield Town	46	21	12	13	72	55	+17	75	

Source: EFL Official Website
Rules for classification: 1) Points; 2) Goal difference; 3) Number of goals scored; 4) Head-to-head results; 5) Wins; 6) Away goals; 7) Penalty points (sec 9.5); 8) 12-point sending off offences
(O) Play-off winners; (P) Promoted

==== Results summary ====
Overall								Home						Away					
Pld	W	D	L	GF	GA	GD	Pts	W	D	L	GF	GA	GD	W	D	L	GF	GA	GD
46	20	16	10	66	43	+23	76	11	9	4	34	21	+13	9	7	6	32	22	+10

Last updated: 29 May 2023.
Source: [ Soccerway]

==== Results by round ====
Round	1	2	3	4	5	6	7	8	9	10	11	12	13	14	15	16	17	18	19	20	21	22	23	24	25	26	27	28	29	30	31	32	33	34	35	36	37	38	39	40	41	42	43	44	45	46
Ground	H	A	H	A	H	H	A	H	A	A	H	A	H	H	A	A	A	H	A	H	A	H	A	A	H	H	A	H	H	A	H	H	A	H	A	H	A	A	A	H	A	H	H	A	H	A
Result	W	D	D	L	W	D	D	W	D	W	D	W	W	L	L	W	D	D	W	D	L	W	W	L	W	W	W	W	L	D	L	W	W	W	W	D	D	L	L	W	D	D	D	W	L	D
Position	10	9	10	14	11	12	13	13	12	8	9	7	6	7	10	7	7	8	6	5	7	4	4	4	4	4	4	3	3	3	3	3	2	2	2	4	3	4	4	3	4	5	5	5	5	5

Updated to match(es) played on 29 May 2023. Source: [ Soccerway]
A = Away; H = Home; W = Win; D = Draw; L = Loss; P = Postponed

==== Matches ====
Win Draw Loss Fixtures

On 23 June, the league fixtures were announced.

30 July 2022 1	Carlisle United	1–0	Crawley Town	Carlisle
15:00 BST	Dennis 5'	Report		Stadium: Brunton Park; Attendance: 6,403; Referee: Thomas Kirk

6 August 2022 2	Colchester United	1–1	Carlisle United	Colchester
15:00 BST	Chilvers 19'	Report	Dennis 44'	Stadium: Colchester Community Stadium; Attendance: 3,137; Referee: James Oldham

13 August 2022 3	Carlisle United	1–1	Swindon Town	Carlisle
15:00 BST	Dennis 45'	Report	Wakeling 22'	Stadium: Brunton Park; Attendance: 5,602; Referee: Andrew Kitchen

16 August 2022	Grimsby Town	Abandoned	Carlisle United	Cleethorpes
19:45 BST				Stadium: Blundell Park; Referee: Simon Mather
Note: Match was abandoned after 34 minutes due to a waterlogged pitch.

20 August 2022 4	Stevenage	2–1	Carlisle United	Stevenage
15:00 BST	Smith 16'; Clark 42'	Report	Dennis 45+2'	Stadium: Broadhall Way; Attendance: 2,514; Referee: Craig Hicks

27 August 2022 5	Carlisle United	1–0	Gillingham	Carlisle
15:00 BST	Mellish 55'	Report		Stadium: Brunton Park; Attendance: 5,261; Referee: Marc Edwards

3 September 2022 6	Carlisle United	3–3	Rochdale	Carlisle
15:00 BST	Mellish 36'; Dennis 58'; Huntington 78'	Report	Quigley 22' 53'; Rodney 51'	Stadium: Brunton Park; Attendance: 5,023; Referee: Adam Herczeg

10 September 2022	Harrogate Town	Postponed	Carlisle United	Harrogate
15:00 BST				Stadium: The EnviroVent Stadium
Note: Fixture was postponed as a mark of respect following the passing of Queen Elizabeth II.

13 September 2022 7	Mansfield Town	0–0	Carlisle United	Mansfield
19:45 BST		Report		Stadium: Field Mill; Attendance: 5,421; Referee: Sam Allison

17 September 2022 8	Carlisle United	2–1	AFC Wimbledon	Carlisle
15:00 BST	Guy 45'; Dennis 81'	Report	Assal 59'	Stadium: Brunton Park; Attendance: 5,038; Referee: Andy Haines

24 September 2022 9	Newport County	1–1	Carlisle United	Newport
15:00 BST	Moriah-Welsh 30'	Report	Whelan 76'	Stadium: Rodney Parade; Attendance: 3,876; Referee: Keith Stroud

27 September 2022 10	Grimsby Town	1–2	Carlisle United	Cleethorpes
19:45 BST	Efete 65'	Report	Moxon 7'; Dennis 44'	Stadium: Blundell Park; Attendance: 6,447; Referee: Simon Mather

1 October 2022 11	Carlisle United	0–0	Crewe Alexandra	Carlisle
15:00 BST		Report		Stadium: Brunton Park; Attendance: 5,012; Referee: Ross Joyce

8 October 2022 12	Hartlepool United	1–3	Carlisle United	Hartlepool
15:00 BST	Lacey 43'	Report	Moxon 53'; Patrick 75' 82'	Stadium: Victoria Park; Attendance: 5,525; Referee: Tom Reeves

15 October 2022 13	Carlisle United	3–0	Doncaster Rovers	Carlisle
15:00 BST	Guy 44'; Stretton 53' 66'; Edmondson (penalty missed) 90+3'	Report		Stadium: Brunton Park; Attendance: 5,600; Referee: Peter Wright

22 October 2022 14	Carlisle United	2–3	Leyton Orient	Carlisle
15:00 BST	Edmondson 15' (red card) 36'; Gibson 56'	Report	Archibald 2' 17'; Drinan 50'	Stadium: Brunton Park; Attendance: 5,519; Referee: Thomas Parsons

25 October 2022 15	Stockport County	2–0	Carlisle United	Stockport
19:45 BST	Hippolyte 20'; Wootton 57'	Report		Stadium: Edgeley Park; Attendance: 8,418; Referee: Ben Speedie

29 October 2022 16	Tranmere Rovers	0–2	Carlisle United	Birkenhead
15:00 BST		Report	Dennis 1' 54' (pen.)	Stadium: Prenton Park; Attendance: 6,756; Referee: Carl Boyeson

8 November 2022 17	Harrogate Town	3–3	Carlisle United	Harrogate
19:45 GMT	Armstrong 28'; Burrell 60'; Headley 76'	Report	Charters 12'; Edmondson 50'; Moxon 90+3'	Stadium: Wetherby Road; Attendance: 2,147; Referee: Thomas Kirk

12 November 2022 18	Carlisle United	0–0	Walsall	Carlisle
15:00 GMT		Report		Stadium: Brunton Park; Attendance: 5,493; Referee: Ollie Yates

19 November 2022 19	Salford City	1–4	Carlisle United	Salford
15:00 GMT	Smith 52'	Report	Dennis 3' 80'; Guy 67'; Whelan 72'	Stadium: Moor Lane; Attendance: 3,454; Referee: Sunny Sukhvir Gill

3 December 2022 20	Carlisle United	1–1	Sutton United	Carlisle
13:00 GMT	Edmondson 30'	Report	Randall 45'	Stadium: Brunton Park; Attendance: 4,752; Referee: Lewis Smith

10 December 2022	Carlisle United	Postponed	Barrow	Carlisle
15:00 GMT				Stadium: Brunton Park
Note: Fixture was postponed due to a frozen pitch.

17 December 2022	Northampton Town	Postponed	Carlisle United	Northampton
15:00 GMT				Stadium: Sixfields Stadium
Note: Fixture was postponed due to a frozen pitch.

20 December 2022 21	Northampton Town	2–1	Carlisle United	Northampton
19:45 GMT	Sherring 53'; Appéré 56'	Report	Armer 50'	Stadium: PTS Academy Stadium; Attendance: 4,583; Referee: Marc Edwards

26 December 2022 22	Carlisle United	1–0	Bradford City	Carlisle
15:00 GMT	Huntington 34'	Report		Stadium: Brunton Park; Attendance: 8,296; Referee: Adam Herczeg

29 December 2022 23	Crewe Alexandra	0–3	Carlisle United	Crewe
19:00 GMT	Offord (red card) 51'	Report	Feeney 6'; Moxon 46'; Dennis 72'	Stadium: Gresty Road; Attendance: 4,493 (820 away); Referee: Andy Haines

1 January 2023 24	Doncaster Rovers	2–1	Carlisle United	Doncaster
15:00 GMT	Maxwell 5'; Hurst 67'	Report	Dennis 87'	Stadium: Eco-Power Stadium; Attendance: 7,143 (1,222 away); Referee: Ben Speedie

14 January 2023 25	Carlisle United	2–0	Newport County	Carlisle
15:00 GMT	Dennis 45+2'; Gordon 57'	Report		Stadium: Brunton Park; Attendance: 5,603 (168 away); Referee: Martin Woods

21 January 2023	Bradford City	Postponed	Carlisle United	Bradford
15:00 GMT				Stadium: Valley Parade
Note: Fixture was postponed due to a frozen pitch.

24 January 2023 26	Carlisle United	3–1	Hartlepool United	Carlisle
19:45 GMT	Feeney 6'; Dennis 26' 66'	Report	Umerah 28'	Stadium: Brunton Park; Attendance: 5,172 (342 away); Referee: Samuel Barrott

28 January 2023 27	Rochdale	0–1	Carlisle United	Rochdale
15:00 GMT		Report	Gordon 8'	Stadium: Spotland Stadium; Attendance: 4,042 (1,634 away); Referee: Ross Joyce

31 January 2023 28	Carlisle United	5–1	Barrow	Carlisle
19:45 GMT	Jon Mellish 44' 67'; Joe Garner 50'; Patrick 72'; Dennis 89' (pen.)	Report	Barclay 84' (o.g.)	Stadium: Brunton Park; Attendance: 9,351 (965 away); Referee: Andrew Kitchen

4 February 2023 29	Carlisle United	0–1	Harrogate Town	Carlisle
15:00 GMT		Report	Huntington 82' (o.g.)	Stadium: Brunton Park; Attendance: 6,422 (123 away); Referee: Robert Lewis

11 February 2023 30	AFC Wimbledon	0–0	Carlisle United	Wimbledon
15:00 GMT		Report		Stadium: Cherry Red Records Stadium; Attendance: 7,876 (1,024 away); Referee: Darren Handley

14 February 2023 31	Carlisle United	0–4	Mansfield Town	Carlisle
19:45 GMT		Report	Clarke 14'; Kilgour 25'; Akins 29' (pen.); Hewitt 38'	Stadium: Brunton Park; Attendance: 4,645 (212 away); Referee: Ben Toner

18 February 2023 32	Carlisle United	1–0	Colchester United	Carlisle
15:00 GMT	McCalmont 4'	Report		Stadium: Brunton Park; Attendance: 5,550 (148 away); Referee: Neil Hair

25 February 2023 33	Crawley Town	2–5	Carlisle United	Crawley
15:00 GMT	Oteh 50'; Telford 84'	Report	Senior 15'; Patrick 20'; Moxon 26'; Feeney 38'; Mellish 57'	Stadium: Broadfield Stadium; Attendance: 2,970 (504 away); Referee: Paul Howard

4 March 2023 34	Carlisle United	2–0	Grimsby Town	Carlisle
15:00 GMT	McCalmont 36'; Gibson 44'	Report		Stadium: Brunton Park; Attendance: 6,561 (428 away); Referee: Marc Edwards

11 March 2023 35	Swindon Town	1–2	Carlisle United	Swindon
15:00 GMT	Shade 80'	Report	Armer 51'; Edmondson 90+6'	Stadium: County Ground; Attendance: 9,330 (558 away); Referee: Sam Purkiss

18 March 2023 36	Carlisle United	0–0	Stevenage	Carlisle
15:00 GMT		Report		Stadium: Brunton Park; Attendance: 8,029 (141 away); Referee: Tom Reeves

21 March 2023 37	Bradford City	0–0	Carlisle United	Bradford
19:45 GMT		Report		Stadium: Valley Parade; Attendance: 17,653 (1,208 away); Referee: Will Finnie

25 March 2023 38	Gillingham	1–0	Carlisle United	Gillingham
15:00 GMT	Williams 90+4'	Report		Stadium: MEMS Priestfield Stadium; Attendance: 6,110 (475 away); Referee: Charles Breakspear

1 April 2023 39	Leyton Orient	1–0	Carlisle United	Leyton
15:00 BST	Mellish 73' (o.g.); Kelman (yellow card) 33' (yellow-red card) 77'	Report		Stadium: Brisbane Road; Attendance: 8,713 (1,177 away); Referee: Ben Speedie

7 April 2023 40	Carlisle United	2–0	Tranmere Rovers	Carlisle
15:00 BST	Dennis 3' 39'	Report		Stadium: Brunton Park; Attendance: 13,410 (716 away); Referee: Thomas Kirk

10 April 2023 41	Walsall	0–0	Carlisle United	Bescot
15:00 BST	White (red card) 61'	Report		Stadium: Poundland Bescot Stadium; Attendance: 6,117 (1,086 away); Referee: Declan Bourne

15 April 2023 42	Carlisle United	0–0	Northampton Town	Carlisle
15:00 BST		Report		Stadium: Brunton Park; Attendance: 8,292 (589 away); Referee: Rebecca Welch

18 April 2023 43	Carlisle United	2–2	Stockport County	Carlisle
19:45 BST	Mellish 54'; Moxon 83'	Report	Hippolyte 31'; Lemonheigh-Evans 86'	Stadium: Brunton Park; Attendance: 7,198 (1,052 away); Referee: Thomas Parsons

22 April 2023 44	Barrow	0–1	Carlisle United	Barrow-in-Furness
15:00 BST		Report	Barclay 16'	Stadium: Holker Street; Attendance: 4,515 (640 away); Referee: James Bell

29 April 2023 45	Carlisle United	2–3	Salford City	Carlisle
15:00 BST	Garner 77'; Mellish (red card) 83'; Dennis 85' (pen.)	Report	Bolton 28', 88'	Stadium: Brunton Park; Attendance: 10,927 (469 away); Referee: Sebastian Stockbridge

8 May 2023 46	Sutton United	1–1	Carlisle United	Sutton
12:30 BST	Kouassi 17'	Report	Robinson (yellow card) 46'; Kizzi 85' (o.g.)	Stadium: VBS Community Stadium; Attendance: 4,771 (1,366 away); Referee: Darren Drysdale

==== Play-offs ====
14 May 2023 SF L1	Bradford City	1–0	Carlisle United	Bradford
19:00	Walker 18'	Report		Stadium: Valley Parade; Attendance: 20,575 (2,415 away); Referee: Ross Joyce

20 May 2023 SF L2	Carlisle United	3–1 (a.e.t.)	Bradford City	Carlisle
15:00	Halliday 21' (o.g.); Guy 98'; Barclay 112'	Report	Derbyshire 106'	Stadium: Brunton Park; Attendance: 15,401 (1,948 away); Referee: Simon Mather

Carlisle United won 3–2 on Aggregate.

28 May 2023 Final	Stockport County	1–1 (a.e.t.) (4–5 p)	Carlisle United	Wembley Stadium, London
13:30 BST	Mellish 34' (o.g.)	Report	Patrick 84'	Attendance: 34,004; Referee: Tom Nield
	Penalties
	Lemonheigh-Evans (penalty scored); Rydel (penalty missed); Hippolyte (penalty scored); Stretton (penalty scored); Collar (penalty scored)		(penalty scored) Dennis; (penalty scored) Mellish; (penalty scored) Edmondson; (penalty scored) Moxon; (penalty scored) Charters

Carlisle United promoted to EFL League One

=== FA Cup ===
The Cumbrians were drawn at home to Tranmere Rovers in the first round and away to Walsall in the second round.

Win Draw Loss Fixtures

5 November 2022 First round	Carlisle United	2–1	Tranmere Rovers	Carlisle
15:00 BST	Gibson 30'; Harris 66'	Report	Byrne 82'	Stadium: Brunton Park; Attendance: 4,154; Referee: Declan Bourne

26 November 2022 Second round	Walsall	2–1	Carlisle United	Bescot
15:00 GMT	Williams 88'; James-Taylor 90+3'	Report	Edmondson 29'	Stadium: Poundland Bescot Stadium; Attendance: 3,499; Referee: Scott Oldham

=== EFL Cup ===
Win Draw Loss Fixtures

Carlisle were drawn away to Shrewsbury Town in the first round.

9 August 2022 First round	Shrewsbury Town	3–2	Carlisle United	Shrewsbury
19:45 BST	Leahy 45+1'; Udoh 75'; Dunkley 86'	Report	Edmondson 13'; Dennis 81'	Stadium: New Meadow; Attendance: 2,269; Referee: Chris Pollard

=== EFL Trophy ===
On 20 June, the initial Group stage draw was made, grouping Carlisle United with Barrow and Fleetwood Town. Three days later, Manchester United U21s joined Northern Group G.

Pos	Div	Team	Pld	W	PW	PL	L	GF	GA	GD	Pts	Qualification
1	ACA	Manchester United U21	3	2	0	1	0	6	4	+2	7	Advance to Round 2
2	L2	Barrow	3	1	1	0	1	4	3	+1	5	Advance to Round 2
3	L1	Fleetwood Town	3	0	1	2	0	4	4	0	4	
4	L2	Carlisle United	3	0	1	0	2	2	5	−3	2	

Source: EFL.com

Win Draw Loss Fixtures

30 August 2022 Group stage	Carlisle United	1–2	Manchester United U21	Carlisle
19:30 BST	Devitt 66'	Report	McNeill 40'; Forson 71'	Stadium: Brunton Park; Attendance: 3,331; Referee: Ben Toner

20 September 2022 Group stage	Carlisle United	1–1 (4–2 p)	Fleetwood Town	Carlisle
19:00 BST	Idehen 90'	Report	Garner 46'	Stadium: Brunton Park; Attendance: 1,089; Referee: Rebecca Welch
	Penalties
	Gibson (penalty missed); Stretton (penalty scored); Whelan (penalty scored); Mellish (penalty scored); Charters (penalty scored)		Morton (penalty scored); Andrew (penalty scored); Batty (penalty missed); Vela (penalty missed)

18 October 2022 Group stage	Barrow	2–0	Carlisle United	Barrow-in-Furness
19:00 BST	Kay 70'; Foley 80'	Report		Stadium: Holker Street; Attendance: 2,281; Referee: Seb Stocksbridge
