= 2017–18 Professional U18 Development League =

U18 Premier League
- Season: 2017–18
- Champions: Chelsea U18s (2nd Title)
- Matches: 265
- Goals: 1,009 (3.81 per match)
- Top goalscorer: (England) Reo Griffiths Tottenham Hotspur U18s (26 Goals)
- Biggest home win: Tottenham Hotspur U18s 9–0 Arsenal U18s (24 April 2018)
- Biggest away win: West Bromwich Albion U18s 1–7 Everton U18s (26 August 2017)
- Highest scoring: Derby County U18s 5–5 Wolverhampton Wanderers U18s (18 November 2017)
- Longest winning run: 7 Matches – Chelsea U18s
- Longest unbeaten run: 12 Matches – Chelsea U18s
- Longest winless run: 11 Matches – Blackburn Rovers U18s
- Longest losing run: 11 Matches – Blackburn Rovers U18s

The 2017-18 Under-18 Premier League is the fifth campaign of the top tier of the Under-18 Development League. A total of 24 teams are split regionally into north and south leagues.The format was changed completely this season. Instead of playing in the merit group stage format, teams face their regional opponents both home and away before the top two face each other to determine the national champion. No teams were added this season. As a result, 22 games were played in both the North and South Divisions. Chelsea U18s are the defending champions.

== North ==
Pos	Team	Pld	W	D	L	GF	GA	GD	Pts	
1	Manchester United U18s (C, Q)	22	15	3	4	65	33	+32	48	Qualification for the National Final
2	Manchester City U18s	22	13	3	6	58	34	+24	42	
3	Liverpool U18s	22	11	5	6	50	35	+15	38	
4	Stoke City U18s	22	11	4	7	49	34	+15	37	
5	Everton U18s	22	11	4	7	51	41	+10	37	
6	Derby County U18s	22	9	6	7	45	38	+7	33	
7	Sunderland U18s	22	10	2	10	39	44	−5	32	
8	West Bromwich Albion U18s	22	7	5	10	49	57	−8	26	
9	Middlesbrough U18s	22	6	7	9	37	52	−15	25	
10	Newcastle United U18s	22	6	6	10	37	48	−11	24	
11	Wolverhampton Wanderers U18s	22	5	4	13	31	53	−22	19	
12	Blackburn Rovers U18s	22	3	1	18	28	70	−42	10	

Updated to match(es) played on unknown. Source: Premier League Under 18 Table
(C) Champions; (Q) Qualified for the phase indicated

== South ==
Pos	Team	Pld	W	D	L	GF	GA	GD	Pts	
1	Chelsea U18s (C, Q)	22	17	3	2	64	21	+43	54	Qualification for the National Final
2	Arsenal U18s	22	14	3	5	61	33	+28	45	
3	Southampton U18s	22	13	3	6	38	25	+13	42	
4	Tottenham Hotspur U18s	22	10	4	8	58	39	+19	34	
5	Leicester City U18s	22	9	6	7	38	33	+5	33	
6	Swansea City U18s	22	9	4	9	32	44	−12	31	
7	Fulham U18s	22	8	6	8	40	33	+7	30	
8	Brighton & Hove Albion U18s	22	6	6	10	36	43	−7	24	
9	Aston Villa U18s	22	6	5	11	27	36	−9	23	
10	West Ham United U18s	22	6	3	13	27	51	−24	21	
11	Reading U18s	22	6	3	13	24	50	−26	21	
12	Norwich City U18s	22	3	4	15	22	59	−37	13	

Updated to match(es) played on unknown. Source: Premier League Under 18 Table
(C) Champions; (Q) Qualified for the phase indicated

=== National Final ===
5 May 2018
7:00

Manchester United U18s	0–3	Chelsea U18s
	Report	Sterling 4'; Gilmour 58'; Lamptey 64'

Leigh Sports Village, Leigh
Attendance: 1,303
Referee: Conor Brown

=== Top goalscorers ===
As of 5 May 2018

Rank	Player	Club	Goals
1	(England) Reo Griffiths	Tottenham Hotspur U18s	26
2	(England) Mason Greenwood	Manchester United U18s	16
3	(England) Anthony Gordon	Everton U18s	14
4	(England) Keyendrah Simmonds	Manchester City U18s	13
4	(England) Stephen Walker	Middlesbrough U18s	13
6	(England) Charlie Brown	Chelsea U18s	12
6	(Democratic Republic of the Congo) Manasse Mampala	Everton U18s	12
6	(Morocco) Nabil Touaizi	Manchester City U18s	12
6	(England) Rayhaan Tulloch	West Bromwich Albion U18s	12
10	(Switzerland) Nishan Burkart	Manchester United U18s	11
10	(England) Jordan Greenidge	Stoke City U18s	11
12	(Scotland) Kyle Connell	Blackburn Rovers U18s	10
12	(Iceland) Stefan Ljubicic	Brighton & Hove Albion U18s	10
12	(Sweden) Benjamin Mbunga-Kimpioka	Sunderland U18s	10
15	(England) Timmy Abraham	Fulham U18s	9
15	(Nigeria) Korede Adedoyin	Everton U18s	9
15	(United States) Folarin Balogun	Arsenal U18s	9
15	(Republic of Ireland) Adam Idah	Norwich City U18s	9
15	(England) Curtis Jones	Liverpool U18s	9
15	(Republic of Ireland) Glen McAuley	Liverpool U18s	9
15	(Germany) Felix Nmecha	Manchester City U18s	9
15	(Republic of Ireland) Michael Obafemi	Southampton U18s	9
15	(England) Austin Samuels	Wolverhampton Wanderers U18s	9
15	(Denmark) Elias Sorensen	Newcastle United U18s	9
15	(England) Martell Taylor-Crossdale	Chelsea U18s	9
15	(England) Conor Tee	Leicester City U18s	9
15	(England) Cameron Thompson	Fulham U18s	9

=== Hat-tricks ===
As of 9 May 2018

Player	For	Against	Result	Date	Ref.
(England) Cameron Thompson	Fulham U18s	Arsenal U18s	4–1 (H)	12 August 2017	
(England) Anthony Gordon	Everton U18s	West Bromwich Albion U18s	1–7 (A)	26 August 2017	
(England) Emile Smith-Rowe	Arsenal U18s	West Ham United U18s	6–1 (H)	26 August 2017	
(Germany) Felix Nmecha	Manchester City U18s	Blackburn Rovers U18s	5–1 (H)	9 September 2017	
(England) Cameron Thompson	Fulham U18s	Reading U18s	2–5 (A)	9 September 2017	
(Wales) Rabbi Matondo	Manchester City U18s	Sunderland U18s	6–2 (H)	30 September 2017	
(England) Martell Taylor-Crossdale	Chelsea U18s	Fulham U18s	6–1 (H)	30 September 2017	
(England) Jordan Greenidge	Stoke City U18s	Blackburn Rovers U18s	6–0 (H)	14 October 2017	
(England) Mason Greenwood	Manchester United U18s	Wolverhampton Wanderers U18s	6–1 (H)	14 October 2017	
(Democratic Republic of the Congo) Manasse Mampala	Everton U18s	Sunderland U18s	1–5 (A)	14 October 2017	
(England) Rayhaan Tulloch	West Bromwich Albion U18s	Sunderland U18s	3–5 (H)	18 November 2017	
(Sweden) Benjamin Mbunga-Kimpioka	Sunderland U18s	West Bromwich Albion U18s	3–5 (A)	18 November 2017	
(England) Charlie Brown	Chelsea U18s	West Ham United U18s	7–0 (H)	25 November 2017	
(England) Conor Gallagher	Chelsea U18s	Tottenham Hotspur U18s	4–4 (A)	9 December 2017	
(Portugal) Rafael Camacho	Liverpool U18s	Blackburn Rovers U18s	1–6 (A)	6 January 2018	
(Scotland) Phoenix Patterson	Tottenham Hotspur U18s	Brighton & Hove Albion U18s	3–6 (A)	20 January 2018	
(Portugal) Fábio Carvalho	Fulham U18s	Reading U18s	4–0 (H)	3 February 2018	
(England) Reo Griffiths	Tottenham Hotspur U18s	Reading U18s	4–0 (H)	24 February 2018	
(Nigeria) Korede Adedoyin	Everton U18s	Newcastle United U18s	7–0 (H)	17 March 2018	
(Iceland) Stefan Ljubicic	Brighton & Hove Albion U18s	Aston Villa U18s	1–4 (A)	7 April 2018	
(England) Keyendrah Simmonds	Manchester City U18s	Everton U18s	6–1 (H)	7 April 2018	
(Germany) Felix Nmecha	Manchester City U18s	Blackburn Rovers U18s	0–5 (A)	10 April 2018	
(England) Reo Griffiths	Tottenham Hotspur U18s	Norwich City U18s	5–3 (A)	11 April 2018	
(Republic of Ireland) Adam Idah	Norwich City U18s	Tottenham Hotspur U18s	5–3 (H)	11 April 2018	
(England) Morgan Whittaker	Derby County U18s	Newcastle United U18s	3–1 (H)	14 April 2018	
(England) Rayhaan Tulloch	West Bromwich Albion U18s	Blackburn Rovers U18s	1–4 (A)	21 April 2018	
(England) Reo Griffiths^{4}	Tottenham Hotspur U18s	Arsenal U18s	9–0 (H)	24 April 2018	

Note

(H) – Home; (A) – Away
^{4} – player scored 4 goals

== Professional Development League 2 ==
U18 Professional Development League 2
- Season: 2017–18
- Champions: Charlton Athletic U18s (3rd Title)
- Matches: 313 (310 RS, 3 PO)
- Goals: 1,277 (4.08 per match) (1,269 RS, 8 PO)
- Top goalscorer: (Wales) Sion Spence Cardiff City U18s (21 Goals)
- Biggest home win: Sheffield Wednesday U18s 8–0 Hull City U18s (6 January 2019); Cardiff City U18s 8–0 Sheffield United U18s (28 March 2018)
- Biggest away win: Huddersfield Town U18s 1–10 Sheffield Wednesday U18s (24 April 2018)
- Highest scoring: Huddersfield Town U18s 1–10 Sheffield Wednesday U18s (24 April 2018)
- Longest winning run: 8 Matches – Leeds United U18s (17 March 2018 – 21 April 2018)
- Longest unbeaten run: 11 Matches – Crystal Palace U18s (10 February 2018 – 28 April 2018)
- Longest winless run: 16 Matches – Coventry City U18s (20 December 2017 – 21 April 2018)
- Longest losing run: 10 Matches – Coventry City U18s (19 August 2017 – 4 November 2017)

The Professional Development League is the sixth campaign of post-EPPP Under-23 football's second tier, designed for those academies with Category 2 status. A total of 21 teams are split regionally into north and south divisions, with each team facing opponents in their own region twice both home and away and opponents in the other region once for a total of 30 games each in the North Division, and 29 games in the South division.

At the end of the season, the teams finishing in the top two positions of both divisions will meet in the knockout stage to determine the overall league champion. Burnley U18s were officially granted Category 2 status in the summer of 2017 and became the league's 21st team. At the end of the season, Huddersfield Town U18s would leave as they would drop from category 2 to category 4 so they could restructure their academy.

=== Tables ===
==== North Division ====
Pos	Team	Pld	W	D	L	GF	GA	GD	Pts	Qualification
1	Leeds United U18s	30	19	3	8	72	39	+33	60	Qualification for Knock-out stage
2	Bolton Wanderers U18s	30	17	7	6	84	53	+31	58	Qualification for Knock-out stage
3	Sheffield Wednesday U18s	30	16	6	8	81	42	+39	54	
4	Nottingham Forest U18s	30	15	6	9	75	54	+21	51	
5	Burnley U18s	30	14	7	9	66	60	+6	49	
6	Birmingham City U18s	30	13	7	10	72	63	+9	46	
7	Sheffield United U18s	30	11	5	14	42	62	−20	38	
8	Hull City U18s	30	11	5	14	57	78	−21	38	
9	Crewe Alexandra U18s	30	10	7	13	62	58	+4	37	
10	Huddersfield Town U18s	30	9	5	16	49	86	−37	32	
11	Barnsley U18s	30	9	4	17	46	63	−17	31	

==== South Division ====
Pos	Team	Pld	W	D	L	GF	GA	GD	Pts	Qualification
1	Crystal Palace U18s	29	17	8	4	63	29	+34	59	Qualification for Knock-out stage
2	Charlton Athletic U18s	29	17	4	8	77	55	+22	55	Qualification for Knock-out stage
3	Cardiff City U18s	29	15	3	11	65	48	+17	48	
4	Watford U18s	29	15	2	12	65	48	+17	47	
5	Millwall U18s	29	14	5	10	66	57	+9	47	
6	Queens Park Rangers U18s	29	13	2	14	65	73	−8	41	
7	Bristol City U18s	29	9	4	16	44	54	−10	31	
8	Ipswich Town U18s	29	7	6	16	42	72	−30	27	
9	Colchester United U18s	29	7	1	21	47	92	−45	22	
10	Coventry City U18s	29	3	1	25	29	82	−53	10	

=== Knock-out stage ===
Semi-finals

27 April 2018

Crystal Palace U18s	3–1	Bolton Wanderers U18s
Robertson 47'; Hungbo 84'; Boateng 90'		Fearnley 72'

Coper's Cope Road, Beckenham
28 April 2018

Leeds United U18s	0–1	Charlton Athletic U18s
		Willis 39'

Thorp Arch, Thorp Arch

Professional Development League Two Play-Off Final

4 May 2018
19:00

Charlton Athletic U18s	2–1	Crystal Palace U18s
Morgan 45+3'; Sarpong-Wiredu 70'	Report	Hungbo 72' (pen.)

The Valley, London

=== Top goalscorers ===
As of 4 May 2018

Rank	Player	Club	Goals
1	(Wales) Sion Spence	Cardiff City U18s	21
2	(England) George Alexander	Millwall U18s	18
3	(England) Jardel Francis-Adeyinka	Queens Park Rangers U18s/Charlton Athletic U18s	17
3	(England) Luca Navarro	Bolton Wanderers U18s	17
5	(Republic of Ireland) Ryan Cassidy	Ipswich Town U18s	16
5	(England) Joseph Hungbo	Crystal Palace U18s	16
7	(England) Francis Jno-Baptiste	Crystal Palace U18s	15
7	(England) Jack Concannon	Birmingham City U18s	15
7	(England) Keane Lewis-Potter	Hull City U18s	15
7	(England) Wilberforce Ocran	Barnsley U18s/Charlton Athletic U18s	15
11	(Wales) Isaak Davies	Cardiff City U18s	14
11	(Romania) Dennis Politic	Bolton Wanderers U18s	14
11	(Wales) Brennan Johnson	Nottingham Forest U18s	14
11	(England) Alex Willis	Charlton Athletic U18s	14
15	(Ghana) Antoine Semenyo	Bristol City U18s	13
16	(England) George Danaher	Huddersfield Town U18s	12
16	(Cameroon) Bobby Kamwa	Leeds United U18s	12
16	(England) Charley Kendall	Queens Park Rangers U18s	12
16	(England) Brendan Sarpong-Wiredu	Charlton Athletic U18s	12
20	(Wales) Jack Clarke	Leeds United U18s	11
20	(England) Jordan Clarke	Birmingham City U18s	11
20	(Wales) Ben Hughes	Sheffield Wednesday U18s	11
20	(Wales) Reece Miller	Watford U18s	11
24	(England) Matty Barnes	Bolton Wanderers U18s	10
24	(England) Mickel Platt	Queens Park Rangers U18s	10
24	(England) Reon Potts	Sheffield United U18s	10
24	(Bulgaria) Kun Temenuzhkov	Leeds United U18s	10
24	(England) Luke Walsh	Crewe Alexandra U18s	10

=== Hat-tricks ===
As of 4 May 2018

Player	For	Against	Result	Date	Ref.
(Republic of Ireland) Ryan Cassidy	Watford U18s	Burnley U18s	1–4 (A)	12 August 2017	
(England) Liam Shaw	Sheffield Wednesday U18s	Colchester United U18s	6–0 (H)	26 August 2017	
(England) Jardel Francis-Adeyinka	Queens Park Rangers U18s	Crewe Alexandra U18s	2–3 (A)	26 August 2017	
(England) Luke Walsh	Crewe Alexandra U18s	Coventry City U18s	6–0 (H)	9 September 2017	
(Ghana) Samuel Amissah	Leeds United U18s	Millwall U18s	6–0 (H)	9 September 2017	
(Romania) Dennis Politic	Bolton Wanderers U18s	Charlton Athletic U18s	3–1 (H)	9 September 2017	
(England) Jordan Cropper	Burnley U18s	Sheffield Wednesday U18s	3–1 (H)	23 September 2017	
(Wales) Isaak Davies	Cardiff City U18s	Queens Park Rangers U18s	6–2 (H)	30 September 2017	
(England) Keane Lewis-Potter	Hull City U18s	Nottingham Forest U18s	6–3 (H)	30 September 2017	
(Romania) Dennis Politic	Bolton Wanderers U18s	Birmingham City U18s	4–4 (H)	30 September 2017	
(Ghana) Antoine Semenyo	Bristol City U18s	Ipswich Town U18s	1–5 (A)	30 September 2017	
(England) Oliver Greaves	Sheffield United U18s	Huddersfield Town U18s	1–5 (A)	30 September 2017	
(England) Jack Clarke	Leeds United U18s	Sheffield Wednesday U18s	5–2 (H)	7 October 2017	
(Wales) Sion Spence	Cardiff City U18s	Ipswich Town U18s	0–3 (A)	14 October 2017	
(England) Lucas Sinclair	Millwall U18s	Crystal Palace U18s	3–2 (H)	21 October 2017	
(Wales) Sion Spence	Cardiff City U18s	Millwall U18s	4–3 (A)	25 November 2017	
(England) George Danaher	Huddersfield Town U18s	Crewe Alexandra U18s	3–2 (H)	2 December 2017	
(England) Eddie Brown	Bolton Wanderers U18s	Barnsley U18s	3–1 (H)	6 December 2017	
(England) Matt Neary	Millwall U18s	Watford U18s	5–0 (H)	20 January 2018	
(England) Charley Kendall	Queens Park Rangers U18s	Bristol City U18s	3–1 (H)	20 January 2018	
(England) Kareem Isiaka	Charlton Athletic U18s	Queens Park Rangers U18s	3–1 (H)	27 January 2018	
(Wales) Matty Barnes	Bolton Wanderers U18s	Huddersfield Town U18s	6–1 (H)	3 February 2018	
(England) Mickel Platt	Queens Park Rangers U18s	Millwall U18s	4–5 (A)	3 February 2018	
(England) Ahmed Salam	Hull City U18s	Huddersfield Town U18s	1–6 (A)	17 February 2018	
(England) Francis Jno-Baptiste	Crystal Palace U18s	Watford U18s	0–3 (A)	24 February 2018	
(England) Reece Miller	Watford U18s	Nottingham Forest U18s	6–0 (H)	17 March 2018	
(England) Jack Concannon	Birmingham City U18s	Colchester United U18s	6–2 (H)	24 March 2018	
(Wales) Isaak Davies	Cardiff City U18s	Sheffield United U18s	8–0 (H)	28 March 2018	
(Ghana) Keith Asare	Nottingham Forest U18s	Hull City U18s	6–0 (H)	3 April 2018	
(England) Michael Fowler	Burnley U18s	Hull City U18s	4–1 (H)	10 April 2018	
(England) Charley Kendall	Queens Park Rangers U18s	Cardiff City U18s	5–1 (H)	24 April 2018	

Note

(H) – Home; (A) – Away

== League 3 ==
Football League Youth Alliance
- Season: 2017–18
- Champions: North-East Division; Mansfield Town U18s; North-West Division; Rochdale U18s; South-East Division; Milton Keynes Dons U18s; South-West Division; Exeter City U18s; Merit League One; Gillingham U18s; Merit League Two; Leyton Orient U18s
- Matches: 701
- Goals: 2,444 (3.49 per match)

League 3 is run by the Football League under the auspices of the Football League Youth Alliance. 50 teams once again competed this season, however the makeup was different. Burnley U18s would be promoted to Category 2 Academy status before this season to join the U18 Professional Development League 2. Forest Green Rovers U18s would join this season as a category 4 academy in the South-East Division, before promoting to a Category 3 Academy the next season.

=== League stage ===
==== North-East Division ====
Pos	Team	Pld	W	D	L	GF	GA	GD	Pts
1	Mansfield Town U18s (C)	24	16	7	1	55	16	+39	55
2	Chesterfield U18s	24	13	2	9	52	42	+10	41
3	Rotherham United U18s	24	11	8	5	35	27	+8	41
4	Notts County U18s	24	12	4	8	53	34	+19	40
5	Grimsby Town U18s	24	13	1	10	46	29	+17	40
6	Doncaster Rovers U18s	24	11	6	7	41	31	+10	39
7	Oldham Athletic U18s	24	12	3	9	32	40	−8	39
8	Burton Albion U18s	24	9	3	12	27	33	−6	30
9	Lincoln City U18s	24	9	2	13	37	50	−13	29
10	Bradford City U18s	24	8	3	13	29	41	−12	27
11	Scunthorpe United U18s	24	6	7	11	26	43	−17	25
12	York City U18s	24	6	4	14	25	49	−24	22
13	Hartlepool United U18s	24	2	6	16	28	51	−23	12

Source: soccerway.com
(C) Champions

==== North-West Division ====
Pos	Team	Pld	W	D	L	GF	GA	GD	Pts
1	Rochdale U18s (C)	26	21	3	2	64	19	+45	66
2	Wigan Athletic U18s	26	21	2	3	70	21	+49	65
3	Bury U18s	26	13	2	11	49	45	+4	41
4	Tranmere Rovers U18s	26	10	10	6	32	37	−5	40
5	Blackpool U18s	26	10	6	10	62	54	+8	36
6	Shrewsbury Town U18s	26	10	6	10	43	43	0	36
7	Walsall U18s	26	11	2	13	43	35	+8	35
8	Preston North End U18s	26	10	5	11	53	46	+7	35
9	Carlisle United U18s	26	9	4	13	40	49	−9	31
10	Fleetwood Town U18s	26	8	6	12	26	43	−17	30
11	Port Vale U18s	26	8	4	14	41	62	−21	28
12	Wrexham U18s	26	7	6	13	35	39	−4	27
13	Accrington Stanley U18s	26	6	7	13	30	59	−29	25
14	Morecambe U18s	26	5	3	18	30	66	−36	18

Source: soccerway.com
(C) Champions

==== South-East Division ====
Pos	Team	Pld	W	D	L	GF	GA	GD	Pts	Qualification
1	Milton Keynes Dons U18s (C)	22	14	2	6	40	27	+13	44	Merit League One
2	Southend United U18s	22	13	1	8	44	37	+7	40	Merit League One
3	Cambridge United U18s	22	12	2	8	42	25	+17	38	Merit League One
4	Gillingham U18s	22	11	1	10	43	42	+1	34	Merit League One
5	Stevenage U18s	22	8	6	8	37	34	+3	30	Merit League One
6	Luton Town U18s	22	9	3	10	30	28	+2	30	Merit League One
7	AFC Wimbledon U18s	22	9	3	10	35	37	−2	30	Merit League Two
8	Dagenham & Redbridge U18s	22	9	3	10	32	39	−7	30	Merit League Two
9	Northampton Town U18s	22	8	5	9	32	35	−3	29	Merit League Two
10	Leyton Orient U18s	22	7	4	11	33	39	−6	25	Merit League Two
11	Barnet U18s	22	8	1	13	33	46	−13	25	Merit League Two
12	Peterborough United U18s	22	7	3	12	33	45	−12	24	Merit League Two

Source: soccerway.com
(C) Champions

==== South-West Division ====
Pos	Team	Pld	W	D	L	GF	GA	GD	Pts	Qualification
1	Exeter City U18s (C)	20	15	3	2	69	19	+50	48	Merit League One
2	AFC Bournemouth U18s	20	12	5	3	50	21	+29	41	Merit League One
3	Swindon Town U18s	20	11	3	6	44	35	+9	36	Merit League One
4	Portsmouth U18s	20	10	4	6	53	36	+17	34	Merit League One
5	Oxford United U18s	20	10	4	6	40	31	+9	34	Merit League One
6	Bristol Rovers U18s	20	9	2	9	38	40	−2	29	Merit League One
7	Plymouth Argyle U18s	20	8	2	10	36	41	−5	26	Merit League Two
8	Yeovil Town U18s	20	7	3	10	30	35	−5	24	Merit League Two
9	Newport County U18s	20	4	5	11	29	50	−21	17	Merit League Two
10	Forest Green Rovers U18s	20	3	3	14	20	62	−42	12	Merit League Two
11	Cheltenham Town U18s	20	2	4	14	32	71	−39	10	Merit League Two

Source: soccerway.com
(C) Champions

=== Merit League Stage ===
The teams in the Southeast and Southwest Divisions played another ten games to determine the champions of Merit League One and Merit League Two.

==== Merit League One ====
Pos	Team	Pld	W	D	L	GF	GA	GD	Pts
1	Gillingham U18s (C)	11	7	3	1	25	15	+10	24
2	Exeter City U18s	11	7	2	2	34	10	+24	23
3	Luton Town U18s	11	6	1	4	28	17	+11	19
4	AFC Bournemouth U18s	11	5	4	2	25	21	+4	19
5	Southend United U18s	11	5	3	3	22	22	0	18
6	Swindon Town U18s	11	5	2	4	22	25	−3	17
7	Milton Keynes Dons U18s	11	5	1	5	21	23	−2	16
8	Stevenage U18s	11	3	3	5	21	22	−1	12
9	Portsmouth U18s	11	3	3	5	21	27	−6	12
10	Bristol Rovers U18s	11	3	1	7	18	26	−8	10
11	Cambridge United U18s	11	3	0	8	15	29	−14	9
12	Oxford United U18s	11	1	3	7	10	25	−15	6

Source: soccerway.com
(C) Champions

==== Merit League Two ====
Pos	Team	Pld	W	D	L	GF	GA	GD	Pts
1	Leyton Orient U18s (C)	10	7	0	3	21	12	+9	21
2	Dagenham & Redbridge U18s	10	6	2	2	25	14	+11	20
3	Northampton Town U18s	10	6	2	2	21	13	+8	20
4	Plymouth Argyle U18s	10	5	1	4	19	11	+8	16
5	Yeovil Town U18s	10	4	3	3	17	10	+7	15
6	Peterborough United U18s	10	5	0	5	16	16	0	15
7	AFC Wimbledon U18s	10	4	2	4	20	19	+1	14
8	Cheltenham Town U18s	10	4	1	5	23	32	−9	13
9	Barnet U18s	10	3	2	5	16	18	−2	11
10	Newport County U18s	10	1	3	6	14	27	−13	6
11	Forest Green Rovers U18s	10	2	0	8	11	31	−20	6

Source: soccerway.com
(C) Champions

== See also ==
- 2017–18 in English football
