= Nic Bollado =

English footballer (born 2004)

Personal information
- Full name: Nicolas Bollado
- Date of birth: 18 October 2004 (age 22)
- Position: Forward

Team information
- Current team: Morpeth Town

Youth career
- Carlisle United

Senior career*
Years	Team	Apps	(Gls)
2022–2023	Carlisle United	1	(0)
2023	Stockport County B	4	(6)
2023	→ FC United of Manchester (loan)	13	(6)
2023–	Morpeth Town	10	(5)
- * Club domestic league appearances and goals as of 13:53, 6 December 2023 (UTC)

Nicolas Bollado (born 18 October 2004) is an English professional footballer who plays as a forward for Northern Premier League Division One East club Morpeth Town.

== Career ==
Bollado was a youth-team player at Carlisle United when he impressed manager Paul Simpson during pre-season training in July 2022. He made his debut in the EFL Trophy on 20 September 2022, coming on as a 39th-minute substitute for Omari Patrick in a 1–1 draw with Fleetwood Town at Brunton Park.

Following his release from Carlisle United, he joined Stockport County ahead of the 2023–24 season. Having spent time on loan with FC United of Manchester, Bollado joined Morpeth Town in December 2023 following his release.

== Career statistics ==
As of match played 5 November 2022

Appearances and goals by club, season and competition
Club	Season	League			FA Cup		EFL Cup		Other		Total	
Club	Season	Division	Apps	Goals	Apps	Goals	Apps	Goals	Apps	Goals	Apps	Goals
Carlisle United	2022–23	EFL League Two	1	0	1	0	0	0	2 (Note: Appearance/s in the EFL Trophy)	0	4	0
Career total			1	0	1	0	0	0	2	0	4	0
