= Josh Dixon =

English footballer (born 2001)

Personal information
- Full name: Joshua James Dixon
- Date of birth: 7 February 2001 (age 25)
- Place of birth: Carlisle, England
- Height: 5 ft 11 in (1.81 m)
- Position: Midfielder

Team information
- Current team: Annan Athletic
- Number: 4

Youth career
- –2020: Carlisle United

Senior career*
Years	Team	Apps	(Gls)
2020–2023	Carlisle United	2	(0)
2022	→ Workington (loan)	2	(0)
2023–	Annan Athletic	69	(6)
- * Club domestic league appearances and goals as of 09:50, 5 September 2026 (UTC)

Joshua James Dixon (born 7 February 2001) is an English professional footballer who plays as a midfielder for Annan Athletic.

== Career ==
=== Carlisle United ===
Born in Carlisle, Dixon joined Carlisle United's youth academy at the age of 9. He started a two-year scholarship with the club in summer 2017, but suffered an anterior cruciate ligament injury shortly before the 2018–19 season, which ruled him out for most of the season. He was offered his first professional contract in April 2019, which was one year in length and signed the following month. In July 2019, his contract was extended by a year, lasting until summer 2021, though he suffered another anterior cruciate ligament injury later that month.

Dixon returned to first team training in summer 2020 and made his debut for Carlisle United as a first-half substitute in a 3–1 win over Aston Villa U21 on 17 November 2020 in the EFL Trophy.

On 25 January 2022, Dixon joined Northern Premier League Division One West side Workington on a one-month loan deal.

=== Annan Athletic ===
Dixon was released by Carlisle at the end of the 2022–23 season and then signed for Scottish club Annan Athletic. He suffered injury problems in his first season with the club, but extended his contract with the club for a further year in summer 2024. He became a regular starter for the club during the 2024–25 season, and extended his contract with the club in March 2025.

He again extended his contract with the club in April 2026.

== Career statistics ==
As of match played 1 August 2026

Appearances and goals by club, season and competition
Club	Season	League			National cup (Note: Includes FA Cup, Scottish Cup)		League cup (Note: Includes Scottish League Cup, EFL Cup)		Other		Total	
Club	Season	Division	Apps	Goals	Apps	Goals	Apps	Goals	Apps	Goals	Apps	Goals
Carlisle United	2020–21	League Two	2	0	1	0	0	0	1 (Note: Appearance(s) in EFL Trophy)	0	4	0
Carlisle United	2021–22	League Two	0	0	0	0	1	0	1	0	2	0
Carlisle United	2022–23	League Two	0	0	0	0	0	0	0	0	0	0
Carlisle United	Total		2	0	1	0	1	0	2	0	6	0
Annan Athletic	2023–24	Scottish League One	11	0	1	0	3	0	2 (Note: Appearance(s) in Scottish Challenge Cup)	0	17	0
Annan Athletic	2024–25	Scottish League One	29	1	1	0	4	1	5 (Note: 2 appearances and 1 goal in Scottish Challenge Cup, 3 appearances in Scottish League One play-offs)	1	39	3
Annan Athletic	2025–26	Scottish League Two	28	5	3	0	2	0	2	2	35	7
Annan Athletic	2026–27	Scottish League Two	1	0	0	0	3	0	0	0	4	0
Annan Athletic	Total		69	6	5	0	12	1	9	3	95	10
Career total			71	6	6	0	13	1	11	3	101	10
