= Sonny Hilton =

English footballer (born 2001)

Personal information
- Date of birth: 30 January 2001 (age 25)
- Place of birth: Liverpool, England
- Height: 1.66 m (5 ft 5 in)
- Position: Midfielder

Team information
- Current team: Matlock Town

Youth career
- Tranmere Rovers
- 2016–2020: Fulham

Senior career*
Years	Team	Apps	(Gls)
2020–2023	Fulham	0	(0)
2021	→ TPS (loan)	11	(1)
2022	→ Carlisle United (loan)	7	(0)
2023–2024	Bootle	28	(2)
2024–2026	Southport	38	(3)
2026	Marine		
2026–	Matlock Town		

International career
2019	England U19	4	(0)
- * Club domestic league appearances and goals as of 22:50, 30 October 2026 (UTC)

Sonny Hilton (born 30 January 2001) is an English semi-professional footballer who plays as a midfielder for Northern Premier League Division One East side Matlock Town.

== Club career ==
Born in Liverpool, Hilton began his career with Tranmere Rovers and Fulham, before spending time on loan with Finnish club TPS in 2021. In June 2022 he moved on loan to Carlisle United.

He was released by Fulham at the end of the 2022–23 season. He signed for Bootle in October 2023.

On 4 July 2024, Hilton signed for National League North club Southport.

Following his release from Southport at the end of the 2025–26 season, in June 2026 Hilton signed for National League North club Marine. He moved on to Northern Premier League Division One East side Matlock Town on 30 October 2026.

== International career ==
Hilton played for England at under-19 level.

== Personal life ==
Hilton also competes in taekwondo, and finished fourth in the World Championships as a child.

== Career statistics ==
As of 29 December 2022

Appearances and goals by club, season and competition
Club	Season	League			National cup		League cup		Other		Total	
Club	Season	Division	Apps	Goals	Apps	Goals	Apps	Goals	Apps	Goals	Apps	Goals
Fulham U23	2019–20	—	—		—		—		3 (Note: Appearance(s) in the EFL Trophy)	0	3	0
Fulham	2020–21	Premier League	0	0	0	0	0	0	0	0	0	0
Fulham	2021–22	Championship	0	0	0	0	0	0	0	0	0	0
Fulham	2022–23	Premier League	0	0	0	0	0	0	0	0	0	0
Fulham	Total		0	0	0	0	0	0	0	0	0	0
TPS (loan)	2021	Ykkönen	11	1	0	0	0	0	0	0	11	1
Carlisle United (loan)	2022–23	League Two	7	0	0	0	1	0	2	0	10	0
Career total			18	1	0	0	1	0	5	0	24	1
