= Manasse Mampala =

Congolese footballer

Personal information
- Date of birth: 18 July 2000 (age 26)
- Place of birth: Kinshasa, Democratic Republic of the Congo
- Height: 1.89 m (6 ft 2 in)
- Position: Forward

Team information
- Current team: Matlock Town

Youth career
- 2015–2020: Everton
- 2020–2021: Queens Park Rangers

Senior career*
| Years | Team | Apps | (Gls) |
| 2021–2022 | Carlisle United | 8 | (0) |
| 2022 | → Weymouth (loan) | 12 | (0) |
| 2022–2023 | Hyde United | 29 | (8) |
| 2023–2024 | Marine | 23 | (3) |
| 2024 | → Hyde United (loan) | 12 | (2) |
| 2024–2025 | Farsley Celtic | 33 | (1) |
| 2024 | → Matlock Town (loan) | 2 | (0) |
| 2025–2026 | Emley | | |
| 2026 | Ashton United | | |
| 2026– | Matlock Town | | |
- * Club domestic league appearances and goals as of 19:39, 10 December 2024 (UTC)

Manasse Mampala (born 18 July 2000) is a Congolese Professional footballer who plays as a forward for Northern Premier League Division One East club Matlock Town. He turned professional at Everton in 2018 and spent the 2020–21 season with Queens Park Rangers, without making a first-team appearance for either club.

== Early life ==
Manasse Mampala was born on 18 July 2000 in Kinshasa, Democratic Republic of the Congo, and moved to England at the age of two.

Manasse lived in Leeds, England for several years, attending Cockburn School.

== Playing career ==
=== Early career ===
Mampala joined the Academy at Everton at the age of 15 and went on to score 11 goals and pick up six assists during 18 appearances for the under-18s during the 2017–18 Professional Development League season. He turned professional at Goodison Park in July 2018 and signed another one-year contract in summer 2019. He played four EFL Trophy games, however he was released in June 2020 after failing to establish himself in the under-23 team. He joined Queens Park Rangers in October 2019 and was placed in the club's Under-23 team.

=== Carlisle United ===
On 23 July 2021, Mampala signed a one-year contract with EFL League Two club Carlisle United following a spell on trial where he impressed manager Chris Beech by scoring two goals in pre-season friendlies. He made his debut in the English Football League on the opening day of the 2021–22 season, coming on as a 78th-minute substitute for Jon Mellish in a 0–0 draw with Colchester United at Brunton Park on 7 August 2021. He was released by the club at the end of the 2021–22 season.

=== Non-League ===
In October 2022, Mampala signed for Northern Premier League Premier Division side Hyde United.

In July 2023, Mampala joined Marine. He returned to Hyde United on a one-month loan in January 2024. With the loan having been extended until the end of the season, he was recalled on 22 April 2024.

In June 2024, Mampala joined National League North side Farsley Celtic. In December 2024, he joined Matlock Town on a one-month loan deal. After time playing for Emley and Ashton United, Mampala, joined Matlock Town on a permanent deal in August 2026.

== Statistics ==
As of match played 15 May 2022

| Club | Season | League | | | FA Cup | | EFL Cup | | Other | | Total | |
| Club | Season | Division | Apps | Goals | Apps | Goals | Apps | Goals | Apps | Goals | Apps | Goals |
|---|---|---|---|---|---|---|---|---|---|---|---|---|
| Everton U21 | 2018–19 | – | 0 | 0 | 0 | 0 | 0 | 0 | 2 (Note: Appearance/s in the EFL Trophy.) | 0 | 2 | 0 |
| Everton U21 | 2019–20 | – | 0 | 0 | 0 | 0 | 0 | 0 | 2 | 0 | 2 | 0 |
| Everton U21 | Total | | 0 | 0 | 0 | 0 | 0 | 0 | 4 | 0 | 4 | 0 |
| Queens Park Rangers | 2020–21 | EFL Championship | 0 | 0 | 0 | 0 | 0 | 0 | 0 | 0 | 0 | 0 |
| Carlisle United | 2021–22 | EFL League Two | 8 | 0 | 1 | 0 | 1 | 0 | 5 | 1 | 15 | 1 |
| Weymouth (loan) | 2021–22 | National League | 12 | 0 | 0 | 0 | 0 | 0 | 0 | 0 | 12 | 0 |
| Career total | | | 20 | 0 | 1 | 0 | 1 | 0 | 9 | 1 | 31 | 1 |
