= Corey Whelan =

Irish footballer

Personal information
- Full name: Corey Whelan
- Date of birth: 10 December 1997 (age 28)
- Place of birth: Chester, England
- Height: 1.83 m (6 ft 0 in)
- Positions: Defender; midfielder

Team information
- Current team: AFC Fylde
- Number: 17

Youth career
- –2007: Crewe Alexandra
- 2007–2016: Liverpool

Senior career*
Years	Team	Apps	(Gls)
2016–2019	Liverpool	0	(0)
2018	→ Yeovil Town (loan)	16	(1)
2018–2019	→ Crewe Alexandra (loan)	22	(1)
2019–2021	Phoenix Rising	51	(0)
2019	→ FC Tucson (loan)	1	(1)
2021	Wigan Athletic	10	(0)
2021–2024	Carlisle United	63	(2)
2024–	AFC Fylde	45	(2)

International career^{‡}
2013–2014	Republic of Ireland U17	3	(0)
2017–2018	Republic of Ireland U21	10	(4)
- * Club domestic league appearances and goals as of 10:06, 5 Aug 2024 (UTC) ‡ National team caps and goals as of 21:50, 27 March 2018 (UTC)

Corey Whelan (born 10 December 1997) is a professional footballer who plays as a defender for National League club AFC Fylde. Born in England, he has represented the Republic of Ireland at youth level.

== Club career ==
=== Liverpool ===
Whelan began his youth career at Crewe Alexandra when he was signed by Liverpool F.C aged 9 in 2007. He made his Liverpool under-18 debut against Manchester United, with the team winning 4–0. He then became a regular starter of the club's under-23 team and team captain. He signed a new contract with the club in December 2017.

==== Loans to Yeovil Town and Crewe Alexandra ====
On 5 January 2018, Whelan joined League Two club Yeovil Town on loan until the end of the season. He made his debut for Yeovil against Bradford City in the FA Cup third round, on 6 January 2018. He scored his first senior goal against Fleetwood Town in the EFL Trophy on 6 February 2018.

On 31 August 2018, he joined Crewe on loan until January 2019. After under-21s international call-ups, he made his Crewe debut playing at right-back in a 0–0 draw at Cheltenham Town on 15 September 2018. He scored his first goal for Crewe at Gresty Road in a 2–0 win over Grimsby Town on 27 October 2018.

He was released by Liverpool at the end of the 2018–19 season.

=== Phoenix Rising ===
On 15 July 2019, Whelan joined USL Championship side Phoenix Rising FC.

=== Wigan Athletic ===
On 22 January 2021, Whelan joined League One side Wigan Athletic on a permanent deal until the end of the 2020–21 season. He made 10 appearances at his time at Wigan, helping the club avoid the drop to league 2, despite being in administration .

=== Carlisle United ===
On 23 June 2021, Whelan agreed to join Carlisle United on two-year deal following the expiry of his contract at Wigan.

Following the conclusion of the 2023–24 season, the club announced that Whelan would depart the club upon the expiration of his contract.

=== AFC Fylde ===
On 13 June 2024, Whelan agreed to join National League side AFC Fylde on a two-year contract with the option for a further season. He was named team captain the same summer, and in April 2026 captained the team to promotion as 2025–26 National League North champions.

== International career ==
Having previously played for Ireland at youth level, he received his first Republic of Ireland under-21 cap in a match against Kosovo on 25 March 2017.

== Career statistics ==
As of match played 28 May 2023

Appearances and goals by club, season and competition
Club	Season	League			National Cup		League Cup		Other		Total	
Club	Season	Division	Apps	Goals	Apps	Goals	Apps	Goals	Apps	Goals	Apps	Goals
Liverpool	2017–18	Premier League	0	0	0	0	0	0	0	0	0	0
Liverpool	2018–19	Premier League	0	0	0	0	0	0	0	0	0	0
Liverpool	Total		0	0	0	0	0	0	0	0	0	0
Yeovil Town (loan)	2017–18	League Two	16	0	1	0	0	0	3 (Note: Appearances in EFL Trophy)	1	11	1
Crewe Alexandra (loan)	2018–19	League Two	22	1	0	0	0	0	2	0	18	1
Phoenix Rising	2019	USL Championship	10	0	0	0	—		2 (Note: Appearances in USL Championship play-offs)	0	9	0
Phoenix Rising	2020	USL Championship	41	0	0	0	—		3	0	18	0
Phoenix Rising	Total		51	0	0	0	—		5	0	27	0
Wigan Athletic	2020–21	League One	10	0	0	0	0	0	0	0	7	0
Carlisle United	2021–22	League Two	35	0	2	0	0	0	4	0	41	0
Carlisle United	2022–23	League Two	25	2	1	0	1	0	6 (Note: 3 Appearances in EFL Trophy and 3 Appearances in the play-offs)	0	33	2
Carlisle United	2023–24	League One	3	0	1	0	0	0	3	0	7	0
Total			63	2	4	0	1	0	13	0	81	2
AFC Fylde	2024–25	National League	45	2	0	0	0	0	0	0	45	2
Career total			159	3	4	0	1	0	20	1	184	4

== Honours ==
Carlisle United

- EFL League Two play-offs: 2023

AFC Fylde

- National League North: 2025–26
