= Morgan Feeney =

English footballer (born 1999)

Personal information
- Full name: Morgan Feeney
- Date of birth: 8 February 1999 (age 27)
- Place of birth: Bootle, England
- Height: 6 ft 3 in (1.90 m)
- Position: Defender

Team information
- Current team: Carlisle United
- Number: 5

Youth career
- 2014–2017: Everton

Senior career*
Years	Team	Apps	(Gls)
2017–2020	Everton	0	(0)
2020	→ Tranmere Rovers (loan)	1	(0)
2020–2021	Sunderland	0	(0)
2021–2023	Carlisle United	67	(4)
2023–2025	Shrewsbury Town	74	(1)
2025–	Carlisle United	38	(4)

International career^{‡}
2016	England U17	4	(0)
2016–2017	England U18	8	(2)
2017	England U19	2	(0)
- * Club domestic league appearances and goals as of 13:34, 7 June 2026 (UTC) ‡ National team caps and goals as of 18:20, 30 November 2017 (UTC)

Morgan Feeney (born 8 February 1999) is an English professional footballer who plays as a defender for National League club Carlisle United.

== Career ==
Feeney was born in Bootle, Cumbria on 8 February 1999, and grew up in nearby Workington. He attended St Joseph's Catholic High School, where he played both rugby league and football from a young age. Feeney also played rugby league for Workington Town in their youth set-up.

In 2014, Feeney was spotted by a scout for Everton whilst playing football at a secondary school tournament. He gave up rugby to move to Merseyside with his family and focus on a career in football.

After moving to Liverpool, Feeney made his senior debut at the age of 18 in a UEFA Europa League match against Atalanta in November 2017. On 31 January 2020, Feeney joined League One side Tranmere Rovers on loan until the end of the season. He made just one appearance for Tranmere, having picked up a hamstring injury on his debut.

After leaving Everton, Feeney signed for League One club Sunderland on a short-term deal on 21 August 2020. On 8 September 2020, he scored on his debut for Sunderland in an EFL Trophy tie against Aston Villa U21s. His contract, due to expire in January 2021, will not be renewed. Sunderland manager Lee Johnson explained this with financial uncertainty arising from the coronavirus pandemic.

On 20 January 2021, Feeney returned home to his home county of Cumbria, joining League Two side Carlisle United on a short-term contract until the end of the 2020–21 season.

The following season, Feeney captained Carlisle to 5th-place finish, securing a play-off spot. In the play-off semi-final, Carlisle defeated Bradford City to win the tie 3–2 on aggregate. In the play-off final, the Cumbrians defeated Stockport County on penalties after a 1–1 draw to earn promotion back to League One after nine years in League Two.

On 28 June 2023, Feeney signed for League One side Shrewsbury Town on a 2-year contract until the end of the 2024–2025 season.

On 7 May 2025, Shrewsbury announced the player would be leaving the club in June when his contract expired.

On 17 June 2025, Feeney returned to his native Cumbria, leaving the Football League to rejoin National League club Carlisle United on a two-year contract following their relegation from League Two. He was named in the National League Team of the Season for the 2025–26 season having helped the club achieve a third-placed finish, before defeat in the play-offs.

== Career statistics ==
=== Club ===
As of match played 27 April 2024

Appearances and goals by club, season and competition
Club	Season	League			FA Cup		League Cup		Other		Total	
Club	Season	Division	Apps	Goals	Apps	Goals	Apps	Goals	Apps	Goals	Apps	Goals
Everton	2017–18	Premier League	0	0	0	0	0	0	2 (Note: Appearances in UEFA Europa League)	0	2	0
Everton	2018–19	Premier League	0	0	0	0	0	0	0	0	0	0
Everton	2019–20	Premier League	0	0	0	0	0	0	0	0	0	0
Everton	Total		0	0	0	0	0	0	2	0	2	0
Everton U21	2017–18 EFL Trophy		—		—		—		2 (Note: Appearance(s) in EFL Trophy)	0	2	0
Everton U21	2018–19 EFL Trophy		—		—		—		2	0	2	0
Everton U21	2019–20 EFL Trophy		—		—		—		3	0	3	0
Everton U21	Total		0	0	0	0	0	0	7	0	7	0
Tranmere Rovers (loan)	2019–20	League One	1	0	0	0	0	0	0	0	1	0
Sunderland	2020–21	League One	0	0	0	0	0	0	1	1	1	1
Carlisle United	2020–21	League Two	0	0	0	0	0	0	0	0	0	0
Carlisle United	2021–22	League Two	35	1	1	0	1	0	5	0	42	1
Carlisle United	2022–23	League Two	32	3	1	0	0	0	2	0	35	3
Carlisle United	Total		67	4	2	0	1	0	7	0	77	4
Shrewsbury Town	2023–24	League One	38	0	0	0	1	0	0	0	4	0
Career total			105	4	2	0	2	0	17	1	92	5

== Honours ==
Everton U23s

- Premier League Cup: 2018–19

Individual

- National League Team of the Season: 2025–26
