= 2021–22 Carlisle United F.C. season =

Carlisle United
2021–22 season
- Chairman: Andrew Jenkins
- Head Coach: Chris Beech (until 10 October); Keith Millen (between 26 October–23 February); Paul Simpson (from 23 February)
- Stadium: Brunton Park
- League Two: 20th
- FA Cup: Second round
- EFL Cup: First round
- EFL Trophy: Third round
- Top goalscorer: League: Omari Patrick (9); All: Omari Patrick (9)
- Highest home attendance: 8,514 vs Northampton Town, 12 March 2022
- Lowest home attendance: 875 vs Everton U21s, 28 September 2021
| Home colours | Away colours |

The 2021–22 season was Carlisle United's 117th season in their existence and eighth consecutive season in League Two. Along with the league, the club also competed in the FA Cup, the EFL Cup and the EFL Trophy. The season covers the period from 1 July 2021 to 30 June 2022.

== Squad statistics ==
As of 7 May 2022

| No. | Pos | Nat | Player | Total | | League Two | | FA Cup | | League Cup | | EFL Trophy | |
| No. | Pos | Nat | Player | Apps | Goals | Apps | Goals | Apps | Goals | Apps | Goals | Apps | Goals |
|---|---|---|---|---|---|---|---|---|---|---|---|---|---|
| 1 | GK | (England) ENG | Magnus Norman | 10 | 0 | 10+0 | 0 | 0+0 | 0 | 0+0 | 0 | 0+0 | 0 |
| 2 | DF | (England) ENG | Kelvin Mellor | 24 | 1 | 16+5 | 0 | 1+0 | 0 | 0+0 | 0 | 2+0 | 1 |
| 2 | DF | (England) ENG | George Tanner (sold) | 6 | 0 | 5+0 | 0 | 0+0 | 0 | 1+0 | 0 | 0+0 | 0 |
| 3 | DF | (Scotland) SCO | Jack Armer | 47 | 0 | 39+2 | 0 | 2+0 | 0 | 1+0 | 0 | 3+0 | 0 |
| 4 | MF | (England) ENG | Danny Devine | 21 | 0 | 9+8 | 0 | 0+1 | 0 | 0+0 | 0 | 3+0 | 0 |
| 5 | DF | (England) ENG | Rod McDonald | 32 | 1 | 29+1 | 1 | 1+0 | 0 | 0+0 | 0 | 1+0 | 0 |
| 6 | DF | (England) ENG | Dynel Simeu | 18 | 0 | 18+0 | 0 | 0+0 | 0 | 0+0 | 0 | 0+0 | 0 |
| 6 | DF | (England) ENG | Jonathan Dinzeyi (recalled) | 3 | 0 | 1+0 | 0 | 0+0 | 0 | 0+0 | 0 | 2+0 | 0 |
| 7 | MF | (England) ENG | Joe Riley | 37 | 3 | 26+5 | 3 | 1+0 | 0 | 1+0 | 0 | 1+3 | 0 |
| 8 | MF | (England) ENG | Callum Guy (Captain) | 37 | 0 | 34+0 | 0 | 2+0 | 0 | 0+0 | 0 | 1+0 | 0 |
| 9 | FW | (England) ENG | Lewis Alessandra | 27 | 2 | 15+9 | 2 | 1+0 | 0 | 1+0 | 0 | 1+0 | 0 |
| 10 | MF | (Republic of Ireland) IRL | Jamie Devitt | 7 | 0 | 4+3 | 0 | 0+0 | 0 | 0+0 | 0 | 0+0 | 0 |
| 10 | FW | (England) ENG | Zach Clough (left) | 22 | 3 | 10+7 | 2 | 2+0 | 1 | 0+0 | 0 | 2+1 | 0 |
| 11 | MF | (England) ENG | Brennan Dickenson | 43 | 2 | 35+4 | 2 | 1+0 | 0 | 0+1 | 0 | 2+0 | 0 |
| 12 | MF | (England) ENG | Jon Mellish | 46 | 3 | 42+0 | 3 | 1+0 | 0 | 0+1 | 0 | 2+0 | 0 |
| 13 | GK | (Denmark) DEN | Lukas Jensen | 4 | 0 | 1+0 | 0 | 0+0 | 0 | 1+0 | 0 | 2+0 | 0 |
| 14 | FW | (England) ENG | Tristan Abrahams (out on loan) | 26 | 4 | 12+8 | 3 | 2+0 | 0 | 0+1 | 0 | 1+2 | 1 |
| 15 | MF | (England) ENG | Taylor Charters (out on loan) | 16 | 1 | 1+8 | 0 | 0+2 | 0 | 1+0 | 0 | 3+1 | 1 |
| 16 | DF | (England) ENG | Morgan Feeney | 41 | 1 | 31+4 | 1 | 1+0 | 0 | 1+0 | 0 | 4+0 | 0 |
| 17 | DF | (Republic of Ireland) IRL | Corey Whelan | 40 | 0 | 30+5 | 0 | 2+0 | 0 | 0+0 | 0 | 2+1 | 0 |
| 18 | MF | (England) ENG | Josh Dixon | 2 | 0 | 0+0 | 0 | 0+0 | 0 | 1+0 | 0 | 1+0 | 0 |
| 19 | FW | (England) ENG | Manasse Mampala (out on loan) | 14 | 1 | 0+8 | 0 | 0+1 | 0 | 1+0 | 0 | 2+2 | 1 |
| 20 | FW | (France) FRA | Gime Touré | 7 | 0 | 1+4 | 0 | 0+0 | 0 | 1+0 | 0 | 1+0 | 0 |
| 21 | GK | (England) ENG | Scott Simons | 0 | 0 | 0+0 | 0 | 0+0 | 0 | 0+0 | 0 | 0+0 | 0 |
| 22 | GK | (England) ENG | Gabriel Breeze | 0 | 0 | 0+0 | 0 | 0+0 | 0 | 0+0 | 0 | 0+0 | 0 |
| 23 | MF | (England) ENG | Lewis Bell | 3 | 0 | 0+1 | 0 | 0+0 | 0 | 1+0 | 0 | 1+0 | 0 |
| 24 | FW | (England) ENG | Tobi Sho-Silva | 13 | 4 | 4+9 | 4 | 0+0 | 0 | 0+0 | 0 | 0+0 | 0 |
| 25 | FW | (England) ENG | Sam Fishburn | 14 | 0 | 3+6 | 0 | 0+2 | 0 | 0+0 | 0 | 1+2 | 0 |
| 26 | DF | (England) ENG | Jack Ellis | 2 | 0 | 2+0 | 0 | 0+0 | 0 | 0+0 | 0 | 0+0 | 0 |
| 27 | MF | (England) ENG | Jordan Gibson | 43 | 7 | 33+6 | 6 | 1+1 | 1 | 0+0 | 0 | 1+1 | 0 |
| 28 | DF | (England) ENG | Mitchell Roberts | 6 | 0 | 3+3 | 0 | 0+0 | 0 | 0+0 | 0 | 0+0 | 0 |
| 29 | FW | (Belgium) BEL | Tyrese Omotoye | 13 | 0 | 7+6 | 0 | 0+0 | 0 | 0+0 | 0 | 0+0 | 0 |
| 30 | FW | (England) ENG | Omari Patrick | 24 | 9 | 22+2 | 9 | 0+0 | 0 | 0+0 | 0 | 0+0 | 0 |
| 30 | FW | (England) ENG | Brad Young (recalled) | 19 | 3 | 7+7 | 0 | 1+1 | 1 | 0+0 | 0 | 3+0 | 2 |
| 31 | FW | (England) ENG | Kristian Dennis | 17 | 2 | 12+5 | 2 | 0+0 | 0 | 0+0 | 0 | 0+0 | 0 |
| 32 | DF | (England) ENG | Joel Senior | 5 | 0 | 3+1 | 0 | 0+0 | 0 | 0+0 | 0 | 0+1 | 0 |
| 33 | GK | (England) ENG | Mark Howard | 39 | 0 | 35+0 | 0 | 2+0 | 0 | 0+0 | 0 | 2+0 | 0 |
| 37 | FW | (England) ENG | Owen Windsor | 3 | 1 | 3+0 | 1 | 0+0 | 0 | 0+0 | 0 | 0+0 | 0 |

=== Top scorers ===
| Place | Position | Nation | Number | Name | League Two | FA Cup | League Cup | EFL Trophy | Total |
|---|---|---|---|---|---|---|---|---|---|
| 1 | FW | (England) | 30 | Omari Patrick | 9 | 0 | 0 | 0 | 9 |
| 2 | MF | (England) | 27 | Jordan Gibson | 6 | 1 | 0 | 1 | 8 |
| 3 | FW | (England) | 24 | Tobi Sho-Silva | 4 | 0 | 0 | 0 | 4 |
| 3 | FW | (England) | 14 | Tristan Abrahams | 3 | 0 | 0 | 1 | 4 |
| 4 | FW | (England) | 30 | Brad Young | 0 | 1 | 0 | 2 | 3 |
| 4 | FW | (England) | 10 | Zach Clough | 2 | 1 | 0 | 0 | 3 |
| 4 | MF | (England) | 12 | Jon Mellish | 3 | 0 | 0 | 0 | 3 |
| 4 | MF | (England) | 7 | Joe Riley | 3 | 0 | 0 | 0 | 3 |
| 5 | FW | (England) | 9 | Lewis Alessandra | 2 | 0 | 0 | 0 | 2 |
| 5 | FW | (England) | 31 | Kristian Dennis | 2 | 0 | 0 | 0 | 2 |
| 5 | MF | (England) | 11 | Brennan Dickenson | 2 | 0 | 0 | 0 | 2 |
| 6 | FW | (England) | 19 | Manasse Mampala | 0 | 0 | 0 | 1 | 1 |
| 6 | FW | (England) | 37 | Owen Windsor | 1 | 0 | 0 | 0 | 1 |
| 6 | MF | (England) | 15 | Taylor Charters | 0 | 0 | 0 | 1 | 1 |
| 6 | DF | (Scotland) | 3 | Jack Armer | 0 | 0 | 0 | 1 | 1 |
| 6 | DF | (England) | 2 | Kelvin Mellor | 0 | 0 | 0 | 1 | 1 |
| 6 | DF | (England) | 16 | Morgan Feeney | 1 | 0 | 0 | 0 | 1 |
| 6 | DF | (England) | 5 | Rod McDonald | 1 | 0 | 0 | 0 | 1 |
| Own goals | | | | | 0 | 0 | 0 | 0 | 0 |
| | | | | TOTALS | 39 | 3 | 0 | 8 | 50 |

=== Disciplinary record ===
| Position | Nation | Number | Name | League Two | | FA Cup | | League Cup | | EFL Trophy | | Total | |
| Position | Nation | Number | Name | Booked | Sent off (straight red) | Booked | Sent off (straight red) | Booked | Sent off (straight red) | Booked | Sent off (straight red) | Booked | Sent off (straight red) |
| MF | (England) | 12 | Jon Mellish | 8 | 1 | 0 | 0 | 0 | 0 | 1 | 0 | 9 | 1 |
| FW | (England) | 19 | Manasse Mampala | 0 | 1 | 0 | 0 | 0 | 0 | 1 | 0 | 1 | 1 |
| MF | (England) | 11 | Brennan Dickenson | 11 | 0 | 0 | 0 | 0 | 0 | 1 | 0 | 12 | 0 |
| DF | (Scotland) | 14 | Jack Armer | 10 | 0 | 0 | 0 | 1 | 0 | 0 | 0 | 11 | 0 |
| MF | (England) | 3 | Callum Guy | 8 | 0 | 0 | 0 | 0 | 0 | 1 | 0 | 9 | 0 |
| DF | (England) | 10 | Dynel Simeu | 8 | 0 | 0 | 0 | 0 | 0 | 0 | 0 | 8 | 0 |
| DF | (England) | 16 | Morgan Feeney | 5 | 0 | 1 | 0 | 0 | 0 | 0 | 0 | 6 | 0 |
| DF | (Republic of Ireland) | 12 | Corey Whelan | 4 | 0 | 1 | 0 | 0 | 0 | 0 | 0 | 5 | 0 |
| FW | (England) | 10 | Zach Clough | 3 | 0 | 1 | 0 | 0 | 0 | 0 | 0 | 4 | 0 |
| MF | (England) | 8 | Joe Riley | 4 | 0 | 0 | 0 | 0 | 0 | 0 | 0 | 4 | 0 |
| GK | (England) | 1 | Magnus Norman | 1 | 0 | 0 | 0 | 0 | 0 | 0 | 0 | 1 | 0 |
| MF | (France) | 20 | Gime Touré | 0 | 0 | 0 | 0 | 0 | 0 | 1 | 0 | 1 | 0 |
| DF | (Republic of Ireland) | 17 | Corey Whelan | 1 | 0 | 0 | 0 | 0 | 0 | 0 | 0 | 1 | 0 |
| | | | TOTALS | 12 | 1 | 0 | 0 | 1 | 0 | 2 | 0 | 15 | 1 |

== Pre-season friendlies ==
Carlisle United confirmed they would play friendly matches against Penrith, Workington, Hebburn Town, Chorley, Kendal Town, Blackpool, Everton U23s, Lancaster City and FC Halifax Town as part of their pre-season preparations.

| 13 July 2021 Friendly | Penrith | 0–8 | Carlisle United | Penrith |
| 19:00 BST | | Report | Abrahams 5'; Dixon 40'; Charters 44'; Clough 48', 65' (pen.), 68'; Touré 78'; Mellish 88' | Stadium: Frenchfields Stadium; Attendance: 670; Referee: Scott Henry |

| 17 July 2021 Friendly | Workington | 0–3 | Carlisle United | Workington |
| 15:00 BST | | Report | Clough 13'; Mampala 36'; Charters 65' | Stadium: Borough Park; Attendance: 748; Referee: Anthony Backhouse |

| 17 July 2021 Friendly | Hebburn Town | 0–2 | Carlisle United | Hebburn |
| 15:00 BST | | Report | Abrahams 37', 66' (pen.) | Stadium: Hebburn Sports & Social Ground; Attendance: 294; Referee: Rebecca Welch |

| 20 July 2021 Friendly | Chorley | 0–2 | Carlisle United | Chorley |
| 19:30 BST | | Report | Abrahams 12'; Clough 16' | Stadium: Victory Park; Referee: Dave McNamara |

| 21 July 2021 Friendly | Kendal Town | 0–6 | Carlisle United | Kendal |
| 19:30 BST | | Report | Mellish 23'; Feeney 33'; Dixon 38'; Mampala 61'; Fishburn 78'; Touré 83' | Stadium: Parkside Road |

| 24 July 2021 Friendly | Carlisle United | 0–1 | Blackpool | Carlisle |
| 15:00 BST | | Report | Mitchell 37' | Stadium: Brunton Park; Attendance: 1,863; Referee: Anthony Backhouse |

| 27 July 2021 Friendly | Carlisle United | 3–2 | Everton U23s | Halewood |
| 14:00 BST | Mellish 20'; Bell 83'; Mampala 84' | Report | Trailist 7', 66' | Stadium: Finch Farm; Attendance: 0 (Behind-closed-doors); Referee: Anthony Backhouse |

| 28 July 2021 Friendly | Lancaster City | Cancelled | Carlisle United | Lancaster |
| 19:45 BST | | | | Stadium: Giant Axe |
Note: Match was cancelled due to being unable to fulfil the fixture.

| 30 July 2021 Friendly | Carlisle United | 3–0 | FC Halifax Town | Carlisle |
| 19:00 BST | Clough 7'; Mampala 11'; Trialist 87' (o.g.) | Report | | Stadium: Brunton Park; Attendance: 1,076; Referee: Anthony Backhouse |

== Competitions ==
=== League Two ===
==== League table ====
| Pos | Team | Pld | W | D | L | GF | GA | GD | Pts | Promotion, qualification or relegation |
|---|---|---|---|---|---|---|---|---|---|---|
| 17 | Hartlepool United | 46 | 14 | 12 | 20 | 44 | 64 | −20 | 54 | |
| 18 | Rochdale | 46 | 12 | 17 | 17 | 51 | 59 | −8 | 53 | |
| 19 | Harrogate Town | 46 | 14 | 11 | 21 | 64 | 75 | −11 | 53 | |
| 20 | Carlisle United | 46 | 14 | 11 | 21 | 39 | 62 | −23 | 53 | |
| 21 | Stevenage | 46 | 11 | 14 | 21 | 45 | 68 | −23 | 47 | |
| 22 | Barrow | 46 | 10 | 14 | 22 | 44 | 57 | −13 | 44 | |
| 23 | Oldham Athletic (R) | 46 | 9 | 11 | 26 | 46 | 75 | −29 | 38 | Relegation to National League |

Source: EFL Official Website
Rules for classification: 1) Points; 2) Goal difference; 3) Number of goals scored; 4) Head-to-head results; 5) Wins; 6) Away goals; 7) Penalty points (sec 9.5); 8) 12-point sending off offences
(R) Relegated

==== Results summary ====
| Overall | | | | | | | | Home | | | | | | Away | | | | | |
| Pld | W | D | L | GF | GA | GD | Pts | W | D | L | GF | GA | GD | W | D | L | GF | GA | GD |
|---|---|---|---|---|---|---|---|---|---|---|---|---|---|---|---|---|---|---|---|
| 46 | 14 | 11 | 21 | 39 | 62 | −23 | 53 | 8 | 7 | 8 | 19 | 23 | −4 | 6 | 4 | 13 | 20 | 39 | −19 |

Last updated: 7 May 2022.

==== Results by matchday ====
| Matchday | 1 | 2 | 3 | 4 | 5 | 6 | 7 | 8 | 9 | 10 | 11 | 12 | 13 | 14 | 15 | 16 | 17 | 18 | 19 | 20 | 21 | 22 | 23 | 24 | 25 | 26 | 27 | 28 | 29 | 30 | 31 | 32 | 33 | 34 | 35 | 36 | 37 | 38 | 39 | 40 | 41 | 42 | 43 | 44 | 45 | 46 |
|---|---|---|---|---|---|---|---|---|---|---|---|---|---|---|---|---|---|---|---|---|---|---|---|---|---|---|---|---|---|---|---|---|---|---|---|---|---|---|---|---|---|---|---|---|---|---|
| Ground | H | A | A | H | A | H | A | H | A | H | A | H | A | H | A | H | A | H | H | A | A | A | H | H | H | A | H | A | H | A | H | A | H | A | H | H | A | H | A | A | H | A | H | A | H | A |
| Result | D | W | D | D | L | W | L | D | L | L | L | L | D | D | L | D | L | L | W | L | W | W | W | D | D | L | L | L | L | D | L | W | W | W | W | L | W | W | L | D | L | L | W | L | W | L |
| Position | 13 | 7 | 6 | 9 | 11 | 8 | 12 | 13 | 17 | 19 | 22 | 23 | 23 | 22 | 23 | 22 | 23 | 23 | 22 | 22 | 21 | 21 | 19 | 20 | 19 | 20 | 20 | 22 | 22 | 22 | 23 | 22 | 19 | 18 | 17 | 18 | 17 | 18 | 18 | 18 | 19 | 19 | 17 | 20 | 18 | 20 |

Updated to match(es) played on 7 May 2022. Source: Statto.com
A = Away; H = Home; W = Win; D = Draw; L = Loss

==== Matches ====
Carlisle's fixtures were confirmed on 24 June 2021.

| 7 August 2021 1 | Carlisle United | 0–0 | Colchester United | Carlisle |
| 15:00 BST | Mellish (yellow card) 14'; Whelan (yellow card) 58' | Report | | Stadium: Brunton Park; Attendance: 6,382; Referee: Peter Wright |

| 14 August 2021 2 | Swindon Town | 1–2 | Carlisle United | Swindon |
| 15:00 BST | Crichlow 30'; Reed (yellow card) 90+3'; Hayden (yellow card) 28' (yellow-red card) 90+7' | Report | Riley 13'; Dickenson (yellow card) 29'; Abrahams 43'; Norman (yellow card) 63' | Stadium: Energy Check County Ground; Attendance: 9,450; Referee: Carl Brook |

| 17 August 2021 3 | Port Vale | 0–0 | Carlisle United | Burslem |
| 19:45 BST | | Report | Dickenson (yellow card) 70'; Abrahams (yellow card) 77' | Stadium: Vale Park; Attendance: 4,943; Referee: Paul Howard |

| 21 August 2021 4 | Carlisle United | 1–1 | Leyton Orient | Carlisle |
| 15:00 BST | Abrahams 9' (pen.) | Report | Sweeney (yellow card) 17'; Smith (yellow card) 55', (goal) 74'; Drinan (yellow card) 61'; Kyprianou (yellow card) 65'; Clay (yellow card) 90+2' | Stadium: Brunton Park; Attendance: 4,597; Referee: Bobby Madley |

| 28 August 2021 5 | Hartlepool United | 2–1 | Carlisle United | Hartlepool |
| 15:00 BST | Burey 13'; Holohan 69'; Liddle (yellow card) 87' | Report | Clough (yellow card) 3', (goal) 38'; Guy (yellow card) 67' | Stadium: Victoria Park; Attendance: 6,112; Referee: Andy Woolmer |

| 4 September 2021 6 | Carlisle United | 2–1 | Salford City | Carlisle |
| 15:00 BST | Dickenson 8'; Mellish 60' | Report | Morris 44' | Stadium: Brunton Park; Attendance: 4,671; Referee: Martin Coy |

| 11 September 2021 7 | Crawley Town | 2–1 | Carlisle United | Crawley |
| 15:00 BST | Nichols 32'; Tsaroulla 90' | Report | Mellish 83' | Stadium: Broadfield Stadium; Attendance: 2,151; Referee: Tom Reeves |

| 18 September 2021 8 | Carlisle United | 2–2 | Scunthorpe United | Carlisle |
| 15:00 BST | Gibson 81'; Dickenson 90+5' | Report | Jarvis 3'; Onariase 44' | Stadium: Brunton Park; Attendance: 4,499; Referee: Rebecca Welch |

| 25 September 2021 9 | Sutton United | 4–0 | Carlisle United | Sutton |
| 15:00 BST | Whelan 4' (o.g.); Smith 37', 70'; Ajiboye 81' | Report | Mampala (yellow card) 56' (yellow-red card) 71' | Stadium: Gander Green Lane; Attendance: 2,873; Referee: Simon Mather |

| 2 October 2021 10 | Carlisle United | 0–2 | Forest Green Rovers | Carlisle |
| 15:00 BST | | Report | Matt 29'; Cadden 32' | Stadium: Brunton Park; Attendance: 3,963; Referee: Sam Barrott |

| 9 October 2021 11 | Bristol Rovers | 3–0 | Carlisle United | Bristol |
| 15:00 BST | Evans 35'; Nicholson 86'; Saunders 90+4' | Report | | Stadium: Memorial Stadium; Attendance: 6,302; Referee: Charles Breakspear |

| 16 October 2021 12 | Carlisle United | 0–1 | Tranmere Rovers | Carlisle |
| 15:00 BST | | Report | McDonald 48' (o.g.) | Stadium: Brunton Park; Attendance: 4,831; Referee: Andrew Kitchen |

| 19 October 2021 13 | Newport County | 2–2 | Carlisle United | Newport |
| 19:45 BST | Telford 27', 30' | Report | Riley 1'; Clough 67' (pen.) | Stadium: Rodney Parade; Attendance: 2,962; Referee: David Rock |

| 23 October 2021 14 | Carlisle United | 0–0 | Oldham Athletic | Carlisle |
| 15:00 BST | | Report | | Stadium: Brunton Park; Attendance: 4,274; Referee: Ben Speedie |

| 30 October 2021 15 | Northampton Town | 3–0 | Carlisle United | Northampton |
| 14:00 BST | Lewis 41', 57', 67' (pen.) | Report | | Stadium: Sixfields Stadium; Attendance: 4,909; Referee: Ollie Yates |

| 13 November 2021 16 | Carlisle United | 0–0 | Barrow | Carlisle |
| 13:00 GMT | | Report | | Stadium: Brunton Park; Attendance: 7,470; Referee: Martin Coy |

| 20 November 2021 17 | Exeter City | 2–1 | Carlisle United | Exeter |
| 15:00 GMT | Nombe 60'; Caprice 80' | Report | Mellish (red card) 43'; Gibson 84' | Stadium: St James Park; Attendance: 4,796; Referee: Will Finnie |

| 23 November 2021 18 | Carlisle United | 0–2 | Harrogate Town | Carlisle |
| 19:45 GMT | | Report | Thomson 45+1'; Pattison 78' | Stadium: Brunton Park; Attendance: 3,172; Referee: Seb Stocksbridge |

| 27 November 2021 19 | Carlisle United | 1–0 | Walsall | Carlisle |
| 15:00 GMT | Abrahams 88' | Report | | Stadium: Brunton Park; Attendance: 3,795; Referee: Scott Oldham |

| 7 December 2021 20 | Mansfield Town | 1–0 | Carlisle United | Mansfield |
| 19:45 GMT | McLaughlin 6' | Report | | Stadium: Field Mill; Attendance: 3,695; Referee: Neil Hair |

| 11 December 2021 21 | Stevenage | 0–2 | Carlisle United | Stevenage |
| 15:00 GMT | | Report | Mellish 45'; Gibson 65' (pen.) | Stadium: Broadhall Way; Attendance: 2,842; Referee: Declan Bourne |

| 18 December 2021 (Note: Match rescheduled due to outbreak of COVID-19 at Bradford City) 22 | Carlisle United | v | Bradford City | Carlisle |
| 15:00 GMT | | | | Stadium: Brunton Park |

| 26 December 2021 (Note: Match rescheduled due to outbreak of COVID-19 in the club) 22 | Carlisle United | v | Rochdale | Carlisle |
| 15:00 GMT | | | | Stadium: Brunton Park |

| 29 December 2021 (Note: Match rescheduled due to outbreak of COVID-19 in the club) 22 | Salford City | v | Carlisle United | Salford |
| 19:45 GMT | | | | Stadium: Moor Lane |

| 1 January 2022 22 | Scunthorpe United | 0–1 | Carlisle United | Scunthorpe |
| 15:00 GMT | Rowe (yellow card) 35'; Hackney (yellow card) 52' | Report | McDonald 40'; Dickenson (yellow card) 59' | Stadium: Sands Venue Stadium; Attendance: 3,020; Referee: Ben Toner |

| 8 January 2022 23 | Carlisle United | 2–0 | Bradford City | Carlisle |
| 15:00 GMT | Gibson 45'; Patrick 87' | Report | | Stadium: Brunton Park; Attendance: 4,996; Referee: Andy Haines |

| 15 January 2022 24 | Carlisle United | 1–1 | Crawley Town | Carlisle |
| 15:00 GMT | Whelan (yellow card) 42'; Omotoye (yellow card) 45+2'; Alessandra 90+3' | Report | Nadesan 25'; Nichols (yellow card) 41'; Payne (yellow card) 68' | Stadium: Brunton Park; Attendance: 4,350; Referee: Darren Bond |

| 18 January 2022 25 | Carlisle United | 0–0 | Hartlepool United | Carlisle |
| 19:45 GMT | Gibson (yellow card) 89' | Report | Odusina (yellow card) 51' | Stadium: Brunton Park; Attendance: 4,570; Referee: Ollie Yates |

| 22 January 2022 26 | Forest Green Rovers | 3–0 | Carlisle United | Nailsworth |
| 15:00 GMT | Feeney 16' (o.g.); Stevens 52'; Matt 77' | Report | | Stadium: The New Lawn; Attendance: 2,864; Referee: Craig Hicks |

| 29 January 2022 27 | Carlisle United | 0–2 | Sutton United | Carlisle |
| 15:00 GMT | | Report | Olaofe 23'; Ajiboye 31' | Stadium: Brunton Park; Attendance: 4,399; Referee: Darren Handley |

| 1 February 2022 28 | Salford City | 2–1 | Carlisle United | Salford |
| 19:45 GMT | Watson 52' (pen.); Smith 71' | Report | Patrick 67' | Stadium: Moor Lane; Attendance: 2,059; Referee: Simon Mather |

| 8 February 2022 29 | Carlisle United | 1–3 | Port Vale | Carlisle |
| 19:45 GMT | Windsor 21' | Report | Worrall 1'; Wilson 43'; Amoo 81' | Stadium: Brunton Park; Attendance: 3,379; Referee: Andrew Kitchen |

| 12 February 2022 30 | Colchester United | 2–2 | Carlisle United | Colchester |
| 15:00 GMT | Smith 69'; Wright 74' | Report | Patrick 51'; Sho-Silva 86' | Stadium: Colchester Community Stadium; Attendance: 2,664; Referee: Lee Swabey |

| 19 February 2022 31 | Carlisle United | 0–3 | Swindon Town | Carlisle |
| 15:00 GMT | | Report | McKirdy 17'; Davison 55'; Barry 57' | Stadium: Brunton Park; Attendance: 4,345; Referee: Oliver Langford |

| 26 February 2022 32 | Leyton Orient | 0–1 | Carlisle United | Leyton |
| 15:00 GMT | Archibald (yellow card) 48' (yellow-red card) 50' | Report | Patrick 5' | Stadium: Brisbane Road; Attendance: 5,272; Referee: Carl Boyeson |

| 1 March 2022 33 | Carlisle United | 2–0 | Rochdale | Carlisle |
| 19:45 GMT | Patrick 25'; Sho-Silva 89' | Report | | Stadium: Brunton Park; Attendance: 5,360; Referee: Marc Edwards |

| 5 March 2022 34 | Oldham Athletic | 1–2 | Carlisle United | Oldham |
| 15:00 GMT | Hope 45+4' | Report | Patrick 48'; Feeney 90+4' | Stadium: Boundary Park; Attendance: 7,327; Referee: Sam Allison |

| 12 March 2022 35 | Carlisle United | 2–1 | Northampton Town | Carlisle |
| 15:00 GMT | Sho-Silva 74'; Gibson 90+4' (pen.) | Report | Lewis 79' | Stadium: Brunton Park; Attendance: 8,514; Referee: James Bell |

| 15 March 2022 36 | Carlisle United | 1–2 | Newport County | Carlisle |
| 19:45 GMT | Patrick 80' | Report | Demetriou 15'; Azaz 65' | Stadium: Brunton Park; Attendance: 4,445; Referee: Martin Coy |

| 19 March 2022 37 | Barrow | 1–2 | Carlisle United | Barrow-in-Furness |
| 15:00 GMT | Banks 78' | Report | Gibson 32'; Dennis 75' | Stadium: Holker Street; Attendance: 4,658; Referee: Bobby Madley |

| 26 March 2022 38 | Carlisle United | 1–0 | Bristol Rovers | Carlisle |
| 15:00 GMT | Dennis 72' | Report | | Stadium: Brunton Park; Attendance: 5,884; Referee: Andy Haines |

| 29 March 2022 39 | Rochdale | 2–0 | Carlisle United | Rochdale |
| 19:45 BST | Kelly 10' (pen.); Grant 81' | Report | | Stadium: Spotland Stadium; Attendance: 2,160; Referee: James Oldham |

| 2 April 2022 40 | Tranmere Rovers | 2–2 | Carlisle United | Birkenhead |
| 15:00 BST | Hemmings 15'; Macdonald (red card) 40'; Nevitt 76'; Morris (red card) 90+1' | Report | Patrick 55'; Sho-Silva 90+7' | Stadium: Prenton Park; Attendance: 6,477; Referee: Charles Breakspear |

| 9 April 2022 41 | Carlisle United | 0–1 | Exeter City | Carlisle |
| 15:00 BST | | Report | Amond 89' | Stadium: Brunton Park; Attendance: 5,132; Referee: Tom Nield |

| 15 April 2022 42 | Walsall | 1–0 | Carlisle United | Walsall |
| 15:00 BST | Earing 45+2' | Report | | Stadium: Bescot Stadium; Attendance: 5,114; Referee: Martin Woods |

| 18 April 2022 43 | Carlisle United | 1–0 | Mansfield Town | Carlisle |
| 15:00 BST | Patrick 56' | Report | | Stadium: Brunton Park; Attendance: 5,496; Referee: Ross Joyce |

| 23 April 2022 44 | Harrogate Town | 3–0 | Carlisle United | Harrogate |
| 15:00 BST | Diamond 18', 90+1'; McArdle 27' | Report | | Stadium: Wetherby Road; Attendance: 2,707; Referee: Rebecca Welch |

| 30 April 2022 45 | Carlisle United | 2–1 | Stevenage | Carlisle |
| 15:00 BST | Riley 52'; Alessandra 63' | Report | Norris 88' (pen.) | Stadium: Brunton Park; Attendance: 5,701; Referee: Darren Drysdale |

| 7 May 2022 46 | Bradford City | 2–0 | Carlisle United | Bradford |
| 15:00 BST | Angol 13'; Walker 69' | Report | | Stadium: Valley Parade; Attendance: 18,283; Referee: James Bell |

=== FA Cup ===
Carlisle were drawn at home to Horsham in the first round and Shrewsbury Town in the second round.

| 6 November 2021 First round | Carlisle United | 2–0 | Horsham | Carlisle |
| 15:00 GMT | Young 69'; Clough 90' | Report | | Stadium: Brunton Park; Attendance: 2,581; Referee: Lewis Smith |

| 4 December 2021 Second round | Carlisle United | 1–2 | Shrewsbury Town | Carlisle |
| 15:00 GMT | Whelan (yellow card) 8'; Clough (yellow card) 30'; Feeney (yellow card) 60'; Gibson 90+1' | Report | Bloxham 10'; Pennington (yellow card) 25'; Vela (yellow card) 49'; Udoh (yellow card) 54'; Bowman 78' | Stadium: Brunton Park; Attendance: 2,794; Referee: Sam Barrott |

=== EFL Cup ===
Carlisle United were drawn away to Sheffield United in the first round.

| 10 August 2021 First round | Sheffield United | 1–0 | Carlisle United | Sheffield |
| 19:45 BST | Brewster 24'; Jebbison (yellow card) 89'; Norrington-Davies (yellow card) 90+2' | Report | Armer (yellow card) 77' | Stadium: Bramall Lane; Attendance: 6,778; Referee: James Oldham |

=== EFL Trophy ===
The Cumbrians were drawn into Northern Group A alongside Everton U21s, Hartlepool United and Morecambe. On July 6, U's group game matches were announced. In the knock-out stages, Carlisle were drawn away to Tranmere Rovers or Harrogate Town in the third round.

| Pos | Div | Team | Pld | W | PW | PL | L | GF | GA | GD | Pts | Qualification |
|---|---|---|---|---|---|---|---|---|---|---|---|---|
| 1 | L2 | Carlisle United | 3 | 2 | 1 | 0 | 0 | 7 | 3 | +4 | 8 | Advance to Round 2 |
| 2 | L2 | Hartlepool United | 3 | 1 | 1 | 1 | 0 | 6 | 5 | +1 | 6 | Advance to Round 2 |
| 3 | ACA | Everton U21 | 3 | 1 | 0 | 0 | 2 | 1 | 3 | −2 | 3 | |
| 4 | L1 | Morecambe | 3 | 0 | 0 | 1 | 2 | 2 | 5 | −3 | 1 | |

Source: EFL.com

| 31 August 2021 Group game 1 | Carlisle United | 3–3 (4–3 p) | Hartlepool United | Carlisle |
| 19:00 BST | Charters 11'; Mampala 59', (yellow card) 67'; Abrahams 78' | Report | Daly 18', (yellow card) 55'; Molyneux 81'; Olomola 89' (pen.) | Stadium: Brunton Park; Attendance: 1,360; Referee: James Bell |
| | Penalties |
| | Clough (penalty scored); Abrahams (penalty missed); Young (penalty scored); Armer (penalty scored); Charters (penalty scored) | | Burey (penalty missed); Daly (penalty scored); Olomola (penalty scored); Crawford (penalty missed); Molyneux (penalty scored) |

| 28 September 2021 Group game 2 | Carlisle United | 2–0 | Everton U21 | Carlisle |
| 19:00 BST | Young 44', 67'; Touré (yellow card) 55' | Report | | Stadium: Brunton Park; Attendance: 875; Referee: Seb Stockbridge |

| 9 November 2021 Group game 3 | Morecambe | 0–2 | Carlisle United | Morecambe |
| 19:00 GMT | Gibson (yellow card) 34' | Report | Gibson 49'; Mellor 54' | Stadium: Mazuma Stadium; Attendance: 945; Referee: Ross Joyce |

| 30 November 2021 Second round | Carlisle United | 1–1 (4–3 p) | Lincoln City | Carlisle |
| 19:00 GMT | Mellish (yellow card) 55'; Armer 69'; Guy (yellow card) 90+2' | Report | Maguire 45', (yellow card) 85'; Adelakun (yellow card) 55'; McGrandles (yellow card) 90+1' | Stadium: Brunton Park; Attendance: 884; Referee: James Bell |
| | Penalties |
| | Mellish (penalty missed); Armer (penalty scored); Whelan (penalty scored); Young (penalty scored); Charters (penalty scored) | | Maguire (penalty missed); Fiorini (penalty scored); Bishop (penalty scored); McGrandles (penalty scored); Montsma (penalty missed) |

| 4 January 2022 Third round | Harrogate Town | 1–0 | Carlisle United | Harrogate |
| 19:00 GMT | Armstrong 7'; Diarra (yellow card) 32'; Diamond (yellow card) 73' | Report | Dickenson (yellow card) 33' | Stadium: Wetherby Road; Attendance: 928; Referee: David Rock |

=== Cumberland Senior Cup ===
Carlisle were drawn against Langwathby United in the first round.

| 21 September 2021 First round | Langwathby United | 0–7 | Carlisle United (Note: Carlisle United fielded their Under-18 side for the fixture) | Penrith |
| 19:00 BST | | Report | Watt 21', 36', 63', 67'; Hill 41', 81' (pen.); Taylor 49' | Stadium: Frenchfield Park; Attendance: 276; Referee: Scott Henry |

== Transfers ==
=== Transfers in ===
| Date | Position | Nationality | Name | From | Fee | Ref. |
|---|---|---|---|---|---|---|
| 1 July 2021 | CF | (England) | Tristan Abrahams | (Wales) Newport County | Free transfer | |
| 1 July 2021 | SS | (England) | Zach Clough | (England) Wigan Athletic | Free transfer | |
| 1 July 2021 | RB | (Republic of Ireland) | Corey Whelan | (England) Wigan Athletic | Free transfer | |
| 23 July 2021 | CF | (England) | Manasse Mampala | (England) Queens Park Rangers | Free transfer | |
| 30 August 2021 | LW | (England) | Jordan Gibson | (Republic of Ireland) Sligo Rovers | Undisclosed | |
| 31 August 2021 | RB | (England) | Kelvin Mellor | (England) Morecambe | Free transfer | |
| 14 October 2021 | GK | (England) | Mark Howard | (England) Scunthorpe United | Free transfer | |
| 3 January 2022 | RB | (England) | Joel Senior | (England) Altrincham | Undisclosed | |
| 6 January 2022 | LW | (England) | Omari Patrick | (England) Burton Albion | Free transfer | |
| 31 January 2022 | CF | (England) | Kristian Dennis | (Scotland) St Mirren | Undisclosed | |
| 31 January 2022 | AM | (Republic of Ireland) | Jamie Devitt | (England) Barrow | Free transfer | |
| 31 January 2022 | CF | (England) | Tobi Sho-Silva | (England) Sutton United | Undisclosed | |

=== Loans in ===
| Date from | Position | Nationality | Name | From | Date until | Ref. |
|---|---|---|---|---|---|---|
| 20 July 2021 | GK | (Denmark) | Lukas Jensen | (England) Burnley | End of season | |
| 16 August 2021 | CF | (England) | Brad Young | (England) Aston Villa | 4 January 2022 | (Note: On 4 January 2022, Young was recalled to parent club Aston Villa.) |
| 31 August 2021 | CB | (England) | Jonathan Dinzeyi | (England) Arsenal | 3 January 2022 | (Note: On 3 January 2022, Dinzeyi was recalled to parent club Arsenal.) |
| 5 January 2022 | CF | (Belgium) | Tyrese Omotoye | (England) Norwich City | End of season | |
| 25 January 2022 | CB | (England) | Dynel Simeu | (England) Southampton | End of season | |
| 31 January 2022 | CB | (England) | Mitchell Roberts | (England) Birmingham City | End of season | |
| 31 January 2022 | CF | (England) | Owen Windsor | (England) West Bromwich Albion | End of season | |

=== Loans out ===
| Date from | Position | Nationality | Name | From | Date until | Ref. |
|---|---|---|---|---|---|---|
| 17 August 2021 | FW | (England) | Sam Fishburn | (England) Lancaster City | January 2022 | |
| 2 September 2021 | CM | (England) | Keelan Leslie | (England) Workington | October 2021 | |
| 21 October 2021 | LW | (France) | Gime Touré | (England) Aldershot Town | November 2021 | |
| 14 January 2022 | CM | (England) | Taylor Charters | (England) Gateshead | End of season (Note: On 19 February, Charters' loan at Gateshead was extended until end of the season.) | |
| 20 January 2022 | CF | (England) | Tristan Abrahams | (England) Grimsby Town | End of season | |
| 20 January 2022 | RW | (England) | Lewis Bell | (England) Warrington Town | February 2022 | |
| 25 January 2022 | CM | (England) | Josh Dixon | (England) Workington | February 2022 | |
| 31 January 2022 | CF | (England) | Manasse Mampala | (England) Weymouth | End of season | |

=== Transfers out ===
| Date | Position | Nationality | Name | To | Fee | Ref. |
|---|---|---|---|---|---|---|
| 30 June 2021 | LB | (England) | Nick Anderton | (England) Bristol Rovers | Free transfer | |
| 30 June 2021 | CM | (Scotland) | Jamie Armstrong | (England) Penrith | Released | |
| 30 June 2021 | RB | (England) | Charlie Barnes | (Scotland) Annan Athletic | Released | |
| 30 June 2021 | CB | (England) | Rhys Bennett | (England) Gillingham | Free transfer | |
| 30 June 2021 | LB | (England) | Charlie Birch | (Scotland) Annan Athletic | Released | |
| 30 June 2021 | GK | (England) | Paul Farman | (England) Barrow | Free transfer | |
| 30 June 2021 | CM | (South Africa) | Dean Furman | (England) Altrincham | Free transfer | |
| 30 June 2021 | CB | (England) | Liam Lightfoot | (England) Workington | Released | |
| 30 June 2021 | LW | (England) | Omari Patrick | (England) Burton Albion | Free transfer | |
| 30 June 2021 | CF | (England) | Cedwyn Scott | (England) Gateshead | Released | |
| 30 June 2021 | RB | (England) | Roan Steele | (Scotland) Annan Athletic | Free transfer | |
| 30 June 2021 | CB | (England) | Tom Wilson | (United States) Charleston Cougars | Released | |
| 30 June 2021 | CF | (Republic of the Congo) | Offrande Zanzala | (England) Barrow | Free transfer | |
| 16 July 2021 | DM | (England) | Ryan Swailes | (Scotland) Gretna 2008 | Free transfer | |
| 8 August 2021 | CB | (England) | Aaron Hayden | (Wales) Wrexham | Undisclosed | |
| 30 August 2021 | CB | (England) | George Tanner | (England) Bristol City | Undisclosed | |
| 15 January 2022 | CM | (England) | Keelan Leslie | (England) Workington | Free transfer | |
| 31 January 2022 | SS | (England) | Zach Clough | (Australia) Adelaide United | Mutual consent | |
