= Tobi Sho-Silva =

English footballer

Personal information
- Full name: Oluwatobi Fabian Shobowale Akintunde Sho-Silva
- Date of birth: 27 March 1995 (age 31)
- Place of birth: Thamesmead, England
- Height: 1.83 m (6 ft 0 in)
- Positions: Winger; forward

Team information
- Current team: Hampton & Richmond Borough
- Number: 12

Youth career
- –2013: Charlton Athletic

Senior career*
Years	Team	Apps	(Gls)
2013–2016	Charlton Athletic	0	(0)
2014	→ Welling United (loan)	17	(1)
2014	→ Welling United (loan)	3	(0)
2015–2016	→ Inverness Caledonian Thistle (loan)	5	(0)
2016–2017	Bromley	38	(11)
2017–2019	Dover Athletic	22	(1)
2018–2019	→ Chelmsford City (loan)	4	(0)
2019	→ Margate (loan)	10	(5)
2019–2020	FC Halifax Town	35	(5)
2020–2022	Sutton United	42	(4)
2022–2023	Carlisle United	21	(4)
2023–2025	Maidenhead United	42	(5)
2025–2026	Kidderminster Harriers	15	(1)
2026	→ Solihull Moors (loan)	7	(0)
2026–	Hampton & Richmond Borough	0	(0)

International career^{‡}
2013	England U18	1	(0)
- * Club domestic league appearances and goals as of 17:10, 21 April 2026 (UTC) ‡ National team caps and goals as of 17:10, 21 April 2026 (UTC)

Oluwatobi Fabian Shobowale Akintunde "Tobi" Sho-Silva (born 27 March 1995) is an English professional footballer who plays as a forward for Hampton & Richmond Borough.

== Career ==
After playing youth football for Charlton Athletic, Sho-Silva signed on loan for Welling United in January 2014. The loan was extended a month later. In May 2014 he signed a new contract with Charlton. After returning to his parent club, he re-signed on loan for Welling United in September 2014. He moved on loan to Inverness Caledonian Thistle in September 2015. Following his release by the Addicks, Sho-Silva joined Bromley after a successful trial spell during pre-season. At the end of the season, he departed the club, having scored 11 National League goals.

In June 2017, Sho-Silva signed for Dover Athletic. On 7 December 2018, Sho-Silva signed for Chelmsford City on a one-month loan deal. In February 2019, Sho-Silva signed on loan for Margate.

Sho-Silva was released by Dover at the end of the 2018–19 season and joined FC Halifax Town. Sho-Silva joined Sutton United in August 2020 and was part of the team that won the National League and gained promotion to the Football League for the first time in the club's history.

On 31 January 2022, Sho-Silva joined League Two side Carlisle United for an undisclosed fee on an 18-month contract.

Sho-Silva joined Maidenhead United for the 2023–24 season. Across two seasons, he scored eleven goals in 51 games for the Magpies.

Sho-Silva signed for Kidderminster Harriers ahead of the 2025-26 season. In March 2026, he joined Solihull Moors on loan for the remainder of the season.

Sho-Silva joined Hampton & Richmond Borough for the 2025-26 season.

== International career ==
Born in England, Sho-Silva is of Nigerian descent. He has represented England at under-18 level, making only one appearance in a 1–0 loss to Belgium on 5 March 2013.

== Career statistics ==
As of 25 April 2026

Club	Season	League			National Cup		League Cup		Other		Total	
Club	Season	Division	Apps	Goals	Apps	Goals	Apps	Goals	Apps	Goals	Apps	Goals
Charlton Athletic	2013–14	Championship	0	0	0	0	0	0	—		0	0
Charlton Athletic	2014–15	Championship	0	0	0	0	0	0	—		0	0
Charlton Athletic	2015–16	Championship	0	0	0	0	0	0	—		0	0
Charlton Athletic	Total		0	0	0	0	0	0	0	0	0	0
Welling United (loan)	2013–14	Conference Premier	17	1	0	0	—		—		17	1
Welling United (loan)	2014–15	Conference Premier	3	0	0	0	—		—		3	0
Inverness Caledonian Thistle (loan)	2015–16	Scottish Premiership	5	0	0	0	0	0	0	0	5	0
Bromley	2016–17	National League	38	11	1	0	—		1 (Note: Appearance in the FA Trophy)	0	40	11
Dover Athletic	2017–18	National League	14	1	0	0	—		1 (Note: Appearance(s) in Kent Senior Cup)	1	15	2
Dover Athletic	2018–19	National League	8	0	1	0	—		0	0	9	0
Dover Athletic	Total		22	1	1	0	0	0	1	1	24	2
Chelmsford City (loan)	2018–19	National League South	4	0	0	0	—		0	0	4	0
Margate (loan)	2018–19	Isthmian Premier	10	5	—		—		0	0	10	5
FC Halifax Town	2019–20	National League	35	5	1	0	—		4 (Note: 3 appearances and one goal in FA Trophy, one appearance and one goal in National League play-offs)	2	40	7
Sutton United	2020–21	National League	35	4	1	0	—		2	0	38	4
Sutton United	2021–22	League Two	7	0	1	0	0	0	4 (Note: Appearance(s) in EFL Trophy)	1	12	1
Sutton United	Total		42	4	2	0	0	0	6	1	50	5
Carlisle United	2021–22	League Two	13	4	—		—		—		13	4
Carlisle United	2022–23	League Two	8	0	2	0	0	0	0	0	10	0
Carlisle United	Total		21	4	2	0	0	0	0	0	23	4
Maidenhead United	2023–24	National League	24	4	2	3	—		2 (Note: One appearance in FA Trophy, one appearance in Berks & Bucks Senior Cup)	0	28	7
Maidenhead United	2024–25	National League	18	1	2	1	—		3 (Note: Two appearances and one goal in National League Cup, one appearance and one goal in Berks & Bucks Senior Cup)	2	23	4
Maidenhead United	Total		42	5	4	4	0	0	5	2	51	11
Kidderminster Harriers	2025–26	National League North	15	1	1	1	—		2	0	18	2
Solihull Moors (loan)	2025–26	National League	7	0	—		—		—		7	0
Career total			258	37	12	5	0	0	19	6	289	48

== Honours ==
=== Club ===
Sutton United

- National League: 2020–21
