= Jon Mellish =

English footballer (born 1997)

- Mellish playing for Wigan Athletic in 2026

Personal information
- Full name: Jon James Alexander Mellish
- Date of birth: 19 September 1997 (age 29)
- Place of birth: South Shields, England
- Height: 6 ft 2 in (1.88 m)
- Positions: Defender; midfielder

Team information
- Current team: Wigan Athletic
- Number: 22

Senior career*
Years	Team	Apps	(Gls)
2016–2019	Gateshead	57	(1)
2017	→ Newcastle Benfield (loan)		
2019–2025	Carlisle United	213	(27)
2025–	Wigan Athletic	39	(2)
2025–2026	→ Milton Keynes Dons (loan)	34	(3)

International career
2018–2019	England C	2	(0)
- * Club domestic league appearances and goals as of 11:15, 22 November 2026 (UTC)

Jon James Alexander Mellish (born 19 September 1997) is an English professional footballer who plays for EFL League One club Wigan Athletic, as a defender and midfielder.

== Early and personal life ==
Born in South Shields, Mellish attended Gateshead College.

== Career ==
Mellish began his career with Gateshead, making his senior debut during the 2016–17 season. He moved on loan to Newcastle Benfield in November 2017.

=== Carlisle United ===
He signed for Carlisle United in May 2019. He scored his first goal for Carlisle in a 1–0 win against Barrow on 3 October 2020. He signed a new contract with the club later that month. He was a prolific scorer for the club in the 2020–21 season. Mellish played in the 2023 EFL League Two play-off final at Wembley Stadium as Carlisle defeated Stockport County on penalties. After having scored an own goal in the final, Mellish would later convert his penalty in the shootout. On 29 March 2024, Mellish scored his first career hat-trick in a 3–1 away win over promotion-chasing Peterborough United.

=== Wigan Athletic ===
On 11 January 2025, Mellish signed for League One club Wigan Athletic on a three-and-a-half year deal for an undisclosed fee.

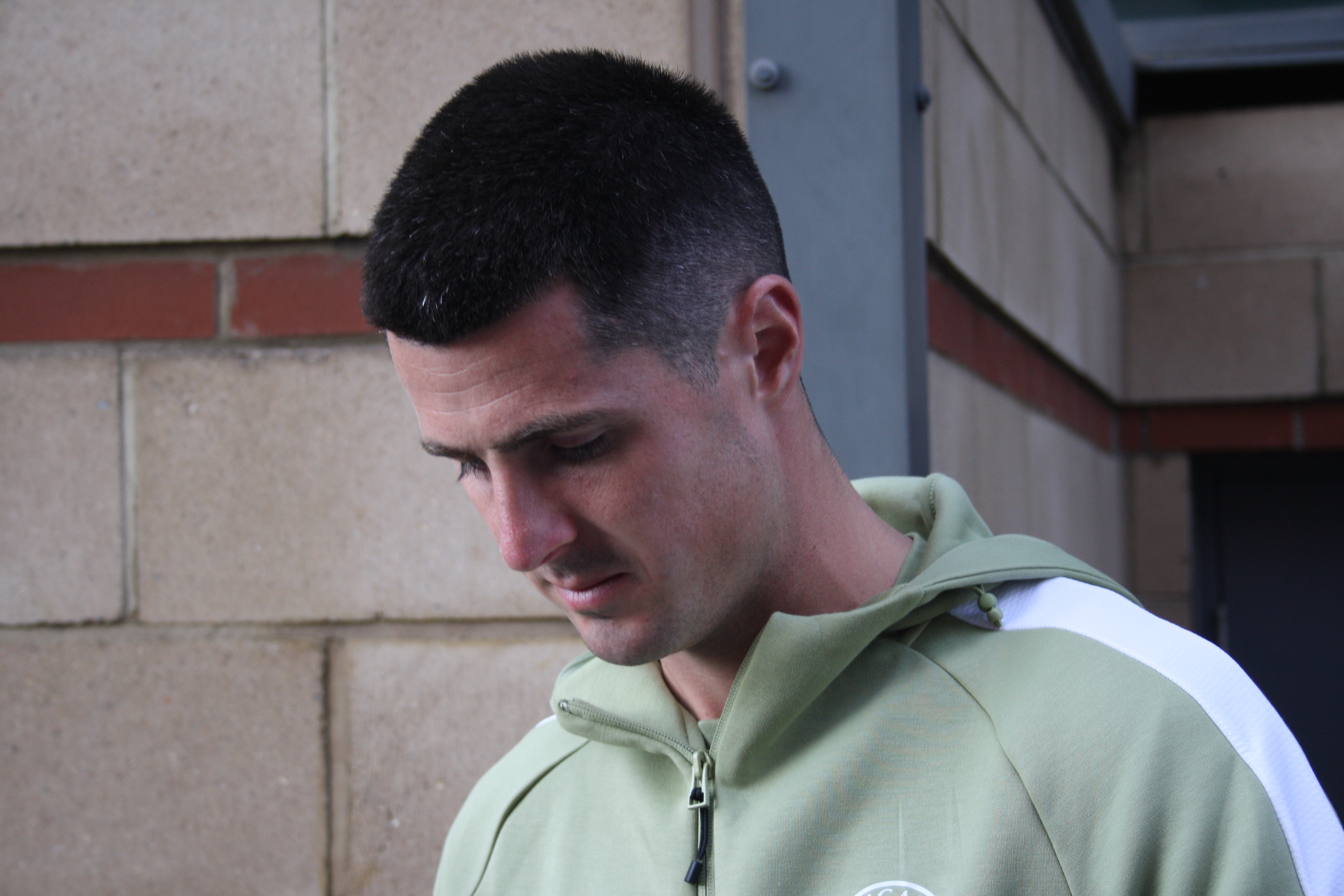
Mellish in 2025.

In August 2025 he signed on loan for League Two club Milton Keynes Dons for the rest of the season. Mellish featured 38 times, scoring three goals, and achieved a second-placed promotion with the Buckinghamshire club.

== Playing style ==
Originally a defender, Mellish was converted into a midfielder in February 2020.

== Career statistics ==
As of match played 21 November 2026

Club	Season	League			FA Cup		League Cup		Other		Total	
Club	Season	Division	Apps	Goals	Apps	Goals	Apps	Goals	Apps	Goals	Apps	Goals
Gateshead	2016–17	National League	1	0	0	0	0	0	0	0	1	0
Gateshead	2017–18	National League	10	0	0	0	0	0	0	0	10	0
Gateshead	2018–19	National League	46	1	2	1	0	0	0	0	48	2
Gateshead	Total		57	1	2	1	0	0	0	0	59	2
Carlisle United	2019–20	League Two	15	0	4	0	0	0	3 (Note: Appearance(s) in the EFL Trophy.)	0	22	0
Carlisle United	2020–21	League Two	44	11	2	3	1	0	2	2	49	16
Carlisle United	2021–22	League Two	42	3	1	0	1	0	2	0	46	3
Carlisle United	2022–23	League Two	43	6	2	0	1	0	4 (Note: Three appearances in the EFL Trophy, one appearance in the play-offs.)	0	50	6
Carlisle United	2023–24	League One	46	5	1	0	1	0	3	0	51	5
Carlisle United	2024–25	League Two	23	2	1	0	1	0	2	0	27	2
Carlisle United	Total		213	27	11	3	5	0	16	2	245	32
Wigan Athletic	2024–25	League One	21	1	0	0	0	0	0	0	21	1
Wigan Athletic	2025–26	League One	2	0	0	0	0	0	0	0	2	0
Wigan Athletic	2026–27	League One	16	1	1	1	1	0	2	0	20	2
Wigan Athletic	Total		39	2	0	0	1	0	2	0	42	2
Milton Keynes Dons (loan)	2025–26	League Two	34	3	2	0	0	0	2	0	38	3
Career total			343	33	16	5	6	0	20	2	384	40

== Honours ==
Carlisle United

- EFL League Two play-offs: 2023

Milton Keynes Dons

- EFL League Two runner-up: 2025–26
