= Stefan Ljubicic =

Icelandic footballer

Stefan Ljubičić
Personal information
- Full name: Stefan Alexander Ljubičić
- Date of birth: 5 October 1999 (age 27)
- Place of birth: Keflavík, Iceland
- Height: 1.97 m (6 ft 6 in)
- Position: Forward

Team information
- Current team: Keflavík
- Number: 10

Youth career
- Keflavík
- 2016–2019: Brighton & Hove Albion

Senior career*
Years	Team	Apps	(Gls)
2015–2016	Keflavík	3	(0)
2018–2019	Brighton & Hove Albion	0	(0)
2018	→ Bognor Regis Town (loan)	3	(0)
2019	→ Eastbourne Borough (loan)	11	(1)
2019	Grindavík	8	(1)
2020	Riga	0	(0)
2020–2021	HK	33	(7)
2022–2023	KR Reykjavík	18	(2)
2023–2024	Keflavík	19	(3)
2024	Skövde AIK	26	(0)
2025–	Keflavík	46	(20)

International career
2015	Iceland U16	3	(0)
2016	Iceland U17	5	(1)
2017	Iceland U19	5	(3)
2018	Iceland U21	4	(1)
- * Club domestic league appearances and goals as of 1 November 2026

Stefan Alexander Ljubičić (born 5 October 1999) is an Icelandic professional footballer who plays as a forward for Keflavík.

== Club career ==
=== Brighton & Hove Albion ===
After 16-year-old Ljubičić had played three games for Keflavík and several games for the youth national teams, he went on a trial at English club Norwich in October 2015 and later at Scottish club Celtic in January 2016.

However, after yet another trial, this time at Brighton & Hove Albion where he scored a goal and played very well in a friendly game against Chelsea's youth team, it was confirmed by the player's agent and Keflavík, that Ljubičić had accepted a three-year offer from the club. He would join the club in the summer 2016.

Ljubičić played for Brighton's U18 and U23 teams. In February 2018, he was loaned out to Bognor Regis Town until the end of the season. In January 2019, he was loaned out to Eastbourne Borough until the end of April 2019. However, it was confirmed in May 2019, that Ljubičić had been released.

He played a total of 35 games and scored 12 goals for Brighton's U18 team and 8 goals for the U23 team.

=== Grindavík ===
After being released by Brighton, Ljubičić returned to Grindavík in July 2019. He made eight appearances and scored one goal for the club.

=== Riga FC ===
At the beginning of November, Ljubičić joined the training camp of Latvian club Riga FC in Cyprus. He played a friendly game for the team against Pafos FC where he scored a goal. He then signed officially for the club at the end of the month. However, before playing any official games for the club, the cooperation was terminated by mutual agreement on 26 May 2020. Ljubičić had had a few minor injuries, which prevented him from playing.

=== HK ===
On 15 June 2020, Ljubičić signed a three-year deal with Icelandic club Handknattleiksfélag Kópavogs. He scored his first goal for HK on 28 August the same year. After HK was relegated for the 2022 season, Ljubičić left the club at the end of 2021.

=== KR Reykjavík ===
On 19 October 2021 it was confirmed that Ljubičić would join KR Reykjavík for the 2022 season.

=== Return to Keflavík ===
In April 2023, Ljubicic moved to Keflavík: a club he also played for in 2015–16.

=== Skövde AIK ===
On 30 March 2024, Ljubicic joined Skövde AIK in Swedish second-tier Superettan on a two-year contract.

=== Third return to Keflavík ===
Ahead of the 2025 season, Ljubicic once again returned to Keflavík for his third spell at the club.

== Personal life ==
Stefan is the son of Bosnian Serb refugee Zoran Ljubičić, a former Icelandic football player and coach. His older brother, Bojan Stefan Ljubičić, is also a footballer. In his youth, Stefan played basketball for Keflavík ÍF for four years and was a member of the Icelandic junior national basketball teams.
