= Gime Touré =

French footballer (born 1994)

Personal information
- Date of birth: 7 May 1994 (age 32)
- Height: 1.88 m (6 ft 2 in)
- Positions: Winger; striker

Team information
- Current team: Doğan Türk Birliği
- Number: 23

Youth career
- Linas-Montlhéry

Senior career*
Years	Team	Apps	(Gls)
2012–2013	Brest II	4	(0)
2013–2014	Viry-Châtillon	1	(0)
2015–2016	La Roche	25	(7)
2016–2017	Fontenay	7	(0)
2017–2018	Macclesfield Town	11	(0)
2018	AFC Fylde	19	(4)
2018–2019	Sutton United	22	(3)
2019–2020	Hartlepool United	34	(12)
2020–2022	Carlisle United	39	(2)
2021	→ Aldershot Town (loan)	3	(0)
2022	Yeovil Town	13	(2)
2023	Cove Rangers	5	(0)
2023–2024	Göçmenköy İdman Yurdu (tr)	27	(13)
2024–	Doğan Türk Birliği	56	(25)
- * Club domestic league appearances and goals as of 20:13, 21 May 2026 (UTC)

Gime Touré (born 7 May 1994) is a French professional footballer who plays as a winger and striker for KTFF Süper Lig club Doğan Türk Birliği.

== Career ==
Touré spent his early career with Brest II, Viry-Châtillon, La Roche, Fontenay, Macclesfield Town, AFC Fylde, Sutton United and Hartlepool United. He played a pre-season friendly for Port Vale during a trial in the summer of 2018. He spent one season with Hartlepool, where he finished the 2019–20 season as top scorer for them with 13 goals in all competitions.

He left Hartlepool at the end of the 2019–20 season after expressing a desire to play at a higher level. In August 2020 he signed for Carlisle United. Touré scored on his debut against Fleetwood Town in the EFL Trophy, opening the scoring in a 3–1 home defeat, before later being sent off in the game. On 21 October 2021, Toure returned to the National League to join Aldershot Town on loan. On 9 May 2022, it was announced that Touré would be released by Carlisle United at the end of the 2021–22 season.

On 12 August 2022, Touré signed for National League side Yeovil Town. On 9 December 2022, Touré left Yeovil by mutual consent.

On 3 February 2023, Touré joined Scottish Championship club Cove Rangers.

== Career statistics ==
As of match played 3 May 2026

Appearances and goals by club, season and competition
Club	Season	League			National Cup		League Cup		Other		Total	
Club	Season	Division	Apps	Goals	Apps	Goals	Apps	Goals	Apps	Goals	Apps	Goals
Brest II	2012–13	Championnat National 3	4	0	—		—		0	0	4	0
Viry-Châtillon	2013–14	Championnat National 2	1	0	0	0	—		0	0	1	0
La Roche VF	2015–16	Championnat National 3	25	7	0	0	—		0	0	25	7
Vendée Fontenay	2016–17	Championnat National 2	7	0	0	0	—		0	0	7	0
Macclesfield Town	2017–18	National League	11	0	1	0	—		0	0	12	0
AFC Fylde	2018–19	National League	19	4	1	0	—		0	0	20	4
Sutton United	2018–19	National League	22	3	0	0	—		0	0	22	3
Hartlepool United	2019–20	National League	34	12	5	1	—		1 (Note: Appearance in the FA Trophy.)	0	40	13
Carlisle United	2020–21	League Two	34	2	1	0	1	0	2 (Note: Appearance(s) in the EFL Trophy.)	2	38	4
Carlisle United	2021–22	League Two	5	0	0	0	1	0	1	0	7	0
Carlisle United	Total		39	2	1	0	2	0	3	2	45	4
Aldershot Town (loan)	2021–22	National League	3	0	0	0	—		0	0	3	0
Yeovil Town	2022–23	National League	13	2	1	0	—		0	0	14	2
Cove Rangers	2022–23	Scottish Championship	5	0	0	0	0	0	0	0	5	0
Göçmenköy İdman Yurdu (tr)	2023–24	KTFF Süper Lig	27	13	7	4	0	0	0	0	34	17
Doğan Türk Birliği	2024–25	KTFF Süper Lig	30	13	2	1	0	0	0	0	32	14
Doğan Türk Birliği	2025–26	KTFF Süper Lig	26	12	2	0	0	0	0	0	28	12
Doğan Türk Birliği	Total		56	25	4	1	0	0	0	0	60	26
Career total			266	68	20	6	2	0	4	2	292	76
