= Lewis Bell (footballer) =

English footballer (born 2002)

Personal information
- Full name: Lewis James Bell
- Date of birth: 29 September 2002 (age 24)
- Place of birth: Carlisle, England
- Height: 1.81 m (5 ft 11 in)
- Position: Midfielder

Team information
- Current team: Gretna 2008
- Number: 6

Youth career
- 2011–2020: Carlisle United

Senior career*
Years	Team	Apps	(Gls)
2020–2023	Carlisle United	2	(0)
2022	→ Warrington Town (loan)	1	(0)
2022–2023	→ Gretna 2008 (loan)	31	(4)
2023–	Gretna 2008	21	(1)
- * Club domestic league appearances and goals as of 15 April 2023

Lewis James Bell (born 29 September 2002) is an English professional footballer who plays as a midfielder for Gretna 2008.

== Career ==
Bell came through the youth-team at Carlisle United and in September 2020 signed his first professional contract, a two-year contract with a one-year club option, to begin in July 2021. He made his first-team debut for the "Blues" on 6 October 2020, coming on as a 54th-minute substitute for Taylor Charters in a 5–3 defeat at Sunderland in the group stages of the EFL Trophy.

In January 2022 he joined Warrington Town on loan.

== Career statistics ==
As of match played 7 December 2022

Appearances and goals by club, season and competition
Club	Season	League			National cup		League cup		Other		Total	
Club	Season	Division	Apps	Goals	Apps	Goals	Apps	Goals	Apps	Goals	Apps	Goals
Carlisle United	2020–21	League Two	1	0	0	0	0	0	2 (Note: Appearance/s in the EFL Trophy.)	0	3	0
Carlisle United	2021–22	League Two	1	0	0	0	1	0	1	0	3	0
Warrington Town (loan)	2021–22	Northern Premier League Premier Division	1	0	—		—		—		1	0
Gretna 2008 (loan)	2022–23	Lowland Football League	31	4	2	1	0	0	0	0	33	5
Career total			34	4	2	1	1	0	3	0	40	5
