= Sam Fishburn (footballer) =

English footballer (born 2003)

Personal information
- Full name: Sam Fishburn
- Date of birth: 26 November 2003 (age 22)
- Place of birth: Gateshead, England
- Position: Forward

Team information
- Current team: Blyth Town

Youth career
- 2020–2021: Carlisle United

Senior career*
Years	Team	Apps	(Gls)
2021–2023	Carlisle United	9	(0)
2021	→ Lancaster City (loan)	9	(8)
2022	→ Blyth Spartans (loan)	6	(0)
2022–2023	→ Morpeth Town (loan)	30	(6)
2023–2024	Fleetwood Town	0	(0)
2024	→ York City (loan)	3	(0)
2024–2025	Scunthorpe United	16	(2)
2024	→ Spennymoor Town (loan)	2	(0)
2025	→ Gainsborough Trinity (loan)	5	(0)
2025	→ Ashington (loan)	4	(0)
2025–	Blyth Town	3	(0)
- * Club domestic league appearances and goals as of 11:10, 31 August 2025 (UTC)

Sam Fishburn (born 26 November 2003) is an English professional footballer who plays as a forward for Northern League Division One club Blyth Town.

== Career ==
Born in Gateshead, Fishburn joined Carlisle United's youth team in 2020 and, following a prolific season with the club's under-18 side, he signed a two-year senior contract in summer 2021 with a further one-year option. On 17 August 2021, Fishburn joined Northern Premier League Premier Division club Lancaster City on loan until January 2022. After 8 goals in 9 matches for Lancaster City, he was recalled by Carlisle in late September. He made his debut for Carlisle on 28 September 2021 as a substitute against Everton U21 in the EFL Trophy, and made his league debut off the bench the following month in a 2–2 draw away to Newport County.

On 28 July 2022, Fishburn joined National League North club Blyth Spartans for a three-month loan deal. On 12 September 2022, days after his loan spell at Blyth came to an end, he joined Northern Premier League Premier Division side Morpeth Town on a loan-deal until the end of the season, with a recall option after 28 days. Morpeth had previously tried to sign Fishburn in pre-season, but Carlisle felt like the loan move to Blyth would be a better option.

On 30 June 2023, following his release from Carlisle, he signed for EFL League One side Fleetwood Town on a one-year contract with the club holding the option of a further year. He was placed into Matthew Lawlor's Development Squad. In March 2024, he joined National League club York City on loan for the remainder of the season. At the end of the 2023-2024 season he was released by Fleetwood Town.

On 13 June 2024, following his release from Fleetwood Town, he signed for National League North side Scunthorpe United On 29 November 2024, he joined Spennymoor Town in a loan-swap deal. In February 2025, he joined Ashington on an initial one-month loan, following a similar spell with Gainsborough Trinity. He departed Scunthorpe at the end of the 2024–25 season.

In June 2025, Fishburn joined Northern Premier League Division One East club Blyth Town.

== Career statistics ==
As of match played 30 August 2025

Appearances and goals by club, season and competition
Club	Season	League			FA Cup		EFL Cup		Other		Total	
Club	Season	Division	Apps	Goals	Apps	Goals	Apps	Goals	Apps	Goals	Apps	Goals
Carlisle United	2020–21	League Two	0	0	0	0	0	0	0	0	0	0
Carlisle United	2021–22	League Two	9	0	2	0	0	0	4 (Note: Appearance(s) in EFL Trophy)	0	15	0
Carlisle United	Total		9	0	2	0	0	0	4	0	15	0
Lancaster City (loan)	2021–22	NPL Premier Division	9	8	—		—		—		9	8
Blyth Spartans (loan)	2022–23	National League North	6	0	—		—		—		6	0
Morpeth Town (loan)	2022–23	NPL Premier Division	30	6	—		—		1 (Note: Appearance(s) in FA Trophy)	0	31	6
Fleetwood Town	2023–24	League One	0	0	0	0	0	0	0	0	0	0
York City (loan)	2023–24	National League	3	0	0	0	—		0	0	3	0
Scunthorpe United	2024–25	National League North	16	2	3	0	—		2 (Note: One appearance in FA Trophy, one appearance in National League North play-offs)	0	21	2
Spennymoor Town (loan)	2024–25	National League North	2	0	0	0	—		0	0	2	0
Gainsborough Trinity (loan)	2024–25	NPL Premier Division	5	0	0	0	—		0	0	5	0
Ashington	2024–25	NPL Division One East	4	0	0	0	—		0	0	4	0
Blyth Town	2025–26	NPL Division One East	3	0	1	0	—		0	0	4	0
Career total			87	16	6	0	0	0	7	0	100	16

== Honours ==
Scunthorpe United

- National League North play-offs: 2025
