= 2020–21 Carlisle United F.C. season =

Carlisle United
2020–21 season
- Chairman: Andrew Jenkins
- Head Coach: Chris Beech
- Stadium: Brunton Park
- League Two: 10th
- FA Cup: Second round
- EFL Cup: First round
- EFL Trophy: Group stage
- Top goalscorer: League: Jon Mellish (11); All: Jon Mellish (16)
Home colours	Away colours

The 2020–21 season was Carlisle United's 116th season in their history and the seventh consecutive season in EFL League Two, Along with League Two, the club also participated in the FA Cup, EFL Cup, and EFL Trophy.

The season covers the period from 1 July 2020 to 30 June 2021.

== Squad statistics ==
As of 9 May 2021

No.	Pos	Nat	Player	Total		League Two		FA Cup		League Cup		EFL Trophy	
No.	Pos	Nat	Player	Apps	Goals	Apps	Goals	Apps	Goals	Apps	Goals	Apps	Goals
1	GK	(England) ENG	Magnus Norman	6	0	4+0	0	0+0	0	0+0	0	1+1	0
2	DF	(England) ENG	George Tanner	42	3	36+1	3	2+0	0	1+0	0	2+0	0
3	DF	(England) ENG	Nick Anderton	44	2	33+7	2	1+1	0	1+0	0	1+0	0
4	MF	(England) ENG	Danny Devine	13	0	5+5	0	0+0	0	0+0	0	3+0	0
5	DF	(England) ENG	Max Hunt (transferred out)	5	0	0+2	0	1+0	0	0+0	0	2+0	0
6	DF	(England) ENG	Aaron Hayden	48	5	42+1	5	2+0	0	1+0	0	2+0	0
7	MF	(England) ENG	Joe Riley	48	2	38+5	2	2+0	0	1+0	0	2+0	0
8	MF	(England) ENG	Callum Guy	48	0	44+0	0	1+1	0	1+0	0	0+1	0
9	FW	(England) ENG	Lewis Alessandra	50	9	37+8	8	0+2	0	1+0	0	2+0	1
10	FW	(Republic of the Congo) CGO	Offrande Zanzala	22	6	15+7	6	0+0	0	0+0	0	0+0	0
10	FW	(Scotland) SCO	Gavin Reilly (transferred)	21	1	5+11	0	1+1	0	0+1	0	2+0	1
11	FW	(England) ENG	Omari Patrick	39	5	28+8	5	2+0	0	0+0	0	1+0	0
12	MF	(England) ENG	Jon Mellish	49	16	41+3	11	2+0	3	1+0	0	1+1	2
13	DF	(England) ENG	Rod McDonald	31	0	28+1	0	0+0	0	1+0	0	1+0	0
14	FW	(Republic of Ireland) IRL	Joshua Kayode	36	8	31+3	8	2+0	0	0+0	0	0+0	0
15	MF	(England) ENG	Taylor Charters	11	0	1+7	0	0+0	0	0+1	0	2+0	0
16	MF	(England) ENG	Brennan Dickenson	12	1	7+5	1	0+0	0	0+0	0	0+0	0
17	DF	(Scotland) SCO	Jack Armer	28	1	22+2	1	1+0	0	0+1	0	2+0	0
18	MF	(England) ENG	Josh Dixon	4	0	0+2	0	0+1	0	0+0	0	0+1	0
19	MF	(South Africa) RSA	Dean Furman	18	0	6+9	0	1+0	0	1+0	0	0+1	0
20	FW	(France) FRA	Gime Touré	35	4	18+13	2	1+0	0	1+0	0	2+0	2
21	GK	(England) ENG	Paul Farman	45	0	42+0	0	1+0	0	1+0	0	1+0	0
24	DF	(England) ENG	Tom Wilson	0	0	0+0	0	0+0	0	0+0	0	0+0	0
27	GK	(England) ENG	Marcus Dewhurst	2	0	0+0	0	1+0	0	0+0	0	1+0	0
28	MF	(England) ENG	Lewis Bell	3	0	0+1	0	0+0	0	0+0	0	0+2	0
30	MF	(England) ENG	Connor Malley (loan complete)	4	0	0+3	0	0+0	0	0+0	0	1+0	0
31	FW	(England) ENG	Micah Obiero (loan complete)	6	1	0+4	0	0+1	0	0+0	0	1+0	1
31	FW	(England) ENG	Cedwyn Scott	7	0	0+7	0	0+0	0	0+0	0	0+0	0
32	DF	(England) ENG	Rhys Bennett	24	4	21+2	4	0+0	0	0+0	0	1+0	0
33	FW	(England) ENG	Ethan Walker	15	0	4+10	0	0+0	0	0+0	0	1+0	0

=== Top scorers ===
Place	Position	Nation	Number	Name	League Two	FA Cup	League Cup	EFL Trophy	Total
1	MF	(England)	12	Jon Mellish	11	3	0	2	16
2	FW	(England)	9	Lewis Alessandra	8	0	0	1	9
3	FW	(Nigeria)	14	Joshua Kayode	8	0	0	0	8
4	FW	(Republic of the Congo)	10	Offrande Zanzala	6	0	0	0	6
5	MF	(England)	6	Aaron Hayden	5	0	0	0	5
5	FW	(England)	11	Omari Patrick	5	0	0	0	5
7	FW	(England)	32	Rhys Bennett	4	0	0	0	4
7	FW	(France)	20	Gime Touré	2	0	0	2	4
9	DF	(England)	18	George Tanner	3	0	0	0	3
10	DF	(England)	3	Nick Anderton	2	0	0	0	2
10	MF	(England)	7	Joe Riley	2	0	0	0	2
12	DF	(Scotland)	17	Jack Armer	1	0	0	0	1
12	MF	(England)	16	Brennan Dickenson	1	0	0	0	1
12	FW	(England)	31	Micah Obiero	0	0	0	1	1
12	FW	(Scotland)	10	Gavin Reilly	1	0	0	0	1
Own goals					2	0	0	0	2
				TOTALS	60	3	0	7	70

=== Disciplinary record ===
Position	Nation	Number	Name	League Two		FA Cup		League Cup		EFL Trophy		Total	
Position	Nation	Number	Name	Booked	Sent off (straight red)	Booked	Sent off (straight red)	Booked	Sent off (straight red)	Booked	Sent off (straight red)	Booked	Sent off (straight red)
FW	(France)	20	Gime Touré	2	1	0	0	0	0	0	1	2	2
DF	(England)	6	Aaron Hayden	8	1	0	0	1	0	0	0	8	1
DF	(England)	13	Rod McDonald	2	1	0	0	1	0	0	0	3	1
MF	(England)	12	Jon Mellish	11	0	0	0	0	0	0	0	11	0
MF	(England)	8	Callum Guy	8	0	0	0	0	0	0	0	8	0
DF	(England)	3	Nick Anderton	6	0	0	0	1	0	0	0	7	0
MF	(England)	7	Joe Riley	7	0	0	0	0	0	0	0	7	0
FW	(England)	9	Lewis Alessandra	5	0	0	0	0	0	0	0	5	0
DF	(England)	32	Rhys Bennett	5	0	0	0	0	0	0	0	5	0
DF	(England)	2	George Tanner	5	0	0	0	0	0	0	0	5	0
GK	(England)	21	Paul Farman	4	0	0	0	0	0	0	0	4	0
MF	(Scotland)	17	Jack Armer	3	0	0	0	0	0	0	0	3	0
FW	(England)	11	Omari Patrick	2	0	1	0	0	0	0	0	3	0
FW	(Republic of the Congo)	10	Offrande Zanzala	3	0	0	0	0	0	0	0	3	0
MF	(England)	15	Taylor Charters	2	0	0	0	0	0	0	0	2	0
MF	(South Africa)	19	Dean Furman	1	0	1	0	0	0	0	0	2	0
FW	(Republic of Ireland)	14	Joshua Kayode	1	0	1	0	0	0	0	0	2	0
FW	(England)	31	Micah Obiero	1	0	0	0	0	0	1	0	2	0
MF	(England)	4	Danny Devine	1	0	0	0	0	0	0	0	1	0
MF	(England)	16	Brennan Dickenson	1	0	0	0	0	0	0	0	1	0
FW	(Scotland)	10	Gavin Reilly	1	0	0	0	0	0	0	0	1	0
FW	(England)	33	Ethan Walker	1	0	0	0	0	0	0	0	1	0
			TOTALS	75	3	3	0	3	0	1	1	82	4

== Pre-season ==
11 August 2020 Friendly	Fleetwood Town	4–2	Carlisle United	Thornton-Cleveleys
13:00 BST	Evans 38'; McDonald 51' (o.g.); Garner 60'; Morris 70'	Report	Alessandra 5'; Mellish 43'	Stadium: Poolfoot Farm; Attendance: 0 Referee: Sam Barrott

18 August 2020 Friendly	Gateshead	1–1	Carlisle United	Gateshead
19:00 BST	Trialist 71'	Report	Kayode 31'	Stadium: Gateshead International Stadium; Attendance: 0 Referee: Geoff Eltringham

22 August 2020 Friendly	Wigan Athletic	1–2	Carlisle United	Euxton
	Crankshaw 48'	Report	Touré 40'; Alessandra 58'	Stadium: Euxton Training Ground; Attendance: Behind closed doors

== Competitions ==
=== EFL League Two ===
==== League table ====
Pos	Team	Pld	W	D	L	GF	GA	GD	Pts	Promotion, qualification or relegation
6	Forest Green Rovers	46	20	13	13	59	51	+8	73	Qualification for League Two play-offs
7	Tranmere Rovers	46	20	13	13	55	50	+5	73	Qualification for League Two play-offs
8	Salford City	46	19	14	13	54	34	+20	71	
9	Exeter City	46	18	16	12	71	50	+21	70	
10	Carlisle United	46	18	12	16	60	51	+9	66	
11	Leyton Orient	46	17	10	19	53	55	−2	61	
12	Crawley Town	46	16	13	17	56	62	−6	61	
13	Port Vale	46	17	9	20	57	57	0	60	
14	Stevenage	46	14	18	14	41	41	0	60	

Updated to match(es) played on 31 May 2021. Source: EFL Official Website
Rules for classification: 1) Points; 2) Goal difference; 3) Number of goals scored; 4) Head-to-head results; 5) Wins; 6) Away goals; 7) Penalty points (sec 9.5); 8) 12-point sending off offences

==== Results summary ====
Overall								Home						Away					
Pld	W	D	L	GF	GA	GD	Pts	W	D	L	GF	GA	GD	W	D	L	GF	GA	GD
46	18	12	16	60	51	+9	66	12	5	6	38	25	+13	6	7	10	22	26	−4

Last updated: 8 May 2021.
Source: BBC

==== Results by matchday ====
Matchday	1	2	3	4	5	6	7	8	9	10	11	12	13	14	15	16	17	18	19	20	21	22	23	24	25	26	27	28	29	30	31	32	33	34	35	36	37	38	39	40	41	42	43	44	45	46
Ground	A	H	A	H	A	H	A	A	H	A	H	H	A	A	H	A	H	H	A	H	A	H	H	A	A	H	H	A	A	H	H	A	A	H	H	H	A	H	A	A	H	A	H	A	A	H
Result	L	W	L	W	W	W	D	D	W	L	W	L	W	L	W	W	W	W	L	D	W	W	L	L	D	L	L	L	L	D	W	D	L	L	L	W	W	W	D	D	D	L	D	D	W	D
Position	23	12	17	11	7	5	5	7	4	8	5	6	5	6	5	4	3	2	3	3	1	2	3	9	9	10	10	12	13	13	12	11	11	12	14	11	10	9	10	9	10	11	10	10	10	10

Updated to match(es) played on 8 May 2021. Source: 11v11 for league tables and fixtures
A = Away; H = Home; W = Win; D = Draw; L = Loss

==== Matches ====
Win Draw Loss Postponed

The 2020–21 season fixtures were released on 21 August.

12 September 2020 1	Cambridge United	3–0	Carlisle United	Cambridge
15:00 BST	Hannant 9'; Mullin 16'; Digby (yellow card) 45+2'; Ironside 86'	Report	Patrick (yellow card) 45+2'; Guy (yellow card) 76'; Touré (yellow card) 88'; Mellish (yellow card) 89'	Stadium: Abbey Stadium; Attendance: 0 Referee: Paul Howard

19 September 2020 2	Carlisle United	2–0	Southend United	Carlisle
13:00 BST	Anderton (yellow card) 16'; Patrick 36'; Kayode 39'	Report		Stadium: Brunton Park; Attendance: 1,000; Referee: Graham Salisbury

26 September 2020 3	Scunthorpe United	1–0	Carlisle United	Scunthorpe
15:00 BST	Hallam 35'; Spence (yellow card) 73'; Beestin (yellow card) 84'	Report		Stadium: Sands Venue Stadium; Attendance: 0 Referee: Peter Wright

3 October 2020 4	Carlisle United	1–0	Barrow	Carlisle
15:00 BST	Mellish (yellow card) 10' (goal) 24'; Hayden (red card) 55'; Anderton (yellow card) 70'; Guy (yellow card) 90+1'	Report	Quigley (yellow card) 75'; Brough (yellow card) 80'; Hardcastle (yellow card) 90+4'; Kay (yellow card) 90+7'	Stadium: Brunton Park; Attendance: 0 Referee: Ben Toner

10 October 2020 5	Port Vale	0–1	Carlisle United	Burslem
15:00 BST	Crookes (yellow card) 20'; Whitehead (yellow card) 41'; Pope (penalty missed) 51'; Montaño (yellow card) 90+2'	Report	Alessandra (yellow card) 42'; Mellish 55'	Stadium: Vale Park; Attendance: 0 Referee: James Bell

17 October 2020 6	Carlisle United	3–2	Colchester United	Carlisle
15:00 BST	Alessandra 4'; Riley (yellow card) 22'; Mellish 29' (yellow card) 61'; Guy (yellow card) 64'; Hayden 81'	Report	Pell (yellow card) 34'; Norris 44', 52' (pen.); Harriott (yellow card) 61'	Stadium: Brunton Park; Attendance: 0 Referee: Martin Coy

20 October 2020 7	Oldham Athletic	1–1	Carlisle United	Oldham
19:00 BST	Barnett (yellow card) 61'; Dearnley 80'	Report	Hayden 54'	Stadium: Boundary Park; Attendance: 0 Referee: Matt Donohue

24 October 2020 8	Grimsby Town	1–1	Carlisle United	Cleethorpes
15:00 BST	Pollock 24' (yellow card) 90+3'; Taylor (yellow card) 37'; Waterfall (yellow card) 76'; Starbuck (yellow card) 82'	Report	Anderton (yellow card) 18'; McKeown 46' (o.g.)	Stadium: Blundell Park; Attendance: 0 Referee: Christopher Pollard

27 October 2020 9	Carlisle United	3–1	Morecambe	Carlisle
19:00 GMT	Songo'o 1' (o.g.); Mellish 3'; Riley (yellow card) 37'; Tanner 87'; Reilly (yellow card) 89'	Report	O'Sullivan (yellow card) 50'; Songo'o 79' (yellow card) 81'	Stadium: Brunton Park; Attendance: 0 Referee: Ross Joyce

31 October 2020 10	Exeter City	1–0	Carlisle United	Exeter
13:00 GMT	Parkes 48'; Sparkes (yellow card) 53'	Report	Touré (red card) 60'	Stadium: St James Park; Attendance: 0 Referee: James Adcock

3 November 2020 11	Carlisle United	3–2	Newport County	Carlisle
19:00 GMT	Alessandra 15' (pen.); McDonald (yellow card) 48'; Mellish 68', 81'	Report	Labadie (yellow card) 22'; Devitt 84'; Sheehan 90+2'	Stadium: Brunton Park; Attendance: 0 Referee: Scott Oldham

14 November 2020 12	Carlisle United	1–2	Cheltenham Town	Carlisle
15:00 GMT	Mellish 45+3'	Report	Boyle 15'; Thomas 36' (pen.)	Stadium: Brunton Park; Attendance: 0 Referee: Andy Haines

21 November 2020 13	Crawley Town	0–3	Carlisle United	Crawley
13:30 GMT	Sesay (red card) 80'	Report	Bennett 43'; Kayode 55'; Hayden 62'; Guy (yellow card) 78'	Stadium: The People's Pension Stadium; Attendance: 0 Referee: Antony Coggins

24 November 2020 14	Tranmere Rovers	1–0	Carlisle United	Tranmere
19:00 GMT	Blackett-Taylor 51'; Monthé (yellow card) 54'; Lewis (yellow card) 69'	Report	Hayden (yellow card) 67'	Stadium: Prenton Park; Attendance: 0 Referee: David Rock

2 December 2020 15	Carlisle United	2–1	Salford City	Carlisle
19:00 GMT	Guy (yellow card) 2'; Alessandra 33'; Mellish (yellow card) 36'; Kayode (yellow card) 45'; Bennett 56'; Tanner (yellow card) 66'	Report	Touray (yellow card) 64'; Bernard (yellow card) 88' (goal) 90'	Stadium: Brunton Park; Attendance: 2,000 (Note: Spectators numbers limited to 2,000 due to local restrictions surrounding the COVID-19 pandemic.); Referee: Graham Salisbury

5 December 2020 16	Bradford City	0–1	Carlisle United	Bradford
15:00 GMT		Report	Bennett 57' (yellow card) 64'; Hayden (yellow card) 61'	Stadium: Utilita Energy Stadium; Attendance: 0 Referee: Geoff Eltringham

12 December 2020 17	Carlisle United	4–0	Stevenage	Carlisle
15:00 GMT	Anderton 10'; Kayode 20'; Alessandra 34'; Riley 73'	Report	Vincelot (yellow card) 43'; Prosser (yellow card) 44' (yellow-red card) 74'	Stadium: Brunton Park; Attendance: 2,000; Referee: Robert Lewis

15 December 2020 18	Carlisle United	1–0	Mansfield Town	Carlisle
19:00 GMT	Patrick 39'; Hayden (yellow card) 61'; Bennett (yellow card) 65'; Mellish (yellow card) 68'; Farman (yellow card) 69'; Riley (yellow card) 88'	Report	Clarke (yellow card) 64'	Stadium: Brunton Park; Attendance: 0 Referee: Peter Wright

19 December 2020 19	Forest Green Rovers	1–0	Carlisle United	Nailsworth
15:00 GMT	Matt 76'	Report	Alessandra (yellow card) 19'; Riley (yellow card) 44'; Farman (yellow card) 50'; Taylor Charters (yellow card) 90̟+1'	Stadium: The New Lawn; Attendance: 920; Referee: Alan Young

26 December 2020 20	Carlisle United	3–3	Bolton Wanderers	Carlisle
15:00 GMT	Hayden 5'; Alessandra 7'; Riley (yellow card) 24'; Patrick 39'; Bennett (yellow card) 45'; Mellish (yellow card) 48'; Farman (yellow card) 64'	Report	Jones (yellow card) 22'; Thomason 44' (yellow card) 81'; Kioso (yellow card) 50' (goal) 88' (red card) 90+4'; Delfouneso 86'	Stadium: Brunton Park; Attendance: 2,000; Referee: Ross Joyce

29 December 2020 21	Harrogate Town	1–0 (Note: Match abandoned in the 13th minute due to the state of the pitch. Match was to be played 12 January 2021 in full from the start.)	Carlisle United	Harrogate
19:45 GMT	Kirby 1'	Report		Stadium: The EnviroVent Stadium; Referee: Martin Coy

2 January 2021 21	Walsall	0–2	Carlisle United	Walsall
15:00 GMT	Gordon (yellow card) 52'; Bates (yellow card) 59'	Report	Patrick 26'; Charters (yellow card) 27'; Armer (yellow card) 57'; Kayode 78'; Hayden (yellow card) 80'	Stadium: Banks Stadium; Referee: James Oldham

9 January 2021 (Note: Match rescheduled due to frozen pitch) 22	Carlisle United	v	Leyton Orient	Carlisle
15:00 GMT		Report		Stadium: Brunton Park

12 January 2021 (Note: Match was abandoned after 10 minutes due to floodlight issues at the EnviroVent Stadium) 22	Harrogate Town	v	Carlisle United	Harrogate
19:00 GMT		Report		Stadium: The EnviroVent Stadium

19 January 2021 (Note: Match rescheduled due to outbreak of COVID-19 in the club) 22	Mansfield Town	v	Carlisle United	Mansfield
15:00 GMT		Report		Stadium: One Call Stadium

22 January 2021 (Note: Match rescheduled due to frozen pitch) 22	Carlisle United	v	Leyton Orient	Carlisle
19:00 GMT		Report		Stadium: Brunton Park

24 January 2021 (Note: Match rescheduled due to outbreak of COVID-19 in the club) 22	Carlisle United	v	Forest Green Rovers	Carlisle
15:00 GMT				Stadium: Brunton Park

26 January 2021 (Note: Match rescheduled due to waterlogged pitch) 22	Newport County	v	Carlisle United	Newport
19:00 GMT		Report		Stadium: Rodney Parade

30 January 2021 22	Carlisle United	1–0	Exeter City	Carlisle
13:00 GMT	Alessandra 9'; Anderton (yellow card) 90+2'	Report	Parkes (yellow card) 83'	Stadium: Brunton Park; Attendance: 0 Referee: Martin Coy

2 February 2021 23	Carlisle United	1–2	Forest Green Rovers	Carlisle
18:00 GMT	Toure 72'; Bennett (yellow card) 73'; Riley (yellow card) 76'	Report	Collins 60' (pen.); Bailey 75' (yellow card) 76'; Sweeney (yellow card) 82'; Cargill (yellow card) 90+3'	Stadium: Brunton Park; Referee: Declan Bourne

6 February 2021 (Note: Match rescheduled due to outbreak of COVID-19 in the Cheltenham Town F.C.) 24	Cheltenham Town	v	Carlisle United	Cheltenham
15:00 GMT				Stadium: Whaddon Road Ground

9 February 2021 (Note: Match rescheduled due to frozen pitch) 24	Carlisle United	v	Leyton Orient	Carlisle
14:00 GMT		Report		Stadium: Brunton Park

13 February 2021 (Note: Match rescheduled due to frozen pitch) 24	Carlisle United	v	Crawley Town	Carlisle
15:00 GMT		Report		Stadium: Brunton Park

16 February 2021 24	Harrogate Town	1–0	Carlisle United	Harrogate
19:00 GMT	Marsh 28' (pen.); Francis (yellow card) 66'	Report	Tanner (yellow card) 76'	Stadium: The EnviroVent Stadium; Referee: Seb Stockbridge

20 February 2021 25	Salford City	1–1	Carlisle United	Salford
15:00 GMT	Touray (yellow card) 17'; Turnbull (yellow card) 58'; Wilson 79'	Report	Tanner 11'; Bennett (yellow card) 45+1'; Mellish (yellow card) 55'	Stadium: Moor Lane; Attendance: 0 Referee: Kevin Johnson

23 February 2021 26	Carlisle United	2–3	Tranmere Rovers	Carlisle
19:00 GMT	Kayode 3'; Anderton 27'	Report	Lewis (yellow card) 12'; Woolery 21'; Vaughan 43', 88'	Stadium: Brunton Park; Attendance: 0 Referee: Ben Speedie

27 February 2021 27	Carlisle United	1–3	Oldham Athletic	Carlisle
15:00 GMT	Kayode 35'; Tanner (yellow card) 70'; Anderton (yellow card) 85'	Report	Diarra (yellow card) 33'; Hilßner 71' (pen.); Bahamboula 78'; Piergianni 86'	Stadium: Brunton Park; Attendance: 0 Referee: Carl Boyeson

2 March 2021 28	Colchester United	2–1	Carlisle United	Colchester
19:00 GMT	Harriott 67' (pen.) 74'; Tchamadeu (yellow card) 90+2'	Report	Mellish 29'	Stadium: JobServe Community Stadium; Attendance: 0 Referee: Brett Huxtable

6 March 2021 29	Morecambe	3–1	Carlisle United	Morecambe
15:00 GMT	Lavelle (yellow card) 12'; Wildig 32'; Diagouraga 37'; Mellor (yellow card) 45+2'; Stockton 53'	Report	Alessandra (yellow card) 39'; Hayden 79'	Stadium: Mazuma Stadium; Attendance: 0 Referee: Sam Allison

9 March 2021 30	Carlisle United	1–1	Grimsby Town	Carlisle
19:00 GMT	Hayden (yellow card) 31'; Zanzala 90+3'	Report	John-Lewis 16'; Coke (yellow card) 55'	Stadium: Brunton Park; Attendance: 0 Referee: Chris Sarginson

13 March 2021 31	Carlisle United	3–1	Bradford City	Carlisle
19:00 GMT	Bennett 37'; Zanzala 39', 56' (yellow card) 74'; Farman (yellow card) 79'; Alessandra (yellow card) 80'; Patrick (yellow card) 90'	Report	Watt (yellow card) 34'; P. O'Connor 64' (yellow card) 73'; Sutton (yellow card) 69'; Rowe (yellow card) 90+5'	Stadium: Brunton Park; Attendance: 0 Referee: Ollie Yates

16 March 2021 32	Mansfield Town	1–1	Carlisle United	Mansfield
19:00 GMT	McLaughlin 80'	Report	Dickenson (yellow card) 60'; Zanzala 66' (yellow card) 69'	Stadium: One Call Stadium; Referee: Michael Salisbury

20 March 2021 33	Stevenage	3–1	Carlisle United	Stevenage
13:00 GMT	Pett 23'; Norris 60'; Lines (yellow card) 64'; Read 71'	Report	McDonald (red card) 18'; Tanner (yellow card) 45+2'; Guy (yellow card) 45+2'; Dickenson 55'	Stadium: Lamex Stadium; Referee: Brett Huxtable

23 March 2021 34	Carlisle United	0–1	Leyton Orient	Carlisle
18:30 GMT		Report	Wilkinson 88'	Stadium: Brunton Park; Attendance: 0 Referee: James Bell

27 March 2021 35	Carlisle United	1–2	Cambridge United	Carlisle
15:00 GMT	Hayden (yellow card) 24'; Furman (yellow card) 28'; Zanzala (yellow card) 68'; Alessandra 78'	Report	Mullin 45+2'; May 90'	Stadium: Brunton Park; Attendance: 0 Referee: Tom Nield

30 March 2021 36	Carlisle United	2–0	Crawley Town	Carlisle
19:00 GMT	Riley 17'; Patrick 33'; Guy (yellow card) 77'	Report	McNerney (yellow card) 66'; Craig (yellow card) 81'	Stadium: Brunton Park; Attendance: 0 Referee: Gary Hilton

3 April 2021 37	Southend United	0–2	Carlisle United	Southend
15:00 BST	Taylor (yellow card) 38'	Report	Zanzala 17'; McDonald (yellow card) 31'; Touré 79'	Stadium: Roots Hall; Attendance: 0 Referee: Alan Young

6 April 2021 38	Carlisle United	2–0	Scunthorpe United	Carlisle
15:00 BST	Mellish 60', 62'	Report	Loft (yellow card) 45+1'	Stadium: Brunton Park; Attendance: 0 Referee: Sam Barrott

10 April 2021 39	Barrow	2–2	Carlisle United	Barrow
15:00 BST	Quigley 19' (yellow card) 73'; Brough 24'; Eardley (yellow card) 25'	Report	Armer 3' (yellow card) 30'; Tanner (yellow card) 52'; Mellish (yellow card) 66'; Zanzala 79' (pen.)	Stadium: Holker Street; Attendance: 0 Referee: Seb Stockbridge

13 April 2021 40	Newport County	0–0	Carlisle United	Newport
19:00 BST	Dolan (yellow card) 55'	Report	Alessandra (yellow card) 24'; Mellish (yellow card) 70'	Stadium: Rodney Parade; Attendance: 0 Referee: Lee Swabey

17 April 2021 41	Carlisle United	0–0	Port Vale	Carlisle
12:30 BST	Touré (yellow card) 86'	Report	Worrall (yellow card) 52'	Stadium: Brunton Park; Attendance: 0 Referee: Peter Wright

20 April 2021 42	Bolton Wanderers	1–0	Carlisle United	Horwich
19:00 BST	Doyle 28'; Santos (yellow card) 61'	Report	Riley (yellow card) 56'	Stadium: University of Bolton Stadium; Attendance: 0 Referee: Martin Coy

24 April 2021 43	Carlisle United	1–1	Harrogate Town	Carlisle
15:00 BST	Guy (yellow card) 39'; Armer (yellow card) 40'; Kayode 75'	Report	Muldoon 11'	Stadium: Brunton Park; Attendance: 0 Referee: Chris Sarginson

27 April 2021 44	Cheltenham Town	1–1	Carlisle United	Cheltenham
19:00 BST	Hussey 56'	Report	Kayode 33'; Hayden (yellow card) 72'; Mellish (yellow card) 87'; Anderton (yellow card) 90+4'	Stadium: Whaddon Road Ground; Attendance: 0 Referee: Kevin Johnson

1 May 2021 45	Leyton Orient	2–3	Carlisle United	Leyton
15:00 BST	Wilkinson 3'; Happe (yellow card) 18'; Kemp 45+3'; Dennis (yellow card) 62'; Clay (yellow card) 89'	Report	Mellish 22' (yellow card) 89'; Alessandra 54' (pen.); Ethan Walker (yellow card) 80'; Tanner 90+1'	Stadium: Brisbane Road; Attendance: 0 Referee: Sam Allison

8 May 2021 46	Carlisle United	0–0	Walsall	Carlisle
15:00 BST		Report		Stadium: Brunton Park; Attendance: 0 Referee: Marc Edwards

=== FA Cup ===
The draw for the first round was made on Monday 26, October. The second round draw was revealed on Monday, 9 November by Danny Cowley.

Win Draw Loss

8 November 2020 First round	Hayes & Yeading United	2–2 (a.e.t.) (3–4 p)	Carlisle United	Hayes
12:45 GMT	Williams (yellow card) 17'; Rowe (yellow card) 40' (goal) 104'; McDevitt (yellow card) 72'; Sheppard (yellow card) 85'; Nasha 114'	Report	Patrick (yellow card) 9'; Furman (yellow card) 77'; Mellish 118', 120+1'	Stadium: SKYex Community Stadium; Attendance: 0 Referee: Ollie Yates
	Penalties
	Gafaiti (penalty scored); Williams (penalty missed); Nasha (penalty scored); Robinson (penalty missed); Rowe (penalty scored); McDevitt (penalty missed)		Mellish (penalty scored); Anderton (penalty scored); Alessandra (penalty missed); Tanner (penalty scored); Kayode (penalty missed); Reilly (penalty scored)

29 November 2020 Second round	Carlisle United	1–2	Doncaster Rovers	Carlisle
13:30 GMT	Kayode (yellow card) 43'; Mellish 78'	Report	Whiteman 32', 40'	Stadium: Brunton Park; Attendance: 0 Referee: Scott Oldham

=== EFL Cup ===
Win Draw Loss

The first round draw was made on 18 August, live on Sky Sports, by Paul Merson.

5 September 2020 First round	Oldham Athletic	3–0	Carlisle United	Oldham
15:00 BST	Garrity 29'; Grant 37'; McAleny 89'; Da Silva (yellow card) 90+2'	Report	Anderton (yellow card) 53'; McDonald (yellow card) 67'; Hayden (yellow card) 90+1'	Stadium: Boundary Park; Attendance: 0 Referee: Carl Boyeson

=== EFL Trophy ===
Win Draw Loss

The regional group stage draw was confirmed on 18 August.

Pos	Div	Team	Pld	W	PW	PL	L	GF	GA	GD	Pts	Qualification
1	L1	Fleetwood Town	3	3	0	0	0	8	2	+6	9	Advance to Round 2
2	L1	Sunderland	3	2	0	0	1	14	6	+8	6	Advance to Round 2
3	L2	Carlisle United	3	1	0	0	2	7	9	−2	3	
4	ACA	Aston Villa U21	3	0	0	0	3	2	14	−12	0	

Source: EFL.com

1 September 2020 Group stage	Carlisle United	1–3	Fleetwood Town	Carlisle
19:00 BST	Touré 36' (red card) 90'	Report	Camps 44'; Saunders 57', 68'	Stadium: Brunton Park; Attendance: 0 Referee: Ben Speedie

6 October 2020 Group stage	Sunderland	5–3	Carlisle United	Sunderland
19:00 BST	Maguire 26', 54'; Hume 37'; Wyke 69'; Diamond 90+1'	Report	Alessandra 6' (pen.); Mellish 72', 82'	Stadium: Stadium of Light; Attendance: 0 Referee: Bobby Madley

17 November 2020 Group stage	Carlisle United	3–1	Aston Villa U21	Carlisle
19:00 GMT	Obiero 32' (yellow card) 45+3'; Devine (yellow card) 38'; Touré 55'; Reilly 67'	Report	Farr (yellow card) 24'; Appiah (yellow card) 54'; Sohna 82'	Stadium: Brunton Park; Attendance: 0 Referee: Marc Edwards

== Transfers ==
=== Transfers in ===
Date	Position	Nationality	Name	From	Fee	Ref.
3 August 2020	CB	(England)	Rod McDonald	(England) AFC Wimbledon	Free transfer	
3 August 2020	RB	(England)	George Tanner	(England) Manchester United	Free transfer	
4 August 2020	CF	(Scotland)	Gavin Reilly	(England) Bristol Rovers	Free transfer	
5 August 2020	RB	(England)	Joe Riley	(England) Bradford City	Free transfer	
6 August 2020	LB	(Scotland)	Jack Armer	(England) Preston North End	Free transfer	
6 August 2020	CM	(England)	Danny Devine	(England) Bradford City	Free transfer	
7 August 2020	GK	(England)	Magnus Norman	(England) Fulham	Free transfer	
13 August 2020	LM	(England)	Brennan Dickenson	(England) Exeter City	Free transfer	
17 August 2020	GK	(England)	Paul Farman	(England) Stevenage	Free transfer	
18 August 2020	CF	(France)	Gime Touré	(England) Hartlepool United	Free transfer	
28 August 2020	CM	(South Africa)	Dean Furman	(South Africa) SuperSport United	Free transfer	
12 November 2020	CB	(England)	Rhys Bennett	(England) Peterborough United	Free transfer	
8 January 2021	CF	(Republic of the Congo)	Offrande Zanzala	(England) Crewe Alexandra	Free transfer	
20 January 2021	CB	(England)	Morgan Feeney	(England) Sunderland	Free transfer	
20 January 2021	CF	(England)	Cedwyn Scott	(England) Hebburn Town	Undisclosed	

=== Loans in ===
Date from	Position	Nationality	Name	From	Date until	Ref.
4 August 2020	CF	(Nigeria)	Joshua Kayode	(England) Rotherham United	End of season	
27 August 2020	GK	(England)	Marcus Dewhurst	(England) Sheffield United	End of season	
12 September 2020	CF	(England)	Ethan Walker	(England) Preston North End	8 January 2021	
2 October 2020	CM	(England)	Connor Malley	(England) Middlesbrough	1 January 2021	
16 October 2020	CF	(England)	Micah Obiero	(England) Huddersfield Town	1 January 2021	
23 January 2021	LW	(England)	Ethan Walker	(England) Preston North End	End of season	

=== Loans out ===
Date from	Position	Nationality	Name	To	Date until	Ref.
29 August 2020	RB	(England)	Charlie Barnes	(England) Kendal Town	1 January 2021	
29 August 2020	CB	(Scotland)	Liam Lightfoot	(England) Kendal Town	1 January 2021	
12 September 2020	LB	(England)	Charlie Birch	(England) Kendal Town	30 June 2021	
19 September 2020	GK	(England)	Isaac Robinson	(England) Workington	Work experience	
26 October 2020	CM	(Scotland)	Jamie Armstrong	(England) Kendal Town	January 2021	
26 December 2020	CB	(England)	Max Hunt	(England) Yeovil Town	January 2021	

=== Transfers out ===
Date	Position	Nationality	Name	To	Fee	Ref.
1 July 2020	GK	(England)	Adam Collin	(England) Kettering Town	Released	
1 July 2020	DM	(Nigeria)	Kelvin Etuhu	Retired	Released	
1 July 2020	GK	(Wales)	Louis Gray	(England) Chester	Released	
1 July 2020	LB	(Australia)	Jack Iredale	(England) Cambridge United	Released	
1 July 2020	CM	(England)	Mike Jones	(England) Barrow	Released	
1 July 2020	CF	(England)	Keighran Kerr	(England) Carlisle City	Released	
1 July 2020	CB	(England)	Nathaniel Knight-Percival	(England) Morecambe	Released	
1 July 2020	CF	(England)	Harry McKirdy	(England) Port Vale	Released	
1 July 2020	CM	(Somalia)	Mohammed Sagaf	(England) Dagenham & Redbridge	Released	
1 July 2020	AM	(Scotland)	Stefan Scougall	(Scotland) Alloa Athletic	Released	
4 August 2020	RB	(Wales)	Gethin Jones	(England) Bolton Wanderers	Rejected Contract	
7 September 2020	CB	(England)	Byron Webster	(England) Bromley	Rejected Contract	
5 January 2021	CF	(Scotland)	Gavin Reilly	(Scotland) Livingston	Mutual consent	
27 January 2021	CB	(England)	Max Hunt	(England) Yeovil Town	Undisclosed	
