= 2019–20 Carlisle United F.C. season =

Carlisle United
2019–20 season
- Chairman: Andrew Jenkins
- Head Coach: Steven Pressley (until 13 November); Chris Beech (from 26 November)
- Stadium: Brunton Park
- EFL League Two: 18th
- FA Cup: Third round
- EFL Cup: Second round
- EFL Trophy: Group stage
- Top goalscorer: League: Harry McKirdy; Olufela Olomola; Nathan Thomas (5 each); All: Harry McKirdy (11)
- Highest home attendance: 6,039 vs Bradford City, 26 December 2019
- Lowest home attendance: 893 vs Wolverhampton Wanderers U21s, 24 September 2019
Home colours	Away colours

The 2019–20 season was Carlisle United's 115th season in their history and their sixth consecutive season in League Two. Along with League Two, the club also participated in the FA Cup, EFL Cup and EFL Trophy.

The season covered the period from 1 July 2019 to 30 June 2020.

== Squad statistics ==
As of 10 March 2020

No.	Pos	Nat	Player	Total		League Two		FA Cup		League Cup		EFL Trophy	
No.	Pos	Nat	Player	Apps	Goals	Apps	Goals	Apps	Goals	Apps	Goals	Apps	Goals
1	GK	(England) ENG	Adam Collin	44	0	37+0	0	5+0	0	2+0	0	0+0	0
2	DF	(England) ENG	Christie Elliott (transferred)	22	1	13+3	1	0+1	0	2+0	0	3+0	0
3	DF	(Australia) AUS	Jack Iredale	30	2	18+4	2	3+0	0	2+0	0	3+0	0
4	MF	(Ireland) EIR	Canice Carroll (loan completed)	14	1	5+3	0	2+0	0	0+1	0	3+0	1
5	DF	(England) ENG	Jon Mellish	22	0	13+2	0	3+1	0	0+0	0	3+0	0
6	DF	(England) ENG	Aaron Hayden	24	3	18+0	2	3+0	1	0+1	0	1+1	0
7	MF	(England) ENG	Nathan Thomas	41	9	31+2	5	5+0	3	2+0	1	0+1	0
8	MF	(England) ENG	Mike Jones	44	1	37+0	0	4+0	1	3+0	0	0+0	0
9	FW	(England) ENG	Lewis Alessandra	10	1	10+0	1	0+0	0	0+0	0	0+0	0
9	FW	(Barbados) BRB	Hallam Hope (sold)	30	3	13+10	2	3+1	0	1+1	0	1+0	1
10	MF	(Scotland) SCO	Stefan Scougall	27	2	14+6	2	3+1	0	2+0	0	1+0	0
11	FW	(England) ENG	Harry McKirdy	38	11	21+7	5	3+2	5	1+1	1	1+2	0
12	DF	(Scotland) SCO	Elliot Watt	14	1	12+0	1	1+1	0	0+0	0	0+0	0
14	DF	(Wales) WAL	Gethin Jones	37	0	30+0	0	5+0	0	0+0	0	1+1	0
15	MF	(England) ENG	Taylor Charters	9	0	0+7	0	0+2	0	0+0	0	0+0	0
17	DF	(England) ENG	Byron Webster	39	1	32+0	1	5+0	0	2+0	0	0+0	0
19	MF	(England) ENG	Jack Bridge	34	3	20+8	0	1+0	1	2+0	2	2+1	0
20	FW	(England) ENG	Keighran Kerr	0	0	0+0	0	0+0	0	0+0	0	0+0	0
21	MF	(Nigeria) NGA	Kelvin Etuhu	0	0	0+0	0	0+0	0	0+0	0	0+0	0
22	GK	(Wales) WAL	Louis Gray	3	0	0+0	0	0+0	0	0+0	0	3+0	0
23	FW	(Nigeria) NGA	Joshua Kayode	5	3	3+2	3	0+0	0	0+0	0	0+0	0
23	DF	(England) ENG	Jarrad Branthwaite (sold)	14	1	9+0	0	2+0	0	0+0	0	3+0	1
24	FW	(England) ENG	Olufela Olomola	33	6	14+13	5	2+1	1	1+1	0	0+1	0
25	FW	(England) ENG	Ryan Loft	34	5	9+17	3	2+2	0	1+0	0	3+0	2
27	DF	(England) ENG	Nathaniel Knight-Percival	19	0	14+1	0	0+1	0	2+0	0	1+0	0
28	MF	(Somalia) SOM	Mohammed Ali Sagaf	19	1	11+6	1	0+0	0	0+0	0	1+1	0
29	DF	(England) ENG	Charlie Birch	1	0	0+1	0	0+0	0	0+0	0	0+0	0
31	FW	(Denmark) DEN	Elias Sørensen (loan completed)	11	0	1+7	0	0+0	0	0+1	0	2+0	0
33	DF	(England) ENG	Max Hunt	4	0	3+1	0	0+0	0	0+0	0	0+0	0
34	DF	(England) ENG	Nick Anderton	10	2	10+0	2	0+0	0	0+0	0	0+0	0
39	DF	(England) ENG	Callum Guy	3	0	2+1	0	0+0	0	0+0	0	0+0	0
40	FW	(England) ENG	Omari Patrick	7	2	6+1	2	0+0	0	0+0	0	0+0	0

=== Top scorers ===
Place	Position	Nation	Number	Name	League Two	FA Cup	League Cup	EFL Trophy	Total
1	FW	(England)	11	Harry McKirdy	5	5	1	0	11
2	MF	(England)	7	Nathan Thomas	5	3	1	0	9
3	FW	(England)	24	Olufela Olomola	5	1	0	0	6
4	MF	(England)	25	Ryan Loft	3	0	0	2	5
5	FW	(England)	19	Jack Bridge	0	1	2	0	3
5	DF	(England)	6	Aaron Hayden	2	1	0	0	3
5	FW	(Barbados)	9	Hallam Hope	2	0	0	1	3
5	FW	(Nigeria)	23	Joshua Kayode	3	0	0	0	3
9	DF	(England)	34	Nick Anderton	2	0	0	0	2
9	DF	(Australia)	3	Jack Iredale	2	0	0	0	2
9	FW	(England)	40	Omari Patrick	2	0	0	0	2
9	MF	(Scotland)	10	Stefan Scougall	2	0	0	0	2
13	FW	(England)	9	Lewis Alessandra	1	0	0	0	1
13	DF	(England)	23	Jarrad Branthwaite	0	0	0	1	1
13	MF	(England)	4	Canice Carroll	0	0	0	1	1
13	MF	(England)	2	Christie Elliott	1	0	0	0	1
13	MF	(England)	8	Mike Jones	0	1	0	0	1
13	MF	(Somalia)	28	Mohammed Ali Sagaf	1	0	0	0	1
13	DF	(Scotland)	12	Elliot Watt	1	0	0	0	1
13	DF	(England)	17	Byron Webster	1	0	0	0	1
Own goals					1	0	0	0	1
				TOTALS	39	11	4	5	59

Up

=== Disciplinary record ===
Position	Nation	Number	Name	League Two		FA Cup		League Cup		EFL Trophy		Total	
Position	Nation	Number	Name	Booked	Sent off (straight red)	Booked	Sent off (straight red)	Booked	Sent off (straight red)	Booked	Sent off (straight red)	Booked	Sent off (straight red)
MF	(England)	4	Canice Carroll	4	1	0	0	0	0	2	0	6	2
DF	(England)	6	Aaron Hayden	7	1	0	0	0	0	0	0	7	1
MF	(England)	19	Jack Bridge	1	1	0	0	0	0	0	0	1	1
DF	(England)	17	Byron Webster	10	0	1	0	0	0	0	0	11	0
DF	(England)	25	Ryan Loft	6	0	1	0	0	0	0	0	7	0
DF	(England)	34	Nick Anderton	5	0	0	0	0	0	0	0	5	0
FW	(England)	7	Harry McKirdy	3	0	2	0	0	0	0	0	5	0
MF	(England)	7	Nathan Thomas	4	0	1	0	0	0	0	0	5	0
DF	(Australia)	3	Jack Iredale	4	0	0	0	0	0	0	0	4	0
MF	(England)	8	Mike Jones	3	0	1	0	0	0	0	0	4	0
DF	(England)	24	Nathaniel Knight-Percival	4	0	0	0	0	0	0	0	4	0
DF	(Wales)	14	Gethin Jones	3	0	0	0	0	0	0	0	3	0
MF	(Somalia)	28	Mohammed Ali Sagaf	3	0	0	0	0	0	0	0	3	0
MF	(Scotland)	10	Stefan Scougall	3	0	0	0	0	0	0	0	3	0
DF	(Scotland)	12	Elliot Watt	3	0	0	0	0	0	0	0	3	0
DF	(England)	23	Jarrad Branthwaite	2	0	0	0	0	0	0	0	2	0
FW	(Barbados)	9	Hallam Hope	1	0	1	0	0	0	0	0	2	0
MF	(England)	15	Taylor Charters	1	0	0	0	0	0	0	0	1	0
DF	(England)	2	Christie Elliott	1	0	0	0	0	0	0	0	1	0
DF	(England)	5	Jon Mellish	0	0	0	0	0	0	1	0	1	0
MF	(England)	24	Olufela Olomola	1	0	0	0	0	0	0	0	1	0
			TOTALS	67	3	7	0	0	0	3	0	77	3

== Pre-season ==
On 15 June 2019, The Cumbrians announced their pre-season schedule.

9 July 2019 Friendly	Carlisle United	3–4	Hibernian	Carlisle
19:45 BST	Bridge 30'; Hope 47'; McGregor 67' (o.g.)	Report	Kamberi 37'; Allan 73'; Doidge 86'; Campbell 90'	Stadium: Brunton Park; Attendance: 2,631; Referee: Anthony Backhouse

13 July 2019 Friendly	Penrith	0–4	Carlisle United	Penrith
15:00 BST		Report	Hope 1'; Buckley 37'; Kerr 47'; Galloway 64'	Stadium: Frenchfields Stadium; Attendance: 675; Referee: Jim Halliday

16 July 2019 Friendly	Chester	0–0	Carlisle United	Chester
19:30 BST		Report		Stadium: Swansway Chester Stadium; Attendance: 598; Referee: Ed Duckworth

20 July 2019 Friendly	Carlisle United	1–3	Fleetwood Town	Carlisle
15:00 BST	Bridge 10'	Report	Madden 41' (pen.), 69'; Biggins 58'	Stadium: Brunton Park; Attendance: 1,620; Referee: Anthony Backhouse

23 July 2019 Friendly	Carlisle United	3–0	Tranmere Rovers	Carlisle
19:30 BST	Thomas 20', 40'; Bell 69'	Report		Stadium: Brunton Park; Attendance: 1,015; Referee: Anthony Backhouse

27 July 2019 Friendly	Ross County	2–0	Carlisle United	Dingwall, Scotland
15:00 BST	Power 52'; Vigurs 74'	Report		Stadium: Global Energy Stadium; Attendance: 735; Referee: Steven McLean

== Competitions ==
=== League Two ===
==== League table ====
Pos	Team	Pld	W	D	L	GF	GA	GD	Pts	PPG
14	Newport County	36	12	10	14	32	39	−7	46	1.28
15	Grimsby Town	37	12	11	14	45	51	−6	47	1.27
16	Cambridge United	37	12	9	16	40	48	−8	45	1.22
17	Leyton Orient	36	10	12	14	47	55	−8	42	1.17
18	Carlisle United	37	10	12	15	39	56	−17	42	1.14
19	Oldham Athletic	37	9	14	14	44	57	−13	41	1.11
20	Scunthorpe United	37	10	10	17	44	56	−12	40	1.08
21	Mansfield Town	36	9	11	16	48	55	−7	38	1.06
22	Morecambe	37	7	11	19	35	60	−25	32	0.86

Source: EFL Official Website
Rules for classification: 1) Points per game; 2) Goal difference; 3) Number of goals scored; 4) Head-to-head results; 5) Wins; 6) Away goals; 7) Penalty points (sec 9.5); 8) 12-point sending off offences

==== Results summary ====
Overall								Home						Away					
Pld	W	D	L	GF	GA	GD	Pts	W	D	L	GF	GA	GD	W	D	L	GF	GA	GD
37	10	12	15	39	56	−17	42	5	7	7	17	26	−9	5	5	8	22	30	−8

Last updated: 10 March 2020.
Source: BBC

==== Results by matchday ====
Matchday	1	2	3	4	5	6	7	8	9	10	11	12	13	14	15	16	17	18	19	20	21	22	23	24	25	26	27	28	29	30	31	32	33	34	35	36	37
Ground	H	A	H	A	H	A	H	A	H	A	H	A	H	A	H	A	H	A	H	A	H	A	H	A	A	H	A	H	A	A	H	H	A	H	A	H	H
Result	W	L	L	L	D	W	L	W	D	L	W	L	L	L	L	D	W	L	D	D	D	L	D	W	L	L	D	W	W	D	D	L	D	D	W	L	W
Position	5	10	18	20	21	18	19	15	17	18	16	18	20	20	21	20	19	20	21	22	21	21	21	19	21	21	21	21	19	20	20	20	21	20	20	20	18

Updated to match(es) played on 10 March 2020. Source: Statto.com
A = Away; H = Home; W = Win; D = Draw; L = Loss

==== Matches ====
On Thursday, 20 June 2019, the EFL League Two fixtures were revealed.

3 August 2019 1	Carlisle United	2–1	Crawley Town	Carlisle
15:00 BST	McKirdy 6'; Scougall 32'	Report	Lubala 16'	Stadium: Brunton Park; Attendance: 4,833; Referee: James Oldham

10 August 2019 2	Swindon Town	3–2	Carlisle United	Swindon
15:00 BST	Yates 56'; Fryers 70'; Woolery 90'	Report	Olomola 52'; Sagaf 90+2'	Stadium: County Ground (Swindon); Attendance: 7,024; Referee: Nick Kinseley

17 August 2019 3	Carlisle United	0–2	Mansfield Town	Carlisle
15:00 BST		Report	Rose 29'; Maynard 45+4'	Stadium: Brunton Park; Attendance: 4,576; Referee: Carl Boyeson

20 August 2019 4	Cheltenham Town	2–0	Carlisle United	Cheltenham
19:45 BST	Reilly 15'; Varney 45'	Report		Stadium: Jonny-Rocks Stadium; Attendance: 2,634; Referee: Will Finnie

24 August 2019 5	Carlisle United	2–2	Salford City	Carlisle
15:00 BST	Olomola 7'; Scougall 43'	Report	Dieseruvwe 28'; Whitehead 33' (pen.)	Stadium: Brunton Park; Attendance: 4,806; Referee: Paul Marsden

31 August 2019 6	Scunthorpe United	0–1	Carlisle United	Scunthorpe
15:00 BST		Report	Loft 60'	Stadium: Sands Venue Stadium; Attendance: 3,359; Referee: Sam Purkiss

7 September 2019 7	Carlisle United	1–3	Exeter City	Carlisle
15:00 BST	Olomola 61'	Report	L. Martin 36'; A. Martin 67'; Law 90+1'	Stadium: Brunton Park; Attendance: 4,167; Referee: Jeremy Simpson

14 September 2019 8	Stevenage	2–3	Carlisle United	Stevenage
15:00 BST	Guthrie 25', 54'	Report	McKirdy 38', 83'; Thomas 52'	Stadium: Broadhall Way; Attendance: 2,616; Referee: Martin Coy

17 September 2019 9	Carlisle United	0–0	Forest Green Rovers	Carlisle
19:45 BST		Report		Stadium: Brunton Park; Attendance: 3,219; Referee: Michael Salisbury

21 September 2019 10	Bradford City	3–1	Carlisle United	Bradford
15:00 BST	Pritchard 30'; Mellor 40'; Zeli Ismail 90+5'	Report	Olomola 14'	Stadium: Northern Commercials Stadium; Attendance: 14,217; Referee: John Busby

28 September 2019 11	Carlisle United	1–0	Oldham Athletic	Carlisle
15:00 BST	Olomola 3'	Report		Stadium: Brunton Park; Attendance: 4,321; Referee: Marc Edwards

5 October 2019 12	Newport County	1–0	Carlisle United	Newport
15:00 BST	Nurse 90+6'	Report		Stadium: Rodney Parade; Attendance: 3,681; Referee: Antony Coggins

12 October 2019 13	Carlisle United	2–4	Crewe Alexandra	Carlisle
15:00 BST	Hope 59'; Elliott 64'	Report	Hunt 7'; Powell 27'; Porter 76'; Jones 83' (o.g.)	Stadium: Brunton Park; Attendance: 4,521; Referee: Darren England

19 October 2019 14	Plymouth Argyle	2–0	Carlisle United	Plymouth
15:00 BST	Grant 22'; Sarcevic 90+2'	Report		Stadium: Home Park; Attendance: 8,446; Referee: Alan Young

22 October 2019 15	Carlisle United	0–2	Northampton Town	Carlisle
19:45 BST		Report	Pollock 51'; Hoskins 90+2'	Stadium: Brunton Park; Attendance: 3,324; Referee: Scott Oldham

26 October 2019 16	Leyton Orient	1–1	Carlisle United	Leyton
15:00 BST	Wright 7' (pen.)	Report	Iredale 48'	Stadium: The Breyer Group Stadium; Attendance: 5,756; Referee: David Rock

2 November 2019 17	Carlisle United	2–1	Macclesfield Town	Carlisle
15:00 BST	McKirdy 45+2'; Loft 82'	Report	Archibald 25'	Stadium: Brunton Park; Attendance: 3,880; Referee: Andy Haines

16 November 2019 18	Port Vale	2–1	Carlisle United	Burslem
15:00 GMT	Worrall 60'; Cullen 83'	Report	Loft 1'	Stadium: Vale Park; Attendance: 4,783; Referee: Martin Coy

23 November 2019 19	Carlisle United	0–0	Cambridge United	Carlisle
15:00 GMT		Report		Stadium: Brunton Park; Attendance: 4,041; Referee: Sebastian Stockbridge

7 December 2019 20	Morecambe	1–1	Carlisle United	Morecambe
15:00 GMT	O'Sullivan 50'	Report	Hope 47'	Stadium: Globe Arena; Attendance: 3,126; Referee: Darren Handley

14 December 2019 21	Carlisle United	0–0	Grimsby Town	Carlisle
15:00 GMT		Report		Stadium: Brunton Park; Attendance: 3,653; Referee: Marc Edwards

21 December 2019 22	Colchester	3–0	Carlisle United	Colchester
15:00 GMT	Knight-Percival 26' (o.g.); Harriott 41'; Bramall 52'	Report		Stadium: Colchester Community Stadium; Attendance: 3,164; Referee: Craig Hicks

26 December 2019 23	Carlisle United	0–0	Bradford City	Carlisle
15:00 GMT		Report		Stadium: Brunton Park; Attendance: 6,039; Referee: Leigh Doughty

29 December 2019 24	Walsall	1–2	Carlisle United	Bescot
15:00 GMT	Adebayo 70'	Report	Thomas 52'; McKirdy 90+4'	Stadium: Banks's Stadium; Attendance: 4,794; Referee: Ben Toner

1 January 2020 25	Crewe Alexandra	4–1	Carlisle United	Crewe
15:00 GMT	Ainley 17'; Powell 26', 31'; Anene 34'	Report	Iredale 56'	Stadium: Gresty Road; Attendance: 4,316; Referee: John Busby

12 January 2020 26	Carlisle United	0–3	Plymouth Argyle	Carlisle
15:00 GMT		Report	Jephcott 33', 49'; Hardie 75'	Stadium: Brunton Park; Attendance: 4,212; Referee: Martin Coy

18 January 2020 27	Oldham Athletic	1–1	Carlisle United	Oldham
15:00 GMT	Smith 42'	Report	Webster 25'	Stadium: Boundary Park; Attendance: 3,977; Referee: Robert Lewis

25 January 2020 28	Carlisle United	2–1	Walsall	Carlisle
15:00 GMT	Anderton 21'; Roberts 43' (o.g.)	Report	Sadler 50'	Stadium: Brunton Park; Attendance: 4,097; Referee: James Oldham

28 January 2020 29	Forest Green Rovers	1–4	Carlisle United	Nailsworth
19:45 GMT	Winchester 59' (pen.)	Report	Thomas 24', 26', 47' (pen.); Kayode 49'	Stadium: The New Lawn; Attendance: 1,514; Referee: Brett Huxtable

1 February 2020 30	Mansfield Town	2–2	Carlisle United	Mansfield
15:00 GMT	Maynard 58', 72'	Report	Watt 81'; Kayode 90+3'	Stadium: Field Mill; Attendance: 4,272; Referee: Jarred Gillett

8 February 2020 31	Carlisle United	1–1	Swindon Town	Carlisle
15:00 GMT	Hayden 62'	Report	Edmonds-Green 11'	Stadium: Brunton Park; Attendance: 4,620; Referee: Graham Salisbury

11 February 2020 32	Carlisle United	0–1	Cheltenham Town	Carlisle
19:45 GMT		Report	Reid 26'	Stadium: Brunton Park; Attendance: 3,088; Referee: Andy Haines

15 February 2020 33	Crawley Town	0–0	Carlisle United	Crawley
15:00 GMT		Report		Stadium: Broadfield Stadium; Attendance: 2,114; Referee: David Rock

22 February 2020 34	Carlisle United	2–2	Morecambe	Carlisle
19:45 GMT	Patrick 45'; Hayden 65'	Report	Stockton 18'; Wildig 24'	Stadium: Brunton Park; Attendance: 4,679; Referee: Peter Wright

29 February 2020 35	Cambridge United	1–2	Carlisle United	Cambridge
15:00 GMT	Lambe 82'	Report	Alessandra 27'; Anderton 73'	Stadium: Abbey Stadium; Attendance: 4,122; Referee: Charles Breakspear

7 March 2020 36	Carlisle United	0–3	Colchester United	Carlisle
15:00 GMT		Report	Poku 41', 59'; Norris 43'	Stadium: Brunton Park; Attendance: 3,769; Referee: Thomas Bramall

10 March 2020 37	Carlisle United	2–0	Newport County	Carlisle
19:45 GMT	Patrick 5'; Kayode 33' (pen.); Hayden (yellow card) 45'; Anderton (yellow card) 57'	Report	Gorman (yellow card) 32'; Inniss (red card) 44'	Stadium: Brunton Park; Attendance: 2,822; Referee: Graham Salisbury

14 March 2020	Grimsby Town	v	Carlisle United	Cleethorpes
15:00 GMT				Stadium: Blundell Park
Note: Season was suspended until 3 April 2020, due to the COVID-19 pandemic.

17 March 2020	Northampton Town	v	Carlisle United	Northampton
19:45 GMT				Stadium: PTS Academy Stadium
Note: Season was suspended until 3 April 2020, due to the COVID-19 pandemic.

21 March 2020	Carlisle United	v	Leyton Orient	Carlisle
15:00 GMT				Stadium: Brunton Park
Note: Season was suspended until 3 April 2020, due to the COVID-19 pandemic.

28 March 2020	Macclesfield Town	v	Carlisle United	Macclesfield
15:00 GMT				Stadium: Moss Rose
Note: Season was suspended until 3 April 2020, due to the COVID-19 pandemic.

4 April 2020	Carlisle United	v	Port Vale	Carlisle
15:00 BST				Stadium: Brunton Park
Note: On 3 April, the English Football League decided to postpone all football until safe to do so due to the COVID-19 pandemic.

10 April 2020	Salford City	v	Carlisle United	Salford
15:00 BST				Stadium: Peninsula Stadium
Note: On 3 April, the English Football League decided to postpone all football until safe to do so due to the COVID-19 pandemic.

13 April 2020	Carlisle United	v	Scunthorpe United	Carlisle
13:00 BST				Stadium: Brunton Park
Note: On 3 April, the English Football League decided to postpone all football until safe to do so due to the COVID-19 pandemic.

18 April 2020	Exeter City	v	Carlisle United	Exeter
15:00 BST				Stadium: St James Park
Note: On 3 April, the English Football League decided to postpone all football until safe to do so due to the COVID-19 pandemic.

25 April 2020	Carlisle United	v	Stevenage	Carlisle
15:00 BST				Stadium: Brunton Park
Note: On 3 April, the English Football League decided to postpone all football until safe to do so due to the COVID-19 pandemic.

=== FA Cup ===
The first round draw was made on 21 October 2019. The second round draw was made live on 11 November from Chichester City's stadium, Oaklands Park. The third round draw was made live on BBC Two from Etihad Stadium, where Micah Richards and Tony Adams conducted the draw.

8 November 2019 R1	Dulwich Hamlet	1–4	Carlisle United	East Dulwich
19:55 GMT	Smith 49'	Report	Olomola 8'; McKirdy 37', 86'; Jones 55'	Stadium: Champion Hill Stadium; Attendance: 3,336; Referee: James Oldham

30 November 2019 R2	Forest Green Rovers	2–2	Carlisle United	Nailsworth
15:00 GMT	Collins 11'; Stevens 78'	Report	Thomas 40', 76'	Stadium: The New Lawn; Attendance: 1,504; Referee: Trevor Kettle

10 December 2019 R2 Replay	Carlisle United	1–0	Forest Green Rovers	Carlisle
19:45 GMT	Hayden 41'	Report		Stadium: Brunton Park; Attendance: 1,736; Referee: Andy Haines

4 January 2020 R3	Cardiff City	2–2	Carlisle United	Cardiff, Wales
15:01 GMT	Paterson 50'; Whyte 55'	Report	Bridge 12'; McKirdy 45+2'	Stadium: Cardiff City Stadium; Attendance: 5,282; Referee: Geoff Eltringham

15 January 2020 R3 Replay	Carlisle United	3–4	Cardiff City	Carlisle
19:45 GMT	Thomas 7'; McKirdy 51', 64'	Report	Flint 18', 48'; Murphy 45'; Ward 57'	Stadium: Brunton Park; Attendance: 4,381; Referee: Darren Handley

=== EFL Cup ===
The first round draw was made on 20 June. The second round draw was made on 13 August 2019 following the conclusion of all but one first-round matches.

13 August 2019 R1	Barnsley	0–3	Carlisle United	Barnsley
19:45 BST		Report	McKirdy 24'; Bridge 58' (pen.); Thomas 64'	Stadium: Oakwell; Attendance: 5,208; Referee: Ben Toner

27 August 2019 R2	Rochdale	2–1	Carlisle United	Rochdale
19:45 BST	Morley 11'; Done 31'	Report	Bridge 71' (pen.)	Stadium: Crown Oil Arena; Attendance: 1,974; Referee: Peter Wright

=== EFL Trophy ===
On 9 July 2019, the pre-determined group stage draw was announced with Invited clubs to be drawn on 12 July 2019.

Pos	Div	Team	Pld	W	PW	PL	L	GF	GA	GD	Pts	Qualification
1	L1	Blackpool	3	2	0	0	1	7	3	+4	6	Advance to Round 2
2	ACA	Wolverhampton Wanderers U21	3	1	1	0	1	6	5	+1	5	Advance to Round 2
3	L2	Morecambe	3	1	0	1	1	6	8	−2	4	
4	L2	Carlisle United	3	1	0	0	2	5	8	−3	3	

Source: EFL.com

24 September 2019 Group stage	Carlisle United	2–4	Wolverhampton Wanderers U21s	Carlisle
19:45 BST	Hope 35'; Loft 45'	Report	Ashley-Seal 19', 47' (pen.), 64'; Dai Wai-tsun 39'	Stadium: Brunton Park; Attendance: 893; Referee: Seb Stockbridge

15 October 2019 Group stage	Carlisle United	2–1	Blackpool	Carlisle
19:45 BST	Loft 45+2'; Carroll 87'	Report	Gray 25' (o.g.)	Stadium: Brunton Park; Attendance: 911; Referee: Darren Handley

12 November 2019 Group stage	Morecambe	3–1	Carlisle United	Morecambe
19:45 GMT	Tutte 61' (pen.); Wildig 67'; Conlan 90+1'	Report	Branthwaite 26'	Stadium: Globe Arena; Attendance: 803; Referee: Graham Salisbury

Carlisle United eliminated from EFL Trophy

== Transfers ==
=== Transfers in ===
Date	Position	Nationality	Name	From	Fee	Ref.
1 July 2019	LM	(England)	Jack Bridge	(England) Northampton Town	Free transfer	
1 July 2019	RB	(England)	Christie Elliott	(Scotland) Partick Thistle	Free transfer	
1 July 2019	CB	(Australia)	Jack Iredale	(Scotland) Greenock Morton	Free transfer	
1 July 2019	CF	(England)	Harry McKirdy	(England) Aston Villa	Free transfer	
1 July 2019	CB	(England)	Jon Mellish	(England) Gateshead	Free transfer	
1 July 2019	CB	(England)	Byron Webster	(England) Scunthorpe United	Free transfer	
4 July 2019	CB	(England)	Nathaniel Knight-Percival	(England) Bradford City	Free transfer	
29 July 2019	CB	(England)	Aaron Hayden	(England) Wolverhampton Wanderers	Free transfer	
3 August 2019	AM	(Somalia)	Mohammed Ali Sagaf	(England) Braintree Town	Free transfer	
13 September 2019	RB	(Wales)	Gethin Jones	(England) Fleetwood Town	Free transfer	
10 January 2020	CB	(England)	Max Hunt	(England) Derby County	Undisclosed	
16 January 2020	LB	(England)	Nick Anderton	(England) Blackpool	Free transfer	
24 January 2020	RW	(England)	Lewis Alessandra	(England) Morecambe	Free transfer	
30 January 2020	CM	(England)	Callum Guy	(England) Blackpool	Undisclosed	
31 January 2020	CF	(England)	Omari Patrick	(England) Bradford City	Undisclosed	

=== Loans in ===
Date from	Position	Nationality	Name	From	Date until	Ref.
24 July 2019	LW	(England)	Nathan Thomas	(England) Sheffield United	30 June 2020	
29 July 2019	CF	(England)	Olufela Olomola	(England) Scunthorpe United	30 June 2020	
1 August 2019	RB	(Republic of Ireland)	Canice Carroll	(England) Brentford	31 January 2020	
2 August 2019	CF	(England)	Ryan Loft	(England) Leicester City	30 June 2020	
16 August 2019	CF	(Denmark)	Elias Sørensen	(England) Newcastle United	20 December 2019	
1 January 2020	CM	(Scotland)	Elliot Watt	(England) Wolverhampton Wanderers	30 June 2020	
15 January 2020	CF	(Nigeria)	Joshua Kayode	(England) Rotherham United	30 June 2020	
31 January 2020	GK	(England)	Marcus Dewhurst	(England) Sheffield United	30 June 2020	

=== Loans out ===
Date from	Position	Nationality	Name	To	Date until	Ref.
28 November 2019	MF	(England)	Taylor Charters	(England) Workington	December 2019	
9 January 2020	FW	(England)	Keighran Kerr	(England) Kendal Town	30 June 2020	
28 February 2020	GK	(Wales)	Louis Gray	(England) Chester	27 March 2020	

=== Transfers out ===
Date	Position	Nationality	Name	To	Fee	Ref.
1 July 2019	CF	(England)	Richie Bennett	(England) Port Vale	Released	
1 July 2019	AM	(Republic of Ireland)	Jamie Devitt	(England) Blackpool	Free transfer	
1 July 2019	CB	(Republic of Ireland)	Anthony Gerrard	(England) Chesterfield	Released	
1 July 2019	CB	(England)	Macaulay Gillesphey	(Australia) Brisbane Roar	Mutual consent	
1 July 2019	DM	(England)	George Glendon	(England) Chester	Released	
1 July 2019	CF	(France)	Arthur Gnahoua	(England) Macclesfield Town	Released	
1 July 2019	LB	(England)	Danny Grainger	Retired		
1 July 2019	CB	(Scotland)	Peter Grant	(Scotland) Greenock Morton	Released	
1 July 2019	CM	(England)	Jason Kennedy	(England) Hartlepool United	Released	
1 July 2019	DM	(England)	Gary Liddle	(England) Walsall	Released	
1 July 2019	CF	(England)	Liam McCarron	(England) Leeds United	Undisclosed	
1 July 2019	RB	(Scotland)	Gary Miller	(Scotland) Falkirk	Released	
1 July 2019	CB	(England)	Tom Parkes	(England) Exeter City	Free transfer	
29 August 2019	MF	(Scotland)	Josh Galloway	(England) Leeds United	Undisclosed	
13 January 2020	CB	(England)	Jarrad Branthwaite	(England) Everton	Undisclosed	
22 January 2020	CF	(Barbados)	Hallam Hope	(England) Swindon Town	Undisclosed	
31 January 2020	RB	(England)	Christie Elliott	(Scotland) Dundee	Mutual consent	
