= Taylor Charters =

English footballer (born 2001)

Personal information
- Full name: Taylor Ryan Charters
- Date of birth: 2 October 2001 (age 25)
- Place of birth: Whitehaven, England
- Height: 6 ft 1 in (1.85 m)
- Positions: Central midfielder; left-back

Team information
- Current team: Queen of the South
- Number: 3

Youth career
- –2019: Carlisle United

Senior career*
Years	Team	Apps	(Gls)
2019–2025	Carlisle United	64	(3)
2019	→ Workington (loan)	2	(0)
2022	→ Gateshead (loan)	22	(4)
2025	→ Queen of the South (loan)	12	(0)
2025–	Queen of the South	31	(1)
- * Club domestic league appearances and goals as of 4 May 2026

Taylor Ryan Charters (born 2 October 2001) is an English professional footballer who plays as a Left Back or midfielder for Scottish League One club Queen of the South.

== Career ==
Born in Whitehaven, Charters signed a two-year contract with Carlisle United, his first professional contract, following a scholarship period at the club. He joined Northern Premier League Division One North West side Workington on a month-long loan in November 2019, and made 3 appearances for the club in all competitions. Charters made his senior debut for Carlisle on 1 January 2020 as a second-half substitute for Mohammed Sagaf in a 4–1 defeat away to Crewe Alexandra. He made a further 8 appearances for Carlisle in all competitions across the 2019–20 season, with Charters praised for his performances.

On 14 January 2022, he joined National League North club Gateshead on a month-long loan. This loan was later extended to the end of the season as Charters was part of the Gateshead squad that won the National League North title.

In May 2022, Charters signed a new one-year deal with Carlisle.

On 27 January 2025, Charters joined Scottish League One club Queen of the South on loan for the remainder of the season. On 30 May 2025, after a successful loan spell, Charters signed a two-year permanent deal with the Doonhamers.

== Career statistics ==
As of 27 January 2025

Appearances and goals by club, season and competition
Club	Season	League			National cup (Note: Includes FA Cup)		League cup (Note: Includes EFL Cup)		Other		Total	
Club	Season	Division	Apps	Goals	Apps	Goals	Apps	Goals	Apps	Goals	Apps	Goals
Carlisle United	2019–20	League Two	7	0	2	0	0	0	0	0	9	0
Carlisle United	2020–21	League Two	9	0	0	0	1	0	2 (Note: Appearance(s) in EFL Trophy)	0	12	0
Carlisle United	2021–22	League Two	9	0	2	0	1	0	5	1	17	1
Carlisle United	2022–23	League Two	11	1	2	0	0	0	6 (Note: 3 Appearances in EFL Trophy and 3 Appearances in play-offs)	0	19	1
Carlisle United	2023–24	League One	19	1	0	0	1	0	1	0	21	1
Carlisle United	2024–25	League Two	6	0	1	0	0	0	2	0	9	0
Carlisle United	Total		61	2	7	0	3	0	16	1	87	3
Workington (loan)	2019–20	NPL Division One North West	2	0	0	0	—		1 (Note: Appearance(s) in Northern Premier League Challenge Cup)	0	3	0
Gateshead (loan)	2021–22	National League North	21	4	0	0	—		0	0	21	4
Career total			75	6	6	0	3	0	15	1	115	7

== Honours ==
Carlisle United

- EFL League Two play-offs: 2023

Gateshead

- National League North: 2021–22
