= Daniel Devine =

Dan, Daniel or Danny Devine may refer to:

- Dan Devine (1924–2002), American Hall-of-Fame college football and National Football League head coach
- Danny Devine (footballer, born 1992), Irish professional footballer for Inverness Caledonian Thistle
- Danny Devine (footballer, born 1997), English professional footballer for Chester
