= Callum Guy =

English footballer (born 1996)

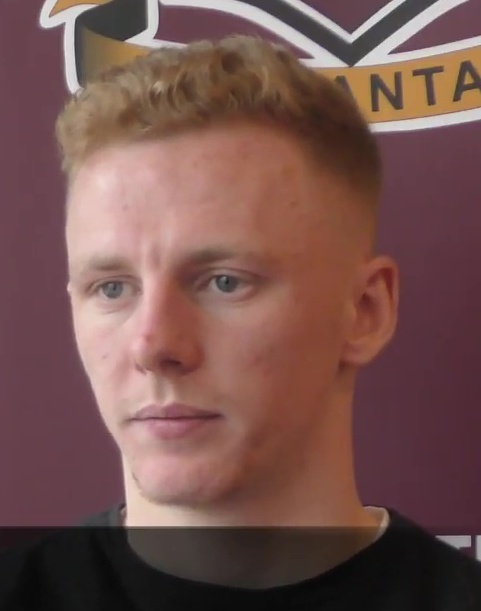
- Guy in 2018

Personal information
- Full name: Callum Anthony Guy
- Date of birth: 25 November 1996 (age 29)
- Place of birth: Nottingham, England
- Height: 5 ft 10 in (1.78 m)
- Position: Midfielder

Youth career
- 2006–2015: Derby County

Senior career*
Years	Team	Apps	(Gls)
2015–2019	Derby County	0	(0)
2017	→ Port Vale (loan)	11	(0)
2018	→ Bradford City (loan)	17	(0)
2018–2019	→ Blackpool (loan)	14	(0)
2019–2020	Blackpool	17	(0)
2020–2025	Carlisle United	161	(3)
2025	Notts Olympic	2	(1)
- * Club domestic league appearances and goals as of 15:53, 30 December 2025 (UTC)

Callum Anthony Guy (born 25 November 1996) is an English professional footballer who plays as a midfielder.

Guy started his career at Derby County before playing on loan at Port Vale during the 2016–17 season and joined Bradford City on loan in January 2018. In August 2018, he joined Blackpool in a deal made permanent in January 2019. He left Blackpool for Carlisle United in January 2020. He was voted the club's Player of the Year after picking up 14 assists in the 2020–21 season, at which point he was named as club captain. He helped Carlisle to win the EFL League Two play-offs in 2023 and made 179 appearances in all competitions over a five-year stay. He then went into non-League football with Notts Olympic.

== Career ==
=== Derby County ===
Guy came through the Derby County youth team from the age of nine to turn professional at the club in February 2015. He played all three Group Stage games for the under-23 team in the EFL Trophy during the 2016–17 season. He joined EFL League One club Port Vale on a half-season loan on 11 January 2017. Nine days later he was named as man of the match on his first-team debut for Port Vale in a 2–2 draw with Bury at Vale Park; his performance also saw him named in the Football League Paper's Team of the Week. Manager Michael Brown said, "I thought he mixed his game up well - short and long passes, broke it up, forward runs, wanting to do well". He was again named as Vale's man of the match after a shortage of defenders saw him play at right-back in a 2–1 home defeat to Bradford City on 25 February. However, he picked up a hamstring injury in mid-March, and was ruled out for the rest of the season.

Guy made his Derby debut on 12 September 2017, in a 3–2 defeat at Barnsley in the EFL Cup. On 12 January 2018, he returned to League One on loan at Bradford City on loan until the end of the 2017–18 season. "Bantams" boss Stuart McCall said that "[he will] give us a little bit extra depth. He is hungry enough, however, to want to push himself into the starting XI". It took until his tenth appearance for Bradford for him to be on the winning side, when he was named as man of the match during a 1–0 victory over Gillingham.

=== Blackpool ===
On 31 August 2018, Guy joined League One side Blackpool on a loan deal until the end of 2018, with the deal due to be made permanent in January 2019. At that point, he would sign an 18-month contract with the option of a further 12 months on top of that. He scored on his Seasiders debut with a 25 yards (23 m) volley in a 3–3 draw with Macclesfield Town in an EFL Trophy group stage game on 4 September. The permanent deal was confirmed on 2 January. He ended the 2018–19 season with 24 appearances to his name. On 27 November 2019, he was sent off after receiving two bookings in a 3–1 defeat to Scunthorpe United at Bloomfield Road.

=== Carlisle United ===
On 30 January 2020, Guy signed an 18-month deal with EFL League Two side Carlisle United after moving for an undisclosed fee. Carlisle head coach Chris Beech told the club website that Guy was a "marquee signing". However, he picked up a knee injury in his third appearance for the "Blues" and was ruled out of action for the rest of the 2019–20 season after undergoing surgery.

Guy made 47 appearances in the 2020–21 season, helping the "Cumbrians" to a tenth-place finish. He made a total of 14 assists, more than any other player in League Two. He signed a new one-year deal in April, with director of football David Holdsworth keen to extend the deal even further. Guy was voted Carlisle United Player of the Year by News and Star readers, attracting 46% of the vote from more than 750 fans. His success carried over into the club's awards as he picked up the main Player of the Year award.

Following the departure of captain Nick Anderton in July 2021, Guy was appointed club captain ahead of the 2021–22 season. He was a subject of interest for big-spending National League club Wrexham, but was praised by Beech for his commitment to Carlisle. He went on to sign a new deal at Carlisle in September to keep him at Brunton Park until summer 2023 (with a further 12-month option). However, Wrexham's interest continued into the January transfer window, forcing new head coach Keith Millen to deny reports that he would be forced to sell Guy. By March, Paul Simpson – yet another new head coach – confirmed that Guy had been ruled out for the rest of the 2021–22 season after suffering medial knee ligament damage.

He signed a new two-year deal, with an option, in March 2023. He made 52 appearances throughout the 2022–23 campaign, scoring four goals, including one in the play-off semi-final victory over Bradford City. Carlisle secured promotion by beating Stockport County on penalties in the final at Wembley Stadium; Guy played in the match, being substituted on 78 minutes. On 4 November 2023, he injured his Anterior cruciate ligament in a 3–1 defeat at Leyton Orient. He was ruled out of action for nine months. The club were relegated in his absence.

He returned to fitness in October 2024 after manager Paul Simpson's summer transfer business had left a spot open for him to return to the first XI as a holding midfielder, with Dylan McGeouch and Harrison Neal providing cover. He said his return was "bittersweet" as Carlisle were struggling at the foot of the League Two table. He was sidelined with illness over the new year, which head coach Mike Williamson said was a "really tough time" for the player. He played 21 games in the 2024–25 season as Carlisle were relegated into non-League football despite an upturn in results under new manager Mark Hughes. Guy was released upon the expiry of his contract.

=== Notts Olympic ===
Guy went on to play for amateur side Notts Olympic in the Nottinghamshire Senior League in October 2025.

== Style of play ==
Guy is an energetic 'box-to-box' midfielder.

== Personal life ==
Guy and his wife Abbie, have three children: Ava-Leigh (born in 2019), George (born in March 2021), and Lottie (born in June 2025).

== Career statistics ==
As of 30 December 2025

Appearances and goals by club, season and competition
Club	Season	League			FA Cup		EFL Cup		Other		Total	
Club	Season	Division	Apps	Goals	Apps	Goals	Apps	Goals	Apps	Goals	Apps	Goals
Derby County	2017–18	Championship	0	0	0	0	1	0	—		1	0
Derby County	2018–19	Championship	0	0	0	0	0	0	—		0	0
Derby County	Total		0	0	0	0	1	0	0	0	1	0
Derby County U23	2016–17	—			—		—		3 (Note: Appearance(s) in EFL Trophy)	0	3	0
Port Vale (loan)	2016–17	League One	11	0	—		—		—		11	0
Bradford City (loan)	2017–18	League One	17	0	—		—		—		17	0
Blackpool	2018–19	League One	16	0	3	0	2	0	3	1	24	1
Blackpool	2019–20	League One	15	0	3	0	0	0	4	0	22	0
Blackpool	Total		31	0	6	0	2	0	7	1	46	1
Carlisle United	2019–20	League Two	3	0	—		—		—		3	0
Carlisle United	2020–21	League Two	43	0	2	0	1	0	1	0	47	0
Carlisle United	2021–22	League Two	34	0	2	0	1	0	0	0	37	0
Carlisle United	2022–23	League Two	45	3	1	0	1	0	5 (Note: Two appearances in EFL Trophy, three appearances and 1 goal in League Two play-offs)	1	52	4
Carlisle United	2023–24	League One	16	0	1	0	1	0	1	0	19	0
Carlisle United	2024–25	League Two	20	0	0	0	0	0	1	0	21	0
Carlisle United	Total		161	3	6	0	4	0	8	1	179	4
Notts Olympic	2025–26	Nottinghamshire Senior League	2	1	0	0	—		0	0	2	1
Career total			222	4	12	0	7	0	18	2	259	6

== Honours ==
Carlisle United

- EFL League Two play-offs: 2023

Individual

- Carlisle United Player of the Year: 2020–21
