= Chris Beech (footballer, born 1974) =

English professional footballer

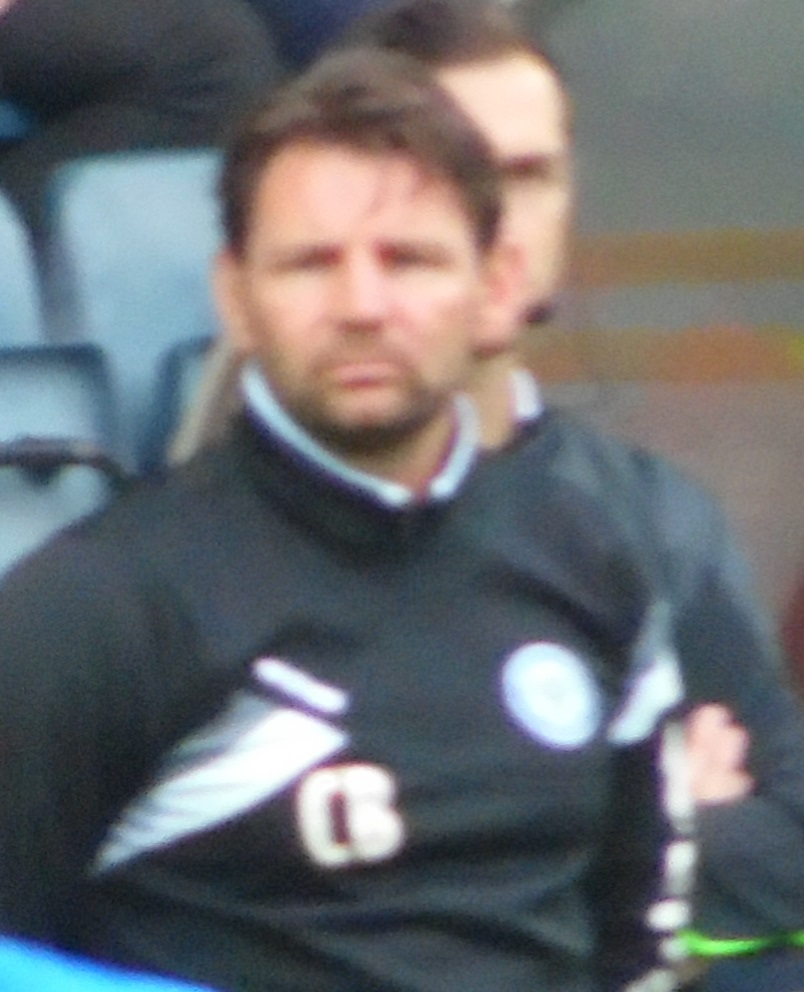
- Beech in July 2015

Personal information
- Full name: Christopher Stephen Beech
- Date of birth: 16 September 1974 (age 52)
- Place of birth: Blackpool, England
- Height: 5 ft 11 in (1.80 m)
- Position: Midfielder

Youth career
- 1990–1993: Blackpool

Senior career*
Years	Team	Apps	(Gls)
1993–1996	Blackpool	97	(6)
1996–1998	Hartlepool United	104	(27)
1998–2002	Huddersfield Town	81	(15)
2002–2004	Rochdale	35	(2)
Total		317	(50)

Managerial career
- 2011–2012: Rochdale (caretaker)
- 2019–2021: Carlisle United
- 2023–2024: AFC Fylde
- * Club domestic league appearances and goals

Christopher Stephen Beech (born 16 September 1974) is an English former professional footballer, manager, and coach. He is currently the Head of Recruitment at National League club Hartlepool United.

== Playing career ==
Beech began his career at the club of his hometown Blackpool at 16 years of age, leaving Fleetwood High School in 1990. "I was 18 when I made my first-team debut against Port Vale at home," he recalled to the Chorley Guardian in 2006. "I then signed a two-year contract under Billy (Ayre)." Sam Allardyce succeeded Ayre as manager in 1994, making Beech an integral part of his promotion-chasing playing squad either as a central midfield player or utilising him in the sweeper role. The team narrowly missed out on automatic promotion by three points and lost to Bradford City in the play-offs, subsequently, both Allardyce and Beech left at the end of the 1995–96 season. Beech moved to Hartlepool United in 1996–97, where he gained a growing reputation as a goal-scoring midfield player by making late runs into the box. This attracted the attention of the Championship side Huddersfield Town, who went to tribunal in the 1998–99 season to secure his services. Beech became an established member of Steve Bruce's Premiership-chasing side in the 1999–2000 season.

Following an Achilles operation in 2000–01, Beech struggled to regain full fitness and eventually left Huddersfield to join Rochdale in the 2001–02 season under Paul Simpson. Struggling to fully recover from the Achilles injury, Beech eventually retired from playing in 2004 and made the full-time transition into coaching.

== Coaching career ==
=== Bury ===
Beech completed his UEFA A License in 2005 whilst fast establishing his reputation for player development with Bury supporting then Head of Youth Chris Casper. Casper moved up to become Bury's first team manager and Beech inherited responsibility for Bury's Centre of Excellence, Youth, and Reserve sides with a mandate to establish pathways to the first team for their younger players. Beech's impact on youth football was immediate, transforming Bury's youth team into Youth Alliance League and cup winners and developing now professional players such as David Worrall and Dale Stephens.

=== Rochdale ===
Beech was offered the opportunity to become the head of youth coaching at Rochdale following Keith Hill's appointment from youth team manager to first team manager in 2007–08. Beech also assumed responsibility for the reserve side and the centre of excellence.

This became the start of a 12-year relationship that would see Beech replicate and succeed the success he had at Bury's youth system at Rochdale, with a reputation for establishing quick talented footballers. A stream of footballers came through the club's youth system and either established themselves in the first team or were transferred for substantial fees. Professional players such as Will Buckley, Scott Hogan, Jamie Allen, Callum Camps, and Andy Cannon formed part of this program.

Beech spent time with SC Braga in Portugal in 2009 to complete his Academy Managers course which help shape his philosophy on football player development, and he went on to complete his UEFA Pro License in 2010 with the visit of fellow candidate Gianfranco Zola to Rochdale to complete the FA assessment criteria.

In December 2011, Beech was appointed caretaker manager at Rochdale for a month, following Steve Eyre's dismissal. Rochdale lost three and drew three of the six games in which he took charge of before John Coleman was installed as the permanent manager on 24 January 2012. Beech returned to his role as youth team manager following the appointment.

Keith Hill returned to Rochdale as manager in January 2013 replacing John Coleman, and confirmed Beech was to be his new assistant manager. This was to be the start of arguably the most successful period in the football clubs history, spanning six seasons through to March 2019, winning promotion to League One at the first time of asking in 2014 and achieving consecutive top-ten finishes on minimal finance and several successful FA Cup runs, with a highlight reaching the 5th round and taking Premier League Tottenham Hotspur in February 2018 to a replay at Wembley Stadium, then managed by Mauricio Pochettino.

Beech left Rochdale along with Hill in March 2019 after a poor run of form.

=== Carlisle United ===
Chris Beech was appointed Carlisle United Manager on 26 November 2019, with the team five points above the bottom of League Two and 21st in the league table.

Beech immediately improved performances and results, securing an FA Cup run, and taking Championship side Cardiff City to a replay. In the January transfer window, Carlisle recruited Elliot Watt, Nick Anderton, Callum Guy and Joshua Kayode. His first season at Carlisle was cut short with Carlisle United in 18th place in the League Two table after the 2019–20 season was suspended and then immediately ended due to the COVID-19 pandemic.The final league table was defined on a points-per-game basis.

Football resumed for the 2020–21 season, and Beech was forced to recruit a new-look squad. Following a slow start to the season, Beech's side hit form and consecutive league wins carried them to the top of League Two by January 2021. Beech's Carlisle side was playing fast attacking counter-pressing football, breaking in-game statistics and gaining the side huge plaudits within the national media.

Beech himself was fast gathering a strong reputation and was linked with a number of jobs further up the footballing pyramid. Carlisle rewarded Beech and his assistant Gavin Skelton with new two-year contracts, announced on the club's social media on 25 December 2020.

The COVID-19 pandemic was still in situ and football games were being played frequently behind closed doors. In January 2021, 19 of the Carlisle first-team squad tested positive for the virus, forcing the EFL to suspend their involvement and the football club temporarily shut down. Once Carlisle were able to resume their campaign, bad weather hit the north of England, with Carlisle finding it difficult to get games on or secure training facilities.

At one stage Carlisle found themselves 9 games behind other teams, ultimately having to complete 25 games in a 12-week period which took its toll on the squad and initial results suffered post-COVID shutdown. Cambridge United manager Mark Bonner pre-match stated "Carlisle have been chopped down at the knees with the virus". Their form did eventually pick up, with the team losing only once in the last 11 games, but finished 10th on 66 points.

The 2021–22 season began with much optimism, however, Carlisle failed to retain key players, and the club elected to sell playing assets as the season began, with defenders Aaron Hayden joining Wrexham and George Tanner joining Bristol City just as the transfer window closed.

Supporters began to become disgruntled and frustrated at the lack of investment, lack of ambition and voiced their concerns towards the board of directors. Beech's revised side had an indifferent start to the 2021–22 season. Consecutive league defeats to Sutton United, Forest Green Rovers, and Bristol Rovers ultimately saw Beech lose his job on 10 October 2021.

=== AFC Fylde ===
On 6 December 2022, Beech was appointed Director of Football at National League North club AFC Fylde. The club was promoted to the National League at the end of the 2022–23 season. He was appointed interim manager following the sacking of Adam Murray in October 2023. His appointment saw an improvement in form and on 22 December 2023, Beech was appointed head coach permanently on a contract until the end of the season. Having steered the club clear of the relegation zone, Beech signed a new two-year contract in May 2024.

On 15 September 2024, Beech was sacked by AFC Fylde following a poor start to the season that saw his team pick up just five points from eight matches.

=== Hartlepool United ===
On 14 May 2026, Beech rejoined his old club Hartlepool United, now in the National League, as Head of Recruitment.

== Managerial statistics ==
As of 10 September 2024

Managerial record by team and tenure
Team	From	To	Record					Ref.
Team	From	To	P	W	D	L	Win %	Ref.
Rochdale (caretaker)	19 December 2011	24 January 2012	6	0	3	3	0.00	
Carlisle United	26 November 2019	10 October 2021	88	28	28	32	31.82	
AFC Fylde	8 October 2023	15 September 2024	42	15	10	17	35.71	
Total			136	43	41	52	31.62	—
