= Justin Tellus =

Malta footballer

Personal information
- Full name: Justin Tellus
- Date of birth: 26 December 1974 (age 51)
- Place of birth: Attard, Malta
- Position: Defender

Senior career*
Years	Team	Apps	(Gls)
1994	Sliema Wanderers	1	(0)
1994–1995	St. George's	18	(1)
1995–1999	Birkirkara	87	(1)
1999–2000	Valletta	22	(0)
2001–2002	Birkirkara	21	(0)
2002	→ Marsa (loan)	16	(1)
2002–2003	→ Marsaxlokk (loan)	26	(0)
2003–2004	Marsaxlokk	24	(0)
2004–2008	Mqabba	39	(1)
- * Club domestic league appearances and goals

Justin Tellus (born 26 December 1974) is a Malta former footballer who played as a defender, featuring in the Maltese Premier League and UEFA Cup.

Tellus spent two years as recruitment and development manager for Leeds United SC Hubs after four years in the role as development manager at Northern Premier League Premier Division team Matlock Town. In 2021, Tellus became the academy's head of recruitment and development officer for Chesterfield Football Club.

== Playing career ==
Born in Attard, Malta, Tellus moved to England at an early age and lived in South London, where his mother was from. He played for London Schoolboys throughout his youth career, also spending time with various professional clubs across England.

Tellus began his senior career in 1993 with Maltese team Sliema Wanderers. He joined newly promoted St. George's a year later in 1994 in search of more first team football.

Having won St. George's Player of the Year award, Tellus transferred to Maltese Premier League side Birkirkara where he spent four years and was a key part of the team that won the club's first major honour.

Tellus became the first player in the modern era to transfer from Birkirkara to bitter rivals Valletta in a swap deal for Draško Braunović in 1999.

After the controversial transfer, Tellus won the Super Cup during his season and a half with Valletta.

Tellus returned to Birkirkara for a year before a loan spell at Marsa in 2002. Tellus went on to play for and captain Marsaxlokk and Mqabba in the Maltese First Division before retiring in 2008.

The defender featured in the UEFA Cup for both Birkirkara and Valletta throughout his career.

== Personal life ==
Tellus returned to live in England after retirement to run his business. He was married to Carol Brooke in 2010.

After spending seven years in retirement Tellus returned to football in 2015 in a development manager role as part of the youth set-up at Derbyshire side Matlock Town, who have since produced young talent such as Max Hunt, Zak Brunt, Ashton Hall, Jordan Wells and Harry Wood.

In April 2019, Tellus joined then-EFL Championship side Leeds United as recruitment and development manager for Leeds United SC Hubs for elite player development scholarship.

Tellus went on to join National League club Chesterfield as academy head of recruitment in late 2021.

== Honours ==
=== Sliema Wanderers ===
- MFA Youth League title: 1993–1994.
- MFA Under-21 League title: 1993–1994.

=== Birkirkara ===
- Maltese Super Cup winner: 2002.
- Euro Challenge/Lowenbrau Cup winner: 1998.
- The Super Five Tournament: 1998.

=== Valletta ===
- Maltese Super Cup winner: 2001.
