= Charlie Birch =

English footballer (born 2001)

Personal information
- Full name: Charlie Mark Birch
- Date of birth: 23 October 2001 (age 25)
- Place of birth: Carlisle, England
- Height: 6 ft 1 in (1.86 m)
- Position: Defender

Team information
- Current team: Appalachian FC

Youth career
- –2019: Carlisle United

College career
Years	Team	Apps	(Gls)
2023–2024	Chowan Hawks		

Senior career*
Years	Team	Apps	(Gls)
2019–2021	Carlisle United	1	(0)
2020	→ Kendal Town (loan)	11	(1)
2021–2022	Annan Athletic	7	(0)
2022	Penrith		
2022–2023	Workington	30	(0)
2024–	Appalachian FC		
- * Club domestic league appearances and goals as of 13:41, 8 April 2024 (UTC)

Charlie Mark Birch (born 23 October 2001) is an English footballer who plays as a defender for Appalachian FC.

== Early and personal life ==
Birch was born in Carlisle, as the son of former professional footballer Mark Birch.

== Career ==
Birch started his career at Carlisle United and made his debut for the club on 21 December 2019 as a substitute in a 3–0 defeat away to Colchester United. In February 2020, he was offered a professional contract with the club, signing a one-year contract with the club. Birch was very excited to be offered a professional contract, stating that he was 'over the moon'. In September 2020, Birch joined Northern Premier League Division One North West side Kendal Town on a season-long loan deal. He scored once in 13 appearances for the club before his loan was cut short due to the COVID-19 pandemic. He was released by the club at the end of his contract in summer 2021.

On 10 July 2021, Birch signed for Scottish League Two side Annan Athletic; Birch made his debut for the club that same day in a 1–1 Scottish League Cup draw against Airdrieonians, with Birch scoring Annan's third penalty in a 5–4 shoot-out win.

On 7 January 2022, Birch signed for Northern League Division One side Penrith. In July 2022, he joined Workington.

In April 2024, Birch joined National Premier Soccer League SouthEast Conference club Appalachian FC.

== Career statistics ==
As of match played 27 November 2021

Appearances and goals by club, season and competition
Club	Season	League			FA Cup		League Cup		Other		Total	
Club	Season	Division	Apps	Goals	Apps	Goals	Apps	Goals	Apps	Goals	Apps	Goals
Carlisle United	2019–20	League Two	1	0	0	0	0	0	0	0	1	0
Carlisle United	2020–21	League Two	0	0	0	0	0	0	0	0	0	0
Carlisle United	Total		1	0	0	0	0	0	0	0	1	0
Kendal Town (loan)	2020–21	Northern Premier League Division One North West	11	1	1	0	—		1 (Note: Appearance(s) in the FA Trophy)	0	13	1
Annan Athletic	2021–22	Scottish League Two	7	0	2	0	4	0	1 (Note: Appearance(s) in the Scottish Challenge Cup)	0	14	0
Career total			19	1	3	0	4	0	2	0	28	1
