= Alfreton Town F.C. =

English football club

Alfreton Town
- Full name: Alfreton Town Football Club
- Nickname: The Reds
- Founded: 1959
- Ground: North Street, Alfreton
- Capacity: 3,600 (1,500 seated)
- Coordinates: 53°05′40″N 1°22′53″W
- Chairman: William Rush
- Manager: Jake Buxton
- League: Northern Premier League Premier Division
- 2025–26: National League North, 22nd of 24 (relegated)
- Website: alfretontownfootballclub.com
Home colours	Away colours

Alfreton Town Football Club is a football club based in Alfreton, Derbyshire, England. The club are currently members of the Northern Premier League Premier Division, the seventh tier of English football, and play at North Street.

== History ==
The club was formed in 1959 following the merger of Alfreton Miners Welfare and Alfreton United, taking the name of a previous club that had played in the Midland League in the 1920s. A ground on North Street was provided by the council and the new club spent two seasons in the Central Alliance before switching to the Midland League in 1961. Although they finished bottom of the league in their first season, they were league champions in 1969–70 and reached the first round of the FA Cup for the first time, taking Third Division Barrow to three replays before losing 2–0 at Deepdale. After finishing as runners-up in 1971–72 they won the league again in 1973–74, a season in which they reached the FA Cup first round for a second time, losing to Blyth Spartans in a replay. Between 1972 and 1974 the club also won three League Cups in succession, resulting in them being awarded the trophy permanently by the league. A third league title was won in 1976–77, and the club finished as runners-up again in 1980–81 and 1981–82.

In 1982 the Midland League merged with the Yorkshire League to form the Northern Counties East League, with Alfreton placed in the Premier Division. In 1986–87 they won the Premier Division, earning promotion to the new Division One of the Northern Premier League. The club remained in Division One until 1995–96, when they finished second and were promoted to the Premier Division. The 1997–98 season Alfreton finished bottom of the Premier Division, and were relegated to Division One. The following season they finished last in Division One and were relegated back to the Northern Counties East League.

After finishing fifth in 1999–2000 and third in 2000–01, Alfreton won the Premier Division of the Northern Counties East League in 2001–02 to earn promotion back to Division One of the Northern Premier League. The following season saw them win their division again, gaining promotion to the Premier Division. After finishing fourth in 2003–04 the club were placed in the new Conference North.

Alfreton's first few seasons in the Conference North saw them in lower mid-table, with 2004–05 marking their first appearance in the FA Cup first round since the 1970s, losing 2–0 to Macclesfield Town in a replay. In 2008–09 they finished third in the Conference North, qualifying for the promotion play-offs, in which they were defeated 5–4 on aggregate in the semi-finals by AFC Telford United, losing 2–0 away and winning 4–3 at home. The season also saw them reach the second round of the FA Cup for the first time; having defeated Bury Town 4–2 in the first round, they lost 4–0 at Scunthorpe United in the second. Another third-place finish in the following season led to another play-off campaign; after beating Workington 4–1 in the semi-finals, they lost 2–1 to Fleetwood Town in the final. In 2010–11 they won the Conference North, earning promotion to the Conference National.

The following three seasons saw Alfreton finish in mid-table in the top division of the Conference, reach the FA Cup first round in 2011–12, the second round in 2012–13 and the first round again in 2013–14. England national team goalkeeper Jordan Pickford went on loan to the club from Sunderland in 2013, making 12 appearances in the Conference National and keeping five clean sheets.

In 2014–15 they were relegated back to the renamed National League North. The club finished fifth in the division in 2022–23 before losing 1–0 to Kidderminster Harriers in the play-off quarter-finals. In 2023–24 they beat Worthing 2–0 in the first round of the FA Cup to qualify for the second round, where they drew 0–0 with Walsall before losing the replay 1–0. They went on to finish fifth in the National League North before losing the play-off quarter-final against Boston United on penalties after a 0–0 draw.

== Current squad ==
As of 25 January 2026

Note: Flags indicate national team as defined under FIFA eligibility rules; some limited exceptions apply. Players may hold more than one non-FIFA nationality.

No.	Pos.	Nation	Player
2	DF	ENG	Josh Clackstone
3	DF	ENG	Nathan Newall
4	MF	ENG	Adam Lund
5	DF	ENG	Jack Leckie
7	FW	ENG	Billy Fewster
8	MF	ENG	George Cantrill
9	FW	IRL	Gerry McDonagh
11	FW	ENG	Lewis Salmon
12	DF	ENG	Harry Perritt
14	DF	ENG	Bayley McCann
17	FW	WAL	Siya Ligendza

No.	Pos.	Nation	Player
18	MF	ENG	Ross Derham
21	DF	WAL	Ryan Barrett
23	DF	ENG	Mert Apat
25	FW	ENG	Joe Dodoo
—	GK	ENG	Harry Burgoyne
—	GK	MLT	James Sissons (on loan from Chesterfield)
—	DF	ENG	Taylor Anderson (on loan from Mansfield Town)
—	DF	ENG	Max Hunt
—	DF	ENG	Kieran Wallace
—	MF	ENG	Harry Hawkins

=== Out on loan ===
As of 25 January 2026

Note: Flags indicate national team as defined under FIFA eligibility rules; some limited exceptions apply. Players may hold more than one non-FIFA nationality.

No.	Pos.	Nation	Player
—	MF	USA	Julio Fresneda (at Ramsgate)

== Honours ==
- National League
  - North Division champions 2010–11
- Northern Premier League
  - Division One champions 2002–03
- Northern Counties East League
  - Premier Division champions 1986–87, 2001–02
  - League Cup winners 1984–85, 2001–02
  - President's Cup winners 2001–02
- Midland League
  - Champions 1969–70, 1973–74, 1976–77
  - League Cup winners 1971–72, 1972–73, 1973–74
- Derbyshire Senior Cup
  - Winners 1960–61, 1969–70, 1972–73, 1973–74, 1981–82, 1994–95, 2001–02, 2002–03, 2015–16, 2018–19
- Derbyshire Beneficiaries Cup
  - Winners 2004–05
- Evans Halshaw Floodlit Cup
  - Winners 1987–88, 1995–96
- Ladbrokes Gala Cup
  - Winners 1976–77

== Records ==
- Highest league position: 11th in the Football Conference, 2013–14
- Best FA Cup performance: Second round proper, 2008–09, 2012–13, 2023–24 (replay)
- Best FA Trophy performance: Fourth round, 2002–03 (replay), 2004–05, 2021–22
- Best FA Vase performance: Fifth round, 1999–2000
- Record attendance: 5,023 vs Matlock Town, Central Alliance, 1960
- Biggest victory: 15–0 vs Loughborough United, Midland League, 1969–70
- Heaviest defeat: 9–1 vs Solihull Borough, FA Trophy, 1997; 8–0 vs Bridlington Town, 1991
- Most appearances: John Harrison, 561
- Record goalscorer: John Harrison, 303
- Record transfer fee received: £150,000 from Swindon Town for Aden Flint, January 2011

== See also ==
- Alfreton Town F.C. players
- Alfreton Town F.C. managers
