= Nick Anderton =

English footballer (born 1996)

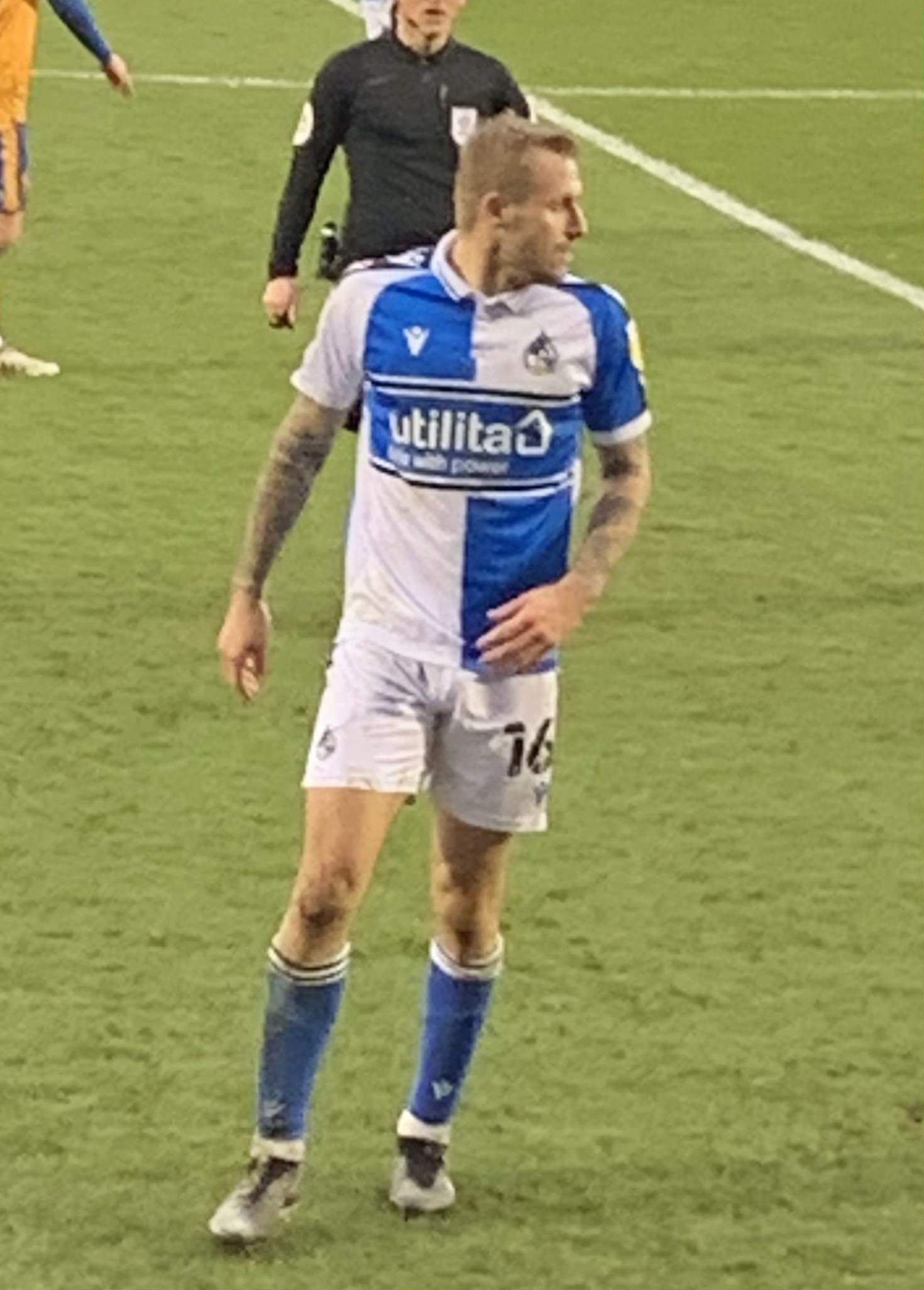
- Anderton playing for Bristol Rovers in 2022.

Personal information
- Full name: Nicholas Jack Wilmer Anderton
- Date of birth: 22 April 1996 (age 30)
- Place of birth: Preston, England
- Height: 6 ft 2 in (1.88 m)
- Position: Left back

Senior career*
Years	Team	Apps	(Gls)
2014–2016	Preston North End	0	(0)
2014	→ Chorley (loan)		
2014	→ Gateshead (loan)	4	(0)
2014–2015	→ Barrow (loan)	9	(0)
2015	→ Aldershot Town (loan)	11	(0)
2015–2016	→ Barrow (loan)	21	(0)
2016–2017	Barrow	43	(1)
2017–2020	Blackpool	16	(0)
2018–2019	→ Accrington Stanley (loan)	22	(0)
2020–2021	Carlisle United	49	(4)
2021–2023	Bristol Rovers	34	(1)
Total		209	(6)
- * Club domestic league appearances and goals

Nicholas Jack Wilmer Anderton (born 22 April 1996) is an English football coach and former professional player.

Anderson played as a left back for Preston North End, Chorley, Gateshead, Barrow, Aldershot Town, Blackpool, Accrington Stanley, Carlisle United and Bristol Rovers. His playing career ended at the age of 26 following cancer, and he became a coach.

== Career ==
Born in Preston, Anderton began his career at Preston North End, moving on loan to Chorley in March 2014 alongside Alex Nicholson. He turned professional in May 2014, at the same time as Jack Ryan. He joined Gateshead on loan in October 2014, and Barrow in December 2014, although the latter loan ended early due to injury. He moved on loan to Aldershot Town in August 2015, before returning to Barrow on loan in November 2015. He signed permanently for Barrow in May 2016, signing a two-year contract. In January 2017 he was linked with a transfer to Bradford City, amongst purported interest from other Football League clubs. He signed for Blackpool in June 2017. He moved on loan to Accrington Stanley in August 2018.

Anderton signed an eighteen-month contract with Carlisle United on 16 January 2020. Ahead of the 2020–21 season, Anderton was appointed as club captain.

=== Bristol Rovers ===
On 26 May 2021, Anderton signed a two-year contract with recently relegated League Two side Bristol Rovers, with effect from 1 July 2021. Anderton made his debut for the club on the opening day of the season, starting as a central defender as Rovers' return to League Two started with a late defeat at Mansfield Town. On 30 October 2021, Anderton opened his account for the club when he scored the only goal as Rovers got an impressive away win at high-flying Harrogate Town with his scuffed effort in the 64th minute settling the match. Anderton played an important role as he achieved a first career promotion with Rovers' 7–0 victory over Scunthorpe United on the final day of the season seeing them move into third position on goals scored.

==== Cancer diagnosis ====
On 28 July 2022, it was announced that Anderton had been diagnosed with osteosarcoma, a rare form of bone cancer, requiring him to undergo an operation on his femur. On the opening day of the 2022–23 season, as Rovers hosted Forest Green Rovers, both sets of players wore shirts in the warm-up to show their support for Anderton; there was also applause in the sixteenth minute of the match, representing Anderton's shirt number at Rovers. During the match, after Aaron Collins equalised, he dedicated the goal to his teammate, holding up a replica shirt with Anderton's name on the back. After the match, manager Joey Barton said that Anderton's surgery would likely leave him unable to walk for a year, vowing that both he and the club would support the player and his young family with Barton promising to run the London Marathon in order to raise money for him.

Anderton underwent a successful treatment in October 2022 to remove the tumour. However, in December, it was revealed that the tumour had been sent off for further analysis following the operation, revealing that the cancerous cells were more aggressive than previously thought and that Anderton would require chemotherapy treatment. Anderton said he was "taken aback" by the support he received.

In order to raise funds for the player, Bristol Rovers started several local initiatives, while manager Barton, as well as the rest of the playing and coaching staff, decided to shave their heads on 16 January 2023, showing support for Anderton and encouraging the club's supporters to do the same, in order to raise awareness of the subject.

Anderton retired from professional football in April 2023, aged 26. In a message published on social media in June 2023, Anderton revealed that he was entering his final week of chemotherapy. On 1 September 2023, he confirmed that following 28 weeks of chemotherapy and a knee operation, he was free of bone cancer.

== Coaching career ==
In January 2024, Anderton was appointed assistant head coach of National League club AFC Fylde. On 15 September 2024, AFC Fylde parted company with both manager Chris Beech and Anderton following a poor start to the season.

== Career statistics ==
Appearances and goals by club, season and competition
Club	Season	League			FA Cup		League Cup		Other		Total	
Club	Season	Division	Apps	Goals	Apps	Goals	Apps	Goals	Apps	Goals	Apps	Goals
Preston North End	2014–15	Championship	0	0	0	0	0	0	—		0	0
Preston North End	2015–16	Championship	0	0	0	0	0	0	—		0	0
Preston North End	Total		0	0	0	0	0	0	—		0	0
Gateshead (loan)	2014–15	Conference Premier	4	0	1	0	—		0	0	5	0
Barrow (loan)	2014–15	Conference North	9	0	0	0	—		0	0	9	0
Aldershot Town (loan)	2015–16	National League	11	0	0	0	—		0	0	11	0
Barrow (loan)	2015–16	National League	21	0	0	0	—		2 (Note: Appearances in the FA Trophy)	0	23	0
Barrow	2016–17	National League	43	1	5	0	—		5	0	53	1
Blackpool	2017–18	League One	4	0	1	0	1	0	5 (Note: Appearances in the EFL Trophy)	0	11	0
Blackpool	2018–19	League One	10	0	0	0	1	0	0	0	11	0
Blackpool	2019–20	League One	2	0	0	0	1	0	2	0	5	0
Blackpool	Total		16	0	1	0	3	0	7	0	27	0
Accrington Stanley (loan)	2018–19	League One	22	0	0	0	0	0	3	0	25	0
Carlisle United	2019–20	League Two	10	2	—		—		—		10	2
Carlisle United	2020–21	League Two	39	2	2	0	1	0	1	0	43	2
Carlisle United	Total		49	4	2	0	1	0	1	0	53	4
Bristol Rovers	2021–22	League Two	34	1	3	1	1	0	1	1	39	3
Bristol Rovers	2022–23	League One	0	0	0	0	0	0	0	0	0	0
Bristol Rovers	Total		34	1	3	1	1	0	1	1	39	3
Career total			209	6	12	1	5	0	19	1	245	8

== Honours ==
Bristol Rovers

- League Two promotion: 2021–22
