= Max Hunt =

English footballer

Personal information
- Full name: Max Hunt
- Date of birth: 1 May 1999 (age 27)
- Place of birth: Chesterfield, England
- Height: 6 ft 6 in (1.98 m)
- Position: Defender

Team information
- Current team: Chorley

Youth career
- Nottingham Forest
- –2016: Matlock Town
- 2016: Mansfield Town
- 2016–2017: Matlock Town

Senior career*
Years	Team	Apps	(Gls)
2017–2018	Matlock Town	4	(0)
2017	→ Belper Town (loan)	15	(0)
2018–2020	Derby County	0	(0)
2019	→ Aldershot Town (loan)	21	(1)
2020–2021	Carlisle United	6	(0)
2020–2021	→ Yeovil Town (loan)	4	(0)
2021–2023	Yeovil Town	64	(0)
2023–2024	Buxton	41	(3)
2024–2026	Alfreton Town	81	(6)
2026–	Chorley	0	(0)
- * Club domestic league appearances and goals as of 08:45, 13 June 2026 (UTC)

Max Hunt (born 1 May 1999) is an English professional footballer who plays as a defender for Chorley.

== Career ==
=== Early career ===
Born in Chesterfield, Derbyshire, Hunt began his football career in the youth system of Nottingham Forest. After being released by Forest, Hunt joined the academy of non-league side Matlock Town. In 2016, at the age of 16 Hunt was invited to train and subsequently join the academy of Mansfield Town, becoming the second NPL Football Academy graduate to sign for a professional football club.

Hunt rejected the opportunity to remain with Mansfield Town's under-21 side, to rejoin the academy of Matlock Town with the aim of playing first-team football. Ahead of the 2017–18 season, Hunt became the first Matlock Town academy graduate in ten years to sign a professional contract with the Gladiators. On 9 August 2017, Hunt joined Northern Premier League Division One South side Belper Town on a short-term loan deal. Hunt returned to Matlock in November 2017, and made his debut for the Gladiators against Lancaster City on 2 December 2017.

=== Derby County ===
Having previously had a trial with Championship side West Bromwich Albion, Hunt signed for fellow Championship side Derby County in January 2018. Hunt agreed an 18-month contract with the Rams, with the club holding an option to extend the deal by a further 12 months with Hunt initially linking up with Derby's under-23 side.

On 4 September 2019, Hunt joined National League side Aldershot Town on an initial month-long loan. He made his debut for Aldershot in their 2–1 home defeat against Barrow on 7 September 2019, and on his fifth appearance Hunt scored his first goal for the Shots in their 3–1 defeat against Yeovil Town on 24 September 2019. On 10 January 2020, after an initial four-month loan deal Hunt returned to parent club Derby County having made 22 appearances for Aldershot.

=== Carlisle United ===
In January 2020, having been recalled from his loan with Aldershot, Hunt signed for League Two club Carlisle United for an undisclosed fee on an 18-month deal. On 18 January 2020, Hunt made his English Football League debut for Carlisle in a 1–1 draw against Oldham Athletic.

On 26 December 2020, Hunt joined National League side Yeovil Town on a one-month loan deal, making his debut the same day in Yeovil's 6–1 away defeat against National League leaders Torquay United.

=== Yeovil Town ===
On 27 January 2021, Hunt signed permanently for National League side Yeovil Town for undisclosed terms, signing an 18-month contract. At the end of the 2022–23 season, Hunt was released by Yeovil following the club's relegation from the National League.

=== Buxton ===
On 27 May 2023, Hunt agreed to join National League North club Buxton.

=== Alfreton Town ===
Hunt signed for Alfreton Town for the 2024–25 season.

=== Chorley ===
In May 2026, Hunt signed for National League North club Chorley.

== Career statistics ==
As of match played 27 February 2024

Appearances and goals by club, season and competition
Club	Season	League			FA Cup		EFL Cup		Other		Total	
Club	Season	Division	Apps	Goals	Apps	Goals	Apps	Goals	Apps	Goals	Apps	Goals
Matlock Town	2017–18	Northern Premier League; Premier Division	4	0	—		—		1 (Note: Appearance in Derbyshire Senior Cup)	0	5	0
Belper Town (loan)	2017–18	Northern Premier League; Division One South	15	0	2	0	—		2 (Note: One appearance in FA Trophy, one appearance in Northern Premier League Challenge Cup)	0	19	0
Derby County	2017–18	Championship	0	0	—		—		0	0	0	0
Derby County	2018–19	Championship	0	0	0	0	0	0	0	0	0	0
Derby County	2019–20	Championship	0	0	0	0	0	0	—		0	0
Derby County	Total		0	0	0	0	0	0	0	0	0	0
Aldershot Town (loan)	2019–20	National League	21	1	1	0	—		0	0	22	1
Carlisle United	2019–20	League Two	4	0	—		—		—		4	0
Carlisle United	2020–21	League Two	2	0	1	0	0	0	2 (Note: Appearances in EFL Trophy)	0	5	0
Carlisle United	Total		6	0	1	0	0	0	2	0	9	0
Yeovil Town (loan)	2020–21	National League	4	0	—		—		—		4	0
Yeovil Town	2020–21	National League	19	0	—		—		—		19	0
Yeovil Town	2021–22	National League	24	0	4	0	—		5 (Note: Two appearances in FA Trophy, three appearances in Somerset Premier Cup)	0	33	0
Yeovil Town	2022–23	National League	21	0	1	0	—		2 (Note: One appearance in FA Trophy, one appearance in Somerset Premier Cup)	0	24	0
Yeovil Town	Total		64	0	5	0	—		7	0	76	0
Buxton	2023–24	National League North	30	2	1	0	—		1 (Note: Appearance in Derbyshire Senior Cup)	0	32	2
Career total			144	3	10	0	0	0	13	0	167	3
