= Aaron Hayden (footballer) =

English footballer (born 1997)

Personal information
- Full name: Aaron Edward-George Hayden
- Date of birth: 16 January 1997 (age 29)
- Place of birth: Croydon, England
- Height: 1.85 m (6 ft 1 in)
- Position: Centre back

Team information
- Current team: Hednesford Town

Youth career
- 2009–2013: Chelsea
- 2013–2015: Wolverhampton Wanderers

Senior career*
Years	Team	Apps	(Gls)
2015–2019	Wolverhampton Wanderers	0	(0)
2015	→ Newport County (loan)	5	(0)
2016–2017	→ Hemel Hempstead Town (loan)	13	(1)
2017	→ Bromley (loan)	0	(0)
2017–2018	→ Telford United (loan)	9	(0)
2018	→ Stourbridge (loan)	12	(1)
2018–2019	→ Stourbridge (loan)	22	(2)
2019	→ Stourbridge (loan)	15	(2)
2019–2021	Carlisle United	62	(7)
2021–2024	Wrexham	81	(19)
2024–2026	Carlisle United	43	(5)
2026-	Hednesford Town	0	(0)
- * Club domestic league appearances and goals as of 19:21, 3 July 2026 (UTC)

Aaron Edward-George Hayden (born 16 January 1997) is an English professional footballer who plays as a centre back for National League North club Hednesford Town.

== Career ==
Having spent four years at Chelsea's academy, Hayden left to become a scholar at Wolverhampton Wanderers aged 16.

He moved on a one-month loan to League Two Newport County on 5 August 2015, and made his senior debut on 8 August against Cambridge United. His loan period was extended by a further month but subsequently terminated on 16 September 2015. After a short loan spell at Hemel Hempstead Town, he was again sent out on loan, this time to Bromley, on 20 January 2017. However, just 8 days later, he returned to Wolves after picking up an injury in a behind-closed-doors friendly, failing to feature in a competitive fixture for the National League club.

At the end of the 2016–17 season, he signed a new contract with Wolves, keeping him at the club until at least 2018.

On 16 February 2018, Hayden was loaned out to Stourbridge until 17 March 2018. The deal was later extended at the end of the season. He then returned to Wolves, but in on 1 August 2018, he was once again loaned out to Stourbridge, this time until 2 January 2019. On 31 January 2019, the loan deal was extended once again, this time for the remainder of the 2018/19 campaign.

On 29 July 2019, Hayden joined Carlisle United on a one-year contract (with option) following a successful trial spell with the club. He made 73 appearances for the club over two seasons.

Hayden joined Wrexham on 8 August 2021 for an undisclosed fee. The defender signed a three-year deal at the Racecourse Ground. He was released at the end of the 2023–24 season. Hayden scored 20 goals in 88 matches for Wrexham as they earned back-to-back promotions to League One.

On 20 May 2024, it was announced that Hayden had re-signed for former club Carlisle United on a two-year deal. On 9 May 2026, the club announced it would be releasing the player.

== Career statistics ==
As of updated 4 October 2025

Appearances and goals by club, season and competition
Club	Season	League			FA Cup		EFL Cup		Other		Total	
Club	Season	Division	Apps	Goals	Apps	Goals	Apps	Goals	Apps	Goals	Apps	Goals
Wolverhampton Wanderers	2015–16	Championship	0	0	0	0	0	0	—		0	0
Wolverhampton Wanderers	2016–17	Championship	0	0	0	0	0	0	—		0	0
Wolverhampton Wanderers	2017–18	Championship	0	0	0	0	0	0	—		0	0
Wolverhampton Wanderers	2018–19	Premier League	0	0	0	0	0	0	—		0	0
Wolverhampton Wanderers	Total		0	0	0	0	0	0	—		0	0
Wolverhampton Wanderers U23	2016–17	—			—		—		2 (Note: Appearance(s) in EFL Trophy)	0	2	0
Newport County (loan)	2015–16	League Two	5	0	0	0	0	0	1	0	6	0
Hemel Hempstead Town (loan)	2016–17	National League South	13	1	6	0	—		3 (Note: Two appearances in FA Trophy, one appearance in Herts Senior Cup)	0	22	1
Bromley (loan)	2016–17	National League	0	0	—		—		—		0	0
AFC Telford United (loan)	2017–18	National League North	9	0	0	0	—		1 (Note: Appearance(s) in FA Trophy)	0	10	0
Stourbridge (loan)	2017–18	Northern Premier League; Premier Division	12	1	—		—		2 (Note: Appearances in Birmingham Senior Cup)	1	14	2
Stourbridge (loan)	2018–19	Southern League; Premier Division Central	37	4	4	1	—		5 (Note: One appearance in FA Trophy, one appearance in Southern League Cup, three appearances in Birmingham Senior Cup)	0	46	5
Carlisle United	2019–20	League Two	18	2	3	1	1	0	2	0	24	3
Carlisle United	2020–21	League Two	44	5	2	0	1	0	2	0	49	5
Carlisle United	Total		62	7	5	1	2	0	4	0	73	8
Wrexham	2021–22	National League	39	7	3	0	—		4	1	46	8
Wrexham	2022–23	National League	26	11	5	0	—		0	0	31	11
Wrexham	2023–24	League Two	16	1	1	0	1	0	0	0	18	1
Wrexham	Total		81	19	9	0	1	0	4	1	95	20
Carlisle United	2024–25	League Two	24	3	1	0	1	0	0	0	26	3
Carlisle United	2025–26	National League	4	1	0	0	0	0	0	0	4	1
Career total			247	36	25	2	4	0	22	2	298	40

== Honours ==
Wrexham

- EFL League Two second-place promotion: 2023–24
- National League: 2022–23
- FA Trophy runner-up: 2021–22

Individual

- National League Team of the Season: 2021–22
