= Danny Devine (footballer, born 1997) =

English footballer

Personal information
- Full name: Daniel Steven Devine
- Date of birth: 4 September 1997 (age 29)
- Place of birth: Bradford, England
- Height: 5 ft 11 in (1.80 m)
- Position: Midfielder

Team information
- Current team: Liversedge

Youth career
- 2010–2016: Bradford City

Senior career*
Years	Team	Apps	(Gls)
2016–2020	Bradford City	30	(1)
2016	→ Harrogate Railway Athletic (loan)		
2020–2022	Carlisle United	28	(0)
2022–2023	Chester	20	(1)
2023	→ Farsley Celtic (loan)	16	(0)
2023	Guiseley	9	(0)
2023–2024	Gainsborough Trinity	14	(0)
2024–	Liversedge	2	(0)
- * Club domestic league appearances and goals as of 22:16, 15 December 2024 (UTC)

Daniel Steven Devine (born 4 September 1997) is an English professional footballer who plays as a midfielder for Liversedge.

== Early and personal life ==
Devine was born in the Bradford Royal Infirmary and attended St Bede's Grammar School in the city. He was a boyhood Bradford City fan.

== Career ==
=== Bradford City ===
Devine began his career with Bradford City, joining at under-13 level, and signing his first professional contract in June 2016. He spent a loan spell at Harrogate Railway Athletic earlier that year.

He made his senior debut for the club on 6 August 2016 in the opening league game of the 2016–17 season, in a march against Port Vale.

He signed a new contract with the club in October 2016, until June 2019. He stated he hoped that his progress with the first-team would act as an inspiration to other young players at the club.

He did not play between March and November 2018 due to injury, making his first appearance of the 2018–19 season as a late substitute in an FA Cup game on 10 November 2018. In April 2019, having made no further first-team appearances, new manager Gary Bowyer said Devine was in "contention" for more games. After returning to first-team action, including his first start in two years on 27 April 2019, Devine said he wanted to help the club's promotion push in the 2019–20 season.

In May 2019, following Bradford City's relegation to League Two, he was one of 3 first-team players to be offered a new contract by the club. Later that month he signed a new one-year contract with the club. He said he hoped the club's relegation would be a new start for the club.

On 19 October 2019 he scored his first goal for Bradford City in a 2–1 league victory at home to Crawley Town. Manager Gary Bowyer said it provided a confidence boost for Devine, and that he hoped Devine had more to offer. On 22 October 2019, in a match against Port Vale, Devine was the only Bradford City player still with the club from when the two teams previously met for his debut in August 2016. In November 2019 he said he was keen to work with and inspire Bradford City's youth players.

On 26 May 2020 it was announced that he was one of 10 players who would leave Bradford City when their contract expired on 30 June 2020. After leaving the club he said that he was "disappointed" how his time at the club ended and that he was looking forward to finding a new club and playing more games.

=== Carlisle United ===
Devine signed for Carlisle United on 6 August 2020 following his release from Bradford City. In December 2020 he said he was looking forward to returning to Bradford to play against his former club. Devine was released by the club at the end of the 2021–22 season.

=== Non-league ===
He signed for Chester in August 2022. He moved on loan to Farsley Celtic in February 2023, before signing permanently for Guiseley in August 2023. In November 2023, he joined Gainsborough Trinity. He broke his leg in February 2024. In December 2024, he signed for Liversedge. He made his debut as a substitute, saying he wanted to start games for the club.

== Career statistics ==
As of match played 14 December 2024

Appearances and goals by club, season and competition
Club	Season	League			FA Cup		League Cup		Other		Total	
Club	Season	Division	Apps	Goals	Apps	Goals	Apps	Goals	Apps	Goals	Apps	Goals
Bradford City	2016–17	League One	11	0	1	0	1	0	6 (Note: Appearance(s) in the EFL Trophy.)	0	19	0
Bradford City	2017–18	League One	3	0	2	0	0	0	4	0	9	0
Bradford City	2018–19	League One	3	0	2	0	0	0	1	0	6	0
Bradford City	2019–20	League Two	13	1	2	0	1	0	3	0	19	1
Bradford City	Total		30	1	7	0	2	0	14	0	53	1
Carlisle United	2020–21	League Two	11	0	0	0	0	0	3	0	14	0
Carlisle United	2021–22	League Two	17	0	1	0	0	0	3	0	21	0
Carlisle United	Total		28	0	1	0	0	0	6	0	35	0
Chester	2022–23	National League North	20	1	2	0	0	0	2 (Note: Appearance(s) in the FA Trophy.)	0	24	1
Farsley Celtic (loan)	2022–23	National League North	16	0	0	0	0	0	0	0	16	0
Guiseley	2023–24	Northern Premier League	9	0	2	0	0	0	2 (Note: One appearance in the West Riding County Cup, one appearance in the FA Trophy)	0	13	0
Gainsborough Trinity	2023–24	Northern Premier League	14	0	0	0	0	0	0	0	14	0
Gainsborough Trinity	2024–25	Northern Premier League	0	0	0	0	0	0	0	0	0	0
Gainsborough Trinity	Total		14	0	0	0	0	0	0	0	14	0
Liversedge	2024–25	NPL East Division	2	0	0	0	0	0	0	0	2	0
Career total			119	2	12	0	2	0	24	0	157	2
