= Joshua Kayode =

Irish footballer (born 2000)

Personal information
- Full name: Joshua Akinola Ogunfaolu-Kayode
- Date of birth: 4 May 2000 (age 26)
- Place of birth: Lagos, Nigeria
- Height: 1.91 m (6 ft 3 in)
- Position: Forward

Team information
- Current team: Rotherham United
- Number: 21

Youth career
- –2017: Rotherham United

Senior career*
Years	Team	Apps	(Gls)
2017–	Rotherham United	24	(1)
2018	→ Chesterfield (loan)	3	(0)
2019–2020	→ Gateshead (loan)	22	(6)
2020	→ Carlisle United (loan)	5	(3)
2020–2021	→ Carlisle United (loan)	34	(8)
2022	→ Milton Keynes Dons (loan)	6	(0)
2023–2024	→ Carlisle United (loan)	3	(0)
2024–2025	→ Shrewsbury Town (loan)	2	(0)

International career^{‡}
2020–2022	Republic of Ireland U21	13	(2)
- * Club domestic league appearances and goals as of 00:09, 19 August 2024 (UTC) ‡ National team caps and goals as of 23:56, 27 September 2022 (UTC)

Joshua Akinola Ogunfaolu-Kayode (born 4 May 2000) is a professional footballer who plays as a forward for Rotherham United.

Born in Nigeria, Kayode represents Ireland internationally.

== Club career ==
=== Rotherham United ===
Kayode was born in Lagos, Nigeria, however, he grew up in Dublin, Ireland playing for St.Mochta's FC in Clonsilla before moving to start his career in the youth team of Rotherham United. He made his professional debut in August 2017 in the EFL Trophy defeat to Manchester City U21. On 20 November 2017 he signed his first professional contract, a deal until the summer of 2020.

On 19 September 2018, Kayode joined National League side Chesterfield on a one-month youth loan. In early August 2019 he joined National League North side Gateshead on loan until January 2020, with conditions attached that meant he could still feature for Rotherham in the EFL Trophy.

After returning from Gateshead, Kayode signed a new 2 1/2-year deal extending his stay at Rotherham United until the summer of 2022. He then moved on loan to League Two side Carlisle United for the remainder of the 2019–20 season. This loan was formally extended in May 2020 to cover any potential extension to the season due to the COVID-19 pandemic.

On 4 August 2020, Kayode returned to Carlisle United, on a one-year loan. In April 2021 whilst on loan at Carlisle, Kayode signed a new contract with the Millers that would keep him at the club until the end of the 2023–24 season. He scored his first goal for Rotherham in an EFL Trophy tie against Crewe Alexandra on 4 January 2022.

In pre-season ahead of the 2022–23 campaign, Kayode would sustain a hamstring injury minutes after scoring the equaliser for Rotherham United in a friendly against Mansfield Town. After recovery, and in the need for game time, Kayode left Rotherham United on loan - signing for MK Dons on the 29 August 2022. He would debut for MK Dons the following day as MK Dons suffered a 1–2 defeat to Cheltenham Town in the EFL Trophy. On 3 September Kayode would make his League bow for the Dons, starting on the bench in a 1–0 loss away to Exeter City, his second League appearance coming versus Bolton Wanderers.

In July 2024, Kayode joined fellow League One side Shrewsbury Town on a season-long loan deal. In August 2024, Kayode scored his first goal for Shrewsbury Town, against Notts County in the Carabao Cup. He returned to Rotherham on 12 January 2025. On 8 May 2026 Rotherham announced he was being released after the team's relegation to EFL League Two.

== International career ==
Kayode was called up the Republic of Ireland under-21 team for the first time in October 2020, for the European Championship qualifier against Italy. He was called up for a second time in November 2020, making his debut from the bench against Iceland under-21 on 15 November 2020. He made his full debut and scored his first under-21 international goal on 18 November 2020, against Luxembourg under-21 in Luxembourg City.

== Career statistics ==
As of 17 August 2024

Appearances and goals by club, season and competition
Club	Season	League			FA Cup		EFL Cup		Other		Total	
Club	Season	Division	Apps	Goals	Apps	Goals	Apps	Goals	Apps	Goals	Apps	Goals
Rotherham United	2017–18	League One	0	0	0	0	0	0	2 (Note: Appearances in EFL Trophy)	0	2	0
Rotherham United	2018–19	Championship	0	0	0	0	0	0	—		0	0
Rotherham United	2019–20	League One	0	0	0	0	0	0	1	0	1	0
Rotherham United	2020–21	Championship	0	0	0	0	0	0	—		0	0
Rotherham United	2021–22	League One	20	1	2	0	1	0	5	1	28	2
Rotherham United	2022–23	Championship	0	0	0	0	1	0	—		1	0
Rotherham United	2023–24	Championship	4	0	0	0	1	1	–		5	1
Rotherham United	Total		24	1	2	0	3	1	8	1	37	3
Chesterfield (loan)	2018–19	National League	3	0	—		—		—		3	0
Gateshead (loan)	2019–20	National League North	22	6	4	2	—		1 (Note: Appearances in FA Trophy)	0	27	8
Carlisle United (loan)	2019–20	League Two	5	3	—		—		—		5	3
Carlisle United (loan)	2020–21	League Two	34	8	2	0	0	0	—		36	8
Carlisle United (loan)	2023–24	League One	3	0	0	0	0	0	1	0	4	0
Carlisle United (loan)	Total		42	11	2	0	0	0	1	0	45	11
Milton Keynes Dons (loan)	2022–23	League One	6	0	0	0	—		3	0	9	0
Shrewsbury Town (loan)	2024–25	League One	2	0	0	0	1	1	0	0	3	1
Career total			99	18	8	2	4	2	13	1	124	23

== Honours ==
Rotherham United

- EFL League One second-place promotion: 2021–22
- EFL Trophy: 2021–22
