= George Tanner (English footballer) =

English footballer

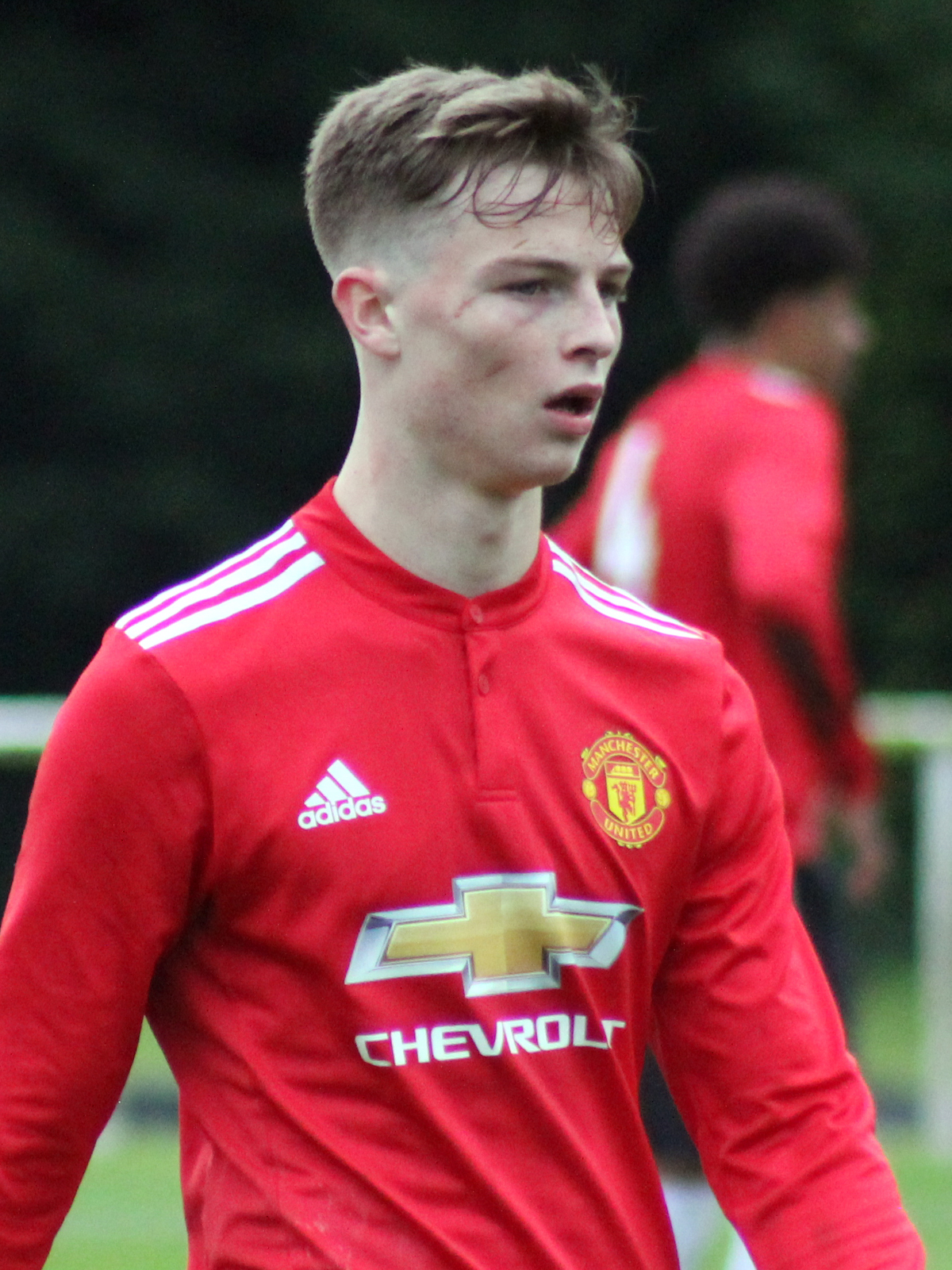
- Tanner playing for Manchester United U18s in November 2017

Personal information
- Full name: George Tanner
- Date of birth: 16 November 1999 (age 27)
- Place of birth: Blackpool, England
- Height: 5 ft 11 in (1.81 m)
- Position: Full-back

Team information
- Current team: Bristol City
- Number: 19

Youth career
- 2015–2019: Manchester United

Senior career*
Years	Team	Apps	(Gls)
2019–2020	Manchester United	0	(0)
2019–2020	→ Morecambe (loan)	23	(0)
2020	→ Salford City (loan)	0	(0)
2020–2021	Carlisle United	42	(3)
2021–	Bristol City	155	(3)
- * Club domestic league appearances and goals as of 09:18, 22 November 2026 (UTC)

George Tanner (born 16 November 1999) is an English professional footballer who plays for EFL Championship club Bristol City as a full-back.

== Career ==
=== Manchester United ===
Initially a forward, Tanner made seven appearances for Manchester United's under-18 team in 2015–16, and joined the club as an academy scholar in July 2016. After joining the club, he found himself used more as a full-back, and made 27 appearances from left-back in 2016–17. He added another 20 appearances for the under-18s in 2017–18, as well as a further seven for the under-19s in the 2017–18 UEFA Youth League and one in the 2017–18 FA Youth Cup. He signed his first professional contract with the club on 30 January 2018. In 2018–19, he was promoted to the under-23 side, making his debut in a 2–2 draw at Fulham on 9 August 2018. He made 17 appearances in Premier League 2 that season, as well as another three in the 2018–19 UEFA Youth League.

In 2019–20, after being an unused substitute for Manchester United's under-23s in a 2–0 win over Rotherham United in the EFL Trophy on 6 August 2019, Tanner joined Morecambe for the remainder of the season. He made his debut for Morecambe in an EFL Cup first-round game against Mansfield Town on 13 August, receiving a booking as the match finished in a 2–2 draw, Morecambe progressing on penalties. He made his English Football League debut four days later, playing 63 minutes of a goalless draw with Cheltenham Town. After his loan at Morecambe was cut short early, Tanner joined another League Two club on loan, this time Salford City.

He was released by Manchester United at the end of the 2019–20 season.

=== Carlisle United ===
On 3 August 2020 he signed for Carlisle United. He scored his first goal for the club on 27 October 2020, in a 3–1 league victory against Morecambe.

=== Bristol City ===
He signed for Bristol City on 30 August 2021.

On 23 May 2025, the club announced the player had signed a new three-year contract until 2028.

== Career statistics ==
As of match played 21 November 2026

Appearances and goals by club, season and competition
Club	Season	League			FA Cup		League Cup		Other		Total	
Club	Season	Division	Apps	Goals	Apps	Goals	Apps	Goals	Apps	Goals	Apps	Goals
Manchester United	2019–20	Premier League	0	0	0	0	0	0	0	0	0	0
Morecambe (loan)	2019–20	League Two	23	0	1	0	2	0	3 (Note: Appearance(s) in the Football League Trophy.)	0	29	0
Salford City (loan)	2019–20	League Two	0	0	0	0	0	0	0	0	0	0
Carlisle United	2020–21	League Two	37	3	2	0	1	0	2	0	42	3
Carlisle United	2021–22	League Two	5	0	0	0	1	0	0	0	6	0
Carlisle United	Total		42	3	2	0	2	0	2	0	48	3
Bristol City	2021–22	Championship	13	1	0	0	0	0	—		13	1
Bristol City	2022–23	Championship	26	0	4	0	2	0	—		32	0
Bristol City	2023–24	Championship	37	0	4	0	2	0	—		43	0
Bristol City	2024–25	Championship	32	2	1	0	1	0	2 (Note: Appearances in the EFL Championship play-offs)	0	36	2
Bristol City	2025–26	Championship	33	0	2	0	2	0	—		37	0
Bristol City	2026–27	Championship	14	0	0	0	1	0	—		15	0
Bristol City	Total		155	3	11	0	8	0	2	0	176	3
Career total			220	6	14	0	12	0	7	0	253	6
