= Mohammed Sagaf =

Somali footballer

Mo Sagaf
Personal information
- Full name: Mohammed Ali Omar Sagaf
- Date of birth: 12 November 1997 (age 29)
- Place of birth: Kismayo, Somalia
- Height: 1.74 m (5 ft 9 in)
- Position: Midfielder

Team information
- Current team: Hornchurch
- Number: 29

Youth career
- 2015: Real Avilés
- 2015–2016: Ternana

Senior career*
Years	Team	Apps	(Gls)
2015	North Greenford United	0	(0)
2016–2017	Leatherhead	25	(4)
2017–2018	Waltham Forest	18	(8)
2018	Ipswich Town	0	(0)
2018	Barking	0	(0)
2018–2019	Braintree Town	27	(4)
2019–2020	Carlisle United	17	(1)
2021–2023	Dagenham & Redbridge	94	(2)
2023–2025	Boreham Wood	42	(1)
2025–2026	Eastbourne Borough	17	(1)
2026–	Hornchurch	0	(0)

International career^{‡}
2024	Tanzania	3	(0)
- * Club domestic league appearances and goals as of 21:33, 8 November 2026 (UTC) ‡ National team caps and goals as of 21:38, 8 November 2026 (UTC)

Mohammed Ali Omar Sagaf (Somali: Maxamed Cali Cumar Sagaf, born 12 November 1997) is a Somali-born Tanzanian professional footballer who plays for Hornchurch as a midfielder.

== Club career ==
Sagaf began his career in the youth team at Chingford-based Ryan FC before joining the youth team at Real Avilés in February 2015 along with team-mate and compatriot Salim Nassor. He began his senior career in August that year at North Greenford United, where he played in four FA Cup games at the start of the 2015–16 season. In September 2015, Sagaf, along with Nassor, travelled to Italy and joined the academy at Ternana, where he played for the under-19 team in Campionato Primavera. Sagaf returned to England and played for Leatherhead in the 2016–17 season, before joining Waltham Forest for 2017–18, where he scored 10 goals in 23 games and was made captain.

In January 2018, Sagaf joined Ipswich Town, where he played for the under-23 team. After a brief spell with Barking at the start of the 2018–19 season, Sagaf joined Braintree Town in September 2018. He won the National League player of the month in April 2019 after three goals in five games that month. After a trial with FK Sarajevo the following month, Sagaf returned to England and signed a one-year deal with Carlisle United after a successful trial. He scored on his League Two debut as a substitute against Swindon Town on 10 August 2019. Sagaf was released at the end of the season. On 30 January 2021, Sagaf signed for National League side Dagenham & Redbridge.

In July 2023, Sagaf signed for fellow National League side Boreham Wood having departed Dagenham & Redbridge at the end of the 2022–23 season. On 27 May 2025, Sagaf was released by Boreham Wood following their promotion from the National League South.

== International career ==
Born in Somalia, Sagaf grew up in Tanzania. In December 2023, he was pre-called up by the Tanzania national team for the 2023 Africa Cup of Nations, but didn't play a single minute as Tanzania crashed out at the group stages. Sagaf was capped by Tanzania on three occasions in 2024 for friendly games.

== Career statistics ==
As of match played 29 November 2025

Appearances and goals by club, season and competition
Club	Season	League			FA Cup		League Cup		Other		Total	
Club	Season	Division	Apps	Goals	Apps	Goals	Apps	Goals	Apps	Goals	Apps	Goals
North Greenford United	2015–16	SFL Division One Central	0	0	4	1	—		—		4	1
Leatherhead	2016–17	IL Premier Division	25	4	—		—		—		25	4
Waltham Forest	2017–18	Essex Senior League	18	8	2	0	—		3 (Note: One appearance and two goals in Essex Senior League Cup, two appearances in Gordon Brasted Memorial Trophy)	2	23	10
Ipswich Town	2017–18	Championship	0	0	—		—		—		0	0
Barking	2018–19	IL North Division	0	0	—		—		—		0	0
Braintree Town	2018–19	National League	27	4	1	0	—		1 (Note: Appearance(s) in FA Trophy)	0	29	4
Carlisle United	2019–20	League Two	17	1	1	0	0	0	2 (Note: Appearance(s) in EFL Trophy)	0	20	1
Dagenham & Redbridge	2020–21	National League	13	0	—		—		—		13	0
Dagenham & Redbridge	2021–22	National League	37	1	2	0	—		4	1	43	2
Dagenham & Redbridge	2022–23	National League	44	1	4	1	—		1	0	49	2
Dagenham & Redbridge	Total		94	2	6	1	—		5	1	105	4
Boreham Wood	2023–24	National League	19	1	0	0	—		0	0	19	1
Boreham Wood	2024–25	National League South	23	0	1	0	—		3	0	27	0
Boreham Wood	Total		42	1	1	0	—		3	0	46	1
Eastbourne Borough	2025–26	National League South	17	1	3	0	—		3 (Note: One appearance in FA Trophy, two appearances in Sussex Senior Cup)	0	23	1
Career total			240	21	17	2	0	0	18	3	275	26

== Honours ==
Boreham Wood

- National League South play-offs: 2025
