= Louis Gray (footballer) =

Welsh footballer

Personal information
- Full name: Louis Benjamin Gray
- Date of birth: 11 August 1995 (age 31)
- Place of birth: Wrexham, Wales
- Height: 6 ft 1 in (1.86 m)
- Position: Goalkeeper

Senior career*
Years	Team	Apps	(Gls)
2013–2015	Wrexham	0	(0)
2013	→ Rhyl (loan)	2	(0)
2015	→ Cefn Druids (loan)	13	(0)
2015–2018	Everton	0	(0)
2015	→ Colwyn Bay (loan)		
2018	→ Carlisle United (loan)	0	(0)
2018	Nuneaton Borough	4	(0)
2018–2020	Carlisle United	0	(0)
2020	→ Chester (loan)	1	(0)
2020–2022	Chester	48	(0)
2022	Nantwich Town	13	(0)
2022	AFC Telford United	2	(0)
- * Club domestic league appearances and goals as of 23:35, 26 November 2022 (UTC)

Louis Benjamin Gray (born 11 August 1995) is a Welsh professional footballer who plays as a goalkeeper.

== Career ==
Gray began his career with Wrexham, and spent loan spells at Rhyl and Cefn Druids. He moved to Everton in 2015, and spent a loan spell at Colwyn Bay in October 2015. He moved on loan to Carlisle United in January 2018.

He was released by Everton at the end of the 2017–18 season. He signed for Nuneaton Borough in August 2018. He returned to Carlisle United in October 2018, signing a new contract a week later keeping him at the club until January 2019. In December 2018 he signed a further contract extension, until the end of the 2018–19 season. He was offered a new contract by Carlisle at the end of the 2018–19 season. He made his senior debut for the club on 15 October 2019, in the EFL Trophy.

He moved on loan to Chester in February 2020.

In May 2020 Carlisle United announced that Gray would leave the club when his contract expired on 30 June 2020. He played for Chester in the July 2020 play-off matches, despite technically being a free agent, after permission was granted by the league to temporarily register him as a Chester player. He signed for the club in August 2020. In January 2021 he said he wanted to beat the club's clean sheet record.

In July 2022, Gray joined Northern Premier League Premier Division club Nantwich Town. He then signed for AFC Telford United.
