= List of association football mascots =

The following is a list of mascots of Association football teams, sorted by the country in whose league they appear.

== Competitions ==
- FIFA World Cup official mascots
- UEFA European Championship official mascots
- AFC Asian Cup official mascots
- Copa América mascots

== Australia ==
- Ticker – Melbourne Heart FC
- Marvin the Mariner – Central Coast Mariners FC
- Captain Yellowbeard and Admiral Frederick - Central Coast Mariners FC
- George the Gorilla – Perth Glory FC
- Spike - Perth Glory FC
- Roary the Lion – Brisbane Roar FC
- Benny – Newcastle United Jets FC
- Syd and Sydnee – Sydney FC
- Red the Kangaroo – Adelaide United FC
- Nixie - Wellington Phoenix FC

== Brazil ==
Each Brazilian football team has a number of symbols attached to it and is used prominently by the fandom. Among these symbols are the badge, the flag, the anthem and the mascot. While the first three are commonplace all over the world, the last one is peculiarly Brazilian both in its character and its use.

A club's mascot is a cartoon character, often that of an animal, that symbolises some virtue boasted by the team. Most of them have proper names. Usually mascots come in two versions, a "soft" one, which is the official and a "hardcore" one used by ultras and torcidas, which often contain traces of vulgarity or violence.

A mascot is also created for the World Cups, and are used for promoting environmental awareness.

Animals
Brazil national football team	Canarinho (also known as "Canarinho Pistola" (Portuguese: "Angry canary"))	A Canary
ABC	Elefante	An elephant
América Futebol Clube (MG)	Coelho	A cute white "bunny" rabbit
Associação Atlética Ponte Preta	Macaca ("she-monkey")	A female ape
Associação Desportiva São Caetano	Azulão ("big blue")	A blue bird
Atlético Rio Negro Clube (AM)	Galo Carijó ("Spotty Rooster")	A black-and-white feathered rooster.
Avaí Futebol Clube	Leão	A lion
Botafogo de Futebol e Regatas	Biriba/Cachorro	A mongrel dog, very popular in the 1940s and 50s, is being adopted again by the fans since the late 1990s.
Brasiliense Futebol Clube	Jacaré	An alligator
Centro Sportivo Alagoano	Azulão ("big blue")	A blue bird
Club Athletico Paranaense	Fura-Cão	A dog in a luchador get-up; name alludes to "furacão" (hurricane), the team's nickname
Clube Atlético Mineiro	Galo	A black-and-white feathered rooster
CRB	Galo-da-campina	A small white-red bird (the name translates literally into "country rooster")
Clube de Regatas do Flamengo	Urubu	A black vulture
Clube do Remo	Leão	A lion
Clube Esportivo Bento Gonçalves	Zebra	A zebra
Clube Náutico Capibaribe	Timbu	A brown opossum
Criciúma Esporte Clube	Tigrão	A tiger
Cruzeiro Esporte Clube	Raposa	A brown fox
Esporte Clube Juventude	Papagaio	A parrot
Esporte Clube Vitória	Leão	A lion
Ferroviário Atlético Clube (CE)	Tubarão	A white shark
Fluminense de Feira Futebol Clube	Touro do Sertão ("the bull from the outback")	A ferocious bull
Fortaleza Esporte Clube	Leão	A lion
Goiás Esporte Clube	Periquito	A green parakeet
Joinville Esporte Clube	Coelho	A rabbit
Maranhão Atlético Clube	Bode	A goat
Mogi Mirim Esporte Clube	Sapão ("he-toad")	A big green toad
Operário Futebol Clube (MS)	Galo	A rooster
Paraná Clube	Gralha azul	An azure jay, a dark-blue bird with a long beek
Piauí Esporte Clube	Ratinho	A mouse
Santa Cruz Futebol Clube	Cobra-coral	A coral snake
Santos Futebol Clube	Baleião e Baleinha	Two Orcas wearing the club's home and away uniforms
Sociedade Esportiva do Gama	Periquito	A green parakeet
Sociedade Esportiva Itapirense	Coelho	A rabbit
Sociedade Esportiva Palmeiras	Periquito, Porco ("swine")	A green parakeet, the original and official mascot, and a hog, adopted by the supporters.
Sport Club do Recife	Leão da Ilha ("Island Lion")	A lion
Treze Futebol Clube	Galo da Borborema	A rooster
Vila Nova Futebol Clube	Tigre	A tiger
Ypiranga Futebol Clube	Canarinho	A yellow domestic canary
Human (or somewhat human) figures
América Football Club	Diabo	The devil, himself, pictured red, with pointy black beard, horns, arrow-pointed tail and sporting a trident.
ASA	Fantasma ("phantom")	A fiendish ghost
Botafogo de Futebol e Regatas	Manequinho	A boy pissing, a replica of Manneken Pis. Adopted in the 1980s, since the late 1990s is being replaced by the mongrel dog (used in the 1950s) among fans.
Botafogo Futebol Clube (PB)	Xerife	A sheriff
Ceará Sporting Club	Vovô ("grandpa")	An old man with a shotgun
Clube Atlético Paranaense	Furacão ("hurricane")	A lamp genie who is also a human-hurricane hybrid
Clube de Regatas Vasco da Gama	Almirante ("Admiral")	A Portuguese sea captain
Clube Sportivo Sergipe	Capeta ("demon")	The devil (with horns, pointy tail, trident and all)
Coritiba Football Club	Vovô ("grandpa")	An old man (usually sporting a cane or listening to a portable radio)
Esporte Clube Bahia	Super-Homem	A man in a blue super-hero costume, inspired on DC Comics' Superman.
Fluminense Football Club	Guerreirinho (The Little Warrior)	A knight. Named after the nickname "Time de Guerreiros" (Warriors' Team) that came around in 2009. Since 2016, it's the official mascot.
Grêmio Esportivo Brasil	Xavante	An Indian
Grêmio Foot-Ball Porto Alegrense	Mosqueteiro	A musketeer (a man in a 16th-century army uniform)
Guarani Futebol Clube	Bugre	An Indian
Clube Atlético Juventus (SP)	Moleque Travesso ("trickster boy")	A fair-haired boy with a freckled face (homage to the Italian immigrants who founded the club).
São Paulo Futebol Clube	Saint Paul	A white-bearded man with a halo over its head wearing the club's jersey, representing the saint that names both the team and its city.
Sociedade Esportiva e Recreativa Caxias do Sul	Bepe	A drunk man in Italian costume.
Sport Club Corinthians Paulista	Mosqueteiro	A musketeer (a man in a 16th-century army uniform)
Sport Club Internacional	Saci	A black one-legged boy wearing a phrygian cap and smoking from a pipe
Monsters and other
América Futebol Clube de Natal	Dragão	A dragon
Atlético Clube Goianiense	Dragão	A red dragon
Moto Clube (MA)	Bicho-papão	A red furry monster.
Paysandu Sport Club	Bicho-papão	A furry monster. Sometimes pictured as the "big bad wolf".
Souza Esporte Clube	Dinossauro	A dinosaur
Torcidas Organizadas mascots
Força Jovem Vasco	Eddie	Eddie the Head
Galoucura Clube Atlético Mineiro	Pulgão	A dog flea.
Jovem Fla	Tanque	A three-cannon war tank.
Mancha Alviverde Sociedade Esportiva Palmeiras	Mancha Verde	Phantom Blot
Gaviões da Fiel Sport Club Corinthians Paulista	Gavião	Hawk
Torcida Tricolor Independente São Paulo Futebol Clube	Jason	Jason Voorhees

== Canada ==
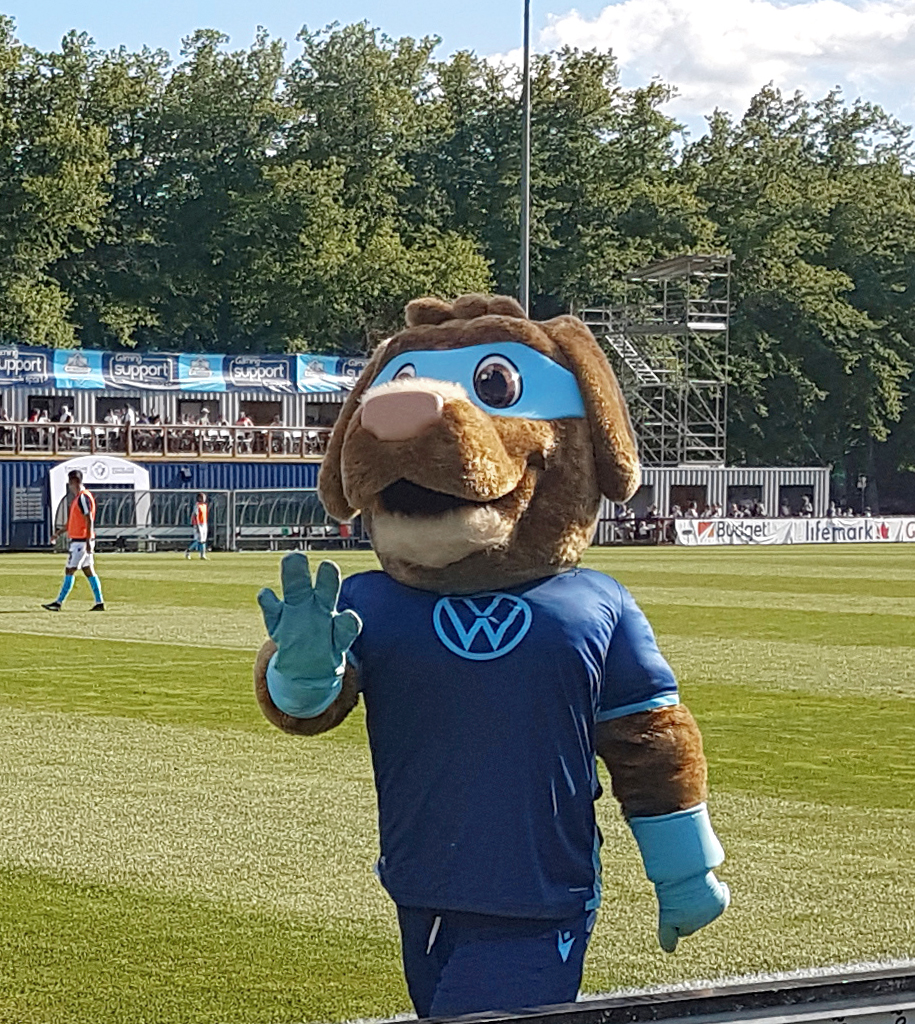
Rover, a Nova Scotia Duck Tolling Retriever, is the mascot of HFX Wanderers FC.

- Tac-Tik the dog – CF Montréal
- Blue Bolt the Rabbit – FC Edmonton
- Sparx the Dragon – Forge FC
- Jawslyn – Halifax Tides FC
- Rover – HFX Wanderers FC
- Bitchy the Hawk – Toronto FC
- Winger (former) (a bird) – Vancouver Whitecaps
- Spike the Belted Kingfisher – Vancouver Whitecaps FC

== Chile ==
- Audax Italiano - "Conejo McPiccola" (McPiccola the Rabbit) - A white rabbit wearing a top hat.
- Cobreloa - A culpeo fox.
- Cobresal - "Cobresalito" - A boy-like copper miner.
- Colo-Colo - A mapuche warrior based on the mapuche leader of the same name.
- Coquimbo Unido - "El Barbón" (The beardy man) - A pirate.
- Deportes Antofagasta - A Puma concolor
- Deportes Concepción - "Haroldito" - A lion
- Deportes Copiapó - A lion.
- Deportes Iquique - A blue-sky dragon.
- Deportes La Serena - "Papayín" and "Conquistador" (The Conquistador) - The first being a papaya-like figure which was replaced by the second one (figure resembling a Spanish conquistador in knight armor) in recent times.
- Deportes Limache - "Tomatín" - A tomato-like figure.
- Deportes Puerto Montt - "Salmonix"; "Chancho Lorenzo" (Lorenzo the pig) and "Chinquihuin" - The first one forgotten since the mid-2000s decade which resembles a salmon-like figure, the second one a big figure of a domestic pig placed in the Estadio Regional de Chinquihue being the mascot of their sponsor (Productos Llanquihue) and the last one the current official mascot, a dolphin-like figure with the teams' colors based on their emblem and nickname ("The Dolphins").
- Deportes Temuco - "Indio Pije" - A mapuche native.
- Everton de Viña - A white Gull.
- Huachipato FC - "Metalito" - A Steel-made-man-like figure.
- Ñublense - "Diablonga" (Mix between "diablo" and "longaniza") - A Devil-like figure in Longaniza-like shape.
- O'Higgins F.C. - "Celestín" - A miner. Popular in the 1970s through the 1980s, but mostly forgotten since then.
- Palestino - "Jeque Moroni" (Moroni Sheikh) - An Arab-Palestinian Sheikh like figure.
- Provincial Osorno - A Bull
- Rangers de Talca - "Pocho" and "Señor PF" (Mr. PF) - While the first being the official mascot (a magellanic woodpecker figure) the second remains popular between fans, despite being the mascot of their biggest sponsor, Productos Fernandez (a figure based on the logo of said brand).
- San Antonio Unido - A white Gull.
- San Luis de Quillota - A yellow canary.
- San Marcos de Arica - "El Bravo del Morro" (A Brave of The Morro) - A figure resembling a Chilean War of the Pacific soldier.
- Santiago Wanderers - "Caturro" - A monk parakeet, one of the oldest mascots in Chilean football.
- Trasandino de Los Andes - An andean condor.
- Unión Española - "Hispanito" - A black eagle based on the Eagle of Saint John.
- Universidad de Concepción - "Mateo" - A yellow monster-like figure. Its name is a common nickname in Chile for outstanding students.
- Universidad Católica - "Cruzado" (The Crusader) - A templar knight crusader.
- Universidad de Chile - "Chunchito" - A blue austral pygmy owl, called "chunchos" in Spanish.

== China ==
- Gogoal (Dog) Zhejiang FC
- Benben (Bull) Qingdao Hainiu FC
- Jingshi (Lion) Beijing Guoan FC
- Bulu (Cheetah) Shanghai Shenhua FC
- Babu (Elephant) Henan FC
- Longxiaofei (Dragon) Qingdao West Coast FC
- Kuikui (Seal) Dalian Yingbo FC
- Three Towns Tiger Wuhan Three Towns FC

== Costa Rica ==
=== Liga FPD ===
- Tigre Team (Tiger) - Club Sport Herediano
- Max, el Manigordo (Ocelot) - C.S. Cartaginés
- León and Leona (lion and lioness) - Liga Deportiva Alajuelense
- Monstruo Morado (Dragon) - Deportivo Saprissa
- Charlie el Toro (Bull) - A.D. San Carlos
- Tiburón Parcero (Shark) - Puntarenas F.C.
- Albo and Alba (brother and sister) - Sporting F.C.
- Auri el Coyote (Coyote) - Municipal Liberia
- Lupillo el Mapache (Raccoon) - Guadalupe F.C.

== Colombia ==
=== Colombian First Division League (Liga Dimayor) ===
- El Águila (Eagle) Águilas Doradas Rionegro
- Barcino (Ginger Bull) Atlético Huila
- Nacho (Green Tiger) - Atlético Nacional
- Igui (Iguana) Deportivo Cali
- Odim (Gorilla) 90's - Deportivo Independiente Medellín
- Fidel (White German Shepherd) 2015- - Deportivo Independiente Medellín
- Cuy (Guinea Pig) Deportivo Pasto
- Rocko (Wolf) Deportivo Pereira
- Monaguillo (Lion) - Independiente Santa Fe
- Jaguar (Jaguar) Jaguares Fútbol Club
- Willy (Shark) - Junior de Barranquilla
- Millo (Boy) Millonarios
- Blanco de la Montaña Mountain's White (Spectacled Bear) Once Caldas

=== Colombian Promotion Tournament (Torneo Dimayor) ===
- Kike (Horse) Llaneros FC Villavicencio

== El Salvador ==
=== Primera División de El Salvador (Liga Pepsi) ===
- "Invictus" (Elephant) - Alianza
- "Lucho" (Eagle) - Águila
- "Tigre" (Tiger) - FAS
- "Torito" (Bull) - Luis Ángel Firpo
- "Tocinito" (Pig) - Municipal Limeño
- "Ñaguar" (Jaguar) - Isidro Metapán
- "Paco" (Rooster) - Platense
- "Cafecito" (Coffee bean) - Cacahuatique
- "Teco" (Owl) - Zacatecoluca

=== Tercera División de El Salvador (Electrolit Tercera División) ===
- Robli (Plant) - El Roble

== England and Wales ==
- Cherry Bear – AFC Bournemouth
- Brooksy Bear - Eastleigh F C
- Haydon the Womble – AFC Wimbledon
- Gunnersaurus Rex – Arsenal F.C.
- Hercules the Lion – Aston Villa F.C.
- Mr Bumble – Barnet F.C.
- Toby Tyke and Tabitha Tyke – Barnsley F.C.
- Beau Brummie and Belle Brummie– Birmingham City F.C.
- Rover the Dog - Blackburn Rovers F.C.
- Rover the Dog - Blackburn Rovers F.C.
- Bloomfield Bear - Blackpool F.C.
- Lofty the Lion – Bolton Wanderers F.C.
- Lofty Jr. – Bolton Wanderers F.C.
- Billy Bantam – Bradford City A.F.C.
- City Gent, The – Bradford City A.F.C.
- Buzz Bee and Buzzette – Brentford F.C.
- Gully the Seagull – Brighton and Hove Albion F.C.
- Scrumpy the Robin – Bristol City
- Captain Gas – Bristol Rovers F.C.
- Robbie the Bobby (Devo) – Bury F.C.
- Bertie Bee and Bella Bee – Burnley F.C.
- Bettie Brewer – Burton Albion F.C.
- Billy Brewer – Burton Albion F.C.
- Amber the Moose – Cambridge United F.C.
- Marvin the Moose – Cambridge United F.C.
- Bartley Bluebird – Cardiff City F.C.
- Olga the Fox – Carlisle United F.C.
- Floyd the Dog– Charlton Athletic F.C.
- Harvey the Cat – Charlton Athletic F.C.
- Stamford The Lion and Bridget The Lioness (bipedal lion and lioness couple) – Chelsea F.C.
- Big Lupus – Chester F.C.
- Chester the Field Mouse – Chesterfield F.C.
- Eddie the Eagle – Colchester United F.C.
- Sky Blue Sam – Coventry City F.C.
- Reggie Red – Crawley Town F.C.
- Gresty the Lion – Crewe Alexandra FC
- Alice the Eagle and Pete the Eagle – Crystal Palace F.C.
- Kayla the American bald eagle - Crystal Palace F.C.
- Digger the Dog – Dagenham & Redbridge F.C.
- Mr Q - Darlington F.C.
- Rammie and Ewie - Derby County F.C.
- Donnie – MK Dons F.C.
- Mooie – MK Dons F.C.
- Donny Dog – Doncaster Rovers F.C.
- Changy the Elephant – Everton F.C
- Mr Toffee – Everton F.C.
- Grecian the Lion – Exeter City F.C.
- Billy the Badger – Fulham F.C.
- Terry Bytes – Fulham F.C.
- Tommy & Tammy Trewblu – Gillingham F.C.
- Mighty Mariner – Grimsby Town F.C.
- Freddy the Fox – Halifax Town A.F.C.
- H'Angus the Monkey – Hartlepool United F.C.
- Edgar the Bull – Hereford F.C.
- Roary and Amber – Hull City A.F.C.
- Bluey, Crazee – Ipswich Town F.C.
- Jenny the Giraffe – Sutton United F.C.
- Kingsley Royal – Reading F.C.
- Filbert Fox - Leicester City F.C.
- Lucas the Kop Cat – Leeds United A.F.C.
- Theo the Wyvern – Leyton Orient F.C.
- Poacher the Imp – Lincoln City F.C.
- Mighty Red – Liverpool F.C. – Since 2012
- Happy Harry and Happy Hatty — Luton Town F.C.
- Roary the Lion – Macclesfield Town F.C.
- Moonchester and Moonbeam – Manchester City F.C.
- Fred the Red – Manchester United F.C.
- Sammy the Stag – Mansfield Town F.C.
- Christie the Cat – Morecambe F.C.
- Roary the Lion – Middlesbrough F.C.
- Zampa the Lion – Millwall F.C.
- Monty Magpie and Maggie Magpie – Newcastle United F.C.
- Spytty the Dog – Newport County A.F.C.
- Camilla Canary – Norwich City F.C.
- Captain Canary – Norwich City F.C.
- Mr. and Mrs. Magpie – Notts County F.C.
- Robin Hood – Nottingham Forest F.C.
- Chaddy the Owl – Oldham Athletic A.F.C. 2002, 2003
- Olly the Ox and Olivia the Ox – Oxford United F.C.
- Mick the Skip - Peterborough United F.C.
- Peter Burrow – Peterborough United F.C.
- Pilgrim Pete – Plymouth Argyle F.C.
- Boomer the Dog – Port Vale F.C.
- Nelson - Portsmouth F.C.
- Mary Rose - Portsmouth F.C.
- Deepdale Duck – Preston North End F.C.
- Jude the Cat and Spark the Tiger – Queens Park Rangers F.C.
- Desmond the Dragon – Rochdale A.F.C.
- Miller Bear – Rotherham United F.C.
- Dazzle the Lion – Rushden & Diamonds F.C. 2001
- Scunny Bunny – Scunthorpe United F.C.
- Barney the Owl – Sheffield Wednesday F.C.
- Ozzie the Owl – Sheffield Wednesday F.C.
- Captain Blade – Sheffield United F.C
- Lenny the Lion – Shrewsbury Town F.C.
- Mrs Lenny – Shrewsbury Town F.C.
- Elvis J Eel – Southend United F.C.
- Sammy the Shrimp – Southend United F.C.
- Super Saint and Sammy Saint – Southampton F.C.
- Pottermus Hippo – Stoke City F.C.
- Pottermiss Hippo – Stoke City F.C.
- Samson and Delilah (black cats) – Sunderland A.F.C.
- Cyril and Cybil the Swans – Swansea City A.F.C.
- Rockin' Robin – Swindon Town F.C.
- Gilbert the Gull – Torquay United F.C.
- Chirpy the Cockerel and Lily the Chicken – Tottenham Hotspur F.C.
- Rover the Dog - Tranmere Rovers F.C.
- Harry the Hornet – Watford F.C. 2000
- Swifty – Walsall F.C.
- Baggie Bird – West Bromwich Albion F.C.
- Boiler Man – West Bromwich Albion F.C.
- Bubbles the Bear and Hammerhead – West Ham United F.C.
- Herbie the Hammer – West Ham United F.C.
- Bodger - Wycombe Wanderers F.C.
- Wrex the Dragon – Wrexham F.C.
- Yorkie the Lion – York City F.C.

== Germany ==
- Al-Aix (a Colorado potato beetle) – Alemannia Aachen
- Atilla (an eagle) – Eintracht Frankfurt
- Berni (a bear) – FC Bayern Munich
- Betzi (the devil) – 1. FC Kaiserslautern
- Bobby Bolzer - VfL Bochum 1848
- Brian the Lion (a lion) – Bayer 04 Leverkusen
- Bulli (a bull) – RB Leipzig
- Eddi (a dog) – Hannover 96
- Eddy (a dragon) – SpVgg Greuther Fürth
- Emma (a bee) – Borussia Dortmund
- Ennatz (a zebra) – MSV Duisburg
- Erwin (a Squire, an educated miner) – FC Schalke 04
- Fiffi (an eagle) – SC Preußen Münster
- Fritzle (an alligator) – VfB Stuttgart
- Füchsle (a fox) – SC Freiburg
- Grottifant (an elephant) – KFC Uerdingen 05
- Hennes (a billy goat) – 1. FC Köln
- Hermann (a dinosaur) – Hamburger SV
- Herthinho (a bear) – Hertha BSC
- Hoffi (an elk) – TSG 1899 Hoffenheim
- Holli (a mouse) – SC Paderborn 07
- Jack (a sparrow) – SSV Ulm 1846
- Johannes (a clown) – 1. FSV Mainz 05
- Jünter (a foal) – Borussia Mönchengladbach
- Knipp-Fu Panda (a panda) – SG Wattenscheid 09
- Lauzi (a knave) – FC Energie Cottbus
- Li & La – VfL Osnabrück
- Leo (a lion) – Eintracht Braunschweig
- Lohmann (a bull) – Arminia Bielefeld
- Loki (a lion) – 1. FC Lokomotive Leipzig
- Paule (a bear) – 1. FC Heidenheim
- Pröppi (a lion) – Wuppertaler SV
- Ritter Frankie (a knight) – 1. FC Nürnberg
- Ritter Keule (a knight) 1. FC Union Berlin
- Schanzi (a dragon) – FC Ingolstadt 04
- Sechzger (a lion) – TSV 1860 München
- Stolle (a stork) – Holstein Kiel
- Tore (an elk) – VfB Lübeck
- Underdog (a mongrel dog) – Rot-Weiß Oberhausen
- Waldi (a raccoon) - Stuttgarter Kickers
- Willi Wildpark (a wild boar) – Karlsruher SC
- Wölfi (a wolf) – VfL Wolfsburg

== Greece ==
- Panathas (a lion) - Panathinaikos F.C.
- Haga (a double headed eagle) - AEK Athens F.C.
- Leone (a lion) - Olympiacos F.C.
- Paokaras (an eagle) - Paok F.C.
- Aelaras (a horse) - AEL F.C.
- Mavraetos (an eagle) - Doxa Dramas F.C.
- Leontokardos (a lion) - Panserraikos F.C.

== Guatemala ==
- Casper – Comunicaciones F.C.

== Honduras ==
- Mule – Hispano
- Green Monster – Marathon
- Blue Eagle – Motagua
- Lion – Olimpia
- Owl – Real España
- Coconut Palm – Vida
- Crab – Victoria
- Horse – Municipal Valencia
- Puma – Universidad
- Shark – Platense
- Cow – Atlético Olanchano
- Bull – Deportes Savio

== Hong Kong ==
- Bee – Lee Man
- Kit Jai (A little bluebird) – Kitchee
- Ah Pi – Pegasus
- SCAA Family – South China

== India ==
- Footzee – I-League
- Kesu (Elephant) – Kerala Blasters
- Baggu (Tiger) – Mohun Bagan
- Eddie The Eagle (Eagle) – Bengaluru FC

== Indonesia ==
- Singo Arema (Lion) – Arema F.C.
- Jalbo (Starling) – Bali United F.C.
- Bakantan (Proboscis monkey) – PS Barito Putera
- The Guardians (Pitbull dog) – Bhayangkara F.C.
- Orca (Irrawaddy dolphin) – Borneo F.C. Samarinda
- Unicorn – Dewa United F.C.
- Bogi (Buffalo) – Gresik United F.C.
- Mad Rudji (Red cow) – Madura United F.C.
- Busu Naga (Dragon) – PS Mitra Kukar
- Ki Jarwo (Horse) – Persatu Tuban
- Jojo (Crocodile) and Zoro (Shark) – Persebaya Surabaya
- Karebet – Persela Lamongan
- Prabu (Javan tiger) – Persib Bandung
- Bearman (Sun bear) – Persiba Balikpapan
- Cavallo (Horse) – Persiba Bantul
- Saga (Dragon) – Persibo Bojonegoro
- Bang J (Tiger) – Persija Jakarta
- Mapu (White tiger) – Persik Kediri
- Kumang (Black panther) – Persikabo 1973
- Si Dodi (Frog) – Persipur Purwodadi
- Arjuna (Falconidae) – Persis Solo
- Mat Peci and Ayam Wareng – Persita Tangerang
- Squalo (Shark) – PSCS Cilacap
- Mahesa Jenar – PSIS Semarang
- Rooster (Chicken) – PSM Makassar
- Falco (Javan hawk-eagle) – PSS Sleman
- Magenta Phoenix – RANS Nusantara F.C.
- Babau (Red buffalo) – Semen Padang F.C.
- Cek Emas (Eagle) – Sriwijaya F.C.
- Balo (Javan Bull) Persekat Tegal

== Iran ==
- Yupa (Cheetah) – Iran national football team

== Italy ==
- Milanello (Devil) – A.C. Milan
- Ambrogio (Biscione/Snake) – Inter Milan
- Jay Zebra – Juventus FC
- 'O Ciuccio (the Donkey) – S.S.C. Napoli
- Flaminia (Bald Eagle) - S.S. Lazio (since 2025)
- Olympia (Bald eagle) – S.S. Lazio (2010-2025)
- Skeggia (Eagle) - S.S. Lazio
- Romolo (Wolf) – A.S. Roma
- Wolf – U.S. Lecce, U.S. Avellino 1912
- Bacciccia (Sailor) – U.C. Sampdoria
- Griffon – Genoa C.F.C., A.C. Perugia Calcio
- Rooster – F.C. Bari 1908
- Bull – Torino F.C.
- Elephant – Calcio Catania
- Eagle – U.S. Palermo
- Atalanta (depicted as a blonde woman wearing a blue and black kit) – Atalanta B.C.
- Seahorse – U.S. Salernitana 1919, A.C. Cesena
- Balanzone – Bologna F.C. 1909
- Boar – Cagliari Calcio
- Mastiff – Hellas Verona F.C.
- Lion (Marzocco) - ACF Fiorentina
- Little Zebra (Zebretta) - Udinese Calcio
- Lioness - Brescia Calcio
- Anthropomorphic Leaning Tower – A.C. Pisa 1909
- Bersagliere – A.C. Reggiana 1919
- Dolphin – Delfino Pescara 1936
- Knight – Parma Calcio 1913, U.S. Cremonese
- Flying Donkey – A.C. ChievoVerona
- Devil – Foggia Calcio
- Padovana chicken/Gattamelata - Calcio Padova
- Winged Lion – F.B.C. Unione Venezia
- Anthropomorphic lion - Fidelis Andria
- Oscar, the sheepdog - Italy national football team

== Japan ==
- J.League King – J.League
- Albi-kun (Swan) – Albirex Niigata
- Ardy (Squirrel) – Omiya Ardija
- Avi (Wasp) – Avispa Fukuoka
- Blaugon (Dragon) – Blaublitz Akita
- Dio and Montes – Montedio Yamagata
- Dole-kun (Blakiston's fish owl) – Hokkaido Consadole Sapporo
- Fagimaru (Green pheasant) – Fagiano Okayama
- Fulimaru – Yokohama FC
- Fronta (Dolphin) – Kawasaki Frontale
- Gainaman – Gainare Tottori
- Gamba Boy – Gamba Osaka
- Gamity (Ostrich) – SC Sagamihara
- Gans-kun (Ptarmigan) – Matsumoto Yamaga FC
- Genzo (Golden eagle) – Zweigen Kanazawa
- Giffy (Milkvetch) – FC Gifu
- Giran (Saunders's gull) – Giravanz Kitakyushu
- Grampus-kun (Killer whale) – Nagoya Grampus
- Holly-kun (Dragon) – Mito HollyHock
- Jeffy (Akita dog) – JEF United Chiba
- Jinbenho (Whale shark) – FC Ryukyu
- Júbilo-kun (Japanese paradise flycatcher) – Júbilo Iwata
- Karara and Karappe (three-legged crows) - Japan national football team
- Kettobashi-kozo (Phoenix) – Fujieda MYFC
- King Bell I – Shonan Bellmare
- Kizuru (Paper crane) – Iwate Grulla Morioka
- Laioh (Lion) – AC Nagano Parceiro
- Lobby (Wolf) – Cerezo Osaka
- Marinos-kun, Marinosuke and Marin (Seagull) – Yokohama F. Marinos
- Moflem – Gamba Osaka
- Movi (Kobe beef) – Vissel Kobe
- Neetan (Turtle) – Oita Trinita
- Orle-kun, Tamahime-chan and Iyo Kanta (Satsuma oranges) – Ehime FC
- Pul-chan – Shimizu S-Pulse
- Pursa-kun and Kotono-chan (Phoenix) – Kyoto Sanga FC
- Raika-kun – Kataller Toyama
- Redia – Urawa Red Diamonds
- Renomaru (Lion) – Renofa Yamaguchi FC
- Reverun – Tokyo Verdy
- Rey-kun – Kashiwa Reysol
- Roasso-kun (Horse) – Roasso Kumamoto
- Sancce (Asian black bear) – Sanfrecce Hiroshima
- Sanupi (Udon) – Kamatamare Sanuki
- Shikao (Deer) – Kashima Antlers
- Tokky (Monkey) – Tochigi SC
- Tokyo Dorompa (Raccoon dog) – FC Tokyo
- Vanta (Japanese flying squid) – Vanraure Hachinohe
- Vegatta (Eagle) – Vegalta Sendai
- Vent-kun (Kai dog) – Ventforet Kofu
- Verdy-kun (Andean condor) – Tokyo Verdy
- Vivi-kun – V-Varen Nagasaki
- Vorta-kun (Raccoon dog) – Tokushima Vortis
- Wintosu (Magpie) – Sagan Tosu
- Yunaiku (Satsuma dog) – Kagoshima United FC
- Yuto (Lion) – Thespakusatsu Gunma
- Zelvy (Kingfisher) – FC Machida Zelvia

== Korea Republic ==
- SSID & Seoul-i (current), Cheetah (former, Anyang LG Cheetas), Bull (former, Lucky-Goldstar FC) - FC Seoul
- Aguileon – Suwon Samsung Bluewings
- Korean Dragon - Jeonnam Dragons
- Iron Boy & Iron Girl (current), Astro Boy (former, POSCO Atoms), Mega Man-like superhero (former, 1990s), Dolphin (former, POSCO Dolphins) - Pohang Steelers
- jaju & hana - Daejeon Citizen
- Utee - Incheon United
- Victo & rica - Daegu FC
- Gamgyu-ri - Jeju United FC
- mita - Ulsan Hyundai FC
- Nighty & Search - Jeonbuk Hyundai Motors
- Heru & Bora - Bucheon FC 1995
- Baekho, the White Tiger - Korea Republic national football team

== Mexico ==
=== Mexican First Division (Liga MX) ===
- "Kin" – Mexican Football Team
- "Agüi" – América
- "Lico" (formerly) – Atlas
- "Maggi", "Fury" (currently) – Atlas
- "Blu", "Costalito" – Cruz Azul
- "Chiva Fighter", "Chiva Loca"– Guadalajara
- "Balam" – Chiapas F.C.
- "Garritas" - Club León
- "Pachus" – Pachuca
- "Camote" – Puebla
- "Gallardo" White Rooster – Querétaro
- "Guerrerito" – Santos Laguna
- "Xolo Mayor" – Tijuana
- "Diablito" – Toluca
- "Tigre de peluche" – Tigres UANL
- "Monty" (bulldog) - Club de Futbol Monterrey
- "Goyo" – UNAM
- "Tiburcio" - Tiburones Rojos de Veracruz (Red Sharks of Veracruz)
- "Super Monarca" – Club Morelia
- "Toques" – Club Necaxa

=== Mexican First A Division (Ascenso MX) ===
- "Pepe El Toro" - Club Celaya FC
- "Pepe Potro" - Atlante F.C.
- "Minero" - Mineros de Zacatecas
- "CorreFan" and "CorreKid" - Correcaminos UAT
- Golden Fish - Dorados de Sinaloa
- "Rufian" - Leones Negros U. de G.
- "Brije" - Alebrijes de Oaxaca
- "Lobo" - Lobos B.U.A.P.

== Northern Ireland ==
- Billy Blue – Linfield F.C.

== Portugal ==
- Águia Vitória the Eagle – SL Benfica
- Bessinha the Black Panther - Boavista FC
- Draco the Dragon - FC Porto
- Jubas the Lion - Sporting CP
- Bracaru the Roman Soldier - SC Braga
- Super Afonso the King D. Afonso Henriques - Vitória Sport Clube
- Castor - Paços de Ferreira
- Tubas the Shark - Rio Ave
- Vermelhinho the Kite - Desportivo das Aves
- Garras the Lion - Marítimo
- Tubazu the Shark - Os Belenenses
- Fintas the Bat - Académica Coimbra
- Billas the Fox - Feirense
- Rooster - Gil Vicente
- Bicas the Canary - Estoril Praia
- Dolphin - Vitória Futebol Clube

Some images of the mascots

== Saudi Arabia ==
- Falcon – Saudi Arabia national football team
- Knight – Al Nassr FC
- Shark – Al Hilal SFC

== Scotland ==
- Hoopy the Huddle Hound – Celtic F.C.
- Baxter the Bridie – Forfar Athletic F.C.
- Sammy the Scurry – Peterhead F.C.
- Angus the Bull – Aberdeen F.C.
- Donny the Sheep – Aberdeen F.C.
- Si the Seagull – Aberdeen F.C.
- Cappie the Cat – Greenock Morton F.C.
- Pandamonium – Ayr United
- Sammy the Tammy – Dunfermline Athletic F.C.
- Rocky the Rooster – Airdrieonians F.C.
- Tynie Tigers – Heart of Midlothian F.C.
- Jock the Jambo – Heart of Midlothian F.C.
- Harry the Hippo – Queen's Park F.C.
- Zed the Zebra – East Stirlingshire F.C.
- Dougie the Doonhamer – Queen of the South F.C.
- Monty Mole – Montrose F.C.
- Livi Lions – Livingston F.C.
- Captain Conker– Kilmarnock F.C.
- Paisley Panda – St Mirren F.C.
- Sunshine the Leith Lynx – Hibernian F.C.
- Super Saint – St Johnstone F.C.
- Terry the Terror – Dundee United F.C.
- Hammy the Hamster – Hamilton Academical F.C.
- Claret – Motherwell F.C.
- Amber – Motherwell F.C.
- InverNessie – Inverness Caledonian Thistle F.C.
- RossCo the Staggie – Ross County F.C.
- Pelé the Elephant – Dumbarton F.C.
- Roary – Raith Rovers F.C.
- Bino Bear – Stirling Albion F.C.
- Kingsley – Partick Thistle F.C.
- Jaggy MacBee – Rossvale F.C. Junior team
- Wally the Warrior – Stenhousemuir F.C.
- DeeWok – Dundee F.C.
- Eric the Eagle – East Fife F.C.
- Fergus the Fox – Falkirk F.C.
- Bluebell the Coo – Cowdenbeath F.C.
- Broxi Bear – Rangers F.C.
- Roary – Scotland national team

== Slovenia ==
- Domži - NK Domžale
- Grofek - NK Celje
- Ligi - NK Rudar Velenje
- Petko the Eagle - NK Drava
- Zmajček - NK Olimpija

== Spain ==
- CAT - FC Barcelona
- Clam (one-eyed human figure) - FC Barcelona (former, mascot of the Centenary in 1999–00 season)
- Indi (raccoon with a Cherokee war bonnet) - Atletico de Madrid
- Locco (a heart with arms and feet) (former) - Sevilla FC
- Perico and Perica (a parakeet couple) - RCD Espanyol
- Palmerín (a palm) - Real Betis
- Super Rat Penat (a bat) - Valencia CF
- Leo (a lion with crown and cape) - Real Zaragoza
- Pucelo (former, a castle merlon) - Real Valladolid (former)
- Pepe Zorrillo (literally Pepe the skunk) (a red fox dressed as a knight and a recorder player) - Real Valladolid (current)
- Groguet (an anthropomorphic submarine) - Villarreal CF
- Bokeman (a sardine) - Malaga CF
- Datigol (a red fox) - Elche CF
- Pachón el mono (literally Pachón the monkey), a proboscis monkey (Nasalis larvatus)- Getafe CF
- Zete (a bat) - Albacete Balompié
- Harrotxu (a lion)(former) - Athletic Bilbao
- SAM (a lion) Athletic Bilbao
- Atotxo (a superhero) - Real Sociedad (former)
- Txurdin (a football with arms, legs and a crown, Stitch’s friend) - Real Sociedad
- Rojillo and Rojilla (a human couple wearing a red and black uniform and a Txapela (the basque beret) - CA Osasuna
- Gelu and Gelin (two angels) - Real Oviedo (former)
- Garra, a brown bear (Ursus arctos) - Real Oviedo
- Blau and Grana (two frogs) - Levante CF
- Tula, the cow - Racing Santander
- Pica Pica, the bee stinger (former)- Rayo Vallecano
- Babazorro (a red fox, an organ grinder and the smallest of all mascots. He plays the barrel organ) - Deportivo Alavés
- Celestino - Celta Vigo (former)
- El Jabato (a boar) - Mirandés CF
- Dimonio (a devil) and Angelo (an angel) - RCD Mallorca
- Nocho (a seagull with a horned helmet) - Celta Vigo (former)
- Sisa (a fly) - Girona FC
- Koki, the crocodile - Cordoba
- Pio Pio, the canary bird - UD Las Palmas
- Ferreret - CD Atlético Baleares
- Ruralito (an anthropomorphized wheat plant, based on Caja Rural's logo) - Zamora CF
- Romanito (a Roman soldier) - UD Mérida
- Pimentin (a white and red pepper) - Real Murcia
- Sumi, the submarine - FC Cartagena
- Nasticus (a Roman soldier) - Gimnastic de Tarragona
- Elio-Doro, the elephant - CD Tenerife
- Roelio, the bone - Pontevedra CF
- Quillo (a man with Xerez uniform) - Xerez CD
- Superpepino, the cucumber - CD Leganés
- Pulevín/Max, an Iberian lynx (Lynx pardinus) - Granada CF and Puleva
- Eskorpius, the scorpion - Orihuela CF
- Gualdy, the wolf - Barakaldo CF
- TiVo, the bat - Alcoyano CF
- Teo Maximo (an eagle dressed as a Roman soldier) - Gimnástica Segoviana
- Akarón, the horse - Narón BP
- Rozam, the lion - UD Almería
- Balastero, the bear - Palencia CF
- Miradin (an anthropomorphic scoreboard tower) - Algercias CF
- Señor Gol (a figure with a football as head and a hat) - CD Logroñés
- Narita (mascot of human female nerd) - SD Logroñés
- Yeti - Burgos FC
- Brujin, the wolf - Sporting Gijón
- Capi - LFP-Liga Profesional de Fútbol (a capybara?)
- Goli, the dog - LFP-Liga Profesional de Fútbol (former, lasted 1991–95 seasons)
- Estrellito, the star - LFP-Liga Profesional de Fútbol (former, 1998–99 season)
- Manolo el del Bombo (literally Manolo the bass drummer (died in May 2025)- Spain national football team (unofficial)
- Lobogodo and Visigol (two Iberian wolves dressed as visigothic knights. Lobogodo has turquoise blue eyes and howls when they score a goal, while Visigol has hazelnut brown eyes and he blows a Viking horn when the Visigoth team scores a goal) - Visigodos CF

OBS: Real Madrid, Deportivo La Coruña, UD Salamanca, CF Numancia and are the only clubs that do not have an official mascot.

== Thailand ==
- Shark – Chonburi F.C.
- Angel – Bangkok United F.C.
- Singha – TTM Phichit F.C.

== Turkey ==
- Black eagle – Beşiktaş J.K.
- Canary – Fenerbahçe
- Lion – Galatasaray
- Crocodile – Bursaspor
- Tiger and European anchovy – Trabzonspor
- Rooster – Denizlispor
- Double-headed eagle – Konyaspor
- Seagull – Sarıyer S.K.
- Hawk – Gaziantepspor

== United States ==
Major League Soccer

- Spike The Dog – Atlanta United FC
- Heron - Inter Miami
- Sparky the Dalmatian – Chicago Fire
- Talon the Eagle – D.C. United
- S.C. & Crew Cat – Columbus Crew
- Leo the Lion – Real Salt Lake
- Tex Hooper the Bull – FC Dallas
- Kingston the Lion – Orlando City SC
- Cozmo – LA Galaxy
- Rapidman – Colorado Rapids
- Dynamo Diesel – Houston Dynamo
- Slyde the Fox – New England Revolution
- Q – San Jose Earthquakes
- Timber Joey – Portland Timbers
- Blue the Dog – Sporting Kansas City
- PK (called "Fut Fut" by fans) – Minnesota United FC
- Phang – Philadelphia Union
- Gary the Lion – FC Cincinnati
- Sammy the Sounder – Seattle Sounders FC
- Tempo the Coyote – Nashville SC
- Sir Minty – Charlotte FC
- REDD – New York Red Bulls
- Sky Scraper - New York City Football Club

Former (Major League Soccer)

- ChivaFighter – Chivas USA
- Islamico the Horse – Dallas Burn
- Dynamo the Dragon – Kansas City Wizards
- Twizzle – LA Galaxy
- Gecko – Miami Fusion
- Metro the Dog – New Jersey MetroStars
- José Clash – San Jose Clash
- Rikter the Cyberdog – San Jose Earthquakes
- Sidekick – Tampa Bay Mutiny

National Women's Soccer League

- PK the Eagle – Washington Spirit
- Supernova – Chicago Red Stars
- Cleo the Lioness – Utah Royals FC
- Diesel – Houston Dash (shared with Houston Dynamo)

Lower soccer leagues (NASL, USL, etc.)

- Chip - Rhode Island FC
- Kickeroo – Richmond Kickers
- Golazo – The Miami Football Club
- Pete the Pelican – Tampa Bay Rowdies
- Truckee – Reno 1868 FC

== Uruguay ==
- Botija, the thermos – Uruguay national football team

== See also ==
- FIFA World Cup mascot
- UEFA European Football Championship mascot
