= Carlisle City F.C. =

Association football club in England

Coordinates: 54.8772°N 2.9161°W

Carlisle City
- Full name: Carlisle City Football Club
- Nickname: The Sky Blues
- Founded: 1975
- Ground: Gillford Park, Carlisle
- Chairman: Brian Hall
- Manager: Dan Kirkup
- League: Northern League Division One
- 2025–26: Northern League Division One, 15th of 19
- Website: carlislecityfc.co.uk
| Home colours | Away colours |

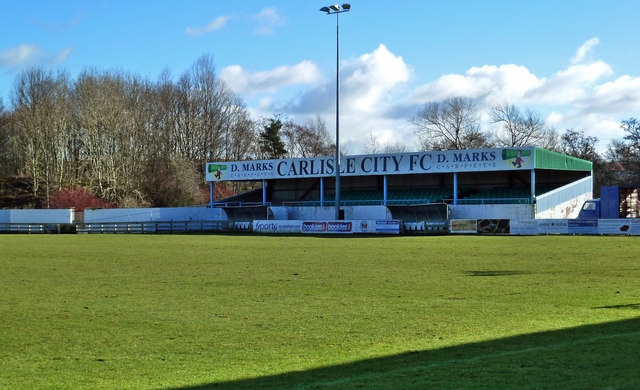
Gillford Park

Carlisle City Football Club is a football club based in Carlisle, Cumbria, England. They are currently members of the Northern League Division One and play at Gillford Park.

== History ==
The club was formed in 1975 by two former Carlisle United players, George Walker and Ron Thompson "to give local lads somewhere to play". They joined the Northern Alliance, and were runners-up in 1976–77 and 1977–78, and again in 1979–80.

After finishing bottom of the league in 1986–87, Carlisle left the Northern Alliance to join the Northern Combination. However, at the end of the 1987–88 season the Combination merged into the Northern Alliance, with Carlisle rejoining to become founder members of the new Division One. In 1991–92 they were Division One champions, earning promotion to the Premier Division. The club were subsequently Premier Division runners-up in 1993–94, 1995–96, 2002–03, 2013–14 and 2014–15. After finishing third in 2015–16, they were promoted to Division One of the North West Counties League.

At the end of the 2018–19 season, the club were transferred to Division Two of the Northern League. The club won the Division Two title in the 2021–22 season, earning promotion to Division One.

== Ground ==
In 2015 the club took over the lease of Gillford Park from Celtic Nation, allowing them to move up to the North West Counties League.

== Honours ==
- Northern League
  - Division Two champions 2021–22
- Northern Alliance
  - Division One champions 1991–92
- Cumberland Cup
  - Winners 1975–76, 1976–77, 2003–04, 2021–22, 2024–25, 2025–26

== Records ==
- Best FA Cup performance: First qualifying round, 1976–77, 1977–78, 1978–79, 1979–80
- Best FA Vase performance: Third round, 1976–77, 2023–24, 2024–25
- Record attendance: 708 v Carlisle United, 8 July 2017

== See also ==
- Carlisle City F.C. players
