= Judas (2004 film) =

American TV film

- Written by: Tom Fontana
- Directed by: Charles Robert Carner
- Starring: Johnathon Schaech; Jonathan Scarfe; Tim Matheson; Fiona Glascott; Owen Teale; Bob Gunton
- Theme music composer: Bill Conti
- Country of origin: United States
- Original language: English

Production
- Producer: Ann Wingate
- Cinematography: Michael Goi
- Editor: Raúl Dávalos
- Running time: 90 minutes

Original release
- Network: ABC
- Release: March 8, 2004

Judas is a 2004 American biblical television drama that premiered on the American Broadcasting Company (ABC) network on March 8, 2004. Written by Tom Fontana and directed by Charles Robert Carner, the 90-minute film retells the life and death of Judas from the traitor-apostle's own perspective, with Johnathon Schaech in the title role and Jonathan Scarfe portraying Jesus.

== Plot ==
Judas meets Jesus and at first does not know what to make of him or whether or not to trust him. A cynical city boy, Judas makes fun of the country bumpkin disciples who follow Jesus but eventually decides to join the band, as well.

He and Jesus become good friends, even though they often see things very differently. Ultimately, Judas is convinced that Jesus needs to use his popularity and wonder-working powers to free the Jews from the Romans, and Jesus sees a larger, spiritual perspective. As a friend, Judas convinces Jesus to give his disciples his miraculous powers, and he does with good results.

Finally, the Jewish leaders spy on Judas and convince him of the greater good of betraying Jesus, in order to save the Jewish people. Judas gets caught between the corrupt leaders – Caiaphas and Pontius Pilate – and Jesus.

== Cast ==
- Johnathon Schaech as Judas Iscariot
- Jonathan Scarfe as Jesus of Nazareth
- Tim Matheson as Pontius Pilate
- Fiona Glascott as Claudia Procles
- Owen Teale as Flavius
- Bob Gunton as Caiaphas
- Mark Womack as Peter
- Rory Kinnear as Andrew
- Enzo Squillino Jr. as James
- Harry Peacock as John
- Paul Haigh as Matthew
- Georgia Mackenzie as Mary Magdalene
- Aidan McArdle as John the Baptist
- Diane Keen as Mary, Mother of Jesus
- Philip Dunbar as Herod
- Aziz El Hattab as Bartholomew
- Hicham Bahloul as Thomas
- Hasna Tamtaoui as Martha
- Fatiha Quatili as Mary of Bethany
- Housseine Dejjiti as Lazarus
- Mohamed Khayi as Jemes
- Omar Lahlou as Simon

== Production ==
Judas originated with Paulist Productions founder Father Ellwood “Bud” Kieser, who conceived a script exploring the psychological roots of betrayal; the project was completed posthumously by Fontana and producer-priest Frank Desiderio.

It was originally slated to be titled, Judas and Jesus. One source stated of the film that "The ABC television network tried to cash in on the craze for The Passion of the Christ". /> ABC kept the finished telefilm on the shelf for two years until the box-office success of The Passion of the Christ (2004) created a marketing opportunity for religious programming.

The film was shot in Ouarzazate, Morocco.

== Reception ==
Critical reaction was mixed. The Los Angeles Times judged the film “fun to watch” as “well-intended Christian kitsch,” while noting deliberate anachronisms and “arm-chair psychology.” By contrast, New York magazine's John Leonard found the dialogue “flabbergasting,” singling out Pilate's slangy outbursts as emblematic of the script's tonal collisions. Religious press responses highlighted the film's avoidance of antisemitic tropes and restrained violence relative to Gibson's feature.

== See also ==
- 2004 in American television
- List of foreign films shot in Morocco
