= Malcolm Poskett =

English footballer

Malcolm Poskett (born 19 July 1953, Middlesbrough) is an English former footballer who played as a forward.

After being on the books of Middlesbrough, Poskett moved to non-League side Whitby Town before joining Hartlepool United in 1976 before moving on to Brighton & Hove Albion and then Watford, maintaining a good scoring rate throughout.

Poskett joined Carlisle United in 1982 and at that time had and it is here that he achieved most renown in the Second Division under manager Bob Stokoe. During the 1983–84 season Carlisle emerged as promotion contenders but failure to win their final 10 games saw them finish 7th. He joined Darlington in 1985 before moving on to Stockport County, but returned to Carlisle in 1986 where he although his scoring form continued in his second spell, the team suffered relegation to the Fourth Division and he left the club in 1988. He then played for Morecambe.
