= Jünter =

German football mascot

Jünter is the official mascot for the German football club Borussia Mönchengladbach since 1998.

It is named after Borussia's legendary player Günter Netzer — his first name Günter (German pronunciation: [ˈɡʏntɐ]) is pronounced like "Jünter" (German pronunciation: [ˈjʏntɐ]) in the local idiom.

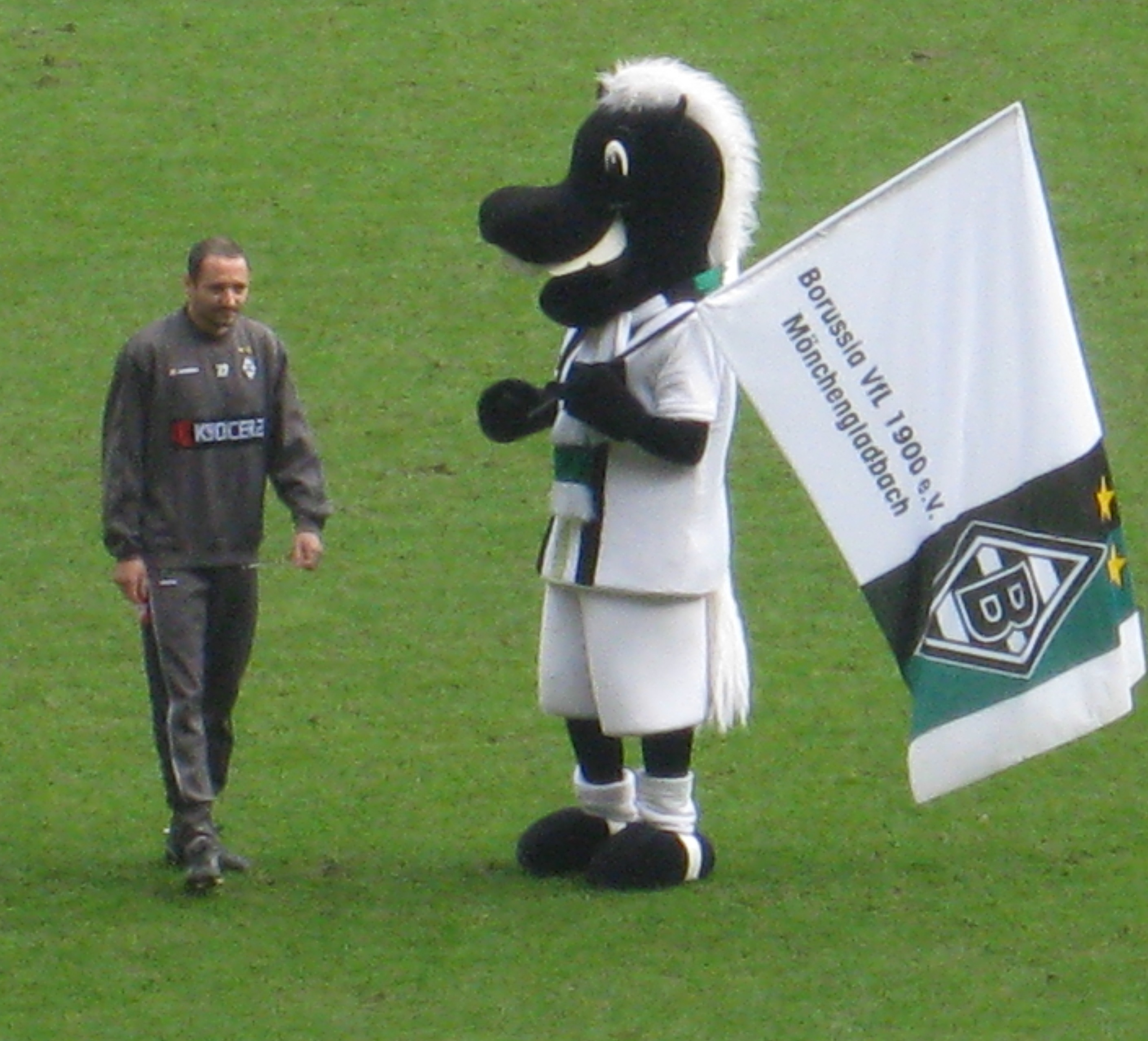
Jünter and Oliver Neuville (2009)

He is a person dressed in a large foal costume, wearing the team's football kit with the number 10 over the costume.

He takes part in the pre-match proceedings, attempting to get the crowd going. He has a column in the club's magazine “Fohlen-Echo”, where he gives his view on current football related topics. He also has the section “Jünter hat's gesehen” (“Jünter saw it”) on the club's homepage, where current or historical matches are reviewed.

== See also ==
- List of association football mascots
- Official team site in German and English
