= Cyril the Swan =

Mascot of Swansea City AFC

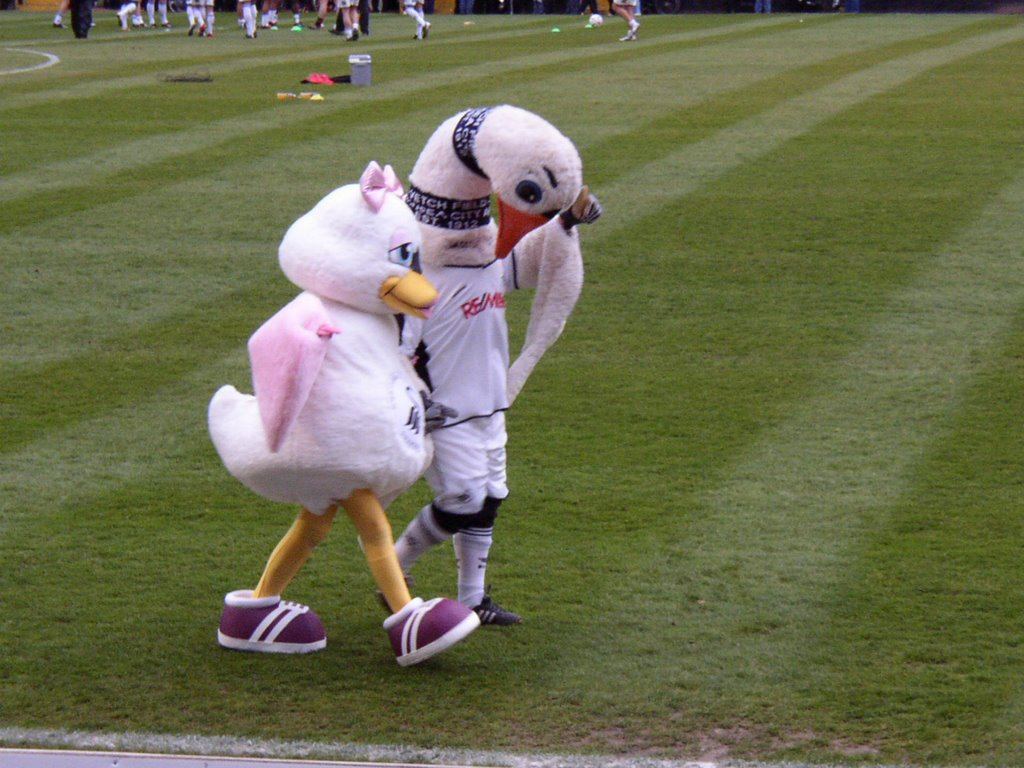
Cyril the Swan with his wife, Cybil

Cyril the Swan is a fictional giant swan, the official mascot of Swansea City A.F.C. since 1998.

Cyril was voted Best Mascot by readers of the BBC's Match of the Day magazine. His antics have got him into trouble with the police on several occasions (mainly for fighting with other mascots and stewards), and he has been accused of bringing the game into disrepute.

Highlights of his troublesome antics include removing the head of Millwall mascot Zampa the Lion, and drop-kicking it along the ground. On a Dutch TV documentary, when asked what he said to Zampa he replied "Don't fuck with the Swans". The Swan was fined £1000 for the incident.

Cyril appeared as the pet of the Emperor of China, in a British pantomime of Aladdin. As a mute swan, he does not give interviews.

Adrian Nielsen of Clubmascots created Cybil the Swan who married Cyril at the Vetch field on 2 April 2005, which led to Clubmascots producing a range of soft toys and merchandise in time for the move from the Vetch to the new Liberty Stadium; since then a full range of sports merchandise has been available for sale through the Swans shop.

== See also ==
- List of association football mascots
