= George Walker (footballer, born 1934) =

English footballer

Personal information
- Full name: George William Walker
- Date of birth: 30 May 1934
- Place of birth: Sunderland, England
- Date of death: 8 August 2012 (aged 78)
- Place of death: Carlisle, England
- Position: Inside forward

Senior career*
Years	Team	Apps	(Gls)
–	Chippenham Town		
1956–1959	Bristol City	15	(5)
1959–1963	Carlisle United	164	(53)
1963–19??	Morecambe		
- * Club domestic league appearances and goals

George William Walker (30 May 1934 – 8 August 2012) was an English footballer who played as an inside forward. He scored 58 goals from 179 appearances in the Football League for Bristol City and Carlisle United before injury ended his career.

== Life and career ==
Walker was born in Sunderland. While doing his National Service, he played non-league football for Chippenham Town before signing for Second Division club Bristol City in May 1956. He scored twice in 17 senior appearances, of which 15 were in the league, before returning to the north of England to join Carlisle United of the Fourth Division on 2 March 1959 for a £1500 fee.

He made his debut the following day, and scored twice as Carlisle beat Oldham Athletic 3–0. He continued as a regular in the first team, scoring 58 goals from 177 appearances in all competitions (53 from 164 in the league). Walker was the club's top scorer in both 1960–61 and 1961–62, when the team went into the last two matches of the season in sixth place, two points outside the promotion positions. He scored both goals in a 2–1 win at Doncaster Rovers and the first in a 2–0 win at home to Chester that gave Carlisle the four points they needed to overtake Bradford City and York City and make sure of their first ever promotion. His Carlisle career was ended when he broke his leg playing in a reserve match, although he was able to go back into non-league football with Morecambe.

Walker settled in the Carlisle area, where he and former teammate Ginger Thompson went into the building trade. They also founded a football club, Carlisle City, in 1975 "to give local lads somewhere to play". Walker was married to Val; the couple had three sons. He died of leukaemia in Cumberland Infirmary, Carlisle, in 2012 at the age of 78.
