= Hugh Neil =

Scottish footballer

Personal information
- Full name: Hugh Moorhead Neil
- Date of birth: 2 October 1936
- Place of birth: Cumnock, Scotland
- Date of death: 12 November 1978 (aged 42)
- Place of death: Carlisle, England
- Position: Right back

Youth career
- –1956: Lugar Boswell Thistle

Senior career*
Years	Team	Apps	(Gls)
1956–1957	Falkirk	7	(0)
1957–1960	Rangers	0	(0)
1960–1961	St Johnstone	5	(0)
1961–1969	Carlisle United	247	(2)
Total		259	(2)
- * Club domestic league appearances and goals

Hugh Moorhead Neil (2 October 1936 – 12 November 1978) was a Scottish professional footballer who played as a right back. Active in both Scotland and England, Neil made over 250 career league appearances.

== Career ==
=== Playing career ===
Born in Cumnock, Neil began his career with non-league Lugar Boswell Thistle, before playing League football with Falkirk, Rangers, St Johnstone and Carlisle United.

=== After football ===
After retiring as a player in 1969, Neil became Carlisle's chief scout.

== Death ==
Neil died on 12 November 1978, at the age of 42, following a car crash nine days previously.
