= Ron Thompson (footballer, born 1932) =

English footballer (1932–2020)

Personal information
- Full name: Ronald Thompson
- Date of birth: 20 January 1932
- Place of birth: Carlisle, England
- Date of death: 5 June 2020 (aged 88)
- Position: Wing half

Youth career
- Raffles Rovers

Senior career*
Years	Team	Apps	(Gls)
1951–1964	Carlisle United	373	(12)
- Gretna
- Penrith
Total		373	(12)
- * Club domestic league appearances and goals

Ronald Thompson (20 January 1932 – 5 June 2020) was an English professional footballer who played as a wing half.

== Career ==
Born in Carlisle, Thompson played for Raffles Rovers and Carlisle United. Thompson, nicknamed "Ginger", is Carlisle's record-holder for number of appearances in the Football League by an outfield player, making 406 appearances in all competitions. He spent his early career with the club as a semi-professional, combining his playing career with a job at an engineering company. After leaving Carlisle in 1964 after suffering an achilles injury, he later played for Gretna and Penrith.

Along with former Carlisle United teammate George Walker, he set up Carlisle City in 1975.

Thompson died on 5 June 2020 from bowel cancer.
