= CAT (mascot) =

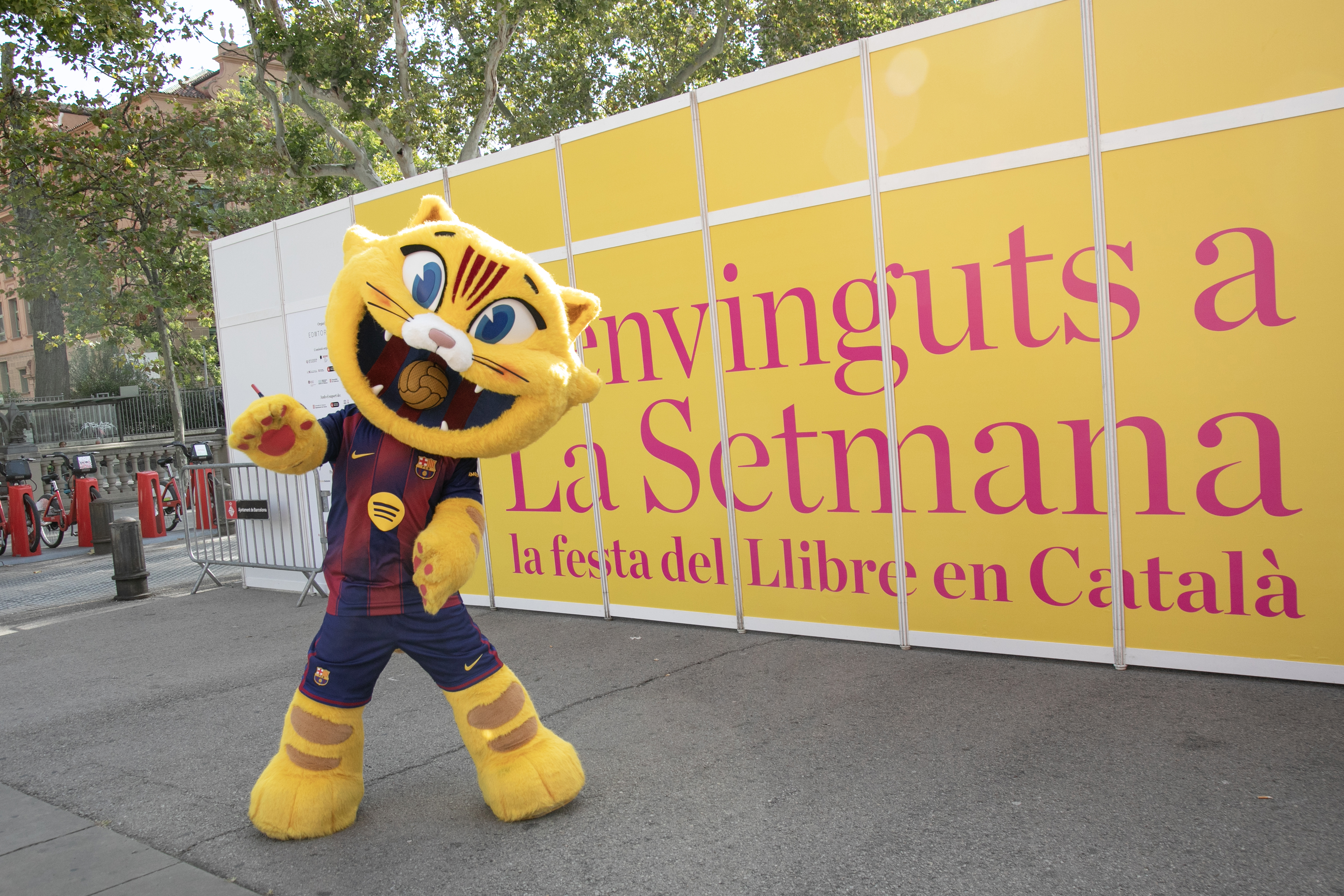
- CAT during a public event in 2025
- First appearance: 29 November 2024
- Created by: Carlos Grangel and Jordi Grangel

In-universe information
- Species: European wildcat
- Gender: Unspecified
- Affiliation: FC Barcelona
- Nationality: Catalonia

CAT is the official mascot of FC Barcelona, introduced during the club's 125th anniversary celebrations in November 2024. Designed by Jordi and Carlos Grangel of the Catalan animation company Grangel Studio, CAT represents an anthropomorphic wildcat whose appearance and symbolism intentionally evoke Catalan cultural identity.

== Background ==
Grangel Studio was commissioned to develop a character rooted in local culture yet suited for global audiences. The designers chose the Felis silvestris (European wildcat), a species native to the Montseny region of Catalonia, as the conceptual foundation.

== Presentation and debut ==
CAT was officially unveiled on 29 November 2024 at the Gran Teatre del Liceu during the club's 125th anniversary gala.

== Future developments ==
In a 2024 interview on 3CAT, Carlos Grangel revealed that preliminary discussions were underway to develop an animated film featuring CAT, aiming to expand the character beyond sports representation into entertainment media.

== See also ==
- FC Barcelona
- Catalonia
- Sports mascots
