= Paul Haigh =

English footballer

Personal information
- Full name: Paul Haigh
- Date of birth: 4 May 1958 (age 68)
- Place of birth: Scarborough, England
- Height: 5 ft 11 in (1.80 m)
- Position: Defender

Youth career
- Hull City

Senior career*
| Years | Team | Apps | (Gls) |
| 1974–1980 | Hull City | 180 | (8) |
| 1980–1987 | Carlisle United | 233 | (4) |
| 1987–1989 | Hartlepool United | 50 | (0) |
| Total | | 463 | (12) |

International career
| 1977 | England U21 | 1 | (0) |
- * Club domestic league appearances and goals

Paul Haigh (born 4 May 1958) is an English former football defender who made more than 450 appearances in the Football League.

Haigh started his career at Hull City, where he made 180 league appearances. He also represented England under-21s during his spell with the club. In 1980, he moved on to Carlisle United, making over 200 appearances before being released in 1987. He signed for Hartlepool United, and made a total of 65 first-team appearances for the club.

In the middle of the 1988–89 season he broke two bones in his back, caused by a heavy landing in an FA Cup match against Wigan Athletic, forcing him to retire from football at the age of 30. In 2009, he was working as a financial advisor.

In 2007, his son Tom signed for Hartlepool United.
