= Carlisle United F.C. =

Football club based in Cumbria, England

Carlisle United
- Full name: Carlisle United Football Club
- Nicknames: The Cumbrians; The Blues
- Founded: 1896; 130 years ago (Shaddongate United); 1904; 122 years ago (official)
- Ground: Brunton Park
- Capacity: 17,949 (Note: Temporarily reduced to 9,999)
- Owners: Castle Sports Group; (2023–present)
- Chairman: Tom Piatak
- Head coach: Rob Elliot
- League: National League
- 2025–26: National League, 3rd of 24
- Website: www.carlisleunited.co.uk
Home colours	Away colours

Carlisle United Football Club (/kɑːrˈlaɪl/ kar-LYLE, locally /ˈkɑːrlaɪl/ KAR-lyle) is a professional association football club based in Carlisle, Cumbria, England. The team currently compete in the National League, the fifth level of the English football league system.

They have played their home games at Brunton Park since 1909. The club's traditional kit is blue with white and red detail, whilst the badge takes elements from the city's coat of arms by including two Wyverns. They are nicknamed the "Blues", due to their kit, as well as the "Cumbrians". The club is the closest English professional football club to Scotland.

Formed in 1904, the club entered the Lancashire Combination the following year and were crowned Division Two champions in 1906–07. They entered the North Eastern League in 1910 and went on to win the league title in 1921–22, before being elected into the Football League in 1928. They spent the next 30 years in the Third Division North, at which point they were assigned a place in the newly formed Fourth Division, from where they won promotion in 1961–62. Relegated the following season, they then won two consecutive promotions, finishing the 1964–65 season as champions of the Third Division under the stewardship of Alan Ashman. They secured promotion out of the Second Division in 1973–74, but stayed only one season in the First Division and were relegated back to the Third Division at the end of the 1976–77 campaign. Promoted again under Bob Stokoe in 1981–82, they suffered successive relegations to return to the fourth tier by 1987.

Carlisle won promotion as champions of the fourth tier in 1994–95, but were relegated the next season, before winning promotion again in 1996–97, only to be relegated again the following year. Their 76-year stay in the Football League came to an end with relegation in 2003–04, though player-manager Paul Simpson secured an immediate return after leading United to victory in the 2005 Conference National play-off final. They then won the League Two title in 2005–06 and they remained in League One until their relegation at the end of the 2013–14 season, being promoted back to the third tier nine years later after beating Stockport County in the 2023 play-off final. The club has reached the final of the Football League Trophy six times, more than any other team, winning it in 1997 and 2011, and finishing as runners-up in 1995, 2003, 2006 and 2010.

== History ==
=== 1896–1904: Shaddongate United ===
Shaddongate United F.C. are first reported in 1896 as the winners of the Carlisle Association Charity Shield and are recorded as playing at Willow Holme in the Shaddongate area of the city, now an industrial estate, and wearing blue and gold stripes. At the time Carlisle Red Rose and Carlisle AFC were the pre-eminent clubs in Carlisle but the new club quickly gained a following and by the time Carlisle AFC folded in 1899 they were considered a force to be reckoned with. By 1903 they had overtaken Red Rose and were further cemented as the city's biggest club when Red Rose's entire team were banned for four months by the Cumberland Football Association for taking part in a Scottish amateur tournament in contravention of league rules.

A myth has persisted that Shaddongate and Red Rose had merged to form Carlisle United and this likely led the club to adopt 1904 as their official date of foundation, though Red Rose continued until 1906 at which point they folded. Only in 2017 did more information about the early part of their history come to light.

=== 1904–1928: Carlisle United ===
On 17 May 1904 at Shaddongate United's annual general meeting the club's members voted to change the team's name to Carlisle United at a heated meeting in Caldewgate, and it wasn't without its detractors. In fact, a breakaway group decided that Shaddongate United should live on and they continued to play under that name. However, they didn't have much of a local impact and their exploits have also been lost in the fullness of time. The initial idea having been proposed by Newcastle United officials who felt it would aid them when applying to regional football leagues if they represented the entire city. At the time they played at Milhome Bank and later at Devonshire Park, finally settling at their current home Brunton Park in 1909. The first ever recorded fixture that United played was on 1 September 1904 when they entertained Victoria Wanderers, another Carlisle based side, in a friendly. Wanderers would go on to win the game, played at Millholme Bank, 2–1 and, unfortunately, the scorer of that historic goal has been lost to history with his name never having been recorded.

The first ever Saturday match for Carlisle United was on 3 September 1904, and it ended in victory with a 3–1 win over Hexham. Seven days later it was Maxwelltown, just across the border, who played host in a thrilling 3–3 draw that saw both sides take and lose the lead. A final nail in the coffin for Shaddongate came when the new Carlisle United entered the Cumberland Senior League. The division had just the six teams (including fierce rivals Carlisle Red Rose) and it was to be the Roses who would inflict a first league defeat on United when they beat them 2–0 at Boundary Road. Revenge would be gained a month later when United went to the Roses ground at Maryport Cottages and beat them 2–1 in another nip and tuck match.

It was in this 1904–05 season that Carlisle United entered the FA Cup for the first time. They were drawn to play against Workington who were, at that time, the top side in Cumberland. In fact, so good were they that they comfortably held their own in the Lancashire Combination League. The cup game ended in a 2–2 draw with the West Cumbrians running out as 3–1 winners in the replay. In the Cumberland Cup United started by knocking out Frizington White Star, followed by Workington and then Keswick in the semi-final. The final, played on the Warwick Road ground, brought United and Red Rose together again, and it was the newer of the two sides who would come out on top. The 2–0 win not only handed them the Cumberland Cup, but also confirmed them as the first side to ever achieve the League and Cup double.

The remainder of the season for United was a series of friendly matches against the likes of Accrington, Darlington and Newcastle United. On Good Friday 1905 club officials pulled off a real coup when they managed to persuade Glasgow Rangers to come to the city for a game. The match was played at Warwick Road in front of a healthy crowd of 3,000, but the Gers won 2–1. Having won both the Cumberland Senior League and the Cumberland Cup in their inaugural season and been very impressed with what they had seen and heard of the Lancashire Combination League, United went in search of approval for admittance on 3 May 1905. After a two-week wait the request was rubber stamped and, along with Burnley, Bolton and Lancaster, United stepped up to a higher level of football, successfully applying to be admitted to the Second Division of the Lancashire Combination but were only admitted after agreeing to pay all visiting teams’ travel expenses for two years, due to Carlisle not being located in Lancashire. It was though a bold step for the Carlisle club who had to agree to pay the train fares for the visiting team for two seasons as well as providing them with a tea. The success of 1904–05 had resulted in the club's bank balance increasing from £24 to £90 despite the outlay of £52 on player's wages, an early sign of professionalism in the ranks. Yet this balance and more was needed to develop a new and better ground at Devonshire Park, situated off Lismore Place and Catholic Lane. A new stand seating 800 was erected and banking erected all around the playing area. The aim, as it was reported to the club's AGM, was to improve the game in the Border City. The Lancashire Combination had begun life back in 1891 with the Second Division being established in 1903. Though almost entirely composed of clubs in Lancashire, Workington had been admitted in 1904 so United were guaranteed at least one local derby fixture.

The new season's preparations also included moves to strengthen the playing staff. Several players were recruited from other local sides, not least Carlisle Red Rose, which had severe financial difficulties. Other players came from further afield including Tom Smith who arrived as both player and trainer from Preston North End, had also played for Tottenham with whom he had won an FA Cup winners medal in 1901. The Lancashire Combination era began on 2 September 1905 at home to St Helens Town. Despite two goals from Smith, the visitors won 3–2. The next game at home to Blackpool Reserves was lost 5–1 and despite a first win at Burnley, Carlisle then crashed 8–1 at Clitheroe in what proved to be almost the worst defeat of the season. Soon afterwards a new goalkeeper, James Scott, was signed from Barnsley and immediately results began to improve. Carlisle were able to sustain a mid table position for most of the season. A rare lapse came on 2 January 1906 when the trip to Brynn Central ended in an 8–0 rout, the biggest defeat of the campaign. The most convincing victory had come a week earlier on Christmas Day 1905 when Hyde St George's were thrashed 10–2. Not surprisingly Hyde were to finish bottom of the table although it was reported rather unsurprisingly that they were 'somewhat short of their strongest side' when they arrived in Carlisle. Despite this fact, a total crowd of 11,310 watched the two home games on Christmas Day and Boxing Day while a further 1,000 were said to have been admitted without paying after forcing their way into the ground.

Carlisle finished the season in 13th place among the 19 teams in the Combination. The campaign ended with four successive home matches, the last of these being the local derby with Workington. Though Carlisle were safely placed in mid table, Workington were near the top and in with a real chance of promotion to Division One. The teams had met a month earlier in Carlisle's last away match of the season which saw the Reds win 3–1. The return match at Devonshire Park attracted a gate in excess of 10,000 with receipts of no less than £208 thanks to increased admission prices. The match ended 1–1 and Workington eventually missed promotion by a single point. Financial troubles had caused Carlisle Red Rose to resign from the Cumberland Senior League the previous summer. Fortunately they were later readmitted, playing their home games at the Milholme Bank ground that had just been vacated by United. The two sides were then drawn together in the FA Cup First Preliminary Round. Carlisle United won 3–0 at Devonshire Park before losing at Barrow in the next round. It was not until the end of the season that the city's two leading sides met again. By that time Red Rose had won the Cumberland Cup Final, beating Frizington White Star who had just pipped them for the Cumberland League title. On 30 April 1906 United and Red Rose met in a friendly match in aid of the Red Rose club. The result was a 1–1 draw.

After the league reorganised four years later the board at United decided it did not suit the club's best interests to be there any longer and the club entered the North Eastern League in place of their reserve team who had previously played in the league and been a founding member. When the Carlisle United first team left to join the Football League the reserve team resumed its place in the competition. Carlisle United were crowned champions of the North Eastern League in 1922.

The 1927–28 season was Carlisle's last in the North Eastern League. An excellent home record helped them to second in the table finishing a full 10 points behind champions Sunderland Reserves. The close season meant the usual round of applications to join (and be re-elected to) the Football League. Carlisle went up against Chester, Durham City (applying for re-election), Nelson and York City. On 4 June 1928 a delegation of representatives from Carlisle United took their seats at the Football League meeting in London to hear the results of the vote. Carlisle received the second-most votes with 33, and replaced Durham City, who had received just 11 votes, as members of the Football League.

=== 1928–1964: Football League ===
Carlisle United won their first League fixture Football League Third Division North in August 1928 with the side of Prout, Coulthard, Cook, Harrison, Ross, Pigg, Agar, Hutchison, McConnell, Ward and Watson beating Accrington Stanley 3–2. Their next game a week later was played against Hartlepools United and still stands to this day as their record victory at 8–0, though it was later equalled on Christmas Day 1952 when Scunthorpe were beaten by the same score. Carlisle finished in eighth place in their inaugural campaign which proved to be the best in the pre-war era. In 1934–35 the Club finished bottom of the table and had to seek re-election for the only time.

When the Second World War began in 1939, Carlisle United withdrew from national and regional competitions and only played local football. When the war was over the club returned to the Football League and appointed Ivor Broadis as player-manager, making him the youngest league club manager in history at just 23. He then had the distinction of becoming the first manager to transfer himself when he moved to Sunderland, he continued to live and train in Carlisle. Broadis returned to Carlisle United in 1955 an ex-England international.

In 1949, the club became the first to appoint Bill Shankly as manager. Shankly, a former player at Carlisle, later went on to manage local rivals Workington (helping them finish above Carlisle for the first time) before being appointed as manager of Liverpool in 1959; over the next 15 years he would guide that club to numerous trophy successes. It is at Carlisle where he met local player Geoff Twentyman, who he would later sign as head scout at Liverpool, and lifelong friend Ivor Broadis. Broadis, who was playing for Sunderland but living and training with Carlisle, once arrived late for training and Shankly asserted that he would play by United's training rules even if he didn't play there. According to Shankly, he said to Broadis: "What do you think you're doing? Who do you think you are? If you do the training we do you can train with us and we'll play five-a-side and you'll run your guts out as an example to everybody else".

Carlisle were members of the Third Division North until 1958 when it combined with the Third Division South to become the Fourth Division. They remained there until 1962 when they won their first promotion, they were relegated the following season but immediately bounced back to begin the most prosperous period in the club's history.

=== 1964–1985: Golden era ===
Upon gaining promotion to the Third Division in 1964 United immediately won the Third Division Championship the following year. In the period which followed Carlisle enjoyed their greatest success outside of cup competitions. Over 12 years the club cemented themselves as a solid Second Division (then the second tier in English football) side. Within that period Carlisle finished seven out of 11 seasons in the top half of the table including third in 66–67, fourth in 70–71 and a third in 73–74 which saw them promoted to the top tier of English football. The end of the 71–72 season also saw Carlisle play their only European competition in the club's history, the Anglo-Italian Cup, and in June 1972 they beat A.S. Roma 3–2 at the Stadio Olimpico in Rome.

Playing in the First Division for the 1974–75 season, Carlisle won their first three fixtures (including 1–0 against Tottenham Hotspur before 18,426 spectators) to go top of the English football pyramid, partly due to the likes of Chris Balderstone, scoring the penalty which put them at the top, and Bobby Parker who both went on to make at least 375 league appearances for Carlisle. The success was short lived however, they finished the season in bottom place and were relegated. Highlight victories include doing a double over Everton, and home victories over eventual champions Derby County, and former title holders Ipswich Town, Arsenal, Burnley, Tottenham Hotspur and Wolverhampton Wanderers.

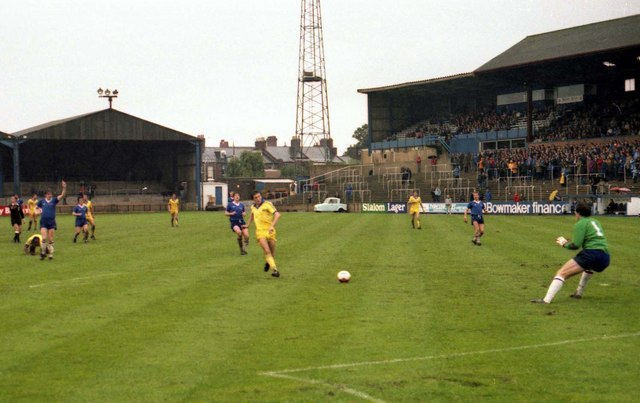
Carlisle missed out on the Third Division title in 81–82 by goal difference alone.

Bill Shankly, an FA Cup and League Championship winning manager by that time, branded Carlisle's climb to the top as "the greatest feat in the history of the game."

After Carlisle's brief taste of life in the First Division, the Club found themselves struggling in Division Two, and another relegation followed in 76–77 returning to the Third Division first time in 13 years.

Their top-flight journey three years earlier had faded into memory and, though a handful of their First Division squad remained, these were not such glorious times for the Cumbrians. It was Bobby Moncur's first full season in charge in 1977–78, the Newcastle legend having succeeded reluctant boss Dick Young the previous autumn. Carlisle never managed to hit any sort of winning stride and found their campaign studded with draws. The FA Cup had brought some respite from the mundane: Carlisle encountered Manchester United in the Third Round, following a decent spell of winter form. A 1–1 draw at Brunton Park is also remembered for the controversial decision not to award the Blues a second-half penalty, and eventually they bowed out with a 4–2 defeat in the Old Trafford replay. By the spring they had also seen the departure of their most dangerous player: striker Billy Rafferty, who was sold to Wolves. United had replaced him with Portsmouth's David Kemp. Carlisle would settle the season with a 13th-placed finish.

After another campaign in the Third Division finishing sixth place in the 1978–79 season. Carlisle went into the start of the 1979–80 season struggling for consistency but looked to climb up the divisions with 22-year-old York City striker Gordon Staniforth arriving for £120,000 in October, making him the club's most expensive purchase at the time. Staniforth would join Paul Bannon and the emerging Peter Beardsley with a fresh attacking impetus. By the time Sheffield United visited in November in front of a 6,347 crowd they had found a degree of better form, winning 1–0. If these were new beginnings for Staniforth, though, they also proved the start of the end for Moncur. Three months after the Sheffield United win, the boss departed Brunton Park to take the top job at Hearts. That left Martin Harvey in caretaker and subsequently permanent charge as Carlisle finished sixth, the same as the previous season.

The 1980–81 season had started badly, it had been the first calendar year in which United had employed three different managers, Bob Moncur having left for Hearts in February, Martin Harvey steering the ship to September, then Bob Stokoe moving back in for a second spell. Carlisle hit by some key departures including Mike McCartney, Steve Ludlam and the earlier exit of Phil Bonnyman. Carlisle hosted Burnley on Boxing Day in a 3–2 victory after a Gordon Staniforth hat-trick, ending a six-game winless run. Carlisle would avoid the drop into Division Four by just a single point finishing 19th place. Returning manager Bob Stokoe would trigger another revival at the club a year later.

In 1982 Carlisle were again promoted to the Second Division under Stokoe, this time in second place in the table after a 1–0 victory at Chester in their last game of the season. A four-year sojourn in Division Two then followed, including the “nearly” season of 1983–84, when they just missed out on promotion to the top flight once again; after spending the majority of the season in a top three placing with a team including Malcolm Poskett and Tommy Craig they mounted a promotion challenge but finished seventh after a late slump.

=== 1986–2005: Doldrums ===
Carlisle ended their most prosperous period as rapidly as it had started. Back to back relegations saw them drop into the Fourth Division in 1987 for the first time since 1964. Even there, fortunes did not initially start to improve. Attendance slumped to the lowest in the club's history and only 1,287 saw the league game against Chester in May 1987 and the introduction of automatic promotion/relegation to the Vauxhall Conference posed a new threat. Carlisle's first season in there saw them finish second from bottom but 19 points ahead of relegated Newport County meant no danger of the drop.

Carlisle's league form was improved after three poor seasons and they finished 12th in Division Four in 1988–89. They reached the FA Cup third round, where their run was ended by defending league champions and eventual FA Cup winners, Liverpool. Seventeen-year-old defender Steve Harkness was sold to Liverpool at the end of the season and his place in the team was filled by Middlesbrough's Paul Proudlock.

Carlisle's progress continued into the new decade, but their play-off hopes were ended on the final day of the season by a 5–2 demolition at the hands of Maidstone United. This was a disappointing end to an encouraging season during which the Cumbrians had topped the 1989–90 Fourth Division on Christmas Day and for a while in January as well before a late slump in form cost them dearly. In the end they missed out on the play-offs due to inferior goal difference.

A promising start to the 1990–91 season suggested that the Cumbrians were finally on their way out of the Fourth Division, but a disastrous second half of the campaign saw them slump to 20th in the final table and cost manager Clive Middlemass his job in March. He was succeeded by Aidan McCaffrey, who was left needing a substantial overhaul to get Carlisle's fortunes back on track.

In 1992, Carlisle endured one of the worst seasons in their history as they finished bottom of the Fourth Division, but were lucky because the demise of Aldershot mid-season resulted in no relegation to the Conference taking place that year. A brief respite in Carlisle's decline then came when in the summer of 1992 the club was taken over by Michael Knighton, the man who had made headlines in 1989 with his failed takeover bid for Manchester United, who became chairman and chief executive of Carlisle United. Knighton purchased the entire shareholding from the former board of directors, some 75.6% of the club. The next three years saw a dramatic rise in the club's fortunes. From 1992 to 1996, some £4.5 million of investment had been provided to improve the Brunton Park stadium. A new East Stand (6,000 All Seater) was opened by Nat Lofthouse in August 1996, as the first phase of the planned 28,000 all-seater stadium. In October 1993 a club record transfer fee was paid in the first three years of Knighton's reign, acquiring a much-needed prolific goalscorer with the purchase of David Reeves for £121,000 from Notts County. The club also broke its unbeaten run of games without defeat, by setting a new record of 19 games.

Before the 1993–94 season began, Michael Knighton announced his intention to deliver Premiership football to Carlisle by 2003. He re-organised the management team to appoint Mick Wadsworth as director of coaching, while David McCreery was given the role of head coach and 38-year-old goalkeeper Mervyn Day was named as assistant coach. This season was Carlisle's best in years; they won 10 of their final 14 league games to secure the final play-off place in the recently rebranded Division Three, a year after narrowly avoiding relegations but failed to gain promotion, though their promotion dream was ended by losing to Wycombe Wanderers in the semi-finals.

The 1994–95 season was one of the club's most memorable, with the club attaining only their second championship in the club's history by topping the Third Division with a record number of points for the club, gaining some 91 points. David Reeves scored 25 league goals to help Carlisle achieve long-awaited success ending their eight-year ordeal in the league's basement division. This season also witnessed the club's first appearance at Wembley in the Auto Windscreens Shield Final against Birmingham City, with a record crowd, for this competition, of 76,663. A nail biting finish went into extra time and history was made again when the Golden Goal principle was used for the first time at Wembley to decide the winner, when Birmingham scored to gain a 1–0 victory.

In 1995–96 with new found Division Two status Carlisle were favourites to win the championship. However, profound disappointment materialised during that season, which culminated in a controversial relegation back to Division Three. The re-arranged Brighton vs York fixture was completed after the formal season had finished. York knew in advance that they only needed to win or score three goals to survive the drop themselves, and won 3–1 at the Goldstone Ground, sending United back to Division Three. Knighton threatened to sue the League, unless it adopted a more acceptable code of practice, to avoid such occurrences in the future. Mervyn Day became director of coaching following the departure of Mick Wadsworth, who left the club in January 1996 for First Division Norwich City, only to remain for a few months at Norwich before he left by "mutual consent"; Wadsworth found himself back in the Third Division as manager of Scarborough F.C.

The opening campaign of the 1996–97 season suggested that the club could well be in the running to bounce back to Second Division status at the first attempt. The club gained promotion at the first attempt and returned to Division Two and gained an automatic promotion spot. Carlisle finished third behind Wigan Athletic and Fulham, with Wigan promoted as champions. Carlisle, also made their second visit in three years to Wembley, by reaching the Football League Trophy final against Colchester. A fairly tense, equal affair saw the game burst into life in extra time. The match ended with a thrilling penalty shoot out, Carlisle found themselves trailing 3–1 on penalties until Cumbrian Tony Caig pulled off two truly brilliant penalty saves to leave the club captain, Steve Hayward, with the last penalty kick to score and carry the day. He scored to see the club win 4–3 on penalties and make history for the club by lifting a winners' trophy at Wembley for the first time.

With promotion gained at the first attempt and returned to Second Division status for the 1997–98 season. The disappointing form from last season would continue, picking up just one win out of the first six games, and taking the previous 12 games from last season into account it showed a poor performance of picking up just five wins in 18 matches. Mervyn Day was relieved of his duties, and the coaching team comprising Michael Knighton, David Wilkes and John Halpin took charge of first team affairs. Paul Devlin was recruited as community officer in the place of John Halpin. The main objective for the new coaching staff for season 1997–98 was to maintain Division Two status. Unfortunately this was not to be, and the club finished 23rd in the table. Knighton sold the club soon afterwards, and Carlisle entered another period of strife and struggle.

In the 1998–99 season Carlisle found themselves in their second successive relegation battle. With Peter Beardsley still unable to make up his mind whether he wished to join Carlisle as team coach, it was left with the Wilkes and Halpin partnership to steer the club forward. After a mixed start the team really began to play quite well throughout the end of September and October. In December Michael Knighton appointed former Middlesbrough captain, Nigel Pearson as manager. Nigel Pearson came on strong recommendation to Carlisle with glowing references from the likes of Howard Wilkinson and Ron Atkinson, two of his former managers. However, it is fair to describe that his period in charge as nothing short of disastrous, picking up just five wins out of some 27 matches in charge.

No one could have predicted the climax to the end of yet another season. The final game of the season created one of football's folklore moments, "the great escape" game of 8 May 1999. Carlisle United needed to gain three points from the final game of the season at home to Plymouth Argyle to retain their league survival or be relegated from the Football League for the first time since 1928. Scarborough (Carlisle's relegation rival) merely needed to draw against Peterborough. News had already flashed through to Brunton Park that Scarborough had achieved all they needed to do, drawing against high flying Peterborough at the McCain Stadium 1–1 each. The score line remained 1–1 at Brunton Park on 90 minutes and the crowd at Scarborough were already celebrating before the fourth official stated four minutes of extra time would be played. In the 95th minute of stoppage, goalkeeper Jimmy Glass, who had signed in an emergency loan deal from Swindon Town after the transfer deadline, sprinted from his goal line and arrived late in the box for a corner kick. Scott Dobie's header was parried by the Plymouth goalkeeper straight to the feet of Glass, who with the last kick in the game wasted no time in the ball home. All pandemonium broke loose, a pitch invasion took place, the referee was swamped in a natured fashion, and at least three or four minutes lapsed before the referee was able to return the ball to the centre spot. The moment the referee blew the whistle to re-start the game, he also signalled the end of the match, in a survival and retention of Football League status for Carlisle. It was in many ways a finish. There had been criticism over the departure of local goalkeeping hero Tony Caig, and the incoming goalkeeper saving the club, to become a national star overnight and a folk hero.

In June 1999, Michael Knighton resigned as chairman and put his shareholding in CUFC Holdings Ltd up for sale. The forthcoming 1999–2000 season produced yet another poor performance on the field of play. Despite £1m spent on players' wages and the club retaining one of the largest playing squads in the bottom two divisions, the club narrowly escaped relegation to the conference on goal difference. Carlisle lost their final game of the season 1–0 to Brighton but were kept up by Chester City's defeat at the hands of Peterborough United. Chester City lost their league status, relegated to be replaced by Conference champions Kidderminster. Carlisle's coach, Neil Cooper had already left by early January and both replacement, Paul Baker and manager Martin Wilkinson followed suit by the end of the season.

Ian Atkins, the former Northampton Town and Chester City manager was appointed to manage team affairs for the 2000–01 campaign. Atkins was one of the most successful managers in the lower leagues, and there was much hope that he could be the man to achieve promotion. But things didn't work out and they finished 22nd, just one place higher than in the previous two campaigns. In July, Atkins quit at the end of the season to take the assistant manager's job at Cardiff and was succeeded by Roddy Collins who had inspired Bohemians of Ireland to their historic UEFA Cup wins over Aberdeen and 1.FC Kaiserslautern.

In the 2001–02 season, the Blues just manage to avoid relegation at the expense of Barnet; safety was achieved in only the second to last game of the season. Carl Heggs scored the vital goal that secured the point needed in the away game at Lincoln City. The highlight of the season was the third round FA Cup tie at home to Arsenal, the Blues made the Gunners work hard for a 1–0 victory and were unlucky not to grab a replay. Improved results on the pitch were overshadowed once again by off the field events which included a failed takeover attempt by Irish businessman John Courtenay and in April Roddy Collins became the second manager to be dismissed that season by United following a series of outbursts criticising the club's directors and overseeing Carlisle United's worst start to a season in 46 years.

For the fourth time in five seasons, Carlisle narrowly avoided relegation in the 2002–03 season. This time 22nd place was just one place above the drop zone, as this was the first season in which two clubs were relegated to the Conference instead of just one.

After frequently in the struggle to avoid relegation to the Conference, Carlisle were finally relegated in 2003–04 after 76 years in the Football League. Relegation had seemed inevitable since well before Christmas, with 18 of Carlisle's first 21 Division Three games ending in defeat. A revival followed from the next 25 fixtures under new player-manager Paul Simpson, 40 points from a possible 75 . Carlisle actually managed to finish second from bottom in the table after York City's failure to win any of their final 20 league games, with Carlisle's relegation being confirmed when they failed to win their penultimate game of the season.

=== 2005–2025: Return to the Football League ===
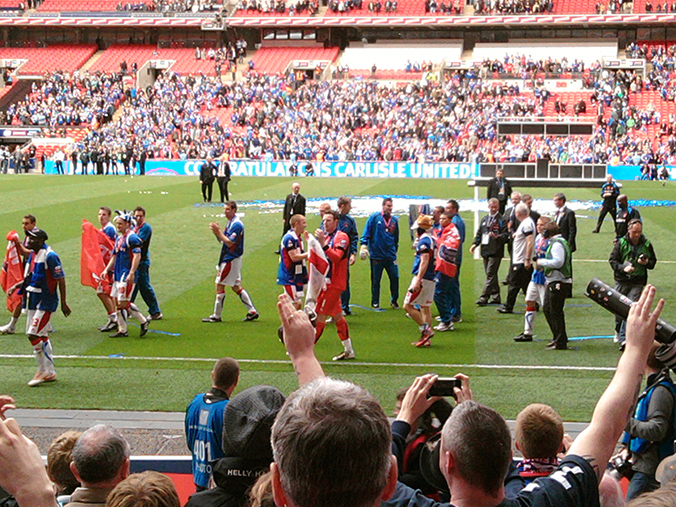
Carlisle United completing a lap of honour at Wembley after winning the Football League Trophy in 2011.

Carlisle were promoted out of the Conference at the first time of asking in 2004–05, winning the play-off final by defeating Stevenage Borough 1–0 at the Britannia Stadium. Carlisle's excellent form under manager Paul Simpson continued into the following season as they returned to the Football League with a bang, clinching the League Two title. Simpson then departed for Preston North End, and was succeeded by Neil McDonald.

In 2006–07, the club were mired in mid-table but staged a late run for a play-off place, they finally finished the season eighth, their highest league place for 20 years with the added bonus of returning their highest average league crowds for 30 years. Carlisle started the 2007–08 season with a 1–1 draw at newly promoted Walsall but manager Neil McDonald was sacked on the Monday after the match. Cheltenham Town manager John Ward took over on a permanent basis in October 2007, with both clubs agreeing a six-figure compensation package. Under Ward Carlisle were in the hunt for an automatic promotion spot but could only manage a draw on the final day of the season and finished fourth. In the play-off semi-final, Carlisle lost to Leeds United 3–2 on aggregate.

The 2008–09 season saw Carlisle start promisingly but it was soon followed by one of the worst runs of form in the club's history. Because of this manager John Ward was sacked and replaced by caretaker manager Greg Abbott, signing him permanently after he uplifted the club's form in the subsequent games. Carlisle completed two full seasons with Abbott at the helm, and achieved comfortable mid-table finishes in both. More noteworthy were the two runs in the Football League Trophy which took place in those seasons. The team were beaten in the final in 2010 but returned the following year, to win the trophy in 2011. The following season started successfully for the Cumbrians and sustained a considerable play-off push throughout the season. A dip in form towards the end of the seasons saw Carlisle miss out by two points to Stevenage.

Following a narrow 1–0 home defeat to Port Vale, Abbott's five-year reign as United manager ended. Following Abbott's sacking, assistant manager Graham Kavanagh was installed as caretaker manager, later appointed on a permanent basis. In May 2014, Carlisle were relegated having finished 22nd, ending an eight-year spell in the third tier.

In September 2014, Keith Curle was appointed as Carlisle United manager. After a poor start to the season, Curle lifted Carlisle from the foot of the table, and out of the relegation zone. However, Carlisle drifted back towards a relegation battle, only securing their Football League safety with two games to spare. The next season was a much more comfortable one but not enough for a promotion push, with the team finishing 10th. A highlight of the season was a visit to Anfield for the third round of the League Cup. Carlisle held Liverpool to a 1–1 draw, but lost 3–2 on penalties.

The first half of the 2016–17 season was excellent for the club, with just one loss in their first 23 league fixtures. However a disastrous sequence followed, with only four wins in the next 21 games. Carlisle narrowly made the play-offs but lost 6–5 on aggregate to Exeter City in the semi-final. Keith Curle left Carlisle United at the end of the 2017–18 season after over four years in charge. The 2019–20 season was cancelled due to the COVID-19 pandemic with the Cumbrians in a disappointing 18th place.

In February 2022, Paul Simpson returned as manager with the club in 23rd place. "Simmo" led the blues to eight wins, one draw and six defeats which was enough to pull the club from the relegation zone and keep Carlisle in the Football League, finishing in 20th place. After securing survival in the 2021–22 season, Simpson agreed terms on a new three-year contract as manager. In the 2022–23 season, Carlisle finished fifth, securing a play-off spot. In the play-off semi-final, Carlisle defeated Bradford City to win the tie 3–2 on aggregate. In the play-off final, the Cumbrians defeated Stockport County on penalties after a 1–1 draw to earn promotion back to League One after nine years in League Two.

The 2023–24 season was less successful. Carlisle were immediately relegated back to the fourth tier, finishing 24th, 16 points adrift of safety, with just seven victories in the league and only 30 points. A second successive relegation looked likely the following season; Simpson was sacked on 21 August 2024 after losing three of the first four league games. Then, after just five wins from 25 games, his successor, Mike Williamson, was sacked on 3 February 2025, with the club five points from League Two safety. Three days later, Mark Hughes became Carlisle's new head coach who provided vital wins, but Carlisle were relegated to the National League with one game still to play at the end of the 2024–25 season, ending a 21-year spell in the EFL dating from the 2003-04 season.

== Colours and badge ==
Carlisle United's current emblem is similar to the city's coat of arms, registered in 1924.

Upon the decision to change the name of Shaddongate F.C. to Carlisle United in 1904 the club also changed their shirt colours from gold and navy stripes to blue. In 1907 white shorts were introduced and since then various combinations of blue and white have been used by the club. In 1973 the first shirt to feature a sportswear sponsor was worn by United. Made by Admiral, the shirt was based on an earlier Birmingham City shirt and was the first to feature red detailing. Since then red detailing became a common feature on Carlisle shirts.

The first evidence of Carlisle wearing a crest dates to the 1950–51 season, first adorning it in a FA Cup tie against Arsenal. The design itself was based on the city's own coat of arms which was registered at the College of Arms in 1924. The crest itself may have been derived from Sir William de Carlyell of Cumberland, in the reign of Edward II, who bore a red cross. The supporting red wyverns to either side of the shield are a symbol of the British Kingdom of Cumbria. The motto on the underlying scroll reads: ‘Be just and fear not’, which is a quote from Shakespeare's Henry VIII.

Carlisle were often referred to as the Foxes due to the local connection with huntsman John Peel. In 1970 the club badge changed to reflect this and featured a golden fox jumping over the abbreviation C.U.F.C. The fox further became part of the club's image with a mounted stuffed fox named Olga (an anagram of "goal") which is traditionally carried onto the pitch by the mascot before the match. Later versions of this badge featured a fox's head with a castle (representing Carlisle Castle) and a fox jumping through a ring of stars, somewhat resembling the European Union emblem.

Since 1995 the club has reverted to using the city's coat of arms. However the club still sell merchandise with branding similar to their former fox badge. The club mascot (who is now Olga the Fox also) would continue the tradition of bringing the stuffed fox onto the pitch before each match, this was discontinued after flood damage suffered in 2015 caused it to rapidly deteriorate.

=== Sponsorship ===
Stobart Group, a local business, had been the club's main shirt sponsor since 1995. Before 2007 the shirt displayed the Eddie Stobart name associated with the haulage arm of the business (with the exception of the 1997–2000 shirt), in 2007 this changed to just Stobart in order to reflect the wider company. The Stobart deal ended for the 2014–15 season, ending one of the longest-running sponsorship deals in English football.

The Stobart Group have been strong supporters of the club in general. In 2010, to celebrate the company's 40th anniversary, the group bought 4,000 tickets for the League One game against Rochdale and gave them away to the general public. On 3 April 2011 Carlisle United wore black armbands in the Football League Trophy final in respect of Edward Stobart (son of Eddie), who had died three days earlier.

Period	Kit Suppliers	Shirt Sponsor
1973–76	Umbro	None
1976–81	Admiral	None
1981–82	Umbro	None
1982–88	Umbro	McEwan's Younger
1988–90	Bukta	Sealy
1990–92	Ribero	Sealy
1992–93	Matchwinner	Lloyd Motor Group
1993–95	Matchwinner	Conway Vauxhaull
1995–97	Red Fox	Eddie Stobart
1997–2000	Red Fox	Stobart
2000–02	Errea	Eddie Stobart
2002–05	Umbro	Eddie Stobart
2005–07	Le Coq Sportif	Eddie Stobart
2007–11	Le Coq Sportif	Stobart
2011–12	Carbrini Sportswear	Stobart
2012–14	Fila	Stobart
2014–16	Sondico	Virgin Trains
2016–17	Sondico	DSD Construction
2017–19	Umbro	Edinburgh Woollen Mill
2019–21	Erreà	Edinburgh Woollen Mill
2021–22	Erreà	Thomas Graham
2022–23	Erreà	Bimson Haulage
2023–24	Umbro	Bimson Haulage
2024–2026	Umbro	Aqua Pura
2026-present	Macron	Aqua Pura

== Stadium ==
As Shaddongate United the club played at two grounds, Millholme Bank, to the south of the city, and Devonshire Park, where Trinity School now stands. In 1909, five years after becoming Carlisle United, the club moved to Brunton Park and has been there ever since.

The stadium has a capacity of 18,202 and comprises both seated and terraced areas. The four stands are known as Main (West) Stand & Paddock, the East Stand, the "Waterworks" Petteril Stand and the Warwick Road End which usually hosts the most vocal supporters on match days. In the past the stadium has been the victim of severe flooding and a fire which burned down the wooden grandstand which stood until 1953.

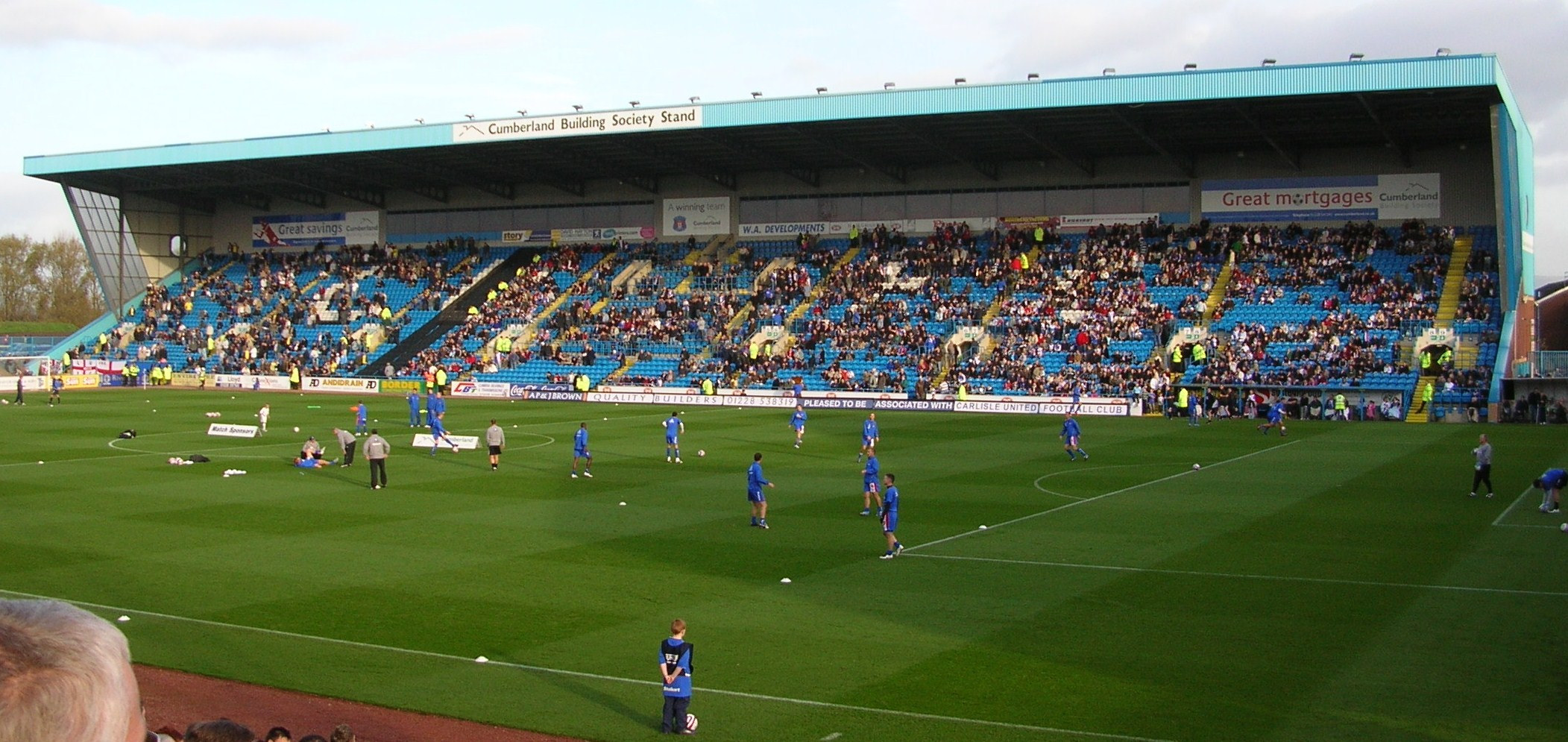
A view over Brunton park from the Paddock towards the East (The Pioneer Foods) Stand.

In 2011, a plan was introduced to move to a 12,000 capacity all-seater stadium to be built in the Kingmoor Park area of the city which was to be locally known as project Blue Yonder. Though considerably smaller than Brunton Park, the new ground could be upgraded to a larger capacity if demand was met. An extension of this 12,000 capacity is thought to rely on the club achieving promotion to the Championship. The proposals have received mixed responses from Carlisle fans. There has since been no news as to whether the project has any advancement.

In December and January of the 2015–16 season, Carlisle played their home games at Deepdale in Preston, Bloomfield Road in Blackpool and Ewood Park in Blackburn, as Brunton Park recovered from flooding caused by Storm Desmond.

In December 2021, the club announced that the stadium capacity would be temporarily reduced to 9,999, after the government required attendees at events with a capacity of greater than 10,000 to show Covid certification.

== Ownership ==
Carlisle United operates through the limited company Carlisle United Association Football Club (1921) Ltd which is currently controlled by Castle Sports Group which has a controlling 90.0% stake in the club's holding company, CUFC Holdings Ltd. A minority (10.0%) stake is held by The United Trust, formed by supporters in 2001. Castle Sports Group is owned by the Piatak Family from Jacksonville, Florida, who own several other companies, most notably Magellan Transport Logistics, which provides transportation and logistics services throughout North America.

In 1992 property developer Michael Knighton bought the club which was then playing in Division Four, the lowest tier of the Football League. Then began a 10-year ownership in which much of the talk around the club concerned Knighton himself. At one point he was even featured in the local paper claiming to have seen a UFO, local paper the News and Star ran the story with the headline: 'Knighton: Aliens Spoke To Me'.

In 1997 Knighton dismissed popular manager Mervyn Day, who had won promotion to the Second Division and the Football League Trophy earlier that year. Knighton placed himself in charge of the club's management with the uncredited help of Dave Wilkes and John Halpin. The club was relegated to the English fourth tier that season and only narrowly avoided losing Football League status due to a last minute goal by goalkeeper Jimmy Glass in 1999. Knighton became increasingly unpopular with the fans in the following years and the supporters' United Trust was formed to push for better ownership, this came in the form of John Courtenay after a seven-month battle in July 2002, ending Michael Knighton's controversial decade-long reign

Allen, the owner of a local accountancy agency, left the board acrimoniously in 2009 when he made public a feud with fellow owners on the board stating "Unfortunately, a lot of people perceive elements within Brunton Park's hierarchy as an old boys’ club that is not receptive of change. I am unhappy being associated with that as it is not my style either personally or professionally." Since Allen left the club has gone from strength to strength having two Wembley finals under their belt including winning the JPT in April 2011 also posting healthy profits. Carlisle United released plans to move to a modern all seater stadium, however these plans fell through. Recent years have seen the club stagnate and decline both in terms of league position and attendances. The club has recently gone through its longest period in history without promotion, the last being the 2005–06 season.

== Supporters and rivalries ==
The main area of Carlisle support can be found within and around Carlisle itself and, due to being the only professional football club for a long distance, it attracts fans from across the county of Cumbria, South West Scotland and parts of West Northumberland. The club's supporters are known as the Blue Army. The most vocal supporters on match days reside in Brunton Park's Warwick Road End, known affectionately to the fans as The Warwick. In addition to generic English football chants Carlisle's supporters sing "Proud to be a Cumbrian", "Super Carlisle from the North" and an adapted version of Peggy March's, "I Will Follow Him".

Carlisle's traditional rivals are Workington and Barrow. However, both clubs were voted out of the Football League in the 1970s and consequently competitive matches between the teams have been rare. Barrow were promoted back to the Football League in 2020, reinstating competitive matches between the two teams. Prior to 2008, the club's nearest professional football club was Gretna, owned by Carlisle United fan Brooks Mileson. Gretna played in the Scottish Football League however and, therefore, the chance of meeting in competitive competition remained highly unlikely. Gretna was eventually liquidated in 2008.

In 2012, market research company FFC surveyed fans of every Football League club across the country to find who they consider their main rivals to be. Carlisle United fans were unusually shown to consider the more distant Preston North End, Hartlepool United and Middlesbrough as their main rivals. This is most likely explained by the fact that the survey did not include the option of choosing non-league clubs (including Workington, Barrow etc).

== Players ==
=== Current squad ===
As of 31 October 2026

Note: Flags indicate national team as defined under FIFA eligibility rules; some limited exceptions apply. Players may hold more than one non-FIFA nationality.

No.	Pos.	Nation	Player
1	GK	ENG	Adam Desbois
2	DF	ENG	Kenton Richardson
3	DF	SCO	Cameron Harper
4	MF	ENG	Harvey Bunker
5	DF	ENG	Morgan Feeney (captain)
6	MF	ENG	Miguel Azeez
7	FW	ENG	David Ajiboye
8	MF	ENG	Callum Whelan (vice-captain)
9	FW	IRL	Georgie Kelly
10	FW	ENG	Regan Linney
11	FW	COD	Junior Luamba
12	DF	ENG	Ryan Galvin
14	MF	ENG	Elliot Embleton
15	DF	ENG	Brad Nicholson

No.	Pos.	Nation	Player
16	GK	SCO	Archie Mair
17	DF	USA	Leo Duru
18	DF	ENG	Jack Ellis
19	FW	KEN	Micah Obiero
20	MF	ENG	Stephen Wearne
22	DF	ENG	Josh Williams
25	MF	ENG	Jonah Lowes
26	DF	UGA	Bevis Mugabi
29	FW	ENG	Luke Armstrong
30	MF	ENG	Teddy Jenks
31	DF	ENG	Tom Anderson (on loan from Shrewsbury Town)
32	MF	NIR	Callum Camps (on loan from Stockport County)
37	MF	ENG	Harvey Macadam
40	DF	ENG	Toby Mullarkey (on loan from Fleetwood Town)

=== Under 18's squad players named in First Team squads ===
Note: Flags indicate national team as defined under FIFA eligibility rules; some limited exceptions apply. Players may hold more than one non-FIFA nationality.

No. / Pos. / Nation / Player; 27 / MF / ENG / Amaru Smith	No. / Pos. / Nation / Player; 33 / MF / ENG / Will Rafferty

=== Out on loan ===
Note: Flags indicate national team as defined under FIFA eligibility rules; some limited exceptions apply. Players may hold more than one non-FIFA nationality.

No.	Pos.	Nation	Player
21	DF	ENG	Hayden Atkinson (on loan to Darlington)
23	FW	ENG	Seb Mason (on loan to Stranraer)

=== Player of the Season ===
Carlisle's Player of the Season award is voted for by the club's supporters.

2001–02	(Republic of Ireland) Richie Foran
2002–03	(England) Craig Farrell
2003–04	(Republic of Ireland) Brendan McGill
2004–05	(England) Michael Bridges
2005–06	(England) Karl Hawley
2006–07	(England) Karl Hawley
2007–08	(Republic of Ireland) Keiren Westwood
2008–09	(England) Cleveland Taylor
2009–10	(Republic of Ireland) Richard Keogh
2010–11	(England) James Berrett
2011–12	(Scotland) Lee Miller
2012–13	(England) Matty Robson
2013–14	(England) David Amoo (England) Brad Potts
2014–15	(England) Kyle Dempsey
2015–16	(England) Danny Grainger
2016–17	(England) Nicky Adams
2017–18	(Republic of Ireland) Jamie Devitt (England) Clint Hill
2018–19	(England) Adam Collin
2019–20	Not officially awarded
2020–21	(England) Callum Guy
2021–22	(England) Mark Howard
2022–23	(England) Owen Moxon
2023–2024	Not officially awarded
2024–2025	Not officially awarded
2025–2026	(England) Regan Linney

== Notable players ==
=== Individual Records ===
As of 5 September 2026

All-time Top 20 club appearances
Ranking	Games played	Player's name
1	542	Alan Ross
2	448	Chris Balderstone
3	440	Bobby Parker
4	434	Peter Murphy
5	407	Ron Thompson
6	388	Terry Caldwell
7	375	George McVitie
8	324	Dennis Martin
9	318	Mike McCartney
10	310	Danny Livesey
11	296	Dean Walling
12	284	Tony Caig
13	273	Peter McConnell
14	266	Paul Thirlwell
15	265	Ivor Broadis
16	250	Trevor Swinburne
17	250	Adam Collin
18	247	Hugh Neil
19	243	Tommy Passmoor
20	233	Paul Haigh

All-time Top 20 goal scorers
Ranking	Goals	Player's name
1	132	Jimmy McConnell
2	101	Jimmy Whitehouse
3	101	Alan Ashman
4	91	Ivor Broadis
5	87	Hugh McIlmoyle
6	75	Chris Balderstone
7	74	Alf Ackerman
8	67	Davie Hutchison
9	67	Malcolm Poskett
10	65	Dennis Martin
11	63	David Reeves
12	58	George Walker
13	54	Ian Atkinson
14	53	Ian Stevens
15	51	Bobby Owen
16	51	Karl Hawley
17	45	Scott Dobie
18	44	Joe Laidlaw
19	43	Tommy Murray
20	42	Joe Livingstone

== International players ==
Former and current players who have played at full international level while with the club, ordered by year of their debut:

Northern Ireland

- Eric Welsh (1966-1967) 4 caps at club

Republic of Ireland

- Peter Murphy (2007) 1 cap at club

(Slovenia) Slovakia

- Lubomir Michalik (2011-2012) 3 caps at club 8 in total

Montserrat

- Anthony Griffith (2015) 2 caps at club 4 in total

Bermuda

- Reggie Lambe (2016-2018) 5 Caps at club 63 in total

Barbados

- Hallam Hope (2001) 4 caps at club 14 total

South Africa

- Dean Furman (2020) 4 caps at club 58 in total

Kenya

- Micah Obiero (2026 - ) 2 caps at club 4 in total

== Youth International players ==
Former and current players who have played at youth international level while with the club, ordered by year of their debut:

Wales U21

- Rob Edwards (1990) 1 Cap

Republic of Ireland U21

- Rory Delap (1996 -1998) 6 Caps

Scotland U21

- Lee Peacock (1997) 1 Cap

England U19

- Brad Potts (2012) 1 Cap

Scotland U19

- Mark Beck (2012 -2023) 3 Caps

Wales U16

- Casey Sillitoe (2024 ) 1 Cap

=== Hall of Fame ===
"A selection of the people we have all watched from the terraces, often in awe, through the ages here at Brunton Park." - carlisleunited.co.uk

(England) Alan Ashman	(Republic of Ireland) Rory Delap	(Scotland) Hugh Mcllmoyle	(Scotland) Billy Rafferty	(England) John Evans	(England) Geoff Twentyman
(England) Tony Caig	(England) Matt Jansen	(England) Alan Ross	(England) Les O'Neill	(England) Les Dagger	(England) Jimmy Whitehouse
(England) Jimmy Glass	(England) David Reeves	(Saint Kitts and Nevis) Dean Walling	(England) Steve Hoolickin	(Scotland) Hugh Neil	(South Africa) Alf Ackerman
(England) Paul Murray	(England) Ray Train	(England) Bob Stokoe	(Scotland) John Gorman	(England) Willie Carlin	(England) Eric Hayton
(England) Trevor Swinburne	(England) Mark Winstanley	(England) Alan Shoulder	(England) Tony Leach	(England) Peter McConnell	(England) John Billingham
(Saint Kitts and Nevis) Keith Walwyn	(England) Peter Beardsley	(England) George Bristowe	(England) Bob Hatton	(England) Stan Harland	(England) Billy Hogan
(England) Chris Balderstone	(England) Tony Gallimore	(England) Malcolm Poskett	(England) Stan Bowles	(Scotland) Ronnie Simpson	(Scotland) Jimmy McConnell

== Club management ==
=== Coaching positions ===
As of 22 June 2026

Role	Name
Sporting Director	(England) Marc Tierney
Head coach	(Republic of Ireland) Rob Elliot
First Team Coach	(England) Louis Storey
First Team Coach	(England) Gavin Skelton
Head of Goalkeeping	(England) Jack Cudworth
First Team Analyst	(England) Josh Lucas
Head of Sports Science & Medical	(England) Frazer Bell
Physiotherapist	
Assistant Physiotherapist	(England) Nathan Moran
Strength and Conditioning	(England) Adam Kwiecien
Head of Recruitment	
Recruitment Analyst	(England) Jacob Blain
Kit Manager	(England) Emma Maclagan
Academy Manager	(England) Andy Lowe
Head of Academy Coaching	(England) Chris Blake
Lead Professional Development Phase Coach	(England) Mark Birch
Assistant Professional Development Phase Coach	(Republic of Ireland) Jamie Devitt
Lead Youth Development Phase Coach	
Lead Foundation Phase	
Academy Goalkeeping Coach	
Academy Physiotherapist	(England) Vikki Borrill
Academy Strength Coach	(England) James Pringle
Academy Analyst	(England) Cameron Westmorland
Ladies Manager	(England) Tracy Gannon

=== Notable managers ===
The following managers have all achieved honours with Carlisle United.

- (n/a) = Information not available

Greg Abbott	England	2007 (caretaker); 2008 (caretaker); 2008–2013	Football League Trophy winners: 2010–11 runners-up: 2009–10
Paul Simpson	England	2003–2006 2022–2024	League Two winners: 2005–06 Football League Trophy runners-up: 2005–06; Football Conference play-off winners: 2004–05; EFL League Two play-off winners: 2022–23
Roddy Collins	Ireland	2001–2002; 2002–2003	Football League Trophy runners-up: 2002–03
Mervyn Day	England	1996–1997	Football League Second Division Third runners-up: 1996–97 Football League Trophy winners: 1996–97
Mick Wadsworth	England	1993–1996	Football League Second Division winners: 1994–95 Football League Trophy runners-up: 1995–96
Bob Stokoe	England	1968–1970; 1980 – 1985; 1985–1986	Football League Third Division runners-up: 1981–82
Alan Ashman	England	1963 – 1967; 1972–1975	Football League Second Division Third runners-up: 1973–74 Football League Third Division winners: 1964–65; Football League Fourth Division runners-up: 1963–64

== Honours ==
League

- Second Division (level 2)
  - Promoted: 1973–74
- Third Division (level 3)
  - Champions: 1964–65
  - Runners-up: 1981–82
- Fourth Division / Third Division / League Two (level 4)
  - Champions: 1994–95, 2005–06
  - Runners-up: 1963–64
  - Promoted: 1961–62, 1996–97
  - Play-off winners: 2023
- Conference (level 5)
  - Play-off winners: 2005
- Lancashire Combination Division One
  - Champions: 1907–08
- Lancashire Combination Division Two
  - Champions: 1906–07
- North Eastern League
  - Champions: 1921–22

Cup

- Football League Trophy
  - Winners: 1996–97, 2010–11
  - Runners-up: 1994–95, 2002–03, 2005–06, 2009–10
- Cumberland Senior Cup
  - Winners (29): 1901–02, 1902–03, 1904–05, 1908–09, 1910–11, 1912–13, 1921–22, 1923–24, 1927–28, 1928–29, 1929–30, 1930–31, 1931–32, 1932–33, 1933–34, 1938–39, 1939–40, 1979–80, 1989–90, 1992–93, 2001–02, 2004–05, 2007–08, 2010–11, 2011–12, 2012–13, 2014–15, 2018–19

=== League history ===
A chart displaying Carlisle United's season end league position from election to the Football League to present.

To date Carlisle United have played 82 seasons in the Football League, their relegation in 2004 and reinstatement the following year remains the only departure from the Football League since the club was first admitted in 1928 (excluding wartime). United are currently the only club to have reached the final of the Football League Trophy on six occasions. This, alongside their two wins, makes them the most successful club in the competition's history. The club's highest achievement outside of cup competitions came in 1974 when the club was promoted to the first tier of English football and spent a short period of time at the top of the division. Carlisle still remains the smallest location in England, by local population, to have had a resident top-flight football team since 1906.

League Timeline
Period	League
1905–06 to 1906–07	Lancashire Combination Division Two
1907–08 to 1909–10	Lancashire Combination Division One
1910–11 to 1927–28	North Eastern League
1928–29 to 1957–58	Football League Third Division North
1958–59 to 1961–62	Football League Fourth Division
1962–63	Football League Third Division
1963–64	Football League Fourth Division
1964–65	Football League Third Division
1965–66 to 1973–74	Football League Second Division
1974–75	Football League First Division
1975–76 to 1976–77	Football League Second Division
1977–78 to 1981–82	Football League Third Division
1982–83 to 1985–86	Football League Second Division
1986–87	Football League Third Division
1987–88 to 1994–95	Football League Fourth Division/Third Division (renamed in 1992–93)
1995–96	Football League Second Division
1996–97	Football League Third Division
1997–98	Football League Second Division
1998–99 to 2003–04	Football League Third Division
2004–05	Conference National
2005–06	Football League Two
2006–14	Football League One
2014–23	Football League Two
2023–24	Football League One
2024–25	Football League Two
2025–present	National League

=== Club records ===
As of 7 January 2021.

- Highest League position: 22nd in Football League Division One (1st tier), 1974–75
- Best FA Cup performance: Quarter-finals, 1974–75
- Best Football League Cup performance: Semi-finals, 1969–70
- Best Football League Trophy performance: Winners, 1996–97, 2010–11
- Best FA Trophy performance: 5th Round, 2004–05
- Best Anglo-Italian Cup performance: Group Stage, 1972
- Record Victory: 8–0 vs. Hartlepools United Division Three North, 1 September 1928
- Record Defeat: 1–11 vs. Hull City Division Three North, 14 January 1939
- Most League Goals: 113, Division 4, 1963–64
- Most Wins In a Row: 8 Wins, 1 October 2016 to 9 November 2016
- Most league goals in a season: Jimmy McConnell, 42 goals, 1928–29
- Most league goals in total: Jimmy McConnell, 126 goals, 1928–32
- Most league appearances: Alan Ross, 466, 1963–79
- Most capped player: Reggie Lambe, 5 caps, Bermuda 2016-18
- Record transfer fee: Joe Garner, £140,000 from Blackburn Rovers
- Record sale: Matt Jansen, £1.5 million to Crystal Palace
