= SCAA Family =

Mascots for South China Athletic Association

SCAA Family is a group of mascots for the Hong Kong First Division League football team South China ("SCAA"). They were officially created and released to the public on 20 September 2007. There are in total 10 members, of which 8 are named. Ballman and Greenman are the main characters.

== Characters ==
=== Ballman ===
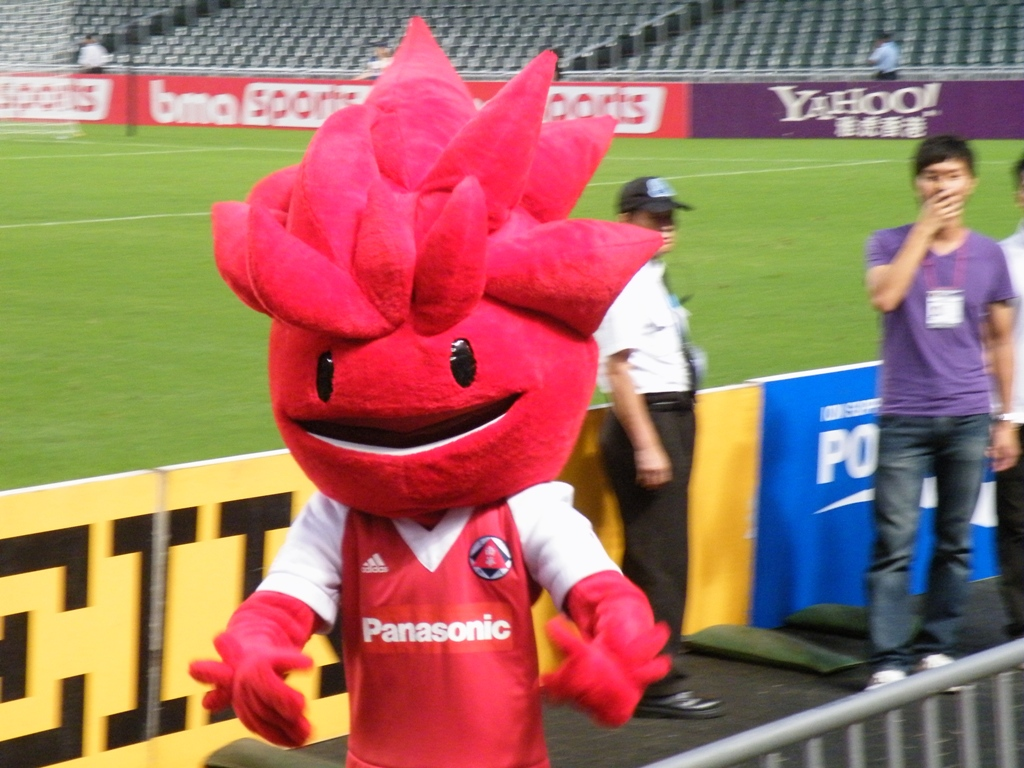
Ballman

- Name in Chinese: 波南
- D.O.B.: 1 November
- Jersey Number: 10 (Home Jersey)
- Favourite food: Banana
- Ballman's head is a burning football whose hair is on fire. He represents the fans' unstoppable love on football and the joy from watching football matches. He also symbolizes the SCAA players' attitude on the field and the spirit of fighting until the end.
- Ballman has many real-life interactions with SCAA Fans. He has his own online blog, which was opened on 11 October 2007.
- TVB artist Wong Cho Lam dubs the voice for Ballman in Ballman Blog's videos.

=== Greenman ===
- Name in Chinese: 草南
- D.O.B.: 11 January
- Jersey Number: 9 (Away Jersey)
- Favourite food: Juice
- Greenman is a good friend of Ballman and they are buddies in football field. Greenball was born from the grass and he is fresh, pure, young, energetic and full of vitality. He symbolizes the youth players of SCAA, who are full of energy and aim at becoming the next football stars of the future.
- Greenman's debut show-up was during the "Ballman & Greenman Show-up Party" held in Times Square on 26 November 2007.
- Greenman made his voice debut in Ballman Blog's video on 31 December 2007, featuring in the New Year song of Ballman. However, the voice might only be made by Wong Cho-lam, the voice maker of Ballman.

=== Whistle Sir ===
- Name in Chinese: 哨子sir
- Whistle Sir is a just and fair referee. He loves running.

=== Yellow & Red Card Brothers ===
- Name in Chinese: 紅黃牌兄弟
- Yellow & Red Card Brothers a followers of Whistle Sir and they never reject Whistle Sir's decisions.

=== Mr. Scoreboard ===
- Name in Chinese: 顯示牌先生

Mr. Scoreboard is noted for his attention to numerical data and for allocating resources.

=== Dr. First-Aid-Kid ===
- Name in Chinese: Dr.救護箱
- Dr. First-Aid-Kid loves to help others and treasures lives a lot.

=== Pong Pong Twins ===
- Name in Chinese: Pong Pong孖寶
- Pong Pong Twins are the best partners who love music and have a strong sense of rhythm. They are good at following other fans' drum beat to move their bodies.

=== Loud-Speaker ===
- Name in Chinese: 大聲公人
- Loud-Speaker loves to talk loudly and he gives loud slogans.

=== Others ===
There are 2 other unnamed characters on the poster of SCAA family.

== Souvenir Products ==
=== Key Rings ===
Members of the SCAA Fans Club who have placed an advance order for the 07/08 South China jersey will also get an SCAA Family key ring.

=== Stickers ===
On 27 September 2007, SCAA Fans Club published a SuperFan Handbook for members. Some of the contents include 07-08 match schedule, 07-08 season calendar, List of SCAA Football section members, Footballers' Group photo and stickers of SCAA Family.

=== Pong Pong Sticks ===
On 13 November 2007, people who wore red clothes for watching South China's league match against Wofoo Tai Po were given a special edition of SCAA Family Pong Pong Sticks.

=== Gashapon (Telephone Rope) ===
On 14 November 2007, BMA Marketing & Advertising Ltd issued a series of telephone ropes for SCAA Family. There are 8 normal versions including Ballman, Greenman, Whistle Sir, Yellow & Red Card Brothers, Mr. Scoreboard, Dr. First-Aid-Kid, Pong Pong Twins and Loud-Speaker, and in addition a special edition of Ballman. Each gashapon costs HK$10.

=== Ballman Autograph ===
It was the first time on 25 November 2007 that Ballman signed for SCAA fans. The autograph got Ballman's face, Chinese and English names and "SCAA" on it.

=== Mini-Calendar ===
On 14 December 2007, the first 100 SCAA Fans Club members who went to watch the match against Kitchee were each given an SCAA Family mini-calendar. More calendars were available for SCAA Fans Club to collect on 11 January 2008 before the league match against Lanwa Redbull.

=== Christmas e-Card ===
The image of the e-Card was first shown on the video of SCAA Family Blog on 21 December 2007. Some of the fans were able to receive the e-Card through email on Christmas.

=== Baby Ballman T-shirt ===
Baby Ballman T-shirt was originally the uniform for working cules in "Ballman & Greenman Show-up Party" held in Times Square on 26 November 2007. It is red in colour, with a baby Ballman cartoon, the words "I was born" and the birthday of Ballman 1 November 2007 printed on it. The T-shirt was then put up for display in BMA studio (the selling station of SCAA products). Some SCAA fans urged to buy it despite the T-shirt was originally decided not for sale. Finally, the T-shirt is available for online ordering from 18 to 23 January 2008 and the price is HKD180.

== See also ==
- South China AA
