= 2025–26 Carlisle United F.C. season =

English football club season

Carlisle United F.C.
2025–26 season
- Owner: Castle Sports Group
- Chairman: Tom Piatak
- Head Coach: Mark Hughes
- Stadium: Brunton Park
- FA Cup: Second round
- FA Trophy: Fourth round
- Top goalscorer: League: Regan Linney (19); All: Regan Linney (23)
- Highest home attendance: 13,814 vs Boreham Wood, 3 May 2026
- Lowest home attendance: 3,453 vs Boston United, 11 October 2025

The 2025–26 season is the 121st season in the history of Carlisle United Football Club and their first season back in the National League since the 2004–05 season following relegation from League Two in the previous season.

== Transfers ==
=== In ===
Date	Pos.	Player	From	Fee	Ref.
1 July 2025 (Note: The transfer was announced on 24 June, and would become official on 1 July once his Peterborough United contract expired)	RW	David Ajiboye (ENG)	Peterborough United (ENG)	Free	
1 July 2025 (Note: The transfer was announced on 17 June, and would become official on 1 July once his Shrewsbury Town contract expired)	CB	Morgan Feeney (ENG)	Shrewsbury Town (ENG)	Free	
1 July 2025 (Note: The transfer was announced on 30 May, and would become official on 1 July once his Altrincham contract expired)	CF	Regan Linney (ENG)	Altrincham (ENG)	Undisclosed	
1 July 2025 (Note: The transfer was announced on 25 June, and would become official on 1 July once his Salford City contract expired)	RW	Junior Luamba (COD)	Salford City (ENG)	Undisclosed	
1 July 2025 (Note: The transfer was announced on 26 June, and would become official on 1 July once his Manchester United contract expired)	LB	Sam Murray (ENG)	Manchester United (ENG)	Free	
11 July 2025	CDM	Josh Grant (ENG)	Wealdstone (ENG)	Free	
18 July 2025	CB	Bevis Mugabi (UGA)	Anorthosis Famagusta (CYP)	Free	
9 August 2025	CM	Harvey Macadam (ENG)	Morecambe (ENG)	Free	
7 January 2026	LB	Ryan Galvin (ENG)	Barnet (ENG)	Undisclosed	

=== Out ===
Date	Pos.	Player	To	Fee	Ref.
14 August 2025	CF	Cedwyn Scott (ENG)	South Shields (ENG)	Undisclosed	
5 January 2026	CM	Will Patching (ENG)	Coleraine (NIR)	Undisclosed	
30 January 2026	GK	Harry Lewis (ENG)	Mansfield Town (ENG)	Undisclosed	

=== Loaned in ===
Date	Pos.	Player	Loaned from	Date until	Ref.
1 September 2025	CM	Alex Gilliead (ENG)	Shrewsbury Town (ENG)	End of season (Note: The loan was extended until the end of the season on 8 January 2026)	
9 October 2025	CM	Chris Conn-Clarke (NIR)	Peterborough United (ENG)	End of season (Note: The loan was extended until the end of the season on 7 January 2026)	
30 January 2026	GK	Archie Mair (SCO)	Morecambe (ENG)	End of season	
5 February 2026	CF	Hugh Parker (IRL)	Hull City (ENG)	End of season (Note: The loan was extended until the end of the season on 9 March 2026)	
26 March 2026	CF	Ephraim Yeboah (ITA)	Bristol City (ENG)	End of season	

=== Loaned out ===
Date	Pos.	Player	Loaned to	Date until	Ref.
1 July 2025	CM	Will Patching (ENG)	Coleraine (NIR)	5 January 2026	
8 August 2025	CF	Freddie O'Donoghue (IOM)	Queen of the South (SCO)	January 2026	
10 October 2025	CM	Ethan Robson (ENG)	Spennymoor Town (ENG)	23 January 2026	
6 January 2026	CM	Josh Grant (ENG)	Altrincham (ENG)	End of season	
23 January 2026	CM	Ethan Robson (ENG)	South Shields (ENG)	End of season	
3 February 2026	CM	Seb Mason (ENG)	Queen of the South (SCO)	End of season	

=== Released / Out of Contract ===
Date	Pos.	Player	Subsequent club	Fee	Ref.
30 June 2025	CB	Ben Barclay (ENG)	Brighton & Hove Albion (ENG)	Released	
30 June 2025	CM	Taylor Charters (ENG)	Queen of the South (SCO)	Released	
30 June 2025	CF	Matthew Dennis (ENG)	Notts County (ENG)	Rejected Contract	
30 June 2025	CF	Anton Dudik (UKR)	DFK Dainava (LTU)	Released	
30 June 2025	LB	Paul Dummett (WAL)	Retired	Released	
30 June 2025	LB	Aran Fitzpatrick (ENG)	Workington (ENG)	Released	
30 June 2025	CM	Callum Guy (ENG)	Notts Olympic (ENG)	Released	
30 June 2025	CB	Samuel Lavelle (SCO)	Grimsby Town (ENG)	Released	
30 June 2025	CM	Dylan McGeouch (SCO)	Ballymena United (NIR)	Released	
30 June 2025	CM	Josh Vela (ENG)	Warrington Town (ENG)	Released	
24 July 2025	RW	Kadeem Harris (ENG)	Salford City (ENG)	Rejected Contract	
14 January 2026	GK	Jude Smith (SCO)		Mutual Consent	

== Pre-season and friendlies ==
Win Draw Loss Fixtures

8 July 2025 Friendly	Motherwell	1–0	Carlisle United	Motherwell
15:00 BST	Halliday 75'			Stadium: Fir Park; Attendance: 0 (behind closed doors)

12 July 2025 Friendly	Newcastle United	4–0	Carlisle United	Newcastle upon Tyne
15:00 BST	Longstaff 25'; Joelinton 65'; Murphy 75'; Parkinson 85'			Stadium: Darsley Park; Attendance: 0 (behind closed doors)

19 July 2025 Friendly	AFC Fylde	0–2	Carlisle United	Medlar-with-Wesham
15:00 BST			Armstrong 12'; Linney 30'	Stadium: Mill Farm Sports Village; Attendance: 1,077

22 July 2025 Friendly	South Shields	1–2	Carlisle United	Jarrow
19:45 BST	Porter		Scott 12'; Linney 61'	Stadium: 1st Cloud Arena; Attendance: 1,267

26 July 2025 Friendly	Harrogate Town	0–2	Carlisle United	Harrogate
15:00 BST		Report	Linney 25'; Armstrong 45'	Stadium: Wetherby Road; Attendance: 1,751

29 July 2025 Friendly	Curzon Ashton	3–3	Carlisle United	Ashton-under-Lyne
19:45 BST	Amado 32'; Trialist 62'; Curran 72'		Ajiboye 5'; Scott 59'; Davies 74'	Stadium: Tameside Stadium; Attendance: 396

2 August 2025 Friendly	Chester	0–2	Carlisle United	Chester
15:00 BST			Embleton 67' (pen.); Leak 72' (o.g.)	Stadium: Deva Stadium; Attendance: 1,140

== Competitions ==
=== National League ===
==== League table ====
Pos	Team	Pld	W	D	L	GF	GA	GD	Pts	Promotion, qualification or relegation
1	York City (C, P)	46	33	9	4	114	41	+73	108	Promotion to EFL League Two
2	Rochdale (O, P)	46	33	7	6	88	41	+47	106	Qualification for National League play-off semi-finals
3	Carlisle United	46	29	8	9	87	51	+36	95	Qualification for National League play-off semi-finals
4	Boreham Wood	46	27	9	10	95	58	+37	90	Qualification for the National League play-off quarter-finals
5	Scunthorpe United	46	23	13	10	77	62	+15	82	Qualification for the National League play-off quarter-finals

Source: National League official site
Rules for classification: 1) Points; 2) Goal difference; 3) Number of goals scored; 4) Number of matches won; 5) Head-to-head results
(C) Champions; (O) Play-off winners; (P) Promoted

==== Results summary ====
Overall								Home						Away					
Pld	W	D	L	GF	GA	GD	Pts	W	D	L	GF	GA	GD	W	D	L	GF	GA	GD
46	29	8	9	87	51	+36	95	15	5	3	53	24	+29	14	3	6	34	27	+7

==== Results by round ====
Round	1	2	3	4	5	6	7	8	9	10	11	12	13	14	15	16	17	18	19	20	21	22	23	24	25	26	27	28	29	30	31	32	33	34	35	36	37	38	39	40	41	42	43	44	45	46
Ground	A	H	H	A	H	A	A	H	H	A	A	H	H	A	H	A	H	A	H	A	H	H	A	A	H	H	A	H	H	A	H	A	H	A	A	H	A	A	H	A	A	H	A	H	A	H
Result	W	D	D	W	W	L	W	W	W	W	L	L	W	W	W	D	W	W	D	W	W	L	L	W	W	W	D	L	W	L	W	W	W	L	W	D	W	L	W	W	W	D	D	W	W	W
Position	3	5	6	7	3	5	3	3	3	2	3	4	3	3	2	3	1	1	3	2	2	3	5	5	4	1	3	4	3	4	3	3	3	3	3	3	3	3	3	3	3	3	3	3	3	3
Points	3	4	5	8	11	11	14	17	20	23	23	23	26	29	32	33	36	39	40	43	46	46	46	49	52	55	56	56	59	59	62	65	68	68	71	72	75	75	78	81	84	85	86	89	92	95

A = Away; H = Home; W = Win; D = Draw; L = Loss; P = Postponed

==== Matches ====
On 9 July, the National League fixtures were announced.

Win Draw Loss Fixtures

9 August 2025 1	Woking	0–2	Carlisle United	Woking
15:00 BST	Akinola (yellow card) 21'; Okoli (yellow card) 50'; Andrews (yellow card) 80'		Breeze (yellow card) 34'; Armstrong 56'; Embleton (yellow card) 74'; Robson 80'	Stadium: Kingfield Stadium; Attendance: 3,962 (1,061 away); Referee: Alan Young

16 August 2025 2	Carlisle United	3–3	Boreham Wood	Carlisle
15:00 BST	Kelly 49'; Linney 53', 71'; Wearne (yellow card) 87'		Norris 40' 79'; O'Connell 84' (yellow card) 86'	Stadium: Brunton Park; Attendance: 8,741 (45 away); Referee: James Westgate

19 August 2025 3	Carlisle United	1–1	Solihull Moors	Carlisle
19:45 BST	Murray (yellow card) 57'; Thomas (yellow card) 61' (goal) 80'		Creaney 67'	Stadium: Brunton Park; Attendance: 6,714 (69 away); Referee: Andrew Miller

23 August 2025 4	Wealdstone	0–1	Carlisle United	Ruislip
17:30 BST			Armstrong 18'; Macadam (yellow card) 77'; Luamba (yellow card) 84'; Mugabi (yellow card) 88'	Stadium: Grosvenor Vale; Attendance: 2,025 (551 away); Referee: Stephen Parkinson

25 August 2025 5	Carlisle United	5–0	Braintree Town	Carlisle
15:00 BST	Linney 15', 54' (pen.), 65'; Langston 29' (o.g.); Ellis 80'		Francis-Clarke (yellow card) 55'; Thorpe (yellow card) 57'	Stadium: Brunton Park; Attendance: 6,761 (58 away); Referee: Scott Jackson

30 August 2025 6	Sutton United	2–1	Carlisle United	Sutton
15:00 BST	Pruti 49'; Ogbonna 82'		Wearne (yellow card) 24'; Kelly 90+4'	Stadium: Gander Green Lane; Attendance: 2,507 (599 away); Referee: Darren Drysdale

3 September 2025 7	Brackley Town	0–1	Carlisle United	Brackley
19:45 BST	Lilley (yellow card) 62'; Maxted (yellow card) 66'; Roberts (yellow card) 78'		Kelly (yellow card) 27'; Breeze (yellow card) 79'; Linney 79'	Stadium: St James Park; Attendance: 1,454 (425 away); Referee: Abigail Byrne

6 September 2025 8	Carlisle United	3–0	Truro City	Carlisle
15:00 BST	Armstrong 10', 12'; Ellis (yellow card) 22'; Linney 60' (yellow card) 83'; Davies (yellow card) 66'		Kite (yellow card) 48'	Stadium: Brunton Park; Attendance: 7,539 (78 away); Referee: Dean Watson

13 September 2025 9	Carlisle United	2–0	Aldershot Town	Carlisle
15:00 BST	Linney (yellow card) 23' (goal) 46'; Mugabi 69'		Clarridge (yellow card) 23'	Stadium: Brunton Park; Attendance: 7,039 (158 away); Referee: Paul Cooper

20 September 2025 10	Altrincham	1–2	Carlisle United	Altrincham
15:00 BST	Knowles 19' (pen.); Osborne (yellow card) 24'; Crawford (yellow card) 45+3' (yellow-red card) 90+4'		Banks 9' (o.g.); Harper (yellow card) 16' (yellow-red card) 54'; Kelly (yellow card) 17'; Gilliead (yellow card) 19'; Thomas (yellow card) 20'; Linney 35'; Ellis (yellow card) 86'	Stadium: Moss Lane; Attendance: 3,332 (1,056 away); Referee: Richie Watkins

23 September 2025 11	York City	5–0	Carlisle United	Huntington
19:45 BST	Fagan-Walcott 4'; Pearce 39' (pen.) 44'; Newby 49'; Grey (yellow card) 51'; Hunt (yellow card) 65'; Brookes (yellow card) 70'; Stones 86' (yellow card) 90+3'		Thomas (yellow card) 29'; Breeze (yellow card) 39'; Gilliead (yellow card) 60'; Whelan (yellow card) 90+1'; Feeney (yellow card) 90+2'	Stadium: York Community Stadium; Attendance: 7,272 (1,527 away); Referee: Zac Kennard-Kettle

27 September 2025 12	Carlisle United	0–2	Rochdale	Carlisle
15:00 BST	Mugabi (yellow card) 58'; Linney (yellow card) 69'		Dieseruvwe 6' 56'; Adebayo-Rowling (yellow card) 61'; Moss (yellow card) 81'	Stadium: Brunton Park; Attendance: 8,014 (720 away); Referee: Ollie Yates

1 October 2025 13	Carlisle United	3–1	Hartlepool United	Carlisle
19:45 BST	Harper 4'; Kelly 77'; Feeney 89'		Francis 46'	Stadium: Brunton Park; Attendance: 6,170 (478 away); Referee: Simon Mather

4 October 2025 14	Scunthorpe United	0–1	Carlisle United	Scunthorpe
17:30 BST	Boyce (red card) 40'; Evans (yellow card) 45+5'; Westbrooke (yellow card) 53'; Beestin (yellow card) 84'; Denton (yellow card) 85'		Hayden 20'; Wearne (yellow card) 23'; Linney (yellow card) 25'; Gilliead (yellow card) 27'; Harper (yellow card) 37'	Stadium: Glanford Park; Attendance: 5,472 (691 away); Referee: Greg Rollason

18 October 2025 15	Carlisle United	4–2	Forest Green Rovers	Carlisle
17:30 BST	Kelly (yellow card) 4' (goal) 90+2' (pen.); Conn-Clarke (yellow card) 14'; Gilliead (yellow card) 17'; Linney 18', 45'; Hayden (yellow card) 78'; Macadam 85'		Clarke 26'; Babalola (yellow card) 38'; Moore (yellow card) 45+2'; Mendy (yellow card) 48' (yellow-red card) 63'; Bunker 53'; Whitwell (yellow card) 65'	Stadium: Brunton Park; Attendance: 8,598 (124 away); Referee: James Oldham

25 October 2025 16	Yeovil Town	1–1	Carlisle United	Yeovil
15:00 BST	Feeney 15' (o.g.); Greenslade (yellow card) 62'; Cousin-Dawson (yellow card) 90+3'		Hayden (yellow card) 44'; Macadam 68'	Stadium: Huish Park; Attendance: 2,933 (459 away); Referee: William Davis

4 November 2025 17	Carlisle United	2–0	FC Halifax Town	Carlisle
19:45 GMT	Luamba 15', 68'		Cooke (yellow card) 41'	Stadium: Brunton Park; Attendance: 5,897 (109 away); Referee: Gareth Thomas

8 November 2025 18	Southend United	1–2	Carlisle United	Southend-on-Sea
17:30 GMT	Austin 31'; Dallas (yellow card) 33'		Conn-Clarke 19'; Linney 28'; Williams (yellow card) 36'; Davies (yellow card) 45+7'; Ellis (yellow card) 90+4'	Stadium: Roots Hall; Attendance: 8,847 (584 away); Referee: Michael Barlow

15 November 2025 19	Carlisle United	1–1	Eastleigh	Carlisle
15:03 GMT	Luamba 50' (yellow card) 69'		Eweka (yellow card) 43'; Brindley (yellow card) 44'; Evans 89'	Stadium: Brunton Park; Attendance: 10,860 (85 away); Referee: Martin Coy

22 November 2025 20	Boston United	1–2	Carlisle United	Boston
17:30 GMT	John-Lewis 56'; Maguire (yellow card) 67'; Carson (yellow card) 73'; Lavinier (yellow card) 90+6'		Hayden (yellow card) 11'; Macadam 54', 90' (yellow card) 60'	Stadium: Boston Community Stadium; Attendance: 2,090 (491 away); Referee: Sam Mulhall

29 November 2025 21	Carlisle United	2–1	Tamworth	Carlisle
15:00 GMT	Feeney (yellow card) 7'; Kelly 25', 79'; Ajiboye (yellow card) 85'		Roberts (yellow card) 21'; Digie (yellow card) 31'; Ponticelli 39'; Donkor (yellow card) 90+5'	Stadium: Brunton Park; Attendance: 6,763 (93 away); Referee: Niall Smith

10 December 2025 22	Carlisle United	1–3	Woking	Carlisle
19:45 GMT	Luamba 25'		Andrews 43'; Akinola 45+2'; O'Brien 90'	Stadium: Brunton Park; Attendance: 5,264 (34 away); Referee: Aaron Jackson

21 December 2025 23	Boreham Wood	2–0	Carlisle United	Borehamwood
16:00 GMT	Brunt 31'; Abdulmalik 37'; King (yellow card) 54'		Hayden (yellow card) 27'; Kelly (yellow card) 48'; Jones (yellow card) 89'	Stadium: Meadow Park; Attendance: 1,866 (641 away); Referee: Isaac Searle

26 December 2025 24	Gateshead	0–3	Carlisle United	Gateshead
15:00 GMT	Adom (yellow card) 90+1'		Embleton 36'; Linney 71' (pen.); Armstrong 88'	Stadium: Gateshead International Stadium; Attendance: 4,492 (3,500 away); Referee: Richard Aspinall

30 December 2025 25	Carlisle United	1–0	Morecambe	Carlisle
19:45 GMT	Linney (yellow card) 35'; Armstrong 45+2'		Kacurri (yellow card) 35'; Francillette (yellow card) 84'; Tollitt (yellow card) 85'	Stadium: Brunton Park; Attendance: 8,356 (639 away); Referee: Aaron Banister

3 January 2026 26	Carlisle United	2–0	Wealdstone	Carlisle
15:00 GMT	Armstrong 25'; Williams (yellow card) 37'; Hayden 60'; Linney (yellow card) 87'			Stadium: Brunton Park; Attendance: 6,853 (108 away); Referee: Garreth Rhodes

17 January 2026 27	Solihull Moors	3–3	Carlisle United	Solihull
15:00 GMT	Lipsiuc 26', 37'; Green (yellow card) 69'; Stevenson (yellow card) 85'; High 90+3'		Kelly 3', 66', 71'; Hayden (yellow card) 14'; Embleton (yellow card) 49'; Feeney (yellow card) 54'	Stadium: Damson Park; Attendance: 1,956 (720 away); Referee: Steven Copeland

21 January 2026 28	Carlisle United	0–3	York City	Carlisle
19:45 GMT			Stones 6'; Hunt 75' (pen.); Newby 90+8'	Stadium: Brunton Park; Attendance: 7,238 (880 away); Referee: Scott Jackson

24 January 2026 29	Aldershot Town	P–P	Carlisle United	Aldershot
15:00 GMT				Stadium: Recreation Ground
Note: Fixture was postponed due to an unplayable surface, game re-arranged for 10 March 2026

31 January 2026 29	Carlisle United	3–1	Altrincham	Carlisle
15:00 GMT	Ajiboye 26'; Armstrong 31'; Sassi 34' (o.g.); Williams (yellow card) 49'; Linney (yellow card) 82'		Kosylo (yellow card) 25'; Golden (yellow card) 54'; Knowles 69'; Cooper (yellow card) 90+4'	Stadium: Brunton Park; Attendance: 7,010 (284 away); Referee: Scott Oldham

7 February 2026 30	Rochdale	1–0	Carlisle United	Rochdale
15:00 GMT	Moss 41'; Barlow (yellow card) 80'		Galvin (yellow card) 41'; Embleton (yellow card) 83'	Stadium: Spotland Stadium; Attendance: 4,725 (1,325 away); Referee: Charles Breakspear

10 February 2026 31	Carlisle United	3–2	Scunthorpe United	Carlisle
19:45 GMT	Embleton 22' (yellow card) 26'; Ajiboye 57', 84'; Wearne (yellow card) 67'; Williams (yellow card) 74'		Roberts 40'; Rowley (yellow card) 57'; Beestin 90+4' (yellow card) 90+8'	Stadium: Brunton Park; Attendance: 5,226 (259 away); Referee: Thomas Parsons

14 February 2026 32	Forest Green Rovers	1–3	Carlisle United	Nailsworth
17:30 GMT	Haughton (yellow card) 6'; Mingi 52'; Kircough (yellow card) 89'		Wearne 11'; Feeney 22' (yellow card) 66'; Ajiboye 29'; Williams (yellow card) 39'; Ellis (yellow card) 90+1'	Stadium: The New Lawn; Attendance: 2,353 (431 away); Referee: Carl Brook

21 February 2026 33	Carlisle United	3–0	Yeovil Town	Carlisle
15:00 GMT	Feeney 5'; Macadam (yellow card) 11'; Armstrong 17' (pen.); Galvin 45+3'			Stadium: Brunton Park; Attendance: 6,665 (145 away); Referee: Michael Barlow

25 February 2026 34	Hartlepool United	3–1	Carlisle United	Hartlepool
19:45 GMT	Sinclair 12' (yellow card) 71'; Reid 46'; Okike 77'		Macadam (yellow card) 14' (yellow-red card) 59'; Ellis (yellow card) 68'; Kelly 80'	Stadium: Victoria Park; Attendance: 4,812 (774 away); Referee: Declan Bourne

28 February 2026 35	Eastleigh	1–2	Carlisle United	Eastleigh
15:00 GMT	Blair (yellow card) 74'; Eweka 90+4'		Kelly 54'; Wearne 69' (yellow card) 83'	Stadium: Ten Acres; Attendance: 2,626 (444 away); Referee: Alan Dale

7 March 2026 36	Carlisle United	2–2	Southend United	Carlisle
17:30 GMT	Kelly 3'; Linney 36'		Gubbins (yellow card) 29'; Dallas 65'; Golding (yellow card) 69'; Thomas 81' (o.g.)	Stadium: Brunton Park; Attendance: 10,520 (626 away); Referee: Paul Marsden

10 March 2026 37	Aldershot Town	0–2	Carlisle United	Aldershot
19:45 GMT	Scott (yellow card) 43'; Nightingale (yellow card) 90+5'		Feeney 36'; Macadam 43'; Linney (yellow card) 46'; Armstrong (yellow card) 51'; Atkinson (yellow card) 59'; Breeze (yellow card) 78'	Stadium: Recreation Ground; Attendance: 1,760 (236 away); Referee: James Durkin

14 March 2026 38	Tamworth	2–1	Carlisle United	Tamworth
15:00 GMT	Lynch 65' 77'; Acquaye (yellow card) 76'		Wearne 53'	Stadium: The Lamb Ground; Attendance: 1,716 (727 away); Referee: Gareth Thomas

21 March 2026 39	Carlisle United	6–2	Boston United	Carlisle
15:00 GMT	Armstrong 25'; Galvin (yellow card) 45+3'; Linney 63' (pen.); Lankshear 73' (o.g.); Ajiboye 83' 90'; Mugabi 90+8'		Cameron (yellow card) 4'; Richards (yellow card) 24'; Hiwula 38'; Maguire 41' (red card) 62'; Rooney (yellow card) 47'; Sloggett (yellow card) 75'	Stadium: Brunton Park; Attendance: 6,450 (196 away); Referee: Callum Jones

24 March 2026 40	FC Halifax Town	0–1	Carlisle United	Halifax
19:45 GMT	Turner-Cooke (yellow card) 74'; Smith (yellow card) 84'		Galvin (yellow card) 66'; Linney 69' (yellow card) 82'; Ajiboye (yellow card) 74'	Stadium: The Shay; Attendance: 1,635 (477 away); Referee: Abigail Byrne

28 March 2026 41	Braintree Town	1–2	Carlisle United	Braintree
15:00 GMT	Walker 42'; Okunowo (yellow card) 58'; Drake (yellow card) 82'		Linney 35'; Harper 90'	Stadium: Cressing Road; Attendance: 1,284 (454 away); Referee: Melissa Burgin

3 April 2026 42	Carlisle United	0–0	Gateshead	Carlisle
15:00 BST	Gilliead (yellow card) 72'; Davies (yellow card) 89'		Ferguson (yellow card) 52'; Ward (yellow card) 88'	Stadium: Brunton Park; Attendance: 8,558 (735 away); Referee: Garreth Rhodes

6 April 2026 43	Morecambe	2–2	Carlisle United	Morecambe
15:00 BST	G. Edwards 32'; Songo'o (yellow card) 45+2'; Macadam 82' (o.g.); Azeez (yellow card) 85'		Galvin (yellow card) 45+2'; Linney 48'; Ajiboye 68'; Feeney (yellow card) 85'	Stadium: Mazuma Mobile Stadium; Attendance: 4,566 (1,725 away); Referee: Zac Kennard-Kettle

11 April 2026 44	Carlisle United	3–0	Sutton United	Carlisle
15:00 BST	Macadam 10' 23'; Galvin 41'; Whelan (yellow card) 60'; Ajiboye (yellow card) 63'		Simper (yellow card) 8'; Taylor (yellow card) 28'; Ruiz (yellow card) 44'; Harris (yellow card) 74'	Stadium: Brunton Park; Attendance: 6,296 (91 away); Referee: Declan Brown

18 April 2026 45	Truro City	0–1	Carlisle United	Threemilestone
15:00 BST			Linney 65'	Stadium: Truro City Stadium; Attendance: 2,928 (880 away); Referee: Aaron Jackson

25 April 2026 46	Carlisle United	3–0	Brackley Town	Carlisle
12:30 GMT	Armstrong 6'; Ellis 31'; Kelly 90+1'		Elliott-Wheeler (yellow card) 44'; Pollock (yellow card) 52'	Stadium: Brunton Park; Attendance: 7,334 (52 away); Referee: Steven Copeland

==== Play-offs ====
3 May 2026 SF	Carlisle United	1–2 (a.e.t.)	Boreham Wood	Carlisle
12:30 BST	Galvin (yellow card) 37'; Feeney 40' (yellow card) 120+3'; Hayden (yellow card) 90+4'; Luamba (red card) 96'		Abdulmalik 26'; Ayinde (yellow card) 64'; Booty (yellow card) 68'; White (yellow card) 90+1'; Bush (yellow card) 90+4'; Brunt 106'; O'Connell (yellow card) 120+2'	Stadium: Brunton Park; Attendance: 13,814 (307 away); Referee: Martin Woods

=== FA Cup ===
11 October 2025 Q4	Carlisle United	5–2	Boston United	Carlisle
15:00 BST	Ajiboye 5'; Grant 15'; Armstrong 16'; Conn-Clarke 60', 78'		Maguire (yellow card) 41'; Donnelly 46'; John-Lewis 49'; Sloggett (yellow card) 54'; Lankshear (yellow card) 82'	Stadium: Brunton Park; Attendance: 3,453 (164 away); Referee: Dale Baines

1 November 2025 R1	Reading	2–3 (a.e.t.)	Carlisle United	Reading
15:00 GMT	Wing 32'; Yiadom (yellow card) 50'; Garcia (yellow card) 83'; O'Mahony 86'; Savage (yellow card) 91'; Abrefa (yellow card) 104'	Report	Linney 90+3', 90+8', 94' (yellow card) 114'; Hayden (yellow card) 112'	Stadium: Madejski Stadium; Attendance: 3,929 (529 away); Referee: Ruebyn Ricardo

7 December 2025 R2	Blackpool	4–1	Carlisle United	Blackpool
17:30 GMT	Bloxham 14'; Ashworth (yellow card) 30'; Fletcher 34', 56'; Banks 38'; Coulson (yellow card) 90+1'	Report	Armstrong 51'; Gilliead (yellow card) 60'	Stadium: Bloomfield Road; Attendance: 5,958 (3,500 away); Referee: Tom Reeves

=== FA Trophy ===
13 December 2025 R3	Harborough Town	1–2	Carlisle United	Market Harborough
15:00 GMT	Dolman 69'	Report	Murray 28'; Linney 57'; Wearne (yellow card) 81'	Stadium: Bowden Park; Attendance: 1,726; Referee: Greg Rollason

10 January 2026 R4	Chatham Town	1–0	Carlisle United	Chatham
15:00 GMT	MacArthur 25'	Report		Stadium: The Bauvill Stadium; Attendance: 1,703; Referee: Harrison Blair

== Statistics ==
=== Appearances and goals ===
As of match played 3 May 2026

Players with no appearances are not included on the list

No.	Pos	Nat	Player	Total		National League		National League Play-Offs		FA Cup		FA Trophy	
No.	Pos	Nat	Player	Apps	Goals	Apps	Goals	Apps	Goals	Apps	Goals	Apps	Goals
1	GK	(England) ENG	Gabriel Breeze	46	0	45	0	1	0	0	0	0	0
2	DF	(England) ENG	Archie Davies	27	0	14+10	0	0	0	0+1	0	2	0
3	DF	(Scotland) SCO	Cameron Harper	37	2	26+7	2	0	0	2	0	0+2	0
4	DF	(Saint Lucia) LCA	Terell Thomas	28	1	22+6	1	0	0	0	0	0	0
5	DF	(England) ENG	Morgan Feeney	42	5	33+5	4	1	1	2	0	0+1	0
6	DF	(England) ENG	Aaron Hayden	23	2	18+1	2	1	0	3	0	0	0
7	FW	(England) ENG	David Ajiboye	34	8	18+11	7	1	0	3	1	1	0
8	MF	(England) ENG	Callum Whelan	27	0	9+12	0	1	0	1+2	0	2	0
9	FW	(Republic of Ireland) IRL	Georgie Kelly	40	13	21+15	13	0+1	0	0+2	0	1	0
10	FW	(England) ENG	Regan Linney	46	23	40+2	19	1	0	1+1	3	1	1
11	FW	(Democratic Republic of the Congo) COD	Junior Luamba	22	4	12+7	4	0+1	0	1+1	0	0	0
12	DF	(England) ENG	Ryan Galvin	19	2	17+1	2	1	0	0	0	0	0
13	GK	(Scotland) SCO	Archie Mair	1	0	1	0	0	0	0	0	0	0
14	MF	(England) ENG	Elliot Embleton	15	2	10+3	2	0	0	0	0	1+1	0
15	DF	(England) ENG	Sam Murray	6	1	2+1	0	0	0	1	0	2	1
16	FW	(England) ENG	Stephen Wearne	41	3	27+10	3	1	0	0+2	0	1	0
18	DF	(England) ENG	Jack Ellis	48	2	28+15	2	0+1	0	2	0	2	0
19	MF	(England) ENG	Sam Hetherington	3	0	0	0	0	0	0+1	0	2	0
20	MF	(England) ENG	Alex Gilliead	41	0	37	0	0	0	2+1	0	1	0
21	FW	(Northern Ireland) NIR	Jordan Jones	10	0	2+6	0	0	0	0+2	0	0	0
22	DF	(England) ENG	Josh Williams	29	0	20+3	0	1	0	3	0	0+2	0
23	FW	(England) ENG	Charlie Wyke	8	0	0+8	0	0	0	0	0	0	0
25	FW	(Italy) ITA	Ephraim Yeboah	7	0	1+5	0	0+1	0	0	0	0	0
26	DF	(Uganda) UGA	Bevis Mugabi	28	2	20+6	2	0+1	0	0	0	1	0
29	FW	(England) ENG	Luke Armstrong	43	13	24+14	11	1	0	3	2	1	0
30	FW	(Republic of Ireland) IRL	Hugh Parker	13	0	2+11	0	0	0	0	0	0	0
31	DF	(England) ENG	Hayden Atkinson	9	0	5+1	0	0	0	0+1	0	2	0
37	MF	(England) ENG	Harvey Macadam	44	7	36+5	7	1	0	2	0	0	0
38	FW	(Northern Ireland) NIR	Chris Conn-Clarke	22	3	13+4	1	0+1	0	3	2	0+1	0
39	MF	(England) ENG	Amaru Smith	1	0	0	0	0	0	0	0	0+1	0
Player(s) who featured but departed the club permanently during the season:
25	GK	(England) ENG	Harry Lewis	5	0	0	0	0	0	3	0	2	0
Player(s) who featured but departed the club on loan during the season:
17	MF	(England) ENG	Ethan Robson	3	1	0+3	1	0	0	0	0	0	0
24	MF	(England) ENG	Josh Grant	13	1	3+8	0	0	0	1+1	1	0	0
36	MF	(England) ENG	Seb Mason	1	0	0	0	0	0	0	0	0+1	0
