= 2024–25 Carlisle United F.C. season =

120th season in existence of Carlisle United FC

Carlisle United
2024–25 season
- Owner: Castle Sports Group
- Chairman: Tom Piatak
- Head Coach: Paul Simpson (until 31 August); Mark Birch (interim); Mike Williamson (from 19 September-3 February); Mark Hughes (from 6 February)
- Stadium: Brunton Park
- League Two: 23rd (relegated)
- FA Cup: First round (eliminated by Wigan Athletic)
- EFL Cup: First round (eliminated by Stoke City)
- EFL Trophy: Group stage
- Top goalscorer: League: Matthew Dennis (6); All: Matthew Dennis (6)
- Highest home attendance: 12,305 vs Port Vale, 18 April 2025
- Lowest home attendance: 1,102 vs Nottingham Forest U21, 3 September 2024

The 2024–25 season is the 120th season in the history of Carlisle United Football Club and their first season back in League Two since the 2022–23 season following relegation from League One in the previous season. In addition to the domestic league, the club are also participating in the FA Cup, the EFL Cup, and the 2024–25 EFL Trophy.

== Transfers ==
=== In ===
Date	Pos.	Player	From	Fee	Ref.
1 July 2024 (Note: The transfer was announced on 14 June, and would become official on July 1 once his Inverness Caledonian Thistle contract expired)	LB	Cameron Harper (SCO)	Inverness Caledonian Thistle (SCO)	Free	
1 July 2024 (Note: The transfer was announced on 20 May, and would become official on July 1 once his Wrexham contract expired)	CB	Aaron Hayden (ENG)	Wrexham (WAL)	Free	
1 July 2024 (Note: The transfer was announced on 26 June, and would become official on July 1 once his Milton Keynes Dons contract expired)	CM	Ethan Robson (ENG)	Milton Keynes Dons (ENG)	Free	
1 July 2024 (Note: The transfer was announced on 11 June, and would become official on July 1 once his Newcastle United contract expired)	GK	Jude Smith (SCO)	Newcastle United (ENG)	Free	
1 July 2024 (Note: The transfer was announced on 17 June, and would become official on July 1 once his Charlton Athletic contract expired)	CB	Terell Thomas (LCA)	Charlton Athletic (ENG)	Free	
1 July 2024	CF	Charlie Wyke (ENG)	Wigan Athletic (ENG)	Free	
9 July 2024	RB	Archie Davies (ENG)	Dundalk (IRL)	Undisclosed	
10 August 2024	LB	Ben Williams (WAL)	Cheltenham Town (ENG)	Free	
27 August 2024	LW	Jordan Jones (NIR)	Wigan Athletic (ENG)	Free	
19 October 2024	RW	Tyler Burey (ENG)	Odense (DEN)	Free	
9 November 2024	CM	Kadeem Harris (ENG)	Şanlıurfaspor (TUR)	Free	
1 January 2025 (Note: The transfer was announced on 27 December, and would become official on January 1 once the transfer window opened)	CM	Will Patching (ENG)	Derry City (NIR)	Free	
2 January 2025	AM	Elliot Embleton (ENG)	Blackpool (ENG)	Undisclosed	
3 January 2025	DM	Callum Whelan (ENG)	Gateshead (ENG)	Undisclosed	
6 January 2025	CF	Cedwyn Scott (ENG)	Notts County (ENG)	Undisclosed	
10 January 2025	LB	Paul Dummett (WAL)	Wigan Athletic (ENG)	Free	
13 January 2025	AM	Stephen Wearne (ENG)	Milton Keynes Dons (ENG)	Undisclosed	
21 January 2025	RB	Josh Williams (ENG)	Birmingham City (ENG)	Undisclosed	
11 February 2025	CF	Matthew Dennis (ENG)	Milton Keynes Dons (ENG)	Free	

=== Out ===
Date	Pos.	Player	To	Fee	Ref.
8 July 2024	LB	Jack Armer (SCO)	Burton Albion (ENG)	Undisclosed	
12 July 2024	CM	Alfie McCalmont (NIR)	Central Coast Mariners (AUS)	Undisclosed	
30 August 2024	CF	Danny Butterworth (ENG)	Swindon Town (ENG)	Undisclosed	
11 January 2025	CB	Jon Mellish (ENG)	Wigan Athletic (ENG)	Undisclosed	
16 January 2025	CM	Harrison Neal (ENG)	Fleetwood Town (ENG)	Undisclosed	

=== Loaned in ===
Date	Pos.	Player	Loaned from	Date until	Ref.
1 August 2024	CF	Daniel Adu-Adjei (ENG)	Bournemouth (ENG)	10 January 2025 (Note: On 10 January, Adu-Adjei was recalled back to his parent club Bournemouth)	
21 August 2024	LW	Dominic Sadi (ENG)	Bournemouth (ENG)	10 January 2025 (Note: On 10 January, Sadi was recalled back to his parent club Bournemouth)	
30 August 2024	CM	Harrison Biggins (ENG)	Shrewsbury Town (ENG)	14 January 2025 (Note: On 14 January, Biggins was recalled back to his parent club Shrewsbury)	
7 January 2025	CM	Sean Fusire (ENG)	Sheffield Wednesday (ENG)	End of Season	
16 January 2025	CB	Charlie McArthur (SCO)	Newcastle United (ENG)	End of Season	
17 January 2025	CF	Joe Hugill (ENG)	Manchester United (ENG)	End of Season	
31 January 2025	CF	Joe Bevan (SCO)	Burnley (ENG)	End of Season	

=== Loaned out ===
Date	Pos.	Player	Loaned to	Date until	Ref.
10 September 2024	CM	Jake Allan (ENG)	Workington (ENG)	31 December 2024	
10 September 2024	CB	Aran Fitzpatrick (ENG)	Workington (ENG)	31 December 2024	
18 October 2024	AM	Sam Hetherington (ENG)	Workington (ENG)	31 December 2024	
24 October 2024	CF	Anton Dudik (UKR)	South Shields (ENG)	23 December 2024	
24 January 2025	CF	Luke Armstrong (ENG)	Motherwell (SCO)	End of Season	
27 January 2025	CM	Taylor Charters (ENG)	Queen of the South (SCO)	End of Season	
27 March 2025	CM	Ethan Robson (ENG)	Gateshead (ENG)	End of Season	

=== Released / Out of Contract ===
Date	Pos.	Player	Subsequent club	Joined date	Ref.
3 June 2024	CM	Jayden Harris (ENG)	Sutton United (ENG)	1 July 2024	
30 June 2024	RM	Jordan Gibson (ENG)	Doncaster Rovers (ENG)	1 July 2024	
30 June 2024	CM	Kai Nugent (ENG)	Workington (ENG)	1 July 2024	
30 June 2024	RB	Corey Whelan (IRL)	AFC Fylde (ENG)	1 July 2024	
30 June 2024	LB	Max Kilsby (ENG)	Annan Athletic (SCO)	11 July 2024	
30 June 2024	CF	Sean Maguire (IRL)	Cork City (IRL)	6 August 2024	
30 June 2024	RB	Josh Emmanuel (ENG)	Doncaster Rovers (ENG)	6 September 2024	
30 June 2024	CB	Paul Huntington (ENG)	Bradford City (ENG)	1 October 2024	
30 June 2024	GK	Tomáš Holý (CZE)	Baník Most-Souš (CZE)	4 October 2024	
5 January 2025	LB	Ben Williams (WAL)	Morecambe (ENG)	21 August 2025	
18 January 2025	RW	Tyler Burey (ENG)	FK Igman Konjic (BIH)	6 February 2025	
3 February 2025	LB	Jack Robinson (ENG)	Hartlepool United (ENG)	5 February 2025	

== Pre-season and friendlies ==
On 16 May, Carlisle announced their first four pre-season friendlies, against Penrith, Kendal Town, Workington and Stockport County.

Win Draw Loss Fixtures

5 July 2024 Friendly	Penrith	0–8	Carlisle United	Penrith
19:00 BST		Report	Harper 1'; Butterworth 5', 39'; Charters 51' (pen.), 75'; Armstrong 54'; Hetheringon 90+2'; O'Donoghue 90+3'	Stadium: Frenchfields Stadium; Attendance: 1,030; Referee: Scott Henry

9 July 2024 Friendly	Kendal Town	0–3	Carlisle United	Kendal
19:00 BST		Report	Thomas 14'; Wyke 68', 75'	Stadium: Parkside Road; Attendance: 651; Referee: Mike Crusham

13 July 2024 Friendly	Workington	0–0	Carlisle United	Workington
15:00 BST		Report		Stadium: Borough Park; Attendance: 1,214; Referee: Anthony Backhouse

19 July 2024 Friendly	St Mirren	2–2	Carlisle United	Paisley, Scotland
19:00 BST	Olusanya 50'; Scott 80'	Report	Neal 30'; Thomas 85'	Stadium: St Mirren Park

27 July 2024 Friendly	Rochdale	2–1	Carlisle United	Spotland
15:00 BST	Mitchell 41'; Henry 48'	Report	Butterworth 72'	Stadium: Spotland Stadium; Attendance: 975; Referee: Ben Wyatt

30 July 2024 Friendly	Gateshead	2–0	Carlisle United	Gateshead
19:00 BST	Oseni 47', 56'	Report		Stadium: Gateshead International Stadium; Attendance: 668; Referee: Seb Stockbridge

3 August 2024 Friendly	Carlisle United	2–1	Stockport County	Carlisle
15:00 BST	Adu-Adjei 26'; Armstrong 68'	Report	Wootton 50'	Stadium: Brunton Park; Attendance: 1,880; Referee: Simon Mather

== Competitions ==
=== League Two ===
==== League table ====
Pos	Team	Pld	W	D	L	GF	GA	GD	Pts	Promotion, qualification or relegation
20	Tranmere Rovers	46	12	15	19	45	65	−20	51	
21	Accrington Stanley	46	12	14	20	53	69	−16	50	
22	Newport County	46	13	10	23	52	76	−24	49	
23	Carlisle United (R)	46	10	12	24	44	71	−27	42	Relegation to National League
24	Morecambe (R)	46	10	6	30	40	72	−32	36	Relegation to National League

Source: EFL Official Website
Rules for classification: 1) Points; 2) Goal difference; 3) Number of goals scored; 4) Head-to-head results; 5) Wins; 6) Away goals; 7) Penalty points (sec 9.5); 8) 12-point sending off offences
(R) Relegated

==== Results summary ====
Overall								Home						Away					
Pld	W	D	L	GF	GA	GD	Pts	W	D	L	GF	GA	GD	W	D	L	GF	GA	GD
46	10	12	24	44	71	−27	42	5	8	10	25	35	−10	5	4	14	19	36	−17

Last updated: 3 May 2025.
Source: Soccerway

==== Results by round ====
Round	1	2	3	4	5	6	7	8	9	10	11	12	13	14	15	16	17	18	20	21	22	23	24	25	27	28	29	30	31	19^{1}	32	33	34	35	36	37	38	26^{2}	39	40	41	42	43	44	45	46
Ground	A	H	A	H	A	H	A	H	H	A	A	H	A	H	A	A	H	H	H	A	H	H	A	A	H	A	A	H	A	A	H	H	A	H	A	H	H	H	A	A	H	A	H	A	A	H
Result	L	W	L	L	L	L	W	L	L	D	L	D	L	L	W	D	D	D	L	D	L	W	L	L	L	W	L	L	L	L	D	D	W	D	L	L	W	D	L	L	W	W	W	D	L	D
Position	24	15	19	21	22	22	22	22	22	22	24	23	23	23	23	23	24	22	24	23	24	23	24	24	24	23	23	24	24	24	24	24	24	24	24	24	24	23	24	24	24	23	23	23	23	23
Points	0	3	3	3	3	3	6	6	6	7	7	8	8	8	11	12	13	14	14	15	15	18	18	18	18	21	21	21	21	21	22	23	26	27	27	27	30	31	31	31	34	37	40	41	41	42

Source: EFL
A = Away; H = Home; W = Win; D = Draw; L = Loss; P = Postponed
Notes:
- ^{1} Matchday 19 (vs. Newport County) was postponed due to spectator and player safety concerns from Storm Darragh.
- ^{2} Matchday 26 (vs. Milton Keynes Dons) was postponed due to a frozen pitch.

==== Matches ====
On 26 June, the League Two fixtures were announced.

Win Draw Loss Fixtures

10 August 2024 1	Gillingham	4–1	Carlisle United	Gillingham
15:00 BST	Dieng 2'; Rowe (yellow card) 26'; Wakeling 48', (yellow card) 54'; Turner (yellow card) 71'; Nolan 77'; Williams 87'	Report	Mellish 65'	Stadium: Priestfield Stadium; Attendance: 7,037 (533 away); Referee: Ben Atkinson

17 August 2024 2	Carlisle United	1–0	Barrow	Carlisle
12:30 BST	Wyke (yellow card) 24'; Adu-Adjei 35'; Hayden (yellow card) 43'; Barclay (yellow card) 62'; Davies (yellow card) 82'; Vela (yellow card) 90+5'	Report	Vassell (yellow card) 37'; Gotts (yellow card) 45+2'	Stadium: Brunton Park; Attendance: 9,813 (885 away); Referee: Matthew Corlett
Note: Fixture was initially scheduled for a 15:00 kick-off, but was moved for live Sky Sports broadcast.

24 August 2024 3	Milton Keynes Dons	3–0	Carlisle United	Milton Keynes
15:00 BST	Hendry 18'; Gilbey 31'; Wearne (yellow card) 38'; Nemane (yellow card) 75'; Tomlinson 90+2'; Tripp (yellow card) 90+8'	Report		Stadium: Stadium MK; Attendance: 6,399 (734 away); Referee: Farai Hallam

31 August 2024 4	Carlisle United	1–2	Tranmere Rovers	Carlisle
15:00 BST	Davies 7'; Jones (yellow card) 45+1'; Ellis (yellow card) 85'		Patrick 6', 37'	Stadium: Brunton Park; Attendance: 8,003 (723 away); Referee: Simon Mather

7 September 2024 5	Bradford City	2–1	Carlisle United	Bradford
15:00 BST	Cook 2', 70'; Byrne (yellow card) 29'; Kelly (yellow card) 78'; Diabate (yellow card) 90+3'	Report	Neal (yellow card) 20', (goal) 58'; Davies (yellow card) 67'; McGeouch (yellow card) 81'	Stadium: Valley Parade; Attendance: 18,041 (1,756 away); Referee: Paul Howard

14 September 2024 6	Carlisle United	2–3	Fleetwood Town	Carlisle
15:00 BST	Hayden (yellow card) 20'; Wyke 42' (pen.), 52'; Biggins (yellow card) 78'; Davies (yellow card) 79'; Jones (yellow card) 83'		Mayor 10', 68'; Coughlan 19' (yellow card) 77'; Helm (yellow card) 21'; Virtue (yellow card) 58'; Johnston (yellow card) 87'	Stadium: Brunton Park; Attendance: 7,090 (332 away); Referee: Scott Tallis

21 September 2024 7	Swindon Town	0–2	Carlisle United	Swindon
15:00 BST			Lavelle 42'; Jones (yellow card) 47'; Harper (yellow card) 49'; Armstrong 72'; Wyke (yellow card) 79'	Stadium: County Ground; Attendance: 6,878 (483 away); Referee: Carl Brook

28 September 2024 8	Carlisle United	2–3	Grimsby Town	Carlisle
15:00 BST	Lavelle 12'; Sadi 27' (yellow card) 58'; Vela (yellow card) 55'; Barclay (yellow card) 61'		Barrington 24'; Cass 81'; Rodgers 90'	Stadium: Brunton Park; Attendance: 7,510 (445 away); Referee: Seb Stocksbridge

1 October 2024 9	Carlisle United	0–2	Notts County	Carlisle
19:45 BST	Vela (yellow card) 60'		Jatta 10'; Platt (yellow card) 16'; Robertson 34'; Abbott (yellow card) 62'; Bedeau (yellow card) 82'	Stadium: Brunton Park; Attendance: 5,594 (407 away); Referee: Zac Kennard-Kettle

5 October 2024 10	Colchester United	0–0	Carlisle United	Colchester
15:00 BST	Flanagan (yellow card) 82'; McDonnell (yellow card) 82'		Mellish (yellow card) 2'; Harper (yellow card) 25'; Neal (yellow card) 49'	Stadium: Colchester Community Stadium; Attendance: 4,392 (352 away); Referee: Thomas Parsons

12 October 2024 11	AFC Wimbledon	4–0	Carlisle United	Wimbledon
15:00 BST	Maycock (yellow card) 6'; Stevens 8', 39', 50'; Harper 45+3' (o.g.); Harbottle (yellow card) 56'		Barclay (yellow card) 34'; Vela (yellow card) 60'	Stadium: Plough Lane; Attendance: 8,331 (792 away); Referee: Neil Hair

19 October 2024 12	Carlisle United	1–1	Harrogate Town	Carlisle
15:00 BST	Neal (yellow card) 39'; Armstrong 44'; Mellish (yellow card) 74'; Robinson (yellow card) 82'		Daly 39'	Stadium: Brunton Park; Attendance: 8,297 (220 away); Referee: Richie Watkins

22 October 2024 13	Walsall	3–1	Carlisle United	Walsall
19:45 BST	Lowe 2'; Jellis (yellow card) 44' (goal) 49'; Matt (yellow card) 53' (goal) 56'		Thomas (yellow card) 22'; Lavelle (yellow card) 55'; Mellish 82'	Stadium: Bescot Stadium; Attendance: 4,939 (335 away); Referee: Scott Oldham

26 October 2024 14	Carlisle United	0–1	Cheltenham Town	Carlisle
15:00 BST	Robson (yellow card) 46'; Neal (yellow card) 69'; Mellish (yellow card) 82'; Sadi (yellow card) 83'		Archer 17'; Stubbs (yellow card) 29'; Young (yellow card) 55'; Payne (yellow card) 90+1'	Stadium: Brunton Park; Attendance: 6,064 (134 away); Referee: Scott Jackson

9 November 2024 15	Salford City	0–1	Carlisle United	Kersal
12:30 GMT	Mnoga (yellow card) 57'; Austerfield (yellow card) 74'		Adu-Adjei (yellow card) 28'; Neal (yellow card) 69'; Barclay 88'	Stadium: Moor Lane; Attendance: 3,737 (1,366 away); Referee: Ross Joyce
Note: Fixture was initially scheduled for a 15:00 kick-off, but was moved for live Sky Sports broadcast.

16 November 2024 16	Bromley	1–1	Carlisle United	Bromley
15:00 GMT	Cheek 54' (pen.); Thompson (yellow card) 57'; Leigh (red card) 83'	Report	Guy (yellow card) 37'; Mellish (yellow card) 43'; Burey (yellow card) 51'; Charters (yellow card) 67'; Lavelle (yellow card) 83'; Sadi (yellow card) 90'; Adu-Adjei 90+2'; Barclay (yellow card) 90+7'	Stadium: Hayes Lane; Attendance: 3,741 (482 away); Referee: James Durkin

23 November 2024 17	Carlisle United	0–0	Doncaster Rovers	Carlisle
15:00 GMT	Mellish (yellow card) 60'	Report	Maxwell (yellow card) 5'; Molyneux (yellow card) 31'; McGrath (yellow card) 45+1' (yellow-red card) 90+6'	Stadium: Brunton Park; Attendance: 6,837 (704 away); Referee: James Oldham

30 November 2024 18	Carlisle United	1–1	Crewe Alexandra	Carlisle
12:30 GMT	Sadi 3'; Harris (yellow card) 64'; Jones (yellow card) 72'; Neal (yellow card) 89'		Connolly (yellow card) 11'; Billington (yellow card) 12'; Lankester 82' (pen.)	Stadium: Brunton Park; Attendance: 5,839 (394 away); Referee: Elliot Bell
Note: Fixture was initially scheduled for 3 December, but was moved due to both sides exiting the FA Cup.

7 December 2024	Newport County	Postponed	Carlisle United	Newport
15:00 GMT				Stadium: Rodney Parade
Note: Fixture was postponed due to spectator and player safety concerns from Storm Darragh.

14 December 2024 20	Carlisle United	0–2	Chesterfield	Carlisle
15:00 GMT	Vela (yellow card) 32'; Kelly (yellow card) 53'; Hayden (yellow card) 67'		Markanday 25'; Grimes (yellow card) 52'; Banks (yellow card) 73'; Grigg 75'	Stadium: Brunton Park; Attendance: 6,586 (558 away); Referee: Scott Simpson

21 December 2024 21	Port Vale	0–0	Carlisle United	Burslem
15:00 GMT	Shorrock (yellow card) 30'		Jones (yellow card) 8'; Neal (yellow card) 29'; Harper (yellow card) 39'; Lavelle (yellow card) 90'; Mellish (yellow card) 90+2'	Stadium: Vale Park; Attendance: 6,920 (661 away); Referee: Edward Duckworth

26 December 2024 22	Carlisle United	0–1	Morecambe	Carlisle
15:00 GMT	Ellis (yellow card) 60'; Mellish (red card) 62'		Hendrie (yellow card) 37'; Edwards 61'; Lewis (yellow card) 89'; Tutonda (yellow card) 90+3'	Stadium: Brunton Park; Attendance: 9,225 (678 away)

29 December 2024 23	Carlisle United	2–1	Accrington Stanley	Carlisle
12:30 GMT	Harris 11'; Sadi (yellow card) 41'; Adu-Adjei (yellow card) 49'; Harper (yellow card) 50'; Armstrong 54'; Breeze (yellow card) 81'; Jones (yellow card) 90+2'		Rawson (yellow card) 29'; Khumbeni (yellow card) 58'; Whalley (yellow card) 66'; Walton (yellow card) 71' (goal) 73'; Hunter (yellow card) 74'	Stadium: Brunton Park; Attendance: 7,130 (288 away); Referee: Thomas Parsons
Note: Fixture was initially scheduled for a 15:00 kick-off, but was moved for live Sky Sports broadcast.

1 January 2025 24	Crewe Alexandra	3–2	Carlisle United	Crewe
15:00 GMT	Long 32'; Williams (yellow card) 35'; Knight-Lebel (yellow card) 86'; Conway (yellow card) 90+2'; Bogle 90+3'; Lankester 90+8'		Lavelle (yellow card) 8'; Ellis 21'; Neal (yellow card) 53'; Harris 78'; Breeze (yellow card) 84'; Biggins (yellow card) 90+6'	Stadium: Gresty Road; Attendance: 6,345 (924 away); Referee: Simon Mather

4 January 2025 25	Tranmere Rovers	1–0	Carlisle United	Birkenhead
15:00 GMT	Norman 23'; Patrick (yellow card) 38'; Davies (yellow card) 58'; Jennings (yellow card) 90+3'		Hayden (yellow card) 77'	Stadium: Prenton Park; Attendance: 6,856 (1,286 away); Referee: Seb Stocksbridge

11 January 2025	Carlisle United	Postponed	Milton Keynes Dons	Carlisle
15:00 GMT				Stadium: Brunton Park
Note: Fixture was postponed due to a frozen pitch.

18 January 2025 27	Carlisle United	0–1	Bradford City	Carlisle
12:30 GMT	McArthur (yellow card) 34'		Kavanagh 54'; Sarcevic; Richards (yellow card) 87'	Stadium: Brunton Park; Attendance: 8,399 (1,391 away); Referee: Ben Speedie
Note: Fixture was initially scheduled for a 15:00 kick-off, but was moved for live Sky Sports broadcasting.

25 January 2025 28	Fleetwood Town	1–2	Carlisle United	Fleetwood
15:00 GMT	Sarpong-Wiredu (yellow card) 18'; Potter (yellow card) 44'; Bennett (yellow card) 56'; Coughlan 70'; Rooney (yellow card) 90+2'		Scott 19'; Patching (yellow card) 23'; Embleton (yellow card) 70'; Lavelle 85'; Hugill (yellow card) 88'; Breeze (yellow card) 90+2'	Stadium: Highbury Stadium; Attendance: 3,517 (1,087 away); Referee: Matt Corlett

28 January 2025 29	Notts County	1–0	Carlisle United	Nottingham
19:45 GMT	McDonald (yellow card) 14'; Jatta 19'; McGoldrick (yellow card) 86'		Fusire (yellow card) 15'; McArthur (yellow card) 76'	Stadium: Meadow Lane; Attendance: 8,521 (455 away); Referee: Abigail Byrne

1 February 2025 30	Carlisle United	1–5	Swindon Town	Carlisle
15:00 GMT	Jones (yellow card) 36' (yellow-red card) 66'; Hugill 88'		Butterworth 45+2'; Drinan 47'; Smith (yellow card) 63'; Westley 83'; Delaney (yellow card) 89'; Glatzel 90'; Wright 90+6'	Stadium: Brunton Park; Attendance: 7,457 (433 away); Referee: Ross Joyce

8 February 2025 31	Grimsby Town	2–1	Carlisle United	Cleethorpes
15:00 GMT	Obikwu 62'; Khouri (yellow card) 71'; Rose 83' (pen.)		Lavelle 5' (yellow card) 51'; Hugill (yellow card) 44'; Embleton (yellow card) 75'; Robson (yellow card) 82'; Thomas (yellow card) 90+4'	Stadium: Blundell Park; Attendance: 5,788 (551 away); Referee: Zac Kennard-Kettle

11 February 2025 19	Newport County	1–0	Carlisle United	Newport
19:45 GMT	Evans (yellow card) 33'; Hudlin 76'		McArthur (yellow card) 36'; Whelan (yellow card) 47'; Williams (yellow card) 63'; Lavelle (yellow card) 90+1'	Stadium: Rodney Parade; Attendance: 3,992 (271 away); Referee: Paul Howard
Note: Fixture was originally scheduled for 7 December, but was postponed due to spectator and player safety concerns from Storm Darragh.

15 February 2025 32	Carlisle United	0–0	Colchester United	Carlisle
15:00 GMT	Patching (yellow card) 31'; McArthur (yellow card) 41'	Report	McDonnell (yellow card) 28'; Simpson (yellow card) 90+3'	Stadium: Brunton Park; Attendance: 7,021 (261 away); Referee: Jeremy Simpson

22 February 2025 33	Carlisle United	0–0	Gillingham	Carlisle
15:00 GMT	Ellis (yellow card) 80'; Harris (yellow card) 90+1'	Report	Hutton (yellow card) 6'; Ehmer (yellow card) 77'	Stadium: Brunton Park; Attendance: 6,976 (402 away); Referee: Scott Jackson

27 February 2025 34	Barrow	0–1	Carlisle United	Barrow-in-Furness
20:00 GMT	Cameron (yellow card) 36'; Canavan (yellow card) 81'		Dennis 19' (yellow card) 87'; Davies (yellow card) 90+2'	Stadium: Holker Street; Attendance: 4,213 (930 away); Referee: Adam Herczeg
Note: Fixture was originally scheduled for 1 March, but was moved for live Sky Sports broadcasting.

4 March 2025 35	Carlisle United	1–1	Walsall	Carlisle
19:45 GMT	Hayden 22', (yellow card) 85'; Embleton (yellow card) 60'; Davies (yellow card) 90+1'	Report	Allen 7'	Stadium: Brunton Park; Attendance: 6,378 (301 away); Referee: Paul Marsden

8 March 2025 36	Harrogate Town	1–0	Carlisle United	Harrogate
15:00 GMT	Taylor (yellow card) 26'; Morris (yellow card) 56'; Vela 90+5' (o.g.); Moon (yellow card) 90+5'		Davies (yellow card) 30'; Whelan (yellow card) 55'; Vela (yellow card) 67'; Hayden (yellow card) 67'	Stadium: Wetherby Road; Attendance: 4,136 (1,050 away); Referee: Seb Stockbridge

15 March 2025 37	Carlisle United	1–2	AFC Wimbledon	Carlisle
15:00 GMT	Dennis 67'; Lavelle (yellow card) 90+1'		Maycock 2'; Furlong (yellow card) 15'; Smith 49'; Hutchinson (yellow card) 87'	Stadium: Brunton Park; Attendance: 7,050 (511 away); Referee: Martin Woods

22 March 2025 38	Carlisle United	2–1	Bromley	Carlisle
15:00 GMT	Wearne 13'; Harris (penalty missed) 48'; Whelan 54'; Davies (yellow card) 56'; Harper (yellow card) 62'; Vela (yellow card) 69'; Bevan (yellow card) 90+4'		McKirdy 28' (yellow card) 28'; Webster (yellow card) 47'; Mayor (yellow card) 69'	Stadium: Brunton Park; Attendance: 6,515 (208 away); Referee: Bobby Madley

25 March 2025 26	Carlisle United	2–2	Milton Keynes Dons	Carlisle
19:45 GMT	Vela (yellow card) 3'; Dennis 26'; Harris 45+4'		Tomlinson 6'; Nemane (yellow card) 8'; Gilbey 37'	Stadium: Brunton Park; Attendance: 6,679 (134 away); Referee: Ben Speedie
Note: Fixture was originally scheduled for 11 January, but was postponed due to a frozen pitch.

29 March 2025 39	Doncaster Rovers	3–0	Carlisle United	Doncaster
15:00 GMT	Broadbent (yellow card) 18'; Bailey 36'; Gibson 68'; Sterry (yellow card) 69'; Clifton 73'			Stadium: Eco-Power Stadium; Attendance: 8,299 (1,017 away); Referee: Scott Oldham

1 April 2025 40	Chesterfield	2–1	Carlisle United	Chesterfield
19:45 BST	Mandeville 73'; Madden 81'		Embleton (red card) 40'; Hugill (yellow card) 70' (goal) 89'; Thomas (yellow card) 90+3'	Stadium: SMH Group Stadium; Attendance: 7,508 (309 away); Referee: Andrew Humphries

5 April 2025 41	Carlisle United	3–2	Newport County	Carlisle
15:00 BST	Kelly 33' 59'; Hayden (yellow card) 75' (goal) 84'; Dennis (yellow card) 90+2'; Bevan (yellow card) 90+4'		Evans 26'; Kamwa 28'; Martin (yellow card) 75'	Stadium: Brunton Park; Attendance: 5,889 (205 away); Referee: Ruebyn Ricardo

12 April 2025 42	Morecambe	0–2	Carlisle United	Morecambe
15:00 BST	Angol (yellow card) 36'		Kelly 28'; Whelan (yellow card) 38'; Thomas 60'; Breeze (yellow card) 75'	Stadium: Mazuma Mobile Stadium; Attendance: 4,901 (1,725 away); Referee: Ben Toner

18 April 2025 43	Carlisle United	3–2	Port Vale	Carlisle
15:00 BST	Kelly 36'; Dennis 43', (yellow card) 85' (yellow-red card) 90+4'; Hayden 49', (yellow card) 86'; Wearne (yellow card) 79'; Thomas (yellow card) 90+2'; Barclay (yellow card) 90+4'	Report	Stockley 61'; Byers (yellow card) 68'; Hart 70'; Tolaj (penalty missed) 90+3'	Stadium: Brunton Park; Attendance: 12,305 (1,510 away); Referee: Martin Woods

21 April 2025 44	Accrington Stanley	1–1	Carlisle United	Accrington
15:00 BST	Aljofree 69'; Love (yellow card) 90+3'		Whelan 90+2'; Hayden (yellow card) 90+4'	Stadium: Crown Ground; Attendance: 3,380 (1,050 away); Referee: Martin Coy

26 April 2025 45	Cheltenham Town	3–2	Carlisle United	Cheltenham
15:00 BST	Thomas 33' (pen.); Hay 45'; Jude-Boyd (yellow card) 81'; Miller 90+3'		Dennis (yellow card) 6' (goal) 29'; Breeze (yellow card) 32'; Hayden (yellow card) 33'; Kelly 73'	Stadium: Whaddon Road; Attendance: 4,963 (936 away); Referee: Tom Nield

3 May 2025 46	Carlisle United	2–2	Salford City	Carlisle
15:00 BST	Wearne 16'; Dennis 17'; Thomas (yellow card) 71'; Kelly (yellow card) 90+3'		Stockton 36'; Adelakun 62'	Stadium: Brunton Park; Attendance: 8,128 (724 away); Referee: Simon Mather

=== FA Cup ===
Carlisle United were drawn at home to Wigan Athletic in the first round.

Win Draw Loss Fixtures

2 November 2024 First round	Carlisle United	0–2 (a.e.t.)	Wigan Athletic	Carlisle
15:00 GMT	Robson (red card) 14'; Neal (yellow card) 61'; Lavelle (yellow card) 87'		Rankine (yellow card) 25'; Olakigbe (yellow card) 33'; S.Smith 105'; J.Smith 120+1'	Stadium: Brunton Park; Attendance: Martin Woods; Referee: 4,532 (1,257 away)

=== EFL Cup ===
On 27 June, the draw for the first round was made, with Carlisle being drawn at home against Stoke City.

Win Draw Loss Fixtures

13 August 2024 First round	Carlisle United	0–2	Stoke City	Carlisle
19:45 BST		Report	Anderson 48'; Tezgel 79'	Stadium: Brunton Park; Attendance: 4,441 (894 away); Referee: Ben Toner

=== EFL Trophy ===
In the group stage, Carlisle were drawn into Northern Group C alongside Morecambe, Wigan Athletic and Nottingham Forest U21.

Pos	Div	Team	Pld	W	PW	PL	L	GF	GA	GD	Pts	Qualification
1	L2	Morecambe	3	2	0	0	1	7	5	+2	6	Advance to Round 2
2	L1	Wigan Athletic	3	1	1	0	1	3	2	+1	5	Advance to Round 2
3	ACA	Nottingham Forest U21	3	1	0	1	1	4	5	−1	4	
4	L2	Carlisle United	3	1	0	0	2	3	5	−2	3	

Source: EFL

Win Draw Loss Fixtures

3 September 2024 Group stage	Carlisle United	1–2	Nottingham Forest U21	Carlisle
19:00 BST	Allan 88'; Neal (yellow card) 90+1'	Report	Gardner 31'; McAdam (yellow card) 60'; Whitehall 90+4'	Stadium: Brunton Park; Attendance: 1,102 (56 away); Referee: James Westgate

8 October 2024 Group stage	Carlisle United	0–2	Wigan Athletic	Carlisle
19:00 BST		Report	Stones 7' (pen.); Olakigbe 23'; Smith (yellow card) 32'; Thomas (yellow card) 68'	Stadium: Brunton Park; Attendance: 1,117 (195 away); Referee: Steven Copeland

12 November 2024 Group stage	Morecambe	1–2	Carlisle United	Morecambe
19:00 BST	Hope 16'; Snowball (yellow card) 45+1'; Lewis (yellow card) 76'		O'Donoghue 75'; Williams 78'	Stadium: Mazuma Mobile Stadium; Attendance: 788 (155 away); Referee: Edward Duckworth

== Statistics ==
=== Appearances and goals ===
As of match played 3 May 2025

Players with no appearances are not included on the list

No.	Pos	Nat	Player	Total		League Two		FA Cup		EFL Cup		EFL Trophy	
No.	Pos	Nat	Player	Apps	Goals	Apps	Goals	Apps	Goals	Apps	Goals	Apps	Goals
1	GK	(England) ENG	Harry Lewis	16	0	14	0	0	0	1	0	1	0
2	DF	(England) ENG	Archie Davies	20	1	20	1	0	0	0	0	0	0
3	DF	(Scotland) SCO	Cameron Harper	39	0	30+6	0	0+1	0	0	0	2	0
4	DF	(Saint Lucia) LCA	Terell Thomas	34	1	29+3	1	1	0	1	0	0	0
5	DF	(Scotland) SCO	Samuel Lavelle	40	4	35+2	4	1	0	0+1	0	1	0
6	DF	(England) ENG	Aaron Hayden	26	3	23+1	3	1	0	1	0	0	0
8	MF	(England) ENG	Callum Guy	21	0	12+8	0	0	0	0	0	0+1	0
9	FW	(Republic of Ireland) IRL	Georgie Kelly	18	5	7+11	5	0	0	0	0	0	0
10	FW	(England) ENG	Charlie Wyke	14	2	10+3	2	0	0	1	0	0	0
11	MF	(Northern Ireland) NIR	Jordan Jones	21	0	17+4	0	0	0	0	0	0	0
13	GK	(England) ENG	Gabriel Breeze	35	0	32	0	1	0	0	0	2	0
14	DF	(Wales) WAL	Paul Dummett	3	0	1+2	0	0	0	0	0	0	0
16	MF	(England) ENG	Josh Vela	30	0	17+11	0	0	0	1	0	1	0
17	FW	(England) ENG	Joe Hugill	16	2	8+8	2	0	0	0	0	0	0
18	DF	(England) ENG	Jack Ellis	26	1	9+12	1	0+1	0	1	0	3	0
19	FW	(England) ENG	Matthew Dennis	14	6	11+3	6	0	0	0	0	0	0
20	FW	(England) ENG	Cedwyn Scott	11	1	5+6	1	0	0	0	0	0	0
21	MF	(Scotland) SCO	Dylan McGeouch	7	0	3+3	0	0	0	0	0	1	0
22	DF	(Scotland) SCO	Charlie McArthur	10	0	8+2	0	0	0	0	0	0	0
24	DF	(England) ENG	Josh Williams	6	0	6	0	0	0	0	0	0	0
25	FW	(Ukraine) UKR	Anton Dudik	2	0	0+1	0	0	0	0	0	1	0
26	DF	(England) ENG	Ben Barclay	26	1	14+8	1	0+1	0	1	0	2	0
27	MF	(England) ENG	Jake Allan	2	1	0	0	0	0	0	0	1+1	1
28	DF	(England) ENG	Aran Fitzpatrick	2	0	0	0	0	0	0	0	0+2	0
31	MF	(England) ENG	Sam Hetherington	3	0	0	0	0	0	0	0	3	0
32	FW	Isle of Man	Freddie O'Donoghue	5	1	0+2	0	0	0	0	0	1+2	1
33	DF	(England) ENG	Haydon Atkinson	2	0	0	0	0	0	0	0	1+1	0
34	MF	(England) ENG	Dan Hopper	1	0	0	0	0	0	0	0	0+1	0
35	MF	(England) ENG	Seb Mason	1	0	0	0	0	0	0	0	0+1	0
36	MF	(England) ENG	Jonah Lowes	1	0	0	0	0	0	0	0	0+1	0
37	FW	(Scotland) SCO	Joe Bevan	14	0	3+11	0	0	0	0	0	0	0
39	FW	(England) ENG	Stephen Wearne	18	2	13+5	2	0	0	0	0	0	0
40	MF	(England) ENG	Kadeem Harris	31	3	26+4	3	0	0	0	0	1	0
42	MF	(England) ENG	Will Patching	10	0	6+4	0	0	0	0	0	0	0
43	MF	(England) ENG	Callum Whelan	23	2	22+1	2	0	0	0	0	0	0
44	MF	(England) ENG	Elliot Embleton	18	0	11+7	0	0	0	0	0	0	0
45	MF	(England) ENG	Sean Fusire	14	0	8+6	0	0	0	0	0	0	0
Player(s) who featured whilst on loan but returned to parent club during the season:
12	MF	(England) ENG	Harrison Biggins	17	0	13+4	0	0	0	0	0	0	0
14	FW	(England) ENG	Daniel Adu-Adjei	17	2	11+3	2	1	0	1	0	1	0
24	FW	(England) ENG	Dominic Sadi	25	2	17+5	2	1	0	0	0	2	0
Player(s) who featured but departed the club permanently during the season:
11	FW	(England) ENG	Danny Butterworth	4	0	0+3	0	0	0	0+1	0	0	0
17	MF	(England) ENG	Harrison Neal	26	1	13+8	1	1	0	1	0	2+1	0
19	DF	(England) ENG	Jack Robinson	6	0	0+3	0	0+1	0	0	0	2	0
20	DF	(Wales) WAL	Ben Williams	11	1	8	0	0	0	0+1	0	0+2	1
22	DF	(England) ENG	Jon Mellish	27	2	21+2	2	1	0	1	0	2	0
37	FW	(England) ENG	Tyler Burey	11	0	5+5	0	1	0	0	0	0	0
Player(s) who featured but departed the club on loan during the season:
7	MF	(England) ENG	Ethan Robson	8	0	1+6	0	1	0	0	0	0	0
15	MF	(England) ENG	Taylor Charters	9	0	2+4	0	1	0	0	0	1+1	0
29	FW	(England) ENG	Luke Armstrong	23	3	12+7	3	0+1	0	0+1	0	2	0
