= Stephen Wearne (English footballer) =

English footballer (born 2000)

Personal information
- Full name: Stephen Christopher Wearne
- Date of birth: 16 December 2000 (age 25)
- Place of birth: Stockton-on-Tees, England
- Height: 1.81 m (5 ft 11 in)
- Position: Attacking midfielder

Team information
- Current team: Carlisle United
- Number: 20

Youth career
- –2017: Newcastle United
- 2017–2019: Middlesbrough

Senior career*
Years	Team	Apps	(Gls)
2019–2020	Middlesbrough	0	(0)
2020–2022	Sunderland	0	(0)
2022	→ Torquay United (loan)	14	(3)
2022–2023	Grimsby Town	8	(0)
2022–2023	→ Torquay United (loan)	9	(0)
2023–2024	Gateshead	34	(12)
2024–2025	Milton Keynes Dons	28	(4)
2025–	Carlisle United	55	(5)
- * Club domestic league appearances and goals as of 13:57, 7 June 2026 (UTC)

Stephen Christopher Wearne (born 16 December 2000) is an English professional footballer who plays as an attacking midfielder for club Carlisle United.

Wearne came through the youth academies of Newcastle United and Middlesbrough before signing professional terms with Sunderland. His previous clubs include Gateshead, Milton Keynes Dons, Grimsby Town and Torquay United.

== Playing career ==
=== Early career ===
A youth product of Newcastle United and Middlesbrough, he signed his first professional contract with Middlesbrough on 15 April 2019.

=== Sunderland ===
He transferred to Sunderland on 9 September 2020. He made his professional debut with Sunderland in a 2–1 EFL Trophy win over Lincoln City on 5 October 2021, scoring the game-winning goal in the 72nd minute.

On 7 January 2022, Wearne joined National League side Torquay United on loan for the remainder of the 2021–22 season. He returned to Sunderland, and was later released following the clubs promotion to the EFL Championship.

=== Grimsby Town ===
On 27 June 2022, Wearne signed for EFL League Two side Grimsby Town on a one-year deal. Upon signing, Wearne said he was convinced to sign for Grimsby when he was on holiday in Cancun, Mexico with his girlfriend. "Other managers were pressuring me to make a decision. I said to her - I need a sign. I went to bed that night, next morning, I came out of the lift and the first guy I see has a Grimsby top on. And I just said, 'That's the sign'. It's done".

On 9 August, Wearne scored his first goal for The Mariners in a 4–0 win over Crewe Alexandra in the EFL Cup first round.

On 1 November 2022, Wearne returned to National League side Torquay United on a one-month loan. Wearne played his first game back later that day and assisted the fourth goal in a 6–1 win over Aldershot Town. His loan was extended for a further month on 2 December 2022.

=== Gateshead ===
On 24 March 2023, Wearne signed for Gateshead on a free transfer until the end of the 2022-23 season. Wearne scored his first Gateshead goal against Scunthorpe United in a 2–0 win on 7 April 2023. On 27 May 2023, signed a two-year contract with Gateshead. He was awarded the National League Player of the Month award for November 2023 having scored five goals in four matches.

=== Milton Keynes Dons ===
On 6 January 2024, Wearne returned to the EFL with a permanent transfer to League Two club Milton Keynes Dons, signing for an undisclosed fee and reuniting with former Gateshead head coach Mike Williamson. Having joined the club with a slight injury, Wearne made his debut on 27 January 2024 as a 76th-minute substitute. He went on to make an assist just twelve minutes later for the winning goal in a 2–1 home win over Gillingham.

=== Carlisle United ===
On 13 January 2025, Wearne once again returned to a club under the management of Mike Williamson, who had previously managed Wearne at both Gateshead and MK Dons, joining Carlisle United for an undisclosed fee.

== Career statistics ==
As of 4 October 2025

Appearances and goals by club, season and competition
Club	Season	League			FA Cup		EFL Cup		Other		Total	
Club	Season	Division	Apps	Goals	Apps	Goals	Apps	Goals	Apps	Goals	Apps	Goals
Gateshead	2022–23	National League	11	1	0	0	—		0	0	11	1
Gateshead	2023–24	National League	23	11	1	0	—		0	0	24	11
Gateshead	Total		34	12	1	0	—		0	0	35	12
Milton Keynes Dons	2023–24	League Two	17	4	—		—		2 (Note: Appearance(s) in 2023–24 League Two play-offs)	0	19	4
Milton Keynes Dons	2024–25	League Two	11	0	1	0	1	0	1 (Note: Appearance(s) in EFL Trophy)	1	14	1
Milton Keynes Dons	Total		28	4	1	0	1	0	3	1	33	5
Carlisle United	2024–25	League Two	18	2	—		—		—		18	2
Carlisle United	2025–26	National League	14	0	0	0	0	0	0	0	14	0
Career total			66	17	1	0	0	0	2	0	69	17

== Honours ==
Individual

- National League Player of the Month: November 2023
