= Gabriel Breeze =

English footballer

- Breeze with Cambridge United in 2026

Personal information
- Full name: Gabriel Hendrix Breeze
- Date of birth: 30 December 2003 (age 22)
- Place of birth: Penrith, Cumbria, England
- Height: 1.87 m (6 ft 2 in)
- Position: Goalkeeper

Team information
- Current team: Cambridge United
- Number: 13

Youth career
- –2022: Carlisle United

Senior career*
Years	Team	Apps	(Gls)
2022–2026	Carlisle United	81	(0)
2022	→ Widnes (loan)	2	(0)
2026-	Cambridge United	0	(0)
- * Club domestic league appearances and goals as of 08:20, 4 November 2026 (UTC)

Gabriel Hendrix Breeze (born 30 December 2003) is an English footballer who plays as a goalkeeper for EFL League One club Cambridge United.

== Early life ==
Breeze was born on 30 December 2003, alongside his fraternal twin brother, Geordie Breeze, at Cumberland Infirmary in Carlisle. He grew up in Penrith, Cumbria, where he attended Queen Elizabeth Grammar School. He left the school after completing his GCSEs, to join Carlisle United's youth squad after gaining a scholarship.

During his adolescence, Breeze played football for his school team and represented several local-league clubs, including Castletown Athletic, Castletown Dragons and Castletown United, primarily as a goalkeeper.

== Career ==
In June 2021, just halfway through his scholarship programme, Breeze signed a two-year professional deal with his hometown club Carlisle United, whom he had joined as a teenager. In September 2022, Breeze joined Northern Premier League West Division club Widnes on an initial one-month loan deal. He had an extension clause in his contract activated at the end of the 2022–23 season.

On 26 December 2023, Breeze made his senior debut for Carlisle in a League One fixture with Fleetwood Town. Having made a further three league appearances under Paul Simpson, he was rewarded with a new three-year contract in February 2024.

Breeze quickly became Carlisle United's number one goalkeeper under Mike Williamson and Mark Hughes throughout the 2024/25 season and the 2025/26 season.

On 12 August 2026, Breeze signed with League One club Cambridge United on a three-year deal.

== Career statistics ==
As of match played 3 November 2026

Appearances and goals by club, season and competition
Club	Season	League			FA Cup		League Cup		Other		Total	
Club	Season	Division	Apps	Goals	Apps	Goals	Apps	Goals	Apps	Goals	Apps	Goals
Carlisle United	2022–23	League Two	0	0	0	0	0	0	0	0	0	0
Carlisle United	2023–24	League One	4	0	0	0	0	0	0	0	4	0
Carlisle United	2024–25	League Two	32	0	1	0	0	0	2 (Note: Appearance(s) in EFL Trophy)	0	35	0
Carlisle United	2025–26	National League	45	0	0	0	—		1 (Note: Appearance in National League Play-offs)	0	46	0
Total			81	0	1	0	0	0	3	0	85	0
Widnes (loan)	2022–23	NPL West Division	2	0	0	0	—		0	0	2	0
Cambridge United	2026–27	League One	0	0	0	0	0	0	3	0	3	0
Career total			48	0	1	0	0	0	6	0	90	0
