= Matthew Dennis (English footballer) =

English footballer (born 2002)

Personal information
- Full name: Matthew Timothy Dennis
- Date of birth: 15 April 2002 (age 24)
- Place of birth: Hammersmith and Fulham, England
- Height: 5 ft 9 in (1.76 m)
- Position: Forward

Team information
- Current team: Burton Albion
- Number: 19

Youth career
- 2008–2020: Arsenal

Senior career*
Years	Team	Apps	(Gls)
2020–2022	Norwich City	0	(0)
2021–2022	→ Southend United (loan)	27	(7)
2022–2025	Milton Keynes Dons	34	(5)
2023	→ Sutton United (loan)	10	(0)
2024–2025	→ Rochdale (loan)	4	(0)
2025	Carlisle United	14	(6)
2025–2026	Notts County	42	(14)
2026–	Burton Albion	0	(0)

International career
2017	England U15	1	(0)
2017	England U16	1	(0)
- * Club domestic league appearances and goals as of 12:14, 4 July 2026 (UTC)

Matthew Timothy Dennis (born 15 April 2002) is an English professional footballer who plays as a forward for EFL League One club Burton Albion. A fast and athletic striker, he has been capped by England up to under-16 level.

Dennis spent 12 years in the Academy system at Arsenal before he joined Norwich City in July 2020. He did not play a first-team game for the club, though he did have a successful spell with Southend United on loan in the National League. In July 2020, he was signed by Milton Keynes Dons for an undisclosed fee. He went on to spend time on loan at Sutton United and Rochdale. He left MK Dons in February and signed with Carlisle United, ending the 2024–25 season as the club's top scorer.

== Club career ==
=== Arsenal ===
While playing for his local team in a tournament in Mill Hill, Dennis was scouted by Premier League clubs Arsenal and Chelsea. He had trials with both, but chose Arsenal as he supported them. He signed a scholarship with Arsenal in June 2018. In the academy, he went on to progress through various age groups. He later featured regularly for the club's U18 and U23 sides.

=== Norwich City ===
On 28 July 2020, Dennis signed a two-year deal with Championship club Norwich City following the expiry of his contract with Arsenal. He was placed in the club's development squad under the tuteledge of David Wright. In his first season, he featured for the club's U23 side in the EFL Trophy, scoring twice in four games, whilst scoring five goals in 21 Premier League 2 games. On 13 August 2021, Dennis was sent out on loan to National League club Southend United for the duration of the 2021–22 season after impressing manager Phil Brown in six friendly games. He was voted Southend's Player of the Month for January, being described as "an integral part to Blues' three-pronged attack in their revival since the turn of the year". His loan spell led to him being tracked by numerous English Football League (EFL) clubs. He went on to make 30 appearances and score eight goals for the Shrimpers before returning to Norwich, who activated a one-year extension in his contract. Southend manager Kevin Maher had tried to convince Dennis to come back to Roots Hall on a permanent basis.

=== Milton Keynes Dons ===
On 4 June 2022, Dennis signed for League One club Milton Keynes Dons for an undisclosed fee. He made his debut in the EFL on 30 July as an 82nd-minute substitute in a 1–0 defeat away to Cambridge United. He scored his first goal for the club on 23 August, in a 2–0 EFL Cup second round away win over Watford. He scored a brace against West Ham United U21 in the EFL Trophy, after which he credited head coach Liam Manning for showing faith in him. He scored six goals in 27 appearances for the Dons, featuring more frequently than was initially expected due to injuries to Will Grigg and Mohamed Eisa, though he dropped down the pecking order after new boss Mark Jackson signed Jonathan Leko, Sullay Kaikai and Max Dean in the January transfer window. On 27 January, he joined League Two club Sutton United on loan until the end of the 2022–23 season. He played ten games for Matt Gray's U's, though did not score a goal during his time at Gander Green Lane. Upon returning to Stadium MK, manager Mike Williamson said he needed to show consistency in order to win a first-team place. The club had been relegated in his absence.

New head coach Graham Alexander said that Dennis had to improve his fitness after he spent much of the 2023–24 pre-season out injured. He went on to finish the campaign with five goals in 17 games, including a brace in a 3–1 home win over Crewe Alexandra that saw him named the division's fourth-best performer of the weekend. He made two substitute appearances at the start of the 2024–25 campaign before falling out of first-team contention. On 31 October, Dennis joined National League club Rochdale on loan until January 2025. Dons head coach Scott Lindsey said that Dennis needed to play competitive games and would get the opportunity to do so at Spotland. He played ten games for the Dale, scoring one goal in the FA Trophy. Dennis left Milton Keynes Dons on 3 February 2025 after his contract was terminated by mutual consent.

=== Carlisle United ===
On 11 February 2025, Dennis joined League Two club Carlisle United on a short-term contract until the end of the 2024–25 season. The club were five points behind the relegation zone with 17 games left to play. Manager Mark Hughes said in March that Dennis had "grown into the role" as the Cumbrians focal point in attack. His six goals in 14 games made him the club's top-scorer, which was the lowest top-scorer tally in the club's history. Carlisle were relegated into non-League football and Dennis was offered a new contract to try and keep him at Brunton Park.

=== Notts County ===
On 4 June 2025, having rejected the contract offer from Carlisle United, Dennis agreed to join League Two side Notts County on a three-year deal. He was named EFL League Two Player of the Month for August 2025 having scored five goals in is first six matches.

=== Burton Albion ===
On 4 July 2026, Dennis signed a three year contract at Burton Albion for an undisclosed fee.

== International career ==
Dennis played as a right-back for the England under-15 team against Belgium alongside Cole Palmer, Jude Bellingham and Jamal Musiala in 2017. He also won a cap for the under-16 team in a 2–1 win over Romania on 26 August 2017.

== Style of play ==
Dennis describes himself as a "fast, powerful forward who likes to get in behind".

== Career statistics ==
As of match played 3 May 2025

Appearances and goals by club, season and competition
Club	Season	League			FA Cup		EFL Cup		Other		Total	
Club	Season	Division	Apps	Goals	Apps	Goals	Apps	Goals	Apps	Goals	Apps	Goals
Norwich City U23	2020–21	—							4 (Note: Appearance(s) in EFL Trophy)	2	4	2
Southend United (loan)	2021–22	National League	27	7	1	0	—		2 (Note: Appearance(s) in FA Trophy)	1	30	8
Milton Keynes Dons	2022–23	League One	18	1	0	0	4	2	5	3	27	6
Milton Keynes Dons	2023–24	League Two	14	4	0	0	0	0	3	1	17	5
Milton Keynes Dons	2024–25	League Two	2	0	0	0	0	0	0	0	2	0
Milton Keynes Dons	Total		34	5	0	0	4	2	8	4	46	11
Sutton United (loan)	2022–23	League Two	10	0	—		—		—		10	0
Rochdale (loan)	2024–25	National League	4	0	1	0	—		5 (Note: Three appearances in National League Cup, two appearances and one goal in FA Trophy)	1	10	1
Carlisle United	2024–25	League Two	14	6	—		—		—		14	6
Notts County	2025–26	League Two	42	14	1	0	1	0	1	0	45	14
Burton Albion	2026–27	League One	0	0	0	0	0	0	0	0	0	0
Career total			131	32	3	0	5	2	20	8	159	42

== Honours ==
Notts County

- EFL League Two play-offs: 2026

Individual

- EFL League Two Player of the Month: August 2025
