= Regan Linney =

English footballer (born 1997)

Personal information
- Full name: Regan Martyn Linney
- Date of birth: 12 May 1997 (age 29)
- Place of birth: Preston, England
- Position: Forward

Team information
- Current team: Carlisle United
- Number: 10

Youth career
- Bamber Bridge

Senior career*
Years	Team	Apps	(Gls)
2015–2019	Bamber Bridge		
2019–2023	FC United of Manchester	89	(40)
2023–2025	Altrincham	91	(42)
2025–	Carlisle United	52	(23)
- * Club domestic league appearances and goals as of 23:27, 29 September 2026 (UTC)

Regan Martyn Linney (born 12 May 1997) is an English professional footballer who plays as a forward for National League club Carlisle United.

== Career ==
=== Bamber Bridge ===
Linney came through the youth set-up at Bamber Bridge, making his senior debut aged 17.

=== FC United of Manchester ===
In July 2019, Linney signed for FC United of Manchester, where he scored 40 goals in 89 appearances in all competitions.

=== Altrincham ===
Linney joined Altrincham in February 2023 for an undisclosed fee. He went on to become a key attacking player, finishing the 2024–25 season with 25 goals in all competitions and earning selection in the National League Team of the Season.

=== Carlisle United ===
On 30 May 2025, Linney signed a three-year contract with Carlisle United.
