= Aran Fitzpatrick =

English footballer (born 2006)

Personal information
- Date of birth: 7 February 2006 (age 20)
- Position: Defender

Team information
- Current team: Workington

Senior career*
Years	Team	Apps	(Gls)
2024–2025	Carlisle United	1	(0)
2024	→ Workington (loan)	8	(0)
2024	→ Workington (loan)	1	(0)
2025	→ Workington (loan)	0	(0)
2025–	Workington	0	(0)
- * Club domestic league appearances and goals as of 11:02, 14 September 2024 (UTC)

Aran Fitzpatrick (born 7 February 2006) is an English footballer who plays as a defender for Workington on loan from National League club Carlisle United.

== Career ==
Fitzpatrick joined the Carlisle United Academy, progressing through to the under-18 scholarship programme. In February 2024, he joined Northern Premier League Premier Division club Workington on loan. In April 2024, he was offered a third-year scholarship and, following injury to first-team left back Jack Robinson, Fitzpatrick was recalled by Carlisle to offer cover.

On 20 April 2024, Fitzpatrick made his senior Carlisle United debut as a substitute in a 3–1 home defeat to Wycombe Wanderers.

On 10 September 2024, Fitzpatrick returned to Workington on loan until 31 December 2024.

== Career statistics ==
As of end of 2023–24 season

Appearances and goals by club, season and competition
Club	Season	League			FA Cup		League Cup		Other		Total	
Club	Season	Division	Apps	Goals	Apps	Goals	Apps	Goals	Apps	Goals	Apps	Goals
Carlisle United	2023–24	League One	1	0	0	0	0	0	0	0	1	0
Workington (loan)	2023–24	NPL Premier Division	8	0	0	0	—		0	0	8	0
Career total			9	0	0	0	0	0	0	0	9	0
