= Dominic Sadi =

English footballer (born 2003)

Personal information
- Full name: Dominic Wadi Sadi
- Date of birth: 2 September 2003 (age 23)
- Place of birth: Enfield, England
- Height: 5 ft 9 in (1.74 m)
- Position: Midfielder

Team information
- Current team: Novi Pazar
- Number: 10

Youth career
- West Ham United

Senior career*
Years	Team	Apps	(Gls)
2021–2022	Wingate & Finchley	3	(1)
2022–2026	AFC Bournemouth	1	(0)
2024–2025	→ Carlisle United (loan)	22	(2)
2025	→ Novi Pazar (loan)	8	(2)
2026–	Novi Pazar	14	(3)
- * Club domestic league appearances and goals as of 12 June 2026

Dominic Wadi Sadi (born 2 September 2003) is an English professional footballer who plays as a midfielder for Serbian SuperLiga side Novi Pazar.

== Career ==
Sadi was in the youth academy at West Ham United, earning a two-year scholarship before being released. After his time at West Ham, Sadi joined Wingate & Finchley in the Isthmian League Premier Division, where he made six appearances in all competitions, scoring twice. He scored on his debut for Wingate and Finchley in a 3–0 win over Baldock Town in September, 2021 in the FA Cup. In May, 2022 Sadi signed with AFC Bournemouth. Over the summer of 2022 he trained with the Bournemouth first team squad on the clubs pre-season training camps.

On 23 August 2022, Sadi made his pro debut for Bournemouth during a 2–2 win on penalties over Norwich City in the League Cup second round, getting an assist for a late equaliser scored by, fellow debutant, Brooklyn Genesini in the 92nd minute of normal time.

He joined Carlisle United on a season-long loan in August 2024. He was recalled in January 2025.

On 17 September 2025, Sadi joined Serbian SuperLiga side Novi Pazar on a season-long loan deal. He scored his first league goal for the club in a 2–1 win against FK Napredak Kruševac on 29 November 2025. After ten appearances, he was recalled to Bournemouth in January 2026. The following month, he returned to Novi Pazar, this time joining on a permanent deal.
