= History of Carlisle United F.C. =

History of an English football club

Carlisle United F.C. is an English football club based in Carlisle, Cumbria. It was formed in 1904. They have played at Brunton Park since 1909

== Formation ==
The club was formed on 17 May 1904 at Shaddongate United's Annual General Meeting when the club's members voted to change the club's name to Carlisle United. The newly formed club initially played at Milhome Bank and later at Devonshire Park, finally settling at their current home Brunton Park situated on Warwick Road.

There is a myth that still persists to this day that the club was formed from the amalgamation of Shaddongate United and Carlisle Red Rose, but this was disproven as it was seen that Carlisle United actually defeated Carlisle Red Rose 3–0 in the 1905–06 FA Cup.

== Early years ==
Carlisle was elected to the Football League Third Division North in 1928 replacing Durham City. They won their first game in the league, the side of Prout, Coulthard, Cook, Harrison, Ross, Pigg, Agar, Hutchison, McConnell, Ward and Watson beating Accrington Stanley 3–2.

In 1949, the club had the distinction of being the first club to appoint Bill Shankly as their manager. Shankly later went on to manage Workington and then Grimsby Town before being appointed manager of Liverpool in 1959; over the next 15 years he would guide the club to numerous trophy successes and became one of the most iconic figures in Liverpool's history.

Ivor Broadis was appointed player manager after the end of the Second World War making him the youngest league club manager in history. Broadis then had the distinction of becoming the first manager to transfer himself when he moved to Sunderland. Broadis returned as an 18 times capped ex England international in mid-1950s to add to his playing career at Brunton Park.

Carlisle were members of the Third Division North until 1958, and Fourth Division until they won their first promotion.

== Golden era ==
Carlisle were promoted from the fourth division in 1962. They then won consecutive promotions in 1964 and 1965, and established themselves as a Second Division side.

They were promoted to the First Division for the 1974–75 season. Carlisle won their first three fixtures of the top division campaign to top the English football pyramid, with the likes of Chris Balderstone (it was Balderstone's penalty that put Carlisle top) and Bobby Parker who both made at least 375 league appearances for Carlisle. However the success was short-lived, and they finished the season in bottom place and were relegated. Highlight victories include doing a double over Everton, and home victories over eventual champions Derby, and former titlists Chelsea, Ipswich, Arsenal, Burnley, Tottenham and Wolves. Carlisle also beat former champions Chelsea in the opening game of the season at Stamford Bridge. Chelsea's new East Stand was opened for the first time and the game featured on Match of the Day.

== Late 20th century ==
Another relegation followed in 1977 before returning to the Second Division in 1982 under Bob Stokoe. With players like Malcolm Poskett and Tommy Craig, they mounted a promotion challenge in the 1983–84 season but finished 7th after a late slump, and consecutive relegations followed in 1986 and 1987.

The 1987–88 season saw Carlisle in the Fourth Division for the first time in nearly a quarter of a century. They finished second from bottom in the league, 19 points ahead of the relegated Newport County. They reached the FA Cup third round, where they lost to defending league champions and eventual FA Cup winners Liverpool. A playoff position was nearly achieved 1989–90 season, but a 5–2 defeat to Maidstone United on the final day of the season meant that Carlisle remained in the Fourth Division. The following season ended with the Cumbrians 20th in the final table and cost manager Clive Middlemass his job in March. He was succeeded by Aidan McCaffrey. 1991–92 was worse still. Carlisle finished bottom of the Fourth Division, but fortuitously, due to the demise of Aldershot combined with the Football League's plan to expand to 94 clubs, no relegation to the Football Conference took part that year.

In the 1992 close season, Michael Knighton took Carlisle and within weeks had sacked manager Aidan McCaffrey following a terrible start to the new Division Three campaign. David McCreery, 35, was appointed player-manager and steered Carlisle to safety as they finished 18th in the final table.

1993–94 began with much promise with Michael Knighton announced his intention to deliver Premier League football to Carlisle by 2004. He re-organised the management team to appoint Mick Wadsworth as Director of Coaching, while David McCreery was given the role of Head Coach and 38-year-old goalkeeper Mervyn Day was named as Assistant Coach. This season was Carlisle's best in years, as the £121,000 record signing of striker Dave Reeves in October saw them acquire a much-needed prolific goalscorer. They won 10 of their final 14 league games to secure the final playoff place in Division Three, though their promotion dream was ended by Wycombe Wanderers in the semi-finals.

In 1994–95, Carlisle finally achieved their first major success in 13 years by lifting the Division Three title. David Reeves scored 25 league goals to help Carlisle achieve their long-awaited success which ended their eight-year ordeal in the league's basement division. They also reached the Autoglass Windscreens Trophy Final but missed out on the trophy after conceding a sudden death extra time goal against Birmingham City.

The following season was a tough one for Carlisle. Mick Wadsworth's resignation as manager in December was a major blow to Carlisle, as was the mid-season sale of key players Paul Murray and Tony Gallimore. They finished the season clear of the relegation zone with more goals than 21st-placed York City, who had to replay a game against Brighton and Hove Albion which had been abandoned due to crowd trouble. But a 3–1 victory for York sent Carlisle down, just one season after they had won promotion to Division Two. In 1996–97, young players like Rory Delap, Matt Jansen and Lee Peacock were crucial as Carlisle bounced back from relegation to achieve promotion back to Division Two at the first time of asking. The promotion joy was accompanied by a penalty shoot-out triumph over Colchester United in the Auto Windscreens Trophy Final, in which Tony Caig pulled off some impressive goalkeeping heroics.

Mervyn Day was sacked just six games into the 1997–98, and chairman Michael Knighton promptly installed himself as manager. They were still in the relegation zone come Christmas, they did manage to climb clear. But nine defeats from their final 10 games condemned Carlisle to relegation in 23rd place, with 17 goals from striker Ian Stevens not being quite enough to attain survival.

Carlisle entered the final game of the 1998–99 season needing to beat Plymouth Argyle at Brunton Park to avoid relegation and possibly extinction, and the score was still 1–1 at full-time. The referee allowed four minutes of stoppage time and during the final minute Carlisle were awarded a corner. Goalkeeper Jimmy Glass, signed in an emergency loan deal after the transfer deadline, drove home a last-gasp winner which preserved Carlisle's Football League status and sent down Scarborough.

== 21st century ==
Once again, Carlisle narrowly avoided relegation in 1999–2000, finishing in second from bottom place in Division Three. They lost their final game of the season 1–0 to Brighton and Hove Albion, but were kept up by Chester City's defeat at the hands of Peterborough United.

2000–01 saw Ian Atkins appointed at the Carlisle helm and there was much hope that he could be the man to achieve promotion. But things didn't work out, and they finished 22nd. Atkins quit at the end of the season and was succeeded by Roddy Collins. In 2001–02 Carlisle attained a safe final position of 17th – which saw them finish 16 points clear of the relegation zone.

For the fourth time in five seasons, Carlisle narrowly avoided relegation in 2002–03. This time, 22nd place was just one place above the drop zone, as this was the first season in which two clubs were relegated to the Conference instead of just one.

Carlisle lost 18 of their first 21 Division Three games of the 2003–04 season. Paul Simpson's side picked up 40 points from a possible 75 but were still relegated; had they performed as well during the first half of the campaign as they did during the second, then they would have featured in the promotion push. Carlisle United thus became the first club to compete in all top five tiers of the English football league system (Oxford United, Luton Town, Grimsby Town and Leyton Orient have since followed).

In 2004–05, Carlisle returned to the Football League at the first time of asking by winning the Conference National promotion playoffs.

Carlisle's excellent form under Paul Simpson continued into the following season as they returned to the Football League with a bang, clinching the League Two title. Simpson then departed for Preston North End, and was succeeded by Neil McDonald.

In 2006–07, Carlisle become the first visiting team to win a League One match at the Keepmoat Stadium, the new home of Doncaster Rovers, after a 2–1 win on 3 February 2007. The win was part of a sequence of games in which the club staged a late run for a play-off place; they finished the season in 8th place, their highest league finish for 22 years. Average league crowds were the highest for 30 years.

Neil McDonald was sacked one game into the 2007–08 season. Greg Abbott took over as caretaker manager with Cheltenham Town manager John Ward taking over on a permanent basis in October 2007. Ward's contract will run for four years.

Ward took Carlisle to the top of League One on 28 October, and they still looked likely for automatic promotion at the beginning of April, but could only finish fourth. On 12 May 2007, Carlisle United played Leeds United in the League One Playoff first leg at Elland Road. Carlisle won that match 2–1 with Graham and Marc Bridge-Wilkinson scoring the goals. Dougie Freedman scored a controversial injury time goal in the 96th minute for Leeds to set up a second leg.

In the corresponding fixture at Brunton Park, Leeds took an early first-half lead through a Jonny Howson goal, and Howson then scored a second with only seconds to spare to put the match at 3–2 on aggregate to Leeds, meaning Carlisle would spend another season in the third tier of English football.

The 2008–09 season began with the sale of two key players for a combined total of £1.5 million. On 18 June 2008, Keiren Westwood left for Coventry City, for an initial £500,000, while Joe Garner left for Nottingham Forest for £1.14 million, triggering a clause that made Carlisle sell him. On 3 July, a consortium of local businessmen, led by director and accountant David Allen completed a takeover of the club from Fred Story. Carlisle's start to the season was one of their best, maintaining an unbeaten run in the league throughout August. However, this was followed by one of the poorest runs in form of recent Carlisle United history. On 3 November, Carlisle announced that they had parted with John Ward "by mutual consent", and Greg Abbott became the caretaker manager of the club. Greg Abbott was announced as the permanent manager of Carlisle, after his performance in a 6-game stint as temporary manager and his low wage demands impressed the board enough to appoint him. Carlisle secured their place in League One after beating Millwall 2–0 on 2 May and Northampton Town were relegated to League Two.

In November 2009, the Blues reached the third round of the FA Cup for the first time in nine years, after a 3–1 win over Norwich City in a foggy evening fixture at Brunton Park, before losing 3–1 to Everton on 3 January 2010 in the third round at Goodison Park.

On 9 February 2010, Carlisle defeated Leeds United in the Johnstone's Paint Trophy Northern Final, winning 6–5 on penalties after the match finished 4–4 on aggregate over two legs, with Leeds winning the second leg 2–3 at Brunton Park. Carlisle thus became the first club to reach the final of this competition five times. On 28 March 2010, Carlisle played Southampton at the new Wembley Stadium in the Johnstone's Paint Trophy Final, where they succumbed to a 4–1 defeat in front of 73,746 fans. There was however some consolation when substitute Gary Madine grabbed a goal in the 84th minute with a fine header. Carlisle began the 2010–11 season strongly, with new acquisitions James Berrett, Frank Simek and the popular Francois Zoko boosting a team who had lost their star defender, ex-Leeds United full-back Ian Harte to Reading. Centre forward Gary Madine had begun to prove his worth, immediately forming a strong partnership with Zoko. However, the honeymoon period was not to continue and several slumps in form saw the club drop to within just four points of the relegation zone. Their luck was to change, with strong runs in the Johnsons Paint Trophy and the return of captain Paul Thirwell boosting a Carlisle team lacking in penetration. In April 2011, Carlisle won the 2011 Football League Trophy after a 1–0 win against Brentford.

The following season started successfully for the Cumbrians with Rory Loy, Lee Miller and Zoko all forming a hugely successful strike-partnership. They sustained a considerable play-off push throughout the season. Having occupied 6th place (final play-off position) for a period of the season, a dip in form towards the end of the seasons saw The Cumbrians miss out by just two points to Stevenage, meaning a successful seasons for the Cumbrians couldn't be rounded off with an appearance in the League One play-offs.

The following season began in disappointing manner. Following a number of heavy defeats the club found themselves drafted into a relegation battle, occupying the final relegation spot for a period of the season. However, a resurgence of form in the New Year following the return of target man Lee Miller, and fellow front-man Rory Loy saw Carlisle string together a number of good results to claw themselves clear of the relegation zone, eventually finishing the season in 17th position. The club retained Greg Abbott as manager, offering a 1-year extension to his current deal, whilst also extending assistant Graham Kavanagh's contract for another season.

The 2013–14 season started in disastrous style, with a 5–1 home defeat against Leyton Orient in which striker Lee Miller was sent off for violent conduct. A 4–0 drubbing away at Bradford City followed, before another 4–0 defeat at the hands of Coventry at home, before scraping points against Colchester and Brentford. Another heavy defeat in the League Cup followed as Championship side Leicester City secured a 5–2 victory at Brunton Park, before a narrow 1–0 home defeat to Port Vale spelled the end of Abbott's 5-year reign as United manager, just 2 points from 6 games had been the final straw for the club's Board.

Following Abbott's sacking, assistant manager Graham Kavanagh was installed as caretaker manager, appointed on a permanent basis on 30 September 2013, signing a two-year contract. Following three-straight League Wins under Kavanagh and some much improved performances, Kavanagh was installed as permanent boss on a two-year deal. In May 2014, Carlisle were relegated, ending an 8-year spell in the third tier having finished 22nd following a disastrous run of results under Kavanagh, meaning the club would compete in League Two for the 2014–15 league season. Kavanagh removed assistant manager Davie Irons from his post as assistant manager early in pre-season as work to overhaul the playing, and backroom staff was underway in Kavanagh's project to turn Carlisle into a top footballing side.

Graham Kavanagh was sacked in September 2014, following a winless start to the season, a 5–0 away defeat to newly promoted Cambridge United proved to be the final straw; alongside a record run of 15 league matches without a win for the club, ultimately culminating in Kavanagh being removed from his role as manager. He left the club having one of the worst records of any manager in the club's history, with a win ratio of only 25% and a relegation under his name. In September 2014, Keith Curle was appointed as Carlisle United manager, along with his former assistant Colin West. They signed a deal until the end of the 2015–16 season.

Curle got off to a flying start, winning his first full-match as manager 1–0 against fellow strugglers Tranmere Rovers. This was followed by a 3–0 victory over rivals Hartlepool United, and another home 3–0 victory against Stevenage. The run of form lifted Carlisle from the foot of the table, and out of the relegation zone. The surge in form soon petered out however, and United again found themselves near the trapdoor of the Football League's basement division. 7 points from 3 games towards the back end of the season meant that Carlisle secured their Football League safety with 2 games to spare, following a 2–0 home victory over promotion-chasing Plymouth Argyle, just 4 days after a courageous 1–1 draw away at Burton Albion. The next season was a much better one but not enough for a promotion push, with the team finishing 10th. A highlight of the season was a visit at Anfield for the third round of the League Cup and a famous 1–1 draw against giants Liverpool, but lost 3–2 on penalties.

The first half of the 2016–17 season was excellent for the club, with just one loss (against then-bottom Newport County) in their first 23 league fixtures. The play-offs seemed almost guaranteed. However a disastrous sequence followed, with only 4 wins in the next 21 games including 10 losses resulting in a drop from 2nd to 10th with only two games remaining. But a comeback home win against Newport County combined with favourable results elsewhere were enough to put them back into the play-off positions. Then, another comeback at play-off bound Exeter City in the last game proved enough for a final position of 6th, and a play-off semi-final showdown with the same opponent. However, Exeter beat them 6–5 on aggregate to condemn Carlisle to another season in League Two.

Keith Curle left Carlisle United at the end of the 2017–18 League Two season after over four years in charge. He was replaced by John Sheridan. In January 2019, John Sheridan resigned as the Carlisle manager in order to become manager of National League side Chesterfield with the club in the last play-off position. Sheridan was replaced by Steven Pressley who saw the Cumbrians finish the 2018–19 season in 11th place.

In November 2019, Pressley was sacked with the Cumbrians in 19th place. Pressley was replaced by Chris Beech. The 2019–20 season was cancelled due to the COVID-19 pandemic with the Cumbrians in a disappointing 18th place. Chris Beech then set about the task of re-building the squad following the disappointing 18th-placed finish, bringing in a raft of new signings and developing a new football system. The 2020–21 season started in positive fashion for the blues with the club sitting top of the table at Christmas, resulting in Beech signing a new contract extension. However, a poor run of form saw the side slip from top to 14th in the table, nevertheless, results picked up towards the end of the season seeing the Cumbrians finish in 10th place.

The 2020–21 close season saw a number of first team regulars depart the blues including club captain Nick Anderton, goalkeeper Paul Farman and winger Omari Patrick. Beech set about again rebuilding his squad for the 2021–22 season to try and mount a further promotion push. In October 2021, manager Chris Beech was sacked due to a poor run of form for Carlisle and replaced by Keith Millen. However, Millen could not turn the blues' season around and after a 3–0 defeat at home by Swindon Town and a run of bad results Keith Millen was sacked in February 2022. Paul Simpson was announced as the new manager the same day. "Simmo" led the blues to 8 wins, 1 draw and 6 defeats which was enough to pull the club from the relegation zone and keep Carlisle in the football league finishing 20th place.

After securing survival in the 2021–22 season, Simpson agreed terms on a new three-year contract as manager. In the 2022–23 season, Carlisle finished 5th, securing a play-off spot. In the play-off semi-final, Carlisle defeated Bradford City to win the tie 3–2 on aggregate. In the play-off final, the Cumbrians defeated Stockport County on penalties after a 1–1 draw to earn promotion back to League One after nine years in League Two.
