= Jack Robinson (footballer, born 2001) =

English footballer (born 2001)

Personal information
- Full name: Jack Robinson
- Date of birth: 21 June 2001 (age 25)
- Place of birth: Middlesbrough, England
- Position: Defender

Team information
- Current team: Gateshead
- Number: 6

Youth career
- Nunthorpe Athletic
- –2021: Middlesbrough

Senior career*
Years	Team	Apps	(Gls)
2021–2023	Middlesbrough	1	(0)
2021–2022	→ Yeovil Town (loan)	17	(0)
2023	→ Carlisle United (loan)	8	(0)
2023–2025	Carlisle United	26	(0)
2025	Hartlepool United	3	(0)
2026–	Gateshead	8	(0)
- * Club domestic league appearances and goals as of 16:28, 10 August 2026 (UTC)

Jack Robinson (born 21 June 2001) is an English professional footballer who plays as a defender for Gateshead.

== Career ==
After playing youth football for Nunthorpe Athletic, he joined Middlesbrough's academy at the age of 13. He signed his first professional contract with the club in summer 2020. He made his debut for the club on 8 May 2021 as a substitute in a 3–0 Championship defeat to Wycombe Wanderers.

On 28 August 2021, Robinson signed for National League side Yeovil Town on loan until 10 January 2022. On 13 January 2022, the loan was extended for the remainder of the 2021–22 season.

On 3 January 2023, Robinson joined EFL League Two side Carlisle United on loan for the remainder of the 2022–23 season. He was an unused substitute in the 2023 League Two play-off final victory over Stockport County at Wembley Stadium. Following promotion at the end of the season, he returned to the club on a permanent two-year deal. On 3 February 2025, Robinson departed Carlisle having made 41 appearances in total for the club. He made six appearances during the 2024–25 season for Carlisle.

On 5 February 2025, Robinson signed for National League club Hartlepool United. At the end of the 2024–25 season, it was announced that he would be released by Hartlepool at the end of his contract.

After injury kept Robinson out of the 2025–26 season, he signed for Gateshead on 22 July 2026.

== Style of play ==
Robinson can play as a centre back or as a left back.

== Career statistics ==
As of match played 1 March 2025

Appearances and goals by club, season and competition
Club	Season	League			FA Cup		League Cup		Other		Total	
Club	Season	Division	Apps	Goals	Apps	Goals	Apps	Goals	Apps	Goals	Apps	Goals
Middlesbrough U23	2018–19	—			—		—		2 (Note: Appearances in EFL Trophy)	0	2	0
Middlesbrough	2020–21	Championship	1	0	0	0	0	0	—		1	0
Middlesbrough	2021–22	Championship	0	0	0	0	1	0	—		1	0
Middlesbrough	2022–23	Championship	0	0	0	0	0	0	0	0	0	0
Middlesbrough	Total		1	0	0	0	1	0	0	0	2	0
Yeovil Town (loan)	2021–22	National League	17	0	3	1	—		3 (Note: One appearance in FA Trophy, two appearances in Somerset Premier Cup)	0	23	1
Carlisle United (loan)	2022–23	League Two	7	0	0	0	0	0	1 (Note: Appearance in League Two play-offs)	0	8	0
Carlisle United	2023–24	League One	23	0	1	0	1	0	2	0	27	0
Carlisle United	2024–25	League Two	3	0	1	0	0	0	2	0	6	0
Carlisle United	Total		26	0	2	0	1	0	4	0	33	0
Hartlepool United	2024–25	National League	3	0	—		—		—		3	0
Gateshead	2026–27	National League	8	0	0	0	—		0	0	1	0
Career total			63	0	5	1	2	0	10	0	81	1

== Honours ==
Carlisle United

- EFL League Two play-offs: 2023
