= Jack Ellis (footballer, born 2003) =

English footballer (born 2003)

Personal information
- Full name: Jack Ethan James Ellis
- Date of birth: 24 October 2003 (age 23)
- Place of birth: Kendal, England
- Height: 1.87 m (6 ft 2 in)
- Position: Defender

Team information
- Current team: Carlisle United
- Number: 18

Youth career
- –2022: Carlisle United

Senior career*
Years	Team	Apps	(Gls)
2022–	Carlisle United	94	(3)
- * Club domestic league appearances and goals as of 13:32, 7 June 2026 (UTC)

Jack Ethan James Ellis (born 24 October 2003) is an English professional footballer who plays as a defender for National League club Carlisle United.

== Career ==
Ellis turned professional at Carlisle United in January 2022, having already captained the under-18 team. Manager Keith Millen said that Ellis found youth football "too easy" as he had "developed very quickly in the last four months". He made EFL League Two debut for the club on 30 April 2022, in a 2–1 win over Stevenage at Brunton Park, in what was Carlisle's last home game of the 2021–22 season. Speaking in October 2022, new manager Paul Simpson said that Ellis had asked about leaving the club on loan, but had applied himself in training and performed well upon being returned to the starting eleven. On 21 November 2025 Ellis agreed to a new one year contract, with the option of another year

== Style of play ==
Carlisle United manager said that Ellis is a player who provided "balance with his left foot, a desire to close people down [and] competed for headers".

== Career statistics ==
As of match played 3 May 2025

Appearances and goals by club, season and competition
Club	Season	League			FA Cup		EFL Cup		Other		Total	
Club	Season	Division	Apps	Goals	Apps	Goals	Apps	Goals	Apps	Goals	Apps	Goals
Carlisle United	2021–22	League Two	2	0	0	0	0	0	0	0	2	0
Carlisle United	2022–23	League Two	12	0	2	0	0	0	3 (Note: Appearances in EFL Trophy)	0	17	0
Carlisle United	2023–24	League One	16	0	0	0	1	0	2	0	19	0
Carlisle United	2024–25	League Two	21	1	1	0	1	0	3	0	26	1
Total			51	1	3	0	2	0	8	0	64	1
Career total			51	1	3	0	2	0	8	0	64	1
