= 2011–12 Stockport County F.C. season =

Stockport County F.C.
2011–12 season
- Chairman: Lord Peter Snape
- Manager: Ray Mathias (25 May 2011 – 3 July 2011); Dietmar Hamann (3 July 2011 – 7 November 2011); Willie McStay (Caretaker Manager) (7 November – 14 November); Jim Gannon (Director of football) (14 November – )
- Stadium: Edgeley Park
- Conference National: 16th
- FA Cup: 4th qualifying round
- FA Trophy: 1st round
- Top goalscorer: League: Danny L. Rowe (8); All: Tom Elliott (8) – 7 League, 1 Cup
- Highest home attendance: 6, 393 vs Tamworth (21 April 2012)
- Lowest home attendance: 2,366 v Gateshead (11 October 2011)
- Average home league attendance: 3,676
Home colours	Away colours	Third colours

The 2011–12 season was Stockport County's 130th season in football, and the first outside of the Football League in 106 years, after finishing bottom of League Two in 2010–11. They competed in the Conference National. This season ran from 12 August 2011 until 28 April 2012.

In May, Ray Mathias, who had been appointed caretaker manager the previous season, was given the role full-time. However, following proposed investment in the club Dietmar Hamann was appointed as first team manager in July. Hamman stepped down from this post on 7 November 2011. Hamann was replaced with his assistant Willie McStay who took caretaker charge until Jim Gannon was appointed director of football at the club.

== Background ==
This is a list of the significant events to occur at the club during the 2011–12 season, presented in chronological order. This list does not include transfers, which are listed in the transfers section below, or match results, which are in the results section.

In 2010–11 Stockport were relegated from the Football League, finishing bottom of League Two. They started 2010–11 with Paul Simpson as manager but he was sacked mid-season. The 2011–12 season marks Stockport County's first season outside the Football League since 1904–05, and their first in the Football Conference. They will also compete in the FA Trophy for the first time in their history. Stockport's opening league game in Non-League football was against Forest Green Rovers, a match that was moved to 12 August (a Friday) so it could be televised by Premier Sports, the Conference' television partner. Three other games were moved for television – the home fixture against Luton Town and away games at Cambridge United and Fleetwood Town.

In July, Stockport looked set to receive new investment from a consortium named Sports Investment Management Limited (SIML), headed by Liverpool-based businessman Tony Evans, who was appointed a director to the club board. However, in September the deal failed to go through following a disagreement between the club's shareholders and SIML over the responsibility of paying bills. Evans' failure to disclose the identity of other members of the consortium was also cited as a stumbling block to the deal.

On 31 October, Stockport moved their away match against Ebbsfleet United (Which would have been played 6 March 2012) to 12 November 2011. This was done due to the fact that both teams were no longer participating in this seasons FA Cup after being knocked out in 4th round qualifying. Dietmar Hamann's assistant Willie McStay took charge of Stockport for this match, due to Hamann stepping down as manager earlier in the week. This made McStay Stockport's fifth manager in three years. Two months after his resignation Hamman cited the failure of a proposed takeover by businessman Tony Evans as his reason for leaving the club.

On 14 November Stockport announced that Jim Gannon would return to the club to become director of football. He would be assisted by the then caretaker manager Willie McStay. Gannon stated that the club are in a worse state now then they were when he left.

On 17 November Stockport announced that their away match against Luton Town was postponed due to Luton's participation in the FA Cup. The game that was meant to be played on Saturday 3 December 2011 will now be played on Tuesday 10 January 2012. On 13 January 2012 Stockport announced that their last match of the season, a game away to Hayes & Yeading United) had been brought forward from a 3pm kick off to a 1pm kick off. This was done to enable Premier Sports to broadcast the live game. On 16 January Stockport announced that the game against Alfreton Town which was supposed to be played on Saturday, 4 February 2012 was postponed due to Alfreton Town's participation in the third round of the FA Trophy. The following day Stockport announced that this game will now be played on 14 February 2012. On 7 February Stockport announced the Alfreton Town match was postponed for a second time as Alfreton's FA Trophy match versus Gateshead was postponed and would be played on 14 February 2012. The rearranged match will now be played on Tuesday 6 March.

On 17 January 2012, the club announced that Spencer Fearn was to be appointed a Director at the club.

On 7 February, the Manchester Evening News reported that Stockport were to receive a £180,000 loan from the town's council., Later in the day chairman of the club, Lord Peter Snape spoke out via the club website about the council loan. He claimed that the story published in the Manchester Evening News was "an inaccurate and sensationalised report ". Stockport's financial troubles were further helped when; with the help of Sale Sharks owner Brian Kennedy, Stockport do not have to pay rent to play at Edgeley Park for the next few months.

Sale Sharks confirmed that they would be leaving Edgeley Park at the end of the season. This meant that Stockport County once again could generate revenue streams via the club and the ground.

Stockport finished their first season outside of the Football League, in 16th position

== Summary ==
=== Results summary ===
Overall								Home						Away					
Pld	W	D	L	GF	GA	GD	Pts	W	D	L	GF	GA	GD	W	D	L	GF	GA	GD
46	12	15	19	58	74	−16	51	8	7	8	35	28	+7	4	8	11	23	46	−23

Last updated: 28 April 2012..

==== Results by round ====
Round	1	2	3	4	5	6	7	8	9	10	11	12	13	14	15	16	17	18	19	20	21	22	23	24	25	26	27	28	29	30	31	32	33	34	35	36	37	38	39	40	41	42	43	44	45	46
Ground	A	H	H	A	A	H	H	A	H	A	A	H	H	A	H	A	A	H	H	A	A	H	A	H	H	A	H	A	A	A	H	H	H	A	H	A	A	H	A	H	A	H	A	H	H	A
Result	D	W	D	D	D	L	D	D	W	D	D	L	L	D	L	L	W	L	D	L	L	L	L	L	D	L	W	L	L	D	D	W	D	L	W	W	L	L	L	W	W	W	L	D	W	W
Position	1	5	8	9	8	15	11	16	13	14	14	15	17	17	18	20	17	18	17	17	18	20	21	22	22	23	19	19	19	19	19	19	18	19	19	16	16	16	18	18	19	17	18	18	16	16

Updated to match(es) played on 28 April 2012. Source: statto.com, football-lineups.com
A = Away; H = Home; W = Win; D = Draw; L = Loss

==== Conference Premier table ====
Pos	Team	Pld	W	D	L	GF	GA	GD	Pts
14	Ebbsfleet United	46	14	12	20	69	84	−15	54
15	Alfreton Town	46	15	9	22	62	86	−24	54
16	Stockport County	46	12	15	19	58	74	−16	51
17	Lincoln City	46	13	10	23	56	66	−10	49
18	Tamworth	46	11	15	20	47	70	−23	48

Source: Football Conference
Rules for classification: 1) points; 2) goal difference; 3) number of goals scored.

== Statistics ==
=== Goalscorers ===
No.	Flag	Pos	Name	League	FA Cup	FA Trophy	Total
20	(England)	FW	Tom Elliott	7	0	1	8
6	(England)	FW	Danny L. Rowe	8	0	0	8
19	(England)	FW	Nick Chadwick	7	0	0	7
10	(England)	FW	Danny Hattersley	6	0	0	6
7	(England)	MF	Sean McConville	4	0	2	6
22	(England)	DF	Carl Piergianni	4	0	0	4
23	(Scotland)	FW	Michael Paton	4	0	0	4
32	(England)	MF	Joe Connor	3	0	0	3
6	(England)	FW	Antonio German	3	0	0	3
14	(Republic of Ireland)	MF	Sam Sheridan	2	0	0	2
13	(England)	FW	Cameron Darkwah	2	0	0	2
2	(England)	DF	Jordan Rose	2	0	0	2
5	(England)	DF	Danny O'Donnell	2	0	0	2
3	(United States)	DF	Euan Holden	1	0	0	1
15	(England)	FW	Danny Whitehead	1	0	0	1
16	(England)	FW	Sean Newton	1	0	0	1
			Own Goals	1	0	0	1

Last updated: 28 April 2012..

==== Penalties Awarded ====
Date	Success?	Penalty Taker	Opponent	Competition	Notes
12 November 2011	✓	(England) Nick Chadwick	Ebbsfleet United	Conference National	
19 November 2011	✓	(England) Sean McConville	Fleetwood Town	Conference National	
10 December 2011	✗	(England) Sean McConville	Stalybridge Celtic	FA Trophy	
1 January 2012	✓	(Republic of Ireland) Sam Sheridan	Barrow	Conference National	
3 March 2012	✓	(England) Danny L. Rowe	Darlington	Conference National	
10 March 2012	✗	(England) Danny L. Rowe	Cambridge United	Conference National	

=== Assists ===
No.	Flag	Pos	Name	League	FA Cup	FA Trophy	Total
7	(England)	MF	Sean McConville	5	0	0	5
20	(England)	FW	Tom Elliott	5	0	0	5
3	(United States)	DF	Euan Holden	4	0	0	4
18	(England)	MF	Danny M. Rowe	2	0	2	4
14	(Republic of Ireland)	FW	Sam Sheridan	4	0	0	4
6	(England)	MF	Danny L. Rowe	3	0	0	3
10	(England)	FW	John Miles	2	0	0	2
23	(Scotland)	FW	Michael Paton	2	0	0	2
24	(England)	DF	Joe Edwards	1	0	1	2
5	(England)	DF	Danny O'Donnell	2	0	0	2
29	(England)	MF	Aaron Cole	2	0	0	2
16	(England)	FW	Sean Newton	2	0	0	2
8	(England)	MF	Jon Nolan	2	0	0	2
15	(England)	FW	Danny Whitehead	2	0	0	2
18	(England)	DF	Andy Halls	2	0	0	2
11	(England)	FW	Ryan Fraughan	1	0	0	1
19	(England)	FW	Nick Chadwick	1	0	0	1
32	(England)	MF	Joe Connor	1	0	0	1
10	(England)	FW	Danny Hattersley	1	0	0	1
22	(England)	DF	Carl Piergianni	1	0	0	1
19	(England)	MF	Matty Mainwaring	1	0	0	1

Last updated: 28 April 2012..

=== Disciplinary record ===
Note: Cards from all competitions are included.

Number	Nation	Position	Name	Total	
Number	Nation	Position	Name	Yellow card	Red card
22	(England)	DF	Carl Piergianni	7	1
20	(England)	FW	Tom Elliott	5	0
7	(England)	MF	Sean McConville	3	0
14	(Republic of Ireland)	MF	Sam Sheridan	3	0
17	(England)	DF	Andy Halls	3	0
8	(England)	MF	Jon Nolan	3	0
16	(Scotland)	DF	Ryan McCann	2	0
23	(Scotland)	DF	Michael Paton	2	0
4	(England)	MF	Jon Routledge	2	0
21	(France)	FW	Nabil Bounab	2	0
5	(England)	DF	Danny O'Donnell	2	0
25	(England)	DF	Chris Blackburn	2	0
32	(England)	MF	Joe Connor	2	0
12	(England)	GK	Ian Ormson	1	1
24	(England)	DF	Joe Edwards	1	0
6	(England)	DF	Danny Hall	1	0
19	(England)	FW	Nick Chadwick	1	0
15	(England)	FW	Danny Whitehead	1	0
3	(United States)	DF	Euan Holden	1	0
6	(England)	FW	Antonio German	1	0
9	(Scotland)	FW	Martin Gritton	1	0
18	(England)	MF	Danny M. Rowe	1	0
32	(England)	MF	Joe Connor	1	0
2	(England)	DF	Jordan Rose	1	0
10	(England)	FW	Danny Hattersley	1	0
16	(England)	FW	Sean Newton	1	0
			Totals	49	2

Last updated: 28 April 2012..

=== Player Awards ===
Date	Player	Award	Notes
15 August 2011	(England) Ryan Fraughan	The Non-League Paper Team of the Day	
23 August 2011	(United States) Euan Holden	The Non-League Paper Team of the Day	
5 September 2011	(England) Sean McConville	The Non-League Paper Team of the Day	
19 September 2011	(England) Antonio German	The Non-League Paper Team of the Day	
19 December 2011	(England) Joe Connor	The Non-League Paper Team of the Day	
29 January 2012	(England) Danny L. Rowe	The Non-League Paper Team of the Day	
3 March 2012	(England) Danny M. Rowe	The Non-League Paper Team of the Day	
26 March 2012	(England) Tom Elliott	The Non-League Paper Team of the Day	
2 April 2012	(England) Sean Newton	The Non-League Paper Team of the Day	
16 April 2012	(England) Carl Piergianni	The Non-League Paper Team of the Day	
5 May 2012	(England) Joe Connor	Player of the Year	
5 May 2012	(England) Ian Ormson	Young Player of the Year	
5 May 2012	(England) Sam Sheridan	Goal of the season	
5 May 2012	(England) Andy Halls	Community Player Of The Season	

=== Manager Awards ===
Date	Manager	Award	Notes
3 March 2012	(Republic of Ireland) Jim Gannon	The Non-League Paper Team of the Day	

=== Overall Statistics ===
Statistic	Total	League	FA Cup	FA Trophy
Games played	49	46	1	2
Games won	12	12	0	0
Games drawn	16	15	0	1
Games lost	23	21	1	1
Goals scored	61	58	0	3
Goals conceded	79	74	1	4
Goal difference	−18	−16	−1	−1
Clean sheets	9	9	0	0
Yellow cards	49	47	1	1
Red cards	2	2	0	0
Biggest win	Stockport 4–0 Bath City, Conference National, 24 March 2012. Stockport 4–0 Lincoln City, Conference National, 7 April 2012.			
Biggest defeat	Grimsby Town 7–0 Stockport, Conference National, 29 November 2011.			
Most appearances	(England) Tom Elliott — 44 (35 starts, 9 substitute)			
League Top scorer	(England) Tom Elliott — 8 (England) Danny L. Rowe — 8			
Top assists	(England) Sean McConville — 5 (England) Tom Elliott — 5			
Worst discipline	(England) Carl Piergianni — 7 (yellow card) 1 (red card) (England) Tom Elliott — 5 (yellow card) 0 (red card)			

Last updated: 24 April 2012.
Source: Competitions' Wikipedia articles.

== Review ==
=== Pre-season ===
Friendlies with Stalybridge Celtic, Woodley Sports and Mossley were originally planned to take place in July 2011 but were cancelled due to squad size as there would not have been enough players to complete in the fixtures. A friendly at Chester was also scheduled to be played but was replaced by a friendly against Accrington Stanley at Edgeley Park. The friendly with Bolton Wanderers was classed as the first Manchester Senior Cup tie for both teams.

Stockport began pre-season with a draw against New Mills, the Hatters' goal coming in the second half scored by trialist Leighton McGivern. Stockport fielded two separate XIs in either half. This was followed up by a 1–0 defeat away to Vauxhall Motors, then a 2–0 win away to Buxton with the goals coming in the second half from Sean McConville and new signing Martin Gritton. County earned a second successive win of the summer with a 1–0 win against Accrington Stanley, Sean McConville scoring against his former club from the penalty spot. County lost their next game against Bolton in the Manchester Senior Cup 3–2, Stockport's goals coming from Danny Rowe and Martin Gritton. County finished pre-season with a 2–0 win at Altrincham, with the first goal scored by trialist Tom Elliot and the second scored by John Miles.

=== August ===
Stockport started the season with a 1–1 draw away to Forest Green Rovers, in a game which was shown live on Premier Sports, Stockport fell behind to a goal from Reece Styche before Nick Chadwick headed an equaliser for Stockport on seventy-eight minutes. After the game it was announced that Ryan Fraughan was named as part of the Non-League Paper's team of the day. On 16 August Stockport secured their first win of the season beating Kettering Town 1–0 at home, with the goal coming Euan Holden. The scores stayed that way even after Sol Davis was sent off for Kettering. Stockport were denied a second successive home win, as they drew 1–1 at home to Ebbsfleet United four days later, the goal coming from Nick Chadwick with a far post header before Ebbsfleet equalised eight minutes later. After the game it was announced that Euan Holden was named as part of the Non-League Paper's team of the day. On 23 August, Stockport drew their second successive game against Kidderminster Harriers, Stockport's goal coming from Tom Elliot in the first-half, before Kidderminster equalised late on in the second-half. On 26 August, Stockport drew their third consecutive match, drawing 1–1 to Lincoln City, Alan Power opened the scoring for Lincoln before Tom Elliott equalised for Stockport just before half-time. On 29 August Stockport's five match unbeaten run came to an end as they lost their first game of the season 1–0 to Mansfield Town, the goal of the game coming from Luke O'Neill in the second half.

Because of decent showings for Stockport Sean McConville, Ryan Fraughan and Carl Piergianni were called up to the England C team to play India Under 23's. The game was called off when India cancelled there UK tour.

=== September ===
Chris Blackburn made his debut against Luton Town

Stockport Started September with a Home game against Luton Town which was Stockport's second match of the season to be aired live on Premier Sports. The game finished 1–1, Stockport fell behind after five minutes with a goal from Alex Lawless, the equaliser came from winger Sean McConville in the second minute of second half stoppage time. During the game midfielder Jon Routledge fractured his cheekbone in a clash with Luton Town defender Curtis Osano. After the game it was announced that Sean McConville was named in the Non-League Paper's team of the day. On 10 September Stockport drew their sixth game of the season, away to Telford United. Sean Newton opened the scoring for the home side from the penalty spot. Antonio German equalised for Stockport two minutes later. On 17 September, Stockport won their second game of the season (And the first game where they scored more than 1 goal), by beating Grimsby Town 2–0, goals from Sean McConville and Tom Elliott respectively sealed the win for Stockport. After the game Antonio German was announced as being a part of the Non-League Paper's Team of the Day. On 20 September Stockport drew their seventh match of the season 1–1, away to Newport County. Newport took the lead with a goal from Danny Rose, however Stockport equalised with a goal from Tom Elliott. On 24 September Stockport drew their eighth game of the season against Tamworth. Stockport opened the scoring just after half time with Sean McConville shot deflecting off Nick Chadwick into the net. Tamworth equalised in second half stoppage time with a shot from Iyseden Christie. During the second half Stockport's Sean McConville was stretchered off with a clavicle (collarbone) injury. On 27 September Stockport lost their second home game of the season 4–2 against Fleetwood Town. Stockport's goals came from Antonio German who scored in both halves, Fleetwood had four different scorers.

=== October ===
Stockport started October with a home game against York City, which ended 2–1 to York, goals coming from Matty Blair and Jason Walker. Stockport grabbed a consolation goal in second half stoppage time when Michael Paton headed his first goal for the club. On 6 October Stockport drew their ninth match of the season drawing 2–2 against Cambridge United in a match which was aired live on Premier Sports. Stockport twice took the lead with goals from Nick Chadwick and Danny Whitehead with Cambridge's equalisers coming from Luke Berry and Jordan Patrick. Carl Piergianni was also sent off for Stockport for a second bookable offence. On 11 October, they lost their third consecutive home match, beaten 4–3 by Darlington. Stockport went behind in the first minute, but a minute later they equalised with a goal from Nick Chadwick. Stockport then took the lead ten minutes later through Michael Paton, but Darlington levelled the match again with a goal just before half time. In the second half Stockport took the lead, with a second goal from Michael Paton but Darlington once again equalised when Jamie Chandler scored his second of the game. Darlington scored the winner in the 85th minute. On 15 October, Stockport lost their first away match of the season when they were beaten 4–0 by table toppers Wrexham, their goals coming from Andy Morrell, Jake Speight and two from Nathaniel Knight-Percival. On 18 October Stockport won their first away game of the season by beating Bath City 2–0. Nick Chadwick and Michael Paton scoring for Stockport in the second half. On 22 October, Stockport were beaten 1–0 at home by Forest Green Rovers.The scorer for Forest Green Rovers was Yan Klukowski. October finished with a defeat when they failed to qualify for this season's FA Cup first round, losing 1–0 away to Southport in the fourth qualifying round.

=== November ===
Stockport began November with a 3–3 draw at home to Hayes & Yeading. Stockport's scorers were Tom Elliott and Carl Piergianni the latter of which scored two. This was to be Dietmar Hamann's last game in charge of Stockport County, after being heavily booed by their supporters due to the draw with Hayes & Yeading. Willie McStay took caretaker charge of Stockport for the next game which they lost 2–1 against Ebbsfleet United. The scorer for Stockport was Nick Chadwick from the penalty spot, with Calum Willock and Nathaniel Pinney scoring for Ebbsfleet. In Jim Gannon's first match back in charge of Stockport, They lost 2–1 away to Fleetwood Town in a match which was aired live on Premier Sports. The scorer for Stockport was Sean McConville from the penalty spot, with Andy Mangan and Jamie Vardy scoring for the hosts. On 26 November Stockport lost their third match in a row when they lost 1–0 at home to Southport who played most of the match with 10 men. Three days later, Stockport lost a fourth successive game when they were beaten 7–0 away at Grimsby Town, former Stockport player Anthony Elding scored for the home side, as well as Liam Hearn scoring his third hat trick of the season for Grimsby. Jim Gannon admitted he was not proud to be manager of Stockport County after this defeat.

=== December ===
Stockport lost 1–0 at home to Gateshead a week later. The goal for Gateshead was scored by Jon Shaw. On 10 December Stockport played their first ever game in the FA Trophy and drew 2–2 at home to Conference North side Stalybridge Celtic. The goals came from Tom Elliott and Sean McConville, the latter of whom also missed a penalty. Connor Jennings scored twice for the visitors while Rhys Meynell was sent off. Three days later Stockport were beaten 2–1 in the replay at Bower Fold. The Stockport goal came from Sean McConville, Gregg Wilkinson equalised for the home side before Connor Jennings won it for Stalybridge in the 89th minute. Stockport secured their first point since the beginning of November, in a goalless draw with Alfreton Town on 17 December 2011. After the game it was announced that Joe Connor was named as part of the Non-League Paper's team of the day. On Boxing Day, Stockport lost 1–0 away to Barrow with the goal coming from Phil Bolland.

=== January ===
On 1 January 2012, Stockport won for the first time in thirteen matches — their first at home since September, with a 3–2 win over Barrow. Sam Sheridan scored twice for Stockport, one of which was a late penalty, Joe Connor scored the other.

"I didn't feel any pressure taking crucial penalty in the Barrow game"

— Sam Sheridan,

On 7 January, they were beaten 2–0 away from home to Gateshead. Jon Shaw and Chris Moore scoring the goals for the home side. Three days later, Stockport lost their second game in row when they were beaten 1–0 at Luton Town, they conceded their third penalty in as many games which was converted by Aaron O'Connor. A week after the game with Stockport not playing director of football Jim Gannon decided to say that he is optimistic about the club's future. On 21 January Stockport drew 2–2 away to Braintree Town. They had to come back from two goals down after Aswad Thomas opened the scoring on 58 minutes. Nicky Symons doubled the lead on 61 minutes but Joe Connor and on loan Striker Danny L. Rowe both scored to earn Stockport a draw. On 24 January, Stockport earned their second 2–2 draw in three days when the played AFC Telford United. Telford took the lead on 16 minutes with a goal from Chris Sharp. 18 minutes later Telford doubled their lead with a goal from Steve Jones. In the second half Stockport got a goal back via a Danny O'Donnell header on 67 minutes. Carl Piergianni equalised for Stockport on 82 minutes. Phil Trainer was also sent off for Telford on 79 minutes for a second bookable offence. On 28 January Stockport won their fourth home game of the season with a 2–1 victory over Kidderminster Harriers. Goals for Stockport came from Sean McConville in the first half and Danny L. Rowe in the second. The Kidderminster goal scorer was Nick Wright. After the game it was announced that Danny L. Rowe was named as part of the Non-League Paper's team of the day.

=== February ===
On 2 February Stockport Announced that Sean McConville, Carl Piergianni and Ian Ormson had been named as part of the England C contingency squad for the forthcoming game against Italy in the International Challenge Trophy.

On 11 February Stockport stretched their unbeaten home run in the league to 5 games with a 2 – 2 draw against Newport County. Stockport's goals were both scored by Danny L. Rowe — The second of which was direct from a free kick. Andy Sandell pulled one back for Newport before being sent off eight minutes later. Jake Harris rescued a point for the visitors in the 86th minute. On 18 February Stockport lost 2–1 away at York City. Danny L. Rowe scored Stockport's only goal. Jamie Reed and Matthew Blinkhorn scored for York. On 25 February Stockport won 1–0 at home to Wrexham after Wrexham goalkeeper Joslain Mayebi put through his own net.Jay Harris was also sent-off for Wrexham. After the game both Danny M. Rowe (as a left back) and Jim Gannon (as manager) were named as part of the Non-League Paper's team of the day.

=== March ===
Stockport County players Carl Piergianni, Euan Holden and Danny M. Rowe warm up vs. Cambridge United

On 3 March 2012 Stockport won their second game in a row and achieved back to back wins for the first time in three years (153 matches in all competitions) when they beat Darlington 1–0 away from home. Danny L. Rowe scored Stockport's goal from the penalty spot after Rob Ramshaw was sent off for the home side. Stockport then lost 6–1 away to Alfreton Town.Nathan Jarman scored a hat-trick for Alfreton (of which two were penalties) while Jordan Rose headed home a Euan Holden cross to grab a consolation for Stockport. Stockport then lost a second consecutive game when they lost 1–0 at home to Cambridge United. Mustafa Tiryaki scored the only goal of the game for Cambridge. Stockport's Danny L. Rowe missed a penalty in the first half. On 17 March Stockport lost 5–0 away to Southport. Tony Gray opened the scoring in the first half Carl Piergianni scored an own goal to double the lead, Whalley then scored a brace before Gray scored his second the round off the scoring. Stockport's goalkeeper Ian Ormson was also sent off after 71 minutes. On 24 March Stockport beat bottom of the league Bath City 4–0. Danny Hattersley, Carl Piergianni and Tom Elliott (who scored two goals), were the goalscorers for Stockport. After the match it was announced that Tom Elliott was named as part of the Non-League Paper's team of the day. Stockport finished the month with back to back wins when they beat Kettering Town 3–1 away, at Nene Park. Danny Hattersley, Sean Newton and Cameron Darkwah were Stockport's goalscorers. . After the game it was announced that Sean Newton was named as part of the Non-League Paper's team of the day.

=== April ===
Stockport gained their third win in a row, another 4–0 home win, this time against Lincoln City Danny Hattersley, Cameron Darkwah and Danny L. Rowe, the latter of whom scored two, were the goalscorers for Stockport. Jordan Rose could have added a fifth for Stockport however his goal was ruled out by the final whistle. Two days later Stockport's Winning streak came to an end when they lost 2–1 away to Mansfield Town. Jordan Rose scored Stockport's consolation goal. Stockport's safety was confirmed five days later when they drew 1–1 at home to Braintree Town. Stockport's goal was scored by Danny Hattersley, Bradley Quinton equalised for the visitors in second half stoppage time. After the game it was announced that Carl Piergianni was named as part of the Non-League Paper's team of the day. On 21 April Stockport beat Tamworth 2–0 in their final home game of the season. Stockport's Goals were scored by Danny O'Donnell and Danny Hattersley in front of Stockport largest home crowd of the season. Stockport won their final game of the season 2–1 away to Hayes & Yeading. Stockport scored first with a goal from Danny Hattersley .Julian Owusu got a goal back for Hayes before Joe Connor got the winner for Stockport.

== Results ==
=== Legend ===
Win	Draw	Loss

=== Pre season friendlies ===
15 July 2011	New Mills	1–1	Stockport County	Church Lane, New Mills
19:30	Meakin 10'	Report	McGivern 53' ^{1}

19 July 2011	Vauxhall Motors	1–0	Stockport County	Rivacre Park, Ellesmere Port
19:30	Wilson 10' (pen.)	Report

23 July 2011	Buxton	0–2	Stockport County	The Silverlands, Buxton
15:00		Report	McConville 53'; Gritton 73'

30 July 2011	Stockport County	1–0	Accrington Stanley	Edgeley Park, Stockport
15:00	McConville 34' (pen.)	Report

2 August 2011	Stockport County	2–3	Bolton Wanderers	Edgeley Park, Stockport
19:45	Rowe 2'; Gritton 89'	Report	Sampson 48'; O'Halloran 60'; Blakeman 75'

6 August 2011	Altrincham	0–2	Stockport County	Moss Lane, Altrincham
15:00		Report	Elliott 2' ^{1} Miles 20'	Attendance: 1,084

^{1} The Player scored during their trial period at the club

=== Conference National ===
12 August 2011 1	Forest Green Rovers	1–1	Stockport County	The New Lawn, Nailsworth
19:45	Styche 21'	Report	Chadwick 78'	Attendance: 1,848; Referee: Rob Whitton

16 August 2011 2	Stockport County	1–0	Kettering Town	Edgeley Park, Stockport
19:45	Holden 60'	Report	Davis (red card) 65'	Attendance: 3,429; Referee: Jeremy Simpson

20 August 2011 3	Stockport County	1–1	Ebbsfleet United	Edgeley Park, Stockport
15:00	Chadwick 68'	Report	West 76'	Attendance: 3,674; Referee: Wayne Barrett

23 August 2011 4	Kidderminster Harriers	1 – 1	Stockport County	Aggborough, Kidderminster
19:45	Phelan 87'	Report	Elliott 26'	Attendance: 1,886; Referee: Andy Davies

26 August 2011 5	Lincoln City	1 – 1	Stockport County	Sincil Bank, Lincoln
15:00	Power 8'	Report	Elliott 44'	Attendance: 2,152; Referee: Stephen Martin

29 August 2011 6	Stockport County	0–1	Mansfield Town	Edgeley Park, Stockport
12:00		Report	O'Neill 67'	Attendance: 3,571; Referee: Peter Banks

2 September 2011 7	Stockport County	1–1	Luton Town	Edgeley Park, Stockport
19:45	McConville 90+2'	Report	Lawless 5'	Attendance: 3,389; Referee: Robert Merchant

10 September 2011 8	Telford United	1–1	Stockport County	New Bucks Head, Telford
15:00	Newton 49' (pen.)	Report	German 51'	Attendance: 2,375; Referee: Richard Wigglesworth

17 September 2011 9	Stockport County	2–0	Grimsby Town	Edgeley Park, Stockport
15:00	McConville 23'; Elliott 61'	Report		Attendance: 3,943; Referee: Sebastian Stockbridge

20 September 2011 10	Newport County	1–1	Stockport County	Newport Stadium, Newport
19:45	Rose 31'	Report	Elliott 82'	Attendance: 1,205; Referee: Graham Horwood

24 September 2011 11	Tamworth	1–1	Stockport County	The Lamb Ground, Tamworth
15:00	Christie 90'	Report	Chadwick 48'	Attendance: 1,381; Referee: Jeremy Simpson

27 September 2011 12	Stockport County	2–4	Fleetwood Town	Edgeley Park, Stockport
19:45	German 30' 71'	Report	Vieira 2'; Clancy 49'; Cox 57'; Mangan 90+4'	Attendance: 3,023; Referee: Ross Joyce

1 October 2011 13	Stockport County	1–2	York City	Edgeley Park, Stockport
15:00	Paton 90+4'	Report	Blair 52'; Walker 86'	Attendance: 3,753; Referee: Darren Bond

6 October 2011 14	Cambridge United	2–2	Stockport County	Abbey Stadium, Cambridge
19:45	Berry 12'; Patrick 74'	Report	Chadwick 3'; Whitehead 63'; Piergianni (red card) 64'	Attendance: 2,047; Referee: Nick Kinseley

11 October 2011 15	Stockport County	3–4	Darlington	Edgeley Park, Stockport
19:45	Chadwick 3'; Paton 12' 52'	Report	Chandler 2' 61'; Walshaw 32'; Taylor 85'	Attendance: 2,671; Referee: Wayne Barrett

15 October 2011 16	Wrexham	4–0	Stockport County	Racecourse Ground, Wrexham
15:00	Knight-Percival 3' 46'; Morrell 23'; Speight 75'	Report		Attendance: 3,874; Referee: Peter Banks

18 October 2011 17	Bath City	0–2	Stockport County	Twerton Park, Bath
19:45		Report	Chadwick 63'; Paton 90+1'	Attendance: 919; Referee: Amy Fearn

22 October 2011 18	Stockport County	0–1	Forest Green Rovers	Edgeley Park, Stockport
15:45		Report	Klukowski 36'	Attendance: 3,391; Referee: Richard West

5 November 2011 19	Stockport County	3–3	Hayes & Yeading	Edgeley Park, Stockport
15:00	Elliott 27'; Piergianni 30' 57'	Report	Sinclair 36'; Soares 75' 88'	Attendance: 2,804; Referee: Scott Duncan

12 November 2011 20	Ebbsfleet United	2–1	Stockport County	Stonebridge Road, Kent
15:00	Willock 81'; Pinney 88'	Report	Chadwick 21' (pen.)	Attendance: 1,119; Referee: Sebastian Stockbridge

19 November 2011 21	Fleetwood Town	2–1	Stockport County	Highbury Stadium, Fleetwood
17:45	Mangan 53'; Vardy 66'	Report	McConville 59' (pen.)	Attendance: 3,021; Referee: Wayne Barret

26 November 2011 22	Stockport County	0–1	Southport	Edgeley Park, Stockport
15:00		Report	Whalley (red card) 4'; Ledsham 74'	Attendance: 4,540; Referee: Karl Evans

29 November 2011 23	Grimsby Town	7–0	Stockport County	Blundell Park, Cleethorpes
19:45	Coulson 18'; Hearn 22' 45+1' 58'; Elding 32'; Green 35' l'Anson 64'	Report		Attendance: 2,254; Referee: Steve Bratt

6 December 2011 24	Stockport County	0–1	Gateshead	Edgeley Park, Stockport
19:45		Report	Shaw 59'	Attendance: 2,366; Referee: Wayne Barrett

17 December 2011 25	Stockport County	0–0	Alfreton Town	Edgeley Park, Stockport
15:00		Report		Attendance: 2,802; Referee: Scott Duncan

26 December 2011 26	Barrow	1–0	Stockport County	Holker Street, Barrow
15:00	Bolland 42'	Report		Referee: Richard Clark

1 January 2012 27	Stockport County	3–2	Barrow	Edgeley Park, Stockport
15:00	Sheridan 10' 84' (pen.); Connor 32'	Report	Baker 57' 67' (pen.)	Attendance: 3,301; Referee: Ross Joyce

7 January 2012 28	Gateshead	2–0	Stockport County	Gateshead International Stadium, Gateshead
15:00	Shaw 61' (pen.); Moore 64'	Report		Attendance: 846; Referee: Richard Wigglesworth

10 January 2012 29	Luton Town	1–0	Stockport County	Kenilworth Road, Luton
15:00	O'Connor 73' (pen.)	Report		Attendance: 5,588; Referee: Kevin Johnson

21 January 2012 30	Braintree Town	2–2	Stockport County	Cressing Road, Braintree
15:00	Thomas 58'; Symons 61'	Report	Connor 67'; D.L.Rowe 90'	Attendance: 833; Referee: Tim Robinson

24 January 2012 31	Stockport County	2–2	AFC Telford United	Edgeley Park, Stockport
15:00	O'Donnell 67'; Piergianni 82'	Report	Sharp 16'; Jones 34'; Trainer (red card) 79'	Attendance: 2,831; Referee: Amy Fearn

28 January 2012 32	Stockport County	2–1	Kidderminster Harriers	Edgeley Park, Stockport
15:00	McConville 21'; D.L.Rowe 55'	Report	Wright 56'	Attendance: 3,728; Referee: Jeremy Simpson

11 February 2012 33	Stockport County	2–2	Newport County	Edgeley Park, Stockport
15:00	D.L.Rowe 8' 60'	Report	Sandell 50' (red card) 58'; Harris 87'	Attendance: 3,565; Referee: Darren Bond

18 February 2012 34	York City	2–1	Stockport County	Bootham Crescent, York
15:00	Reed 84'; Blinkhorn 90+5'	Report	D.L.Rowe 8'	Attendance: 3,370; Referee: Tony Harrington

25 February 2012 35	Stockport County	1–0	Wrexham	Edgeley Park, Stockport
15:00	Mayebi 27' (o.g.)	Report	Harris (red card) 51'	Attendance: 4,518; Referee: Wayne Barrett

3 March 2012 36	Darlington	0–1	Stockport County	The Darlington Arena, Darlington
15:00		Report	D.L.Rowe 60' (pen.)	Attendance: 2,202; Referee: Ross Joyce

6 March 2012 37	Alfreton Town	6–1	Stockport County	North Street, Alfreton
19:45	Jarman 1' 37' (pen.) 86' (pen.); Wilson 25'; Clayton 68'; Arnold 77'	Report	Rose 90'	Attendance: 1,115; Referee: Sebastian Stockbridge

10 March 2012 38	Stockport County	0–1	Cambridge United	Edgeley Park, Stockport
15:00		Report	Tiryaki 14'	Attendance: 5,957; Referee: Scott Duncan

17 March 2012 39	Southport	5–0	Stockport County	Haig Avenue, Southport
15:00	Gray 41' 73'; Piergianni 64' (o.g.); Whalley 70' 76'	Report	Ormson (red card) 71'	Attendance: 1,648; Referee: Richard Clark

24 March 2012 40	Stockport County	4–0	Bath City	Edgeley Park, Stockport
15:00	Hattersley 14'; Elliott 55' 82'; Piergianni 61'	Report		Attendance: 3,744; Referee: Peter Banks

31 March 2012 41	Kettering Town	1–3	Stockport County	Nene Park, Irthlingborough
15:00	Westwood 76'	Report	Hattersley 29'; Newton 45'; Darkwah 90+1'	Attendance: 1,281; Referee: Rob Merchant

7 April 2012 42	Stockport County	4–0	Lincoln City	Edgeley Park, Stockport
15:00	Hattersley 6'; D.L.Rowe 11' 55'; Darkwah 90+1'	Report		Attendance: 3,975; Referee: Darren Bond

9 April 2012 43	Mansfield Town	2–1	Stockport County	One Call Stadium, Mansfield
15:00	Smith 47'; Briscoe 53'	Report	Rose 89'	Attendance: 3,883; Referee: Amy Fearn

14 April 2012 44	Stockport County	1–1	Braintree Town	Edgeley Park, Stockport
15:00	Hattersley 15'	Report	Quinton 90+3'	Attendance: 3,199; Referee: Richard Wigglesworth

21 April 2012 45	Stockport County	2–0	Tamworth	Edgeley Park, Stockport
15:00	O'Donnell 48'; Hattersley 77'	Report		Attendance: 6,393; Referee: Seb Stockbridge

28 April 2012 46	Hayes & Yeading	1–2	Stockport County	Kingfield Stadium, Woking
13:00	Owusu 15'	Report	Hattersley 7'; Connor 70'	Attendance: 654; Referee: Tim Robinson

=== FA Cup ===
29 October 2011 4Q	Southport	1–0	Stockport County	Haig Avenue, Southport
15:00	Owens 2'	Report		Attendance: 1,358; Referee: Richard Clark

=== FA Trophy ===
10 December 2011 R1	Stockport County	2–2	Stalybridge Celtic	Edgeley Park, Stockport
15:00	Elliott 5'; McConville 51'	Report	Jennings 35' 39'; Meynell (red card) 54'	Attendance: 1,690; Referee: Richard Clark

13 December 2011 R1 Replay	Stalybridge Celtic	2–1	Stockport County	Bower Fold, Stalybridge
19:45	Wilkinson 59'; Jennings 89'	Report	McConville 10'	Attendance: 1,049; Referee: Darren Handley

== Team ==
Sean McConville was signed from Accrington Stanley

Stockport entered the summer with three players (Matt Glennon, Mark Lynch and Matty Mainwaring) contracted for the season ahead, plus Cameron Darkwah accepting a contract after being promoted from the youth team. With Stockport needing to re-build over the summer the club offered five players new one-year contracts.Danny O'Donnell, Daniel Rowe and Andy Halls all accepted the new deals to stay on with the club, while Paul Turnbull and Greg Tansey rejected the new deals in favour of joining Northampton Town and Inverness Caledonian Thistle respectively.Martin Gritton became Ray Mathias' first and only signing of the summer, as Mathias left the club soon after.

"... the first game of the season is just over four weeks away and I've only got eight players"

— Dietmar Hamann,

Following new investment in the club, former German international Dietmar Hamann was appointed as first team manager, and he quickly brought in midfielders Sean McConville, Jon Nolan, Ryan Fraughan and striker John Miles, as well as appointing Willie McStay as his assistant manager. This was followed by the signings of Nick Chadwick, Euan Holden, Ryan McCann and Sam Sheridan.Jon Routledge and Danny Hall were then added to the squad on the eve of the season. Stockport revealed the official squad numbers for the season on 8 August 2011. On 10 August, Stockport added another defender to the books, signing Carl Piergianni from Peterborough United. On 11 August, Stockport signed another three new players to the squad, Keigan Parker and Nabil Bounab from Mansfield Town and Étoile Fréjus Saint-Raphaël respectively, striker Tom Elliott was also signed after a successful trial. On 15 August, Hamann went back to is old club Leicester City to sign nineteen-year-old striker Elliott Chamberlain on a months loan. On 25 August Stockport lost Keigan Parker whose contract was terminated and Luke Ashworth whose trial period at the club had ended, Cameron Darkwah was also sent out on loan to Mossley for a period of one month. On transfer deadline day Stockport secured the signing of Michael Paton on a loan move from Aberdeen until the end of the year. Just a day later the club announced the signing of Chris Blackburn, as well as the release of Danny Hall who joined neighbours Hyde the following day. Stockport announced their third signing in three days, when they announced that striker Antonio German had joined the club until January 2012. On 9 September, Matty Mainwaring left the club after his contract was cancelled by mutual consent. On 23 September Stockport announced that Cameron Darkwah loan to Mossley was extended by a further month. On 28 September Stockport signed Bristol City right back Joe Edwards on an initial one month emergency loan deal. On 2 November Joe Edwards loan deal was extended until January. Stockport then added Goalkeeper Mark Halstead to their squad on a three-month loan from Blackpool. On 24 November 2011 county brought in Derby County youngster Aaron Cole while also sending Nick Chadwick out on loan to Plymouth Argyle. Both loans are until 3 January 2012. On 30 November Michael Paton returned to Aberdeen earlier than expected due to him, having to have a hernia operation. On 13 December, Joe Connor joined the team on non-contract terms and therefore can leave whenever he wants to. Joe Connor is also the grandson of Stockport legend Jack Connor. On 24 December, Stockport announced that two players would be leaving. Those players were Antonio German whose contract would not be renewed and Mark Halstead who returned to Blackpool after he was recalled from his loan spell.

On 3 January 2012 Stockport Announced that Joe Edwards had returned to Bristol City after his loan spell with the club had ended. Stockport also announced that Aaron Cole's loan from Derby County was extended by a further month. A day later the club announced that Danny Rowe had signed on a months loan from Fleetwood Town F.C. He will have D.L.Rowe on the back of his shirt so he is not confused with Stockport's own Danny Rowe The club also announced that Nick Chadwick had left the club, and gone to Plymouth Argyle on a free transfer as well as Chris Blackburn signing for Telford United after his release earlier in the day. On 12 January, Stockport announced that Cameron Darkwah was being loaned out for the second time this season, this time to Conference North club to FC Halifax Town. On 17 January, Stockport confirmed the loan signing of a player that was released in September. This player was Matty Mainwaring who has signed on a one-month loan deal from Hull City On 23 January, Stockport announced that former skipper Paul Turnbull was set to join on loan from Northampton Town until 25 February and also that Ryan Fraughan was set to join Welsh premier league side The New Saints until the end of the 2011–12 season. On 27 January Stockport announced that Sam Sheridan would be leaving them to join Southport on a months loan. After Jon Routledge was taken on trial by Yeovil, the rumour was that he would be going there, on loan until the end of the season. It was not until he returned to Stockport that they announced he would actually be going back to his old club Hamilton Academical on loan until the end of the season. On Transfer deadline day (January 2012) Stockport announced that Matt Glennon, Mark Lynch, John Miles and Ryan McCann had left the club by mutual consent. Also announced was that Aaron Cole's and Danny L. Rowe's loan deals were extended until the end of the season, while Joe Connor had earned himself a six-month contract taking him up to the end of the season. During this time manager Jim Gannon announced his reasoning behind the transfers. On 2 February Stockport announced that 25-year-old Norwegian Goalkeeper Morten Bredal-Thorsen had been given an extended trial. One day later it was reported that Mark Lynch and John Miles had signed for Altrincham following their releases, however on 10 February Stockport announced that Mark Lynch had returned to the club on a part-time basis to help with a fitness training of the reserve team. Also on 10 February it was reported in the Lancaster Guardian that Lancaster City striker Danny Hattersley and midfielder Alex Kenyon were on trial with Stockport. During Stockport's Match at home to Newport County former goalkeeper coach Bernhard Hirmer was announced as being on the bench – This was due to lack of goalkeepers at the club. On 15 February Stockport announced that Cameron Darkwah's loan to FC Halifax Town would be extended until 17 March 2012. A day later the club announced that they will be loaning out Nabil Bounab to Buxton for a month. On 21 February Sam Sheridan returned from his loan spell at Southport. On 24 February Stockport county extended the loans of Paul Turnbull and Matty Mainwaring for a further month. Stockport also announced that they had signed Jordan Rose on a non contract basis. On 13 March it was announced that Martin Gritton would be leaving the club after he requested his contract to be cancelled. Two days later the club announced that they had signed Lancaster City striker Danny Hattersley on an 18-month contract. On 21 March Stockport announced that they had secured the services of 18-year-old Lewis King on an "emergency" loan from Sunderland. The next Day Stockport announced that Sean McConville would be going to Rochdale on a months loan. A day later Stockport announced the signing of Sean Newton on loan from Telford United until the end of the season. On 27 March Stockport announced that the loan deals concerning Paul Turnbull and Matty Mainwaring would be extended up to the allowed 93 days.

=== Squad ===
Number	Nationality	Position	Name	Total		League		FA Cup		FA Trophy	
Number	Nationality	Position	Name	Apps	Goals	Apps	Goals	Apps	Goals	Apps	Goals
1	GK	(England) ENG	Matt Glennon (1283)	26	0	24	0	0	0	2	0
1	GK	(Germany) GER	Bernhard Hirmer (1329)	1	0	1	0	0	0	0	0
2	DF	(England) ENG	Mark Lynch (1280)	7	0	6	0	1	0	0	0
2	DF	(England) ENG	Jordan Rose (1288)	10	2	10	2	0	0	0	0
3	DF	(United States) USA	Euan Holden (1306)	35	1	33	1	1	0	1	0
4	MF	(England) ENG	Jon Routledge (1309)	15	0	13	0	1	0	1	0
5	DF	(England) ENG	Danny O'Donnell (1295)	37	2	34	2	1	0	2	0
6	FW	(England) ENG	Danny L. Rowe (1326)	15	8	15	8	0	0	0	0
6	FW	(England) ENG	Antonio German (1317)	17	3	16	3	0	0	1	0
6	DF	(England) ENG	Danny Hall (1305)	1	0	1	0	0	0	0	0
7	MF	(England) ENG	Sean McConville (1315)	25	6	23	4	0	0	2	2
8	MF	(England) ENG	Jon Nolan (1316)	33	0	31	0	0	0	2	0
9	FW	(Scotland) SCO	Martin Gritton (1304)	11	0	11	0	0	0	0	0
9	FW	(England) ENG	Josh Amis	0	0	0	0	0	0	0	0
10	FW	(England) ENG	John Miles (1308)	15	0	14	0	1	0	0	0
10	FW	(England) ENG	Danny Hattersley (1328)	8	6	8	6	0	0	0	0
11	MF	(England) ENG	Ryan Fraughan (1303)	10	0	10	0	0	0	0	0
12	GK	(England) ENG	Ian Ormson (1327)	14	0	13	0	1	0	0	0
13	FW	(England) ENG	Cameron Darkwah (1287)	9	2	7	2	1	0	1	0
14	MF	(Ireland) EIR	Sam Sheridan (1310)	28	2	27	2	0	0	1	0
15	MF	(England) ENG	Matty Mainwaring (1249)	0	0	0	0	0	0	0	0
15	FW	(England) ENG	Danny Whitehead (1320)	18	1	17	1	1	0	0	0
16	DF	(Scotland) SCO	Ryan McCann (1307)	20	0	18	0	1	0	1	0
16	DF	(England) ENG	Sean Newton (1331)	7	1	7	1	0	0	0	0
17	DF	(England) ENG	Andy Halls (1260)	30	0	28	0	0	0	2	0
18	MF	(England) ENG	Danny M. Rowe (1261)	29	0	27	0	0	0	2	0
19	FW	(England) ENG	Nick Chadwick (1302)	20	7	19	7	1	0	0	0
19	MF	(England) ENG	Matty Mainwaring (1249) ^{2}	15	0	15	0	0	0	0	0
20	FW	(England) ENG	Tom Elliott (1311)	44	8	42	7	0	0	2	1
21	MF	(France) FRA	Nabil Bounab (1301)	11	0	11	0	0	0	0	0
22	DF	(England) ENG	Carl Piergianni (1312)	43	4	40	4	1	0	2	0
23	FW	(Scotland) SCO	Keigan Parker (1314)	1	0	1	0	0	0	0	0
23	FW	(Scotland) SCO	Michael Paton (1319)	16	4	15	4	1	0	0	0
23	MF	(England) ENG	Paul Turnbull (1182)	14	0	14	0	0	0	0	0
24	FW	(Wales) WAL	Elliott Chamberlain (1313)	5	0	5	0	0	0	0	0
24	DF	(England) ENG	Joe Edwards (1321)	13	0	11	0	0	0	2	0
25	DF	(England) ENG	Chris Blackburn (1318)	17	0	15	0	0	0	2	0
27	GK	(England) ENG	Dane Smith	0	0	0	0	0	0	0	0
28	GK	(England) ENG	Mark Halstead (1322)	4	0	4	0	0	0	0	0
28	GK	(England) ENG	Lewis King (1330)	5	0	5	0	0	0	0	0
29	MF	(England) ENG	Aaron Cole (1323)	18	0	16	0	0	0	2	0
30	DF	(England) ENG	Kyle Brownhill (1332)	2	0	2	0	0	0	0	0
31	DF	(England) ENG	Ben Say (1324)	1	0	1	0	0	0	0	0
32	MF	(England) ENG	Joe Connor (1325)	21	3	21	3	0	0	0	0

Last updated: 28 April 2012..

^{2} The Player Left and then returned to the club at a later point in the season. Therefore, the player had a change of squad number and is on the list twice.

The numbers in brackets are the player's unique Stockport County Appearance Number (SCAN), showing his position in the list of players to make their debut for the club in a senior competitive game.

=== Transfers ===
==== In ====
Date	Pos.	Name	From	Fee	Notes
21 June 2011	FW	Martin Gritton	Yeovil Town	Free	
8 July 2011	MF	Sean McConville	Accrington Stanley	Free	
12 July 2011	MF	Jon Nolan	Everton	Free	
12 July 2011	FW	John Miles	Fleetwood Town	Free	
12 July 2011	MF	Ryan Fraughan	Tranmere Rovers	Free	
29 July 2011	FW	Nick Chadwick	Barrow	Free	
29 July 2011	DF	Euan Holden	FC Hjørring	Free	
29 July 2011	DF	Ryan McCann	Ayr United	Free	
29 July 2011	MF	Sam Sheridan	Bolton Wanderers	Free	
8 August 2011	DF	Danny Hall	Crawley Town	Free	
8 August 2011	MF	Jon Routledge	Hamilton Academical	Free	
10 August 2011	DF	Carl Piergianni	Peterborough United	Free	
11 August 2011	FW	Keigan Parker	Mansfield Town	Free	
11 August 2011	FW	Tom Elliott	Unattatched	Free	
11 August 2011	MF	Nabil Bounab	Étoile Fréjus Saint-Raphaël	Free	
1 September 2011	DF	Chris Blackburn	Wrexham	Free	
2 September 2011	FW	Antonio German	Queens Park Rangers	Free	
13 December 2011	MF	Joe Connor	Unattatched	Free	
24 February 2012	DF	Jordan Rose	Unattatched	Free	
15 March 2012	FW	Danny Hattersley	Lancaster City	Undisclosed	

==== Out ====
Date	Pos.	Name	To	Fee	Notes
25 May 2011	DF	Mansour Assoumani	Unattatched	Free	
25 May 2011	FW	Tom Fisher	Macclesfield Town	Free	
25 May 2011	DF	Alan Goodall	Fleetwood Town	Free	
25 May 2011	MF	Adam Griffin	Hyde	Free	
25 May 2011	MF	David Poole	Droylsden	Free	
25 May 2011	FW	Matty Kosylo	Unattatched	Free	
25 May 2011	MF	Craig Roberts	Unattatched	Free	
25 May 2011	DF	Jordan Rose	Eastleigh	Free	
25 May 2011	MF	Jake Simpson	Workington	Free	
25 May 2011	DF	Danny Swailes	Retired	Free	
25 May 2011	MF	James Vincent	Kidderminster Harriers	Free	
17 June 2011	MF	Greg Tansey	Inverness CT	Free	
29 June 2011	MF	Paul Turnbull	Northampton Town	Undisclosed	
25 August 2011	FW	Keigan Parker	Unattached	Free	
25 August 2011	DF	Luke Ashworth	Unattached	Free	
1 September 2011	DF	Danny Hall	Hyde	Free	
9 September 2011	MF	Matty Mainwaring	Unattached	Free	
2 January 2012	FW	Antonio German	Unattached	Free	
4 January 2012	FW	Nick Chadwick	Plymouth Argyle	Free	
4 January 2012	MF	Chris Blackburn	Telford United	Free	
31 January 2012	GK	Matt Glennon	Unattached	Free	
31 January 2012	DF	Mark Lynch	Unattached	Free	
31 January 2012	FW	John Miles	Unattached	Free	
31 January 2012	FW	Ryan McCann	Unattached	Free	
13 March 2012	FW	Martin Gritton	Unatached	Free	

==== Loans in ====
Date	Pos.	Name	From	Expiry	Notes
15 August 2011	FW	Elliott Chamberlain	Leicester City	15 September 2011	
31 August 2011	FW	Michael Paton	Aberdeen	3 January 2012 ^{3}	
28 September 2011	DF	Joe Edwards	Bristol City	3 January 2012	
11 November 2011	GK	Mark Halstead	Blackpool	11 January 2012 ^{4}	
24 November 2011	MF	Aaron Cole	Derby County	Until end of the season.	
4 January 2012	FW	Danny Rowe	Fleetwood Town	4 March 2012	
17 January 2012	MF	Matty Mainwaring	Hull City	19 February 2012	
23 January 2012	MF	Paul Turnbull	Northampton Town	25 February 2012	
21 March 2012	GK	Lewis King	Sunderland	28 April 2012	
23 March 2012	DF	Sean Newton	Telford United	Until the end of the season.	

^{3} The Player returned to his parent club earlier than expect due to an injury.
^{4} The Player was recalled to his parent club earlier than expected.

==== Loans Out ====
Date	Pos.	Name	To	Expiry	Notes
25 August 2011	FW	Cameron Darkwah	Mossley	25 October 2011	
24 November 2011	FW	Nick Chadwick	Plymouth Argyle	3 January 2012	
14 January 2012	FW	Cameron Darkwah	FC Halifax Town	17 March 2012	
23 January 2012	MF	Ryan Fraughan	The New Saints	Until the end of the season.	
27 January 2012	MF	Sam Sheridan	Southport	23 February 2012	
28 January 2012	MF	Jon Routledge	Hamilton Academical	Until the end of the season.	
16 February 2012	DF	Nabil Bounab	Buxton	16 March 2012	
22 March 2012	MF	Sean McConville	Rochdale	22 April 2012	
