= Danny Whitehead =

English footballer (born 1993)

Personal information
- Full name: Daniel Whitehead
- Date of birth: 23 October 1993 (age 33)
- Place of birth: Trafford, England
- Height: 5 ft 10 in (1.79 m)
- Position: Midfielder

Team information
- Current team: Curzon Ashton

Youth career
- 2008–2011: Stockport County

Senior career*
Years	Team	Apps	(Gls)
2011–2013	Stockport County	59	(6)
2013–2015	West Ham United	0	(0)
2015	Accrington Stanley	2	(0)
2015–2016	Macclesfield Town	24	(4)
2016–2017	Wigan Athletic	0	(0)
2016–2017	→ Macclesfield Town (loan)	12	(2)
2016–2017	→ Cheltenham Town (loan)	6	(0)
2017	→ Macclesfield Town (loan)	9	(1)
2017–2018	Macclesfield Town	35	(6)
2018–2020	Salford City	50	(5)
2020	→ Macclesfield Town (loan)	10	(0)
2020–2022	Port Vale	15	(0)
2021	→ Altrincham (loan)	6	(0)
2022–2024	AFC Fylde	83	(6)
2024–2026	Macclesfield (Note: Statistics for the 2025–26 season not known.)	22	(1)
2026–	Curzon Ashton	0	(0)
- * Club domestic league appearances and goals as of 19:28, 1 May 2026 (UTC)

Daniel Whitehead (born 23 October 1993) is an English footballer who plays as a midfielder for Northern Premier League Premier Division club Curzon Ashton.

Whitehead began his career at Stockport County, making his first-team debut during the 2011–12 season. He was sold to West Ham United in June 2013 and featured in one FA Cup game before his contract was terminated in January 2015. He had a brief spell at Accrington Stanley two months later before joining Macclesfield Town in July 2015. He was sold to Wigan Athletic in January 2016, though he returned to Macclesfield on loan for the rest of the 2015–16 season. He spent the first half of the 2016–17 season on loan at Cheltenham Town. He ended the season back on loan at Macclesfield Town, for whom he was an unused substitute in the 2017 FA Trophy final.

His contract at Wigan was terminated in September 2017, and he rejoined Macclesfield Town permanently. He was a key player as the club won promotion back to the English Football League after finishing top of the National League table in the 2017–18 season. He signed with Salford City in May 2018 and helped the club to win promotion out of the National League via the play-offs in 2019. He returned to Macclesfield Town for a third loan spell at the club in January 2020 and joined Port Vale on a free transfer in August 2020. Transfer-listed at Port Vale at the end of the 2020–21 season, he was loaned out to Altrincham in October 2021. He joined AFC Fylde in January 2022 and helped the club to the National League North title at the end of the 2022–23 season. He signed with Macclesfield in May 2024 and helped the club to the 2024–25 Northern Premier League Premier Division title. He joined Curzon Ashton in June 2026.

== Career ==
=== Stockport County ===
Whitehead joined Stockport County at the age of 15. At the age of 17 he sat on the bench in five games at the end of the 2010–11 season as the club were relegated out of the Football League. He made his senior debut for the "Hatters" on 27 September 2011, coming on as a 75h-minute substitute for Michael Paton in a 4–2 defeat to Fleetwood Town at Edgeley Park. He scored his first career goal on 6 October, in a 2–2 draw at Cambridge United. He ended the 2011–12 season with 18 appearances to his name, as Stockport posted a 16th-place finish in the Conference Premier, and he signed a new contract in the summer. He was a key player for manager Jim Gannon in the 2012–13 campaign, scoring six goals in 45 appearances as County dropped into the Conference North with a second relegation in three years. He then handed in a transfer request to the new manager Ian Bogie.

=== West Ham United ===
He was recommended to Premier League club West Ham United by former Stockport boss Dietmar Hamann and was signed for an undisclosed fee on 20 June 2013 after impressing "Hammers" manager Sam Allardyce whilst on trial; he signed a two-year contract with the option of a third year. He made his first-team debut on 5 January 2014 at Nottingham Forest in the FA Cup; West Ham lost the game 5–0. This was his only appearance for West Ham and he left the Boleyn Ground when his contract was terminated on 28 January 2015 as part of a "massive cull of the development squad" by Terry Westley.

=== Accrington Stanley ===
On 17 March 2015, Whitehead signed a short-term contract with League Two side Accrington Stanley. He made his debut for Stanley later that day, coming on for Sean Maguire 75 minutes into a 2–2 draw at Wycombe Wanderers. He made his first start in the Football League on 25 April, in a 4–0 defeat at Dagenham & Redbridge. These were his only two appearances during his time at the Crown Ground and he was not retained by manager John Coleman at the end of the 2014–15 season.

=== Macclesfield Town ===
On 31 July 2015, Whitehead signed a one-year deal with National League club Macclesfield Town after a successful trial period. He scored his first goal for the club on 29 August, the opening goal of a 2–1 defeat to Chester, latching on to a cross from Danny Rowe to smash a shot from the edge of the area into the bottom right corner of the net. Paul Turnbull picked up an injury early the next month, which gave Whitehead establish himself in the first-team with a run of 18 successive starts.

=== Wigan Athletic ===
On 8 January 2016, Whitehead signed a two-and-a-half-year-deal with League One side Wigan Athletic for an undisclosed fee; "Latics" boss Gary Caldwell cited the player's potential, saying "every club is on the lookout for fresh talent". He was immediately loaned back to Macclesfield for the remainder of the 2015–16 season and scored seven goals from 41 appearances as Macclesfield posted a tenth-place finish in the National League.

On 22 July 2016, he joined League Two club Cheltenham Town on a season-long loan after manager Gary Johnson saw him as a player who "will fit our game perfectly". He started the "Robins" opening game of the 2016–17 season, a 1–1 draw with Leyton Orient at Whaddon Road. However, he was dropped to the bench at the end of the month. His loan spell was terminated on 1 January after he went nearly two months without playing a game.

=== Return to Macclesfield Town ===
On 20 January 2017, he rejoined former side Macclesfield Town on loan until the end of the 2016–17 season. He played ten games for Macclesfield, scoring two goals, including the only goal of the third round FA Trophy game with Forest Green Rovers. Macclesfield went on to reach the 2017 FA Trophy final, though Whitehead was an unused substitute at Wembley Stadium as his teammates were beaten 3–2 by York City.

On 14 September 2017, his contract at Wigan was mutually terminated, and he rejoined Macclesfield Town on a contract until the end of the 2017–18 season. He scored seven goals in 38 games, helping Macclesfield to win promotion back into the Football League as champions of the National League. He was offered a new contract in the summer.

=== Salford City ===
On 17 May 2018, he joined Salford City; "Ammies" manager Graham Alexander that "Whitehead had a fantastic season last year at this level, scored some important goals but his overall play, he was one of the best players at this level so we were delighted to get him on board". He made his debut in the opening match of the 2018–19 season on 4 August as Salford drew 1–1 with Leyton Orient at Moor Lane. He scored four goals from 44 appearances throughout the campaign and played in the National League play-off final as Salford secured a place in the EFL with a 3–0 victory over AFC Fylde at Wembley.

He scored his first goal in League Two on 24 August 2019, converting a penalty as Salford drew 2–2 at Carlisle United. On 21 January 2020, he rejoined Macclesfield Town for a fourth spell, on loan until the end of the 2019–20 season. He featured ten times, helping Mark Kennedy's "Silkmen" to avoid relegation despite having had 13 points deducted.

=== Port Vale ===
On 3 August 2020, Whitehead cancelled the last year of his contract with Salford and signed a two-year deal with League Two rivals Port Vale. The move reunited him with former Macclesfield boss John Askey, who brought Whitehead in to compete with Luke Joyce, Manny Oyeleke, Scott Burgess and Tom Conlon for one of three places in central midfield. He failed to make much on an impact early in the 2020–21 season having struggled with injuries and poor form. He was transfer-listed by new manager Darrell Clarke at the end of the campaign. He was not given a squad number for the 2021–22 season and Clarke said that he would try and arrange a loan move into the National League.

On 15 October 2021, he joined National League club Altrincham on a one-month loan deal. He featured ten times for the "Robins" before he was recalled to his parent club on Christmas Eve after Vale suffered an injury and illness crisis. On 7 January 2022, he left Port Vale after his contract was cancelled by mutual consent.

=== AFC Fylde ===
On 11 January 2022, Whitehead joined AFC Fylde on a contract until the end of the 2021–22 season, with the club retaining the option of a further 12 months. He scored one goal in eleven appearances for James Rowe's "Coasters", including the play-off semi-final defeat to Boston United at Mill Farm. He scored three goals in 38 games over the course of the 2022–23 campaign as Fylde secured promotion as champions of the National League North. He departed the club at the end of the 2023–24 season after making another 42 appearances for the club.

=== Later career ===
On 31 May 2024, Whitehead joined Northern Premier League Premier Division side Macclesfield, the phoenix club of Macclesfield Town. Manager Robbie Savage made him part of the club's senior leadership group. He featured 27 times in the 2024–25 campaign, helping Macclesfield to win the league title with six games left to play. He was a substitute in the 2–1 victory over Crystal Palace in the third round of the FA Cup on 10 January 2026.

On 20 June 2026, he signed a one-year contract with Curzon Ashton, with manager Adam Barton saying he was "a massive signing".

== Style of play ==
Whitehead has been described as an energetic, versatile and hard-working midfielder.

== Career statistics ==
As of end of the 2025–26 season

Appearances and goals by club, season and competition
Club	Season	League			FA Cup		EFL Cup		Other		Total	
Club	Season	Division	Apps	Goals	Apps	Goals	Apps	Goals	Apps	Goals	Apps	Goals
Stockport County	2010–11	League Two	0	0	—		—		—		0	0
Stockport County	2011–12	Conference Premier	17	1	1	0	—		0	0	18	1
Stockport County	2012–13	Conference Premier	42	5	2	1	—		1 (Note: Appearance in the FA Trophy)	0	45	6
Stockport County	Stockport County total		59	6	3	1	0	0	1	0	63	7
West Ham United	2013–14	Premier League	0	0	1	0	0	0	—		1	0
West Ham United	2014–15	Premier League	0	0	0	0	0	0	—		0	0
West Ham United	West Ham United total		0	0	1	0	0	0	0	0	1	0
Accrington Stanley	2014–15	League Two	2	0	—		—		—		2	0
Macclesfield Town	2015–16	National League	24	4	2	0	0	0	1	1	27	5
Wigan Athletic	2015–16	League One	0	0	—		—		—		0	0
Wigan Athletic	2016–17	Championship	0	0	0	0	0	0	—		0	0
Wigan Athletic	2017–18	League One	0	0	0	0	0	0	0	0	0	0
Wigan Athletic	Wigan Athletic total		0	0	0	0	0	0	0	0	0	0
Macclesfield Town (loan)	2015–16	National League	12	2	0	0	—		2	0	14	2
Cheltenham Town (loan)	2016–17	League Two	6	0	1	0	1	0	2 (Note: Appearance in the EFL Trophy)	0	10	0
Macclesfield Town (loan)	2016–17	National League	9	1	0	0	—		1	1	10	2
Macclesfield Town	2017–18	National League	35	6	2	1	—		1	0	38	7
Salford City	2018–19	National League	38	4	3	1	—		3 (Note: 1 appearance in the FA Trophy and 2 appearances in the play-offs)	0	44	4
Salford City	2019–20	League Two	12	1	1	0	1	0	3	0	17	1
Salford City	Salford City total		50	5	4	1	1	0	6	0	61	6
Macclesfield Town (loan)	2019–20	League Two	10	0	—		—		—		10	0
Macclesfield Town (loan)	Macclesfield Town total		90	13	4	1	0	0	5	1	99	16
Port Vale	2020–21	League Two	15	0	0	0	2	1	3	0	20	1
Port Vale	2021–22	League Two	0	0	0	0	0	0	0	0	0	0
Port Vale	Port Vale total		15	0	0	0	2	1	3	0	20	1
Altrincham (loan)	2021–22	National League	6	0	3	0	—		1	0	10	0
AFC Fylde	2021–22	National League North	10	1	0	0	—		1 (Note: Appearance in the play-offs)	0	11	1
AFC Fylde	2022–23	National League North	33	3	4	0	—		1	0	38	3
AFC Fylde	2023–24	National League	40	2	1	0	—		1	0	42	2
AFC Fylde	AFC Fylde total		83	6	5	0	0	0	3	0	91	6
Macclesfield	2024–25	Northern Premier League; Premier Division	22	1	1	0	—		4	0	27	1
Curzon Ashton	2026–27	Northern Premier League; Premier Division	0	0	0	0	—		0	0	0	0
Career total			333	31	22	3	4	1	25	2	384	37

== Honours ==
Macclesfield Town

- FA Trophy runner-up: 2017
- National League: 2017–18

Salford City

- National League play-offs: 2019

AFC Fylde

- National League North: 2022–23

Macclesfield

- Northern Premier League Premier Division: 2024–25
