= 2017 FA Trophy final =

2017 FA Trophy Final
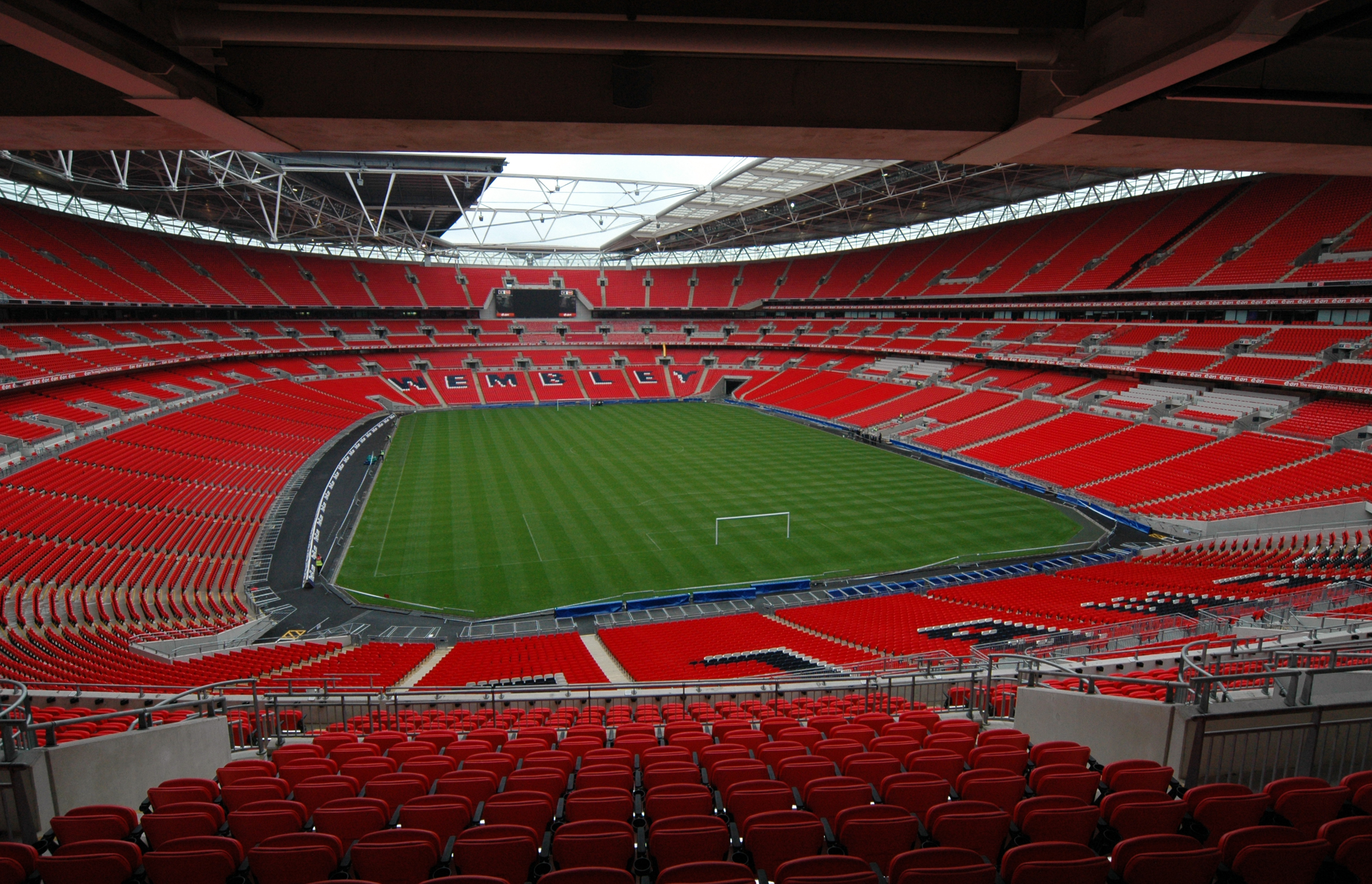
- Wembley Stadium hosted the final
- Event: 2016–17 FA Trophy
Macclesfield Town	York City
2	3
- Date: 21 May 2017
- Venue: Wembley Stadium, London
- Man of the Match: Sean Newton (York City FC)
- Referee: Paul Tierney (Lancashire)
- Attendance: 38,224 (including FA Vase Final)

The 2016–17 FA Trophy Final was the 48th final of the Football Association's cup competition for teams at levels 5–8 of the English football league system. The match was contested between Macclesfield Town and York City. The final of the FA Vase was played on the same day at the same venue for the second year running. Both matches were televised in the UK on BT Sport. York City won the final 3–2 and became the second club in as many seasons, after Halifax in 2016, to get relegated from the National League and then win the FA Trophy in the same season.

Macclesfield Town defeated Altrincham, AFC Sudbury, Forest Green Rovers, Dulwich Hamlet and Tranmere Rovers en route to the final.

York City defeated Worcester City, Harlow Town, Nuneaton Town, Brackley Town and Lincoln City en route to the final.

== Route to the final ==
=== Macclesfield Town ===
20 December 2016 1R	Altrincham	1–1	Macclesfield Town	Altrincham
19:45	Miller 39'		James 61'	Stadium: Moss Lane; Attendance: 717; Referee: Mr Andrew Miller

4 January 2017 1RR	Macclesfield Town	2–1	Altrincham	Macclesfield
19:45	Whitaker 49'; Rowe 83'		Cain 25'	Stadium: Moss Rose; Attendance: 548; Referee: Mr Joe Johnson

14 January 2017 2R	AFC Sudbury	1–3	Macclesfield Town	Sudbury
15:00	Wales 88'		Browne 23'; Dudley 32'; Sampson 84'	Stadium: King's Marsh; Attendance: 505

4 February 2017 3R	Macclesfield Town	1–0	Forest Green Rovers	Macclesfield
15:00				Stadium: Moss Rose; Attendance: 967

25 February 2017 4R	Dulwich Hamlet	2–2	Macclesfield Town	East Dulwich
15:00				Stadium: Champion Hill; Attendance: 2,834

7 March 2017 4RR	Macclesfield Town	2–0	Dulwich Hamlet	Macclesfield
				Stadium: Moss Rose

11 March 2017 SF 1st	Macclesfield Town	1–1	Tranmere Rovers	Macclesfield
	Norburn 54'		Hughes 2' (pen.)	Stadium: Moss Rose; Attendance: 2,358

14 March 2017 SF 2nd	Tranmere Rovers	0–1 (1–2 agg.)	Macclesfield Town	Birkenhead
				Stadium: Prenton Park; Attendance: 6,100

=== York City ===
10 December 2016 1R	York City	3–1	Worcester City	York
15:00				Stadium: Bootham Crescent; Attendance: 1,033

14 January 2017 2R	Harlow Town	1–2	York City	Harlow
				Stadium: Barrows Farm Stadium; Attendance: 816

4 February 2017 3R	Nuneaton Town	0–3	York City	Nuneaton
				Stadium: Liberty Way; Attendance: 687

25 February 2017 4R	York City	1–0	Brackley Town	York
				Stadium: Bootham Crescent; Attendance: 1,994

14 March 2017 SF 1st	York City	2–1	Lincoln City	York
	Oliver 53'; Connolly 69'		Angol 14' (pen.)	Stadium: Bootham Crescent; Attendance: 3,294

18 March 2017 SF 2nd	Lincoln City	1–1 (2–3 agg.)	York City	Lincoln
				Stadium: Sincil Bank; Attendance: 8,409

== Match ==
=== Details ===
21 May 2017
16:15 BST

Macclesfield Town	2–3	York City
R. Browne 13'; O. Norburn 45+1'		J. Parkin 8'; V. Oliver 22'; A. Connolly 86'

Wembley Stadium, London
Attendance: 38,224
Referee: Paul Tierney (Lancashire)

GK	22	(England) Scott Flinders
DF	2	(England) Andy Halls (c)
DF	5	(England) George Pilkington
DF	4	(Republic of Ireland) Neill Byrne	(substituted off) 67'
DF	3	(England) David Fitzpatrick
MF	14	(England) Kingsley James
MF	7	(Antigua and Barbuda) Rhys Browne
MF	23	(England) Danny Whitaker
MF	15	(England) Oliver Norburn	(substituted off) 89'
MF	16	(England) Mitch Hancox	(substituted off) 87'
FW	9	(England) Chris Holroyd
Substitutes:
GK	13	(England) Craig Ross
DF	6	(England) John McCombe	(substituted on) 67'
MF	30	(England) Luke Summerfield	(substituted on) 87'
FW	8	(England) Danny Whitehead
FW	29	(England) Anthony Dudley	(substituted on) 89'
Manager: (England) John Askey

GK	28	(Wales) Kyle Letheren
DF	36	(Wales) Daniel Parslow
DF	10	(England) Yan Klukowski	(substituted off) 46'
DF	37	(Algeria) Hamza Bencherif
MF	8	(England) Simon Heslop (c)
MF	33	(England) Sean Newton
MF	17	(England) Asa Hall	(substituted off) 69'
MF	35	(England) Danny Holmes	(substituted off) 75'
MF	9	(England) Amari Morgan-Smith
FW	29	(England) Vadaine Oliver
FW	31	(England) Jon Parkin
Substitutes:
GK	13	(England) Luke Simpson
DF	2	(Scotland) Shaun Rooney	(substituted on) 75'
MF	34	(Portugal) Adriano Moke	(substituted on) 46'
FW	12	(Scotland) Aidan Connolly	(substituted on) 69'
FW	21	(England) Scott Fenwick
Manager: (England) Gary Mills

Man of the match

- Sean Newton (York City)

Match officials

- Assistant referees:

Match rules

- 90 minutes.
- 30 minutes of extra-time if necessary.
- Penalty shoot-out if scores still level.
- Five named substitutes.
- Maximum of three substitutions.
