= Sean Newton =

English association football player (born 1988)

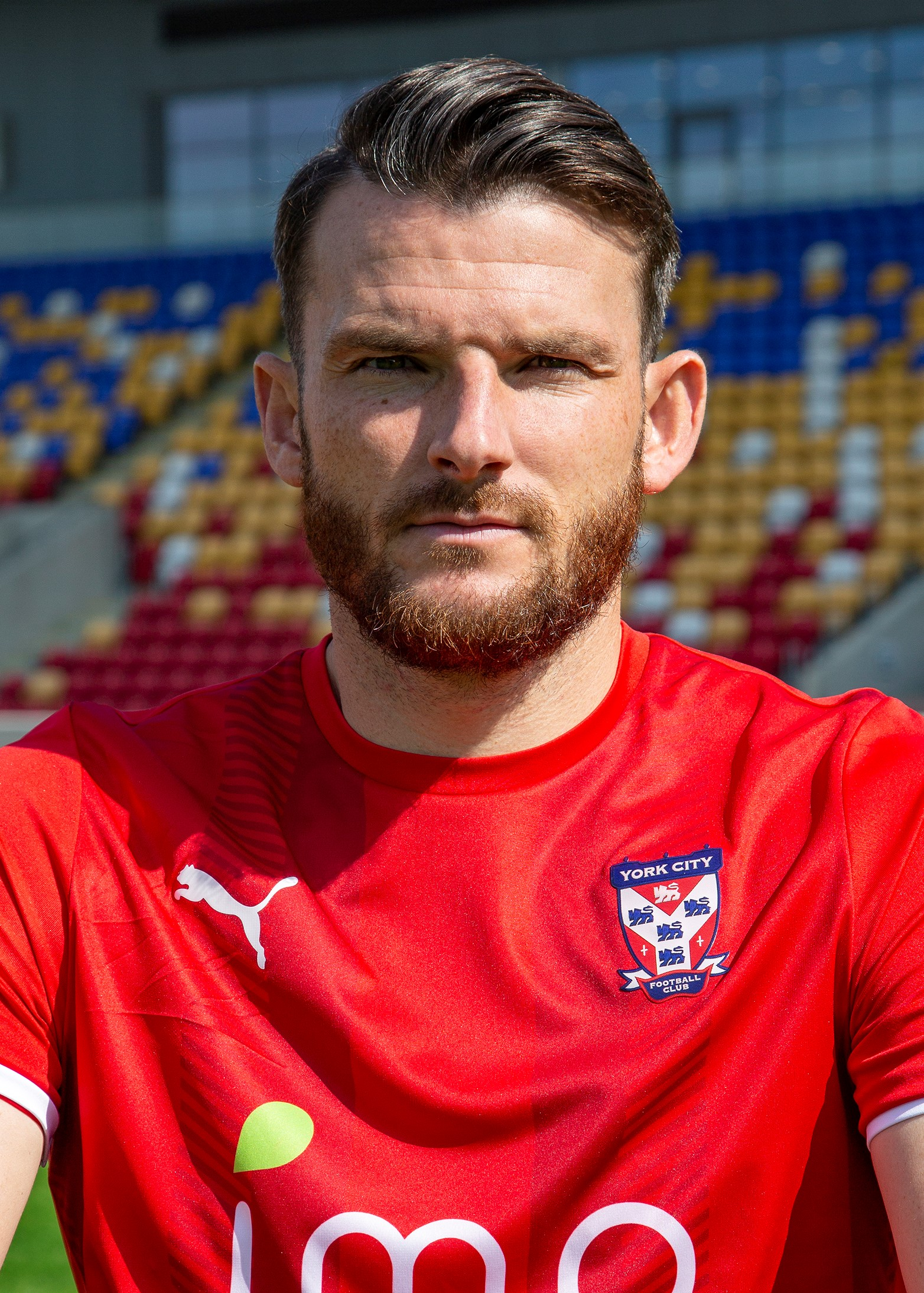
- Newton with York City in 2021

Personal information
- Full name: Sean Michael Newton
- Date of birth: 23 September 1988 (age 38)
- Place of birth: Liverpool, England
- Height: 6 ft 0 in (1.83 m)
- Position: Left-back

Team information
- Current team: Ashton United

Youth career
- –2007: Chester City

Senior career*
Years	Team	Apps	(Gls)
2007–2008	Chester City	2	(0)
2007	→ Southport (loan)	13	(1)
2008	→ Droylsden (loan)	15	(1)
2008–2009	Droylsden	38	(7)
2009	Barrow	4	(0)
2009–2012	AFC Telford United	105	(11)
2012	→ Stockport County (loan)	7	(1)
2012–2013	Stockport County	43	(5)
2013–2015	Lincoln City	77	(6)
2015	→ Notts County (loan)	8	(0)
2015–2017	Wrexham	61	(8)
2016–2017	→ York City (loan)	9	(0)
2017–2022	York City	150	(29)
2022	→ Buxton (loan)	3	(1)
2022–2023	Buxton	20	(1)
2023–	Ashton United	10	(0)

International career
2009–2010	England C	5	(1)
- * Club domestic league appearances and goals as of 21:37, 10 January 2023 (UTC)

Sean Michael Newton (born 23 September 1988) is an English professional footballer who is a player/coach for Northern Premier League Premier Division side Ashton United. He has played in the Football League for Chester City and Notts County.

== Club career ==
=== Early career ===
Newton was born in Liverpool, Merseyside. A product of the club's youth system, he signed a professional contract with Chester City in May 2007. He made his first-team debut for Chester on 1 January 2008 against Grimsby Town at left-back, after being an unused substitute in previous matches.

Newton spent time on loan with Southport in the early weeks of the 2007–08 season, allowing him to gain first-team experience. This spell included him scoring from a free-kick against Tamworth. After thirteen league and four cup appearances, he returned to Chester City in November 2007.

At the end of February 2008, Newton and teammate Stephen Vaughan joined Droylsden on loan, where he enjoyed regular first-team football for the remainder of the season.

Newton was in the headlines on 24 December 2008, the day after he played in an FA Cup second-round replay against Chesterfield. Newton scored twice for Droylsden in a 2–1 victory to secure a third round tie against Ipswich Town. However, it emerged after the match that Newton was due to serve a one-game suspension on the day after picking up his fifth yellow card of the season on 9 December. Droylsden had been informed of the suspension by the Football Association on 10 December. This meant that Newton was ineligible to play in the game against Chesterfield. The FA investigated the incident with the matter dealt with by an FA Cup committee on 29 December, after which the three clubs involved were informed of the decision, which was that the club were expelled from the competition, after being found guilty of fielding an ineligible player. The club lodged an appeal, which was unsuccessful.

On 17 July 2009, Newton signed for Conference Premier club Barrow. In August 2009, Newton joined Conference North club AFC Telford United on a one-month loan, following a move in the opposite direction by Gareth Jelleyman.

=== Stockport County ===
On 22 March 2012, Newton joined Telford's Conference Premier rivals Stockport County on loan until the end of 2011–12. He joined Stockport permanently in May 2012 on a one-year contract for a nominal fee.

At the start of 2012–13, he was second in line for captaincy. Newton's speed and Freekick ability led to him scoring 6 times in his first full season for the Hatters; making him third in the top scorers list for the season. With Joe Connor and James Tunnicliffe being out of the team, Newton became the captain and was in line for the County Player of the Season award.

=== Lincoln City ===
On 14 May 2013, Newton signed for Conference Premier club Lincoln City on a two-year contract.

=== Wrexham ===
On 14 May 2015, Newton signed for National League club Wrexham, to replace the released Neil Ashton. During 2015–16, he was ever present in the league before signing a new one-year deal in May 2016. Newton was appointed captain by manager Gary Mills ahead of 2016–17, after the departure of Connor Jennings.

=== York City ===
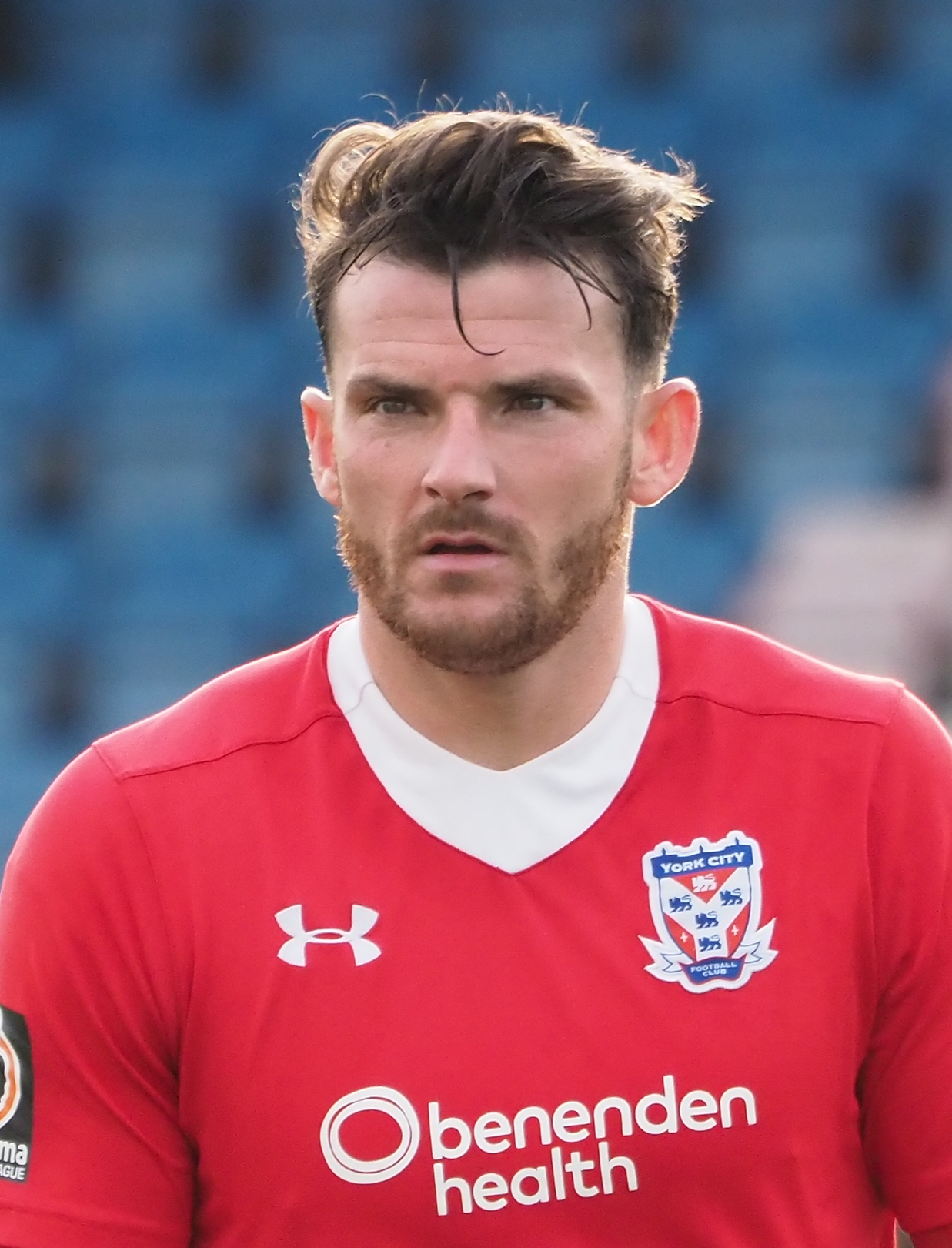
Newton playing for York City in 2018

On 28 October 2016, Newton was reunited with Mills after joining Wrexham's National League rivals York City on loan until 4 January 2017, with a view to a permanent transfer on a one-and-a-half-year contract. He debuted the following day, starting in a 2–2 home draw with Sutton United. He committed a foul that led to a penalty kick, which was converted in the 89th minute, although Dave Flett of The Press praised Newton's overall performance, saying he "looked experienced in his decision making and possessed quality on the ball". He was suspended for the following match against Eastleigh, but played regularly on his return and was used in a number of positions, including at centre-back, wing-back and up front. Newton filled in as captain for York's 2–0 home win over Worcester City in the FA Trophy first round on 10 December 2016 in Simon Heslop's absence, and Mills considered handing him the armband permanently. However, Heslop retained the armband on his return, in a 0–0 home draw with Torquay United on 17 December 2016.

Newton signed for York permanently on 6 January 2017. On 21 May 2017, he started as York beat Macclesfield Town 3–2 at Wembley Stadium in the 2017 FA Trophy Final. He was voted by supporters as the Clubman of the Year for the 2016–17 season. Newton was appointed as York captain in the summer of 2017.

Newton joined Northern Premier League Premier Division club Buxton on 4 February 2022 on loan for the remainder of the 2021–22 season. He was voted York's player of the season on 3 occasions (2017, 2019 and 2020).

In January 2023, he joined Ashton United as player / assistant manager.

== International career ==
Newton was capped five times by the England national C team, scoring one goal, from 2009 to 2010.

== Career statistics ==
As of match played 12 February 2022

Appearances and goals by club, season and competition
Club	Season	League			FA Cup		League Cup		Other		Total	
Club	Season	Division	Apps	Goals	Apps	Goals	Apps	Goals	Apps	Goals	Apps	Goals
Chester City	2007–08	League Two	2	0	—		0	0	0	0	2	0
Southport (loan)	2007–08	Conference North	13	1	3	0	—		—		16	1
Droylsden (loan)	2007–08	Conference Premier	15	1	—		—		1 (Note: Appearance in Conference League Cup)	0	16	1
Droylsden	2008–09	Conference North	38	7	8	3	—		2 (Note: One appearance in Conference League Cup, one in FA Trophy)	0	48	10
Droylsden	Total		53	8	8	3	—		3	0	64	11
Barrow	2009–10	Conference Premier	4	0	—		—		—		4	0
AFC Telford United	2009–10	Conference North	33	1	6	0	—		2 (Note: Appearance(s) in FA Trophy)	0	41	1
AFC Telford United	2010–11	Conference North	39	6	2	0	—		7 (Note: Four appearances in FA Trophy, three appearances and one goal in Conference North play-offs)	1	48	7
AFC Telford United	2011–12	Conference Premier	33	4	2	0	—		2	0	37	4
AFC Telford United	Total		105	11	10	0	—		11	1	126	12
Stockport County (loan)	2011–12	Conference Premier	7	1	—		—		—		7	1
Stockport County	2012–13	Conference Premier	43	5	2	1	—		3	0	48	6
Stockport County	Total		50	6	2	1	—		3	0	55	7
Lincoln City	2013–14	Conference Premier	45	2	4	0	—		3	0	52	2
Lincoln City	2014–15	Conference Premier	32	4	3	4	—		1	0	36	8
Lincoln City	Total		77	6	7	4	—		4	0	88	10
Notts County (loan)	2014–15	League One	8	0	—		—		—		8	0
Wrexham	2015–16	National League	46	6	1	0	—		2	1	49	7
Wrexham	2016–17	National League	15	2	2	0	—		—		17	2
Wrexham	Total		61	8	3	0	—		2	1	66	9
York City	2016–17	National League	28	2	—		—		7	1	35	3
York City	2017–18	National League North	39	9	2	1	—		2	0	43	10
York City	2018–19	National League North	32	6	4	0	—		1	0	37	6
York City	2019–20	National League North	34	4	4	1	—		2 (Note: One appearance in FA Trophy, one in National League North play-offs)	0	40	5
York City	2020–21	National League North	13	7	2	1	—		1	0	16	8
York City	2021–22	National League North	13	1	1	0	—		3	0	17	1
York City	Total		159	29	13	3	—		16	1	188	33
Buxton (loan)	2021–22	Northern Premier League; Premier Division	3	1	—		—		—		3	1
Career total			535	70	46	11	0	0	39	3	620	84

== Honours ==
AFC Telford United

- Conference North play-offs: 2011

York City

- FA Trophy: 2016–17

Individual

- York City Clubman of the Year: 2016–17, 2018–19
