= 2019 National League play-off final =

- Event: 2018–19 National League
AFC Fylde	Salford City
0	3
- Date: 11 May 2019
- Venue: Wembley Stadium, London
- Man of the Match: Lois Maynard (Salford City)
- Referee: James Oldham
- Attendance: 8,049

The 2019 National League play-off final, known as the Vanarama National League Promotion Final for sponsorship reasons, was a football match played at Wembley Stadium in London on 11 May 2019 to decide the second team to be promoted from the National League to EFL League Two for the 2019–20 season. The culmination of the 2019 National League play-offs saw Salford City beat AFC Fylde 3–0 to earn promotion alongside the National League champions Leyton Orient. The match, the first in which an EFL place had been disputed between two clubs that had never been in the EFL before, had a record low attendance.

== Match ==
=== Details ===
11 May 2019
15:00

AFC Fylde	0–3	Salford City
	Report	Dieseruvwe 15'; Piergianni 53'; Touray 61'

Wembley Stadium, London
Attendance: 8,049
Referee: James Oldham

AFC Fylde	Salford City

GK	1	Jay Lynch
RB	12	Luke Burke
CB	4	Neill Byrne
CB	5	Jordan Tunnicliffe
LB	3	Zaine Francis-Angol
CM	6	Andy Bond
CM	8	Ryan Croasdale
CM	15	Daniel Bradley
AM	10	Danny Philliskirk
FW	9	Danny Rowe
FW	30	Alex Reid
Substitutes:
GK	13	Russell Griffiths
DF	18	Timi Odusina
MF	7	James Hardy
MF	11	Tom Crawford
MF	27	Nick Haughton
Manager:
Dave Challinor

GK	1	Chris Neal
CB	5	Liam Hogan
CB	6	Carl Piergianni
CB	23	Nathan Pond
RM	2	Scott Wiseman
CM	8	Lois Maynard
CM	4	Gus Mafuta
CM	18	Danny Whitehead
LM	3	Ibou Touray
AM	15	Devonte Redmond
CF	20	Emmanuel Dieseruvwe
Substitutes:
GK	12	Max Crocombe
MF	11	Tom Walker
MF	19	Mark Shelton
FW	21	Devante Rodney
FW	30	Rory Gaffney
Manager:
Graham Alexander
