= Sean McConville =

English footballer (born 1989)

Personal information
- Full name: Sean Joseph McConville
- Date of birth: 6 March 1989 (age 37)
- Place of birth: Liverpool, England
- Height: 5 ft 11 in (1.80 m)
- Position: Midfielder

Team information
- Current team: Clitheroe (manager)

Youth career
- Burscough

Senior career*
Years	Team	Apps	(Gls)
–2009	Skelmersdale United		
2009–2011	Accrington Stanley	76	(14)
2011–2012	Stockport County	23	(4)
2012	→ Rochdale (loan)	4	(0)
2012–2013	Barrow	25	(0)
2013–2014	Stalybridge Celtic	38	(11)
2014–2015	Chester	41	(9)
2015–2024	Accrington Stanley	312	(54)
2024–	Clitheroe	15	(0)

Managerial career
- 2024–: Clitheroe
- * Club domestic league appearances and goals as of 21:01, 24 November 2025 (UTC)

Sean Joseph McConville (born 6 March 1989) is an English footballer who plays as a midfielder. He is currently manager of Northern Premier League Division One West club Clitheroe.

== Career ==
=== Accrington Stanley ===
McConville signed for Accrington Stanley in February 2009, from Skelmersdale United having previously been on trial with Stockport County. He made his debut for Accrington Stanley on 14 February 2009, away to Bournemouth in the 1–0 defeat coming on as a substitute in the 68th minute replacing John Mullin.

=== Stockport County ===
In July 2011, he signed for Stockport County. In March 2012, McConville joined League One Rochdale, on a loan deal for the remainder of the season. His contract with the club was cancelled by mutual consent in August 2012.

=== Barrow ===
On 14 September 2012, McConville joined Conference club Barrow on a one-month contract. Manager Dave Bayliss had previously tried to sign him on loan from Stockport during the summer of 2012 before his contract was cancelled.

=== Return to Accrington ===
McConville re-joined Accrington from Chester in 2015, and signed a new contract in January 2016. He signed new contracts in July 2017, July 2018, and July 2019.

On 28 April 2024, it was announced McConville will be leaving the club at the end of his contract.

=== Clitheroe ===
On 18 June 2024, it was announced McConville will join Clitheroe when his contract at Accrington Stanley expires. In his first season in charge he took the Blues to secure a 10th place finish, and in the 2025/26 season is leading the Blues through their record breaking FA Trophy run.

== Coaching career ==
In December 2024, following the departure of Jimmy Bell, McConville was appointed manager of Clitheroe, promoted from his role of assistant manager.

=== Managerial statistics ===
As of match played 24 November 2025

Managerial record by team and tenure
Team	From	To	Record					Ref
Team	From	To	P	W	D	L	Win %	Ref
Clitheroe	12 December 2024	present	47	25	7	15	53.2	
Total			47	25	7	15	53.2	

== Career statistics ==
As of end of 2023–24 season

Club statistics
Club	Season	League			FA Cup		League Cup		Other		Total	
Club	Season	Division	Apps	Goals	Apps	Goals	Apps	Goals	Apps	Goals	Apps	Goals
Accrington Stanley	2008–09	League Two	5	0	0	0	0	0	0	0	5	0
Accrington Stanley	2009–10	League Two	28	1	5	0	2	0	1 (Note: Appearances in Football League Trophy)	0	36	1
Accrington Stanley	2010–11	League Two	43	13	1	0	2	0	2 (Note: Appearances in League Two play-offs)	0	48	13
Accrington Stanley	Total		76	14	6	0	4	0	3	0	89	14
Stockport County	2011–12	Conference Premier	23	4	0	0	—		2 (Note: Appearances in FA Trophy)	2	25	6
Rochdale (loan)	2011–12	League One	4	0	0	0	0	0	0	0	4	0
Barrow	2012–13	Conference Premier	25	0	3	0	—		5	1	33	1
Stalybridge Celtic	2013–14	Conference North	38	11	1	1	—		4 (Note: Two appearances in FA Trophy, two appearances and two goals in Cheshire Senior Cup)	2	43	14
Chester	2014–15	Conference Premier	41	9	4	2	—		2	0	47	11
Accrington Stanley	2015–16	League Two	42	5	2	1	1	0	2 (Note: One appearance in Football League Trophy, one appearance in League Two play-offs)	0	47	6
Accrington Stanley	2016–17	League Two	41	5	4	1	2	0	3 (Note: Appearance(s) in EFL Trophy)	0	50	6
Accrington Stanley	2017–18	League Two	43	12	2	1	2	0	1	0	48	13
Accrington Stanley	2018–19	League One	45	15	4	0	1	0	3	0	53	15
Accrington Stanley	2019–20	League One	18	5	1	0	1	0	1	1	21	6
Accrington Stanley	2020–21	League One	31	1	0	0	0	0	1	0	32	1
Accrington Stanley	2021–22	League One	46	4	0	0	1	0	1	0	48	4
Accrington Stanley	2022–23	League One	41	5	4	0	1	0	5	1	51	6
Accrington Stanley	2023–24	League Two	5	2	0	0	0	0	1	0	6	2
Accrington Stanley	Total		312	54	17	3	9	0	18	2	356	59
Clitheroe	2024–25	NPL Division One West	9	0	1	0	0	0	3	0	13	0
Clitheroe	2025–26	NPL Division One West	6	0	0	0	0	0	0	0	6	0
Clitheroe	Total		15	0	1	0	0	0	3	0	19	0
Career total			534	92	32	6	13	0	37	7	616	105

== Honours ==
Accrington Stanley

- EFL League Two: 2017–18

Individual

- PFA Team of the Year: 2017–18 League Two
