= John Miles (footballer) =

English footballer (born 1981)

Personal information
- Full name: John Francis Miles
- Date of birth: 28 September 1981 (age 45)
- Place of birth: Walton, England
- Height: 5 ft 10 in (1.78 m)
- Position: Forward

Youth career
- 1999–2001: Liverpool

Senior career*
Years	Team	Apps	(Gls)
2001–2002	Liverpool	0	(0)
2002	Stoke City	1	(0)
2002–2003	Crewe Alexandra	5	(1)
2003	→ Macclesfield Town	8	(4)
2003–2007	Macclesfield Town	114	(17)
2007–2010	Accrington Stanley	95	(6)
2008	→ Milton Keynes Dons (loan)	12	(0)
2010–2011	Fleetwood Town	8	(0)
2011	→ Droylsden (loan)	12	(2)
2011–2012	Stockport County	14	(0)
2012	Altrincham	11	(0)
2012–2013	Warrington Town	9	(1)
2013–2014	Cammell Laird		
Total		289	(32)
- * Club domestic league appearances and goals

John Francis Miles (born 28 September 1981) is an English footballer.

== Career ==
=== Liverpool ===
Miles, who is a forward, was a product of the Liverpool Academy, and progressed as far as the reserve team, but in 2002 he was told he had no future at the club.

=== Stoke City ===
He joined Stoke City in March 2002, with a short-term contract until the end of the season. He only made one substitute appearance for the club in April replacing Bjarni Guðjónsson in a league match against Bristol City. He was released by the club in the summer.

=== Crewe Alexandra ===
He subsequently moved to Crewe Alexandra, initially on a monthly contract before signing on a season-long deal in October. He made his club debut in August against Colchester. He scored his only goal for Crewe on New Year's Day in 2003 in a 2–0 win against Mansfield Town. In total, he played nine games for Crewe, but struggled to establish himself in the first-team.

==== Macclesfield Town (loan) ====
In March 2003 he was loaned out to Macclesfield Town. He scored four goals in eight games during his loan spell, including scoring on his club debut against Kidderminster Harriers and twice in an away victory over Shrewsbury Town, where he scored the winning goal during injury time.

=== Macclesfield Town ===
He joined Macclesfield Town in a permanent move in May 2003 after a successful trial and he remained at Macclesfield Town until May 2007.

=== Accrington Stanley ===
Although offered a new deal at Macclesfield Town in the summer of 2007, he rejected the contract and opted to move to instead to league two rivals Accrington Stanley on a free transfer.

==== MK Dons (loan) ====
On 24 January 2008 it was confirmed he had completed a loan move to Milton Keynes Dons with a view to a permanent deal, re-uniting with his former Macclesfield Town boss Paul Ince, though after 12 games and no goals his loan spell ended and he returned to Accrington Stanley. On his return from loan he still has one year left on his contract, but over the subsequent season he played regularly and in June 2009 re-signed for the club on a one-year contract extension.

=== Fleetwood Town ===
In May 2010 he was offered a new contract by Stanley but in June he signed for newly promoted Conference National side Fleetwood Town.

==== Droylsden (loan) ====
During his time with Fleetwood he went on loan to Droylsden He was not offered a new contract by Fleetwood at the end of the season and was released, along with a number of other players.

=== Stockport County ===
In July 2011 he joined Stockport County but was released by the club on 31 January 2012.

=== Altrincham ===
His next move was to join Altrincham a few days later. He was named man of the match on his club debut in February. He was released by the club at the end of the season having made 11 first-team appearances.

=== Warrington Town ===
In September 2012 he joined Warrington Town, making his debut in a 6–1 away victory over New Mills and scoring on his home debut three days later as they beat Curzon Ashton 3–2.

== Career statistics ==
Appearances and goals by club, season and competition
Club	Season	League			FA Cup		League Cup		Other^{[A]}		Total	
Club	Season	Division	Apps	Goals	Apps	Goals	Apps	Goals	Apps	Goals	Apps	Goals
Stoke City	2001–02	Second Division	1	0	0	0	0	0	0	0	1	0
Crewe Alexandra	2002–03	Second Division	5	1	2	0	1	0	2	0	10	1
Macclesfield Town	2002–03	Third Division	8	4	0	0	0	0	0	0	8	4
Macclesfield Town	2003–04	Third Division	29	6	2	1	1	0	1	0	33	7
Macclesfield Town	2004–05	League Two	30	3	3	0	0	0	3	0	36	3
Macclesfield Town	2005–06	League Two	25	4	0	0	2	0	2	0	29	4
Macclesfield Town	2006–07	League Two	30	4	1	0	1	0	0	0	32	4
Macclesfield Town	Total		122	21	6	1	4	0	6	0	138	22
Accrington Stanley	2007–08	League Two	16	0	1	0	1	0	1	0	19	0
Accrington Stanley	2008–09	League Two	43	3	2	0	1	0	1	0	47	3
Accrington Stanley	2009–10	League Two	36	3	4	1	2	0	3	0	45	4
Accrington Stanley	Total		95	6	7	1	4	0	5	0	111	7
Milton Keynes Dons (loan)	2007–08	League Two	12	0	0	0	0	0	0	0	12	0
Fleetwood Town	2010–11	Conference National	8	0	2	0	0	0	0	0	10	0
Stockport County	2011–12	Conference National	14	0	0	0	0	0	0	0	14	0
Career total			257	28	17	2	9	0	13	0	296	30

A. The "Other" column constitutes appearances and goals in the Football League Trophy.

== Honours ==
Milton Keynes Dons

- Football League Two: 2007–08
