= Euan Holden =

Scottish-American soccer player

Personal information
- Date of birth: 2 February 1988 (age 38)
- Place of birth: Aberdeen, Scotland
- Positions: Defender; central midfielder

College career
| Years | Team | Apps | (Gls) |
| 2006–2007 | Connecticut Huskies | 36 | (2) |
| 2008–2009 | New Mexico Lobos | 28 | (1) |

Senior career*
| Years | Team | Apps | (Gls) |
| 2008 | Austin Aztex U23 | 6 | (0) |
| 2010 | Vejle BK | 2 | (0) |
| 2010–2011 | FC Hjørring | 2 | (0) |
| 2011–2013 | Stockport County | 34 | (1) |
| 2013–2014 | Bury | 3 | (0) |
| 2024 | Des Moines Menace | 0 | (0) |
| Total | | 47 | (1) |
- * Club domestic league appearances and goals

Euan Holden (born 2 February 1988) is a Scottish-American former professional soccer player who played as a defender or midfielder.

== Career ==
Holden began his career at the University of Connecticut, where he made 36 appearances and scored two goals in two seasons with the Huskies before transferring to the University of New Mexico, where he made 28 appearances and scored one goal in the last two seasons of his college career. He also spent the summer of 2008 with Austin Aztex U23 in the USL Premier Development League.

On 14 January 2010, Holden was drafted in the fourth round (62nd overall) of the 2010 MLS SuperDraft by Houston Dynamo.

However, Holden elected to continue his career in Europe as he joined Danish sides Vejle and FC Hjørring before joining English club Stockport County in 2010 and then joined Bury in February 2013. He made his professional debut on 27 April 2013 in a 3–2 victory against Yeovil Town.

On 16 January 2014, Holden had his contract cancelled at Bury.

Holden joined Des Moines Menace for the 2024 U.S. Open Cup.

== Personal life ==
Holden's brother Stuart is also a former professional footballer. In July 2018, Holden became the subject of a viral Twitter thread when his meeting of a woman on a plane was documented by a couple sitting in the row behind.
