= Cameron Darkwah =

English footballer (born 1992)

Personal information
- Date of birth: 2 September 1992 (age 34)
- Place of birth: Manchester, England
- Positions: Midfielder; striker

Youth career
- 2005–2009: Stockport County

Senior career*
Years	Team	Apps	(Gls)
2009–2012	Stockport County	18	(2)
2011	→ Mossley (loan)	8	(7)
2012	→ FC Halifax Town (loan)	7	(1)
2012	→ Colwyn Bay (loan)	6	(0)
2013	Ilkeston	1	(0)
2013	Chorley	10	(1)
2013–2014	Colwyn Bay	32	(5)
2017	Stockport Town		
2019–2022	Abbey Hey		
2022	Stalybridge Celtic	9	(0)
2024–2025	West Didsbury & Chorlton		
- * Club domestic league appearances and goals as of 01:54, 25 September 2015 (UTC)

Cameron Darkwah (born 2 September 1992) is an English footballer who plays as a midfielder for Stalybridge Celtic.

== Club career ==
=== Stockport County ===
Born in Miles Platting, Manchester, Darkwah made his debut for Stockport County on 16 October 2010, coming on as a substitute as part of the 2–1 victory over Barnet. In May 2011, he agreed a new one-year deal with the club.

In August 2011, he joined Mossley on loan scoring a hat-trick in a 6–2 win over Ossett Albion. He followed that up with the only goal of the game against Garforth and another strike in their 2–1 win over Salford. His loan was extended at the end of the initial loan period, having scored five goals in five matches.

In January 2012, he joined FC Halifax Town for his second loan period of the season. On his debut for the Shaymen, he came off the bench and scored an equalising goal in the 2–1 win against Worcester City at The Shay. With his loan deal coming towards and end, Darkwah was sent off away at Eastwood Town in a 2–2 draw for kicking out at an opposition player.

He played again for Stockport on his return from loan. He was offered a further deal by the club in May 2012. On 23 August, he stated he will be leaving the club after rejecting another contract offer. On 31 August, he accepted a new deal, deciding to remain with the club.

On 26 September, he moved to Colwyn Bay on loan for an initial one-month period where he made his club debut on 29 September against Brackley Town. His loan period was later extended until the end of the year.

Cameron signed a deal for Garry Flitcroft at Chorley on 6 February 2013 and played for the club until June 2013, before returning to Colwyn Bay.

In 2017 he played for Stockport Town.

On 30 June 2022, Darkwah joined Stalybridge Celtic, making nine lague appearances for the club.

== Career statistics ==
As of 27 April 2014

Appearances and goals by club, season and competition
Club	Season	League			FA Cup		Other		Total	
Club	Season	Division	Apps	Goals	Apps	Goals	Apps	Goals	Apps	Goals
Stockport County	2010–11	League Two	6	0	1	0	1 (Note: Appearance(s) in Football League Trophy)	0	8	0
Stockport County	2011–12	Conference Premier	7	2	1	0	1 (Note: Appearance(s) in FA Trophy)	0	9	2
Stockport County	2012–13	Conference Premier	5	0	0	0	0	0	4	0
Stockport County	Total		18	2	2	0	2	0	22	2
Mossley (loan)	2011–12	Northern Premier League Division One North	8	7	0	0	0	0	8	7
FC Halifax Town (loan)	2011–12	Conference North	7	1	—		—		7	1
Colwyn Bay (loan)	2012–13	Conference North	6	0	0	0	0	0	6	0
Ilkeston	2012–13	Northern Premier League Premier Division	1	0	—		0	0	1	0
Chorley	2012–13	Northern Premier League Premier Division	10	1	—		—		10	1
Colwyn Bay	2013–14	Conference North	32	5	1	0	0	0	33	5
Career total			82	16	3	0	2	0	87	16
