= Jordan Rose =

English footballer

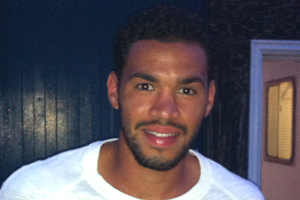
- Rose in 2013

Personal information
- Date of birth: 22 November 1989 (age 36)
- Place of birth: Southampton, England
- Position: Defender

Team information
- Current team: Winchester City

Youth career
- Southampton
- Stade Malherbe Caen
- 2006–2008: Bournemouth

Senior career*
| Years | Team | Apps | (Gls) |
| 2008 | Salisbury City | | |
| 2008 | Bashley | 5 | (0) |
| 2008–2009 | Brockenhurst | | |
| 2009–2010 | Weymouth | 17 | (1) |
| 2010 | Paulton Rovers | 9 | (0) |
| 2010 | Bath City | | |
| 2010–2011 | Stockport County | 15 | (0) |
| 2011 | Eastleigh | 1 | (0) |
| 2011 | Hereford United | 0 | (0) |
| 2012 | Hayes & Yeading | 4 | (0) |
| 2012 | Stockport County | 10 | (2) |
| 2012–2013 | A.F.C. Telford United | 34 | (0) |
| 2013 | → Alfreton Town (loan) | 9 | (1) |
| 2013–2014 | Tamworth | 4 | (0) |
| 2014–2016 | Whitehawk | 27 | (6) |
| 2016 | Hemel Hempstead Town | 5 | (0) |
| 2016 | Havant & Waterlooville | 45 | (2) |
| 2017 | → Weymouth (loan) | 6 | (4) |
| 2018 | → Weymouth (loan) | 3 | (0) |
| 2019 | Weymouth | 2 | (0) |
| 2019 | → Eastbourne Borough (loan) | 1 | (0) |
| 2019–2020 | Blackfield & Langley | 11 | (0) |
| 2020–2021 | Gosport Borough | 4 | (0) |
| 2021–2022 | Farnborough | 18 | (1) |
| 2022 | Salisbury | 2 | (0) |
| 2022–2023 | Wimborne Town | 15 | (1) |
| 2023 | Sholing | 5 | (2) |
| 2023– | Winchester City | 5 | (1) |
- * Club domestic league appearances and goals as of 15:47, 30 September 2023 (UTC)

Jordan Rose (born 22 November 1989) is an English footballer who plays as a defender for Winchester City.

== Playing career ==
Rose started his career, aged 12, at Southampton before moving to France with his family and playing youth football for Stade Malherbe Caen. On his return to England he undertook a two-year scholarship with Bournemouth and being released in May 2008.

He then had spells with non-League sides Salisbury City, Bashley, Brockenhurst and Weymouth. He left Weymouth in March 2010, and joined Paulton Rovers, before later signing dual registration papers with the club and Bath City.

He then signed with the Nike Academy, and trained again with Weymouth, before signing professional terms with Stockport County in July 2010 after impressing on trial.

Rose made his first team debut for Stockport coming on as 29th-minute substitute in the first half in a game against Lincoln City on 23 October 2010. His manager Paul Simpson said of his debut: "We've got a young kid in Jordan Rose who comes in for his debut and I thought he did very well. He was going to play on Tuesday night against Tranmere anyway so he's got in earlier than I wanted, but I thought he did very well."

He did then start his first match for the club on 26 October in a Football League Trophy match against Tranmere Rovers. Rose was awarded "Supporters Young Player of the Year" and "Club Young Player of the Year" for stockport county after a successful season with the club.

Rose started the season with Conference South side Eastleigh but left after only one appearance to join Hereford United. However, his stay with the Bulls was a short one as he left after just a week and without making an appearance due to picking up an injury in a reserve game. Rose joined Hayes & Yeading United at the start of the transfer window in January 2012, but was released after making just four appearances.

On 23 June 2012, Rose got a call from Stockport manager Jim Gannon who offered him the chance to re-sign for the club he left at the end of the 2010–11 season on a non-contract basis and handed him his second debut in the 1–0 win against Wrexham at Edgeley Park just two days later, Jordan's clean sheet earned him the Man of The Match award for the game.

He left the club in May upon the expiration of his deal with the club.

Following his release he joined A.F.C. Telford United on non-contract terms. After four matches with the club he signed contract terms. It was announced on 8 January 2013 that Telford rejected a bid from Alfreton Town with the Telford chairman Lee Carter stating that he is a big part in the team. On 12 March he joined Alfreton on loan until the end of the season. He was released by the club on 2 May 2013.

On 12 July 2019, after two seasons with Havant & Waterlooville, Rose joined Weymouth.

On 16 July 2021, Rose joined Farnborough following spells with Blackfield & Langley and Gosport Borough.

On 24 March 2022, Rose joined fellow Southern League Premier Division South side, Salisbury after featuring twenty-six times and scoring once in all competitions for Farnborough. Rose joined Wimborne Town in June 2022. Ahead of the 2023–24 campaign, Rose joined Winchester City following a short-term spell with Sholing.
