= The Non-League Paper =

English sports paper

- Front cover on 19 December 2010
- Type: Weekly non-League football newspaper
- Format: Tabloid
- Founder: David Emery
- Publisher: The Football Paper Ltd.
- Founded: 1999
- Language: English
- Headquarters: Wimbledon, London
- Sister newspapers: The League Paper; The Rugby Paper; The Cricket Paper; The Racing Paper
- ISSN: 1755-1544
- Website: www.thenonleaguefootballpaper.com

The Non-League Paper is a weekly English sports paper based on non-League football. It is published every Sunday. For a short while a midweek edition was also published.

The publication features match reports from the previous day's top four levels of English non-league football with round-ups of step five divisions. Results and tables from steps 5 and 6 are also featured as are the results and a selection of tables from step 7. A round-up of football in Wales is included and the scores from senior Scottish non-league football are featured in the results section. A results round-up from the previous week's midweek matches is also included. In addition, there are a number of pages devoted to news from the non-league scene. During the close season the Paper becomes more feature-based, with reviews of the top leagues and more feature articles.

The Paper's owners later launched a sister title covering the Football League, called the League Paper.

== See also ==
- List of British newspapers
- List of newspapers (by country)
