= Mark Lynch (English footballer) =

English footballer

Personal information
- Full name: Mark John Lynch
- Date of birth: 2 September 1981 (age 45)
- Place of birth: Manchester, England
- Height: 1.83 m (6 ft 0 in)
- Position: Right-back

Youth career
- 1998–2001: Manchester United

Senior career*
Years	Team	Apps	(Gls)
2001–2004	Manchester United	0	(0)
2001–2002	→ St Johnstone (loan)	20	(0)
2004–2005	Sunderland	11	(0)
2005–2006	Hull City	16	(0)
2006–2008	Yeovil Town	31	(0)
2008–2010	Rotherham United	31	(2)
2010–2012	Stockport County	37	(0)
2012	Altrincham	7	(0)
Total		153	(2)
- * Club domestic league appearances and goals

Mark John Lynch (born 2 September 1981) is an English former professional footballer who played as a right-back. He began his career with Manchester United and spent most of the 2001–02 season on loan with Scottish club St Johnstone, but failed to break into the Manchester United first team on a regular basis. He went on to play for Sunderland, Hull City, Yeovil Town, Rotherham United, Stockport County and Altrincham before retiring from professional football in 2012.

== Career ==
Born in Manchester, Lynch began his career with Manchester United. To gain first-team experience, he joined Scottish Premier League side St Johnstone on loan in October 2001 and made 20 appearances for the club. He made one senior appearance for Manchester United, against Deportivo de La Coruña in the UEFA Champions League in March 2003, in which he scored an own goal. In July 2004, Lynch moved to Sunderland on a free transfer. He made 11 appearances during the 2004–05 season and was allowed to leave in June 2005.

On 14 June 2005, Lynch signed for Championship club Hull City on a free transfer. He suffered a knee injury in the first minute of his Hull City debut in August 2005 against Queens Park Rangers, and in his first game back against Coventry City he was sent off. He made 15 further appearances for Hull in the 2005–06 season, the last of which was in January, and at the end of the season he was made available for transfer by manager Peter Taylor.

In August 2006, Lynch moved to Yeovil Town on loan but then signed on a permanent deal before the transfer deadline. He was released in May 2008.

Lynch signed a two-year deal Rotherham United on 27 May 2008. He made his Rotherham United debut against Lincoln City, and scored twice on his third appearance for the club against Morecambe.

On 14 July 2010, he signed for Stockport County, but was released on 31 January 2012. He subsequently joined Altrincham, but was released by the club at the end of the season after making seven first-team appearances.

== Career statistics ==
Appearances and goals by club, season and competition
Club	Season	League			FA Cup		League Cup		Other		Total	
Club	Season	Division	Apps	Goals	Apps	Goals	Apps	Goals	Apps	Goals	Apps	Goals
Manchester United	2001–02	Premier League	0	0	0	0	0	0	0	0	0	0
Manchester United	2002–03	Premier League	0	0	0	0	0	0	1 (Note: Appearance(s) in Champions League)	0	1	0
Manchester United	2003–04	Premier League	0	0	0	0	0	0	0	0	0	0
Manchester United total			0	0	0	0	0	0	1	0	1	0
→ St Johnstone (loan)	2001–02	Scottish Premier League	20	0	0	0	0	0	0	0	20	0
St Johnstone total			20	0	0	0	0	0	0	0	20	0
Sunderland	2004–05	Championship	11	0	0	0	2	0	0	0	13	0
Sunderland total			11	0	0	0	2	0	0	0	13	0
Hull City	2005–06	Championship	16	0	1	0	0	0	0	0	17	0
Hull City total			16	0	1	0	0	0	0	0	17	0
Yeovil Town	2006–07	League One	17	0	1	0	1	0	2 (Note: 1 appearance(s) in Football League Trophy) (Note: 1 appearance(s) in League One play-offs)	0	21	0
Yeovil Town	2007–08	League One	14	0	1	0	1	0	1 (Note: Appearance(s) in Football League Trophy)	0	17	0
Yeovil Town total			31	0	2	0	2	0	3	0	38	0
Rotherham United	2008–09	League Two	8	2	0	0	2	0	0	0	10	2
Rotherham United	2009–10	League Two	23	0	2	0	0	0	3 (Note: Appearance(s) in League Two play-offs)	0	28	0
Rotherham United total			31	2	2	0	2	0	3	0	38	2
Stockport County	2010–11	League Two	31	0	2	0	1	0	1	0	35	0
Stockport County	2011–12	Conference Premier	6	0	1	0	0	0	0	0	7	0
Stockport County total			37	0	3	0	1	0	1	0	42	0
Altrincham	2011–12	Conference North	7	0	0	0	0	0	0	0	7	0
Altrincham total			7	0	0	0	0	0	0	0	7	0
Career total			153	2	8	0	7	0	8	0	176	2
