= Julian Owusu-Bekoe =

Association football player (born 1989)

Personal information
- Full name: Julian Nana Ayisi Owusu-Bekoe
- Date of birth: 10 May 1989 (age 37)
- Place of birth: Tooting, England
- Position: Forward

Youth career
- Predators

Senior career*
Years	Team	Apps	(Gls)
2008–2009	Eleven Wise		
2009–2010	Merstham	10	(23)
2010	Berekum Chelsea		
2011	Hayes & Yeading United	16	(12)
2011	Burnham	8	(8)
2012–2013	Hayes & Yeading United	17	(3)
2014–2015	Basingstoke Town	3	(0)
- * Club domestic league appearances and goals

Julian Owusu-Bekoe (born 10 May 1989) is a former footballer who played as a forward.

== Education ==
Owusu-Bekoe was born in Tooting. He attended St.Boniface Primary school, Richmond College and Wimbledon College before attending London School of Business and Management in 2014 for a BSc in Business and Management. In 2015, he became the first Student President at London School of Business and Management where he led the student body till the summer of 2017.

== Club career ==
Owusu-Bekoe began his career at Predators F.C. as a youngster, in 2006 he joined Park View, and won there the Young Player of the Year Award for 2007. He was given a two-week trial at SBV Excelsior on 20 January 2007 which was later extended by a further month.

In 2008, he returned to Ghana and signed a one-year contract with Eleven Wise, in the summer of 2009 he signed for English Isthmian League Division One South side, Merstham. In December 2010, Owusu-Bekoe signed a three-year contract with Glo Premier League side Berekum Chelsea where he won his first league title with the Berekum Based club. His contract was cancelled at the end of the season.

On 4 August 2011, Owusu-Bekoe joined Conference National side Hayes & Yeading United. He subsequently signed for Burnham before rejoining Hayes & Yeading in January 2012.

In 2014, however, he signed for Basingstoke Town.

== International career ==
Owusu-Bekoe joined the Ghana U17 national team camp in mid-October 2006. He scored two goals in two friendly matches—with Division One side Fairpoint F.C. and Mighty Jets.

== Later life ==
Owusu-Bekoe is the co-founder of the London/Accra-based startup, Zuberi.

== Honours ==
- 2007: Young Player of the Year Award
