= Nick Chadwick =

English footballer

Personal information
- Full name: Nicholas Gerald Chadwick
- Date of birth: 26 October 1982 (age 44)
- Place of birth: Stoke On Trent, England
- Height: 6 ft 0 in (1.83 m)
- Position: Forward

Youth career
- 1998–2001: Everton

Senior career*
| Years | Team | Apps | (Gls) |
| 2001–2005 | Everton | 14 | (3) |
| 2003 | → Derby County (loan) | 6 | (0) |
| 2003–2004 | → Millwall (loan) | 15 | (4) |
| 2005–2008 | Plymouth Argyle | 77 | (10) |
| 2008–2009 | Hereford United | 10 | (1) |
| 2009 | Shrewsbury Town | 15 | (2) |
| 2009–2010 | Chester City^{1} | x | (x) |
| 2010–2011 | Barrow | 35 | (11) |
| 2011–2012 | Stockport County | 19 | (7) |
| 2011–2012 | → Plymouth Argyle (loan) | 6 | (3) |
| 2012–2014 | Plymouth Argyle | 44 | (3) |
| 2013–2014 | → Tamworth (loan) | 8 | (3) |
| 2014 | Tamworth | 21 | (5) |
| Total | | 270 | (52) |

Managerial career
- 2014–2016: Blackburn Rovers U15 (coach)
- 2016–2020: Wigan Athletic U18 (Coach)
- 2020–2021: AFC Fylde (stand-in)
- 2022: AFC Fylde (caretaker manager)
- * Club domestic league appearances and goals

Nicholas Gerald Chadwick (born 26 October 1982) is an English former professional footballer. He played as a forward in the Premier League for Everton, before going on to play in the Football League for Derby County, Millwall, Hereford United, Shrewsbury Town and most predominantly, Plymouth Argyle.

== Playing career ==
=== Everton ===
Chadwick started his career as a promising youth player at Everton, scoring 48 goals in 75 appearances in his first three seasons in the junior ranks. He made his senior debut against Crystal Palace at the age of 18, and made his Premier League debut on 22 September 2001 against Sunderland. Chadwick was highly regarded at Everton and tipped for a big future in the game, but ultimately failed to secure a regular first team place at Goodison Park. He scored three league goals for Everton, all of which came in April 2002 against Bolton, Leicester and Blackburn. After this burst of scoring in the league, he only scored in cup games for Everton, scoring in the League Cup against Stockport and Bristol City and in the FA Cup against Plymouth. He had loan spells at Derby County and Millwall and featured regularly for the reserves, scoring 36 goals in 54 appearances in his last four seasons at Everton. During his loan spell at Millwall they made it to the 2004 FA Cup Final. Chadwick was an unused substitute during their semi-final triumph over Sunderland, but the terms of his loan spell meant he had to return to his parent club just three days before the final itself. Having failed to secure a regular first team place at Everton, he was transferred to Plymouth Argyle for a fee of £250,000 early in 2005.

=== Plymouth Argyle ===
Despite regular appearances in the Plymouth Argyle first team, his goal scoring tally was less than prolific. However, he scored Argyle's fastest ever goal after 11 seconds against Crystal Palace in a Championship match on 17 December 2005.

It was announced in April 2008 that Chadwick, along with five other Argyle players, were going to be released when their contracts expired in June.

=== Hereford United ===
After trials with Walsall and Cheltenham Town, Chadwick signed for League One side Hereford United on 10 September 2008. He went on to score a penalty on his debut for the Bulls, against Scunthorpe United. On 8 January 2009 Hereford decided against renewing his contract and he was subsequently released.

=== Shrewsbury Town ===
On 9 January 2009, Chadwick signed for Shrewsbury Town on a contract until the end of the season. He was released on 25 May after Shrewsbury lost in the League Two Play-Off final against Gillingham. He went on to have a trial at Darlington in the pre-season, but failed to secure a move.

=== Non-league ===
On 14 August 2009, Chadwick signed for Chester City. The following day he made his debut for his new club as a substitute and scored in a 4–2 loss to Cambridge United. However, Chester's season was quickly hit by financial problems and Chadwick moved on to fellow Conference National team Barrow in January 2010, having not been paid by Chester since November. His first goals for Barrow came in a game against Ebbsfleet when he scored a hat trick in a 4–1 win on 27 February 2010. Chadwick scored 11 goals in 35 league games for Barrow, but was restricted to 15 games during the 2010–11 season because of a knee injury. He was one of five players released by the club in May 2011.

=== Stockport County ===
Chadwick joined Stockport County on a free transfer in July, having spent pre-season with the club on trial. He began the new season as the club's first-choice forward under the management of Dietmar Hamann, scoring seven goals in 19 games before Hamann resigned and was replaced by former Stockport manager Jim Gannon. With a new manager in place and the club looking to reduce their wage bill, Chadwick returned to Plymouth Argyle on loan until January 2012.

==== Plymouth Argyle loan ====
In his first game since returning to the club, he scored their second goal in a 4–1 win against Northampton Town on 26 November 2011. Chadwick scored two goals in December, against Hereford United and Bristol Rovers, as the team put together a five-match unbeaten run.

=== Return to Plymouth ===
Having made six appearances during his loan spell, he rejoined Plymouth permanently on 4 January 2012 on a free transfer. "I'm delighted to have signed," said Chadwick, who agreed an 18-month contract. "When I first came back, I said I would see how it goes and it's gone really well. I'm delighted the club has been able to facilitate me and my family coming down. He was given a six-match suspension by the Football Association in January 2013 for two incidents in a match with Port Vale, the second of which he was sent-off for.

Chadwick returned to the side at the end of February and made eight more appearances to finish the season with a tally of two goals in 32 games. His contract was automatically extended until June 2014 at the end of the campaign, owing to a clause in the original deal, but he was transfer-listed by Argyle manager John Sheridan in the summer. Chadwick required knee surgery in July that kept him sidelined for two months.

=== Tamworth ===
Having returned to full training, he joined Conference Premier side Tamworth on loan until January 2014. Chadwick made 12 appearances for Tamworth in that time and scored six goals, including three in FA Cup wins against Solihull Moors and Cheltenham Town. Upon completion of the loan his contract with Plymouth Argyle was cancelled by mutual consent, and he signed for Tamworth on a free transfer.

Chadwick left Tamworth when they were relegated at the end of the 2014–15 season, and subsequently retired from playing. He then had a youth coaching role at U-18 level with Wigan Athletic.

== Coaching career ==
In July 2020, Chadwick joined recently relegated National League North club AFC Fylde in the role of assistant manager. In October 2020, manager Jim Bentley, a former teammate of Chadwick, stepped away from the club in order to have heart bypass surgery, Chadwick being placed in temporary charge of the club. Following the sacking of Bentley in March 2022, Chadwick was again placed in temporary charge. Chadwick oversaw one match in charge, a 2–0 victory over Bradford (Park Avenue), before the club announced the permanent appointment of James Rowe as manager, Chadwick subsequently leaving the club.

In September 2022, he re-united with Bentley after being appointed assistant manager at League Two side Rochdale.

On 1st September 2025, Nick joined Everton as the individual development lead coach, to ensure clear and individual focus on players.

== Career statistics ==
Appearances and goals by club, season and competition
| Club | Season | League | | | FA Cup | | League Cup | | Other (Note: Includes Football League Trophy and FA Trophy) | | Total | |
| Club | Season | Division | Apps | Goals | Apps | Goals | Apps | Goals | Apps | Goals | Apps | Goals |
|---|---|---|---|---|---|---|---|---|---|---|---|---|
| Everton | 1999–00 | Premier League | 0 | 0 | 0 | 0 | 0 | 0 | 0 | 0 | 0 | 0 |
| Everton | 2000–01 | Premier League | 0 | 0 | 0 | 0 | 0 | 0 | 0 | 0 | 0 | 0 |
| Everton | 2001–02 | Premier League | 9 | 3 | 1 | 0 | 1 | 0 | 0 | 0 | 11 | 3 |
| Everton | 2002–03 | Premier League | 1 | 0 | 0 | 0 | 0 | 0 | 0 | 0 | 1 | 0 |
| Everton | 2003–04 | Premier League | 3 | 0 | 0 | 0 | 1 | 1 | 0 | 0 | 4 | 1 |
| Everton | 2004–05 | Premier League | 1 | 0 | 2 | 1 | 2 | 1 | 0 | 0 | 5 | 2 |
| Everton | Total | | 14 | 3 | 3 | 1 | 4 | 2 | 0 | 0 | 21 | 6 |
| Derby County (loan) | 2002–03 | Division One | 6 | 0 | 0 | 0 | 0 | 0 | 0 | 0 | 6 | 0 |
| Millwall (loan) | 2003–04 | Division One | 15 | 4 | 0 | 0 | 0 | 0 | 0 | 0 | 15 | 4 |
| Plymouth Argyle | 2004–05 | Championship | 15 | 1 | 0 | 0 | 0 | 0 | 0 | 0 | 15 | 1 |
| Plymouth Argyle | 2005–06 | Championship | 37 | 5 | 0 | 0 | 1 | 0 | 0 | 0 | 38 | 6 |
| Plymouth Argyle | 2006–07 | Championship | 16 | 2 | 0 | 0 | 1 | 0 | 0 | 0 | 17 | 2 |
| Plymouth Argyle | 2007–08 | Championship | 9 | 2 | 1 | 0 | 3 | 0 | 0 | 0 | 13 | 2 |
| Plymouth Argyle | Total | | 77 | 10 | 1 | 0 | 5 | 0 | 0 | 0 | 86 | 11 |
| Hereford United | 2008–09 | League One | 10 | 1 | 1 | 0 | 0 | 0 | 1 | 0 | 12 | 1 |
| Shrewsbury Town | 2008–09 | League Two | 18 | 2 | 0 | 0 | 0 | 0 | 0 | 0 | 18 | 2 |
| Chester City | 2009–10 | Conference National (Note: The statistics of every player who played for Chester City during the 2009–10 season were expunged after the club was expelled from the Football Conference for breaking league rules. Chadwick scored seven goals in 22 league appearances for Chester City that season.) | ~~22~~ | ~~7~~ | 0 | 0 | 0 | 0 | 1 | 0 | 1 | 0 |
| Barrow | 2009–10 | Conference National | 20 | 8 | 0 | 0 | 0 | 0 | 0 | 0 | 20 | 8 |
| Barrow | 2010–11 | Conference National | 15 | 3 | 1 | 0 | 0 | 0 | 1 | 0 | 17 | 3 |
| Barrow | Total | | 35 | 11 | 1 | 0 | 0 | 0 | 1 | 0 | 37 | 11 |
| Stockport County | 2011–12 | Conference National | 19 | 7 | 0 | 0 | 0 | 0 | 0 | 0 | 19 | 7 |
| Plymouth Argyle (loan) | 2011–12 | League Two | 22 | 5 | 0 | 0 | 0 | 0 | 0 | 0 | 22 | 5 |
| Career total | | | 216 | 43 | 6 | 1 | 9 | 2 | 3 | 0 | 234 | 47 |

Sporting positions
| Preceded by Danny Swailes | Stockport County captain 2011 | Succeeded by Danny O'Donnell |
