= Ryan Fraughan =

English footballer (born 1991)

Personal information
- Date of birth: 11 February 1991 (age 35)
- Place of birth: Liverpool, England
- Position: Midfielder

Youth career
- 2005–2008: Tranmere Rovers

Senior career*
Years	Team	Apps	(Gls)
2008–2011	Tranmere Rovers	19	(0)
2010	→ Aberystwyth Town (loan)	16	(3)
2011–2012	Stockport County	10	(0)
2012	→ The New Saints (loan)	10	(3)
2012–2015	The New Saints	54	(9)
2015	→ Connah's Quay Nomads (loan)	11	(3)
2015–2017	Airbus UK Broughton	38	(2)
- * Club domestic league appearances and goals as of 06:50, 1 May 2017 (UTC)

Ryan Stephen Fraughan (born 11 February 1991) is an English professional footballer . He started his career in the Football League where he played for Tranmere Rovers.

== Career ==
Fraughan began his career with Tranmere Rovers, joining the side at the age of 14. On 31 December 2008, Fraughan signed his first professional contract, along with Ash Taylor, with Tranmere, making his professional debut for the club eight months later on 8 August 2009 in a Football League One clash with Yeovil Town at Huish Park, which ended in a 0–2 loss. In January 2010, Fraughan joined Welsh Premier League side Aberystwyth Town, managed by Tranmere youth coach Alan Morgan, on loan for the remainder of the 2009–10 season. He made his debut on 30 January 2010 in a 2–0 defeat to Port Talbot Town in the Welsh Cup, scoring his first goal in a 2–1 league win over Port Talbot Town 13 days later. At the end of the 2010–11 season he was not offered a new contract by Tranmere.

In July 2011 he joined Stockport County in the Conference National.

In January 2012 he joined The New Saints on loan where he appeared 10 times, scoring 3 goals. During his time with the club he picked up an award for Welsh Premier League player of the month for April. On 23 May Stockport reported that he was set to leave the club and join The New Saints, a move which was completed a few days later, with Fraughan signing a 1-year contract. He played for the club until August 2015 until he left the club by mutual consent after a spell on loan at Connah's Quay Nomads. He remained in the Welsh Premier, joining Airbus UK Broughton.

== Honours ==
- Welsh Premier League: Winners medal 2011/12 with The New Saints
- Welsh Premier League: Winners medal 2012/13 with The New Saints
- Welsh Premier League: Young Player of the Season 2012/13
- Welsh Premier League Team of the Year: 2012–13
- Welsh Cup Winners medal 2011/12 with The New Saints
