= Chris Blackburn =

English footballer (born 1982)

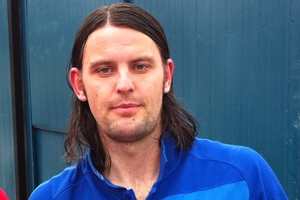
- Blackburn pictured in 2011

Personal information
- Full name: Christopher Raymond Blackburn
- Date of birth: 2 August 1982 (age 44)
- Place of birth: Chester, England
- Height: 6 ft 0 in (1.83 m)
- Position: Defender

Senior career*
| Years | Team | Apps | (Gls) |
| 1999–2003 | Chester City | 81 | (6) |
| 2003 | Nevada Wonders | 13 | (3) |
| 2003–2004 | Northwich Victoria | 28 | (0) |
| 2004–2007 | Morecambe | 122 | (4) |
| 2004 | → Nevada Wonders (loan) | 7 | (3) |
| 2007–2008 | Swindon Town | 7 | (0) |
| 2008 | → Weymouth (loan) | 13 | (2) |
| 2008–2010 | Aldershot Town | 78 | (0) |
| 2010–2011 | Wrexham | 43 | (1) |
| 2011–2012 | Stockport County | 15 | (0) |
| 2012–2013 | AFC Telford United | 22 | (1) |
| 2012 | → Chorley (loan) | 3 | (0) |
| Total | | 432 | (20) |

International career
| 2002–2006 | England C | 4 | (1) |
- * Club domestic league appearances and goals

Christopher Raymond Blackburn (born 2 August 1982) is an English footballer who plays as a defender.

== Career ==
=== Chester City ===
Blackburn started his career at hometown club Chester City as a youth product. He started as a midfielder and signed full pro forms at the Deva Stadium in 2000. He took over as goalkeeper in a 5–2 win over Dagenham & Redbridge in 2002 after Wayne Brown was sent off. He made 87 appearances for the Cheshire side between 1999 and 2003 before leaving in the summer of 2003 to play for the Nevada Wonders.

=== Nevada Wonders ===
In the summer of 2003, Blackburn signed for the Nevada Wonders where he played as a striker. The Nevada Wonders played in the fourth tier of the American soccer pyramid between May 2003 and August 2003. He then signed for Northwich Victoria at the beginning of the 2003–04 season, and made 28 appearances for them, before leaving for Morecambe in 2004.

=== Morecambe ===
In February 2004, he signed a short-term deal at Morecambe. Despite playing just five games towards the end of the 2003–04 season, Blackburn impressed sufficiently to be given a two-year contract.

That summer, he again played for the Wonders on loan, before an injury crisis at Christie Park saw him convert to a defender, where he regularly played at both centre half and right back. In these new positions, Blackburn formed a formidable partnership with Jim Bentley.

He was a member of the Morecambe side that lost to Hereford United in the 2006 Conference National Play-off semi-final. Chris made 126 appearances for the Lancashire side including playing 46 games in the 2006–07 season where Morecambe gained promotion to the Football League via the 2007 Conference play-off final. Blackburn played the whole of the play-off final match at the New Wembley in front of over 40,000 spectators against Exeter City as Morecambe won 2–1.

Despite being offered a new deal at Morecambe, Blackburn chose to move south and link up with Paul Sturrock at Swindon Town.

=== Swindon Town ===
The consistent performances for Morecambe attracted the attention of other league clubs and in July 2007, Blackburn joined Swindon Town. He scored twice for Swindon Town on his debut against Brentford in a Football League Trophy game.

In March 2008, he was loaned to Weymouth. His 13 games for the club ended with them avoiding relegation to the Conference South. He returned to Swindon and was subsequently released at the end of the season, despite having a year left on his contract.

=== Aldershot Town ===
A couple of weeks later, Blackburn signed a two-year contract with Conference National champions, Aldershot Town, who had just been promoted to League Two. He made his debut with Aldershot Town in their first League Two match at Accrington Stanley on the opening day of the 2008–09 season.

=== England National Game XI ===
He made his debut for the England National Game XI as a substitute against Italy in November 2002. He was also part of the England National Game XI squad that won the 2005–07 European Challenge Trophy. Blackburn scored in the 3–1 victory over Italy in February 2006.

=== Wrexham ===
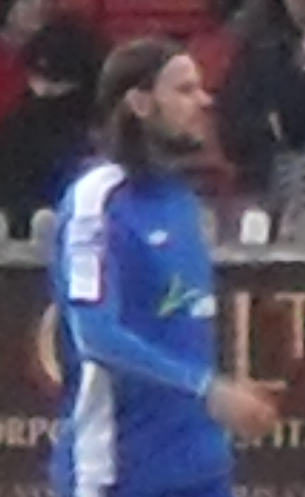
Blackburn with Wrexham.

Blackburn signed for Wrexham in June 2010 on a two-year contract after a good spell with Aldershot. He made his debut in August 2010 in an opening day victory over Cambridge United. He would start the season in a familiar central defence position, but in a new 4–3–3 system adopted by manager Dean Saunders, Blackburn was moved to a holding midfield role, where his game really improved. He quickly became a first team regular, and a fans favourite with the way he broke play and cleared up loose balls. He scored his first goal for the club against Cambridge United on 22 January 2011, heading home after the keeper had saved a shot, this goal put Wrexham 3–0 up after only twenty minutes away from home. He was a key player in Wrexham's play-off season, perhaps being the most consistent performer in the team, however the side lost 5–1 on aggregate in the end of season play-offs to eventual runners-up Luton Town.

Following a disagreement with manager Dean Saunders, Blackburn was transfer listed on 19 August 2011. Blackburn felt that his best position was central defence, while Saunders could not guarantee him a starting role in this position. Later on in the month his contract was terminated by mutual consent.

=== Stockport County ===
On 2 September he joined Stockport County making his debut the same day in a Conference National match against Luton Town.

=== AFC Telford United ===
He joined AFC Telford United on 4 January 2012. At the end of a small spell with the bucks he then agreed to sign a new one-year deal with the bucks. Following an injury from the first opening game of the season against Barrow he joined Chorley on a one-month loan to gain match fitness. On 11 January 2013 it was announced Blackburn had been released by the club.

== Honours ==
=== Club ===
- Football Conference: Play-off Winner 2007

== Personal life ==
He is the nephew of former Manchester City midfielder Alan Oakes and the cousin of ex-Wolves keeper Michael Oakes.
