= Joe Connor (footballer, born 1986) =

English footballer (born 1986)

Personal information
- Full name: Joseph Connor
- Date of birth: 1 February 1986 (age 40)
- Place of birth: Stockport, England
- Position: Midfielder

Youth career
- 2004–2007: Lee Flames

Senior career*
| Years | Team | Apps | (Gls) |
| 2005 | Fort Wayne Fever | 3 | (0) |
| 2008–2011 | Charlotte Eagles | 28 | (0) |
| 2011–2013 | Stockport County | 44 | (4) |
| 2013 | → Hereford United (loan) | 13 | (0) |
| 2013–2014 | Macclesfield Town | 35 | (0) |
| 2014–2015 | Southport | 37 | (4) |
| 2015 | Ashton United | | |
- * Club domestic league appearances and goals as of 20:16, 20 October 2014 (UTC)

Joseph Connor (born 1 February 1986) is an English footballer who plays as a midfielder.

== Career ==
=== College ===
Connor came from his native England to the United States in 2004, where he subsequently played four years of college soccer at Lee University. He was named to the All-Conference Southern Athletic Conference team as a junior in 2006.

=== Professional ===
Connor signed with Charlotte Eagles out of college in 2008, and made his professional debut on 8 August 2008, as a second-half substitute in a game against Cleveland City Stars.

In December 2011 he joined Stockport County on non-contract basis, a club both his father and grandfather had played for, he made his debut against Alfreton Town on 17 December 2011 and kept a clean sheet in a 0–0 draw.

Joe's first goal came in a 3–2 home win against Barrow on 1 January 2012. His second goal wasn't too long after in a 2–2 draw away at Braintree Town. The performances of Connor impressed manager Jim Gannon enough to offer Connor a contract until the end of the season. He was offered a further one-year contract by the club in May 2012.

Connor joined Football Conference side Macclesfield Town in June 2013, and within 10 games had established himself as a centre back in the first team.

In July 2015, Connor signed on to play for Ashton United of the Northern Premier League Premier Division.

== Personal life ==
His father Jim and grandfather Jack also played for Stockport County.

Sporting positions
| Preceded by Danny O'Donnell | Stockport County captain 2012–2013 | Succeeded by Kieran Charnock |
