= Andy Halls =

English footballer

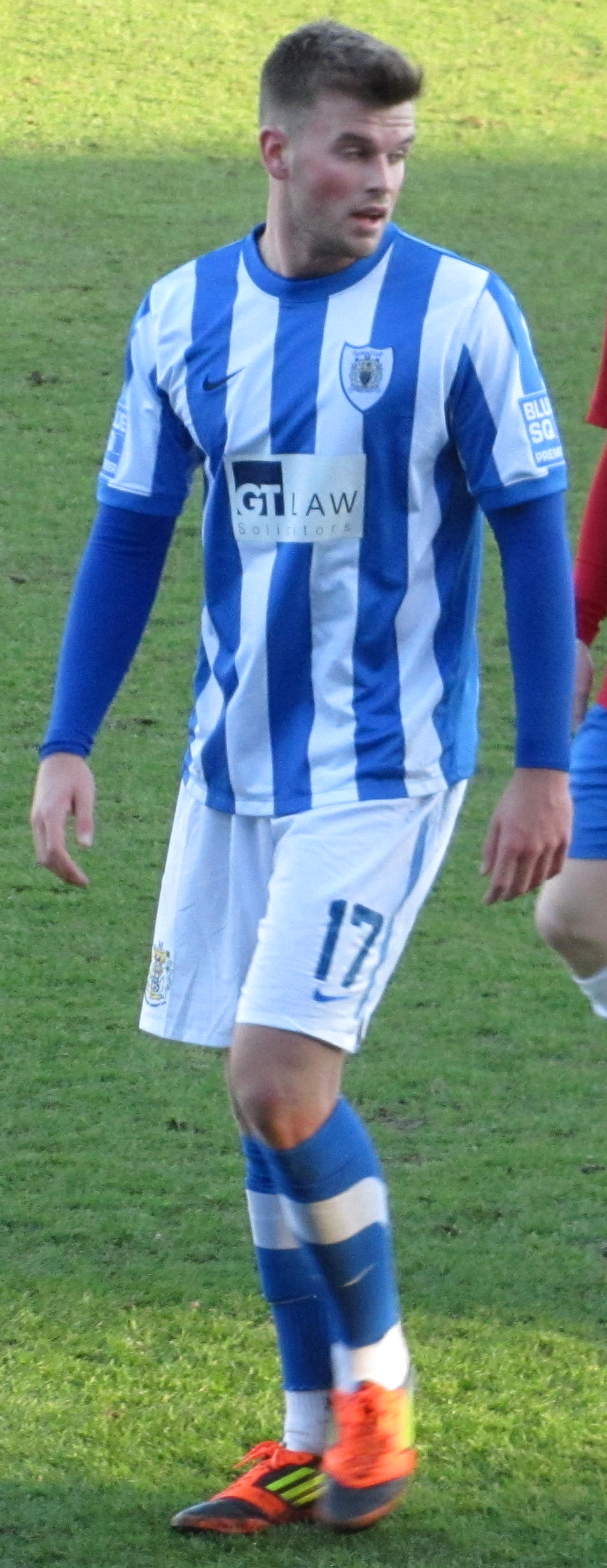
- Halls playing for Stockport County in 2012

Personal information
- Full name: Andrew Thomas Halls
- Date of birth: 20 April 1992 (age 34)
- Place of birth: Urmston, England
- Height: 1.83 m (6 ft 0 in)
- Position: Defender

Team information
- Current team: F.C. United of Manchester (on loan from Chorley)

Youth career
- –2009: Stockport County

Senior career*
Years	Team	Apps	(Gls)
2009–2013	Stockport County	98	(1)
2013–2017	Macclesfield Town	152	(1)
2017–2018	Chester	39	(0)
2018–2019	Guiseley	37	(2)
2019–2020	Curzon Ashton	30	(3)
2020–	Chorley	19	(1)
2021–	→ F.C. United of Manchester (loan)	8	(0)

International career
2014–2016	England C	4	(0)
- * Club domestic league appearances and goals as of 21:35, 15 February 2022 (UTC)

Andrew Thomas Halls (born 20 April 1992) is an English footballer who plays as a defender for Chorley.

== Club career ==
=== Stockport County ===
Born in Urmston, Greater Manchester, Halls made his first team debut for Stockport County on 11 April 2009 as part of a 1–0 defeat to Leeds United. In May 2011 he was offered a new one-year deal by the club which the club announced he had signed in July 2011.

He was offered a further deal by the club in May 2012. Halls scored his first professional goal in a 4–3 defeat against Southport on 1 December 2012.

=== Macclesfield Town ===
On 17 August 2013 Halls signed for Conference National side Macclesfield Town after being released by Stockport at the end of the previous season.

=== Later career ===
Following his departure from Macclesfield, Halls played joined Chester. He signed for Guiseley in July 2018 but left the club in May 2019. He subsequently signed for Curzon Ashton before joining Chorley. On 31 December 2021, he was sent out on a one-month, loan to Northern Premier League Premier Division side F.C. United of Manchester so that he could regain fitness after an injury lay-off.

== Career statistics ==
=== Club ===
As of 15 July 2017

Club	Season	League			FA Cup		League Cup		Other		Total	
Club	Season	Division	Apps	Goals	Apps	Goals	Apps	Goals	Apps	Goals	Apps	Goals
Stockport County	2008–09	League One	5	0	0	0	0	0	0	0	5	0
Stockport County	2009–10	League One	11	0	0	0	0	0	1 (Note: Appearance in the Football League Trophy)	0	12	0
Stockport County	2010–11	League Two	19	0	0	0	1	0	0	0	20	0
Stockport County	2011–12	Conference Premier	29	0	0	0	---		0	0	29	0
Stockport County	2012–13	Conference Premier	34	1	1	0	---		0	0	35	1
Stockport County	Stockport total		98	1	1	0	1	0	1	0	101	1
Macclesfield Town	2013–14	Conference Premier	37	0	4	0	---		0	0	41	0
Macclesfield Town	2014–15	Conference Premier	37	0	0	0	---		0	0	37	0
Macclesfield Town	2015–16	National League	41	0	1	0	---		0	0	42	0
Macclesfield Town	2016–17	National League	37	1	3	0	---		0	0	40	1
Macclesfield Town	Macclesfield total		152	1	8	0	---		0	0	160	2
Chester	2017–18	National League	0	0	0	0	---		0	0	0	0
Career total			250	2	9	0	1	0	1	0	261	2

== Honours ==
Macclesfield Town

- FA Trophy runner-up: 2016–17
