= 2007–08 Stockport County F.C. season =

Stockport County
2007–08 season
- Manager: Jim Gannon
- Stadium: Edgeley Park
- League Two: 4th
- Play-offs: Winners
- FA Cup: First round
- League Cup: Second round
- Football League Trophy: Area semi-finals
- Top goalscorer: Liam Dickinson (19)
Home colours	Away colours	Third colours

During the 2007–08 English football season, Stockport County F.C. competed in Football League Two.

== Season summary ==
Stockport County defeated Rochdale in the play-off final to gain promotion to League One.

== League table ==
Pos	Team	Pld	W	D	L	GF	GA	GD	Pts	Promotion or relegation
2	Peterborough United (P)	46	28	8	10	84	43	+41	92	Promotion to 2008–09 League One
3	Hereford United (P)	46	26	10	10	72	41	+31	88	Promotion to 2008–09 League One
4	Stockport County (O, P)	46	24	10	12	72	54	+18	82	Qualification for League Two playoffs
5	Rochdale	46	23	11	12	77	54	+23	80	Qualification for League Two playoffs
6	Darlington	46	22	12	12	67	40	+27	78	Qualification for League Two playoffs

Updated to match(es) played on 3 May 2008. Source: The Football League
Rules for classification: 1) points; 2) goal difference; 3) number of goals scored.
(O) Play-off winners; (P) Promoted

== First-team squad ==
Squad at end of season

Note: Flags indicate national team as defined under FIFA eligibility rules; some limited exceptions apply. Players may hold more than one non-FIFA nationality.

No.	Pos.	Nation	Player
1	GK	(England) ENG	Chris Adamson
2	DF	(England) ENG	Robert Clare
3	DF	(England) ENG	Michael Rose
4	MF	(England) ENG	Jason Taylor
5	DF	(Wales) WAL	Gareth Owen (Note: Owen was born in Cheadle, England, but also qualified to represent Wales internationally and has represented them at U-19 level.)
7	MF	(England) ENG	David Poole
8	MF	(Republic of Ireland) IRL	Gary Dicker
9	FW	(England) ENG	Amari Morgan-Smith
10	FW	(England) ENG	Matty McNeil
11	MF	(England) ENG	Adam Griffin
14	DF	(Republic of Ireland) IRL	Leon McSweeney
15	DF	(England) ENG	Michael Raynes
16	DF	(England) ENG	James Tunnicliffe
17	MF	(England) ENG	Anthony Pilkington (Note: Pilkington was born in Blackburn, England, but also qualified to represent the Republic of Ireland internationally through his paternal grandfather and would represent them at U-21 level before making his international debut for the Republic of Ireland in 2013.)
18	MF	(England) ENG	Greg Tansey
19	MF	(Republic of Ireland) IRL	Stephen Gleeson (on loan from Wolverhampton Wanderers)

No.	Pos.	Nation	Player
20	FW	(England) ENG	Liam Dickinson
21	MF	(England) ENG	Tommy Rowe
23	DF	(England) ENG	Jimmy McNulty
24	GK	(England) ENG	John Ruddy (on loan from Everton)
25	DF	(England) ENG	Gianluca Havern
26	GK	(Republic of Ireland) IRL	Conrad Logan (on loan from Leicester City)
27	FW	(England) ENG	Danny Ellis
28	MF	(England) ENG	Paul Turnbull
29	FW	(England) ENG	Chris Coward
30	MF	(England) ENG	Dominic Blizzard
31	FW	(England) ENG	Adam Proudlock
32	DF	(England) ENG	James Smith
33	FW	(England) ENG	Ryan Lowe (on loan from Crewe Alexandra)
34	MF	(England) ENG	James Vincent
40	GK	(England) ENG	Ben Imeson

=== Left club during season ===
Note: Flags indicate national team as defined under FIFA eligibility rules; some limited exceptions apply. Players may hold more than one non-FIFA nationality.

No.	Pos.	Nation	Player
6	DF	(Wales) WAL	Ashley Williams (Note: Williams was born in Wolverhampton, England, but also qualified to represent Wales internationally through his maternal grandfather and made his international debut for Wales in March 2008.) (on loan to Swansea City)
9	FW	(England) ENG	Anthony Elding (to Leeds United)
9	FW	(United States) USA	Johann Smith (on loan from Bolton Wanderers)
14	MF	(England) ENG	Keith Briggs (to Shrewsbury Town)
19	DF	(England) ENG	Paul Tierney (on loan from Blackpool)
22	GK	(England) ENG	Zak Jones (on loan from Blackburn Rovers)

No.	Pos.	Nation	Player
22	DF	(England) ENG	Shaleum Logan (on loan from Manchester City)
23	DF	(England) ENG	Michael Bowler (to Northwich Victoria)
24	MF	(England) ENG	Tony Dinning (to Chester City)
24	MF	(England) ENG	Les Thompson (on loan from Bolton Wanderers)
24	MF	(England) ENG	Adam Nowland (on loan from Preston North End)
