= 2008–09 Stockport County F.C. season =

Stockport County F.C.
2008–09 season
- Manager: Jim Gannon
- Football League One: 18th
- FA Cup: Second Round
- League Cup: First Round
- Football League Trophy: Second Round

This article documents the 2008–09 season of Cheshire football club Stockport County F.C.

== League table ==
Pos	Team	Pld	W	D	L	GF	GA	GD	Pts
16	Brighton & Hove Albion	46	13	13	20	55	70	−15	52
17	Yeovil Town	46	12	15	19	41	66	−25	51
18	Stockport County	46	16	12	18	59	57	+2	50 (Note: Stockport County deducted 10 points for entering administration.)
19	Hartlepool United	46	13	11	22	66	79	−13	50
20	Carlisle United	46	12	14	20	56	69	−13	50

Updated to match(es) played on 2 May 2009. Source: The Football League
Rules for classification: 1) points; 2) goal difference; 3) number of goals scored.

== Results ==
=== League One ===
9 August 2008 1	Huddersfield Town	1–1	Stockport County	Huddersfield
	Booth 30'		Rowe 45'	Stadium: Galpharm Stadium; Attendance: 15,578

16 August 2008 2	Stockport County	0–0	Leicester City	Stockport
				Stadium: Edgeley Park; Attendance: 7,151

23 August 2008 3	Hartlepool United	0–1	Stockport County	Hartlepool
			Rowe 90'	Stadium: Victoria Park; Attendance: 3,945

30 August 2008 4	Stockport County	0–3	Scunthorpe United	Stockport
			Hooper 30', 47'; McCann 58'	Stadium: Edgeley Park; Attendance: 6,348

13 September 2008 5	Leyton Orient	0–3	Stockport County	London
			Saah 13' (o.g.); McNulty 45'; Rowe 70'	Stadium: Matchroom Stadium; Attendance: 4,473

16 September 2008 6	Stockport County	1–1	Northampton Town	Stockport
	McSweeney 76'		Hawley 5'	Stadium: Edgeley Park; Attendance: 4,974

20 September 2008 7	Stockport County	1–1	Swindon Town	Stockport
	Gleeson 32'		Easton 49'	Stadium: Edgeley Park; Attendance: 5,536

27 September 2008 8	Cheltenham Town	2–2	Stockport County	Cheltenham
	Fleetwood 32'; Payne 66'		Thompson 55'; Raynes 90'	Stadium: Whaddon Road; Attendance: 3,796

3 October 2008 9	Stockport County	3–1	Oldham Athletic	Stockport
	Turnbull 47'; Thompson 68'; Michael Raynes 82'		Liddell 24'	Stadium: Edgeley Park; Attendance: 8,360

11 October 2008 10	Southend United	1–1	Stockport County	Southend
	Barnard 19'; Harding (red card) 68'		McSweeney 64'	Stadium: Roots Hall; Attendance: 7,125

18 October 2008 11	Stockport County	1–2	Colchester United	Stockport
	McNeil 42'		Perkins 20'; Platt 87'	Stadium: Edgeley Park; Attendance: 6,025

21 October 2008 12	Milton Keynes Dons	1–2	Stockport County	Milton Keynes
	Gerba 45'		Taylor 57'; Lewington 90' (o.g.)	Stadium: Stadium MK; Attendance: 6,931

25 October 2008 13	Hereford United	0–1	Stockport County	Hereford
			Rowe 90'	Stadium: Edgar Street; Attendance: 3,210

28 October 2008 14	Stockport County	0–0	Tranmere Rovers	Stockport
			Taylor (red card) 86'	Stadium: Edgeley Park; Attendance: 6,121

1 November 2008 15	Stockport County	3–0	Carlisle United	Stockport
	Baker 7', 70'; Gleeson 63'			Stadium: Edgeley Park; Attendance: 6,301

15 November 2008 16	Millwall	1–0	Stockport County	London
	Martin 76'			Stadium: The Den; Attendance: 9,030

22 November 2008 17	Crewe Alexandra	0–3	Stockport County	Crewe
			Davies 48'; Pilkington 66'; Thompson 90'	Stadium: Gresty Road; Attendance: 5,337

25 November 2008 18	Stockport County	2–0	Brighton & Hove Albion	Stockport
	Blizzard 33'; Davies 66' (pen.)			Stadium: Edgeley Park; Attendance: 5,201

6 December 2008 19	Stockport County	1–3	Peterborough United	Stockport
	Pilkington 52'		Raynes 22' (o.g.); Mackail-Smith 62'; Tunnicliffe 75' (o.g.)	Stadium: Edgeley Park; Attendance: 6,148

13 December 2008 20	Yeovil Town	2–4	Stockport County	Yeovil
	Smith 87'; Warne 43'		Mullins 24', 45'; Rowe 45'; Baker 89'	Stadium: Huish Park; Attendance: 3,687

20 December 2008 21	Stockport County	3–1	Bristol Rovers	Stockport
	Davies 27', 45', 90'		Disley 41'	Stadium: Edgeley Park; Attendance: 5,364

26 December 2008 22	Walsall	1–0	Stockport County	Walsall
	Weston 64'; Ricketts (red card) 67'			Stadium: Banks's Stadium; Attendance: 5,496

28 December 2008 23	Stockport County	1–3	Leeds United	Stockport
	Mullins 3'		Becchio 19'; Delph 73'; Christie 86'	Stadium: Edgeley Park; Attendance: 10,273

13 January 2009 24	Swindon Town	1–1	Stockport County	Swindon
	Smith 62'		Pilkington 73'	Stadium: County Ground; Attendance: 6,002

17 January 2009 25	Stockport County	3–1	Southend United	Stockport
	Pilkington 20', 38'; Rowe 84'		Clarke (red card) 43'; Revell 62'	Stadium: Edgeley Park; Attendance: 5,762

24 January 2009 26	Oldham Athletic	3–1	Stockport County	Oldham
	Whitaker 3'; Hughes 18'; Taylor 55'		Johnson 40'	Stadium: Boundary Park; Attendance: 7,605

27 January 2009 27	Tranmere Rovers	2–1	Stockport County	Birkenhead
	Edds 57'; Thomas-Moore 90' (pen.)		Johnson 90'	Stadium: Prenton Park; Attendance: 5,259

31 January 2009 28	Stockport County	4–1	Hereford United	Stockport
	Blizzard 1'; McNeil 33'; Mainwaring 52'; McSweeney 76'		Hewson 26'	Stadium: Edgeley Park; Attendance: 5,586

3 February 2009 29	Stockport County	0–1	Milton Keynes Dons	Stockport
			Wilbraham 36'	Stadium: Edgeley Park; Attendance: 4,891

14 February 2009 30	Stockport County	2–2	Millwall	Stockport
	McNeil 79'; Johnson 83'		McLeod 17', 53' (pen.); Martin (red card) 65'	Stadium: Edgeley Park; Attendance: 5,461

17 February 2009 31	Stockport County	1–0	Cheltenham Town	Stockport
	Johnson 31'			Stadium: Edgeley Park; Attendance: 5,041

21 February 2009 32	Carlisle United	1–2	Stockport County	Carlisle
	Neal 53'		Blizzard 6'; Rowe 70'	Stadium: Brunton Park; Attendance: 5,930

24 February 2009 33	Colchester United	1–0	Stockport County	Colchester
	Tierney 17'			Stadium: Weston Homes Community Stadium; Attendance: 3,179

28 February 2009 34	Stockport County	1–1	Huddersfield Town	Stockport
	Clarke 90' (o.g.)		Collins 16'	Stadium: Edgeley Park; Attendance: 7,739

3 March 2009 35	Leicester City	1–1	Stockport County	Leicester
	Gilbert 2'		O'Grady 5'	Stadium: Walkers Stadium; Attendance: 16,378

7 March 2009 36	Scunthorpe United	2–1	Stockport County	Scunthorpe
	Hurst 6'; Hooper 14'		Raynes 21'	Stadium: Glanford Park; Attendance: 4,890

10 March 2009 37	Stockport County	2–1	Hartlepool United	Stockport
	McSweeney 55'; Vincent 65'		Mackay 85'	Stadium: Edgeley Park; Attendance: 4,790

14 March 2009 38	Stockport County	0–1	Leyton Orient	Stockport
			Church 53'	Stadium: Edgeley Park; Attendance: 5,835

21 March 2009 39	Northampton Town	4–0	Stockport County	Northampton
	Akinfenwa 12'; Osman 45'; Guttridge 72'; Scott Vernon 79'			Stadium: Sixfields; Attendance: 4,814

28 March 2009 40	Bristol Rovers	2–0	Stockport County	Bristol
	Anthony 4'; Lambert 37' (pen.)			Stadium: Memorial Stadium; Attendance: 6,214

4 April 2009 41	Stockport County	0–0	Yeovil Town	Stockport
				Stadium: Edgeley Park; Attendance: 5,664

11 April 2009 42	Leeds United	1–0	Stockport County	Leeds
	Howson 9'			Stadium: Elland Road; Attendance: 24,967

13 April 2009 43	Stockport County	1–2	Walsall	Stockport
	Tansey 76'		Gerrard 11'; Logan 90' (o.g.)	Stadium: Edgeley Park; Attendance: 5,274

18 April 2009 44	Peterborough United	1–0	Stockport County	Peterborough
	Mackail-Smith 25'			Stadium: London Road; Attendance: 8,333

24 April 2009 45	Stockport County	4–3	Crewe Alexandra	Stockport
	Vincent 13'; O'Grady 49'; Johnson 65', 82'		Jones 24'; Lawrence 80'; McManus 90'	Stadium: Edgeley Park; Attendance: 7,134

2 May 2009 46	Brighton & Hove Albion	1–0	Stockport County	Brighton
	Forster 73'			Stadium: Withdean Stadium; Attendance: 8,618

=== FA Cup ===
8 November 2008 Round 1	Yeovil Town	1–1	Stockport County	Yeovil
	Skiverton 60'		Davies 44'; Gleeson (red card) 76'	Stadium: Huish Park; Attendance: 3,582

18 November 2008 Round 1 Replay	Stockport County	5–0	Yeovil Town	Stockport
	Dicker 6'; Rose 16'; McNeil 42'; Pilkington 48'; Vincent 90'			Stadium: Edgeley Park; Attendance: 3,260

29 November 2008 Round 2	Gillingham	0–0	Stockport County	Gillingham
				Stadium: Priestfield; Attendance: 4,419

9 December 2008 Round 2 Replay	Stockport County	1–2	Gillingham	Stockport
	Gleeson 17'		Barcham 25', 34'	Stadium: Edgeley Park; Attendance: 3,329

=== League Cup ===
12 August 2008 Round 1	Charlton Athletic	1–0	Stockport County	Leicester
	Howard 36'		McNeil (red card) 17'	Stadium: Walkers Stadium; Attendance: 7,386

=== Football League Trophy ===
2 September 2008 Round 1 Northern Section	Stockport County	1–0	Port Vale	Stockport
	McSweeney 4'			Stadium: Edgeley Park; Attendance: 2,290

29 November 2008 Round 2 Northern Section	Bury	1–0	Stockport County	Bury
	Bishop 77'			Stadium: Gigg Lane; Attendance: 2,384

== Players ==
=== First-team squad ===
Includes all players who were awarded squad numbers during the season.

Note: Flags indicate national team as defined under FIFA eligibility rules; some limited exceptions apply. Players may hold more than one non-FIFA nationality.

No.	Pos.	Nation	Player
1	GK	WAL	Owain Fôn Williams
2	DF	ENG	Johnny Mullins
3	DF	ENG	Michael Rose
4	MF	ENG	Dominic Blizzard
7	FW	ENG	Chris O'Grady (on loan from Oldham Athletic)
8	MF	IRL	Gary Dicker
9	FW	NIR	Peter Thompson
10	MF	ENG	Carl Baker
11	MF	ENG	Tommy Rowe
15	DF	ENG	Michael Raynes
16	DF	ENG	James Tunnicliffe
17	MF	ENG	Danny Rowe
18	MF	ENG	Paul Turnbull
19	FW	ENG	Matty McNeil
20	MF	IRL	Leon McSweeney

No.	Pos.	Nation	Player
21	GK	IRL	Conrad Logan (on loan from Leicester City)
23	GK	ENG	Lloyd Rigby
24	MF	ENG	Greg Tansey
25	DF	ENG	Josh Thompson
26	MF	ENG	Matty Mainwaring
27	FW	ENG	Danny Pilkington
28	MF	ENG	James Vincent
29	FW	ENG	Darren Green
31	MF	ENG	Paul Ennis
32	DF	ENG	Andy Halls
34	FW	ENG	Oli Johnson
35	FW	ENG	Tom Fisher
42	MF	WAL	Craig Roberts

=== Left club during season ===
Note: Flags indicate national team as defined under FIFA eligibility rules; some limited exceptions apply. Players may hold more than one non-FIFA nationality.

No.	Pos.	Nation	Player
21	GK	ENG	Fraser Forster (on loan from Newcastle United)
22	DF	POL	Jarosław Fojut (on loan from Bolton Wanderers)
33	DF	NIR	Tony Kane (on loan from Blackburn Rovers)
35	FW	WAL	Craig Davies (on loan from Oldham Athletic)
17	MF	IRL	Stephen Gleeson (on loan from Wolverhampton Wanderers)
14	MF	ENG	Jason Taylor
25	DF	ENG	Gianluca Havern

No.	Pos.	Nation	Player
5	DF	WAL	Gareth Owen
7	FW	IRL	Anthony Pilkington
22	DF	ENG	Jimmy McNulty
22	DF	ENG	Robbie Threlfall (on loan from Liverpool)
39	FW	IRL	Dave Mooney (on loan from Reading)
30	FW	IRL	Declan Edwards (on loan to Galway United)
