= 2009–10 Stockport County F.C. season =

Stockport County
2009–10 season
- Chairman: Administrators
- Manager: Gary Ablett
- Stadium: Edgeley Park
- League One: 24th
- FA Cup: Second Round
- League Cup: First Round
- Football League Trophy: Second Round
- Top goalscorer: League: Carl Baker (9); All: Carl Baker (13)
- Highest home attendance: 7,768 vs Leeds United, League One, 28 December 2009
- Lowest home attendance: 3,281 vs Swindon Town, League One, 19 January 2010
- Average home league attendance: 4,420
| Home colours | Away colours |

The 2009–10 season is Stockport County's 128th season in football, and their second in League One since gaining promotion via the League Two play-offs in 2008. Stockport completed the whole season in administration. This season ran from 1 July 2009 to 30 June 2010.

Gary Ablett was named manager for the whole season after his predecessor Jim Gannon was made redundant in May 2009.

== Background ==
This is a list of the significant events to occur at the club during the 2009–10 season, presented in chronological order. This list does not include transfers, which are listed in the transfers section below, or match results, which are in the results section.

After ending the 2008–09 season in 18th position with 50 points (60 points without the ten-point deduction), Stockport County were placed into administration following a battle to repay creditors. A creditor of the club wrote a petition to repay a loan of around £300,000 to him. The club has also struggled to repay a tax debt of £250,000 to HM Revenue and Customs.

On 17 June the Administrators agreed terms with the Melrose Consortium for the sale of Stockport County. The club also announced that they will play Huddersfield Town away in the League Cup First Round., As well as announcing the fixtures for the season

On 3 July Administrators agree Company Voluntary Arrangement (CVA) with previous shareholders and creditors.

On 8 July Stockport County appointment Gary Ablett as new manager.

On 22 July Stockport Announced their new kit for the season which was manufactured my Macron. The home kit was a traditional blue and white, while there was a new away kit which consisted of orange and black.

On 27 July Gary Ablett appointed Paul Gerrard as the club's goalkeeping coach, Gerrard also carried on his playing career for the club as he registered as cover for first choice goalkeeper Owain Fôn Williams .

On 3 September Carl Baker became the first Stockport County player to score consecutive away hat-tricks, after he scored Three in a 4–2 win over Brighton in the League and also three in a 4–1 win over Crewe in the Football League Trophy Due to Carl'shat -trick against Crewe, Stockport advanced to the second round where they faced Port Vale However a day later Assistant Manager John Ward left the club to take up same position at Colchester United.

On 18 September Gary Ablett was handed a one match touchline ban after he was dismissed to the stands against Leeds United away from home.

On 16 December 2009 the team's training ground was put up for sale.

== Summary ==
=== Results summary ===
| Overall | | | | | | | | Home | | | | | | Away | | | | | |
| Pld | W | D | L | GF | GA | GD | Pts | W | D | L | GF | GA | GD | W | D | L | GF | GA | GD |
|---|---|---|---|---|---|---|---|---|---|---|---|---|---|---|---|---|---|---|---|
| 46 | 5 | 10 | 31 | 35 | 95 | −60 | 25 | 2 | 6 | 15 | 21 | 51 | −30 | 3 | 4 | 16 | 14 | 44 | −30 |

Last updated: 5 June 2010.
Source: SCFC League One Results

=== Round by round ===
| Round | 1 | 2 | 3 | 4 | 5 | 6 | 7 | 8 | 9 | 10 | 11 | 12 | 13 | 14 | 15 | 16 | 17 | 18 | 19 | 20 | 21 | 22 | 23 | 24 | 25 | 26 | 27 | 28 | 29 | 30 | 31 | 32 | 33 | 34 | 35 | 36 | 37 | 38 | 39 | 40 | 41 | 42 | 43 | 44 | 45 | 46 |
|---|---|---|---|---|---|---|---|---|---|---|---|---|---|---|---|---|---|---|---|---|---|---|---|---|---|---|---|---|---|---|---|---|---|---|---|---|---|---|---|---|---|---|---|---|---|---|
| Ground | A | H | H | A | H | A | A | H | A | H | H | A | H | A | H | A | H | A | A | H | A | A | H | H | A | H | A | H | H | A | A | H | A | A | H | H | H | A | H | A | H | A | A | H | A | H |
| Result | D | L | L | W | D | L | D | W | D | D | L | W | L | L | L | L | L | L | L | L | L | L | L | L | D | D | L | L | D | W | L | W | L | L | D | L | L | L | D | L | L | L | L | L | L | L |
| Position | 15 | 20 | 21 | 15 | 14 | 18 | 18 | 13 | 13 | 16 | 20 | 13 | 18 | 20 | 21 | 21 | 21 | 23 | 24 | 24 | 24 | 24 | 24 | 24 | 24 | 24 | 24 | 24 | 24 | 24 | 24 | 24 | 24 | 24 | 24 | 24 | 24 | 24 | 24 | 24 | 24 | 24 | 24 | 24 | 24 | 24 |

Updated to match(es) played on 5 June 2010. Source: League One Results
A = Away; H = Home; W = Win; D = Draw; L = Loss

=== League One table ===
| Pos | Team | Pld | W | D | L | GF | GA | GD | Pts | Promotion, qualification or relegation |
|---|---|---|---|---|---|---|---|---|---|---|
| 20 | Hartlepool United | 46 | 14 | 11 | 21 | 59 | 67 | −8 | 50 (Note: Hartlepool were deducted 3 points for fielding an ineligible player.) | |
| 21 | Gillingham (R) | 46 | 12 | 14 | 20 | 48 | 64 | −16 | 50 | Relegation to Football League Two |
| 22 | Wycombe Wanderers (R) | 46 | 10 | 15 | 21 | 56 | 76 | −20 | 45 | Relegation to Football League Two |
| 23 | Southend United (R) | 46 | 10 | 13 | 23 | 51 | 72 | −21 | 43 | Relegation to Football League Two |
| 24 | Stockport County (R) | 46 | 5 | 10 | 31 | 35 | 95 | −60 | 25 | Relegation to Football League Two |

Source: The Football League
Rules for classification: 1) points; 2) goal difference; 3) number of goals scored.
(R) Relegated

== Statistics ==
=== Goalscorers ===
| No. | Flag | Pos | Name | League One | FA Cup | League Cup | League Trophy | Total |
|---|---|---|---|---|---|---|---|---|
| 10 | (England) | MF | Carl Baker | 9 | 1 | 0 | 3 | 13 |
| 10 | (England) | FW | Jabo Ibehre | 5 | 0 | 0 | 0 | 5 |
| 36 | (England) | FW | George Donnelly | 4 | 0 | 0 | 0 | 4 |
| 9 | (Northern Ireland) | FW | Peter Thompson | 2 | 1 | 0 | 0 | 3 |
| 24 | (England) | FW | Nicholas Bignall | 2 | 0 | 0 | 1 | 3 |
| 15 | (England) | MF | David Poole | 0 | 1 | 1 | 0 | 2 |
| 11 | (England) | DF | Michael Rose | 2 | 0 | 0 | 0 | 2 |
| 11 | (England) | FW | Jemal Johnson | 2 | 0 | 0 | 0 | 2 |
| 11 | (England) | MF | Greg Tansey | 2 | 0 | 0 | 0 | 2 |
| 11 | (England) | MF | Paul Turnbull | 0 | 2 | 0 | 0 | 2 |
| 11 | (England) | FW | Michael Raynes | 1 | 0 | 0 | 0 | 1 |
| 11 | (England) | FW | Danny Pilkington | 1 | 0 | 0 | 0 | 1 |
| 11 | (England) | MF | Richie Partridge | 1 | 0 | 0 | 0 | 1 |
| 11 | (England) | DF | Johnny Mullins | 1 | 0 | 0 | 0 | 1 |
| 11 | (England) | FW | Oli Johnson | 1 | 0 | 0 | 0 | 1 |
| 11 | (England) | MF | Liam Bridcutt | 0 | 0 | 0 | 1 | 1 |
| | | | Own Goals | 2 | 0 | 0 | 0 | 2 |

==== Penalties Awarded ====
| Date | Success? | Penalty Taker | Opponent | Competition | Notes |
|---|---|---|---|---|---|
| 22 August 2009 | ✓ | (England) Carl Baker | Brighton & Hove Albion | League One | |
| 29 August 2009 | ✓ | (England) Carl Baker | Southampton | League One | |
| 12 September 2009 | ✓ | (England) Carl Baker | Yeovil Town | League One | |
| 12 October 2009 | ✓ | (England) Carl Baker | Tranmere Rovers | League One | |
| 7 November 2009 | ✓ | (England) Carl Baker | Tooting & Mitcham United | FA Cup | |
| 6 February 2010 | ✗ | (England) George Donnelly | Milton Keynes Dons | League One | |
| 3 April 2010 | ✓ | (England) Jabo Ibehre | Walsall | League One | |

=== Assists ===
| No. | Flag | Pos | Name | League One | FA Cup | League Cup | League Trophy | Total |
|---|---|---|---|---|---|---|---|---|
| 10 | (England) | MF | Danny Pilkington | 1 | 1 | 0 | 1 | 3 |
| 10 | (England) | MF | Liam Bridcutt | 3 | 0 | 0 | 0 | 3 |
| 36 | (England) | MF | David Poole | 2 | 1 | 0 | 0 | 3 |
| 9 | (Northern Ireland) | FW | Jabo Ibehre | 2 | 0 | 0 | 0 | 2 |
| 24 | (England) | MF | Carl Baker | 1 | 0 | 0 | 1 | 2 |
| 15 | (England) | MF | Richie Partridge | 2 | 0 | 0 | 0 | 2 |
| 11 | (England) | MF | James Vincent | 1 | 0 | 0 | 0 | 1 |
| 11 | (England) | DF | Michael Rose | 0 | 0 | 1 | 0 | 1 |
| 11 | (England) | MF | Paul Turnbull | 1 | 0 | 0 | 0 | 1 |
| 11 | (England) | DF | Johnny Mullins | 0 | 1 | 0 | 0 | 1 |
| 11 | (England) | DF | Paul Huntington | 1 | 0 | 0 | 0 | 1 |
| 11 | (England) | DF | Mat Sadler | 1 | 0 | 0 | 0 | 1 |

=== Disciplinary record ===
Note: Cards from all competitions are included.

| Number | Nation | Position | Name | Total | |
| Number | Nation | Position | Name | Yellow card | Red card |
| 20 | (England) | DF | Johnny Mullins | 8 | 0 |
| 20 | (England) | MF | Paul Turnbull | 6 | 0 |
| 20 | (England) | MF | Greg Tansey | 5 | 0 |
| 20 | (England) | DF | Michael Raynes | 5 | 0 |
| 20 | (England) | DF | Michael Rose | 5 | 0 |
| 20 | (England) | MF | David Poole | 4 | 2 |
| 20 | (England) | FW | Jabo Ibehre | 4 | 1 |
| 20 | (England) | MF | Liam Bridcutt | 4 | 1 |
| 20 | (England) | MF | David Perkins | 4 | 0 |
| 20 | (England) | DF | Danny Swailes | 3 | 1 |
| 20 | (England) | DF | Paul Huntington | 3 | 1 |
| 20 | (England) | DF | Mat Sadler | 2 | 0 |
| 20 | (United States) | FW | Jemal Johnson | 2 | 0 |
| 20 | (England) | MF | Danny Pilkington | 2 | 0 |
| 20 | (England) | DF | George Donnelly | 2 | 0 |
| 20 | (England) | DF | Carl Baker | 1 | 1 |
| 20 | (Northern Ireland) | DF | Peter Thompson | 1 | 0 |
| 20 | (England) | DF | James Vincent | 1 | 0 |
| 20 | (Republic of Ireland) | DF | Richie Partridge | 1 | 0 |
| | | | Totals | 63 | 7 |

=== Player Awards ===
| Date | Player | Award | Notes |
|---|---|---|---|
| 24 August 2009 | Carl Baker | League One Team of the Week | |
| 14 September 2009 | Carl Baker | League One Team of the Week | |
| 8 May 2010 | Johnny Mullins | Player of The Season Award | |
| 8 May 2010 | Danny Pilkington | Young Player of The Season Award | |
| 8 May 2010 | Danny Pilkington | Goal of The Season Award | Goal Scored vs Brighton & Hove Albion (Home) |
| 8 May 2010 | Johnny Mullins | Community Player of The Season Award | |

=== Overall statistics ===
| Statistic | Total | League | FA Cup | League Cup | Football League Trophy |
| Games played | 51 | 46 | 2 | 1 | 2 |
| Games won | 7 | 5 | 1 | 0 | 1 |
| Games drawn | 10 | 10 | 0 | 0 | 0 |
| Games lost | 34 | 31 | 1 | 1 | 1 |
| Goals scored | 46 | 35 | 5 | 1 | 5 |
| Goals conceded | 106 | 95 | 4 | 3 | 4 |
| Goal difference | −60 | −60 | 1 | −2 | 1 |
| Clean sheets | 7 | 6 | 1 | 0 | 0 |
| Yellow cards | 63 | 59 | 1 | 2 | 1 |
| Red cards | 7 | 7 | 0 | 0 | 0 |
| Biggest win | 4–1 vs Crewe Alexandra, Football League Trophy, 1 September 2009. | | | | |
| Biggest defeat | 0–6 vs Huddersfield Town, League One, 24 April 2010. | | | | |
| Most appearances | (England) Owain Fôn Williams — 46 (46 starts, 0 substitute) | | | | |
| Top scorer | (England) Carl Baker — 13 | | | | |
| Top assists | (England) Danny Pilkington — 3 (England) Liam Bridcutt — 3 (England) David Poole — 3 | | | | |
| Worst discipline | (England) Johnny Mullins — 8 (yellow card) 0 (red card) (England) David Poole — 4 (yellow card) 2 (red card) | | | | |

Last updated: 10 May 2010.
Source: Competitions' Wikipedia articles.

== Review ==
=== Pre-season ===
Stockport County wore a pink and black kit to raise money for leukaemia research

During Stockport's Pre-Season campaign they wore a limited edition kit containing the colours of pink and black which was manufactured by Prostar. This was worn until the official kits were announced. The pink and black kits were used to raise money for leukaemia research. These kits were then auctioned off after pre-season.

Stockport began pre-season with a 0 – 0 away draw against Barrow in Gary Ablett's first match in charge. Stockport's next Pre-Season match was away to Nostell Miners Welfare in which Stockport won 5 – 0. With Goals coming from Oli Johnson, Peter Thompson (Northern Ireland footballer) (Who scored two) and Tom Fisher (footballer) (Who also scored two). Four Days later Stockport won their third consecutive Pre-Season match when they won 1 – 0 away to Vauxhall Motors. Craig Roberts scored the only goal of the game for Stockport from 30 yards. On 25 July Stockport won their first Pre-Season home game when they beat Grimsby Town 1 – 0. David Poole scored the only goal for Stockport. Matty Mainwaring would suffer a serious leg injury in this match ruling him out for the season. Stockport would then travel to Belfast to play against striker Peter Thompson's former club Linfield in Glenn Ferguson's testimonial match. Stockport ran away with a 3 – 1 win with, Greg Tansey, Danny Pilkington and Adam Griffin scoring for Stockport. Glenn Ferguson scored the home sides consolation. Stockport's final Pre-Season match was against La Liga outfit Real Valladolid in a match they lost 3 – 1. Gianluca Havern scored Stockport's only goal after 20 minutes.

=== August ===
Stockport earned a point in their first League match of the season with a 0 – 0 draw against Oldham Athletic. Stockport exited this season's Carling Cup in the first round when the lost 3 – 1 away to Huddersfield Town. Jordan Rhodes scored 2 for the home side and Theo Robinson extended the lead to 3. David Poole scored a consolation for Stockport in the 88th minute. Stockport then lost 2 – 0 at home to Bristol Rovers. Danny Coles and Jo Kuffour scored the Rovers goals. Three days later, Stockport then lost for the second time in succession in the league when they lost 2 – 1 at home to Carlisle United. Kevan Hurst opened the scoring but one minute later Stockport were lever via a Richard Keogh own goal.Joe Anyinsah rounded off the scoring to give Carlisle the points. Stockport won their first match of the season when they beat Brighton & Hove Albion 4 – 2, in a match that was full of instances. Three of Stockport's four goals were scored by Carl Baker (One of which was a penalty) the other was scored by Oli Johnson. Liam Bridcutt was sent off on his Stockport début. Nicky Forster and Former Stockport star Liam Dickinson scored while Tommy Elphick and Colin Hawkins were sent off for the home side. Stockport finished the month with a 1 – 1 draw at home to Southampton. Carl Baker scored his second penalty in a week to salvage a point in second half stoppage time. Former Stockport midfielder Rickie Lambert scored a penalty for Southampton in first half stoppage time.

== Results ==
=== Legend ===
| Win | Draw | Loss |

=== Pre-season friendlies ===
| 15 July 2009 Friendly | Barrow | 0–0 | Stockport County | Barrow-in-Furness |
| 19:45 | | Report | | Stadium: Holker Street; Attendance: 427 |

| 18 July 2009 Friendly | Nostell Miners Welfare | 0–5 | Stockport County | Crofton |
| 14:30 | | Report | Thompson 46', 72'; Johnson 55'; Fisher 61', 75' | Stadium: Cougar Park; Attendance: 300 |

| 22 July 2009 Friendly | Vauxhall Motors | 0–1 | Stockport County | Ellesmere Port |
| 19:15 | | Report | Roberts 80' | Stadium: Rivacre Park |

| 25 July 2009 Friendly | Stockport County | 1–0 | Grimsby Town | Stockport |
| 15:00 | Poole 53' | Report | | Stadium: Edgeley Park; Attendance: 1,144 |

| 1 August 2009 Friendly | Linfield (Northern Ireland) | 1–3 | (England) Stockport County | Belfast, Northern Ireland |
| 15:00 | Ferguson 14' | Report | Tansey 58'; Pilkington 75'; Griffin 77' | Stadium: Windsor Park |

| 4 August 2009 Friendly | Stockport County (England) | 1–3 | (Spain) Real Valladolid | Stockport, England |
| 19:30 | Havern 20' | Report | Nivaldo 37'; Font 75'; Manucho 88' | Stadium: Edgeley Park; Attendance: 1,993 |

=== League One ===
| 8 August 2009 1 | Oldham Athletic | 0–0 | Stockport County | Oldham |
| 15:00 | Whitaker (yellow card) 78' | Report | Havern (yellow card) 66'; Williams (yellow card) 90' | Stadium: Boundary Park; Attendance: 6,918 |

| 15 August 2009 2 | Stockport County | 0–2 | Bristol Rovers | Stockport |
| 15:00 | | Report | Kuffour 3'; Coles 8' | Stadium: Edgeley Park; Attendance: 4,084 |

| 18 August 2009 3 | Stockport County | 1–2 | Carlisle United | Stockport |
| 19:45 | Keogh og 14' | Report | Hurst 13'; Anyinsah 65' | Stadium: Edgeley Park; Attendance: 4,009 |

| 22 August 2009 4 | Brighton & Hove Albion | 2–4 | Stockport County | Brighton |
| 15:00 | Forster 28'; Dickinson 59'; Elphick (red card) 62'; Hawkins (red card) 65' | Report | Baker 30', 54', 66' (pen.); Johnson 89'; Bridcutt (red card) 84' | Stadium: Withdean Stadium; Attendance: 5,270 |

| 29 August 2009 5 | Stockport County | 1–1 | Southampton | Stockport |
| 15:00 | Baker 90' | Report | Lambert 45' | Stadium: Edgeley Park; Attendance: 4,680 |

| 5 September 2009 6 | Leeds United | 2–0 | Stockport County | Leeds |
| 15:00 | Grella 9'; Michalík 37' | Report | | Stadium: Elland Road; Attendance: 22,870 |

| 12 September 2009 7 | Yeovil Town | 2–2 | Stockport County | Yeovil |
| 15:00 | Tomlin 33'; Williams 68'; McCarthy (red card) 20' | Report | Baker 22', 45' | Stadium: Huish Park; Attendance: 3,519 |

| 19 September 2009 8 | Stockport County | 2–1 | Leyton Orient | Stockport |
| 15:00 | Bignall 49'; Tansey 77' | Report | Mkandawire 88' | Stadium: Edgeley Park; Attendance: 4,091 |

| 26 September 2009 9 | Huddersfield Town | 0–0 | Stockport County | Huddersfield |
| 15:00 | | Report | | Stadium: Kirklees Stadium; Attendance: 14,921 |

| 29 September 2009 10 | Stockport County | 2–2 | Hartlepool United | Stockport |
| 19:45 | Bignall 16'; Raynes 17' | Report | Boyd 51'; Denis Behan 75' | Stadium: Edgeley Park; Attendance: 3,780 |

| 3 October 2009 11 | Stockport County | 0–2 | Southend United | Stockport |
| 15:00 | | Report | Barnard (pen 57), 90+5' | Stadium: Edgeley Park; Attendance: 4,102 |

| 12 October 2009 12 | Tranmere Rovers | 0–1 | Stockport County | Birkenhead |
| 19:45 | | Report | Baker (pen 67) | Stadium: Prenton Park; Attendance: 5,645 |

| 17 October 2009 13 | Stockport County | 0–4 | Millwall | Stockport |
| 15:00 | | Report | Robinson 18'; Harris 23', 37', 68' | Stadium: Edgeley Park; Attendance: 4,394 |

| 24 October 2009 14 | Brentford | 2–0 | Stockport County | London |
| 15:00 | MacDonald 45+1'; Weston 70' | Report | | Stadium: Griffin Park; Attendance: 5,045 |

| 31 October 2009 15 | Stockport County | 1–3 | Norwich City | Stockport |
| 15:00 | Thompson 82' | Report | Holt 16', 90'; Hoolahan (pen 69) | Stadium: Edgeley Park; Attendance: 5,218 |

| 14 November 2009 16 | Walsall | 2–0 | Stockport County | Walsall |
| 15:00 | Richards 37'; Byfield 56' | Report | | Stadium: Bescot Stadium; Attendance: 4,143 |

| 21 November 2009 17 | Stockport County | 1–3 | Exeter City | Stockport |
| 15:00 | Rose 81' | Report | Harley 39'; Stansfield 90+1'; Logan 90+4' | Stadium: Edgeley Park; Attendance: 4,101 |

| 24 November 2009 18 | Colchester United | 2–0 | Stockport County | Colchester |
| 19:45 | Lisbie 10'; Platt 15' | Report | | Stadium: Colchester Community Stadium; Referee: Phil Gibbs |

| 5 December 2009 20 | Wycombe Wanderers | 2–1 | Stockport County | High Wycombe |
| 15:00 | Westwood 74'; Davies 83' | Report | Baker 64' | Stadium: Adams Park; Referee: Darren Sheldrake |

| 12 December 2009 21 | Stockport County | 1–2 | Charlton Athletic | Stockport |
| 15:00 | Elliot 90' (o.g.) | Report | Sodje 13'; Wagstaff 74' | Stadium: Edgeley Park; Referee: Eddie Ilderton |

| 19 December 2009 22 | Gillingham | 3–1 | Stockport County | Gillingham |
| 15:00 | Oli 9'; Brandy 27'; Nutter 34' | Report | Rose 65' | Stadium: Priestfield Stadium; Referee: David Phillips |

| 26 December 2009 23 | Milton Keynes Dons | 4–1 | Stockport County | Milton Keynes |
| 15:00 | Puncheon 25', 82'; Easter 28'; Quashie 49' | Report | Thompson 76' | Stadium: Stadium MK; Referee: Trevor Kettle |

| 28 December 2009 24 | Stockport County | 2–4 | Leeds United | Stockport |
| 12:00 | Baker 12'; Mullins 61' | Report | Snodgrass 2'; Beckford 67', 90'; Bromby 87' | Stadium: Edgeley Park; Referee: Kevin Friend |

| 19 January 2010 19 | Stockport County | 0–1 | Swindon Town | Stockport |
| 19:45 | | Report | Paynter 73' (pen.) | Stadium: Edgeley Park; Referee: Graham Salisbury |

| 23 January 2010 28 | Carlisle United | 0–0 | Stockport County | Carlisle |
| 15:00 | | Report | | Stadium: Brunton Park; Referee: Chris Sarginson |

| 26 January 2010 25 | Stockport County | 1–1 | Brighton & Hove Albion | Stockport |
| 19:45 | Pilkington 58' | Report | Crofts 90' | Stadium: Edgeley Park; Referee: Peter Quinn |

| 30 January 2010 29 | Southampton | 2–0 | Stockport County | Southampton |
| 15:00 | Lambert 63'; Waigo 69' | Report | | Stadium: St Mary's Stadium; Referee: Fred Graham |

| 6 February 2010 30 | Stockport County | 1–3 | Milton Keynes Dons | Stockport |
| 15:00 | Donnelly 11' | Report | Easter 24'; Wilbraham 56'; Townsend 74' | Stadium: Edgeley Park; Referee: Jock Waugh |

| 13 February 2010 31 | Stockport County | 2–2 | Colchester United | Stockport |
| 15:00 | Ibehre 22', 77' | Report | Prutton 10'; Wordsworth 18' | Stadium: Edgeley Park; Referee: Andy Haines |

| 20 February 2010 32 | Exeter City | 0–1 | Stockport County | Exeter |
| 15:00 | | Report | J. Johnson 77' | Stadium: St James Park; Referee: Gavin Ward |

| 23 February 2010 33 | Swindon Town | 4–1 | Stockport County | Swindon |
| 19:45 | Ward 4'; Paynter 45', 80'; Ferry 74' | Report | Tansey 45' | Stadium: County Ground; Referee: Roger East |

| 27 February 2010 34 | Stockport County | 4–3 | Wycombe Wanderers | Stockport |
| 15:00 | Partridge 22'; Donnelly 23', 53'; J. Johnson 53' | Report | Phillips 67', 70'; Williams 85' (o.g.) | Stadium: Edgeley Park; Referee: Colin Webster |

| 2 March 2010 26 | Bristol Rovers | 1–0 | Stockport County | Bristol |
| 19:45 | Hughes 30' | Report | | Stadium: Memorial Stadium; Referee: Dean Whitestone |

| 6 March 2010 35 | Charlton Athletic | 2–0 | Stockport County | Charlton |
| 15:00 | Huntington 7' (o.g.); Sodje 10' | Report | | Stadium: The Valley; Referee: Keith Stroud |

| 13 March 2010 36 | Stockport County | 0–0 | Gillingham | Stockport |
| 15:00 | | Report | | Stadium: Edgeley Park; Referee: David Foster |

| 16 March 2010 27 | Stockport County | 0–1 | Oldham Athletic | Stockport |
| 19:45 | Swailes (red card) 24'; Turnbull (yellow card) 55'; Mullins (yellow card) 90' | Report | Abbott 25'; Eaves (yellow card) 90' | Stadium: Edgeley Park; Referee: Jon Moss |

| 20 March 2010 37 | Stockport County | 0–1 | Brentford | Stockport |
| 15:00 | | Report | MacDonald 46' | Stadium: Edgeley Park; Referee: Nigel Miller |

| 27 March 2010 38 | Millwall | 5–0 | Stockport County | Bermondsey |
| 15:00 | Swailes 27' (o.g.); Morison 42'; Schofield 45'; Huntington 58' (o.g.); Obika 69' | Report | | Stadium: The Den; Referee: Pat Miller |

| 3 April 2010 39 | Stockport County | 1–1 | Walsall | Stockport |
| 15:00 | Ibehre 19' (pen.) | Report | Gray 47' | Stadium: Edgeley Park; Referee: Michael Oliver |

| 5 April 2010 40 | Norwich City | 2–1 | Stockport County | Norwich |
| 15:00 | McNamee 3'; Holt 25' | Report | Ibehre 12' | Stadium: Carrow Road; Referee: Fred Graham |

| 10 April 2010 41 | Stockport County | 1–3 | Yeovil Town | Stockport |
| 15:00 | Donnelly 82' | Report | Bowditch 21'; Williams 32', 74' | Stadium: Edgeley Park; Referee: Geoff Eltringham |

| 13 April 2010 42 | Hartlepool United | 3–0 | Stockport County | Hartlepool |
| 19:45 | Gamble 14'; Monkhouse 56'; O'Donovan 90' | Report | | Stadium: Victoria Park; Referee: Andy Hall |

| 17 April 2010 43 | Leyton Orient | 2–0 | Stockport County | Leyton |
| 15:00 | Jarvis 53'; Lichaj 80' | Report | | Stadium: Brisbane Road; Referee: Steve Rushton |

| 24 April 2010 44 | Stockport County | 0–6 | Huddersfield Town | Stockport |
| 15:00 | | Report | Pilkington 2'; Robinson 37'; Rhodes 68'; Drinkwater 85'; Roberts 90'; Novak 90' (pen.) | Stadium: Edgeley Park; Referee: Andy Woolmer |

| 1 May 2010 45 | Southend United | 2–1 | Stockport County | Southend-on-Sea |
| 15:00 | Crawford 75'; McCormack 89' | Report | Ibehre 71' | Stadium: Roots Hall; Referee: Craig Sarginson |

| 8 May 2010 46 | Stockport County | 0–3 | Tranmere Rovers | Stockport |
| 15:00 | | Report | Goodison 38'; Thomas-Moore 53'; Labadie 76' | Stadium: Edgeley Park; Referee: Trevor Kettle |

=== FA Cup ===
| 7 November 2009 First round | Stockport County | 5–0 | Tooting & Mitcham | Stockport |
| 15:00 | Thompson 13'; Poole 20'; Baker 38' (pen.); Turnbull 67', 72' | Report | | Stadium: Edgeley Park; Attendance: 3,076 |

| 15 December 2009 Second round | Stockport County | 0–4 | Torquay United | Macclesfield |
| 19:45 | | Report | Benyon 2', 33', 79'; Rendell 28' | Stadium: Moss Rose; Attendance: 1,690 |

=== League Cup ===
| 11 August 2009 First round | Huddersfield Town | 3–1 | Stockport County | Huddersfield |
| 19.45 | Rhodes 45', 48'; Robinson 74' | Report | Poole 88' | Stadium: Galpharm Stadium; Attendance: 5,120 |

=== Football League Trophy ===
| 1 September 2009 First round | Crewe Alexandra | 1–4 | Stockport County | Crewe |
| 19:00 | Zola 90' | Report | Baker 8', 33', 90'; Bignall 41' | Stadium: Alexandra Stadium; Attendance: 2,331 |

| 6 October 2009 Second round | Port Vale | 3–1 | Stockport County | Stoke-on-Trent |
| 19:00 | Haldane 4'; Dodds 7'; Richards 13' | Report | Bridcutt 22' | Stadium: Vale Park; Attendance: 3,154 |

== Team ==
Due to Stockport starting the season in Administration, the club had to sell some of its best players to accommodate everyday running costs and wage budget. Tommy Rowe was the first to leave after he was bought by Peterborough United for an undisclosed fee 10 days after the previous season ended. Four days later Leon McSweeney left for Hartlepool United on a free transfer

=== Squad ===
| Number | Nationality | Position | Name | Total | | League | | FA Cup | | League Cup | | League Trophy | |
| Number | Nationality | Position | Name | Apps | Goals | Apps | Goals | Apps | Goals | Apps | Goals | Apps | Goals |
|---|---|---|---|---|---|---|---|---|---|---|---|---|---|
| 1 | GK | (Wales) WAL | Owain Fôn Williams | 46 | 0 | 44 | 0 | 2 | 0 | 0 | 0 | 0 | 0 |
| 2 | DF | (England) ENG | Johnny Mullins | 41 | 0 | 36 | 0 | 2 | 0 | 1 | 0 | 2 | 0 |
| 3 | DF | (England) ENG | Michael Rose | 28 | 0 | 24 | 0 | 1 | 0 | 1 | 0 | 2 | 0 |
| 4 | MF | (England) ENG | Paul Turnbull | 35 | 0 | 30 | 0 | 2 | 0 | 1 | 0 | 2 | 0 |
| 5 | MF | (Scotland) SCO | Liam Bridcutt | 19 | 0 | 15 | 0 | 2 | 0 | 0 | 0 | 2 | 0 |
| 6 | DF | (England) ENG | Michael Raynes | 28 | 0 | 25 | 0 | 1 | 0 | 1 | 0 | 1 | 0 |
| 6 | DF | (England) ENG | Paul Huntington | 18 | 0 | 18 | 0 | 0 | 0 | 0 | 0 | 0 | 0 |
| 7 | MF | (England) ENG | James Vincent | 39 | 0 | 34 | 0 | 2 | 0 | 1 | 0 | 2 | 0 |
| 8 | MF | (England) ENG | Greg Tansey | 37 | 0 | 32 | 0 | 2 | 0 | 1 | 0 | 2 | 0 |
| 9 | FW | (Northern Ireland) NIR | Peter Thompson | 27 | 0 | 22 | 0 | 2 | 0 | 1 | 0 | 2 | 0 |
| 10 | MF | (England) ENG | Carl Baker | 24 | 13 | 20 | 9 | 1 | 1 | 1 | 0 | 2 | 3 |
| 11 | FW | (England) ENG | Oli Johnson | 19 | 1 | 16 | 1 | 2 | 0 | 1 | 0 | 0 | 0 |
| 13 | GK | (England) ENG | Paul Gerrard | 2 | 0 | 0 | 0 | 0 | 0 | 1 | 0 | 1 | 0 |
| 14 | MF | (England) ENG | Adam Griffin | 21 | 0 | 18 | 0 | 1 | 0 | 1 | 0 | 1 | 0 |
| 15 | MF | (England) ENG | David Poole | 41 | 1 | 36 | 0 | 2 | 0 | 1 | 1 | 2 | 0 |
| 16 | MF | (England) ENG | Matty Mainwaring | 0 | 0 | 0 | 0 | 0 | 0 | 0 | 0 | 0 | 0 |
| 17 | MF | (England) ENG | Danny Pilkington | 33 | 0 | 29 | 0 | 1 | 0 | 1 | 0 | 2 | 0 |
| 18 | DF | (England) ENG | Andy Halls | 12 | 0 | 11 | 0 | 0 | 0 | 0 | 0 | 1 | 0 |
| 19 | FW | (Ireland) EIR | Declan Edwards | 1 | 0 | 1 | 0 | 0 | 0 | 0 | 0 | 0 | 0 |
| 20 | MF | (England) ENG | Gianluca Havern | 10 | 0 | 7 | 0 | 0 | 0 | 1 | 0 | 2 | 0 |
| 21 | MF | (Wales) WAL | Craig Roberts | 0 | 0 | 0 | 0 | 0 | 0 | 0 | 0 | 0 | 0 |
| 22 | MF | (England) ENG | Daniel Rowe | 4 | 0 | 4 | 0 | 0 | 0 | 0 | 0 | 0 | 0 |
| 23 | GK | (England) ENG | Lloyd Rigby | 3 | 0 | 2 | 0 | 0 | 0 | 0 | 0 | 1 | 0 |
| 24 | FW | (England) ENG | Nicholas Bignall | 13 | 1 | 11 | 0 | 1 | 0 | 0 | 0 | 1 | 1 |
| 25 | DF | (England) ENG | Paul Huntington | 8 | 0 | 8 | 0 | 0 | 0 | 0 | 0 | 0 | 0 |
| 25 | DF | (England) ENG | Christian Ribeiro | 7 | 0 | 7 | 0 | 0 | 0 | 0 | 0 | 0 | 0 |
| 26 | DF | (England) ENG | Sam Barnes | 2 | 0 | 2 | 0 | 0 | 0 | 0 | 0 | 0 | 0 |
| 28 | DF | (England) ENG | Tom Fisher | 2 | 0 | 1 | 0 | 1 | 0 | 0 | 0 | 0 | 0 |
| 30 | DF | (England) ENG | John Disney | 8 | 0 | 8 | 0 | 0 | 0 | 0 | 0 | 0 | 0 |
| 32 | DF | (England) ENG | Matty McNeil | 5 | 0 | 5 | 0 | 0 | 0 | 0 | 0 | 0 | 0 |

== Transfers ==
=== In ===
| Player | From | Date | Fee | Notes |
|---|---|---|---|---|
| (England) Paul Gerrard | Sheffield United | 27 July 2009 | Free | |
| (England) David Poole | Darlington | 1 July 2009 | Free | |
| (England) Gianluca Havern | Mansfield Town | 1 July 2009 | Free | |
| (England) Adam Griffin | Darlington | 1 July 2009 | Free | |
| (England) Paul Huntington | Leeds United | 1 February 2010 | Free | |

=== Out ===
| Player | To | Date | Fee | Notes |
|---|---|---|---|---|
| (England) Tommy Rowe | Peterborough United | 12 May 2009 | Undisclosed | |
| (Republic of Ireland) Leon McSweeney | Hartlepool United | 18 May 2009 | Free | |
| (England) James Tunnicliffe | Brighton & Hove Albion | 25 June 2009 | Free | |
| (Republic of Ireland) Gary Dicker | Brighton & Hove Albion | 25 June 2009 | Free | |
| (England) Dominic Blizzard | Bristol Rovers | 9 July 2009 | Free | |
| (England) Josh Thompson | Celtic | 8 August 2009 | £250,000 | |
| (England) Carl Baker | Coventry City | 8 January 2010 | £300,000 | |
| (England) Oli Johnson | Norwich City | 8 January 2010 | Undisclosed | |
| (England) Michael Rose | Norwich City | 23 January 2010 | Free | |
| (England) Michael Raynes | Scunthorpe United | 1 February 2010 | Undisclosed | |
| (England) Declan Edwards | Northwich Victoria | March 2010 | Released | |
| (Northern Ireland) Peter Thompson | Linfield | 2 July 2010 | Free | |

=== Loans in ===
| Player | From | Start date | Expiry | Notes |
|---|---|---|---|---|
| (Scotland) Liam Bridcutt | Chelsea | 14 August 2009 | 22 September 2009 | |
| (England) Nicholas Bignall | Reading | 31 August 2009 | 3 January 2010 | |
| (England) Paul Huntington | Leeds United | 4 September 2009 | 31 October 2009 | |
| (England) Danny Swailes | MK Dons | 3 January 2010 | 8 May 2010 | |
| (Republic of Ireland) Richie Partridge | MK Dons | 3 January 2010 | 8 May 2010 | |
| (England) David Perkins | Colchester United | 3 January 2010 | 8 May 2010 | |
| (United States) Jemal Johnson | MK Dons | 18 January 2010 | 8 May 2010 | |
| (England) Jabo Ibehre | MK Dons | 18 January 2010 | 8 May 2010 | |
| (England) George Donnelly | Plymouth Argyle | 29 January 2010 | 7 May 2010 | |
| (England) Mat Sadler | Watford | 29 January 2010 | 8 May 2010 | |

=== Loans out ===
| Player | To | Start date | Expiry | Notes |
|---|---|---|---|---|
| (England) Declan Edwards | Northwich Victoria | 15 September 2009 | 15 December 2009 | |
| (Northern Ireland) Peter Thompson | Linfield | January 2010 | Until the end of the Season. | |
