= Oli Johnson =

English footballer (born 1987)

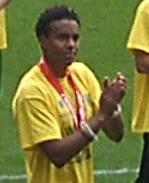
- Johnson following Norwich City's promotion in 2011

Personal information
- Date of birth: 6 November 1987 (age 39)
- Place of birth: Wakefield, England
- Height: 5 ft 11 in (1.80 m)
- Position: Striker

Team information
- Current team: Ossett United FC

Senior career*
Years	Team	Apps	(Gls)
2006–2008	Nostell Miners Welfare		
2008–2010	Stockport County	40	(6)
2010–2012	Norwich City	21	(4)
2011	→ Yeovil Town (loan)	17	(3)
2011	→ Yeovil Town (loan)	6	(0)
2012	Oxford United	17	(3)
2012–2013	York City	4	(0)
2014–2017	Guiseley	66	(13)
2016	→ Bradford Park Avenue (loan)	4	(0)
2017–	Bradford Park Avenue	53	(22)
- * Club domestic league appearances and goals as of 12:23, 3 May 2018 (UTC)

Oliver Tobias M. Johnson (born 6 November 1987) is an English semi-professional footballer who plays as a striker for Bradford Park Avenue.

== Career ==
=== Early career ===
Born in Wakefield, West Yorkshire, Johnson played in the Wakefield & District Sunday League with Shepherds Arms before starting his career with Nostell Miners Welfare in the Northern Counties East Football League Division One, the 10th tier of English football. His first goal of the 2006–07 season came with Nostell's opening goal in a 4–2 victory over AFC Emley on 21 October 2006. He finished the season with four goals as Nostell were promoted to the Northern Counties East Football League Premier Division. Johnson scored nine goals during the 2007–08 season.

=== Stockport County ===
After catching the attention of Stockport County during a pre-season friendly, he joined the League One club on 17 October 2008 after impressing on trial, signing a contract until the end of the 2008–09 season. He made his debut as part of a 2–1 loss against Colchester United. He made an instant impact at Stockport, scoring four goals in his first four starts for the club, including the winner against Cheltenham Town at Edgeley Park.

=== Norwich City ===
Johnson signed for Norwich City on a two-and-a-half-year contract for an undisclosed fee on 8 January 2010 and made his debut coming on as a late substitute in Norwich's 3–1 victory over Exeter City the following day. He scored his first goal for the club a week later in the 5–0 away victory against Colchester United.

Johnson joined Yeovil Town on an initial one-month loan on 14 January 2011, and made his debut as a substitute in the 1–0 win against Swindon Town on 15 January. His first goal for the club came against Brentford, helping Yeovil to a 2–1 win. He scored twice more for the club, including a volley in a 1–0 win against Tranmere Rovers. On 9 January 2012, Johnson's contract with Norwich was terminated by mutual consent.

=== Oxford United ===
Johnson joined Oxford United of League Two on 20 January 2012 on a contract until the end of the season. He scored his first goal for the club in a 2–1 home victory over Dagenham & Redbridge. In May 2012, Johnson was released after being deemed surplus to requirements.

=== York City ===
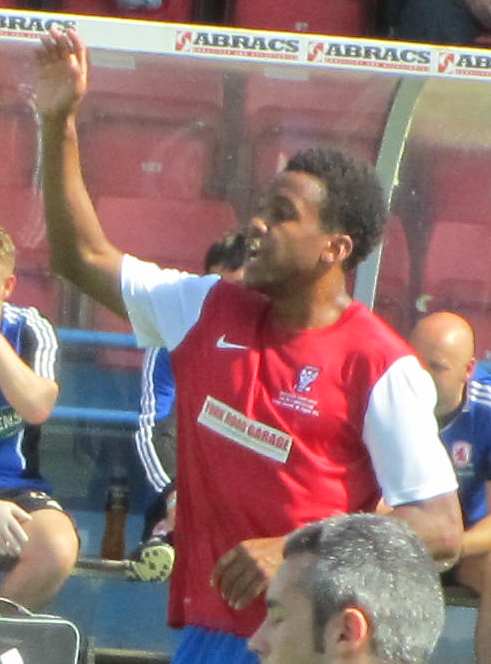
Johnson playing for York City in 2012

Johnson signed for newly promoted League Two side York City on a one-year contract on 26 June 2012. He made his debut as an 89th-minute substitute in York's 2–0 win away at Aldershot Town on 29 September 2012. Having suffered from stomach and groin problems, he was released by York on 28 February 2013, after making seven appearances for the club.

=== Guiseley ===
Johnson signed for Guiseley in the 2013–14 season and despite picking up numerous injuries, made several substitute appearances including a man-of-the-match performance against Colwyn Bay on 19 April 2014. In the 2014–15 season, Johnson became a key player for the club en route to promotion to the top level of non-league football, providing numerous match-winning displays most notably in the 3–0 away victory over former club Stockport County.

== Career statistics ==
As of match played 16 December 2017

Appearances and goals by club, season and competition
Club	Season	League			FA Cup		League Cup		Other		Total	
Club	Season	Division	Apps	Goals	Apps	Goals	Apps	Goals	Apps	Goals	Apps	Goals
Stockport County	2008–09	League One	24	5	0	0	0	0	0	0	24	5
Stockport County	2009–10	League One	16	1	2	0	1	0	0	0	19	1
Stockport County	Total		40	6	2	0	1	0	0	0	43	6
Norwich City	2009–10	League One	17	4	—		—		—		17	4
Norwich City	2010–11	Championship	4	0	0	0	2	0	—		6	0
Norwich City	Total		21	4	0	0	2	0	—		23	4
Yeovil Town (loan)	2010–11	League One	17	3	—		—		—		17	3
Yeovil Town (loan)	2011–12	League One	6	0	2	0	0	0	1 (Note: Appearances in the Football League Trophy)	0	9	0
Yeovil Town (loan)	Total		23	3	2	0	—		1	0	26	3
Oxford United	2011–12	League Two	17	3	—		—		—		17	3
York City	2012–13	League Two	4	0	2	0	0	0	1	0	7	0
Guiseley	2013–14	Conference North	12	1	0	0	—		3 (Note: Appearances in the Conference North play-offs)	1	15	2
Guiseley	2014–15	Conference North	31	8	0	0	—		4 (Note: One appearance in the FA Trophy, three in the Conference North play-offs)	0	35	8
Guiseley	2015–16	National League	12	2	0	0	—		0	0	12	2
Guiseley	2016–17	National League	11	2	1	0	—		1 (Note: Appearance in the FA Trophy)	0	13	2
Guiseley	Total		66	13	1	0	—		8	1	75	14
Bradford Park Avenue (loan)	2016–17	National League North	4	0	—		—		0	0	4	0
Bradford Park Avenue	2016–17	National League North	13	5	—		—		0	0	13	5
Bradford Park Avenue	2017–18	National League North	21	11	0	0	—		0	0	21	11
Bradford Park Avenue	Total		34	16	0	0	0	0	0	0	34	16
Career total			209	45	7	0	3	0	10	1	229	46

== Honours ==
Norwich City

- Football League One: 2009–10

Guiseley

- Conference North play-offs: 2015

Individual

- Conference North Team of the Year: 2014–15
