= Carl Baker =

English footballer

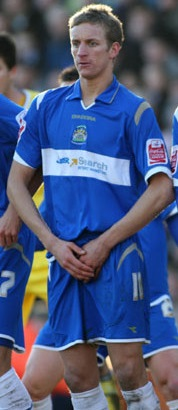
- Baker playing for Stockport County in 2011

Personal information
- Full name: Carl Paul Baker
- Date of birth: 26 December 1982 (age 43)
- Place of birth: Prescot, England
- Positions: Winger; attacking midfielder

Youth career
- Liverpool

Senior career*
Years	Team	Apps	(Gls)
2003	Prescot Cables		
2003–2007	Southport	130	(31)
2007–2008	Morecambe	42	(10)
2008–2010	Stockport County	42	(12)
2010–2014	Coventry City	160	(21)
2014–2016	Milton Keynes Dons	66	(12)
2016–2017	Portsmouth	47	(9)
2017	ATK	0	(0)
2018	Coventry City	0	(0)
2018–2019	Nuneaton Borough	16	(1)
2019–2020	Brackley Town	34	(6)
2020–2021	Nuneaton Borough	12	(5)
2021–2023	AFC Telford United	22	(1)
2023	Quorn	2	(0)
Total		573	(108)

International career
2006–2007	England C	2	(0)
- * Club domestic league appearances and goals

Carl Paul Baker (born 26 December 1982) is an English former professional footballer who played as a winger or as an attacking midfielder.

He made over 350 career appearances in the Football League, including 160 appearances for Coventry City.

Born on 26 December 1982 in Prescot, Merseyside, Baker came up through the Liverpool Academy before moving to Prescot Cables. Shortly after, he moved to Southport in 2003, with whom he helped win the Conference North title. An impressive four-year spell saw him earn a move into the Football League with Morecambe, where he found the net 11 times in 48 appearances. Two years at Stockport County followed prior to completing a switch to then-Championship club Coventry City in the summer of 2010. He went on to play 182 times for the Sky Blues and was captain for the final two years of his four-year stay. In September 2014, he signed for Milton Keynes Dons after being released by Coventry. Baker signed for Portsmouth in June 2016. He signed with Indian Super League franchise ATK in the following year but was released without playing a match due to an injury which ruled him out for the entire season. In March 2018, Carl returned to Coventry City on a short-term deal until the end of the season, before concluding his career in non-league football.

On November 21, 2021, Baker was appointed assistant manager at AFC Telford United alongside manager Paul Carden.

He has represented England at semi-professional level playing for England C.

== Club career ==
Born in Prescot, Merseyside, Baker started his career with Liverpool at schoolboy level before playing for Prescot Cables. He signed for Southport in 2003.

=== Southport ===
Baker's career was forged at Southport. Spotted playing for Prescot by Southport manager Liam Watson, Baker was quickly snapped up by the Merseyside club, and soon established himself as one of non-league's exciting talents. He was an important member of the Southport Conference North Championship winning team in the 2004–05 season. In 2005, he was a member of the Middlesex Wanderers F.C. that visited Japan.

After again playing an important role in helping keep Southport in the Conference National in the 2005–06 season, Baker signed his first full-time contract, for the next season as the club turned fully professional, whilst much of the championship winning, and relegation surviving team, (fan favourites Steve Dickinson, Steve Daly, Earl Davis) all not willing to leave their non-footballing jobs, left unable to make the transition to full-time.

Despite Southport's relegation from the Conference National in the 2006–07 season, Baker swept the board with Player of the Year awards, voted on by his fellow players, the fans and local press. He was a fan favourite with the club's fans, being one of only two players left from the 2005 title winning squad. Although only on a year's contract meaning he could move on for free, the club's official website announced he had signed for another year at the club. This meant that any interested team would have to pay for his services.

=== Morecambe ===
On 11 July 2007, he signed for Football League Two newcomers Morecambe for a club record, though undisclosed fee. He signed a three-year contract with Morecambe. In August 2007 Baker scored Morecambe's first goal when they beat Football League Championship club Wolverhampton Wanderers 3–1 in extra time in a League Cup match.

In November, Baker was named North West Non-league player of the year, at the North West Football Awards, for his efforts playing for Southport in 2006–07, beating his new Morecambe teammate Adam Yates to the prize.

=== Stockport County ===
On 22 July 2008, Baker signed a three-year contract at Stockport County, with the club paying Morecambe a £175,000 fee.

His 2008–09 season was a in-different one for Baker, he played 27 times for County in his first season, scoring 3 goals, all these were before January, when Baker received a knee injury which required surgery.

The 2009–10 season started well for Baker on the pitch and he was seen to be one of Stockport's main assets. By mid-October he was County's leading scorer with 10 goals. Baker became the first County player to score successive away hat-tricks, with stunning performances against Brighton & Hove Albion & Crewe. Baker scored his 10th goal-of-the-season for Stockport from the penalty spot in the game away to Tranmere Rovers, which was live on Sky – dedicating the goal to his brother Mike whose name he bears on his shirt collar.

Baker added to his goals tally by scoring a penalty in the game against Tooting & Mitcham.

On 26 December 2009, Gary Ablett told reporters that Baker has signed a deal with Championship side Coventry City. Baker's last game for Stockport County was against League 1 leaders Leeds United in which he scored a freekick. The goal was his 13th goal of the season.

=== Coventry City ===
Coventry confirmed Baker as the club's fourth permanent signing in the January 2010 transfer window on 8 January 2010. Baker joined Coventry for an undisclosed fee, which was confirmed by him in person as being £300,000. In February 2010, Manager Chris Coleman praised Baker for his impressive performances since joining the club, likening his playing style to that of Sky Blue legend Tommy Hutchinson. On 10 August 2010, Baker returned to former club Morecambe, in a League Cup First Round tie. Coventry fell to a 2–0 defeat. The Sky Blues made up for their 2010 cup loss to Morecambe by beating them 2–1 in the 2012–13 FA Cup 2nd Round. Baker scored the winning goal curling the ball round Morecambe keeper Barry Roche just 18 seconds into the second half. During his time at the club he became a fan favourite due to his consistently skillful and dedicated performances, and was club captain for more than two years from 2012 to 2014.

Baker had his Coventry City contract cancelled by mutual consent on 1 September 2014.

=== Milton Keynes Dons ===
On 26 September 2014, following his release from Coventry City, fellow League One side Milton Keynes Dons announced Baker had signed for the club, and made his debut on 4 October 2014 in a 0–2 away win against Yeovil Town. Baker scored his first goal for his new club on 8 November 2014 in the FA Cup first round 3–4 away win against Port Vale. Baker also scored his first league goal for the club, again against Port Vale a week later in a 1–0 home win.

On 22 April 2015 Baker scored twice in the 3–0 home win against Doncaster Rovers.

On 28 April 2015 at the club's end of season awards ceremony, Baker was named Player of the Year 2014–15, voted for by supporters of the club.

On 3 May 2015 Baker scored on the final day of the 2014–15 League One season in a 5–1 home win against Yeovil Town, achieving promotion with Milton Keynes Dons to the Football League Championship.

=== Portsmouth ===
Baker signed a 2-year deal with Portsmouth in June 2016, having previously worked with manager Paul Cook at Southport. He scored on his debut in a 1–1 draw with Carlisle United on 6 August 2016.

=== ATK ===
On 4 September 2017, Baker moved abroad, signing for Indian Super League franchise ATK. After suffering an injury during the pre-season, he was ruled out of play for the entire season. He was subsequently replaced by Ryan Taylor.

=== Return to Coventry City ===
On 9 March 2018, Carl returned to Coventry City on a short-term deal. On 4 May 2018, it was announced that Carl had left the club by mutual consent due to injury; during this second spell with the club he was unable to make an appearance.

=== Nuneaton Borough ===
On 31 August 2018, Nuneaton Borough announced that Baker had signed for the club. He made his début for Nuneaton Borough in a 1–0 win at Curzon Ashton the following day. He left the club in January 2019.

=== Brackley Town ===
After his departure from Nuneaton Borough, Baker joined fellow National League North club Brackley Town. He scored twice on his home debut, against Bradford Park Avenue on 26 January 2019.

=== Return to Nuneaton ===
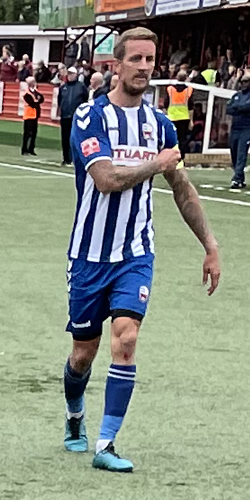
Baker playing for Nuneaton Borough in August 2021.

On 30 July 2020, he re-signed for Southern Football League Premier Division side Nuneaton Borough, at the age of 37.

=== AFC Telford United ===
On 26 November 2021, he was appointed as assistant manager to Paul Carden at National League North side AFC Telford United and also continued to feature as a player.

=== Quorn ===
In February 2023, Baker signed for Quorn.

== International career ==
In November 2005 Baker was called up to the England C squad, but was recalled by Southport due to an FA Cup replay against Woking. However, he was called up again for a match against Italy on 15 February 2006, which England won 3–1. He played for England C in their 1–0 win over Finland on 1 June 2007.

== Personal life ==
On 21 August 2006, Baker pleaded guilty at North Sefton Magistrates Court to failing to provide a specimen for analysis, after he had been stopped on 13 August by police in Southport, who suspected Baker had been drink driving. Magistrates disqualified him from driving. Baker made a public apology.

In October 2006 he was suspended for a week and fined by Southport for what was described as a "serious breach of club discipline".

On 16 September 2009 it was confirmed that Baker's older brother (Michael) had died of leukaemia; despite that Carl went on to play just two days later and score 2 goals in Stockport's 2–2 draw with Yeovil Town; his other brother has also been diagnosed with leukaemia. At the end of the Yeovil game Carl was presented with a card signed by the travelling Stockport fans.

After retiring from professional football, Baker became a professional golf caddie for Robert Rock.

== Career statistics ==
Appearances and goals by club, season and competition
Club	Season	League			National cup		League cup		Other		Total	
Club	Season	Division	Apps	Goals	Apps	Goals	Apps	Goals	Apps	Goals	Apps	Goals
Southport	2003–04	Northern Premier League Premier Division	23	5	0	0	—		5 (Note: One appearance in FA Trophy, one appearance in Northern Premier League Challenge Cup, three appearances three goals in Liverpool Senior Cup)	3	28	8
Southport	2004–05	Conference North	31	8	2	0	—		9 (Note: Five appearances in FA Trophy, one appearance in Conference League Cup, one appearance in Liverpool Senior Cup, two appearances in Lancashire Junior Cup)	0	42	8
Southport	2005–06	Conference National	36	7	3	0	—		4 (Note: One appearance in FA Trophy, one appearance in Liverpool Senior Cup, two appearances in Lancashire Junior Cup)	0	43	7
Southport	2006–07	Conference National	40	11	1	0	—		4 (Note: Two appearances one goal in FA Trophy, one appearance in Liverpool Senior Cup, one appearance in Lancashire Junior Cup)	1	45	12
Southport	Total		130	31	6	0	—		22	4	158	35
Morecambe	2007–08	League Two	42	10	1	0	3	1	2 (Note: Appearances in Football League Trophy)	0	48	11
Stockport County	2008–09	League One	22	3	2	0	1	0	2	0	27	3
Stockport County	2009–10	League One	20	9	1	1	1	0	2	3	24	13
Stockport County	Total		42	12	3	1	2	0	4	3	51	16
Coventry City	2009–10	Championship	22	0	0	0	0	0	—		22	0
Coventry City	2010–11	Championship	32	1	2	1	1	0	—		35	2
Coventry City	2011–12	Championship	26	1	1	0	0	0	—		27	1
Coventry City	2012–13	League One	43	12	3	1	3	1	6	1	55	15
Coventry City	2013–14	League One	37	7	5	2	1	1	0	0	43	10
Coventry City	Total		160	21	11	4	5	2	6	1	182	28
Milton Keynes Dons	2014–15	League One	32	9	2	1	0	0	1	0	35	10
Milton Keynes Dons	2015–16	Championship	34	3	0	0	3	2	—		37	5
Milton Keynes Dons	Total		66	12	2	1	3	2	1	0	72	15
Portsmouth	2016–17	League Two	45	9	1	0	0	0	0	0	46	9
Portsmouth	2017–18	League One	2	0	0	0	1	0	1	0	4	0
Portsmouth	Total		47	9	1	0	1	0	1	0	50	9
ATK	2017–18	Indian Super League	0	0	0	0	—		0	0	0	0
Coventry City	2017–18	League Two	0	0	0	0	0	0	0	0	0	0
Nuneaton Borough	2018–19	National League North	16	1	0	0	—		0	0	16	1
Brackley Town	2018–19	National League North	15	6	0	0	—		1 (Note: Appearances in National League North play-offs)	0	16	6
Brackley Town	2019–20	National League North	19	0	1	0	—		1	0	21	0
Brackley Town	Total		34	6	1	0	—		2	0	37	6
Nuneaton Borough	2020–21	Southern League Premier Division Central	1	0	1	0	—		2 (Note: Appearances in FA Trophy)	2	4	2
Nuneaton Borough	2021–22	Southern League Premier Division Central	11	5	2	0	—		3 (Note: Two appearances in FA Trophy, one appearance one goal in Southern League Cup)	1	16	6
Nuneaton Borough	Total		12	5	3	0	—		5	3	20	8
AFC Telford United	2021–22	National League North	15	1	0	0	—		0	0	15	1
AFC Telford United	2022–23	National League North	7	0	0	0	—		0	0	7	0
AFC Telford United	Total		22	1	0	0	—		0	0	22	1
Quorn	2022–23	United Counties League Premier Division North	2	0	0	0	—		0	0	2	0
Career total			573	108	28	6	14	5	43	11	658	130

== Honours ==
Southport

- Conference North: 2004–05

Milton Keynes Dons

- Football League One second-place promotion: 2014–15

Portsmouth

- EFL League Two: 2016–17

Individual

- Southport Player of the Year: 2006–07
- Coventry City Player of the Year: 2012–13
- Football League One Player of the Month: November 2014
- Milton Keynes Dons Player of the Year: 2014–15
