= Danny Pilkington =

English footballer

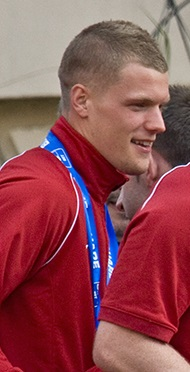
- Pilkington with the victory parade that followed York City's victory in the 2012 Conference Premier play-off final

Personal information
- Full name: Daniel Luke Pilkington
- Date of birth: 25 May 1990 (age 36)
- Place of birth: Blackburn, England
- Height: 5 ft 9 in (1.75 m)
- Position: Winger

Senior career*
Years	Team	Apps	(Gls)
- Atherton Collieries
- Kendal Town
–2008	Chorley		
2008–2011	Stockport County	38	(1)
2011–2012	York City	18	(2)
2012–2013	Kidderminster Harriers	25	(2)
2013–2014	Hereford United	13	(0)
2014–2016	Barrow	25	(6)
2016–?	Stalybridge Celtic	6	(0)
2016–2017	→ Hyde United (loan)	11	(2)
- * Club domestic league appearances and goals as of 18:34, 31 August 2015 (UTC)

Daniel Luke Pilkington (born 25 May 1990) is an English semi-professional footballer who plays as a winger. He previously played for Atherton Collieries, Kendal Town, Chorley, Stockport County, York City, Kidderminster Harriers, Hereford United, Barrow and Stalybridge Celtic.

== Career ==
Born in Blackburn, Lancashire, Pilkington is the younger brother of Irish international footballer Anthony Pilkington. He started out with Myerscough College, which has a reputation for developing football talents, before playing for Atherton Collieries, Kendal Town and Chorley. He signed for Stockport County on a professional contract 3 July 2008 to progress in their under-21 Development squad. He made his debut as a substitute against Hereford United on 31 January 2009. He left Stockport at the end of January 2011 after his contract was cancelled by mutual consent.

He went on trial with Chesterfield and scored against Alfreton Town in a pre-season friendly on 15 July 2011 in a 4–1 win, although he was not offered a contract by the club. Pilkington signed for Conference Premier club York City on non-contract terms on 19 August 2011 following a trial. After coming on as an 89th-minute substitute for Jason Walker to make his debut away at Kettering Town on 23 August 2011, he scored a goal in the 94th minute to finish the game at 5–1. His first start for York came on 13 September 2011 against Bath City in a 1–0 victory at home. He finished the 2011–12 season with 22 appearances and two goals for York, but was not involved in the side's successful play-off campaign.

Pilkington signed a one-year contract with Conference Premier side Kidderminster Harriers on 19 June 2012 after his contract with York expired. He made his debut in Kidderminster's 1–0 win over Lincoln City on 11 August 2012, before scoring his first goal in a 1–1 draw away to Barrow on 1 September. He signed for Conference Premier rivals Hereford United on 19 June 2013.

Pilkington signed for Conference North team Barrow on 16 July 2014.

== Career statistics ==
As of match played 8 February 2021

Appearances and goals by club, season and competition
Club	Season	League			FA Cup		League Cup		Other		Total	
Club	Season	Division	Apps	Goals	Apps	Goals	Apps	Goals	Apps	Goals	Apps	Goals
Stockport County	2008–09	League One	3	0	0	0	0	0	0	0	3	0
Stockport County	2009–10	League One	29	1	1	0	1	0	2 (Note: Appearances in Football League Trophy)	0	33	1
Stockport County	2010–11	League Two	6	0	0	0	1	0	0	0	7	0
Stockport County	Total		38	1	1	0	2	0	2	0	43	1
York City	2011–12	Conference Premier	18	2	0	0	—		4 (Note: Appearances in FA Trophy)	0	22	2
Kidderminster Harriers	2012–13	Conference Premier	25	2	1	0	—		2 (Note: One appearance in FA Trophy, one in Conference Premier play-offs)	1	29	3
Hereford United	2013–14	Conference Premier	13	0	0	0	—		0	0	13	0
Barrow	2014–15	Conference North	24	6	0	0	—		0	0	24	6
Barrow	2015–16	National League	24	1	0	0	—		0	0	24	1
	Total		48	7	0	0	—		0	0	48	7
Stalybridge Celtic	2016–17	Conference North	16	3	0	0			0	0	16	3
Hyde United (loan)	2016–17	NPL North West	11	2	0	0			0	0	11	2
Ashton United	2017–18	Northern Premier	16	2	0	0			0	0	16	2
Clitheroe	2020–present	NPL North West	5	0	0	0			1	0	6	0
Career total			191	19	2	0	2	0	8	1	204	20
