= Tom Fisher (footballer) =

English footballer (born 1992)

Personal information
- Full name: Thomas Michael Fisher
- Date of birth: 28 June 1992 (age 34)
- Place of birth: Wythenshawe, England
- Height: 1.78 m (5 ft 10 in)
- Position: Striker

Youth career
- 2005–2009: Stockport County

Senior career*
Years	Team	Apps	(Gls)
2009–2011	Stockport County	29	(1)
2011–2012	Macclesfield Town	1	(0)
2011	→ Hyde (loan)	6	(1)
2012	→ Droylsden (loan)	9	(1)
2012	Droylsden	3	(0)
2012–2013	FC United of Manchester	7	(0)
2016	Mossley		
2018	Mossley		
- * Club domestic league appearances and goals

Thomas Michael Fisher (born 28 June 1992) is an English footballer who plays as a striker. He has previously played for Stockport County and Macclesfield Town, FC United of Manchester, Mossley and had loan spells at Hyde and Droylsden

== Club career ==
=== Stockport County ===
Born in Wythenshawe, Manchester, Fisher started his career with Stockport County and made his debut on 24 April 2009, coming on as an 89th-minute substitute as part of the 4–3 victory over Crewe Alexandra. Fisher scored his first goal in professional football in Stockport's 2–2 draw with Accrington Stanley on 28 September 2010. On 19 May 2011 Stockport announced they had released Fisher following their relegation from the Football League. He made 31 appearances and scored one goal in all competitions. In May 2011 it was announced by the club for the 2011–12 season that he had been released.

=== Macclesfield Town ===
Later that summer Fisher was handed a trial by Macclesfield Town. After impressing in the trial he signed on a one-year contract with Macclesfield.

On 4 November 2011, he was loaned out to Conference North side Hyde on an initial one-month loan deal. He made his debut just a day later in a 4–0 home win over Histon. He scored his first goal for the club on his fifth appearance in a 3–2 win over Colwyn Bay, coming on as a second-half substitute. His winning goal was described as a 'screamer'. In December 2011, after six league appearances, one FA Trophy appearance and one goal, he returned to Macclesfield.

He was one of sixteen players released by the club at the end of the season.

=== Droylsden ===
In the summer of 2012 he signed for Droylsden before leaving the club in September, having been released.

=== FC United of Manchester ===
In October 2012 he joined FC United of Manchester.

== Career statistics ==
As of 12 November 2011.

Club	Season	League^{[A]}		FA Cup		League Cup		Other^{[B]}		Total	
Club	Season	Apps	Goals	Apps	Goals	Apps	Goals	Apps	Goals	Apps	Goals
Stockport County	2008–09	1	0	0	0	0	0	0	0	1	0
Stockport County	2009–10	1	0	1	0	0	0	0	0	2	0
Stockport County	2010–11	27	1	0	0	1	0	0	0	28	1
Stockport County	Total	29	1	1	0	1	0	0	0	31	1
Macclesfield Town	2011–12	0	0	0	0	0	0	0	0	0	0
Hyde (loan)	2011–12	6	1	0	0	0	0	1	0	7	1
Droylsden (loan)	2011–12	9	1	0	0	0	0	0	0	9	1
Droylsden	2012–13	3	0	0	0	0	0	0	0	3	0
Career totals		47	3	1	0	1	0	1	0	50	3

== Footnotes ==
A. The "League" column constitutes appearances and goals (including those as a substitute) in the Football League and Football Conference.
B. The "Other" column constitutes appearances and goals (including those as a substitute) in the Football League Trophy.
