= Chris Coward =

English footballer

Personal information
- Full name: Christopher Coward
- Date of birth: 23 July 1989 (age 37)
- Place of birth: Crumpsall, Manchester, England
- Position: Striker

Youth career
- Stockport County

Senior career*
Years	Team	Apps	(Gls)
2005–2008	Stockport County	1	(1)
2007	→ Northwich Victoria (loan)	1	(0)
2007	→ Ashton United (loan)	4	(1)
2008–2009	Hyde United	3	(0)
- * Club domestic league appearances and goals as of 16:39, 13 June 2009 (UTC)

Chris Coward (born 23 July 1989) is an English footballer and brother to Andrew Coward, an actor that performed in The Jersey Boys musical. He came up through the Centre of Excellence youth system at Stockport County, where he became the youngest ever player to play in the Football League Cup aged 16 years and one month. He played for Northwich Victoria and Ashton United on loan, but was released by Stockport in June 2008. He played for Hyde United during the 2008–09 season.
