= Paul Turnbull =

English footballer

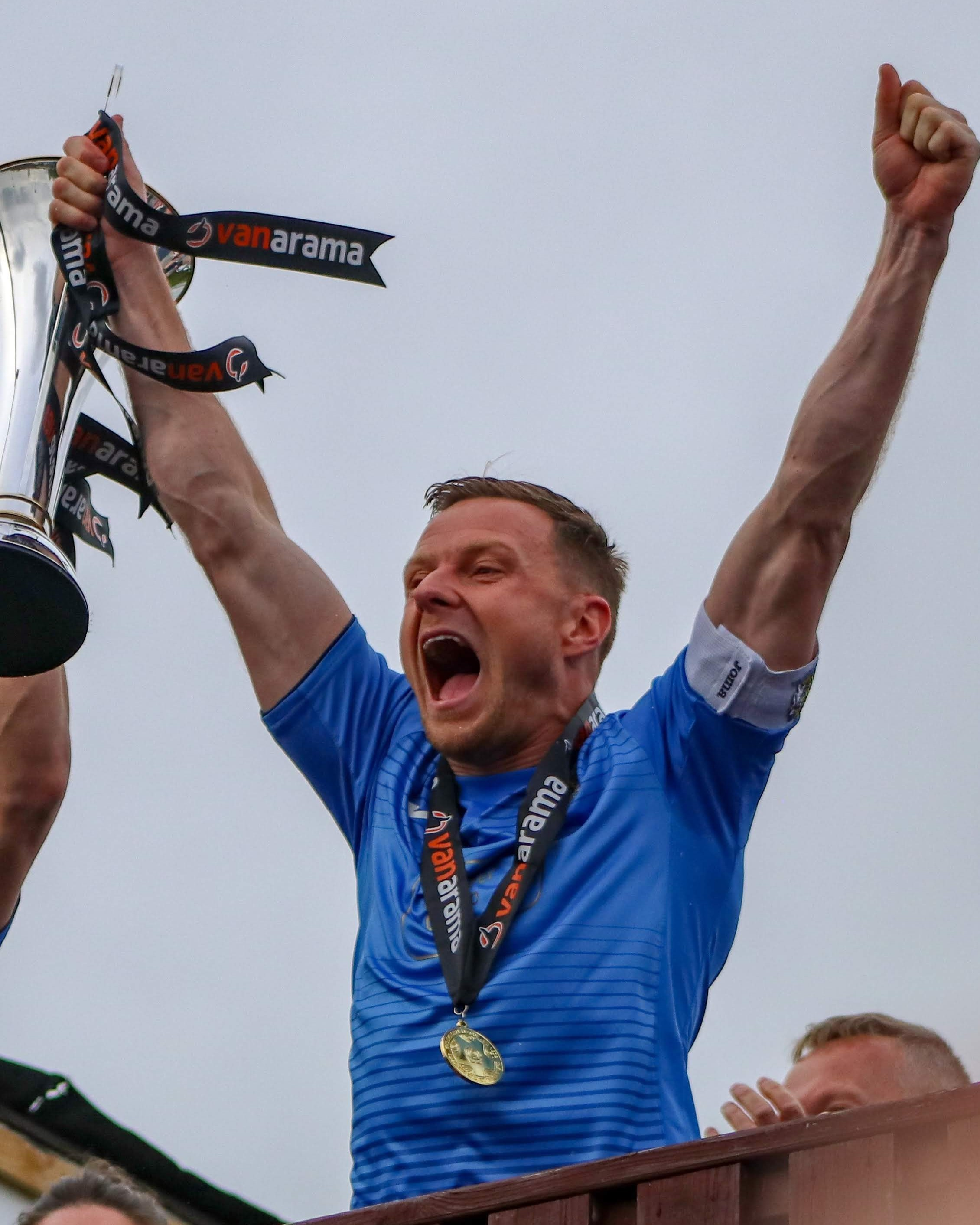
- Turnbull lifting the National League North trophy in 2019

Personal information
- Full name: Paul Daniel Turnbull
- Date of birth: 23 January 1989 (age 37)
- Place of birth: Handforth, England
- Height: 6 ft 0 in (1.83 m)
- Position: Midfielder

Team information
- Current team: Cheadle Town (player-manager)

Youth career
- 2000–2005: Stockport County

Senior career*
Years	Team	Apps	(Gls)
2005–2011	Stockport County	125	(7)
2008	→ Altrincham (loan)	6	(0)
2011–2013	Northampton Town	14	(0)
2012	→ Stockport County (loan)	14	(0)
2012	→ Stockport County (loan)	12	(2)
2013	→ Lincoln City (loan)	15	(0)
2013–2016	Macclesfield Town	112	(9)
2016–2017	Barrow	31	(3)
2017–2018	Chester	21	(0)
2018–2020	Stockport County	66	(3)
2020–2021	Curzon Ashton	15	(0)
2021–2026	Stockport Town	95	(10)
2026–	Cheadle Town		

Managerial career
- 2022–2026: Stockport Town
- 2026–: Cheadle Town
- * Club domestic league appearances and goals as of 13:52, 23 September 2024 (UTC)

Paul Daniel Turnbull (born 23 January 1989) is an English footballer who plays as a midfielder. He is currently player manager of Cheadle Town.

== Club career ==
=== Stockport County ===
Born in Handforth, Cheshire, Turnbull progressed through the Stockport County Centre of Excellence youth system where he trained as a striker, although he later adapted to playing in the centre of midfield . He became the youngest player to play league football in Stockport County's history, when he came off the bench against Wrexham on 30 April 2005, aged 16 years 97 days and still a school student at Wilmslow High School.

On 21 December 2007, Turnbull extended his contract at Edgeley Park until summer 2009, following a number of regular first team appearances. He started 16 games for Stockport in the 2007–08 season before joining Conference National club Altrincham on loan in March 2008, where he made six appearances. He returned from loan and impressed manager Jim Gannon so much that he played all of the clubs playoff games at the end of the season, including the final at Wembley Stadium.

Turnbull became a regular in the 2008–09 season and scored the first senior goal of his career in Stockport's 3–1 victory over Oldham Athletic on 3 October 2008.

In the 2010–11 season he was made club captain by Stockport manager Paul Simpson at the age of 21.

=== Northampton Town ===
In May 2011 he was offered a new one-year deal by the club although in June 2011 Stockport agreed a fee with Northampton Town and agreed permission for Turnbull to talk to the club, with a view to agreeing personal terms and on 29 June the club confirmed he had signed for Northampton.

On 23 January 2012 he rejoined Stockport County on loan. On 21 September 2012 he rejoined Stockport County again on loan until 22 December. In January 2013, he joined Lincoln City on loan for the remainder of the season.

=== Macclesfield Town ===
In July 2013 he joined Macclesfield Town after being released by Northampton Town.

=== Barrow ===
After refusing a new contract at Macclesfield Town, Turnbull joined Barrow on 7 June 2016.

=== Chester ===
In July 2017 he joined Chester on a two-year deal, but off the field money issues at Chester meant Paul cut his spell there short.

=== Stockport County ===
Paul rejoined his boyhood team Stockport County and was a crucial part of their 2018/2019 National League North winning campaign.

=== Later career ===
After leaving Stockport County, Paul joined National League North Curzon Ashton for the 2020/21 season, before joining Stockport Town in North West Counties Division One South in July 2021. He later became player manager of Stockport Town and an academy coach at Stockport County.

In May 2026, Turnbull joined Cheadle Town as player-manager.

== Career statistics ==
As of 22 September 2024

Appearances and goals by club, season and competition
Club	Season	League			FA Cup		League Cup		Other		Total	
Club	Season	Division	Apps	Goals	Apps	Goals	Apps	Goals	Apps	Goals	Apps	Goals
Stockport County	2004–05	League One	1	0	0	0	0	0	0	0	1	0
Stockport County	2005–06	League Two	0	0	0	0	0	0	0	0	0	0
Stockport County	2006–07	League Two	0	0	0	0	0	0	0	0	0	0
Stockport County	2007–08	League Two	19	0	2	0	0	0	6 (Note: Three appearances in Football League Trophy, three appearances in League Two play-offs)	0	27	0
Stockport County	2008–09	League One	34	2	1	0	1	0	2 (Note: Appearance(s) in Football League Trophy)	0	38	2
Stockport County	2009–10	League One	30	0	2	2	1	0	2	0	35	2
Stockport County	2010–11	League Two	41	5	2	0	1	0	1	0	45	5
Stockport County	Total		125	7	7	2	3	0	11	0	146	9
Altrincham (loan)	2007–08	Conference Premier	6	0	—		—		0	0	6	0
Northampton Town	2011–12	League Two	14	0	1	0	2	1	1	0	18	1
Northampton Town	2012–13	League Two	0	0	—		0	0	1	0	1	0
Northampton Town	Total		14	0	1	0	2	1	2	0	19	1
Stockport County (loan)	2011–12	Conference Premier	14	0	—		—		0	0	14	0
Stockport County (loan)	2012–13	Conference Premier	12	2	1	0	—		0	0	13	2
Stockport County (loan)	Total		26	2	1	0	—		0	0	27	2
Lincoln City (loan)	2012–13	Conference Premier	15	0	—		—		0	0	15	0
Macclesfield Town	2013–14	Conference Premier	37	4	5	0	—		0	0	42	4
Macclesfield Town	2014–15	Conference Premier	37	4	2	1	—		0	0	39	5
Macclesfield Town	2015–16	National League	38	1	2	1	—		4 (Note: Appearance(s) in FA Trophy)	0	44	2
Macclesfield Town	Total		112	9	9	2	—		4	0	125	11
Barrow	2016–17	National League	31	2	1	1	—		3	0	35	3
Chester	2017–18	National League	21	0	1	0	—		3 (Note: Two appearances in FA Trophy, one appearance in Cheshire Senior Cup)	0	25	0
Stockport County	2017–18	National League North	9	0	—		—		1 (Note: Appearance(s) in National League North play-offs)	0	10	0
Stockport County	2018–19	National League North	27	2	0	0	—		6	0	33	2
Stockport County	2019–20	National League	30	1	1	0	—		3	0	34	1
Stockport County	Total		66	3	1	0	—		10	0	77	3
Curzon Ashton	2020–21	National League North	15	0	0	0	—		1	0	16	0
Stockport Town	2021–22	NWCFL Division One South	28	5	0	0	0	0	0	0	28	5
Stockport Town	2022–23	NWCFL Division One South	37	4	0	0	1	0	2 (Note: One appearance in FA Vase, one appearance in NWCFL First Division Challenge Cup)	1	40	5
Stockport Town	2023–24	NWCFL Division One South	26	1	1	0	0	0	4 (Note: One appearance and one goal in FA Vase, one appearance in Cheshire Senior Cup, two appearances in NWCFL Division One South play-offs)	1	31	2
Stockport Town	2024–25	NWCFL Premier Division	4	0	0	0	0	0	1 (Note: Appearance(s) in FA Vase)	0	5	0
Stockport Town	Total		95	10	1	0	1	0	7	2	104	12
Career total			526	33	22	5	6	1	41	2	595	41

== Managerial statistics ==
As of match played 22 September 2024

Managerial record by team and tenure
Team	From	To	Record					Ref
Team	From	To	P	W	D	L	Win %	Ref
Stockport Town	28 January 2022	present	120	69	21	30	57.5	
Total			120	69	21	30	57.5	

== Honours ==
Stockport County

- Football League Two play-offs: 2008
- National League North: 2018–19
