= Daniel Ellis (footballer, born 1988) =

English footballer

Dan Ellis
Personal information
- Full name: Daniel Ellis
- Date of birth: 18 November 1988 (age 38)
- Place of birth: Stockport, England
- Position: Forward

Youth career
- Stockport County

Senior career*
Years	Team	Apps	(Gls)
2005–2008	Stockport County	12	(0)
2008	→ Droylsden (loan)	12	(4)
- * Club domestic league appearances and goals as of June 2008

Daniel Ellis (born 18 November 1988) is an English footballer who played in the Football League for Stockport County. He plays as a forward.

Ellis was born in Stockport. He progressed through Stockport County's Centre of Excellence youth system to make his first-team debut as a substitute in a 3–1 win over Shrewsbury Town in League Two on 22 April 2006. In 2008, he spent time on loan to Conference National club Droylsden. He was released by Stockport at the end of the 2007–08 season.
