= Michael Bowler =

English footballer (born 1987)

Personal information
- Full name: Michael James Bowler
- Date of birth: 8 September 1987 (age 39)
- Place of birth: Glossop, England
- Position: Right back

Youth career
- Stockport County

Senior career*
Years	Team	Apps	(Gls)
2006–2008	Stockport County	13	(0)
2008	Northwich Victoria	5	(0)
2008–2009	Kidderminster Harriers	3	(0)
2009–2014	New Mills	141	(7)
2014–2015	Glossop North End	31	(0)
- * Club domestic league appearances and goals as of 2 January 2016

Michael James Bowler (born 8 September 1987) is an English former professional footballer. Now a right-back, he started his career as a central midfielder.

== Career ==
Born in Glossop in Derbyshire, Bowler began his career at Stockport County, making his debut in a League Cup match against Derby County on 22 August 2006. His final match for Stockport was a 1–1 draw at Bradford City on 24 November 2007. He signed for Northwich Victoria on 4 January 2008, making his debut for the club the following day in a 2–1 home defeat by Aldershot Town. On 1 July 2008 he was signed by Kidderminster Harriers on a one-year contract. He was released in February 2009.

For the start of the 2009–10 season Bowler joined North West Counties League Premier Division club, New Mills. At the start of the 2014–15 season he signed for his home town club, Glossop North End.
