= Matty Mainwaring =

British model, boxer, and footballer

Matty Mainwaring - Football Career
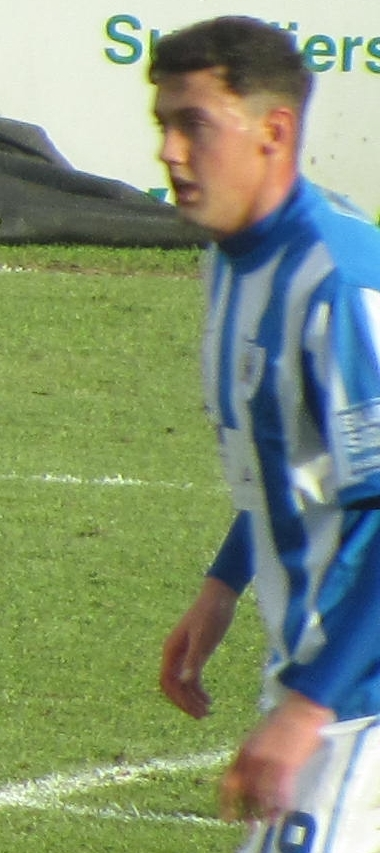
- Mainwaring playing for Stockport County in 2012

Personal information
- Full name: Matthew Thomas Mainwaring
- Date of birth: 28 March 1990 (age 36)
- Place of birth: Salford, England
- Position: Midfielder

Youth career
- 2004–2006: Manchester United
- 2006–2008: Preston North End

Senior career*
Years	Team	Apps	(Gls)
2008–2011	Stockport County	32	(1)
2012	Hull City	0	(0)
2012	→ Stockport County (loan)	15	(0)
2012–2013	Stockport County	32	(1)
2013–2014	Hyde	11	(0)
2013	→ Macclesfield Town (loan)	0	(0)
2014	Chester	2	(0)
2014	Stalybridge Celtic	9	(0)
Total		101	(2)

International career
2009	Republic of Ireland U19	0	(0)
- * Club domestic league appearances and goals

Matty Mainwaring
Personal information
- Weight: Middleweight

Boxing career

Boxing record
- Total fights: 5
- Wins: 5
- Win by KO: 0
- Losses: 0
- Draws: 0
- No contests: 0

Matthew Thomas Mainwaring (born 28 March 1990) is a British model. He is a former professional boxer and former professional footballer.

== Football career ==
=== Club career ===
==== Stockport County ====
Born in Salford, Mainwaring, came through Preston North End's Centre of Excellence youth system before signing a 12-month contract with Stockport in June 2008. This was with the intention of being part of the development squad while trying to establish himself in Stockport's first team by the end of the season.

He made his debut for the club on 30 August 2008, coming on as a substitute in a 0–3 defeat against Scunthorpe United. Hard work in the development squad was rewarded with a string of full first-team games in late January 2009, and Mainwaring scored his first professional goal in a 4–1 victory over Hereford United on 31 January 2009. Despite playing on the left wing throughout his youth career, he has preferred playing in central midfield for Stockport. He was rewarded with the club's young player of the year award and with a contract extension in May 2009.

Mainwaring was injured in a friendly pre-season match against Grimsby Town on 25 July 2009, spelled a lengthy period out of the matchday squad, being out of action for 9 months with a broken leg, in January 2010 he told the Stockport Express "I've been out for five months and I'm desperate to get back. I'm not back in training yet but I'm doing a lot of running and strength work and I've been doing a lot of exercises to rebuild my calf muscle. In September 2011 he was released by the club by mutual consent having not featured in the team for the 2011–12 season.

==== Hull City and Stockport return ====
He went on trial with Hull City in November 2011 and subsequently signed a contract with the club in January 2012. But he returned to former club Stockport County on loan. He stayed at the club until April 2012 and was subsequently released by Hull. In September 2012 he re-joined Stockport on non-contract terms. and in October he signed on contract terms until 1 January 2013. He finished the 2012–13 season having played 31 games, scoring just the one goal, in a 3–1 win over Barrow.

==== Hyde ====
On 3 August 2013, he signed for Conference Premier side Hyde following Stockport's relegation to the Conference North. He made his debut for Hyde on 24 August 2013, in a 2–2 drawe away at Wrexham. On 28 November, he went on a month's loan to Conference Premier rivals Macclesfield Town.

==== Chester ====
In February 2014 he joined Chester on non-contract terms and was added to the squad for the rest of the season.

==== Stalybridge Celtic ====
In July he joined Stalybridge Celtic and retired on 28 October to become a professional boxer.

=== International career ===
Mainwaring has been a member of the Republic of Ireland U19 squad, after the Football Association of Ireland found out that he had Irish lineage on his father's side of the family.

== Boxing career ==
=== Professional boxing record ===
5 wins (0 knockouts, 5 decisions), 0 losses
Res.	Record	Opponent	Type	Round, time	Date	Location	Notes
Win	1–0	(Italy) Victor Edagha	PTS	4	12 December 2015	(United Kingdom) Winter Gardens, Blackpool, Lancashire	Professional boxing debut.
Win	2–0	(United Kingdom) Tommy Carter	PTS	4	24 June 2016	(United Kingdom) Middleton Arena, Middleton, Greater Manchester	

== Personal life ==
In 2004, Mainwaring won the chance to appear on the Children's TV show, 'Really Bend it Like Beckham' where he appeared as a young hotshot. He got the chance to meet at-the-time Manchester United player David Beckham.

Speaking after the programme in 2004, David Beckham said: "What I think impressed me about Matthew was when he was up against another of the hotshots Mollie, he was giving her a little bit of a chance, whereas some young kids wouldn't care. They just want to do their best and go straight through whether it's a girl or a boy. But that's what impressed me, he was a caring person. He was congratulating Mollie and saying well done to her. That's what I realised and recognised throughout the day ... and he's a great talent of course."
