= Lloyd Rigby =

English footballer

Personal information
- Date of birth: 27 February 1989 (age 37)
- Place of birth: Preston, England
- Position: Goalkeeper

Youth career
- ?–2007: Rochdale

Senior career*
Years	Team	Apps	(Gls)
2007–2008	Rochdale	0	(0)
2008	→ Vauxhall Motors (loan)		(0)
2008–2009	Vauxhall Motors		(0)
2009–2010	Stockport County	2	(0)
2009–2010	→ Radcliffe Borough (loan)		(0)
2010	Royal Racing Montegnée		(0)
2010–2011	Chorley		(0)
2011–2012	Leigh Genesis		(0)
2012	Salford City		(0)
2016	Broughton Amateurs	1	(0)
2017	Benidorm FC	1	(0)
2017	Bamber Bridge	5	(0)
- * Club domestic league appearances and goals as of 03:37, 24 January 2016 (UTC)

Lloyd Joseph Rigby (born 27 February 1989) is an English professional footballer who plays as a goalkeeper.

== Club career ==
Rigby came through Rochdale's youth system, signing a one-year contract in 2007. He was loaned out to Conference North club Vauxhall Motors in January 2008. He made his debut in their 2–0 defeat away at Redditch United. After a successful loan period with Vauxhall, Rigby signed a permanent deal with the club at the end of the 2007–08 season, before being taken on trial by League One club Stockport County and eventually signing a permanent contract.

He made his debut on 1 September for Stockport in their 4–1 away victory over Crewe Alexandra in the Football League Trophy. Rigby spent most of the season on loan at Radcliffe Borough before returning to Stockport, to make a couple of appearances at the end of the 2009–10 season.

He returned to pre-season training at Stockport County at the start of the 2010–11 season, after the club came out of administration. and appeared in a couple of their friendlies, but was released before the season started. He then spent some time playing in Belgium. He went on to sign for Chorley.

He played for Leigh Genesis before signing for Salford City in January 2012. He went on to play for Bamber Bridge FC.
