= David Poole (footballer) =

English footballer (born 1984)

- Poole playing for Hyde in 2012

Personal information
- Full name: David Andrew Poole
- Date of birth: 25 November 1984 (age 41)
- Place of birth: Manchester, England
- Height: 5 ft 6 in (1.68 m)
- Position: Winger

Youth career
- 2001–2003: Manchester United

Senior career*
Years	Team	Apps	(Gls)
2003–2005	Manchester United	0	(0)
2005–2007	Yeovil Town	21	(2)
2006	→ Stockport County (loan)	13	(2)
2007–2008	Stockport County	40	(4)
2008–2009	Darlington	26	(1)
2009–2011	Stockport County	65	(2)
2011	Droylsden	2	(0)
2011–2014	Hyde	33	(4)
Total		200	(15)
- * Club domestic league appearances and goals

David Andrew Poole (born 25 November 1984) is an English former footballer who played as a winger.

He played in the youth teams at Manchester United, before moving to Yeovil Town in 2005. He moved on loan to Stockport County in 2006, before signing for them permanently in 2007. He signed for Darlington in 2008 but returned to Stockport in 2009. He left in 2011 and joined Droylsden before joining Hyde.

== Club career ==
=== Yeovil Town ===
Born in Manchester, England, Poole is a product of the Manchester United youth academy. He left United for a trial with Yeovil Town in 2005 after the club decided to abandon one of their reserve sides. Right-sided midfielder Poole impressed manager Gary Johnson during his month at Huish Park and he was signed by Yeovil on a free transfer in June 2005. He made his debut for the club on 6 August 2005 in a 2–0 defeat to Oldham Athletic. On 17 December 2005, he scored his first goal for the club, getting his name on the score-sheet in a 2–1 win over Barnsley. He scored again later that month, in a 1–1 draw with Bristol City. He finished the 2005–06 season with just the two goals to his name in 25 appearances.

After playing just four games for Yeovil in the 2006–07 season, he was sent out on loan to Football League Two side Stockport County for two-months in August 2006. After scoring one goal against Barnet in five first-team appearances for Stockport, his loan was extended for an additional month.

=== Stockport County ===
After returning to Yeovil for a short while, both clubs & the player agreed a deal that saw Poole return to Edgeley Park for a £10,000 fee. He scored his first goal since signing on a permanent deal in an FA Cup third round tie at Premier League side Watford in January 2007. Poole finished the 2006–07 season with three goals for Stockport since signing permanently, the latter two coming as part of a 5–0 win over Darlington on the final day of the season. He grabbed his first goal of the 2007–08 season in November, scoring in a 1–1 draw at Bradford City. He scored his second of the campaign in March 2008, scoring the only goal in a 1–0 win over Lincoln City. He finished the season with just the two goals in 25 first team appearances.

=== Darlington ===
On 1 July 2008, he joined Darlington on a free transfer after being released by Stockport. He made his debut on 9 August 2008, in a 1–1 draw with Exeter City at the Darlington Arena. It took Poole until March 2009 to score his first goal for the club, when he scored in a 2–1 defeat to Macclesfield Town. He finished the 2008–09 season having played a total of 30 games in all competitions, scoring just the one goal.

=== Return to Stockport ===
In July 2009, he returned to Stockport County after being released by Darlington. He made his second debut for the club on 8 August 2009 in a 0–0 draw with Oldham Athletic. He scored his first goal of the season in November, in a 5–0 FA Cup win over Tooting & Mitcham United. He received a red card in December in a 4–2 defeat to Leeds United. He received his second red card of the season in March 2010 in a 1–0 defeat to Bristol Rovers. He finished the 2009–10 season with just the one goal. He scored his first goal of the 2010–11 season in December 2010, scoring in a 3–3 draw with Crewe Alexandra. He scored just once more that season, scoring in a 4–3 defeat to Lincoln City in January 2011. He finished the season with just the two goals in 32 appearances, and in May 2011 he was informed that he would not be offered a contract by the club for the 2011–12 season.

=== Hyde ===
On 18 August 2011, he signed for Conference North side Droylsden, but in November 2011 he joined their local and league rivals Hyde. He made his debut for the club coming on as a substitute for Shelton Payne in a 1–0 win over Blyth Spartans. He scored his first goal for the club in a 2–2 draw at Worcester City in December 2011. After helping Hyde to win the Conference North title, he signed a new contract with the club which would keep him there until the end of the 2012–13 season. This was followed by another one-year deal in the summer of 2013.

== Personal life ==
Poole married Carolynne Good on 3 June 2008. They divorced in 2011.

== Honours ==
=== Club ===
Stockport County

- League Two play-offs (1): 2008

Hyde

- Conference North (1): 2011–12
