= Matty McNeil =

English footballer

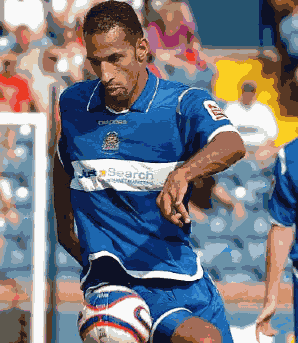
- McNeil in 2013

Personal information
- Full name: Matthew McNeil
- Date of birth: 14 July 1976 (age 50)
- Place of birth: Manchester, England
- Height: 6 ft 5 in (1.96 m)
- Position: Forward

Senior career*
Years	Team	Apps	(Gls)
1996–1999	Altrincham	17	(6)
1998–1999	→ Woodley Sports (loan)	28	(21)
1999–2002	Stalybridge Celtic	63	(27)
2002–2003	Runcorn	39	(12)
2003–2006	Hyde United	108	(36)
2006	→ Macclesfield Town (loan)	12	(1)
2006–2007	Macclesfield Town	35	(4)
2007–2010	Stockport County	42	(5)
2010–2011	Southport	35	(5)
2011–2012	Chester	32	(9)
Total		405	(126)
- * Club domestic league appearances and goals

Matthew McNeil (born 14 July 1976) is an English former professional footballer who played as a forward.

== Career ==
=== Non League ===
Born in Manchester, McNeil played local football in the Middleton Sunday leagues and Rochdale Saturday leagues until the age of 20. He then played a few games for Curzon Ashton Reserves before being spotted by the Altrincham Reserve team manager, Bernard Taylor. After turning out good performances in the reserves, he then progressed on into the first team scoring a goal on his debut. He then came on as a substitute in the league cup final against Gainsborough, helping the team to come from behind to win the cup after extra time.

In pre-season, McNeil was then scouted by Burnley and Crewe after a fine midfield display against a strong Manchester City side. He was offered a week trial at Burnley in which he completed, and then he was asked to stay longer because Burnley had liked what they had seen. He stayed for a total of three weeks, playing in the reserve league before an injury brought the trial to an end. McNeil was told "go back to Altrincham and get fit and we will come and have another look". He then got fit, played a few first team games but couldn't hold a regular place down and was loaned out to Woodley Sports.

After impressing in a cup tie for Woodley Sports against Stalybridge Celtic he was then quickly snapped up by them in 1999, where he went on to win an Historic Treble and gain promotion to the conference National. McNeil also attracted the attentions of a lot of league clubs throughout the season, with Bury being the most notable. At the end of the season the Management team and several players had left the club for Southport, leaving the club to rebuild for the new season. McNeil and his new teammates found it very difficult in the Conference and he opted to move to Runcorn in January for an undisclosed fee. He helped the club have a strong finish to their season and the following year the club reached the first round proper of the FA Cup, in which he scored in every round.

He was then sold to Hyde United, where he won two leagues, two cups plus he was Hyde's supporters player of the year for two years in succession. His form and goals gained the attention of then, Macclesfield Town boss Brian Horton.

=== The Football League ===
McNeil made a scoring and man of the match performance on his professional debut in the 2005–06 Northern Final, second leg against Carlisle United and took the tie to extra time, but Macclesfield lost on away goals. Following a successful two-month loan spell, he signed a permanent contract with League Two side Macclesfield Town in June 2006. He made 35 league appearances in the 2006–07 season, scoring five goals. The highlight of the season was playing at Chelsea in the third round of the FA Cup, and getting an assist for the goal in the 6–1 defeat. He also had a good end to the season, helping keep the club in the football league. He was offered a new contract at Macclesfield, but joined Stockport County in July 2007, where manager Jim Gannon said of him, "He has all the qualities we want. He's very strong, hard working and well equipped for his role."

He made 22 appearances for Stockport, scoring six goals and won the player of the month for both September and November, before injury interrupted his 2007–08 season. He returned to feature briefly in Stockport's final game of the season, coming on as a substitute for the final few minutes of their Wembley play-off victory.

He was offered a new twelve-month contract by Stockport, but the first half of his 2008–09 season also turned out to be plagued by injury. After being sent off shortly into the second match of the season, McNeil suffered a knee injury in training, and missed the remainder of August, all of September, and the first half of October. He returned to face Colchester United on 18 October, scoring in the first half, but being hospitalised with a head injury by a clumsy challenge in the second half. After a further month out through injury, McNeil returned to the first team for a spell of games in November, before a recurrence of a back problem forced him to limp out of the pre-match warmup for an FA Cup tie against Gillingham on 9 December, and spend the next six weeks on the sidelines. McNeil was out of contract at the end of the season, and with the club going into administration, plus the management being made redundant, he wasn't offered a new contract.

He then had a contract offer from Accrington Stanley, but when the deal was agreed, Accrington then reduced the contract offer, and he felt that the deal didn't suit him. He then went on to train with Rochdale and Bury, but for one reason or another a deal was not offered. At the start of December, McNeil then made a surprise return to Stockport County in League One, where he signed a short-term contract until January, and then he was promised a deal until the end of the season. With the club still in administration, they made some loan signings in January, and some signings on a 6-month contract, but towards the end of January, McNeil was only offered another short-term deal and not the deal until the end of the season as promised, so he decided to leave the club.

=== Return to non-League ===
McNeil signed for Southport on 12 May 2010, after he left Stockport County earlier on in the year. He made a good start to the season, hitting two goals against Kidderminster in a thrilling 4–3 away win, but soon after that he had a groin injury which kept him out for a few weeks. When he came back he helped the club to a money spinning home tie, live on ITV with league one side Sheffield Wednesday in the first round of the FA Cup. McNeil and his teammates battled on in the league but they couldn't do enough to keep the club from finishing fourth bottom of the Conference. However the club stayed up because Rushden was kicked out of the league due to breaking the rules.

He signed for Chester in June 2011, after he left Southport the previous month. McNeil suffered a knee injury in his first pre-season friendly against Tranmere, and missed the rest of pre-season. He then managed to recover in time to make the first game of the season, where he scored on his debut. His season would be cut short due to a career threatening knee injury, which meant he would miss the last 10 games of the season, However, he still went on to win Supporters player of the year and the Managers player of the year. The team also went on to secure the league title and win their second successive promotion in two years.

== Personal life ==
His son, Dwight, currently plays for Premier League club Crystal Palace F.C.

== Honours ==
Altrincham

- Challenge Cup: 1997–98

Stalybridge Celtic

- Northern Premier League: 2000–01
- Presidents cup: 2000–01
- Cheshire Senior Cup: 2000–01
- Peter Swailes Challenge Shield: 2001–02

Hyde United

- Northern Premier League First Division: 2003–04
- Chairman's Cup: 2003–04
- Northern Premier League: 2004–05
- Manchester Premier Cup: 2004–05
- Peter Swailes Challenge Shield: 2005–06

Stockport County

- Football League Two play-offs: 2008

Chester

- Northern Premier League: 2011–12

Individual

- NPL Team of the Year: 2000–01, 2004–05, 2011–12
- NPL Player of the Season: 2004–05
