= Gianluca Havern =

English footballer (born 1988)

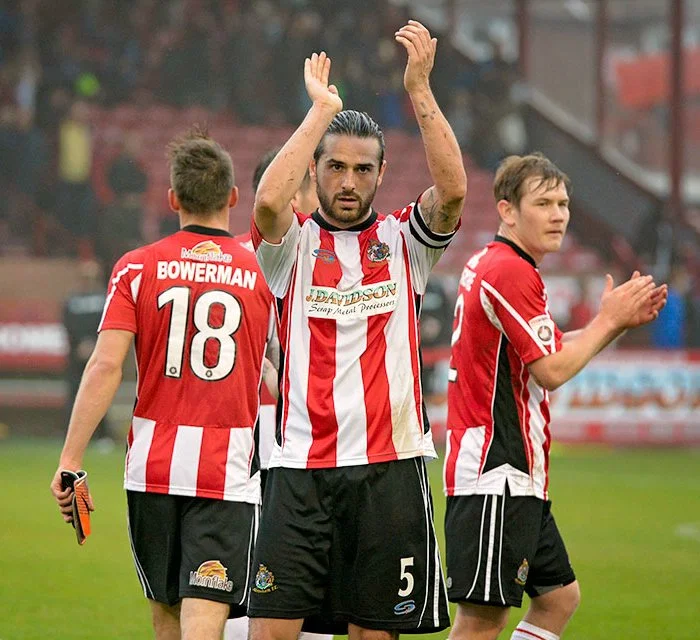
- Havern playing for Altrincham FC

Personal information
- Full name: Gianluca Havern
- Date of birth: 24 September 1988 (age 38)
- Place of birth: Manchester, England
- Height: 6 ft 3 in (1.91 m)
- Position: Defender

Youth career
- 2005–2006: Stockport County

Senior career*
Years	Team	Apps	(Gls)
2006–2009	Stockport County	1	(1)
2007	→ Radcliffe Borough (loan)	?	(?)
2007	→ Ashton United (loan)	?	(?)
2009	Mansfield Town	4	(0)
2009–2010	Stockport County	7	(0)
2010	Mossley	?	(?)
2010–2011	Ashton United	?	(?)
2011–2012	Hyde	32	(3)
2012–2016	Altrincham	133	(6)
2016–2017	AFC Telford United	40	(1)
2017–2019	Bradford (Park Avenue)	75	(2)
2019–2020	Ashton United	17	(2)
2020–2023	Bradford (Park Avenue)	33	(3)
2023–2024	Avro	?	(?)
- * Club domestic league appearances and goals as of 21:21, 2 February 2022 (UTC)

Gianluca Havern (born 24 September 1988) is an English retired footballer who played as a defender.

In his playing career, Havern had played for Stockport County, Radcliffe Borough, Ashton United, Mansfield Town and Hyde.

== Club career ==
Born in Manchester, Greater Manchester, Havern came through the club youth system at Stockport County where he was captain of the under-18 side. He had spells on loan at Northern Premier League Premier Division clubs Radcliffe Borough and at Ashton United in 2007. He made his Stockport County debut against Brentford in May 2008 and scored the winning goal. With Stockport citing financial trouble, Havern was one of several staff released in January 2009. He left County having made only one appearance for the first team and was immediately taken on as trialist at Conference National outfit Mansfield Town, where he was soon offered a six-month contract. After this spell, Havern returned to Stockport County on non-contract terms before signing another contract deal. On 31 August 2010 it was announced by Stockport that an agreement had been made regarding early settlements of player's contracts and as a result he had left the club.

On 6 September 2010 it was announced he had been signed by Mossley, but after just a month and only six appearances he moved to Tameside rivals Ashton United. In June 2011, he moved to Conference North side Hyde along with team-mate Ryan Crowther.

In July 2012 he joined Altrincham.

In July 2016 he moved to AFC Telford United, where he became club captain.

He then played for Bradford Park Avenue.

In June 2019 he rejoined Ashton United. The move to Ashton didn't work out, despite dropping down a division and he re-signed for Bradford Park Avenue for the 2020–21 season in the National League North.

Havern retired in August 2024.

== Personal life ==
He is partly of Italian descent.
