= Anthony Pilkington =

Irish footballer

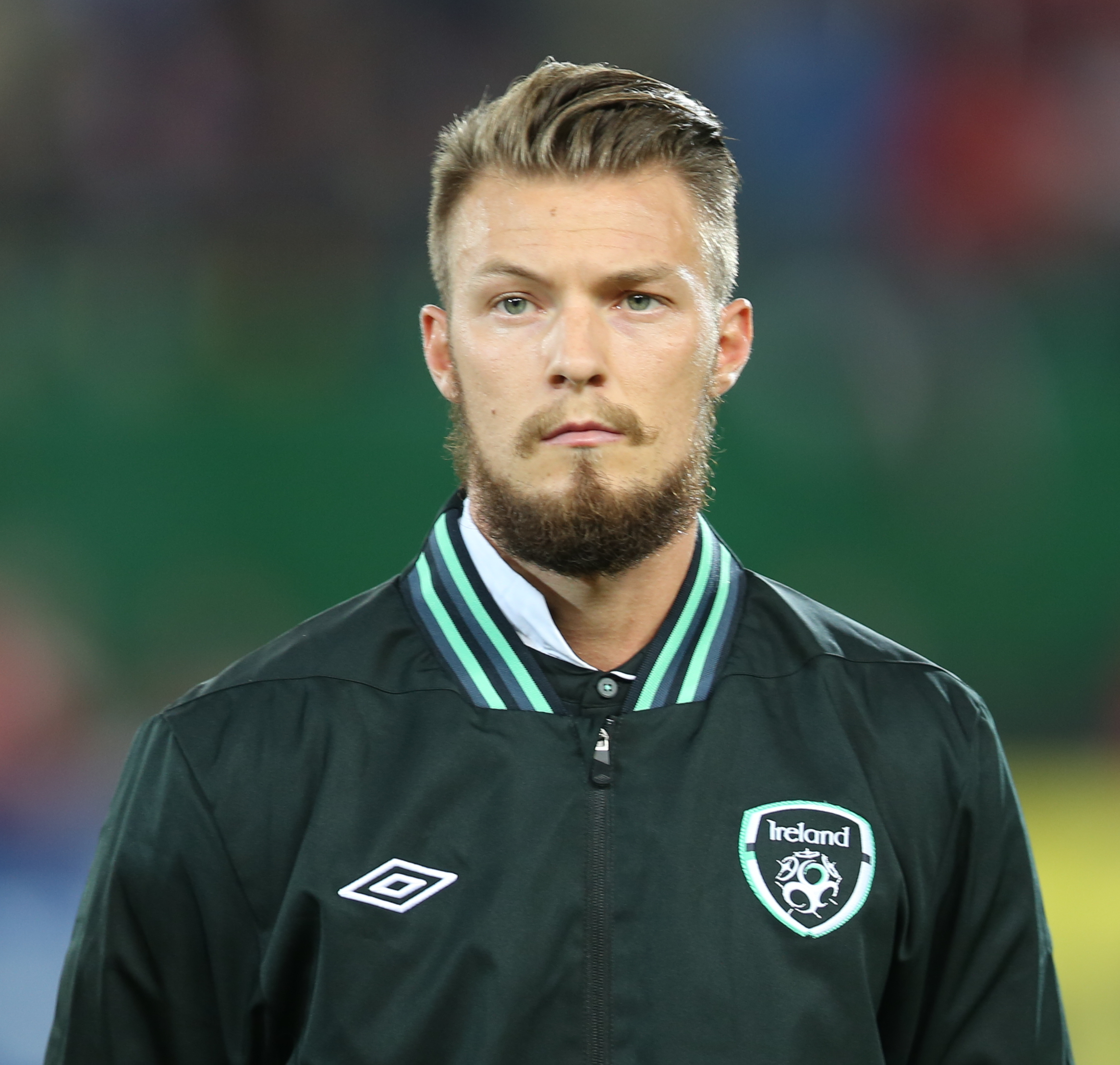
- Pilkington with Republic of Ireland in 2013

Personal information
- Full name: Anthony Neil James Pilkington
- Date of birth: 6 June 1988 (age 38)
- Place of birth: Blackburn, England
- Height: 1.81 m (5 ft 11 in)
- Position: Winger

Youth career
- 2003–2004: Preston North End
- 2004–2005: Manchester United
- 2005: Blackburn Rovers

Senior career*
Years	Team	Apps	(Gls)
2005	Blackburn Rovers	0	(0)
2005–2006	Atherton Collieries	35	(19)
2006–2009	Stockport County	80	(17)
2009–2011	Huddersfield Town	92	(19)
2011–2014	Norwich City	75	(14)
2014–2019	Cardiff City	103	(20)
2019–2020	Wigan Athletic	24	(2)
2020–2021	East Bengal	17	(3)
2021–2022	Fleetwood Town	25	(4)
Total		451	(98)

International career^{‡}
2008	Republic of Ireland U21	1	(0)
2013–2016	Republic of Ireland	9	(1)
- * Club domestic league appearances and goals as of 20:11, 23 March 2022 (UTC) ‡ National team caps and goals as of 29 March 2016

Anthony Neil James Pilkington (born 6 June 1988) is an Irish former professional footballer who played as a winger.

After playing non-league football briefly, he began his professional career with spells at Stockport County and Huddersfield Town. In July 2011, he joined Premier League side Norwich City in a deal worth up to £3 million and went on to play 75 matches in the top tier for the Canaries before moving to Cardiff City three years later. He also represented Republic of Ireland at international level winning nine caps.

== Club career ==
=== Stockport County ===
Born in Blackburn, Lancashire, Pilkington spent time with the youth systems of Preston North End, Manchester United and hometown club Blackburn Rovers. He joined Stockport County on 15 December 2006, from Atherton Collieries, where he made his name scoring a hat-trick against F.C. United of Manchester and signed initially on a short-term contract at Edgeley Park, and made an instant impact on the team, scoring three goals in his first four games for the club, including two against Shrewsbury Town at Gay Meadow. Pilkington then played a big part in County's record breaking run of results during January and February 2007.

He continued to help Stockport's push for the playoffs by scoring a further two goals in a season which saw County miss out on the play-offs only on goal-difference.

The following season he scored the second goal for Stockport and assisted the third in their 3–2 win over Rochdale at Wembley Stadium. He also picked up the official man-of-the-match award as Stockport were promoted to League One.

In January 2008, his brother Danny also signed for Stockport.

=== Huddersfield Town ===
On 23 January 2009, he was signed by fellow League One side Huddersfield Town on a three-and-a-half-year contract. He made his debut in the 1–0 defeat by Yeovil Town at Huish Park on 27 January 2009. On 3 March, he scored his first league goal for Huddersfield against Colchester United at the Galpharm Stadium. The match ended 2–2. His first away goal for the Terriers came in the 2–1 win against Bristol Rovers at the Memorial Stadium on 31 March 2009.

Pilkington started the 2009–10 season well, scoring on the opening day of the season against Southend United when Huddersfield were two goals down to make it 2–1, they eventually drew the game 2–2. He then scored two more in the second round of the Football League Trophy in a 3–3 draw with Chesterfield, eventually losing on penalties. His second league goal came in a 2–1 away loss at Charlton Athletic with a 30-yard free kick just before half time.

Pilkington was a regular in the Huddersfield team throughout the 2009–10 season, only missing one league game all season. He made 45 league appearances with a further five coming in cup competitions, scoring seven league goals as Huddersfield made a play-off semi-final, with a further two goals coming in the Football League Trophy.

In the 2–1 home win over Rochdale, on 8 March 2011, Pilkington suffered a dislocated left ankle as well as a break to the fibula bone above the ankle. On 30 June, the club announced that Pilkington had declared his intention to leave following their failure to win promotion from League One.

=== Norwich City ===
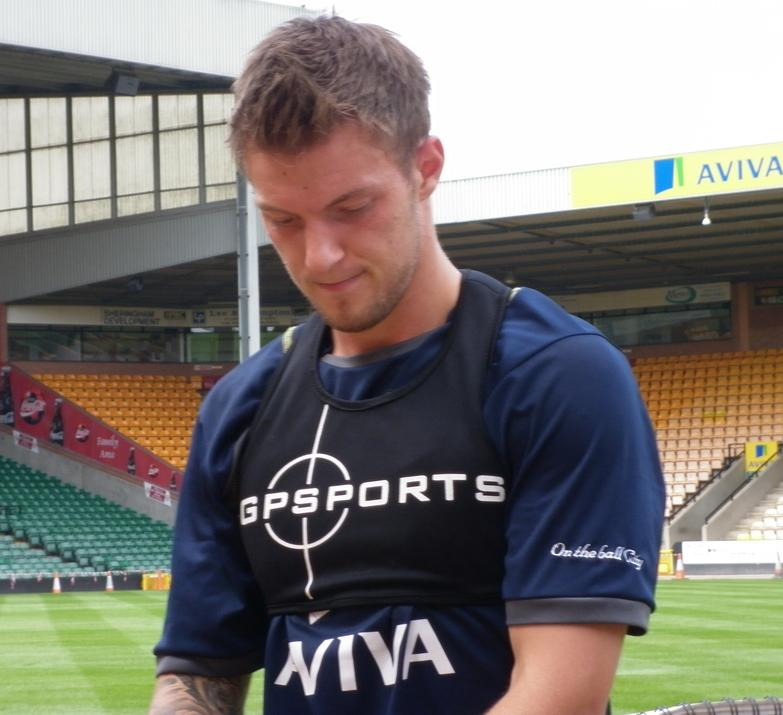
Pilkington with Norwich in 2011.

Pilkington joined Norwich City on 6 July 2011 and signed a three-year deal with the option of a further 12 months. The fee was reported to be around £2 million but rising to £3 million with add-ons.

He made his first appearance since his injury in the 1–1 friendly draw versus Real Zaragoza on 3 August 2011, coming off the bench to replace Bradley Johnson. Pilkington made his competitive Norwich debut in the opening day Premier League 1–1 draw at Wigan Athletic, replacing Steve Morison. Pilkington's first Norwich goal came on 17 September 2011, in a 2–1 win against Bolton Wanderers at the Reebok Stadium. Pilkington scored a double in the 3–1 win over Swansea City at Carrow Road on 15 October 2011. He scored his eighth goal of his first Premier League campaign in a 2–1 away win over Tottenham Hotspur on 9 April 2012.

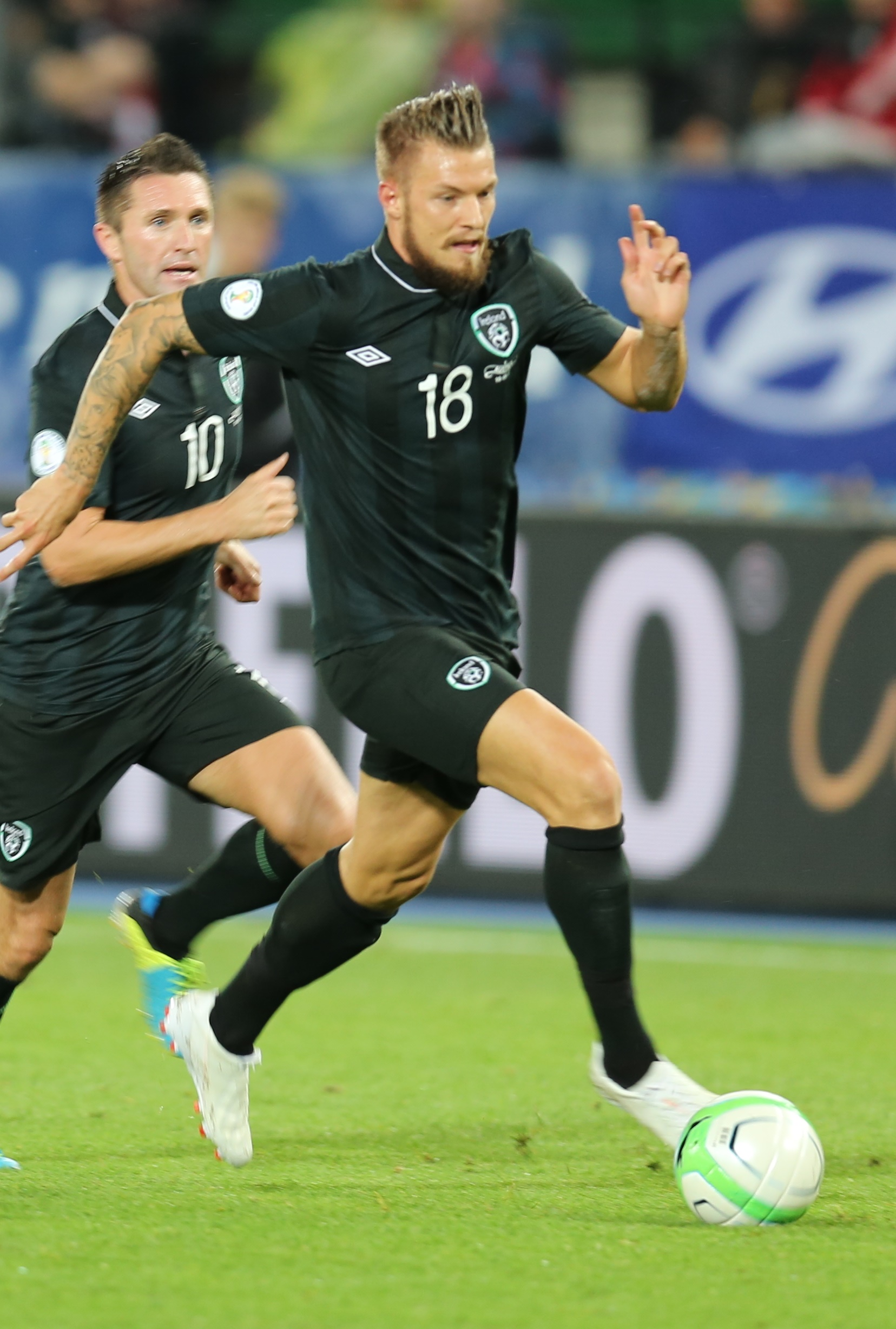
Pilkington in action for the Republic of Ireland.

On 17 November 2012, Pilkington scored the winning goal against his former club Manchester United in a 1–0 win for Norwich.

=== Cardiff City ===
On 14 August 2014, it was reported that Norwich had agreed a £1m fee with Cardiff City for Pilkington. The move was completed on 15 August with Pilkington signing a three-year deal. His first goal for Cardiff City came during their 2–1 win against Sheffield Wednesday on 27 September 2014. He became a regular in the starting eleven until a hamstring injury put him out for several months on 29 November. He made his return in April in a 3–1 loss at Ipswich Town.

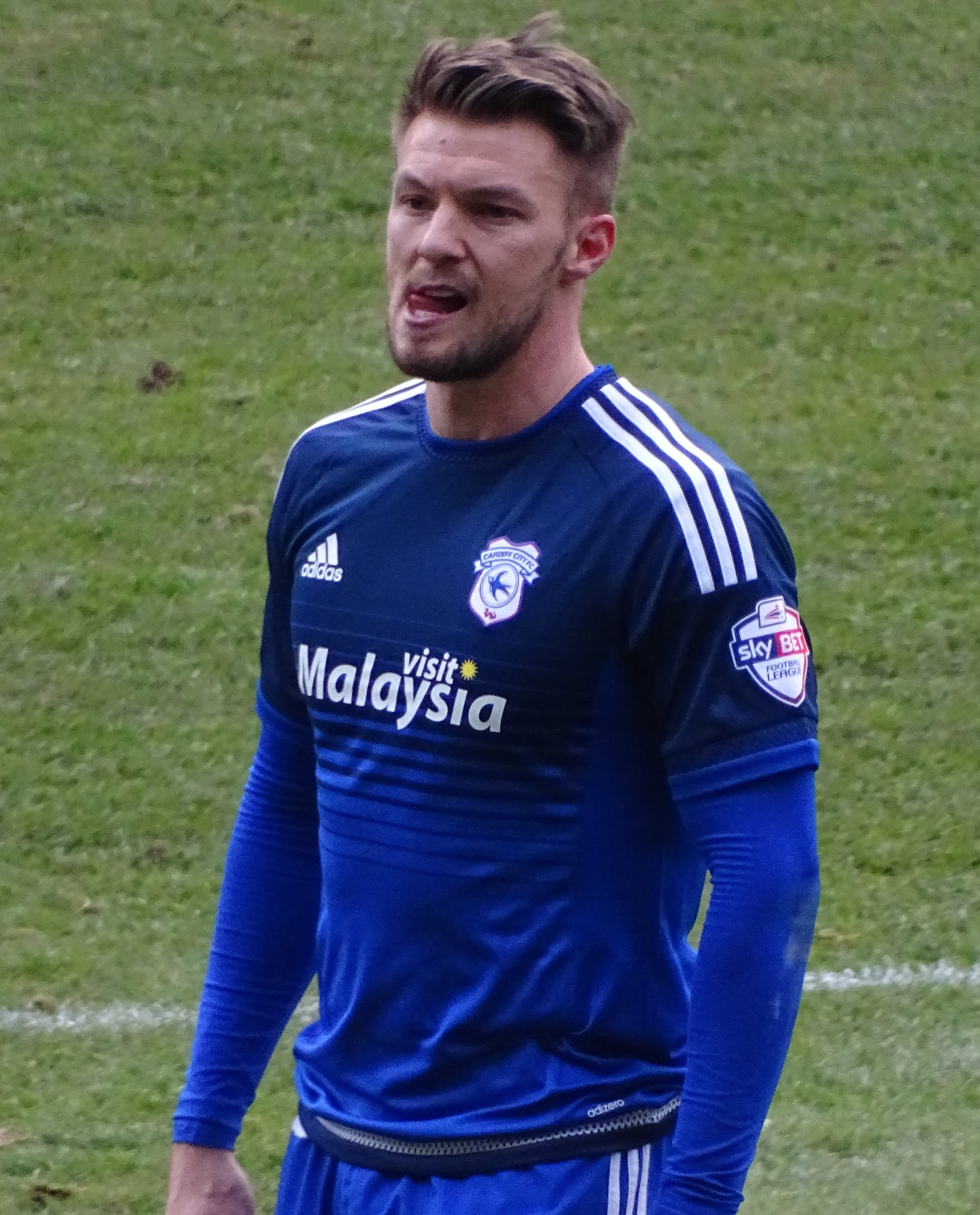
Pilkington playing for Cardiff City in 2016.

Pilkington returned to the starting line up, the following season, eventually scoring his first goal against Huddersfield Town in September. Following with consecutive goals against Bolton Wanderers and Sheffield Wednesday. With the club short on forwards following departures in the January transfer window, Pilkington was moved into an unfamiliar more advanced role playing as a striker and finished the season with nine goals in total, including braces against Rotherham United and Preston North End, finishing the season as the club's top scorer.

Pilkington opened his accounts for the new season, against Fulham in a 2–2 draw before scoring a brace against former club, Norwich City. On 27 September, he was rewarded with a two-year contract extension, keeping him at Cardiff until 2019. Despite finishing as one of the club's top goalscorer during the season, with 8 goals, he only managed 7 appearances following Neil Warnock's arrival in October, leading to the manager claiming he didn't know whether Pilkington had a future at the club.

Despite the uncertainty of his future, Pilkington stayed at the club during the summer of 2017, making appearances in the EFL Cup and scoring against Burton Albion. He made his first league appearance on 16 December, starting in a 1–0 win over Hull City, due to the club being left without a recognised striker. Pilkington managed to find the net in a 4–0 win over Sunderland and in a FA Cup at Mansfield Town. His return to the first team led to Warnock stating that there could still be a future for the striker, despite offers during the January transfer window.

=== Wigan Athletic ===
On 10 January 2019, Pilkington was signed by Wigan Athletic on a free transfer after leaving Cardiff via mutual consent, signing an 18-month deal. He started their next game, which was a 3–0 win against Aston Villa. He played ten games. for Wigan, in 2018–19. He did not score in that season. The next season, he became a rotation player for Wigan. He scored his first goal in a 1–0 win against Birmingham City. For the 2019–20 season, he played 16 times and scored on three occasions, including his former club, Huddersfield.

=== East Bengal ===
On 17 October 2020, Pilkington moved to Indian Super League and signed with SC East Bengal, managed by Robbie Fowler. He scored first league goal against Odisha FC in 3–1 win on 3 January 2021. He appeared in seventeen matches with the Red and Gold brigade, scoring three times as they finished on ninth position.

=== Fleetwood Town ===
Pilkington left East Bengal at the end of the 2020–21 season because he had agreed terms with League One side, Fleetwood Town. He started the season in a 1–0 defeat to Portsmouth. He played in ten league games for The Cod Army as well as two other games. He scored his first goal for Fleetwood in a 1–0 win against Rotherham in January 2022. Pilkington was released by the club at the end of the 2021–22 season.

=== Retirement ===
On 19 October 2022, Pilkington announced his retirement from football having been without a club since his release from Fleetwood five months prior.

== International career ==
Pilkington received a call-up to the Republic of Ireland under-21 squad in October 2008; not knowing he was eligible to play for Republic of Ireland national sides until a scout enquired of his availability. He qualifies through his paternal grandmother from Dublin. He played in the 3–0 away victory over Lithuania, where he impressed and even hit the woodwork. Giovanni Trapattoni and Marco Tardelli were reported to have been keeping an eye on him ahead of Ireland's participation in UEFA Euro 2012. In January 2013, Pilkington was called up for the Republic of Ireland Senior Team to play Poland in a friendly in February. The Norwich winger played almost 20 minutes during Ireland's 2–1 loss to Sweden in Dublin on 6 September 2013 as a replacement for James McClean in a 2014 FIFA World Cup qualification (UEFA) game.

On 18 November 2014, Pilkington scored his first goal for Ireland against the U.S.A with a sublime chip over the keeper.

== Personal life ==
Pilkington has a younger brother, Danny, who plays for Stalybridge Celtic.

== Career statistics ==
=== Club ===
As of end of 2021–22 season

Appearances and goals by club, season and competition
Club	Season	League			F.A. Cup		League Cup		Other		Total	
Club	Season	Division	Apps	Goals	Apps	Goals	Apps	Goals	Apps	Goals	Apps	Goals
Atherton Collieries	2005–06	NWCFL Division One	16	7	0	0	0	0	0	0	16	9
Atherton Collieries	2006–07	NWCFL Division One	19	12	0	0	0	0	0	0	19	12
Atherton Collieries	Total		35	19	0	0	0	0	0	0	35	19
Stockport County	2006–07	League Two	24	5	0	0	0	0	0	0	24	5
Stockport County	2007–08	League Two	32	7	1	0	2	0	2	1	37	8
Stockport County	2008–09	League One	24	5	4	1	1	0	1	0	46	8
Stockport County	Total		80	17	5	1	3	0	3	1	107	21
Huddersfield Town	2008–09	League One	16	2	0	0	0	0	0	0	16	2
Huddersfield Town	2009–10	League One	43	7	2	0	2	0	4	2	51	9
Huddersfield Town	2010–11	League One	31	10	4	1	1	0	4	3	40	14
Huddersfield Town	Total		90	19	6	1	3	0	8	5	108	25
Norwich City	2011–12	Premier League	30	8	2	0	0	0	0	0	32	8
Norwich City	2012–13	Premier League	30	5	1	0	2	0	0	0	33	5
Norwich City	2013–14	Premier League	15	1	0	0	2	1	0	0	17	2
Norwich City	Total		75	14	3	0	4	1	0	0	82	15
Cardiff City	2014–15	Championship	20	1	0	0	1	0	0	0	21	1
Cardiff City	2015–16	Championship	41	9	0	0	0	0	0	0	41	9
Cardiff City	2016–17	Championship	34	7	1	1	1	0	0	0	36	8
Cardiff City	2017–18	Championship	8	3	3	1	2	1	0	0	13	5
Cardiff City	Total		103	20	4	2	4	1	0	0	111	23
Wigan Athletic	2018–19	Championship	10	0	0	0	0	0	0	0	10	0
Wigan Athletic	2019–20	Championship	16	3	0	0	0	0	0	0	16	3
Wigan Athletic	Total		26	3	0	0	0	0	0	0	26	3
East Bengal	2020–21	Indian Super League	17	3	–		–		–		17	3
Fleetwood Town	2021–22	League One	26	4	0	0	1	0	1	0	28	4
Career total			452	99	18	4	15	2	12	6	497	111

=== International ===
Scores and results list the Republic of Ireland's goal tally first, score column indicates score after each Pilkington goal.

List of international goals scored by Anthony Pilkington
No.	Date	Venue	Opponent	Score	Result	Competition
1	18 November 2014	Aviva Stadium, Dublin, Republic of Ireland	United States	1–0	4–1	Friendly

== Honours ==
Stockport County

- Football League Two play-offs: 2008

Cardiff City

- EFL Championship runner-up: 2017–18

Individual

- PFA Team of the Year: 2010–11 League One

== See also ==
- List of Republic of Ireland international footballers born outside the Republic of Ireland
