= 2010–11 Stockport County F.C. season =

Stockport County
2010–11 season
- Chairman: Alwin Thompson (until 7 January); Mary Gibbons
- Manager: Paul Simpson (until 4 January); Peter Ward (until 9 March); Ray Mathias
- Stadium: Edgeley Park
- League Two: 24th
- FA Cup: 1st round
- League Cup: 1st round
- League Trophy: 2nd round
- Top goalscorer: League: Greg Tansey (10); All: Greg Tansey (11)
- Highest home attendance: 5,470 (v Macclesfield Town)
- Lowest home attendance: 2,001 (v Peterborough United, FA Cup)
- Average home league attendance: 4,163
Home colours	Away colours	Third colours

The 2010–11 season was Stockport County's 100th season in the Football League, and 96th consecutively. However, they eventually finished 24th in Football League Two and were relegated to the Football Conference.

The season began with the club being taken over by the 2015 consortium, following the club being in administration since April 2009. Following the takeover, Gary Ablett left the position of manager and was replaced by Paul Simpson. However, in January Simpson was sacked and was replaced on a part-time basis by assistant Peter Ward. Ward was unable to stop Stockport's slide down the league, and was himself replaced by Ray Mathias who had initially joined the club as a technical adviser to Ward. Results improved under Mathias, picking up 10 points from the final 6 home matches, but it wasn't enough to save the Hatters and relegation was confirmed following a 2–0 defeat to Crewe Alexandra

Stockport lost in the first round of both the League Cup and the FA Cup, losing to Peterborough United and Preston North End respectively.

== League table ==
Pos	Team	Pld	W	D	L	GF	GA	GD	Pts	Promotion, qualification or relegation
20	Morecambe	46	13	12	21	54	73	−19	51	
21	Hereford United	46	12	17	17	50	66	−16	50 (Note: Torquay United deducted one point and Hereford United deducted three points)	
22	Barnet	46	12	12	22	58	77	−19	48	
23	Lincoln City (R)	46	13	8	25	45	81	−36	47	Relegation to Conference National
24	Stockport County (R)	46	9	14	23	48	96	−48	41	Relegation to Conference National

Updated to match(es) played on 28 May 2011. Source: The Football League
Rules for classification: 1) points; 2) goal difference; 3) number of goals scored.
(R) Relegated

== Results ==
=== Pre-season friendlies ===
Stockport County opted not to name players on trial who played in friendlies, following other clubs chasing Belgian striker Esteban Casagolda after he scored twice in a behind-closed-doors friendly. Hence a number of goals were listed as scored by 'trialist'.

As Edgeley Park is owned by Sale Sharks, problems with the pitch have arisen from having both football and Rugby Union on the same surface. Consequently, Stockport played their 'home' friendly against Inverness Caledonian Thistle at Wincham Park, home of Witton Albion.

20 July 2010	Northwich Victoria	0–5	Stockport County	Victoria Stadium, Northwich
19:30		Report	Swailes 8'; Poole 11'; Tansey 30' (pen.) trialist 75'; Partridge 77'

24 July 2010	Skelmersdale United	0–3	Stockport County	Stormy Corner, Skelmersdale
15:00	Conlon 7' (pen.) trialist 19'; Turnbull 40'	Report

26 July 2010	Stockport County	0–1	Inverness Caledonian Thistle	Wincham Park, Northwich
19:30		Report	Sutherland 80'	Attendance: 329

28 July 2010	Woodley Sports	1–0	Stockport County	Lambeth Grove, Stockport
19:30	Clarke 32'	Report

31 July 2010	Glossop North End	0–3	Stockport County	Surrey Street, Glossop
15:00		Report	Donnelly 43'; Conlon 70' (pen.); Poole 85'	Attendance: 458

=== Football League Two ===
7 August 2010 1	Southend United	1–1	Stockport County	Roots Hall
15:00	Sturrock 90'	Report	Donnelly 83'	Attendance: 5,589

14 August 2010 2	Stockport County	0–0	Wycombe Wanderers	Edgeley Park
15:00		Report		Attendance: 3,837

21 August 2010 3	Stevenage	3–1	Stockport County	Broadhall Way
15:00	Griffin 29', 71'; Bostwick 43'		Donnelly 90'	Attendance: 2,726

28 August 2010 4	Stockport County	0–4	Shrewsbury Town	Edgeley Park
15:00			Robinson 41'; Harrold 58'; Wright 63', 82'	Attendance: 4,350

4 September 2010 5	Macclesfield Town	0–2	Stockport County	Moss Rose
15:00			Donnelly 45'; Assoumani 59'	Attendance: 3,683

11 September 2010 6	Stockport County	1–1	Bradford City	Edgeley Park
15:00	Donnelly 78'		Syers 56'	Attendance: 4,277

18 September 2010 7	Oxford United	0–1	Stockport County	Kassam Stadium
15:00			Donnelly 41'	Attendance: 7,033

25 September 2010 8	Stockport County	2–2	Aldershot Town	Edgeley Park
15:00	Turnbull 73', 82'		Straker 27'; M. Morgan 38'	Attendance: 4,231

28 September 2010 9	Stockport County	2–2	Accrington Stanley	Edgeley Park
19:45	Fisher 78'; Donnelly 84'		Procter 40'; Gornell 76'	Attendance: 3,584

2 October 2010 10	Burton Albion	2–1	Stockport County	Pirelli Stadium
15:00	Webster 64', 68'		Turnbull 19'	Attendance: 3,107

9 October 2010 11	Gillingham	2–1	Stockport County	Priestfield Stadium
15:00	McDonald 3'; J. Payne 37'		Pulis 81'	Attendance: 4,755

16 October 2010 12	Stockport County	2–1	Barnet	Edgeley Park
15:00	Donnelly 52'; R. Williams 79'		Byrne 46'	Attendance: 4,177

23 October 2010 13	Lincoln City	0–0	Stockport County	Sincil Bank
15:00				Attendance: 4,809

30 October 2010 14	Stockport County	0–5	Hereford United	Edgeley Park
15:00			Purdie 9', 12'; Manset 52'; Fleetwood 86'; Assoumani 90' (o.g.)	Attendance: 4,017

2 November 2010 15	Morecambe	5–0	Stockport County	Globe Arena
19:45	Jevons 8' (pen.), 38', 66'; Bentley 33'; Brown 68'		Simpson (red card) 8'	Attendance: 2,005

13 November 2010 16	Bury	0–1	Stockport County	Gigg Lane
15:00			Fletcher 15'	Attendance: 4,244

20 November 2010 17	Stockport County	1–1	Torquay United	Edgeley Park
15:00	Tansey 75'		O'Kane 61'	Attendance: 3,772

23 November 2010 18	Stockport County	0–5	Port Vale	Edgeley Park
19:45	Assoumani (red card) 43'		Rigg 23'; M. Richards 44' (pen.), 62' (pen.); J. Richards 90'; Speight 90'	Attendance: 4,571

4 December 2010 19	Northampton Town	2–0	Stockport County	Sixfields Stadium
15:00	Thornton 4'; Jacobs 75'			Attendance: 4,088

11 December 2010 20	Stockport County	3–3	Crewe Alexandra	Edgeley Park
15:00	Tansey 24', 72' (pen.); Poole 54'		Donaldson 45', 47'; Shelley 64'	Attendance: 4,036

28 December 2010 21	Barnet	1–3	Stockport County	Underhill Stadium
15:00	McLeod 54'		Donnelly 51'; Tansey 73', 79' (pen.)	Attendance: 2,045

1 January 2011 22	Chesterfield	4–1	Stockport County	B2net Stadium
15:00	Lester 13', 62', 67'; Davies 90'		Mattis 19' (o.g.)	Attendance: 7,542

3 January 2011 23	Stockport County	0–2	Morecambe	Edgeley Park
15:00			Shuker 29'; Spencer 32'	Attendance: 3,890

8 January 2011 24	Stockport County	1–5	Gillingham	Edgeley Park
15:00	Demontagnac 70'		McDonald 32', 56', 79'; Barcham 51'; Weston 71'	Attendance: 3,573

11 January 2011 25	Stockport County	3–3	Rotherham United	Edgeley Park
19:45	Demontagnac 33'; Husband 50', 68'		Ellison 34'; Grieve 84' (o.g.); R. Taylor 90'	Attendance: 3,612

15 January 2011 26	Hereford United	3–0	Stockport County	Edgar Street
15:00	Halls 3' (o.g.); Manset 25'; Bauzà 86'		Husband (red card) 35'	Attendance: 3,154

22 January 2011 27	Stockport County	3–4	Lincoln City	Edgeley Park
15:00	Griffin 25'; Poole 63'; Watts 74' (o.g.)		Grimes 5', 60', 65'; Watts 45'	Attendance: 4,348

29 January 2011 28	Rotherham United	4–0	Stockport County	Don Valley Stadium
15:00	Brown 12' (o.g.); R. Taylor 21', 57'; Le Fondre 34'			Attendance: 4,876

1 February 2011 29	Stockport County	1–1	Chesterfield	Edgeley Park
19:45	Turnbull 72'		Smalley 74'	Attendance: 4,092

5 February 2011 30	Torquay United	2–0	Stockport County	Plainmoor
15:00	Zebroski 13'; Kee 73'			Attendance: 1,954

12 February 2011 31	Stockport County	2–1	Bury	Edgeley Park
15:00	Paterson 66'; Elding 84'		Lowe 88'	Attendance: 4,903

19 February 2011 32	Stockport County	1–4	Macclesfield Town	Edgeley Park
15:00	Wallace 25'		Reid 33'; Barnett 48'; Turnbull 60' (o.g.); Bencherif 67'	Attendance: 5,470

26 February 2011 33	Bradford City	3–2	Stockport County	Valley Parade
15:00	Williams 14' 74'; Evans 90'		Turnbull 27'; Doble 40'	Attendance: 15,332

1 March 2011 34	Cheltenham Town	2–1	Stockport County	Whaddon Road
19:45	Thomsom 22'; Thomas 67'		Brown 39'	Attendance: 2,191

5 March 2011 35	Stockport County	2–1	Oxford United	Edgeley Park
15:00	Patterson 76'; Tansey 90'		Craddock 49'	Attendance: 4,119

8 March 2011 36	Accrington Stanley	3–0	Stockport County	Crown Ground
19:45	Hessey 28'; Edwards 35' (pen.) 42' (pen.)			Attendance: 1,831

12 March 2011 37	Stockport County	0–0	Burton Albion	Edgeley Park
15:00				Attendance: 4,278

19 March 2011 38	Aldershot Town	1–0	Stockport County	Recreation Ground
15:00	Spencer 90'			Attendance: 2,263

26 March 2011 39	Stockport County	2–1	Southend United	Edgeley Park
13:00	Tansey 28' (pen.); Rowe 90'		Asante 81'	Attendance: 3,335

2 April 2011 40	Wycombe Wanderers	2–0	Stockport County	Adams Park
15:00	Montrose 10'; Rendell 41' (pen.)			Attendance: 6,836

2 April 2011 41	Stockport County	2–2	Stevenage	Edgeley Park
15:00	Tansey 67' (pen.); Peterson 70'		Roberts 59'; Wilson 90'	Attendance: 3,449

16 April 2011 42	Shrewsbury Town	2–0	Stockport County	New Meadow
15:00	Bradshaw 17'; Wroe 20' (pen.)			Attendance: 5,711

23 April 2011 43	Port Vale	1–2	Stockport County	Vale Park
15:00	Rigg 55'		Elding 20' 87'	Attendance: 5,344

25 April 2011 44	Stockport County	2–2	Northampton Town	Edgeley Park
15:00	Rodgers 23' (o.g.); Tansey 88'		Bauza 2'; Harrad 78' (pen.)	Attendance: 4,807

30 April 2011 45	Crewe Alexandra	2–0	Stockport County	Alexandra Stadium
15:00	Goodall 62' (o.g.); Donaldson 65'			Attendance: 4,799

7 May 2011 46	Stockport County	1–1	Cheltenham Town	Edgeley Park
15:00	Tansey 90' (pen.)		Smikle 23'	Attendance: 5,072

=== FA Cup ===
6 November 2010 Round 1	Stockport County	1–1	Peterborough United	Edgeley Park
15:00	Griffin 20'		McLean 28'	Attendance: 2,001

16 November 2010 Round 1 replay	Peterborough United	4–1	Stockport County	London Road Stadium
19:45	Langmead 24'; Mackail-Smith 47'; Tomlin 56'; McLean 90'		Tansey 72'	Attendance: 2,312

=== Football League Cup ===
10 August 2010 Round 1	Stockport County	0–5	Preston North End	Edgeley Park
19:45			Davidson 45' (pen.); James 58'; Hayes 67' (pen.), 73'; King 89'	Attendance: 3,724

=== Football League Trophy ===
26 October 2010 Round 2	Tranmere Rovers	0–0 (4–3 p)	Stockport County	Prenton Park
19:45				Attendance: 2,223
	Penalties
	Thomas-Moore (penalty scored); Labadie (penalty scored); Wootton (penalty scored); Morrow (penalty scored)		R. Williams (penalty scored); Donnelly (penalty missed); Turnbull (penalty scored); Tansey (penalty scored); Griffin (penalty missed)

== Statistics ==
=== Appearances ===
No.	Pos	Nat	Player	Total		League Two		FA Cup		League Cup		League Trophy	
No.	Pos	Nat	Player	Apps	Goals	Apps	Goals	Apps	Goals	Apps	Goals	Apps	Goals
1	GK	(Wales) WAL	Owain Fôn Williams	6	0	5	0	0	0	1	0	0	0
1	GK	(Ireland) EIR	Ian McLoughlin (on loan from Ipswich Town)	7	0	7	0	0	0	0	0	0	0
2	DR	(England) ENG	Mark Lynch	35	0	31	0	2	0	1	0	1	0
3	DL	(England) ENG	Robbie Williams	25	1	22	1	2	0	0	0	1	0
3	DL	(England) ENG	Alan Goodall	13	0	13	0	0	0	0	0	0	0
4	MC	(England) ENG	Paul Turnbull	45	5	41	5	2	0	1	0	1	0
5	DC	(England) ENG	Danny Swailes	14	0	13	0	0	0	1	0	0	0
6	DC	(France) FRA	Mansour Assoumani	40	1	36	1	2	0	1	0	1	0
7	AM	(England) ENG	James Vincent	20	0	20	0	0	0	0	0	0	0
8	MC	(England) ENG	Greg Tansey	41	11	38	10	1	1	1	0	1	0
9	FW	(Ireland) EIR	Barry Conlon	11	0	9	0	1	0	1	0	0	0
9	ST	(England) ENG	Anthony Elding (on loan from Rochdale)	21	3	21	3	0	0	0	0	0	0
10	ST	(England) ENG	George Donnelly (on loan from Plymouth Argyle)	27	8	23	8	2	0	1	0	1	0
10	AM	(Scotland) SCO	Stephen Husband (on loan from Blackpool)	5	2	5	2	0	0	0	0	0	0
10	FW	(Scotland) SCO	Matthew Paterson (on loan from Southend)	10	3	10	3	0	0	0	0	0	0
11	MR	(Ireland) EIR	Richie Partridge	1	0	0	0	0	0	1	0	0	0
11	MC	(Wales) WAL	Anthony Pulis (on loan from Southampton)	13	1	10	1	2	0	0	0	1	0
11	WG	(England) ENG	Ishmel Demontagnac (on loan from Blackpool)	7	2	7	2	0	0	0	0	0	0
11	ST	(Wales) WAL	Ryan Doble (on loan from Southampton)	3	1	3	1	0	0	0	0	0	0
12	WG	(England) ENG	Adam Griffin	48	2	45	1	2	1	0	0	1	0
14	WG	(England) ENG	David Poole	32	2	29	2	2	0	1	0	0	0
15	MC	(England) ENG	Matty Mainwaring	11	0	11	0	0	0	0	0	0	0
16	WG	(England) ENG	Danny Pilkington	6	0	5	0	0	0	1	0	0	0
16	MC	(England) ENG	James Wallace (on loan from Everton)	14	1	14	1	0	0	0	0	0	0
17	DR	(England) ENG	Andy Halls	20	0	19	0	0	0	1	0	0	0
18	WG	(England) ENG	Danny Rowe	19	1	17	1	0	0	1	0	1	0
19	FW	(England) ENG	Tom Fisher	28	1	27	1	0	0	1	0	0	0
20	DC	(England) ENG	Jordan Rose	18	0	15	0	2	0	0	0	1	0
21	MR	(England) ENG	Jake Simpson	21	0	19	0	1	0	0	0	1	0
23	DC	(England) ENG	Gianluca Havern	0	0	0	0	0	0	0	0	0	0
23	ST	(England) ENG	Wes Fletcher (on loan from Burnley)	12	1	9	1	2	0	0	0	1	0
23	DC	(England) ENG	Danny O'Donnell	7	0	7	0	0	0	0	0	0	0
24	MC	(Wales) WAL	Craig Roberts	0	0	0	0	0	0	0	0	0	0
25	GK	(England) ENG	Ian Ormson	0	0	0	0	0	0	0	0	0	0
26	FC	(England) ENG	Jamie Proctor (on loan from Preston North End)	7	0	7	0	0	0	0	0	0	0
26	DC	(England) ENG	Matthew Grieve (on loan from Newcastle United)	3	0	3	0	0	0	0	0	0	0
27	GK	(England) ENG	Matthew Glennon	39	0	36	0	2	0	0	0	1	0
28	WG	(England) ENG	Cameron Darkwah	8	0	6	0	1	0	0	0	1	0
29	FW	(France) FRA	Yannick Salem	6	0	5	0	1	0	0	0	0	0
29	DC	(England) ENG	Aaron Brown (on loan from Leyton Orient)	17	1	17	1	0	0	0	0	0	0
30	GK	(England) ENG	Ryan Allsopp (on loan from West Bromwich Albion)	0	0	0	0	0	0	0	0	0	0
31	DC	(England) ENG	Jack Saville (on loan from Southampton)	0	0	0	0	0	0	0	0	0	0
32	DC	(Scotland) SCO	Tom Aldred (on loan from Watford)	7	0	7	0	0	0	0	0	0	0
32	DR	(England) ENG	Ben Chu-Say	0	0	0	0	0	0	0	0	0	0
39	ST	(England) ENG	Danny Whitehead	0	0	0	0	0	0	0	0	0	0

=== Overall ===
Statistic	Total	League Two	FA Cup	League Cup	League Trophy
Games played	50	46	2	1	1
Games won	9	9	0	0	0
Games drawn	16	14	1	0	1
Games lost	25	23	1	1	0
Goals scored	50	48	2	0	0
Goals conceded	106	96	5	5	0
Goal difference	-56	-48	-3	-5	0
Clean sheets	6	5	0	0	1
Yellow cards	68	64	3	0	1
Red cards	6	6	0	0	0
Best result(s)	Won 3–1 v Barnet (A), League Two, 28 December 2010				
Worst result(s)	Lost 5–0 on four occasions - v Preston North End (H), League Cup, 10 August 2010 v Morecambe (A), League Two, 30 October 2010 v Hereford United (H), League Two, 2 November 2010 v Port Vale (H), League Two, 23 November 2010				
Most appearances	(England) Adam Griffin - 48 (45 starts, 3 substitute)				
Top scorer	(England) Greg Tansey - 10				
Top assists	(England) Paul Turnbull - 4 (England) Jake Simpson - 4				
Worst discipline	(England) Greg Tansey - 10 (yellow card) 0 (red card)				

Last updated: 27 June 2011
Source: Competitions' Wikipedia articles.
