= Assoumani =

Assoumani is a surname. Notable people with the surname include:

- Arnaud Assoumani (born 1985), French athlete
- Azali Assoumani (born 1959), president of the Comoros
- Dehmaine Tabibou Assoumani (born 2005), French footballer
- Mansour Assoumani (born 1983), French footballer
