= Anton Dudik =

Ukrainian footballer (born 2005)

Personal information
- Full name: Anton Rostyslavovych Dudik
- Date of birth: 10 January 2005 (age 21)
- Place of birth: Lutsk, Ukraine
- Height: 6 ft 2 in (1.89 m)
- Position: Forward

Team information
- Current team: Sambir-Nyva-2

Youth career
- Volyn Lutsk
- Shakhtar Donetsk
- Śląsk Wrocław

Senior career*
Years	Team	Apps	(Gls)
2024–2025	Carlisle United	3	(0)
2024	→ South Shields (loan)	8	(0)
2025–2026	Dainava	8	(0)
2026–	Sambir-Nyva-2	8	(3)
2026–	Nyva Ternopil	4	(0)
- * Club domestic league appearances and goals as of 4 June 2026

Anton Rostyslavovych Dudik (Ukrainian: Антон Ростиславович Дудік; born 10 January 2005) is a Ukrainian professional footballer who plays as a forward for Ukrainian Second League club Sambir-Nyva-2.

== Career ==
After playing for Volyn Lutsk, Shakhtar Donetsk and Śląsk Wrocław, on 26 January 2024 Dudik joined Carlisle United on a short-term contract until the end of the season following a successful trial period. Although brought in as a development option, he impressed manager Paul Simpson in training, being rewarded with first-team involvement. On 17 February 2024, he made his debut for the club as a second-half substitute in a 4–0 home defeat to Cambridge United. Following the club's relegation, Dudik was offered a new contract at the end of the 2023–24 season.

In October 2024, Dudik joined National League North side South Shields on an initial one-month loan deal.

On 16 May 2025, Carlisle announced he would be leaving in June when his contract expired.

On 12 September 2025, Dudik made his A Lyga debut for Dainava against Džiugas Club.

== Career statistics ==
As of match played 8 November 2025

Appearances and goals by club, season and competition
Club	Season	League			National cup (Note: Includes FA Cup)		League cup (Note: Includes EFL Cup)		Other		Total	
Club	Season	Division	Apps	Goals	Apps	Goals	Apps	Goals	Apps	Goals	Apps	Goals
Carlisle United	2023–24	League One	2	0	0	0	0	0	0	0	2	0
Carlisle United	2024–25	League Two	1	0	0	0	0	0	1 (Note: Appearance(s) in EFL Trophy)	0	2	0
Carlisle United	Total		3	0	0	0	0	0	1	0	4	0
South Shields (loan)	2024–25	National League North	8	0	0	0	—		1 (Note: Appearance(s) in FA Trophy)	0	9	0
Dainava	2025	A Lyga	8	0	0	0	—		—		8	0
Career total			19	0	0	0	0	0	2	0	21	0
