= Danny Butterworth =

English footballer (born 1999)

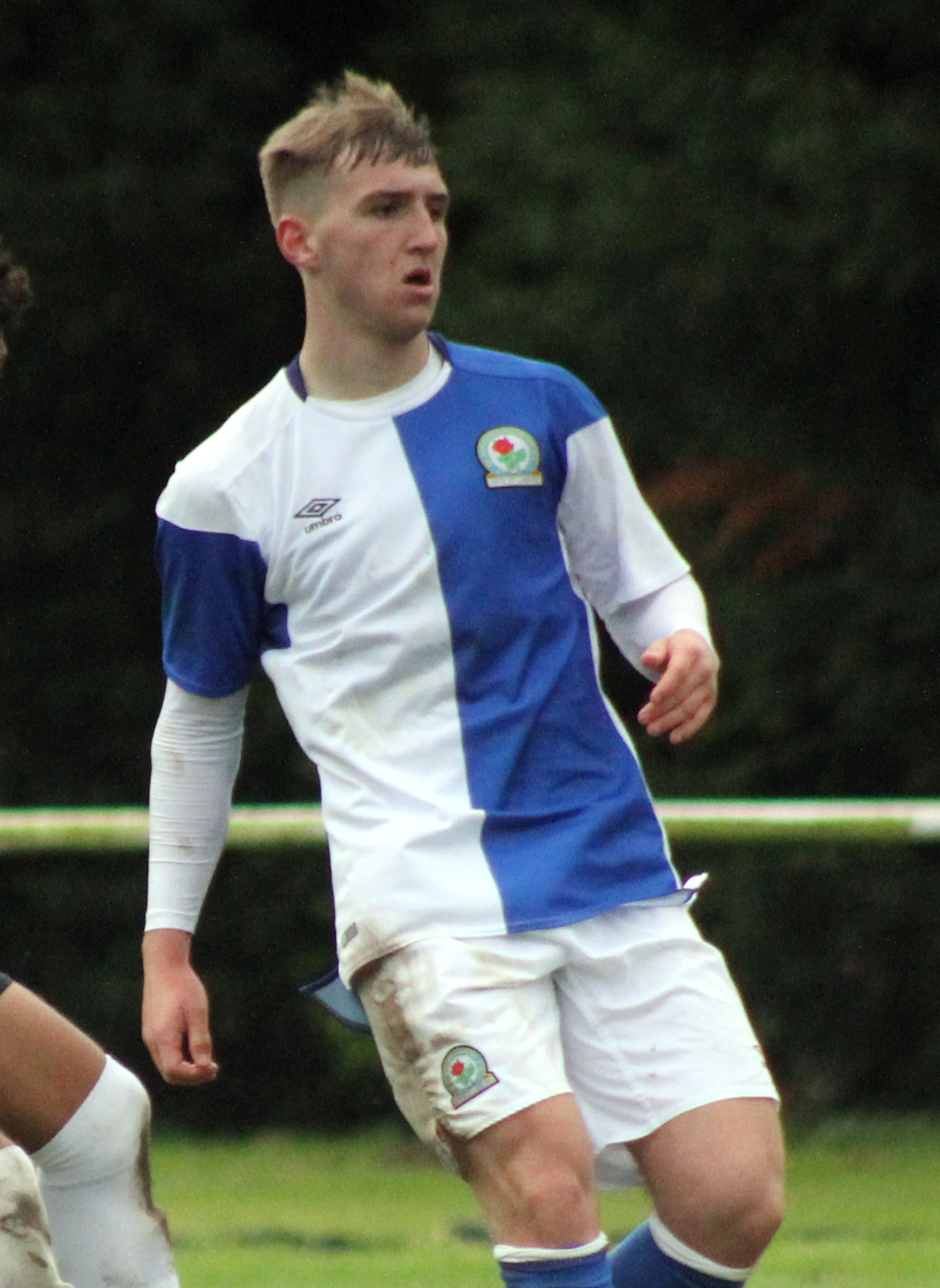
- Butterworth in action for Blackburn Rovers (November 2017)

Personal information
- Full name: Daniel James Butterworth
- Date of birth: 14 September 1999 (age 27)
- Place of birth: Manchester, England
- Height: 5 ft 11 in (1.81 m)
- Position: Forward

Team information
- Current team: Swindon Town
- Number: 14

Youth career
- –2016: Manchester United
- 2016–2018: Blackburn Rovers

Senior career*
Years	Team	Apps	(Gls)
2018–2023	Blackburn Rovers	14	(0)
2022	→ Fleetwood Town (loan)	12	(1)
2022–2023	→ Port Vale (loan)	31	(3)
2023–2024	Carlisle United	31	(4)
2024–	Swindon Town	44	(5)
- * Club domestic league appearances and goals as of 20:27, 3 May 2026 (UTC)

Daniel James Butterworth (born 14 September 1999) is an English professional footballer who plays as a forward for EFL League Two club Swindon Town.

A former Manchester United trainee, Butterworth joined Blackburn Rovers and went on to make his senior debut for the club in August 2018. He spent the second half of the 2021–22 season on loan at Fleetwood Town and joined Port Vale on loan for the 2022–23 campaign. He joined Carlisle United on a free transfer in July 2023 and then moved to Swindon Town 13 months later.

== Career ==
=== Blackburn Rovers ===
Born in Manchester, Butterworth began his career with the club he supported, Manchester United, before he joined Blackburn Rovers on a scholarship midway through the 2015–16 season. He turned professional upon signing a two-year contract in October 2017 after he scored 16 goals in 36 appearances for Damien Johnson's development squad. He made his senior debut at Ewood Park on 28 August 2018, coming on as a 72nd-minute substitute for Danny Graham in a 4–1 victory over Lincoln City in the EFL Cup. He signed a new long-term deal in March the following year, keeping him at the club until June 2022. He made his Championship debut on 22 April, playing the last 14 minutes of a 1–0 home win over Bolton Wanderers. He featured just once in the next two seasons, playing as a substitute in a 1–0 defeat at Stoke City on 19 December 2020. Manager Tony Mowbray said that Butterworth "will burst onto the scene in the next year and everyone is going to think 'wow, who's that?'"

He made his first start in the English Football League on 19 October 2021, in a 1–0 defeat at Queens Park Rangers. On 31 January 2022, he joined League One side Fleetwood Town on loan for the remainder of the 2021–22 season. He scored his first goal in senior football in a 3–2 defeat at Burton Albion on 12 March, scoring with his first touch after entering the game as a substitute. He made five starts and seven substitute appearances for Stephen Crainey's "Cod Army", helping Fleetwood to retain their third tier status with a 20th-place finish.

On 1 September 2022, Butterworth joined League One side Port Vale on loan for the 2022–23 season. Manager Darrell Clarke compared him to the club's number nine, James Wilson, for his link up play. On 29 October, he scored his first goal for the club to secure a 1–0 victory over Lincoln City at Vale Park. He scored his second league goal of the campaign on 19 November, the club website describing how he "produced a beautiful second half solo goal" to beat Charlton Athletic 1–0. Butterworth said after the game that "this is the best I have felt in a long time". Blackburn Rovers released him at the end of his contract after seven years with the club.

=== Carlisle United ===
On 14 July 2023, Butterworth joined newly-promoted League One side Carlisle United on a free transfer, signing a two-year deal. He scored four goals from 33 games in the 2023–24 season as the club were relegated. He then told manager Paul Simpson he wanted to leave in order to find first-team football. Upon leaving Brunton Park, he stated that his spell in Cumbria did not go well due to "things behind closed doors".

=== Swindon Town ===
On 30 August 2024, Butterworth signed for fellow League Two club Swindon Town on a two-year deal. He said he joined the club because he felt wanted by manager Mark Kennedy. He scored his first goal for the "Robins" on 7 September, where his 98th-minute equaliser secured a 1–1 draw at Barrow. After Butterworth claimed his fourth goal of the season in a 5–1 win at Carlisle United on 1 February, new manager Ian Holloway said he was "so instrumental when we're attacking.... if he gets more consistent he'll get picked more consistently". He ended the 2024–25 campaign with six goals in 40 games.

Butterworth worked hard during pre-season to establish himself as a key player for the new campaign. However, he was sidelined four months after he picked up a hamstring injury in October. He underwent surgery, with Holloway explaining that "one of the three strands has completely ruptured, the other two are still intact". He suffered a setback in his recovery in February. He underwent a second operation the following month. He was released at the end of the 2025–26 season, though stayed on to train during pre-season and signed a new five-month deal with the club on 1 September.

== Style of play ==
Butterworth has stated that he likes playing as a number 10, playing alongside a target man and getting into pockets of space. He is able to shoot with both feet. Speaking in November 2022, Port Vale assistant manager Andy Crosby said that "Dan has incredible talent in possession; he can create chances, he can score, he can play the final pass", though added that he needed to improve other aspects of his game.

== Career statistics ==
As of match played 18 October 2025

Appearances and goals by club, season and competition
Club	Season	League			FA Cup		EFL Cup		Other		Total	
Club	Season	Division	Apps	Goals	Apps	Goals	Apps	Goals	Apps	Goals	Apps	Goals
Blackburn Rovers	2018–19	Championship	1	0	0	0	2	0	—		3	0
Blackburn Rovers	2019–20	Championship	0	0	0	0	0	0	—		0	0
Blackburn Rovers	2020–21	Championship	1	0	0	0	0	0	—		1	0
Blackburn Rovers	2021–22	Championship	12	0	1	0	1	0	—		14	0
Blackburn Rovers	2022–23	Championship	0	0	0	0	0	0	—		0	0
Blackburn Rovers	Total		14	0	1	0	3	0	0	0	18	0
Fleetwood Town (loan)	2021–22	League One	12	1	—		—		—		12	1
Port Vale (loan)	2022–23	League One	31	3	1	1	—		2 (Note: Appearances in the EFL Trophy)	0	34	4
Carlisle United	2023–24	League One	28	4	1	0	1	0	3	0	33	4
Carlisle United	2024–25	League Two	3	0	—		1	0	0	0	4	0
Carlisle United	Total		31	4	1	0	2	0	3	0	37	4
Swindon Town	2024–25	League Two	34	5	2	0	—		4	1	40	6
Swindon Town	2025–26	League Two	10	0	0	0	0	0	1	0	11	0
Swindon Town	2026–27	League Two	0	0	0	0	0	0	0	0	0	0
Swindon Town	Total		44	5	2	0	0	0	5	1	51	6
Career total			132	13	5	1	5	0	10	1	152	15
