= 2023–24 Carlisle United F.C. season =

119th season in existence of Carlisle United FC

Carlisle United
2023–24 season
- Chairman: Andrew Jenkins (until 22 November); Castle Sports Group (from 22 November)
- Manager: Paul Simpson
- Stadium: Brunton Park
- League One: 24th (relegated)
- FA Cup: First round (eliminated by Leyton Orient)
- EFL Cup: First round (eliminated by Harrogate Town)
- EFL Trophy: Group stage
- Top goalscorer: League: Jordan Gibson (7); All: Jordan Gibson (9)
- Highest home attendance: 11,443 vs Bolton Wanderers, 27 January 2024
- Lowest home attendance: 716 vs Harrogate Town, 14 November 2023

The 2023–24 season was the 119th season in the history of Carlisle United and their first season back in League One since the 2013–14 season following promotion via the 2023 English Football League play-offs in the previous season. The club participated in League One, the FA Cup, the EFL Cup, and the 2023–24 EFL Trophy.

== Squad statistics ==
As of 16 January 2024

No.	Pos	Nat	Player	Total		League One		FA Cup		League Cup		EFL Trophy	
No.	Pos	Nat	Player	Apps	Goals	Apps	Goals	Apps	Goals	Apps	Goals	Apps	Goals
1	GK	(Czech Republic) CZE	Tomáš Holý	21	0	16+1	0	1	0	1	0	2	0
2	DF	(England) ENG	Fin Back	19	0	17+1	0	0	0	0	0	1	0
3	DF	(Scotland) SCO	Jack Armer	34	1	29+3	1	0	0	1	0	1	0
5	DF	(Scotland) SCO	Samuel Lavelle	40	1	37	1	1	0	1	0	1	0
6	DF	(England) ENG	Paul Huntington	17	1	17	1	0	0	0	0	0	0
7	MF	(England) ENG	Jordan Gibson	39	9	26+8	7	1	0	1	0	1+2	2
8	MF	(England) ENG	Callum Guy	19	0	16	0	1	0	0+1	0	1	0
10	MF	(England) ENG	Alfie McCalmont	30	1	15+11	1	0	0	1	0	2+1	0
11	FW	(England) ENG	Danny Butterworth	27	1	5+17	1	1	0	0+1	0	1+2	0
12	FW	(Finland) FIN	Terry Ablade	16	0	0+12	0	0+1	0	0	0	2+1	0
13	GK	(England) ENG	Gabriel Breeze	4	0	4+0	0	0	0	0	0	0	0
15	MF	(England) ENG	Taylor Charters	18	1	8+8	1	0	0	1	0	0+1	0
16	MF	(England) ENG	Jayden Harris	4	0	0+2	0	0	0	0	0	2	0
17	MF	(Republic of Ireland) IRL	Corey Whelan	7	0	3	0	0+1	0	0	0	3	0
18	DF	(England) ENG	Jack Ellis	12	0	8+1	0	0	0	1	0	2	0
19	DF	(England) ENG	Jack Robinson	21	0	12+5	0	1	0	0+1	0	2	0
21	MF	(Scotland) SCO	Dylan McGeouch	13	0	7+2	0	0+1	0	1	0	2	0
22	DF	(England) ENG	Jon Mellish	42	2	37	2	1	0	1	0	2+1	0
24	FW	(Republic of Ireland) IRL	Sean Maguire	32	2	18+11	2	1	0	0+1	0	0+1	0
25	GK	(Iceland) ISL	Jökull Andrésson	7	0	6	0	0	0	0	0	1	0
26	DF	(England) ENG	Ben Barclay	17	0	10+3	0	1	0	1	0	2	0
27	FW	(England) ENG	Jack Diamond	8	0	7+1	0	0	0	0	0	0	0
28	FW	(Republic of Ireland) IRL	Joshua Kayode	2	0	1	0	0	0	0	0	1	0
32	DF	(England) ENG	Josh Emmanuel	11	0	10+1	0	0	0	0	0	0	0
33	MF	(England) ENG	Harrison Neal	11	0	11	0	0	0	0	0	0	0
34	DF	(Republic of Ireland) IRL	Seán Grehan	2	0	0+2	0	0	0	0	0	0	0
35	FW	(England) ENG	Luke Armstrong	11	2	11	2	0	0	0	0	0	0
36	MF	(England) ENG	Josh Vela	7	2	6+1	2	0	0	0	0	0	0
37	FW	(Ukraine) UKR	Anton Dudik	1	0	0+1	0	0	0	0	0	0	0
40	GK	(England) ENG	Harry Lewis	11	0	11	0	0	0	0	0	0	0
Players who left the club during the season
4	MF	(England) ENG	Owen Moxon	28	3	25+1	3	1	0	0	0	0+1	0
9	FW	(England) ENG	Ryan Edmondson	22	1	5+13	1	0+1	0	0+1	0	1+1	0
14	FW	(England) ENG	Joe Garner	26	4	12+11	3	1	1	0	0	1+1	0
27	FW	(England) ENG	Luke Plange (recalled)	26	2	11+11	2	0+1	0	1	0	2	0

== Current squad ==
As of 4 April 2024

No.	Name	Position	Nationality	Place of birth	Date of birth (age)	Previous club	Date signed	Fee	Contract end
Goalkeepers
1	Tomáš Holý	GK	(Czech Republic)	Rychnov nad Kněžnou	10 December 1991 (age 34)	Ipswich Town	1 July 2022	Free	30 June 2024
13	Gabriel Breeze	GK	(England)		30 December 2003 (age 22)	Academy	1 July 2022	Trainee	30 June 2027
25	Jökull Andrésson	GK	(Iceland)	Mosfellsbær	25 August 2001 (age 25)	Reading	10 August 2023	Loan	31 May 2024
40	Harry Lewis	GK	(England)	Shrewsbury	20 December 1997 (age 28)	Bradford City	11 January 2024	Undisclosed	30 June 2026
Defenders
2	Fin Back	RB	(England)		25 September 2002 (age 24)	Nottingham Forest	24 July 2023	Loan	31 May 2024
3	Jack Armer	LB	(Scotland)	(England) Preston	16 April 2001 (age 25)	Preston North End	6 August 2020	Free	30 June 2026
5	Samuel Lavelle	CB	(Scotland)	(England) Blackpool	3 October 1996 (age 30)	Charlton Athletic	7 July 2023	Undisclosed	30 June 2025
6	Paul Huntington	CB	(England)	Carlisle	17 September 1987 (age 39)	Preston North End	10 August 2022	Free	30 June 2024
17	Corey Whelan	RB	(Republic of Ireland)	(England) Chester	10 December 1997 (age 28)	Wigan Athletic	1 July 2021	Free	30 June 2024
18	Jack Ellis	RB	(England)	Kendal	24 October 2003 (age 23)	Academy	1 July 2022	Trainee	30 June 2025
19	Jack Robinson	LB	(England)		21 June 2001 (age 25)	Middlesbrough	1 July 2023	Free	30 June 2025
22	Jon Mellish	CB	(England)	South Shields	19 September 1997 (age 29)	Gateshead	1 July 2019	Free	30 June 2026
26	Ben Barclay	CB	(England)	Manchester	7 October 1996 (age 30)	Stockport County	30 June 2023	Free	30 June 2025
29	Aran Firzpatrick	CB	(England)		7 February 2006 (age 20)	Academy	13 November 2023	Trainee	30 June 2024
30	Josh O'Brien	CB	(England)		24 April 2006 (age 20)	Academy	13 November 2023	Trainee	30 June 2024
32	Josh Emmanuel	RB	(England)	London	18 August 1997 (age 29)	Grimsby Town	23 November 2023	Free	30 June 2024
Midfielders
7	Jordan Gibson	RM	(England)	Birmingham	26 February 1998 (age 28)	(Republic of Ireland) Sligo Rovers	30 August 2021	Undisclosed	30 June 2024
8	Callum Guy	CM	(England)	Nottingham	25 November 1996 (age 29)	Blackpool	30 January 2020	Undisclosed	30 June 2025
10	Alfie McCalmont	CM	(Northern Ireland)	(England) Thirsk	25 March 2000 (age 26)	Leeds United	27 June 2023	Undisclosed	30 June 2025
15	Taylor Charters	CM	(England)	Whitehaven	2 October 2001 (age 25)	Academy	15 August 2019	Trainee	30 June 2025
21	Dylan McGeouch	CM	(Scotland)	Glasgow	15 January 1993 (age 33)	Forest Green Rovers	7 July 2023	Free	30 June 2025
33	Harrison Neal	CM	(England)		12 May 2001 (age 25)	Sheffield United	4 January 2024	Undisclosed	30 June 2026
36	Josh Vela	CM	(England)	Salford	14 December 1993 (age 32)	Fleetwood Town	25 January 2024	Free	30 June 2025
Forwards
9	Georgie Kelly	CF	(Republic of Ireland)	Burnfoot	12 November 1996 (age 29)	Rotherham United	1 February 2024	Undisclosed	30 June 2027
11	Danny Butterworth	CF	(England)	Manchester	14 September 1999 (age 27)	Blackburn Rovers	14 July 2023	Free	30 June 2025
12	Terry Ablade	CF	(Finland)	(Ghana) Accra	12 October 2001 (age 25)	Fulham	22 August 2023	Loan	31 May 2024
24	Sean Maguire	CF	(Republic of Ireland)	(England) Luton	1 May 1994 (age 32)	Coventry City	29 July 2023	Free	30 June 2024
27	Jack Diamond	LW	(England)	Gateshead	12 January 2000 (age 26)	Sunderland	25 January 2024	Loan	31 May 2024
28	Joshua Kayode	CF	(Republic of Ireland)	(Nigeria) Lagos	4 May 2000 (age 26)	Rotherham United	1 September 2023	Loan	31 May 2024
31	Romeo Park	CF	(England)		16 September 2005 (age 21)	Academy	11 November 2023	Trainee	30 June 2024
35	Luke Armstrong	CF	(England)	Durham	2 July 1996 (age 30)	Harrogate Town	1 January 2024	Undisclosed	30 June 2025
37	Anton Dudik	CF	(Ukraine)			(Poland) Śląsk Wrocław	26 January 2024	Free	30 June 2024
Out on Loan
16	Jayden Harris	CM	(England)	Croydon	4 September 1999 (age 27)	Aldershot Town	2 August 2022	Undisclosed	30 June 2025
—N/a	Max Kilsby	LB	(England)	North Shields	4 October 2003 (age 23)	Academy	1 July 2022	Trainee	30 June 2024

== Transfers ==
=== In ===
Date	Pos	Player	Transferred from	Fee	Ref
27 June 2023	CM	Alfie McCalmont (NIR)	Leeds United (ENG)	Undisclosed	
30 June 2023	CB	Ben Barclay (ENG)	Stockport County (ENG)	Free transfer	
1 July 2023	LB	Jack Robinson (ENG)	Middlesbrough (ENG)	Free transfer	
7 July 2023	CB	Sam Lavelle (SCO)	Charlton Athletic (ENG)	Undisclosed	
7 July 2023	CM	Dylan McGeouch (SCO)	Forest Green Rovers (ENG)	Free transfer	
14 July 2023	CF	Danny Butterworth (ENG)	Blackburn Rovers (ENG)	Free transfer	
29 July 2023	CF	Sean Maguire (IRL)	Coventry City (ENG)	Free transfer	
23 November 2023	RB	Josh Emmanuel (ENG)	Free agent	—N/a	
1 January 2024	CF	Luke Armstrong (ENG)	Harrogate Town (ENG)	Undisclosed	
4 January 2024	CM	Harrison Neal (ENG)	Sheffield United (ENG)	Undisclosed	
11 January 2024	GK	Harry Lewis (ENG)	Bradford City (ENG)	Undisclosed	
25 January 2024	CM	Josh Vela (ENG)	Fleetwood Town (ENG)	Free transfer	
26 January 2024	AM	Anton Dudik (UKR)	Free agent	—N/a	
1 February 2024	CF	Georgie Kelly (IRL)	Rotherham United (ENG)	Undisclosed	

=== Out ===
Date	Pos	Player	Transferred to	Fee	Ref
30 June 2023	RW	Lewis Bell (ENG)	Gretna 2008 (SCO)	Released	
30 June 2023	MF	Matt Bell (ENG)	Workington (ENG)	Released	
30 June 2023	CF	Nic Bollado (ENG)	Stockport County (ENG)	Released	
30 June 2023	GK	Lewis Boyd (ENG)	Carlisle City (ENG)	Released	
30 June 2023	CF	Kristian Dennis (ENG)	Tranmere Rovers (ENG)	Rejected Contract	
30 June 2023	AM	Jamie Devitt (IRL)	Workington (ENG)	Released	
30 June 2023	LM	Brennan Dickenson (ENG)	Oldham Athletic (ENG)	Released	
30 June 2023	CM	Josh Dixon (ENG)	Annan Athletic (SCO)	Released	
30 June 2023	CB	Morgan Feeney (ENG)	Shrewsbury Town (ENG)	Free transfer	
30 June 2023	CF	Sam Fishburn (ENG)	Fleetwood Town (ENG)	Released	
30 June 2023	DF	Harvey Gordon (ENG)	Free agent	Released	
30 June 2023	FW	Mason Hardy (ENG)	Northallerton Town (ENG)	Released	
30 June 2023	MF	Dan Hill (ENG)	Carlisle City (ENG)	Released	
30 June 2023	GK	Michael Kelly (IRL)	Milton Keynes Dons (ENG)	Released	
30 June 2023	LW	Omari Patrick (ENG)	Sutton United (ENG)	Free transfer	
30 June 2023	DF	Alex Potts (ENG)	Gretna 2008 (SCO)	Released	
30 June 2023	RB	Joel Senior (ENG)	Morecambe (ENG)	Released	
30 June 2023	CF	Tobi Sho-Silva (ENG)	Maidenhead United (ENG)	Released	
30 June 2023	GK	Scott Simons (ENG)	Carlisle City (ENG)	Released	
18 January 2024	CF	Ryan Edmondson (ENG)	Central Coast Mariners (AUS)	Mutual Consent	
31 January 2024	CF	Joe Garner (ENG)	Oldham Athletic (ENG)	Free transfer	
1 February 2024	CM	Owen Moxon (ENG)	Portsmouth (ENG)	Undisclosed	

=== Loaned in ===
Date	Pos	Player	Loaned from	Until	Ref
24 July 2023	RB	Fin Back (ENG)	Nottingham Forest (ENG)	End of season	
1 August 2023	CF	Luke Plange (ENG)	Crystal Palace (ENG)	4 January 2024	
10 August 2023	GK	Jökull Andrésson (ISL)	Reading (ENG)	End of season	
22 August 2023	CF	Terry Ablade (FIN)	Fulham (ENG)	End of season	
1 September 2023	CF	Joshua Kayode (IRL)	Rotherham United (ENG)	End of season	
4 January 2024	CB	Seán Grehan (IRL)	Crystal Palace (ENG)	4 April 2024 (Note: On 4 April, Grehan returned to parent-club, Crystal Palace, early.)	
25 January 2024	LW	Jack Diamond (ENG)	Sunderland (ENG)	End of season	

=== Loaned out ===
Date	Pos	Player	Loaned to	Until	Ref
4 August 2023	LB	Max Kilsby (ENG)	Annan Athletic (SCO)	1 January 2024	
1 September 2023	CM	Kai Nugent (ENG)	Annan Athletic (SCO)	End of season	
16 October 2023	CM	Jayden Harris (ENG)	Eastleigh (ENG)	8 January 2024	
1 February 2024	LB	Max Kilsby (ENG)	Queen of the South (SCO)	End of season	

== Pre-season and friendlies ==
On 16 June, Carlisle United announced their pre-season schedule, with friendlies against Annan Athletic, Gretna, Workington, Newcastle United U21 and Dundee United set.

Win Draw Loss Fixtures

7 July 2023 Friendly	Annan Athletic	1–2	Carlisle United	Annan, Scotland
19:45 BST	Galloway 9'	Report	Armer 83'; Trialist 90'	Stadium: Galabank; Attendance: 1,750; Referee: Michael Williamson

11 July 2023 Friendly	Gretna 2008	0–7	Carlisle United	Gretna, Scotland
19:30 BST		Report	Garner 18'; Gibson 28'; Robinson 42'; McCalmont 48'; Park 52'; Nugent 56'; 57' (o.g.)	Stadium: Raydale Park; Attendance: 1,046

15 July 2023 Friendly	Workington	0–3	Carlisle United	Workington
15:00 BST		Report	Ellis 35'; McCalmont 48'; Gibson 54'	Stadium: Borough Park; Attendance: 1,523; Referee: Anthony Backhouse

18 July 2023 Friendly	Livingston	1–1	Carlisle United	St Andrews, Scotland
12:00 BST		Report	Edmondson 73'	Stadium: University of St Andrews; Attendance: 0 (behind closed doors)

22 July 2023 Friendly	Newcastle United U21	0–2	Carlisle United	Gateshead
14:00 BST		Report	Ndiweni 19' (o.g.); Edmondson 89'	Stadium: Gateshead International Stadium

25 July 2023 Friendly	Chorley	1–1	Carlisle United	Chorley
19:00 BST	Johnson 50'	Report	Harris 41'	Stadium: Victory Park; Attendance: 766

29 July 2023 Friendly	Carlisle United	0–2	Dundee United	Carlisle
15:00 BST		Report	Moult 32'; Middleton 44'	Stadium: Brunton Park; Attendance: 2,853 (738 away fans); Referee: Anthony Backhouse

== Competitions ==
=== Overall record ===
Competition	Starting round	Final position	Record							
Competition	Starting round	Final position	Pld	W	D	L	GF	GA	GD	Win %
League One	Matchday 1	24th	45	7	9	29	41	79	−38	15.56
FA Cup	First round	First round	1	0	0	1	1	3	−2	0.00
EFL Cup	First round	First round	1	0	0	1	0	1	−1	0.00
EFL Trophy	Group stage	Group stage	3	1	0	2	2	3	−1	33.33
Total			50	8	9	33	44	86	−42	16.00

Last updated: 20 April 2024
Source: Soccerway

=== League One ===
==== League table ====
Pos	Team	Pld	W	D	L	GF	GA	GD	Pts	Promotion, qualification or relegation
19	Shrewsbury Town	46	13	9	24	35	67	−32	48	
20	Burton Albion	46	12	10	24	39	67	−28	46	
21	Cheltenham Town (R)	46	12	8	26	41	65	−24	44	Relegation to EFL League Two
22	Fleetwood Town (R)	46	10	13	23	49	72	−23	43	Relegation to EFL League Two
23	Port Vale (R)	46	10	11	25	41	74	−33	41	Relegation to EFL League Two
24	Carlisle United (R)	46	7	9	30	41	81	−40	30	Relegation to EFL League Two

Source: EFL Official Website
Rules for classification: 1) Points; 2) Goal difference; 3) Number of goals scored; 4) Head-to-head results; 5) Wins; 6) Away goals; 7) Penalty points (sec 9.5); 8) 12-point sending off offences
(R) Relegated

==== Results summary ====
Overall								Home						Away					
Pld	W	D	L	GF	GA	GD	Pts	W	D	L	GF	GA	GD	W	D	L	GF	GA	GD
45	7	9	29	41	79	−38	30	3	6	14	21	42	−21	4	3	15	20	37	−17

Last updated: 20 April 2024.
Source: Soccerway

==== Results by round ====
Round	1	2	3	4	5	6	7	8	9	10	11	12	13	14	15	16	17	19	20	21	22	23	24	25	26	27	28	18^{1}	30	31	32	34	35	33^{3}	36	37	38	39	40	41	42	43	29^{2}	44	45	46
Ground	H	A	H	H	A	H	A	A	H	A	H	A	H	A	H	A	H	H	A	A	H	H	A	A	H	A	H	A	H	A	H	H	A	A	H	A	H	A	H	A	H	A	A	H	H	A
Result	D	L	D	L	L	W	D	D	L	L	D	W	L	L	W	L	L	D	L	L	D	L	D	L	W	L	L	L	L	L	L	L	L	W	L	L	L	L	D	W	L	L	W	L	L	L
Position	11	16	18	20	21	19	19	18	19	19	20	19	20	20	20	21	22	22	22	22	21	23	24	24	22	23	23	23	23	24	24	24	24	24	24	24	24	24	24	24	24	24	24	24	24	24

Updated to match(es) played on 20 April 2024. Source: Soccerway
A = Away; H = Home; W = Win; D = Draw; L = Loss; P = Postponed
Notes:
- ^{1} Matchday 18 (vs Barnsley) was postponed due to the international call-ups.
- ^{2} Matchday 29 (vs Cheltenham Town) was postponed due to a frozen pitch.
- ^{3} Matchday 33 (vs Burton Albion) was postponed due to a waterlogged pitch.

==== Matches ====
On 22 June, the EFL League One fixtures were released.

Win Draw Loss Fixtures

5 August 2023 1	Carlisle United	1–1	Fleetwood Town	Carlisle
15:00 BST	Moxon 36'	Report	Sarpong-Wiredu 45+4'	Stadium: Brunton Park; Attendance: 10,279 (423 away); Referee: Peter Wright

12 August 2023 2	Oxford United	1–0	Carlisle United	Littlemore
15:00 BST	Harris 76'	Report	Guy (yellow card) 51'; McCalmont (yellow card) 60'; Back (yellow card) 62'; Huntington (yellow card) 73'	Stadium: Kassam Stadium; Attendance: 7,964 (770 away); Referee: Jeremy Simpson

15 August 2023 3	Carlisle United	1–1	Wigan Athletic	Carlisle
19:45 BST	Mellish (yellow card) 54'; Moxon 56'; Maguire (yellow card) 67'; Armer (yellow card) 83'; Lavelle (yellow card) 90+9'	Report	Clare (yellow card) 19'; Wyke 34'; Pearce (yellow card) 58'	Stadium: Brunton Park; Attendance: 8,649 (1,405 away); Referee: Marc Edwards

19 August 2023 4	Carlisle United	0–2	Exeter City	Carlisle
15:00 BST		Report	Mitchell (yellow card) 25', (goal) 81'; Trevitt 68'	Stadium: Brunton Park; Attendance: 7,610 (318 away); Referee: Adam Herczeg

26 August 2023 5	Port Vale	1–0	Carlisle United	Burslem
15:00 BST	Wilson 50' (pen.)	Report		Stadium: Vale Park; Attendance: 6,997 (705 away); Referee: Tom Reeves

2 September 2023 6	Carlisle United	2–0	Shrewsbury Town	Carlisle
15:00 BST	Bayliss 57' (o.g.); Guy (yellow card) 82'; Garner 90+6' (yellow card) 90+6'	Report	Bowman (yellow card) 45'; Feeney (yellow card) 62'; Winchester (yellow card) 75'; Anderson (yellow card) 90+1'	Stadium: Brunton Park; Attendance: 7,395 (304 away); Referee: Ben Toner

9 September 2023 7	Stevenage	2–2	Carlisle United	Stevenage
15:00 BST	Reid 15', 74'; McNeill (yellow card) 37'; Roberts (yellow card) 72'	Report	Maguire 20'; Gibson (yellow card) 31'; Guy (yellow card) 83'; Garner 90'	Stadium: Broadhall Way; Attendance: 4,228 (428 away); Referee: Darren Drysdale

16 September 2023 8	Lincoln City	1–1	Carlisle United	Lincoln
15:00 BST	Hamilton 49'; Duffy (yellow card) 77'	Report	Plange 19' (yellow card) 59'; Garner (yellow card) 72'; Mellish (yellow card) 77'; Lavelle (yellow card) 83'; Moxon (yellow card) 89'	Stadium: Sincil Bank; Attendance: 8,514 (645 away); Referee: Tom Nield

23 September 2023 9	Carlisle United	0–2	Derby County	Carlisle
15:00 BST	Lavelle (yellow card) 90+4'	Report	Collins 18', 84' (pen.); Cashin (yellow card) 75'	Stadium: Brunton Park; Attendance: 11,186 (1,533 away); Referee: Martin Coy

30 September 2023 10	Wycombe Wanderers	2–0	Carlisle United	High Wycombe
15:00 BST	Leahy 40' (pen.); Stryjek (yellow card) 54'; Forino-Joseph (yellow card) 65'; Vokes 74'	Report	Moxon (yellow card) 17'; Andrésson (red card) 29'	Stadium: Adams Park; Attendance: 5,499 (405 away); Referee: Scott Tallis

3 October 2023 11	Carlisle United	1–1	Peterborough United	Carlisle
19:45 BST	Back (yellow card) 76'; Moxon (yellow card) 90+3'; Gibson 90+6'	Report	Edwards 72'	Stadium: Brunton Park; Attendance: 6,014 (296 away); Referee: Scott Simpson

7 October 2023 12	Bolton Wanderers	1–3	Carlisle United	Horwich
15:00 BST	Mellish 28' (o.g.); Dempsey (yellow card) 35'; Charles (yellow card) 82'	Report	Lavelle (yellow card) 7'; Garner (penalty missed) 35'; McCalmont (yellow card) 38'; Gibson 44' (pen.) 70' 90+5'; Armer (yellow card) 90+6'	Stadium: Toughsheet Community Stadium; Attendance: 23,187 (4,407 away); Referee: Seb Stocksbridge

14 October 2023 13	Carlisle United	0–1	Leyton Orient	Carlisle
15:00 BST		Report	Sotiriou 21'; Brown (yellow card) 38'; Turns (yellow card) 75'; El Mizouni (yellow card) 90+3'	Stadium: Brunton Park; Attendance: 8,355 (424 away); Referee: Edward Duckworth

21 October 2023 14	Portsmouth	1–0	Carlisle United	Portsmouth
15:00 BST	Rafferty (yellow card) 78'; Shaughnessy 90+3'	Report	McCalmont (yellow card) 48'; Guy (yellow card) 70'; Garner (yellow card) 73'	Stadium: Fratton Park; Attendance: 17,911 (676 away); Referee: Leigh Doughty

24 October 2023 15	Carlisle United	2–1	Burton Albion	Carlisle
19:45 GMT	Gibson 53'; Garner (yellow card) 77' (goal) 88'	Report	Hamer (yellow card) 25'; Helm 28' (yellow card) 36'; Lubala (yellow card) 77'	Stadium: Brunton Park; Attendance: 6,390 (166 away); Referee: Ross Joyce

28 October 2023 16	Cambridge United	1–0	Carlisle United	Cambridge
15:00 GMT	Lankester (yellow card) 30'; Bennett (yellow card) 37'; Thomas 73'	Report	Armer (yellow card) 47' (yellow-red card) 83'; McCalmont (red card) 90+2'	Stadium: Abbey Stadium; Attendance: 6,513 (661 away); Referee: Sam Purkiss

11 November 2023 17	Carlisle United	0–1	Bristol Rovers	Carlisle
15:00 GMT	Barclay (yellow card) 5'; Garner (yellow card) 14'; Gibson (yellow card) 90+1'; Moxon (yellow card) 90+5'	Report	Woods (yellow card) 14'; Lavelle 38' (o.g.); Friend (yellow card) 45+2'; Collins (yellow card) 51'; Crama (red card) 73'	Stadium: Brunton Park; Attendance: 7,838 (597 away); Referee: Martin Woods

18 November 2023	Barnsley	Postponed	Carlisle United	Barnsley
15:00 GMT				Stadium: Oakwell
Note: Fixture was postponed due to international call-ups within the Barnsley squad.

25 November 2023 19	Carlisle United	1–1	Charlton Athletic	Carlisle
15:00 GMT	Lavelle 62'	Report	Blackett-Taylor 54'	Stadium: Brunton Park; Attendance: 10,477 (964 away); Referee: Leigh Doughty

28 November 2023 20	Reading	5–1	Carlisle United	Reading
19:45 GMT	Lavelle 26' (o.g.); Knibbs 32', 39'; Dorsett (yellow card) 54'; Wing 78'; Azeez 83'	Report	Plange 29'; Armer (yellow card) 33'	Stadium: Madejski Stadium; Attendance: 8,455 (556 away); Referee: Charles Breakspear

9 December 2023 21	Blackpool	3–0	Carlisle United	Blackpool
15:00 GMT	Lyons 22'; Rhodes 67', 90+5'	Report	Barclay (yellow card) 5'; McGeouch (yellow card) 43'; Robinson (yellow card) 88'	Stadium: Bloomfield Road; Attendance: 11,848 (1,977 away); Referee: Lewis Smith

16 December 2023 22	Carlisle United	2–2	Northampton Town	Carlisle
15:00 GMT	Armer 67'; Edmondson 81'	Report	McWilliams 30'; Brough (yellow card) 34'; Bowie (yellow card) 69' (goal) 90+3'	Stadium: Brunton Park; Attendance: 6,744 (371 away); Referee: Daniel Middleton

23 December 2023 23	Carlisle United	0–1	Cheltenham Town	Carlisle
15:00 GMT	Lavelle (yellow card) 38'; Moxon (yellow card) 67'	Report	Sercombe 27'; Bonds (yellow card) 40'; Freestone (yellow card) 82'; Long (yellow card) 90+5'	Stadium: Brunton Park; Attendance: 7,814 (172 away); Referee: Declan Bourne

26 December 2023 24	Fleetwood Town	1–1	Carlisle United	Fleetwood
15:00 GMT	Stockley 35'; Sarpong-Wiredu (yellow card) 65'	Report	Moxon 27'	Stadium: Highbury Stadium; Attendance: 3,862 (1,079 away); Referee: Adam Herczeg

29 December 2023 25	Wigan Athletic	2–0	Carlisle United	Wigan
19:00 GMT	Magennis 16' (pen.); Morrison 36', (yellow card) 66'; Clare (yellow card) 45+2'; Shaw (yellow card) 72'; Watts (yellow card) 90+6'	Report	Edmondson (yellow card) 45+2'; Robinson (yellow card) 47'; Barclay (yellow card) 54'; Mellish (yellow card) 60'; Moxon (yellow card) 82'; Maguire (yellow card) 90+1'	Stadium: DW Stadium; Attendance: 13,224 (4,128 away); Referee: Ben Toner

1 January 2024 26	Carlisle United	2–1	Port Vale	Carlisle
15:00 GMT	Robinson (yellow card) 23'; Mellish (yellow card) 45+1', (goal) 90+3'; Moxon (yellow card) 51'; Gibson 80' (pen.)	Report	Iacovitti (yellow card) 33'; Garrity 49'; Wilson (yellow card) 65'	Stadium: Brunton Park; Attendance: 7,758 (622 away); Referee: Thomas Kirk

6 January 2024 27	Exeter City	2–1	Carlisle United	Exeter
15:00 GMT	Harris (yellow card) 5'; Cole 57'; Jules (yellow card) 67'; Cox 77'; Wildschut (yellow card) 90'; Scott (yellow card) 90+8'	Report	Neal (yellow card) 64'; Butterworth 86'	Stadium: St James Park; Attendance: 6,420 (294 away); Referee: Carl Brook

13 January 2024 28	Carlisle United	1–3	Oxford United	Carlisle
15:00 GMT	Moxon (yellow card) 27'; Neal (yellow card) 31'; Mellish (yellow card) 43'; McCalmont 71'; Garner (yellow card) 72'	Report	Harris 39', 47'; Bennett (yellow card) 53'; Goodrham 67'; Smyth (yellow card) 72'	Stadium: Brunton Park; Attendance: 7,827 (562 away); Referee: Jacob Miles

16 January 2024 18	Barnsley	2–1	Carlisle United	Barnsley
19:45 GMT	Cole 58'; Kane 86' (pen.)	Report	Armstrong 7' (yellow card) 81'	Stadium: Oakwell; Attendance: 11,507 (883 away); Referee: Will Finnie
Note: Fixture was originally scheduled for 18 November, but postponed due to international call-ups within the Barnsley squad.

20 January 2024	Cheltenham Town	Postponed	Carlisle United	Cheltenham
15:00 GMT				Stadium: Whaddon Road
Note: Fixture was postponed due to a frozen pitch.

27 January 2024 30	Carlisle United	1–4	Bolton Wanderers	Carlisle
15:00 GMT	Mellish (yellow card) 51'; Gibson 71'	Report	Ashworth 31'; Maghoma 36'; Toal (yellow card) 62'; Dacres-Cogley (yellow card) 85'; Dempsey 90+1'; Ogbeta 90+7'	Stadium: Brunton Park; Attendance: 11,443 (3,044 away); Referee: Scott Oldham

3 February 2024 31	Leyton Orient	3–2	Carlisle United	Leyton
15:00 GMT	Forde 40', 45+4' (yellow card) 83'; Galbraith (yellow card) 56'; Sotiriou 58'; El Mizouni (yellow card) 69'; Hunt (yellow card) 81'	Report	Vela 21'; Maguire 90+5' (pen.)	Stadium: Brisbane Road; Attendance: 8,468 (828 away); Referee: Ollie Yates

10 February 2024 32	Carlisle United	0–1	Portsmouth	Carlisle
15:00 GMT	Vela (yellow card) 29'	Report	Lane 62'	Stadium: Brunton Park; Attendance: 9,053 (1,848 away); Referee: Martin Woods

13 February 2024	Burton Albion	Postponed	Carlisle United	Burton upon Trent
19:45 GMT				Stadium: Pirelli Stadium
Note: Fixture was postponed due to a waterlogged pitch.

17 February 2024 34	Carlisle United	0–4	Cambridge United	Carlisle
15:00 GMT	Mellish (yellow card) 45+4'; Butterworth (yellow card) 68'	Report	Kaikai 14'; Taylor (yellow card) 45+4'; Lavelle 69' (o.g.); Kachunga 72'; Bennett 83'	Stadium: Brunton Park; Attendance: 6,877 (442 away); Referee: Scott Jackson

24 February 2024 35	Bristol Rovers	2–1	Carlisle United	Horfield
15:00 GMT	Hunt (yellow card) 22'; Martin 34'; Thomas (yellow card) 50'; Sinclair 51'; Marquis (yellow card) 90+4'	Report	Vela 16'; Neal (yellow card) 56'; Armstrong (yellow card) 90+3'	Stadium: Memorial Stadium; Attendance: 8,679 (468 away); Referee: Thomas Parsons

27 February 2024 33	Burton Albion	0–1	Carlisle United	Burton upon Trent
19:45 GMT		Report	Diamond (yellow card) 12'; Huntington 27'; Vela (yellow card) 86'	Stadium: Pirelli Stadium; Attendance: 2,247 (246 away); Referee: Craig Hicks
Note: Fixture was originally scheduled for 13 February, but was postponed due to a waterlogged pitch.

2 March 2024 36	Carlisle United	1–3	Reading	Carlisle
15:00 GMT	Mellish 71'	Report	Smith 17'; Knibbs 36', 57'	Stadium: Brunton Park; Attendance: 7,891 (1,360 away); Referee: Martin Coy

9 March 2024 37	Charlton Athletic	3–2	Carlisle United	Charlton
15:00 GMT	Anderson (yellow card) 7'; May 37', 75'; Edmonds-Green (yellow card) 46'; Kanu 54'	Report	Armstrong 20'; McGeouch (yellow card) 44'; Charters 63' (pen.)	Stadium: The Valley; Attendance: 13,978 (872 away); Referee: Tom Nield

12 March 2024 38	Carlisle United	2–3	Barnsley	Carlisle
19:45 GMT	Armstrong 10'; Butterworth 87'	Report	Williams 33'; McAtee 49'; O'Keeffe (yellow card) 66'; Russell 76'; Killip (yellow card) 90'; Grant (yellow card) 90+4'	Stadium: Brunton Park; Attendance: 5,522 (813 away); Referee: Edward Duckworth

16 March 2024 39	Shrewsbury Town	1–0	Carlisle United	Shrewsbury
15:00 GMT	Perry (yellow card) 7'; Udoh 40'	Report	Neal (yellow card) 4'; McGeouch (yellow card) 25'	Stadium: New Meadow; Attendance: 6,721 (559 away); Referee: Simon Mather

23 March 2024 40	Carlisle United	2–2	Stevenage	Carlisle
15:00 GMT	Butterworth 13', 65', (yellow card) 72'; Charters (yellow card) 45+2'; Neal (yellow card) 67'; Lewis (yellow card) 77'	Report	Freeman (yellow card) 29'; Roberts (yellow card) 39'; MacDonald 82' (pen.); Vancooten 90+6'	Stadium: Brunton Park; Attendance: 7,634 (232 away); Referee: Daniel Middleton

29 March 2024 41	Peterborough United	1–3	Carlisle United	Peterborough
15:00 GMT	Randall 61'	Report	Ellis (yellow card) 7'; Mellish 27', (yellow card) 33', (goal) 49', 58'	Stadium: London Road Stadium; Attendance: 10,080 (486 away); Referee: Will Finnie

1 April 2024 42	Carlisle United	1–3	Lincoln City	Carlisle
15:00 BST	Lavelle 80'; Barclay (yellow card) 85'; Emmanuel (yellow card) 90+2'	Report	House 10'; Taylor 53'; Bishop 90+3'	Stadium: Brunton Park; Attendance: 7,103 (724 away); Referee: Seb Stockbridge

6 April 2024 43	Northampton Town	2–0	Carlisle United	Northampton
15:00 BST	Bowie 33'; Koiki 90+4'	Report		Stadium: Sixfields Stadium; Attendance: 6,328 (335 away); Referee: Ross Joyce

9 April 2024 29	Cheltenham Town	0–1	Carlisle United	Cheltenham
19:45 BST		Report	Huntington (yellow card) 7'; Lavelle 42', (yellow card) 85'; Robinson (yellow card) 78'	Stadium: Whaddon Road; Attendance: 4,682 (391 away); Referee: David Rock
Note: Fixture was originally scheduled for 20 January, but was postponed due to a frozen pitch.

13 April 2024 44	Carlisle United	0–1	Blackpool	Carlisle
15:00 BST	Harris (yellow card) 83'	Report	Dembélé 1'	Stadium: Brunton Park; Attendance: 7,600 (1,548 away); Referee: Tom Reeves

20 April 2024 45	Carlisle United	1–3	Wycombe Wanderers	Carlisle
15:00 BST	Neal (yellow card) 4'; McCalmont 28'; Dudik (yellow card) 66'	Report	McCleary 15', 75'; Potts (yellow card) 45'; Kone 49'	Stadium: Brunton Park; Attendance: 6,538 (298 away); Referee: Ben Speedie

27 April 2024 46	Derby County	2–0	Carlisle United	Derby
15:00 BST				Stadium: Pride Park Stadium; Attendance: 31,027 (1,714 away); Referee: Ben Toner

=== FA Cup ===
Carlisle United were drawn away to Leyton Orient in the first round.

Win Draw Loss Fixtures

4 November 2023 First round	Leyton Orient	3–1	Carlisle United	Leyton
15:00 GMT	Cooper (yellow card) 8'; Pigott 11' (pen.); Forde (yellow card) 14'; El Mizouni (yellow card) 60'; Drinan 65'; Happe (yellow card) 70'; Sotiriou 90+1'; Sweeney (yellow card) 90+6'	Report	Garner 50'; Robinson (yellow card) 72'	Stadium: Brisbane Road; Attendance: 3,808; Referee: Seb Stockbridge

=== EFL Cup ===
Carlisle were drawn against Harrogate Town away in the first round.

Win Draw Loss Fixtures

8 August 2023 First round	Harrogate Town	1–0	Carlisle United	Harrogate
19:45 BST	Folarin 23'	Report	Edmondson (penalty missed) 76'	Stadium: Wetherby Road; Attendance: 2,177; Referee: Matthew Corlett

=== EFL Trophy ===
In the group stage, Carlisle were drawn into Northern Group C with Accrington Stanley, Harrogate Town and Nottingham Forest U21.

Pos	Div	Team	Pld	W	PW	PL	L	GF	GA	GD	Pts	Qualification
1	L2	Accrington Stanley	3	2	0	0	1	7	5	+2	6	Advance to Round 2
2	ACA	Nottingham Forest U21	3	2	0	0	1	5	3	+2	6	Advance to Round 2
3	L1	Carlisle United	3	1	0	0	2	2	3	−1	3	
4	L2	Harrogate Town	3	1	0	0	2	5	8	−3	3	

Updated to match(es) played on 14 November 2023. Source: EFL.com

Win Draw Loss Fixtures

5 September 2023 Group stage	Accrington Stanley	1–0	Carlisle United	Accrington
19:45 BST				Stadium: Crown Ground

10 October 2023 Group stage	Carlisle United	0–2	Nottingham Forest U21	Carlisle
19:00 BST	Robinson (yellow card) 85'; Butterworth (yellow card) 86'; Plange (yellow card) 90+7'	Report	Powell 69'; Perry 77'; McAdam (yellow card) 90+7'	Stadium: Brunton Park; Attendance: 1,268; Referee: Thomas Kirk

14 November 2023 Group stage	Carlisle United	2–0	Harrogate Town	Carlisle
19:00 GMT	Gibson 3', 79'; Garner (yellow card) 42'	Report		Stadium: Brunton Park; Attendance: 716; Referee: Dale Baines
