= Ryan Doble =

Welsh footballer

Personal information
- Full name: Ryan Alan Doble
- Date of birth: 1 February 1991 (age 35)
- Place of birth: Blaenavon, Wales
- Height: 1.91 m (6 ft 3 in)
- Position: Striker

Youth career
- 1999–2008: Southampton

Senior career*
Years	Team	Apps	(Gls)
2008–2012	Southampton	0	(0)
2011	→ Stockport County (loan)	3	(1)
2011	→ Oxford United (loan)	3	(0)
2011	→ Bournemouth (loan)	7	(0)
2012	→ Bury (loan)	5	(0)
2012–2013	Shrewsbury Town	5	(0)
Total		23	(1)

International career
2006–2007	Wales U17	3	(0)
2008–2009	Wales U19	3	(0)
2010–2012	Wales U21	10	(1)
- * Club domestic league appearances and goals

Ryan Doble (born 1 February 1991) is a Welsh former under-21 international footballer who played as a striker. He last played for Shrewsbury Town in 2013.

== Club career ==
=== Southampton ===
Born in Blaenavon, he joined the Southampton F.C. Academy at the age of 12.

Having completed a scholarship at Southampton, Doble played in a number of pre-season fixtures. He also played a significant role in the F.A youth cup run during the 2008–09 campaign, scoring six goals, one of them coming against Derby County in the later stages of the competition.

On his 17th birthday. Doble signed his first professional contract which was for an original three years. On 16 February 2011, he signed a new professional contract keeping him at the club until 2012.

In the 2010–11 season, Doble appeared on the substitutes bench in Southampton's league campaign but was not used. He made his only first-team appearance for the club in an FA Cup game against Coventry City on 7 January 2012 where he played for 59 minutes before being replaced by Sam Hoskins. On 19 May, it was announced that he was to be released at the end of his contract.

==== Loan to Stockport County ====
On 17 February 2011, Doble joined Stockport County on loan for one month. He made his debut on 19 February in a 4–1 defeat by Macclesfield Town.

In his second appearance on 26 February, he scored County's second goal at Bradford City before being sent off in the 64th minute, following a challenge on Luke Oliver; with Adam Griffin having already been sent off, nine-man County were unable to hang on to their lead and lost 3–2. After making three appearances for Stockport, Doble returned to his parent club.

==== Other loans ====
On 22 March 2011 it was announced that Doble would join Oxford United on loan until the end of the season. On 2 April, Doble made his debut for club, coming on as a substitute for Tom Craddock on a 58 minutes. He returned to Southampton early due to injury after making three appearances.

On 11 August 2011, he joined Bournemouth on a month's loan; which was later extended by a further month; however this loan was also cut short by injury having made seven appearances for the club. Two days later after signing for Bournemouth, Doble made his debut for club in a 2–0 win over Sheffield Wednesday.

On 17 January 2012, he joined League One side Bury on a month-long loan. He made his debut for the club in a 1–1 draw against Charlton Athletic where he provided an assist for Lenell John-Lewis. On 20 February 2012, Doble returned to his parent club, just two days after he made his last appearance for Bury in a 3–2 defeat by Exeter City, after his one-month spell at Bury where he made five appearances and failed to find the net.

=== Shrewsbury Town ===
On 20 June 2012, he joined League One side Shrewsbury Town., but was released after just one season having only made one start and four substitute appearances. Shrewsbury manager Graham Turner said on Doble's release, "He worked hard and he can look at it, I think, and say that he had very few opportunities but you've got to earn those opportunities and I didn't feel he had done enough to warrant a run in the first team.".

Doble went on trial at League Two newcomers Newport County in July 2013, but turned down the offer of a month-to-month contract.

== International career ==
In 2006, he was called up to the Wales U17 squad going on to make three appearances. A year later he was promoted to the U19 squad yet again going on to make three appearances. On 23 August 2010, Doble was called up to the Wales U21 side in hope to boost their chance to qualify for the UEFA U21 European championships.

He was then celebrating his first call up to the Wales senior squad. The 20-year-old had been drafted in for the Euro 2012 qualifying matches against Bulgaria and Switzerland. Doble was brought in as cover by caretaker manager Brian Flynn, after strikers Robert Earnshaw and Craig Bellamy pulled out through injury.
