= Jake Simpson =

English footballer (born 1990)

Personal information
- Full name: Jacob David Simpson
- Date of birth: 27 October 1990 (age 36)
- Place of birth: Oxford, England
- Height: 5 ft 11 in (1.80 m)
- Position: Midfielder

Youth career
- –2009: Blackburn Rovers

Senior career*
Years	Team	Apps	(Gls)
2009–2010	Shrewsbury Town	18	(0)
2010–2011	Stockport County	19	(0)
2011	→ Hyde (loan)	5	(0)
2011–2012	Workington	32	(4)
2012–2013	Lancaster City	13	(1)
2013–2014	Celtic Nation		
2014–2017	Workington		
Total		87	(5)
- * Club domestic league appearances and goals

Jacob David Simpson (born 27 October 1990) is an English former footballer who played for Shrewsbury Town in the Football League. Having played in the youth teams for Blackburn Rovers, he moved to Shrewsbury Town, where his father Paul was manager. Before the 2010–11 season, Simpson followed his father again, to Stockport County.

== Early life ==
Born in Oxford, Simpson is the son of former Manchester City footballer Paul Simpson.

His uncle Peter, is the former manager of Carlisle City and his cousin Josh plays for Gretna 2008.

== Playing career ==
=== Shrewsbury Town ===
Simpson started in the Blackburn Rovers academy, but wasn't offered a professional contract by Rovers, and joined Shrewsbury Town on a one-year deal. He made his debut on the opening day of the 2009–10 season, coming on as a substitute in the Shrews' 3–1 win over Burton Albion. He made a total of 20 appearances over the course of the season, winning the club's young player of the year award. Following his father's sacking as manager, he was released on 14 May 2010.

=== Stockport County ===
After trialling with Carlisle United, Morecambe, Wrexham and Tranmere Rovers in pre-season, on 3 September 2010 he signed Stockport County. He made his debut in the Cheshire derby in a 2–0 win over Macclesfield Town, he then received his first red card in a 5–0 loss to Morecambe. In May 2011 he was informed that he would not be offered a contract by the club for the 2011–12 season.

==== Hyde loan ====
On 30 March 2011, he joined Hyde on a month's loan deal. He made his debut for the club on the same day as a substitute as his new club lost to Eastwood Town. His first start for the club came on the last day of the 2010–11 season in a 2–1 win over Corby Town, which kept Hyde's place in the Conference North.

=== Workington ===
In August 2011, he signed for Conference North side Workington, making his debut as a substitute in a 2–1 defeat to Boston United on the opening day of the 2011–12 season. He scored his first goal for Workington against Stalybridge Celtic on 23 August 2011.

=== Lancaster City ===
In November 2012, Simpson signed for Northern Premier League Division One North side Lancaster City, making his debut on 17 November in a 2–1 home win over Harrogate Railway Athletic.

=== Celtic Nation ===
In pre-season 2013, Simpson joined Carlisle side Celtic Nation in Northern League Division One.

After the financial support was withdrawn at Nation, Simpson and most of the squad left.

=== Workington return ===
In the summer of 2014, he returned to Workington, where he was an ever present player.

== Coaching career ==
In October 2017, Simpson was appointed as Strength & Conditioning Coach at Chesterfield having spent the previous 18 months working as a Fitness Coach at Carlisle.

At the start of the 2018/19 season, Simpson left Chesterfield to become the Lead Strength & Conditioning Coach at AFC Fylde. Simpson moved to Hartlepool United in August 2020 to become the club's Head of Sports Science to join up with Dave Challinor who was his manager at Fylde. Simpson moved to Stockport County in February 2022 to become the club's Head of Performance and again join up with Dave Challinor for the third time.

== Career statistics ==
As of end of 2012–13 season

Appearances and goals by club, season and competition
Club	Season	League			FA Cup		Other		Total	
Club	Season	Division	Apps	Goals	Apps	Goals	Apps	Goals	Apps	Goals
Shrewsbury Town	2009–10	League Two	18	0	1	0	1 (Note: Appearance(s) in Football League Trophy)	0	20	0
Stockport County	2010–11	League Two	19	0	1	0	1	0	21	0
Hyde (loan)	2010–11	Conference North	5	0	—		—		5	0
Workington	2011–12	Conference North	27	4	0	0	0	0	27	4
Workington	2012–13	Conference North	5	0	0	0	0	0	5	0
Workington	Total		32	4	0	0	0	0	32	4
Lancaster City	2012–13	Northern Premier League Division One North	13	1	—		1 (Note: Appearance(s) in Northern Premier League Challenge Cup)	0	14	1
Career total			87	5	2	0	3	0	92	5
