= Max Kilsby =

English footballer

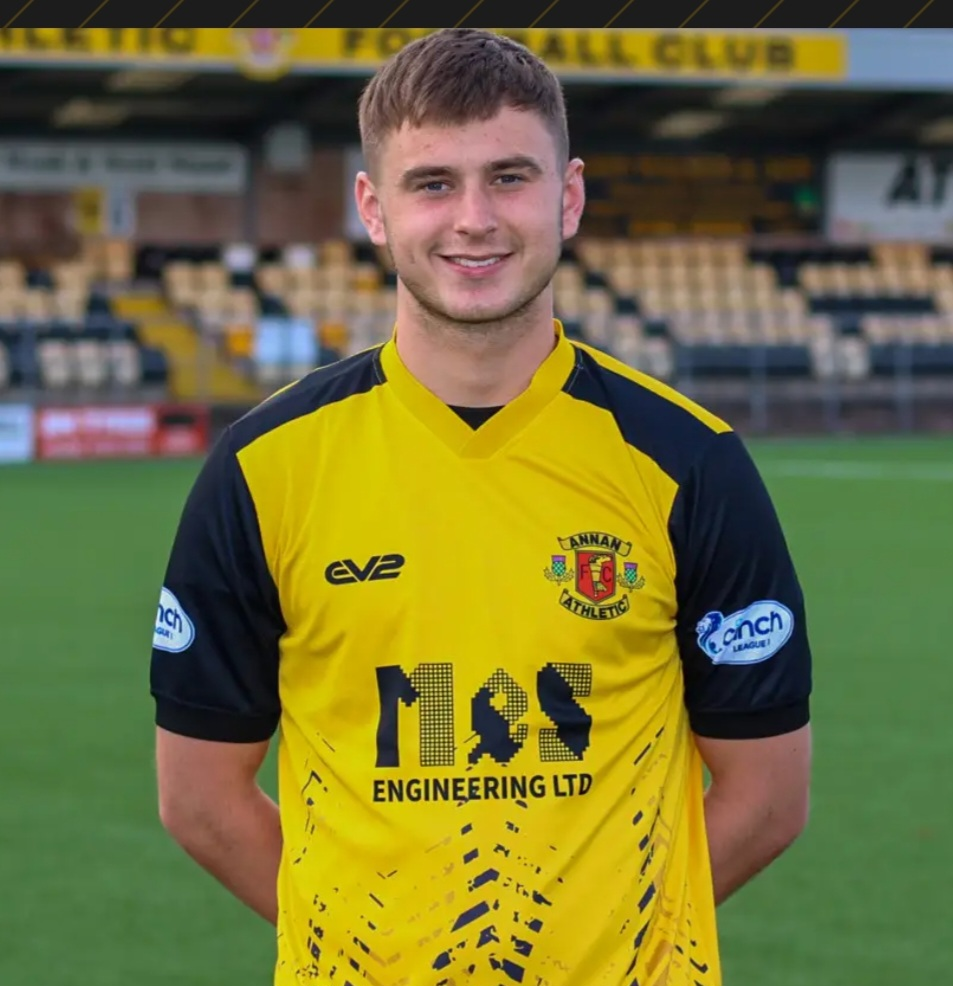
- Kilsby after signing on loan for Annan Athletic in August 2023

Personal information
- Full name: Max Robert Kilsby
- Date of birth: 4 October 2003 (age 23)
- Place of birth: North Shields, England
- Position: Defender

Team information
- Current team: Darlington
- Number: 6

Youth career
- Cramlington Juniors
- 2011–2018: Newcastle United
- 2018–2022: Carlisle United

Senior career*
Years	Team	Apps	(Gls)
2022–2024	Carlisle United	0	(0)
2022–2023	→ Annan Athletic (loan)	31	(4)
2023	→ Annan Athletic (loan)	19	(0)
2024	→ Queen of the South (loan)	10	(0)
2024–	Annan Athletic	53	(3)
2026–	Darlington	7	(1)
- * Club domestic league appearances and goals as of 15 November 2026 at 12:21 (UTC)

Max Kilsby (born 4 October 2003) is an English professional footballer who plays as a defender for National League North club Darlington.

== Playing career ==
=== Carlisle United ===
Kilsby came through the youth-team at Carlisle United and in May 2022 signed his first professional contract.

=== Annan Athletic loan ===
In July 2022 he joined Annan Athletic on loan until January 2023. This Loan was extended in January 2023 until the end of the 2022/23 season. Kilsby scored his first goal for Annan Athletic on 23 December 2022, scoring the 4th goal in a 5–1 win at home to Albion Rovers. On 21 January 2023 he scored his second goal for Annan Athletic in a 4–0 win against Bonnyrigg Rose and scored again a week later in a 3–0 win against East Fife F.C. On 29 April 2023, Kilsby was named the Annan Athletic 'Young Player of the Year' for the 2022–23 season. On 9 May 2023 Kilsby scored the 2nd goal in a 6–0 home win against Dumbarton FC, his 5th goal, in the league one semi-final first leg play off. He scored his first professional brace in a 3–1 home win against Clyde F.C. in the first leg of the 2022/23 Scottish League One Play Off final and was named the BBC Alba man of the match, played on 16 May 2023. He concluded his loan with Annan, playing a full 90 minutes in the 2nd leg of the Play Off final, helping Annan win 5–2 on aggregate and gain promotion for the first time in their history, to League One.

=== Back to Carlisle ===
At the end of the season Carlisle United triggered the clause to extend Kilsby's contract for the 2023/24 season.

=== Rejoining Annan on loan ===
In August 2023 he rejoined Annan Athletic on loan until January 2024. On 6 January 2024 after his final on loan game for Annan Athletic against Montrose FC and a successful season and a half loan, where he had become a regular starter for Annan Athletic in Scottish League One, playing 60 games and scoring 8 goals, he was recalled to his parent club.

=== Queen of the South ===
On 1 February 2024, Kilsby joined Queen of the South on loan for the remainder of the 2023–24 season.

=== Signing permanently for Annan ===
On 29 April 2024 Carlisle announced the player had been released. Kilsby signed for Annan Athletic on the 11th July 2024. In the opening Scottish League One match, 2024/25, against Cove Rangers on the 3rd August, Kilsby scored the opening goal in a 3 1 away win for Annan Athletic. On the 29th of March 2025 Kilsby marked his 100th professional appearance by scoring once and assisting the winning goal in a 2 1 victory over Kelty Hearts. He was named the 'Alba Travel' Man of the Match and named in the SPFL Team of the Week (Week 33)

=== Darlington ===
On 18 June 2026, Kilsby signed for National League North club Darlington on a one year deal. On 25 June 2026 Annan Athletic Chairman, Russell Brown, said: “Max will always have a special place in this club’s history. Those two goals against Clyde were incredible moments which helped to take us into League One for the first time, and that’s something he’ll be remembered for at Galabank for years to come. On behalf of everyone at the Club, I want to thank Max for his commitment and wish him every success at Darlington.” On the 10th of November 2026 Kilsby marked his 150th professional appearance by scoring the equalising goal in a 1 1 draw at home to Oxford City.

== Style of play ==
Carlisle United manager Paul Simpson, said of Kilsby 'He's left-sided, which are hard to find, he can play left wing-back, left centre-back, possibly even go into midfield, so he gives us a few options' Annan Athletic Manager, Peter Murphy, stated 'Max is a real prospect in the Carlisle United ranks and we are delighted to welcome him to Annan Athletic' In February 2023 Peter Murphy stated that 'Max is making excellent progress' Paul Simpson in May 2023 said 'It's been a brilliant loan for him' In August 2023 Carlisle boss Paul Simpson told the club website: 'Murph was keen to have him back after the success they enjoyed last year. We're delighted with how he's developing and more than happy for him to go back up there to continue that good work. We'll monitor his progress and review it in January.' Annan said they were 'delighted' to have Kilsby back. On 1 February 2024, after signing on loan for Queen of the South, manager Marvin Bartley said of Kilsby; 'Max is young but is highly rated and has been very impressive at both ends of the park during his time at Annan and played a huge part in them achieving promotion. He is predominately a defender but can play in various different positions which is a real benefit to us. Carlisle sent him out on loan to help with his development and have been delighted with his progress. I am looking forward to working with him and hope we can continue building his career in a full-time environment'. Annan manager, Wullie Gibson, commenting on his move back to Annan said, 'I'm looking forward to working with Max again. He's got good attributes, knows the club well and had a good spell with us last time round. He's still a young lad where confidence is a big thing and hopefully he'll get that from the way myself and my staff work'.

== Statistics ==
As of 15 Nov 2026

Appearances and goals by club, season and competition
Club	Season	League			National Cup		League Cup		Other		Total	
Club	Season	Division	Apps	Goals	Apps	Goals	Apps	Goals	Apps	Goals	Apps	Goals
Carlisle United	2022–23	League 2	0	0	—		—		—		0	0
Carlisle United	2023–24	League 1	0	0	—		—		—		0	0
Annan Athletic(on loan)	2022–23	Scottish League 2	31	4	0	0	1	0	6 (Note: Appearance/s in the Scottish Challenge Cup (2) and Scottish League One Play Offs (4), 3 goals in Play Offs)	3	38	7
Annan Athletic(on loan)	2023–24	Scottish League 1	19	0	1	0	0	0	2 (Note: Appearance/s in the Scottish Challenge Cup)	1	22	1
Queen of the South(on loan)	2023–24	Scottish League 1	10	0	0	0	0	0	0	0	10	0
Annan Athletic	2024–25	Scottish League 1	29	2	1	0	3	0	5 (Note: Appearance/s in the Scottish Challenge Cup(2) and Scottish League One Play Offs (3), 1 goal in Play Offs)	1	38	3
Annan Athletic	2025–26	Scottish League 2	24	1	3	0	0	0	7 (Note: Appearance/s in the Scottish Challenge Cup)	0	34	1
Darlington	2026–27	National League North	7	1	1	0	-	-	1 (Note: Appearance/s in the FA Challenge Cup)	0	9	1
Career total			120	8	6	0	4	0	21	5	151	13

== Honours ==
Annan Athletic

- 2022-23 Scottish League One play offs

Individual

- Annan Athletic F.C. Young Player of the Year for season 2022/23
