= Jayden Harris =

English footballer

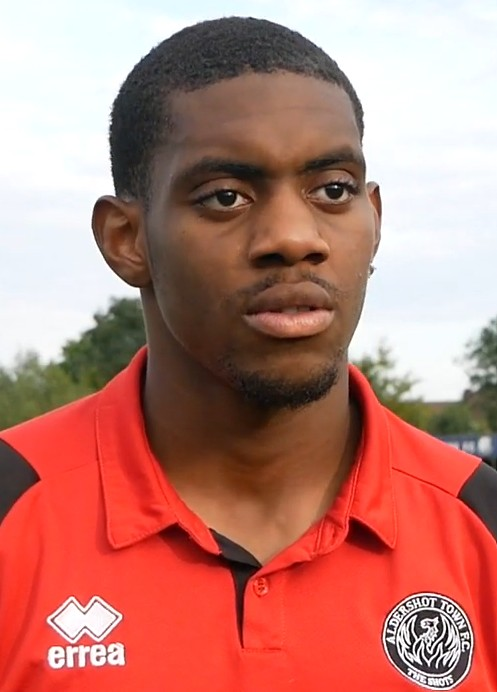
- Harris in September 2021

Personal information
- Full name: Jayden John Lloyd Harris
- Date of birth: 4 September 1999 (age 27)
- Place of birth: Croydon, England
- Height: 6 ft 2 in (1.87 m)
- Position: Midfielder

Team information
- Current team: Wealdstone
- Number: 10

Youth career
- 2009–2021: Fulham

Senior career*
| Years | Team | Apps | (Gls) |
| 2019–2021 | Fulham | 0 | (0) |
| 2020 | → Woking (loan) | 3 | (0) |
| 2021–2022 | Aldershot Town | 33 | (2) |
| 2021 | → Hampton & Richmond Borough (loan) | 2 | (0) |
| 2022–2024 | Carlisle United | 22 | (0) |
| 2023–2024 | → Eastleigh (loan) | 10 | (1) |
| 2024–2026 | Sutton United | 57 | (8) |
| 2026– | Wealdstone | 10 | (0) |
- * Club domestic league appearances and goals as of 21:28, 27 September 2026 (UTC)

Jayden John Lloyd Harris (born 4 September 1999) is an English footballer who plays as a midfielder for National League club Wealdstone.

== Career ==
Harris began his career with Fulham whom he joined at the age of ten, progressing through the ranks to regularly appearing for the Under-23s side before joining National League side Woking on a one-month loan deal in January 2020. At the end of the 2019–20 season, Harris extended his contract with the club for a further year having made 23 appearances for the Under-23s side, scoring three goals. Harris' departure was confirmed in June 2021.

On 24 June 2021, Harris signed for National League club Aldershot Town on a two-year contract. Having found first-team opportunities more limited following a managerial change, Harris joined National League South side Hampton & Richmond Borough on a one-month loan deal in October 2021.

=== Carlisle United ===
On 3 August 2022, Harris signed for EFL League Two club Carlisle United for an undisclosed fee on a three-year contract. Harris scored his first goal for the club on 5 November with the winner in a 2–1 FA Cup first round victory over Tranmere Rovers.

In October 2023, Harris joined National League club Eastleigh on loan until January 2024.

On 3 June 2024, Harris departed Carlisle having had his contract terminated by mutual consent.

=== Sutton United ===
On 4 June 2024, Harris joined recently relegated National League side Sutton United. On 1 May 2026, Sutton announced it would be releasing the player.

=== Wealdstone ===
On 10 July 2026, Harris signed for National League club Wealdstone.

== Career statistics ==
As of 27 September 2026

Appearances and goals by club, season and competition
| Club | Season | League | | | FA Cup | | EFL Cup | | Other | | Total | |
| Club | Season | Division | Apps | Goals | Apps | Goals | Apps | Goals | Apps | Goals | Apps | Goals |
|---|---|---|---|---|---|---|---|---|---|---|---|---|
| Fulham | 2019–20 | Championship | 0 | 0 | 0 | 0 | 0 | 0 | 0 | 0 | 0 | 0 |
| Fulham | 2020–21 | Premier League | 0 | 0 | 0 | 0 | 0 | 0 | — | | 0 | 0 |
| Fulham | Total | | 0 | 0 | 0 | 0 | 0 | 0 | 0 | 0 | 0 | 0 |
| Woking (loan) | 2019–20 | National League | 3 | 0 | — | | — | | — | | 3 | 0 |
| Aldershot Town | 2021–22 | National League | 33 | 2 | 0 | 0 | — | | 2 (Note: Appearances in the FA Trophy) | 0 | 35 | 2 |
| Hampton & Richmond Borough (loan) | 2021–22 | National League South | 2 | 0 | — | | — | | — | | 2 | 0 |
| Carlisle United | 2022–23 | League Two | 18 | 0 | 2 | 1 | 1 | 0 | 3 (Note: Appearances in the EFL Trophy) | 0 | 24 | 1 |
| Carlisle United | 2023–24 | League One | 4 | 0 | 0 | 0 | 0 | 0 | 2 | 0 | 6 | 0 |
| Carlisle United | Total | | 22 | 0 | 2 | 1 | 1 | 0 | 5 | 0 | 30 | 1 |
| Eastleigh (loan) | 2023–24 | National League | 10 | 1 | 4 | 0 | — | | 1 | 1 | 15 | 2 |
| Sutton United | 2024–25 | National League | 16 | 3 | 2 | 0 | 0 | 0 | 0 | 0 | 18 | 3 |
| Sutton United | 2025–26 | National League | 41 | 5 | 4 | 1 | 0 | 0 | 2 (Note: Includes FA Trophy and National League Cup) | 1 | 47 | 7 |
| Sutton United | Total | | 57 | 8 | 6 | 1 | 0 | 0 | 2 | 1 | 65 | 10 |
| Wealdstone | 2026–27 | National League | 10 | 0 | 0 | 0 | — | | 2 (Note: Appearances in National League Cup) | 0 | 12 | 0 |
| Career total | | | 137 | 11 | 12 | 2 | 1 | 0 | 12 | 2 | 162 | 15 |
