= Alan Lord =

Canadian musician, writer, and engineer

Alan Lord is a Canadian musician, writer, and engineer who was a prominent figure in Montreal’s alternative punk music scene.

Lord has been a member of the bands Vex (late 1970s/early1980s), the Marauders (late 1970s/early 1980s), Vent du Mont Scharr (mid 1980s to early 1990s), and Alan Lord & The Falling Men (2008-2012).

In the 1980s, Lord organized Ultimatum Festival, a festival of avant-garde music and poetry at Les Foufounes Électriques. He was featured in Erik Cimon’s documentary, Mtl Punk – The First Wave (2011), which examines the Montreal punk scene from 1977-78. He is a cancer survivor (Lymphomia).

He participated in Dial-A-Poem Montreal 1985-1987.

== Publications ==
=== Prose ===
- ATM Sex. Toronto, ON: Guernica Editions, 2011.
