= Yannick Salem =

Footballer (born 1983)

Personal information
- Full name: Yannick Salem Louniangou
- Date of birth: 29 March 1983 (age 43)
- Place of birth: Amiens, France
- Height: 1.84 m (6 ft 0 in)
- Position: Forward

Youth career
- 1997–2000: Châteauroux

Senior career*
Years	Team	Apps	(Gls)
2000–2001	Châteauroux B		
2001–2003	Créteil		
2003–2005	Grenoble		
2005–2006	De Graafschap	23	(3)
2006–2008	AGOVV Apeldoorn	7	(0)
2008–2009	K.S.K. Beveren	11	(1)
2009–2010	Eintracht Trier	15	(4)
2010–2011	Stockport County	5	(0)
2011	AFC Telford United	5	(2)
2011–2012	Concordia Chiajna	11	(1)
2012–2013	1.FC Wülfrath	19	(8)
2013–2014	Târgu Mures	5	(0)
2014–2015	TuRU Düsseldorf	22	(4)
2016	TSV Meerbusch	1	(0)
2016–2017	Rather SV		
2017–2018	TuRU Düsseldorf		

International career
2009	Congo	2	(0)
- * Club domestic league appearances and goals

Yannick Salem Louniangou (born 29 March 1983) is a former professional footballer who played as a forward. Born in France, he represented Congo at international level.

== Club career ==
The first three clubs that Salem played for were Grenoble, Créteil and Châteauroux. In 2005, he moved to Dutch team De Graafschap before joining AGOVV Apeldoorn in 2006. He went on a trial with Nottingham Forest in August 2007. In 2008 Salem moved to Belgian club K.S.K. Beveren and then the following season to German side Eintracht Trier having agreed a two-year contract until summer 2011.

On 30 October 2010, Salem signed a short-term deal at Stockport County in England.

== International career ==
Salem was called up to the Congo national team on a number of occasions. He made his debut in an African Cup Of Nations qualifier against Zambia in 2007, and has at least a further two caps from friendlies in 2009 against North Korea and Angola. He was also called up for a game against Morocco, but had to withdraw from the squad.

== Personal life ==
Salem was born in Amiens, France to parents from the Republic of the Congo. He has six brothers and three sisters.
