= Adam Griffin =

English footballer (born 1984)

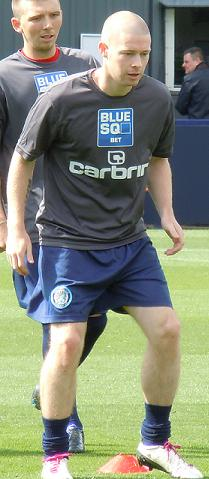
- Griffin training with Hyde in 2011

Personal information
- Date of birth: 26 August 1984 (age 42)
- Place of birth: Salford, England
- Height: 5 ft 7 in (1.70 m)
- Positions: Defender; winger

Youth career
- Oldham Athletic

Senior career*
Years	Team	Apps	(Gls)
2002–2006	Oldham Athletic	62	(3)
2003	→ Chester City (loan)	1	(0)
2005–2006	→ Oxford United (loan)	9	(0)
2006	→ Stockport County (loan)	21	(2)
2006–2008	Stockport County	70	(4)
2008–2009	Darlington	17	(0)
2009–2011	Stockport County	63	(1)
2011–2013	Hyde	92	(4)
2013–2016	Altrincham	71	(1)
Total		406	(15)
- * Club domestic league appearances and goals

Adam Griffin (born 26 August 1984) is an English semi-professional footballer who last played for Ashton United FC.

He started his career at Oldham Athletic, having loan spells with Chester City, Oxford United and Stockport County. After a successful loan at Stockport, he was signed on a permanent basis in 2006. After two seasons with Stockport he was released and subsequently joined Darlington where he stayed for the 2008–09 season before returning to Stockport at the start of 2009–10. After Stockport's relegation from the Football League in 2011, he was released and joined Hyde in August the same year. He signed for Altrincham in December 2013.

== Club career ==
=== Professional ===
Born in Salford, Greater Manchester, Griffin started his career as a trainee with Oldham Athletic, making his debut against Queens Park Rangers on the final day of the 2001–02 season, before joining Football Conference side Chester City in January 2003 for a temporary spell on work experience. He secured a regular place in the Oldham first team in November 2003, making 27 appearances in all competitions in the 2003–04 season, and was rewarded with a new 12-month contract in May 2004. Griffin made a further 46 appearances in the 2004–05 season, then joined Oxford United on loan in November 2005. He returned to Oldham in January 2006 after playing 13 matches during his two-month loan spell, then joined Stockport County on loan until the end of the 2005–06 season, making 21 appearances in the remainder of the season.

Griffin signed a permanent two-year contract with Stockport County in August 2006. Griffin was released from his contract with Stockport after the club was promoted at the end of the 2007–08 season and joined Darlington in July 2008. He rejoined Stockport in July 2009. In May 2011 he was informed that he would not be offered a contract by the club for the 2011–12 season, despite winning Stockport's 'player of the year' award for the 2010–11 season and making 48 appearances.

=== Non-League ===
On 19 August 2011, he signed for Hyde. He made his debut on 22 August 2011, playing as a left-back, as his new side won 4–0 against Hinckley United. He opened his goalscoring account for the club, scoring an injury-time goal in Hyde's 3–2 defeat at FC Halifax Town in October 2011. He scored the winning goal in their 1–0 win against Blyth Spartans in November. He scored his second goal of the month when he scored a free-kick in injury-time as part of a 1–0 win away to Matlock Town in the FA Trophy.

Griffin signed for Altrincham in December 2013, and made 28 appearances for them in the 2013–14 season as they were promoted to the Conference Premier via the Conference North play-offs. He was released prior to the 2016–17 season. He later joined Ashton United although he left the club without making an appearance.

== Honours ==
Stockport County

- Football League Two play-offs: 2007–08

Hyde

- Conference North: 2011–12

Altrincham

- Conference North play-offs: 2013–14
