= Mansour Assoumani =

French footballer (born 1983)

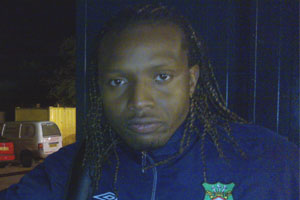

Personal information
- Full name: Mansour Assoumani Gammali
- Date of birth: 30 January 1983 (age 43)
- Place of birth: Nice, France
- Height: 6 ft 2 in (1.88 m)
- Position: Defender

Team information
- Current team: Le Grau-du-Roi

Youth career
- 1998–2001: Montpellier

Senior career*
Years	Team	Apps	(Gls)
2001–2006	Montpellier	74	(4)
2006–2007	1. FC Saarbrücken	34	(1)
2007–2008	Sportfreunde Siegen	27	(3)
2008–2009	Leeds United	1	(0)
2009–2010	Wrexham	40	(1)
2010–2011	Stockport County	36	(1)
2012–2014	JS Saint-Jean Beaulieu		
2014–2015	Le Pontet	14	(2)
2015	Istres	14	(0)
2015–2019	Le Pontet	104	(4)
2019–2020	RC Védasien		
2020–	Le Grau-du-Roi		

International career
2015–2017	County of Nice		
- * Club domestic league appearances and goals

Mansour Assoumani Gammali (born 30 January 1983) is a French footballer who plays as a defender for Régional 1 club Le Grau-du-Roi.

== Career ==
Assoumani began his career in the French First Division with Montpellier on 18 August 2001. He played 72 matches for the club (43 in D1, 29 in D2) and registered four goals (two in D1 and two in D2). (Note: Mansour Assoumani – French league stats at LFP – also available in French (archived)) After five seasons he joined the German club 1. FC Saarbrücken and, subsequently, Sportfreunde Siegen. Prior to joining Leeds United, Assoumani spent time on trial at Sheffield United but failed to impress sufficiently to earn a permanent deal.

=== Leeds United ===
On 17 December 2008, Assoumani was handed a one-month contract with League One team Leeds United after a successful trial which also saw him score a goal in a reserve team game against York City. He made his debut three days later in a 3–1 defeat to Milton Keynes Dons. He played the first half at right-back, but due to the substitution of Ľubomír Michalík at half-time, Assoumani played the second half in his more favoured position of centre-back.

Assoumani was unfortunate that Gary McAllister who signed him was sacked after the game after a run of 5 defeats in a row. Assoumani didn't figure at all under new manager Simon Grayson. He was released on 18 January 2009. On 22 January 2009 he was offered a week-long trial with Crewe Alexandra however he was released without being offered a contract.

=== Wrexham ===
On 26 March 2009, Assoumani joined Conference National side Wrexham, making his debut on 7 April in a 0–0 draw with Histon.

=== Stockport County ===
Assoumani signed for League Two side Stockport County on 2 August 2010. Assoumani scored his first goal for County in their 2–0 win over Macclesfield Town on 4 September 2010.

After making 36 appearances for county, in May 2011 he was informed that he would not be offered a contract by the club for the 2011/12 season.
