= Paul Simpson (footballer) =

English association football player and manager

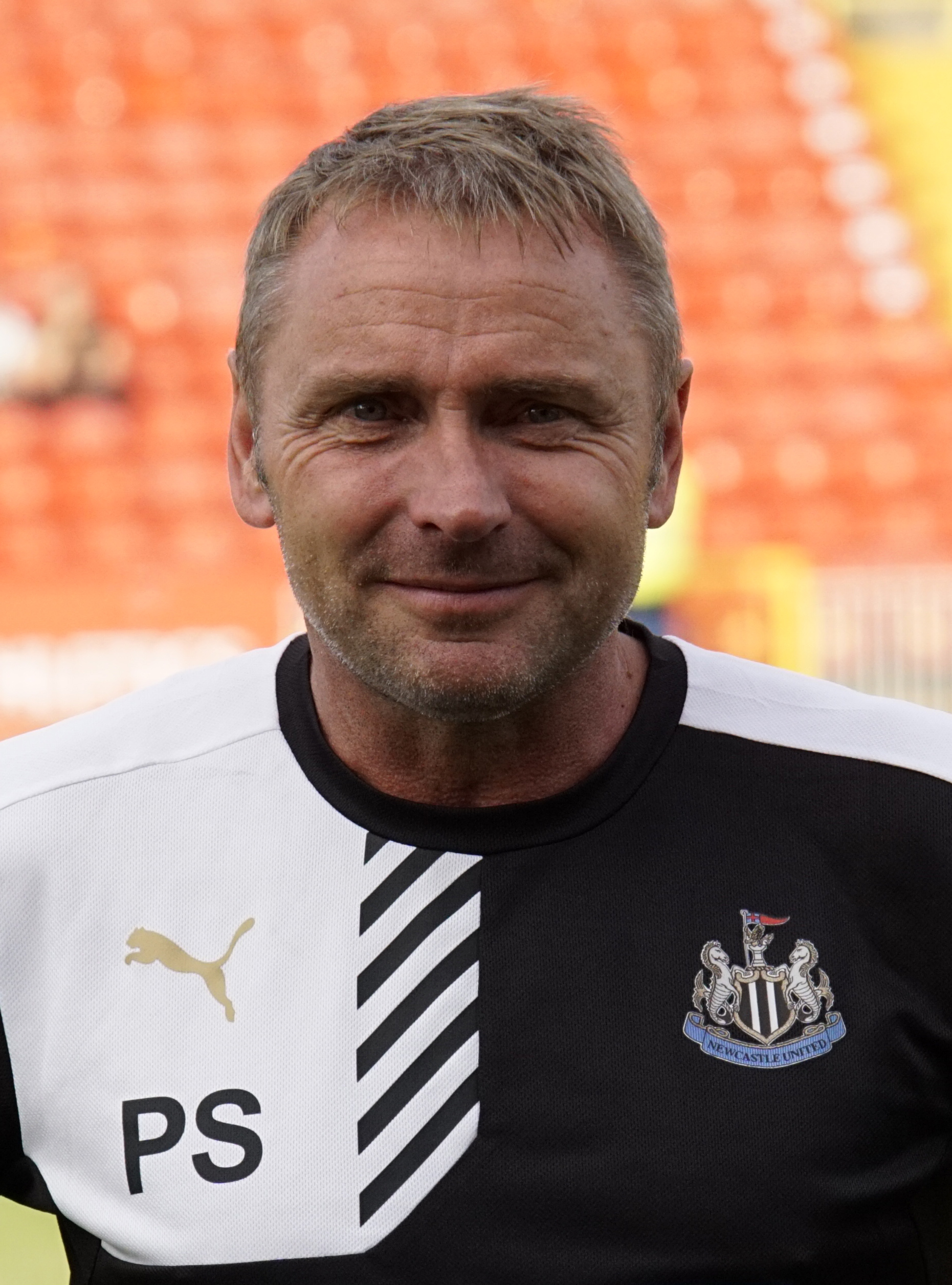
- Simpson with Newcastle United in 2015

Personal information
- Full name: Paul David Simpson
- Date of birth: 26 July 1966 (age 60)
- Place of birth: Carlisle, England
- Position: Winger

Senior career*
Years	Team	Apps	(Gls)
1982–1988	Manchester City	121	(18)
1984–1985	→ Finn Harps (loan)	6	(3)
1988–1992	Oxford United	144	(43)
1992–1997	Derby County	186	(48)
1996	→ Sheffield United (loan)	6	(0)
1997–2000	Wolverhampton Wanderers	52	(6)
1998	→ Walsall (loan)	10	(0)
2000–2002	Blackpool	76	(13)
2002–2003	Rochdale	42	(15)
2003–2006	Carlisle United	36	(6)
Total		679	(150)

International career
1983	England U18	2	(0)
1986–1987	England U21	5	(1)

Managerial career
- 2002–2003: Rochdale
- 2003–2006: Carlisle United
- 2006–2007: Preston North End
- 2008–2010: Shrewsbury Town
- 2010–2011: Stockport County
- 2012: Northwich Victoria
- 2017–2020: England U20
- 2022–2024: Carlisle United
Medal record
Men's football
Representing England (as manager)
FIFA U-20 World Cup
Winner	2017
- * Club domestic league appearances and goals

Paul David Simpson (born 26 July 1966) is an English football manager and former professional player. He has been a coach and manager at several English clubs and was manager of the England team that won the FIFA Under-20s World Cup in South Korea in 2017.

== Playing career ==
=== Manchester City ===
At the age of 15, Simpson moved from Carlisle to Manchester in order to begin his playing career as a schoolboy at Manchester City.

He made his senior debut aged 16, on 2 October 1982 in a 3–2 win against Coventry City, making three senior appearance in total in the 1982/83 season. After the club were relegated and new manager Billy McNeill arrived, Simpson, along with John Beresford, was briefly loaned out to Irish club Finn Harps to gain more experience. He scored 3 goals in 9 total appearances at Finn Park.

He returned during the final stages of 1984–85 campaign and enjoyed a run of games as he scored 6 times in just 10 appearances as City won promotion from the Second Division. He was a regular member of the first team in the 1985–86 season and scored nine First Division goals as City survived their first season back in the top flight, although they were relegated a year later.

He won five caps for the England under-21 team during his spell at Maine Road, adding to three caps at under-18 level. His U21 debut came on 26 March 1986 as a substitute against Denmark on his home ground. He also played in the 1987 Toulon Tournament, during which he scored.

=== Oxford United ===
He left City, now back in the Second Division, for Oxford United in October 1988 in a £200,000 deal, after making 155 appearances for them in total. He remained at Oxford for over four years – all spent in the second tier – before signing for Derby County in February 1992 for £500,000.

=== Derby County ===
The winger joined Derby in the midst of a promotion challenge but, despite finishing third, they lost in the play-offs to sixth-placed Blackburn Rovers. The club had three more successive failed promotion attempts (including losing the 1994 play-off final to rivals Leicester City) before they won automatic promotion in 1995–96. He was a first choice player throughout this period, and twice reached double figures in his goal return.

The influx of new players that followed the Rams' promotion to the Premier League saw his place under fire for the first time since he had joined. He managed 19 appearances (scoring twice, including Derby's first game back at the top level) during their return to the top flight, but also found himself out on loan at second-tier club Sheffield United to gain more playing time.

=== Wolverhampton Wanderers ===
After failing to feature in the opening months of the Rams' 1997–98 season, he dropped down a division to join Wolverhampton Wanderers initially on a month's loan in October 1997. After impressing with 2 goals in 8 starts, he signed a permanent deal for £75,000. His first season with the club also saw him almost appear in an FA Cup Final, but they lost to eventual winners Arsenal in the semi-final.

His second season at Molineux was less successful as he found himself out of the starting line-up in the opening games. He went on loan to nearby Walsall of the Second Division for four months, but returned to Wolves first team when this loan expired. He scored Wolves' final goal of the season in a 3–2 defeat to Bradford City that meant they missed out on the play-offs.

=== Blackpool ===
After a second successive seventh-place finish in a season that saw Simpson feature only sparingly, he signed for Blackpool on a free transfer in August 2000. Here, he helped the club win promotion from the Third Division via the play-offs in his first season but he left during his second, to join Rochdale in March 2002. Just before leaving the club he helped them win the 2001–02 Football League Trophy, playing as a substitute in the final.

=== Rochdale ===
He made nine appearances in the final games of the 2001–02 season for Dale, scoring 6 times. This goal rush helped push the club into the play-offs, where they lost to Rushden & Diamonds (despite another goal from Simpson).

== Managerial career ==
=== Rochdale ===
After manager John Hollins departed from Rochdale in 2002, Simpson stepped in as player-manager. He began the season in equally bright goal-scoring form, but as the pressure of management took its toll and he enjoyed a largely unsuccessful season. Simpson left Rochdale after only season in charge where they reached the FA Cup fifth round, an equal club record, but finished 19th after a late turnaround by Macclesfield saw them drop from 13th in the final 10minutes of the season.

=== Carlisle United ===
Following his departure from Rochdale, Simpson moved back to his home town, where he signed as a player for Carlisle United. Four games into the season manager Roddy Collins was sacked with the club bottom of the table. Simpson was asked to take over as manager. Carlisle were relegated to the Conference in his first year at Brunton Park, at a time when the club was struggling financially. A transfer embargo prevented new players being brought in and by December 2003 Carlisle were 15 points adrift, and despite an improved latter half of the season, the club were eventually relegated. However, he immediately led Carlisle back to League Two in 2004–05 as Conference National play-off winners. Following this, Simpson enjoyed perhaps his best season as a manager, leading Carlisle to double – promotion, winning promotion to League One as League Two champions. He was also named as the League Two Manager of the Year and in the League Managers Association statistics was the best manager in the country on points per game above Rafael Benítez.

Simpson played his final game as a professional player on 6 May 2006 at Edgeley Park against Stockport County, the club he later managed, on a day where the two teams drew 0–0, meaning that Carlisle were promoted as champions. This marked the end of his playing career aged 39, after 24 years.

=== Preston North End ===
In June 2006, following his success at Carlisle, Simpson left the club to replace Billy Davies as manager of Preston North End, where he led the Lancashire side to the top of the Championship by December, their highest league placing for 55 years. However, after only being able to bring 3 free transfers in January they were unable to maintain this position and missed out on the play-offs by goal difference despite beating already promoted Birmingham on the last day. After losing key player David Nugent, the team made a bad start to the 2007–08 season (including just three victories) resulting in Simpson being sacked on 13 November 2007.

=== Shrewsbury Town ===
On 12 March 2008, he was appointed manager of League Two club Shrewsbury Town, replacing Gary Peters who had left the club by mutual consent after a poor run of results. After helping them avoid relegation in his first season, Simpson then took them to the Play-off Final where they lost to a last minute Gillingham goal. In the following campaign after an overall decent first half of the season, Shrewsbury were dealt six straight defeats in March and April, ultimately costing them a place in the play-offs. He was dismissed as manager on 30 April 2010.

=== Stockport County ===
Simpson was confirmed as the new manager of Stockport County on 12 July 2010 following a takeover by The 2015 Group. He replaced former manager Gary Ablett, who was sacked by the club's new owners after the club spent the entire season in administration – with County gaining just 25 points from 46 games.

Simpson was charged with the task of staying in the division and rebuilding a squad which has been ravaged by administration, and ensuring the survival of the club in League Two in the coming season. He was instructed to work with Peter Ward as his assistant manager, and former youth team manager Alan Lord was put in charge of Youth Development. Both Ward and Lord were returning to County having previously worked there under former manager Jim Gannon between 2005 and 2009. Ward was also a former Stockport captain, playing for the club in the 1990s. Simpson also employed former coach Stuart Delaney as Youth Team Manager.

Simpson was sacked on 4 January 2011 after a run of just three wins in 19 games.

=== Northwich Victoria ===
Simpson was appointed manager of Northern Premier League Premier Division side Northwich Victoria on 1 February 2012, with Alan Wright as his assistant. However, he departed after only a month as he had been due to take up a role in Portugal at the end of the season. This was, however, brought forward to March, meaning Simpson left following the club's FA Trophy quarter-final match on 25 February. His assistant, Alan Wright, oversaw a match with Rushall Olympic during Simpson's absence.

=== Derby County ===
In October 2013 Simpson joined Steve McClaren, as assistant manager. The team hit the ground running and went on an amazing run of results. In their first season they took the team to the Championship Play off final, losing to a late goal versus QPR. In the second season they again had a great start, in terms of results, and continued to enjoy success. In the December 2014 rumours started to circulate that McClaren was being headhunted by Newcastle United, in the Premier League. Many blamed these rumours on the team's results taking a dive, but there were other mitigating circumstances. The team missed out on the playoffs and McClaren was sacked at the end of the season. Simpson was sacked at the start of July, on the eve of pre season training under the newly appointed head coach, Paul Clement.

=== Newcastle United ===
On 3 July 2015, Simpson was appointed as one of Steve McClaren's assistant coaches along with Ian Cathro, after leaving Derby County.

=== England U20 ===
Simpson took charge of the England Under 20 Squad in 2017 and won the U20 World Cup in Suwon, South Korea on 11 June 2017, beating Venezuela by the only goal of the game. Simpson left his post on 10 August 2020, to become assistant head coach to Dean Holden at Bristol City.

=== Return to Carlisle United ===
On 23 February 2022, Simpson returned to former club Carlisle United as manager until the end of the 2021–22 season. In similar circumstances to his first spell with the club, the Cumbrian side found themselves in the League Two relegation zone in 23rd position at the time of his appointment. Simpson turned the club's form around and after five wins from seven matches across the month of March, Simpson was nominated for the league's Manager of the Month award, losing out to Bristol Rovers' Joey Barton, a team that Simpson's side had beaten at the end of the month. On 27 April 2022, having confirmed Carlisle's League Two status for the following season, Simpson signed a permanent three-year contract with the club. In the following season, Simpson led Carlisle to a 5th place finish, qualifying for the play-offs. After a win against Bradford City in the semi-final, Carlisle won the 2023 play-off final at Wembley, defeating Stockport County on penalties. This was the first win for Simpson at Wembley in six attempts.

Following a disastrous 2023–24 season that saw Carlisle immediately relegated back to League Two, Simpson was sacked by Carlisle on 31 August 2024 following three defeats in their first four league matches.

=== Jamaica (Assistant Coach) ===
In March 2025, Simpson was named as an assistant with the Jamaica senior national team. Simpson left Jamaica in June 2025 and joined Atlanta academy in August 2025.

== Personal life ==
He completed at degree in Sport Science at Manchester Metropolitan University.

Simpson temporarily stepped down from his coaching role at Bristol City in July 2021 while receiving treatment for kidney cancer.

Paul's son, Dom Simpson, is a professional actor who plays the role of Christian in Moulin Rouge at The Piccadilly Theatre, and has previously played Elder Price in the Book of Mormon at the Prince of Wales Theatre (London's West End). His son Jake Simpson is also a former professional, formerly head of performance at Carlisle United until 31 August 2024.

== Managerial statistics ==
As of 31 August 2024

Managerial record by team and tenure
Team	From	To	Record				
Team	From	To	P	W	D	L	Win %
Rochdale	1 July 2002	30 June 2003	54	16	17	21	29.6
Carlisle United	29 August 2003	30 June 2006	157	70	36	51	44.6
Preston North End	1 July 2006	13 November 2007	67	27	14	26	40.3
Shrewsbury Town	12 March 2008	30 April 2010	111	39	34	38	35.1
Stockport County	1 July 2010	4 January 2011	27	5	9	13	18.5
Northwich Victoria	2 February 2012	25 February 2012	0	0	0	0	—
England U20	24 February 2017	9 August 2020	42	24	5	13	57.1
Bristol City (caretaker)	16 February 2021	23 February 2021	2	1	0	1	50.0
Carlisle United	24 February 2022	31 August 2024	126	39	28	59	31.0
Total			586	221	143	222	37.71

== Honours ==
=== Player ===
Manchester City

- Football League Second Division promotion: 1984–85
- Full Members' Cup runner-up: 1985–86

Derby County

- Football League Second Division runner-up: 1995–96
- Anglo-Italian Cup runner-up: 1992–93

Blackpool

- Football League Fourth Division play-offs: 2001
- Football League Trophy: 2001–02

Carlisle United

- Football League Two: 2005–06
- Conference National play-offs: 2005

Individual

- PFA Team of the Year: 2000–01 Third Division

=== Manager ===
Carlisle United

- Football League Two: 2005–06; play-offs: 2023
- Conference National play-offs: 2005
- Football League Trophy runner-up: 2005–06

England U20

- FIFA U-20 World Cup: 2017

Individual

- Football League Two Manager of the Month: December 2005, March 2006
