= 2018–19 Carlisle United F.C. season =

Carlisle United
2018–19 season
- Chairman: Andrew Jenkins
- Manager: John Sheridan (until 4 January); Tommy Wright (Joint Caretaker) (from 5 January); Paul Murray (Joint Caretaker) (from 5 January); Steven Pressley (from 16 January)
- Stadium: Brunton Park, Carlisle
- League Two: 11th
- FA Cup: Second round (vs. Lincoln City)
- EFL Cup: First round (vs. Blackburn Rovers)
- EFL Trophy: Group stage
- Top goalscorer: League: 14 – Hallam Hope; All: 15 – Hallam Hope
- Highest home attendance: 10,459 vs MK Dons, 16 February 2019
- Lowest home attendance: 882 vs Stoke City U21s, 13 November 2018
- Average home league attendance: League: 4,712; All: 4,370
Home colours	Away colours

The 2018–19 season was Carlisle United's 114th season in their history and their fifth consecutive season in League Two. Along with League Two, the club participated in the FA Cup, EFL Cup and EFL Trophy.

The season covered the period from 1 July 2018 to 30 June 2019.

== Squad statistics ==
As of 4 May 2019

No.	Pos	Nat	Player	Total		League Two		FA Cup		League Cup		EFL Trophy	
No.	Pos	Nat	Player	Apps	Goals	Apps	Goals	Apps	Goals	Apps	Goals	Apps	Goals
1	GK	(England) ENG	Joe Fryer	6	0	5+0	0	0+0	0	1+0	0	0+0	0
2	DF	(Scotland) SCO	Gary Miller	21	1	16+1	1	0+0	0	0+1	0	3+0	0
3	DF	(England) ENG	Danny Grainger	25	5	23+0	5	1+0	0	0+0	0	1+0	0
4	DF	(England) ENG	Gary Liddle	45	1	38+1	1	2+0	0	1+0	0	3+0	0
5	DF	(Ireland) EIR	Anthony Gerrard	43	0	40+0	0	2+0	0	1+0	0	0+0	0
6	DF	(England) ENG	Tom Parkes	42	1	37+2	1	0+0	0	1+0	0	2+0	0
7	MF	(England) ENG	Jason Kennedy	7	0	1+6	0	0+0	0	0+0	0	0+0	0
8	MF	(England) ENG	Mike Jones	28	1	19+5	1	2+0	0	0+0	0	0+2	0
9	FW	(England) ENG	Hallam Hope	43	15	38+1	14	2+0	0	1+0	1	1+0	0
10	MF	(Ireland) EIR	Jamie Devitt	39	12	32+4	11	1+0	1	1+0	0	1+0	0
11	MF	(England) ENG	George Glendon	19	1	5+11	0	0+0	0	0+0	0	3+0	1
12	DF	(England) ENG	Macaulay Gillesphey	30	1	20+4	0	2+0	0	1+0	0	3+0	1
13	FW	(England) ENG	Mark Cullen	9	0	3+6	0	0+0	0	0+0	0	0+0	0
14	FW	(England) ENG	Richie Bennett (out on loan)	26	4	13+8	4	2+0	0	0+1	0	1+1	0
15	MF	(England) ENG	Regan Slater	39	2	24+10	2	2+0	0	1+0	0	2+0	0
16	MF	(England) ENG	Adam Campbell (loan completed)	17	0	2+11	0	0+2	0	1+0	0	1+0	0
16	MF	(England) ENG	Nathan Thomas	16	4	11+5	4	0+0	0	0+0	0	0+0	0
17	FW	(England) ENG	Jerry Yates (loan completed)	29	6	23+0	6	2+0	0	1+0	0	3+0	0
17	MF	(England) ENG	Callum O'Hare	16	3	16+0	3	0+0	0	0+0	0	0+0	0
18	MF	(England) ENG	Jack Sowerby (loan completed)	27	5	21+3	4	1+1	0	0+0	0	1+0	1
18	DF	(Scotland) SCO	Peter Grant	4	0	4+0	0	0+0	0	0+0	0	0+0	0
19	FW	(England) ENG	Connor Simpson	8	1	1+7	1	0+0	0	0+0	0	0+0	0
20	DF	(England) ENG	Kieron Olsen (free agent)	0	0	0+0	0	0+0	0	0+0	0	0+0	0
21	MF	(Nigeria) NGA	Kelvin Etuhu	41	0	34+5	0	1+0	0	1+0	0	0+0	0
22	FW	(England) ENG	Max Brown (free agent)	1	0	0+1	0	0+0	0	0+0	0	0+0	0
22	MF	(Scotland) SCO	Stefan Scougall	15	1	10+5	1	0+0	0	0+0	0	0+0	0
23	FW	(England) ENG	Ashley Nadesan (loan completed)	28	9	23+2	8	0+0	0	0+0	0	3+0	1
24	MF	(England) ENG	Sam Adewusi (free agent)	2	0	0+1	0	0+0	0	0+0	0	0+1	0
25	MF	(England) ENG	Jordan Holt (free agent)	0	0	0+0	0	0+0	0	0+0	0	0+0	0
25	FW	(France) FRA	Arthur Gnahoua	1	0	0+1	0	0+0	0	0+0	0	0+0	0
26	MF	(England) ENG	Jack Egan (free agent)	1	0	0+0	0	0+0	0	0+0	0	0+1	0
27	FW	(England) ENG	Liam McCarron	20	0	3+13	0	0+1	0	0+0	0	1+2	0
28	DF	(England) ENG	Charlie Birch	0	0	0+0	0	0+0	0	0+0	0	0+0	0
29	GK	(England) ENG	Louis Gray	0	0	0+0	0	0+0	0	0+0	0	0+0	0
30	GK	(England) ENG	Adam Collin	45	0	40+1	0	2+0	0	0+0	0	2+0	0

=== Top scorers ===
Place	Position	Nation	Number	Name	League Two	FA Cup	League Cup	EFL Trophy	Total
1	FW	(England)	9	Hallam Hope	14	0	1	0	15
2	MF	(Republic of Ireland)	10	Jamie Devitt	11	1	0	0	12
3	FW	(England)	23	Ashley Nadesan	8	0	0	1	9
4	FW	(England)	17	Jerry Yates	6	0	0	1	7
5	DF	(England)	3	Danny Grainger	5	0	0	0	5
5	MF	(England)	18	Jack Sowerby	4	0	0	1	5
7	FW	(England)	14	Richie Bennett	4	0	0	0	4
7	MF	(England)	16	Nathan Thomas	4	0	0	0	4
9	MF	(England)	17	Callum O'Hare	3	0	0	0	3
10	MF	(England)	15	Regan Slater	2	0	0	0	2
11	DF	(England)	12	Macaulay Gillesphey	0	0	0	1	1
11	MF	(England)	11	George Glendon	0	0	0	1	1
11	MF	(England)	8	Mike Jones	1	0	0	0	1
11	DF	(England)	4	Gary Liddle	1	0	0	0	1
11	DF	(England)	2	Gary Miller	1	0	0	0	1
11	DF	(England)	6	Tom Parkes	1	0	0	0	1
11	FW	(England)	19	Connor Simpson	1	0	0	0	1
11	MF	(Scotland)	22	Stefan Scougall	1	0	0	0	1
Own goals					0	0	0	0	0
				TOTALS	67	1	1	5	74

=== Disciplinary record ===
Position	Nation	Number	Name	League Two		FA Cup		League Cup		JP Trophy		Total	
Position	Nation	Number	Name	Booked	Sent off (straight red)	Booked	Sent off (straight red)	Booked	Sent off (straight red)	Booked	Sent off (straight red)	Booked	Sent off (straight red)
MF	(Republic of Ireland)	10	Jamie Devitt	6	1	1	0	0	0	0	0	7	1
MF	(England)	18	Mike Jones	4	1	0	0	0	0	0	0	4	1
FW	(England)	17	Jerry Yates	2	1	1	0	0	0	0	0	3	1
DF	(Republic of Ireland)	5	Anthony Gerrard	8	0	1	0	0	0	0	0	9	0
MF	(Nigeria)	21	Kelvin Etuhu	6	0	0	0	1	0	0	0	7	0
FW	(England)	9	Hallam Hope	5	0	0	0	0	0	0	0	5	0
DF	(England)	6	Tom Parkes	5	0	0	0	0	0	0	0	5	0
DF	(England)	3	Danny Grainger	4	0	0	0	0	0	0	0	4	0
DF	(England)	4	Gary Liddle	3	0	0	0	0	0	1	0	4	0
MF	(England)	5	Anthony Gerrard	3	0	0	0	0	0	0	0	3	0
MF	(England)	16	Nathan Thomas	3	0	0	0	0	0	0	0	3	0
FW	(England)	14	Richie Bennett	1	0	1	0	0	0	0	0	2	0
MF	(England)	13	Mark Cullen	2	0	0	0	0	0	0	0	2	0
DF	(England)	12	Macaulay Gillesphey	2	0	0	0	0	0	0	0	2	0
MF	(England)	16	Adam Campbell	1	0	0	0	0	0	0	0	1	0
DF	(England)	11	George Glendon	1	0	0	0	0	0	0	0	1	0
MF	(England)	17	Callum O'Hare	1	0	0	0	0	0	0	0	1	0
MF	(England)	15	Regan Slater	1	0	0	0	0	0	0	0	1	0
MF	(England)	18	Jack Sowerby	1	0	0	0	0	0	0	0	1	0
			TOTALS	59	3	4	0	1	0	1	0	65	3

== Competitions ==
=== Pre-season friendlies ===
The Cumbrians confirmed friendlies against Barrow, Penrith, Kendal Town, AFC Fylde, Workington and Bradford City. The friendly against Kendal Town was later cancelled because of fears about player safety in the hot weather.

10 July 2018 Friendly	Barrow	3–1	Carlisle United	Barrow-in-Furness
19:45 BST	Trialist 30'; Hindle 49', 83'	Report	Bennett 80'	Stadium: Holker Street; Attendance: 321

14 July 2018 Friendly	Penrith	0–2	Carlisle United	Penrith
15:00 BST		Report	Stockton 35'; Brown 69'	Stadium: Frenchfield Park

21 July 2018 Friendly	AFC Fylde	0–1	Carlisle United	Medlar-with-Wesham
15:00 BST		Report	Hope 87'	Stadium: Mill Farm; Referee: Paul Marsden

24 July 2018 Friendly	Workington	1–3	Carlisle United	Workington
19:45 BST	Maguire 80'	Report	Devitt 24'; Yates 36'; Bennett 61'	Stadium: Borough Park; Attendance: 678; Referee: Anthony Backhouse

28 July 2018 Friendly	Carlisle United	1–0	Bradford City	Carlisle
15:00 BST	Bennett 90'	Report		Stadium: Brunton Park; Attendance: 792; Referee: Anthony Backhouse

=== League Two ===
==== League table ====
Pos	Team	Pld	W	D	L	GF	GA	GD	Pts
9	Exeter City	46	19	13	14	60	49	+11	70
10	Stevenage	46	20	10	16	59	55	+4	70
11	Carlisle United	46	20	8	18	67	62	+5	68
12	Crewe Alexandra	46	19	8	19	60	59	+1	65
13	Swindon Town	46	16	16	14	59	56	+3	64

Source: EFL Official Website
Rules for classification: 1) Points; 2) Goal difference; 3) Number of goals scored; 4) Head-to-head results

==== Results summary ====
Overall								Home						Away					
Pld	W	D	L	GF	GA	GD	Pts	W	D	L	GF	GA	GD	W	D	L	GF	GA	GD
46	20	8	18	67	62	+5	68	12	3	8	42	31	+11	8	5	10	25	31	−6

Last updated: 4 May 2019.
Source: BBC

==== Results by matchday ====
Matchday	1	2	3	4	5	6	7	8	9	10	11	12	13	14	15	16	17	18	19	20	21	22	23	24	25	26	27	28	29	30	31	32	33	34	35	36	37	38	39	40	41	42	43	44	45	46
Ground	A	H	A	H	H	A	A	H	A	H	H	A	H	A	A	H	H	A	H	A	A	H	A	H	H	A	H	A	H	A	H	A	H	A	A	H	H	A	H	A	H	A	H	A	H	A
Result	L	D	W	W	W	L	W	L	W	L	L	W	L	L	D	L	W	W	L	D	L	W	W	W	W	W	W	L	W	W	D	L	L	D	L	W	L	D	D	L	W	L	W	L	W	D
Position	20	21	15	6	4	10	4	11	5	11	13	10	11	11	13	16	11	11	11	11	13	12	10	9	8	7	5	6	4	4	5	6	7	8	9	7	8	9	8	9	8	8	8	9	9	11

Updated to match(es) played on 4 May 2019. Source: Statto.com
A = Away; H = Home; W = Win; D = Draw; L = Loss

==== Matches ====
On 21 June 2018, the League Two fixtures for the forthcoming season were announced.

4 August 2018 1	Exeter City	3–1	Carlisle United	Exeter
15:00 BST	Law 16'; Forte 26'; Abrahams 90+3'	Report	Bennett 37'	Stadium: St James Park; Attendance: 4,266; Referee: Graham Salisbury

11 August 2018 2	Carlisle United	2–2	Northampton Town	Carlisle
15:00 BST	Devitt 30'; Hope 63'	Report	van Veen 40'; Crooks 62'	Stadium: Brunton Park; Attendance: 4,521; Referee: Tom Nield

18 August 2018 3	Cheltenham Town	0–1	Carlisle United	Cheltenham
15:00 BST		Report	Bennett 39'	Stadium: Whaddon Road; Attendance: 2,455; Referee: Peter Wright

21 August 2018 4	Carlisle United	2–1	Port Vale	Carlisle
19:45 BST	Grainger 30' (pen.); Parkes 84'	Report	Hannant 88'	Stadium: Brunton Park; Attendance: 3,688; Referee: Ben Toner

25 August 2018 5	Carlisle United	1–0	Crewe Alexandra	Carlisle
15:00 BST	Nadesan 69'	Report		Stadium: Brunton Park; Attendance: 4,238; Referee: Seb Stockbridge

1 September 2018 6	Mansfield Town	1–0	Carlisle United	Mansfield
15:00 BST	Walker 55' (pen.)	Report		Stadium: Field Mill; Attendance: 4,470; Referee: Darren Drysdale

8 September 2018 7	Cambridge United	1–2	Carlisle United	Cambridge
15:00 BST	Brown 23'	Report	Bennett 43'; Nadesan 69'	Stadium: Abbey Stadium; Attendance: 4,234; Referee: Ollie Yates

15 September 2018 8	Carlisle United	0–2	Tranmere Rovers	Carlisle
15:00 BST		Report	Parkes 80' (o.g.); Mullin 86'	Stadium: Brunton Park; Attendance: 5,187; Referee: Matt Donohue

22 September 2018 9	Bury	0–1	Carlisle United	Bury
15:00 BST		Report	Bennett 52'	Stadium: Gigg Lane; Attendance: 3,657; Referee: Mark Heywood

29 September 2018 10	Carlisle United	0–1	Stevenage	Carlisle
15:00 BST		Report	Kennedy 56'	Stadium: Brunton Park; Attendance: 4,200; Referee: Scott Oldham

2 October 2018 11	Carlisle United	0–1	Grimsby Town	Carlisle
19:45 BST		Report	Hendrie 38'	Stadium: Brunton Park; Attendance: 3,316; Referee: Martin Coy

6 October 2018 12	Oldham Athletic	1–3	Carlisle United	Oldham
15:00 BST	Miller 69'	Report	Hope 21'; Nadesan 56'; Sowerby 57'	Stadium: Boundary Park; Attendance: 4,730; Referee: Dean Whitestone

13 October 2018 13	Carlisle United	0–2	Morecambe	Carlisle
15:00 BST		Report	Leitch-Smith 14'; Oliver 26'	Stadium: Brunton Park; Attendance: 4,569; Referee: Seb Stockbridge

20 October 2018 14	Macclesfield Town	2–1	Carlisle United	Macclesfield
15:00 BST	Rose 79' (pen.); Vincenti 83'	Report	Nadesan 50'	Stadium: Moss Rose; Attendance: 2,153; Referee: Michael Salisbury

23 October 2018 15	Lincoln City	2–2	Carlisle United	Lincoln
19:45 BST	O'Connor 13'; Andrade 44'	Report	Nadesan 6', 27'	Stadium: Sincil Bank; Attendance: 9,119; Referee: Neil Hair

27 October 2018 16	Carlisle United	0–1	Yeovil Town	Carlisle
15:00 BST		Report	James 90+6'	Stadium: Brunton Park; Attendance: 3,928; Referee: Thomas Bramall

3 November 2018 17	Carlisle United	3–2	Newport County	Carlisle
15:00 GMT	Devitt 9', 12'; Grainger 90+2'	Report	Amond 39'; Butler 87'	Stadium: Brunton Park; Attendance: 3,541; Referee: Chris Sarginson

17 November 2018 18	Swindon Town	0–4	Carlisle United	Swindon
15:00 GMT		Report	Nadesan 41'; Slater 46', 65'; Devitt 54'	Stadium: County Ground; Attendance: 6,722; Referee: Graham Salisbury

24 November 2018 19	Carlisle United	1–2	Forest Green Rovers	Carlisle
15:00 GMT	Devitt 77' (pen.)	Report	Morris 12'; Winchester 71'	Stadium: Brunton Park; Attendance: 4,166; Referee: Carl Boyeson

27 November 2018 20	Notts County	1–1	Carlisle United	Nottingham
19:45 GMT	Hewitt 63'	Report	Yates 84'	Stadium: Meadow Lane; Attendance: 4,119; Referee: Thomas Bramall

8 December 2018 21	Milton Keynes Dons	2–0	Carlisle United	Milton Keynes
15:00 GMT	Houghton 50'; Agard 65'	Report		Stadium: Stadium MK; Attendance: 6,849; Referee: Scott Oldham

15 December 2018 22	Carlisle United	4–0	Colchester United	Carlisle
15:00 GMT	Hope 33'; Yates 51'; Devitt 57'; Grainger 90+5'	Report		Stadium: Brunton Park; Attendance: 3,547; Referee: Eddie Ilderton

22 December 2018 23	Crawley Town	2–3	Carlisle United	Crawley
15:00 GMT	Poleon 8', 40'	Report	Yates 14'; Grainger 37' (pen.); Sowerby 56'	Stadium: Broadfield Stadium; Attendance: 2,176; Referee: Nick Kinseley

26 December 2018 24	Carlisle United	6–0	Oldham Athletic	Carlisle
15:00 GMT	Hope 18'; Yates 30', 71'; Nadesan 60'; Grainger 64'; Liddle 90+3'	Report		Stadium: Brunton Park; Attendance: 5,465; Referee: Andy Haines

29 December 2018 25	Carlisle United	2–1	Macclesfield Town	Carlisle
15:00 GMT	Hope 44'; Yates 88'	Report	Wilson 2'	Stadium: Brunton Park; Attendance: 4,884; Referee: Ross Joyce

1 January 2019 26	Morecambe	0–2	Carlisle United	Morecambe
15:00 GMT		Report	Devitt 15'; Sowerby 76'	Stadium: Globe Arena; Attendance: 3,749; Referee: Ben Toner

5 January 2019 27	Carlisle United	3–2	Mansfield Town	Carlisle
15:00 GMT	Sowerby 4'; Hope 26', 79'	Report	Preston 77'; Walker 86'	Stadium: Brunton Park; Attendance: 4,563; Referee: Robert Lewis

12 January 2019 28	Northampton Town	3–0	Carlisle United	Northampton
15:00 GMT	Bridge 48', 62'; Morias 72'	Report		Stadium: Sixfields Stadium; Attendance: 4,875; Referee: Lee Swabey

19 January 2019 29	Carlisle United	2–0	Cheltenham Town	Carlisle
15:00 GMT	Devitt 49'; Hope 56'	Report		Stadium: Brunton Park; Attendance: 4,458; Referee: Carl Boyeson

26 January 2019 30	Port Vale	0–1	Carlisle United	Burslem
15:00 GMT		Report	Simpson 79'	Stadium: Vale Park; Attendance: 3,881; Referee: Charles Breakspear

2 February 2019 P^{(1)}	Crewe Alexandra	P–P	Carlisle United	Crewe
15:00 GMT		Report		Stadium: Gresty Road

9 February 2019 31	Carlisle United	1–1	Exeter City	Carlisle
15:00 GMT	Devitt 78'	Report	Law 19'	Stadium: Brunton Park; Attendance: 4,851; Referee: Matt Donohue

12 February 2019 32	Crewe Alexandra	2–1	Carlisle United	Crewe
19:45 GMT	Porter 3'; Miller 73'	Report	Miller 29'	Stadium: Gresty Road; Attendance: 3,476; Referee: Paul Marsden

16 February 2019 33	Carlisle United	2–3	Milton Keynes Dons	Carlisle
15:00 GMT	Scougall 14' (pen.); Hope 90'	Report	McGrandles 11'; Hesketh 69'; Agard 77'	Stadium: Brunton Park; Attendance: 10,459; Referee: Peter Wright

23 February 2019 34	Colchester United	1–1	Carlisle United	Colchester
15:00 GMT	Kent 84'	Report	Hope 57'	Stadium: Colchester Community Stadium; Attendance: 3,626; Referee: Trevor Kettle

2 March 2019 35	Newport County	2–0	Carlisle United	Newport, Wales
15:00 GMT	Azeez 14'; Amond 67'	Report		Stadium: Rodney Parade; Attendance: 3,432; Referee: Ross Joyce

9 March 2019 36	Carlisle United	2–1	Swindon Town	Carlisle
15:00 GMT	Hope 13'; O'Hare 79'	Report	Bennett 39'	Stadium: Brunton Park; Attendance: 4,629; Referee: Ben Toner

12 March 2019 37	Carlisle United	1–3	Notts County	Carlisle
19:45 GMT	Hope 76'	Report	Hemmings 37', 66' (pen.); Alessandra 90+4'	Stadium: Brunton Park; Attendance: 3,514; Referee: Eddie Ilderton

16 March 2019 38	Forest Green Rovers	1–1	Carlisle United	Nailsworth
15:00 GMT	Brown 31'	Report	Thomas 49'	Stadium: The New Lawn; Attendance: 2,381; Referee: Graham Salisbury

23 March 2019 39	Carlisle United	2–2	Cambridge United	Carlisle
15:00 GMT	Devitt 37'; Thomas 45+1'	Report	Hepburn-Murphy 3'; Ibehre 68'	Stadium: Brunton Park; Attendance: 4,673; Referee: Andy Haines

30 March 2019 40	Tranmere Rovers	3–0	Carlisle United	Birkenhead
15:00 GMT	Banks 45+1'; Norwood 64'; Monthé 82'	Report		Stadium: Prenton Park; Attendance: 8,095; Referee: Scott Duncan

6 April 2019 41	Carlisle United	3–2	Bury	Carlisle
15:00 BST	Devitt 1'; O'Hare 50'; Hope 89'	Report	Stokes 8', 43'	Stadium: Brunton Park; Attendance: 4,656; Referee: Chris Sarginson

13 April 2019 42	Stevenage	3–0	Carlisle United	Stevenage
15:00 BST	Iontton 16'; Guthrie 52', 62' (pen.)	Report		Stadium: Broadhall Way; Attendance: 2,770; Referee: Carl Boyeson

19 April 2019 43	Carlisle United	1–0	Lincoln City	Carlisle
15:00 BST	Jones 76'	Report		Stadium: Brunton Park; Attendance: 6,819; Referee: Lee Mason

22 April 2019 44	Grimsby Town	1–0	Carlisle United	Grimsby
15:00 BST	Grayson 90'	Report		Stadium: Blundell Park; Attendance: 3,647; Referee: Paul Marsden

27 April 2019 45	Carlisle United	4–2	Crawley Town	Carlisle
15:00 BST	Thomas 7', 9'; O'Hare 20'; Hope 31'	Report	Nathaniel-George 44'; Gerrard 77' (o.g.)	Stadium: Brunton Park; Attendance: 4,514; Referee: Scott Oldham

4 May 2019 46	Yeovil Town	0–0	Carlisle United	Yeovil
15:00 BST		Report		Stadium: Huish Park; Attendance: 3,418; Referee: Matt Donohue

Notes:

- ^(1) Carlisle's away match was postponed due to Crewe Alexandra's home ground, Gresty Road pitch was frozen.

=== FA Cup ===
The first round draw was made live on BBC by Dennis Wise and Dion Dublin on 22 October. The draw for the second round was made live on BBC and BT by Mark Schwarzer and Glenn Murray on 12 November.

10 November 2018 First round	Crewe Alexandra	0–1	Carlisle United	Crewe
15:00 BST		Report	Devitt 90'	Stadium: Gresty Road; Attendance: 2,467; Referee: Lee Swabey

1 December 2018 Second round	Lincoln City	2–0	Carlisle United	Lincoln
15:00 GMT	Rhead 1'; Akinde 86'	Report		Stadium: Sincil Bank; Attendance: 6,438; Referee: Dean Whitestone

=== EFL Cup ===
On 15 June 2018, the draw for the first round was made in Vietnam.

14 August 2018 First round	Carlisle United	1–5	Blackburn Rovers	Carlisle
19:45 BST	Hope 22'	Report	Armstrong 2', 54'; Dack 6', 34'; Palmer 40'	Stadium: Brunton Park; Attendance: 3,156; Referee: Ross Joyce

=== EFL Trophy ===
On 13 July 2018, the initial group stage draw bar the U21 invited clubs was announced.

Pos	Lge	Team	Pld	W	PW	PL	L	GF	GA	GD	Pts	Qualification
1	L1	Sunderland	3	2	1	0	0	4	1	+3	8	Round 2
2	ACA	Stoke City U21	3	1	1	1	0	3	2	+1	6	Round 2
3	L2	Carlisle United	3	1	0	1	1	5	6	−1	4	
4	L2	Morecambe	3	0	0	0	3	3	6	−3	0	

Source: EFL.com

4 September 2018 Group stages	Carlisle United	3–2	Morecambe	Carlisle
19:45 BST	Glendon 13'; Gillesphey 38'; Yates 76'	Report	Oliver 6'; Piggott 24'	Stadium: Brunton Park; Attendance: 1,213; Referee: Andy Haines

9 October 2018 Group stages	Sunderland	3–1	Carlisle United	Sunderland
19:45 BST	Mbunga-Kimpioka 3'; Robson 34'; Honeyman 63'	Report	Nadesan 22'	Stadium: Stadium of Light; Attendance: 8,112; Referee: Ben Toner

13 November 2018 Group stages	Carlisle United	1–1 (4–5 p)	Stoke City U21	Carlisle
19:45 GMT	Sowerby 22'	Report	Campbell 32'	Stadium: Brunton Park; Attendance: 882
	Penalties
	Grainger (penalty scored); Yates (penalty scored); Jones (penalty missed); Nadesan (penalty scored); McCarron (penalty scored); Miller (penalty missed)		Dunwoody (penalty missed); Campbell (penalty scored); Thandi (penalty scored); Clucas (penalty scored); Jarvis (penalty scored); Shenton (penalty scored)

== Transfers ==
=== Transfers in ===
Date from	Position	Nationality	Name	From	Fee	Ref.
1 July 2018	CB	(England)	Macaulay Gillesphey	(England) Newcastle United	Free transfer	
1 July 2018	DM	(England)	George Glendon	(England) Fleetwood Town	Free transfer	
1 July 2018	RB	(Scotland)	Gary Miller	(England) Plymouth Argyle	Free transfer	
4 July 2018	GK	(England)	Adam Collin	(England) Notts County	Free transfer	
9 August 2018	CB	(Republic of Ireland)	Anthony Gerrard	(England) Oldham Athletic	Free transfer	
31 August 2018	GK	(England)	Luke O'Reilly	(England) Tottenham Hotspur	Free transfer	
5 October 2018	GK	(Wales)	Louis Gray	(England) Nuneaton Borough	Free transfer	
21 January 2019	CF	(France)	Arthur Gnahoua	(England) Shrewsbury Town	Free transfer	
29 January 2019	CB	(Scotland)	Peter Grant	(England) Plymouth Argyle	Free transfer	
31 January 2019	AM	(Scotland)	Stefan Scougall	(Scotland) St Johnstone	Free transfer	

=== Transfers out ===
Date from	Position	Nationality	Name	To	Fee	Ref.
1 July 2018	RM	(Wales)	Nicky Adams	(England) Bury	Free transfer	
1 July 2018	GK	(England)	Morgan Bacon	(England) Stafford Rangers	Released	
1 July 2018	RW	(Jamaica)	Jamal Campbell-Ryce	(England) Stevenage	Released	
1 July 2018	CB	(England)	Mark Ellis	(England) Tranmere Rovers	Free transfer	
1 July 2018	CB	(England)	Clint Hill	Retired	—N/a	
1 July 2018	DM	(England)	Luke Joyce	(England) Port Vale	Free transfer	
1 July 2018	RM	(Bermuda)	Reggie Lambe	(England) Cambridge United	Released	
1 July 2018	CF	(England)	Shaun Miller	(England) Crewe Alexandra	Released	
1 July 2018	RB	(England)	Tom Miller	(England) Bury	Released	
1 July 2018	CM	(England)	Samir Nabi	(England) Torquay United	Released	
1 July 2018	RM	(Republic of Ireland)	John O'Sullivan	(England) Blackpool	Released	
1 July 2018	CF	(England)	Cameron Salkeld	(England) Gateshead	Released	
2 August 2018	CF	(England)	Cole Stockton	(England) Tranmere Rovers	Mutual consent	
8 November 2018	GK	(England)	Luke O'Reilly	(England) Chelmsford City	Mutual Consent	
1 January 2019	MF	(England)	Jordan Holt	(England) Workington	Mutual consent	
31 January 2019	DF	(England)	Kieron Olsen	(England) Whitley Bay	Mutual consent	
31 January 2019	MF	(England)	Sam Adewusi	(England) Wythenshawe Amateurs	Mutual consent	
31 January 2019	CF	(England)	Max Brown	(England) Penrith	Mutual consent	
31 January 2019	MF	(England)	Jack Egan	(England) Atherton Collieries	Mutual consent	

=== Loans in ===
Start date	Position	Nationality	Name	From	End date	Ref.
1 July 2018	GK	(England)	Joe Fryer	(England) Middlesbrough	31 May 2019	
20 July 2018	DF	(England)	Regan Slater	(England) Sheffield United	31 May 2019	
20 July 2018	CF	(England)	Jerry Yates	(England) Rotherham United	1 January 2019	
3 August 2018	SS	(England)	Adam Campbell	(England) Morecambe	January 2019	
17 August 2018	CF	(England)	Ashley Nadesan	(England) Fleetwood Town	7 January 2019	
31 August 2018	CM	(England)	Jack Sowerby	(England) Fleetwood Town	January 2019	
9 January 2019	CF	(England)	Connor Simpson	(England) Preston North End	31 May 2019	
28 January 2019	CF	(England)	Mark Cullen	(England) Blackpool	31 May 2019	
29 January 2019	CM	(England)	Callum O'Hare	(England) Aston Villa	31 May 2019	
29 January 2019	LW	(England)	Nathan Thomas	(England) Sheffield United	31 May 2019	

=== Loans out ===
Start date	Position	Nationality	Name	To	End date	Ref.
16 August 2018	CM	(England)	Jordan Holt	(England) Workington	November 2018	
25 August 2018	CF	(England)	Max Brown	(England) Workington	September 2018	
14 September 2018	RB	(England)	Kieron Olsen	(England) Workington	October 2018	
6 November 2018	CF	(England)	Max Brown	(England) Penrith	14 November 2018	
6 November 2018	RB	(England)	Kieron Olsen	(England) Penrith	14 November 2018	
14 November 2018	CF	(England)	Max Brown	(England) Kendal Town	January 2019	
14 November 2018	RB	(England)	Kieron Olsen	(England) Kendal Town	15 December 2018	
16 November 2018	CM	(England)	Jordan Holt	(England) Workington	31 December 2018	
17 January 2019	CF	(England)	Richie Bennett	(England) Morecambe	31 May 2019	
