= Jordan Holt =

Jordan Holt is the name of:

- Jordan Holt (footballer, born 1994), Welsh footballer
- Jordan Holt (footballer, born 2000), English footballer
