= 2017–18 Carlisle United F.C. season =

Carlisle United F.C.
2017–18 season
- Chairman: Andrew Jenkins
- Manager: Keith Curle
- Stadium: Brunton Park, Carlisle
- League Two: 10th
- FA Cup: Third round (vs. Sheffield Wednesday)
- EFL Cup: Second round (vs. Sunderland)
- EFL Trophy: Group Stage
- Top goalscorer: League: Jamie Devitt (10); All: Hallam Hope (13)
- Highest home attendance: 8,187 vs Sunderland, 22 August 2017
- Lowest home attendance: 909 vs Fleetwood Town, 8 November 2017
Home colours	Away colours

The 2017–18 season was Carlisle United's 113th season in their history and their fourth consecutive season in League Two. Along with League Two, the club participated in the FA Cup, EFL Cup and EFL Trophy. The season covered the period from 1 July 2017 to 30 June 2018.

== Squad statistics ==
As of 5 May 2018

No.	Pos	Nat	Player	Total		League Two		FA Cup		League Cup		EFL Trophy	
No.	Pos	Nat	Player	Apps	Goals	Apps	Goals	Apps	Goals	Apps	Goals	Apps	Goals
1	GK	(Republic of Ireland) IRL	Jack Bonham	49	0	42+0	0	5+0	0	2+0	0	0+0	0
2	DF	(England) ENG	Tom Miller	22	3	13+4	2	0+2	0	0+1	1	2+0	0
3	DF	(England) ENG	Danny Grainger	44	10	32+2	8	5+0	1	2+0	1	3+0	0
4	MF	(England) ENG	Luke Joyce	46	2	35+3	2	3+0	0	2+0	0	1+2	0
5	DF	(England) ENG	Gary Liddle	49	0	37+4	0	5+0	0	2+0	0	1+0	0
6	DF	(England) ENG	Tom Parkes	47	1	34+3	1	5+0	0	2+0	0	3+0	0
7	MF	(England) ENG	Jason Kennedy	8	1	1+5	0	0+0	0	0+1	0	1+0	1
8	MF	(England) ENG	Mike Jones	53	0	39+4	0	5+0	0	2+0	0	3+0	0
9	FW	(England) ENG	Hallam Hope	49	13	29+12	9	3+2	3	0+2	0	1+0	1
10	MF	(Wales) WAL	Nicky Adams	21	0	15+2	0	0+0	0	1+1	0	0+2	0
11	MF	(Republic of Ireland) IRL	Jamie Devitt	49	10	30+10	10	3+1	0	2+0	0	3+0	0
12	MF	(England) ENG	Samir Nabi	2	0	0+0	0	0+0	0	0+0	0	1+1	0
13	FW	(Jamaica) JAM	Jamal Campbell-Ryce	9	0	4+5	0	0+0	0	0+0	0	0+0	0
14	FW	(England) ENG	Richie Bennett	47	7	24+14	5	4+1	2	2+0	0	1+1	0
15	FW	(England) ENG	Sam Cosgrove (sold)	12	1	3+5	1	1+0	0	0+1	0	2+0	0
15	GK	(Wales) WAL	Louis Gray	0	0	0+0	0	0+0	0	0+0	0	0+0	0
16	DF	(England) ENG	Mark Ellis	27	2	21+2	2	1+0	0	2+0	0	1+0	0
17	DF	(England) ENG	James Brown	34	0	27+0	0	5+0	0	0+0	0	2+0	0
18	MF	(Republic of Ireland) IRL	John O'Sullivan	23	1	2+16	1	0+4	0	0+0	0	0+1	0
19	MF	(Bermuda) BER	Reggie Lambe	43	6	28+6	6	5+0	0	2+0	0	2+0	0
20	FW	(England) ENG	Shaun Miller (out on loan)	32	6	11+12	3	0+4	1	1+1	1	2+1	1
21	MF	(Nigeria) NGR	Kelvin Etuhu	23	3	13+7	3	1+1	0	0+0	0	1+0	0
22	GK	(England) ENG	Morgan Bacon	0	0	0+0	0	0+0	0	0+0	0	0+0	0
23	GK	(England) ENG	Shamal George (recalled)	7	0	4+0	0	0+0	0	0+0	0	3+0	0
23	FW	(England) ENG	Cole Stockton	12	1	10+2	1	0+0	0	0+0	0	0+0	0
24	MF	(England) ENG	Cameron Salkeld	0	0	0+0	0	0+0	0	0+0	0	0+0	0
25	MF	(England) ENG	Jordan Holt	0	0	0+0	0	0+0	0	0+0	0	0+0	0
26	MF	(England) ENG	Jack Egan	0	0	0+0	0	0+0	0	0+0	0	0+0	0
27	DF	(Scotland) SCO	Aidan Hutchinson	0	0	0+0	0	0+0	0	0+0	0	0+0	0
28	FW	(England) ENG	Steven Rigg (left)	4	0	0+3	0	0+0	0	0+0	0	0+1	0
28	FW	(Canada) CAN	Kris Twardek	12	0	5+7	0	0+0	0	0+0	0	0+0	0
29	DF	(England) ENG	Clint Hill	42	1	38+0	1	4+0	0	0+0	0	0+0	0
30	FW	(England) ENG	Ashley Nadesan	15	4	9+6	4	0+0	0	0+0	0	0+0	0

== Competitions ==
=== Friendlies ===
Carlisle United announced six pre-season friendlies against Penrith, Workington, Blyth Spartans, FC Halifax Town, Blackburn Rovers and Carlisle City.

8 July 2017	Carlisle City	0–4	Carlisle United	Carlisle
15:00 BST		Report	Kennedy 9', 34'; Miller 18'; Trialist 64'	Stadium: Gillford Park; Attendance: 708; Referee: Anthony Backhouse

11 July 2017	Penrith	0–5	Carlisle United	Penrith
19:00 BST		Report	Miller 2'; Devitt 37'; Trialist 40'; Hope 68'; Joyce 76'	Stadium: Frenchfields Stadium; Attendance: 810; Referee: Paul Best

12 July 2017	Workington	0–3	Carlisle United	Workington
19:30 BST		Report	Miller 56'; C Trialist 58'; D Trialist 71'	Stadium: Borough Park; Attendance: 681; Referee: Anthony Backhouse

15 July 2017	Blyth Spartans	0–3	Carlisle United	Blyth
15:00 BST		Report	Hope 79'; Liddle 82'; D Trialist 84'	Stadium: Croft Park; Attendance: 678; Referee: Dean Hulme

22 July 2017	FC Halifax Town	0–0	Carlisle United	Halifax
15:00 BST		Report		Stadium: The Shay; Attendance: 663; Referee: Mark Powell

28 July 2017	Carlisle United	3–1	Blackburn Rovers	Carlisle
19:45 BST	Nyambe 12' (o.g.); Lambe 41'; Miller 90'	Report	Graham 17'	Stadium: Brunton Park; Attendance: 1,816 (312 away); Referee: Anthony Backhouse

=== League Two ===
==== League table ====
Pos	Team	Pld	W	D	L	GF	GA	GD	Pts
8	Mansfield Town	46	18	18	10	67	52	+15	72
9	Swindon Town	46	20	8	18	67	65	+2	68
10	Carlisle United	46	17	16	13	62	54	+8	67
11	Newport County	46	16	16	14	56	58	−2	64
12	Cambridge United	46	17	13	16	56	60	−4	64

Source: BBC Sport
Rules for classification: 1) Points; 2) Goal difference; 3) Number of goals scored

==== Results summary ====
Overall								Home						Away					
Pld	W	D	L	GF	GA	GD	Pts	W	D	L	GF	GA	GD	W	D	L	GF	GA	GD
46	17	16	13	62	54	+8	67	7	10	6	31	23	+8	10	6	7	31	31	0

Last updated: 5 May 2018.
Source: BBC

==== Results by matchday ====
Matchday	1	2	3	4	5	6	7	8	9	10	11	12	13	14	15	16	17	18	19	20	21	22	23	24	25	26	27	28	29	30	31	32	33	34	35	36	37	38	39	40	41	42	43	44	45	46
Ground	H	A	H	A	H	A	A	H	A	H	A	H	A	H	H	A	H	A	A	H	A	H	A	H	H	A	H	A	H	A	H	A	H	A	A	H	A	H	H	A	H	A	A	H	A	H
Result	L	W	W	L	D	L	L	D	W	L	W	L	W	D	D	D	W	W	L	D	D	L	W	W	L	L	W	D	W	L	D	L	W	W	W	W	D	D	D	W	L	D	D	D	W	D
Position	17	11	5	11	11	16	19	18	15	17	14	16	14	15	16	16	14	11	12	14	14	14	13	13	13	13	13	12	13	13	13	13	13	12	10	9	10	10	10	10	11	10	10	10	9	10

Updated to match(es) played on 13 January 2018. Source: Statto.com
A = Away; H = Home; W = Win; D = Draw; L = Loss

==== Matches ====
On 21 June 2017, the league fixtures were announced.

5 August 2017 1	Carlisle United	1–2	Swindon Town	Carlisle
15:00 BST	Jones (yellow card) 41'; Joyce 55'	Report	Norris 31'; Mullin 48' (yellow card) 66'; Iandolo (yellow card) 78'; Smith (yellow card) 90'	Stadium: Brunton Park; Attendance: 6,036; Referee: Andy Haines

12 August 2017 2	Cambridge United	1–2	Carlisle United	Cambridge
15:00 BST	Elito 14' (pen.) (yellow card) 51'	Report	Lambe 8'; Parkes 39' (yellow card) 75'	Stadium: Abbey Stadium; Attendance: 4,102; Referee: Tom Nield

19 August 2017 3	Carlisle United	3–0	Cheltenham Town	Carlisle
15:00 BST	Pell 5' (o.g.); Lambe 18'; Miller 60'; Ellis (yellow card) 70'	Report	Pell (yellow card) 59'	Stadium: Brunton Park; Attendance: 4,497; Referee: Martin Coy

26 August 2017 4	Lincoln City	4–1	Carlisle United	Lincoln
15:00 BST	Woodyard 31', 62'; Rhead 67' (pen.); Knott 87'	Report	Bennett (yellow card) 45+3'; Parkes (yellow card) 57' (yellow-red card) 66'; Lambe 75'	Stadium: Sincil Bank; Attendance: 8,345; Referee: Eddie Ilderton

2 September 2017 5	Carlisle United	1–1	Mansfield Town	Carlisle
15:00 BST	Hope 15'; Joyce (yellow card) 25'; Ellis (yellow card) 42'	Report	Mellis (yellow card) 27'; Angol (yellow card) 42'; Butcher 58' (yellow card) 82'; Mirfin (yellow card) 86'	Stadium: Brunton Park; Attendance: 4,677; Referee: Darren Handley

9 September 2017 6	Accrington Stanley	3–0	Carlisle United	Accrington
15:00 BST	Kee 17'; McConville 43', 57'	Report	Miller (yellow card) 42'	Stadium: Crown Ground; Attendance: 2,120; Referee: David Webb

12 September 2017 7	Coventry City	2–0	Carlisle United	Coventry
19:45 BST	Nazon 48'; Vincenti (yellow card) 56' (goal) 80'	Report	Grainger (yellow card) 57'; Joyce (yellow card) 72'; Hope (yellow card) 84'	Stadium: Ricoh Arena; Attendance: 6,151; Referee: Trevor Kettle

16 September 2017 8	Carlisle United	1–1	Barnet	Carlisle
15:00 BST	Miller 85'	Report	Akpa Akpro 8'	Stadium: Brunton Park; Attendance: 4,141; Referee: Scott Oldham

23 September 2017 9	Crewe Alexandra	0–5	Carlisle United	Crewe
15:00 BST	Raynes (yellow card) 48'	Report	Grainger 13', 48' (pen.); Raynes 72' (o.g.); Lambe 75'; Hope 90+4'	Stadium: Gresty Road; Attendance: 4,021; Referee: Ross Joyce

26 September 2017 10	Carlisle United	0–2	Stevenage	Carlisle
19:45 BST	Joyce (yellow card) 53'; Grainger (yellow card) 76'; Bennett (yellow card) 90+3'	Report	Godden (yellow card) 24'; Kennedy 51'; Pett 60'	Stadium: Brunton Park; Attendance: 3,701; Referee: Michael Salisbury

30 September 2017 11	Crawley Town	0–1	Carlisle United	Crawley
15:00 BST	Roberts (yellow card) 40'; Evina (yellow card) 64'; Yorwerth (red card) 90+4'; Young (yellow card) 90+5'; Boldewijn (yellow card) 90+5'	Report	Hope 51'; Hill (yellow card) 56'; Bennett (red card) 74'; Parkes (red card) 90+5'; Jones (yellow card) 90+6'	Stadium: Broadfield Stadium; Attendance: 2,021; Referee: Kevin Johnson

7 October 2017 12	Carlisle United	0–1	Exeter City	Carlisle
15:00 BST	Hill (yellow card) 19'	Report	Sweeney 49'	Stadium: Brunton Park; Attendance: 4,677; Referee: Eddie Ilderton

14 October 2017 13	Colchester United	0–1	Carlisle United	Colchester
15:00 BST	Mandron (yellow card) 90+1'	Report	Brown (yellow card) 56'; Devitt 58'; Grainger (yellow card) 81'	Stadium: Colchester Community Stadium; Attendance: 3,402; Referee: Charles Breakspear

17 October 2017 14	Carlisle United	3–3	Wycombe Wanderers	Carlisle
19:45 BST	Lambe 4', 84'; Devitt 38' (pen.)	Report	Saunders (yellow card) 37' (goal) 45+2'; Akinfenwa 72'; Cowan-Hall 90+4'	Stadium: Brunton Park; Attendance: 3,562; Referee: Scott Duncan

21 October 2017 15	Carlisle United	1–1	Notts County	Carlisle
15:00 BST	Hope 25'; Miller (yellow card) 90'	Report	Yates 58'	Stadium: Brunton Park; Attendance: 4,730; Referee: David Webb

28 October 2017 16	Chesterfield	2–2	Carlisle United	Chesterfield
15:00 BST	Briggs (yellow card) 9'; McCourt 40'; Dennis 84'	Report	Liddle (yellow card) 39'; Grainger 55'; Bennett 73'	Stadium: Proact Stadium; Attendance: 5,102; Referee: Brett Huxtable

11 November 2017 17	Carlisle United	4–0	Yeovil Town	Carlisle
15:00 GMT	Grainger 7', 75' (pen.); Hope 44'; Miller 90+1'	Report	Browne (yellow card) 30'; Green (yellow card) 72'; Mugabi (red card) 73'	Stadium: Brunton Park; Attendance: 4,189; Referee: Ben Toner

18 November 2017 18	Grimsby Town	0–1	Carlisle United	Cleethorpes
15:00 GMT		Report	Hill 70'	Stadium: Blundell Park; Attendance: 3,753; Referee: Robert Lewis

21 November 2017 19	Luton Town	3–0	Carlisle United	Luton
19:45 GMT	Shinnie 19'; Potts 30'; Sheehan (yellow card) 45'; Ruddock Mpanzu (yellow card) 70'; Cornick 76'	Report	Hope (yellow card) 45'; Joyce (yellow card) 51'; Grainger (yellow card) 90+1'	Stadium: Kenilworth Road; Attendance: 7,644; Referee: Chris Sarginson

25 November 2017 20	Carlisle United	1–1	Morecambe	Carlisle
15:00 GMT	Etuhu 51'; Lambe (yellow card) 77'	Report	Old (yellow card) 7'; Thompson 72'	Stadium: Brunton Park; Attendance: 5,010; Referee: Darren Handley

9 December 2017 21	Newport County	3–3	Carlisle United	Newport
15:00 GMT	McCoulsky 43'; Dolan 56', 69'; Nouble (yellow card) 65'; Willmott (yellow card) 90'	Report	Joyce 46'; Etuhu 52'; Miller 62'	Stadium: Rodney Parade; Attendance: 3,176; Referee: Lee Swabey

16 December 2017 22	Carlisle United	1–2	Port Vale	Carlisle
15:00	Bennett 80'	Report	Barnett 51'; Pope 69'	Stadium: Brunton Park; Attendance: 4,090; Referee: (England) Michael Salisbury

23 December 2017 23	Forest Green Rovers	0–1	Carlisle United	Nailsworth
15:00	Roberts (yellow card) 81'; Stevens (yellow card) 84'; Laird (yellow card) 90+4'	Report	Bennett 28'; Grainger (yellow card) 86'; Miller (yellow card) 90+4'	Stadium: The New Lawn; Attendance: 2,489; Referee: (England) Kevin Johnson

26 December 2017 24	Carlisle United	3–1	Accrington Stanley	Carlisle
15:00	Devitt 11'; Miller 78'; Grainger 83'	Report	Kee 47' (pen.) (yellow card) 65'	Stadium: Brunton Park; Attendance: 5,404; Referee: (England) Steve Martin

30 December 2017 25	Carlisle United	0–1	Coventry City	Carlisle
15:00	Grainger (yellow card) 67'; Devitt (yellow card) 85'	Report	McNulty 50'; Davies (yellow card) 80'; Biamou (yellow card) 85'	Stadium: Brunton Park; Attendance: 5,807; Referee: (England) Scott Oldham

1 January 2018 26	Mansfield Town	3–1	Carlisle United	Mansfield
15:00	Hemmings 9' 75'; Bennett 31'; Angol (yellow card) 51'; White (yellow card) 90+1'	Report	Devitt 67' (pen.); O'Sullivan (yellow card) 85'; Bennett (yellow card) 90+1'	Stadium: One Call Stadium; Attendance: 3,632; Referee: (England) Darren Drysdale

13 January 2018 27	Carlisle United	1–0	Crewe Alexandra	Carlisle
15:00	Cosgrove 76'; Bennett (yellow card) 80'	Report	Walker (yellow card) 74'; Raynes (yellow card) 75'	Stadium: Brunton Park; Attendance: 4,467; Referee: (England) Cghris Sarginson

20 January 2018 28	Stevenage	0–0	Carlisle United	Stevenage
15:00 GMT	Kennedy (yellow card) 32'	Report	Bennett (yellow card) 24'	Stadium: Lamex Stadium; Attendance: 2,476; Referee: Charles Breakspear

27 January 2018 29	Carlisle United	1–0	Forest Green Rovers	Carlisle
15:00	Devitt 27'; Bonham (yellow card) 66'; Joyce (yellow card) 89'	Report	Bennett (yellow card) 41'; Gunning (yellow card) 60'; Collins (yellow card) 89'; Campbell (yellow card) 90+6'	Stadium: Brunton Park; Attendance: 4,176; Referee: (England) Eddie Ilderton

3 February 2018 30	Wycombe Wanderers	4–3	Carlisle United	High Wycombe
15:00 GMT	Bloomfield 28'; O'Nien 31' (red card) 48'; Cowan-Hall 90+3'; Bean 90+6'	Report	Parkes (yellow card) 22'; Grainger 49' (pen.); Bonham (yellow card) 61'; Devitt 68'; Stockton 70'; Twardek (yellow card) 72'	Stadium: Adams Park; Attendance: 4,145; Referee: Carl Boyeson

10 February 2018 31	Carlisle United	1–1	Colchester United	Carlisle
15:00 GMT	Devitt 79'	Report	Senior 44'	Stadium: Brunton Park; Attendance: 4,006; Referee: Ross Joyce

13 February 2018 32	Notts County	2–1	Carlisle United	Nottingham
19:45 GMT	Stead 19', 35'; Noble (yellow card) 62'; Duffy (yellow card) 79'; Husin (yellow card) 80'; Alessandra (yellow card) 81'	Report	Devitt 75'	Stadium: Meadow Lane; Attendance: 3,889; Referee: Darren Drysdale

17 February 2018 33	Carlisle United	2–0	Chesterfield	Carlisle
15:00 GMT	Etuhu 19'; Liddle (yellow card) 41'; O'Sullivan 81'	Report	Barry (yellow card) 37'; Kellett (yellow card) 63'; Brown (yellow card) 90'	Stadium: Brunton Park; Attendance: 4,025; Referee: Sebastian Stockbridge

20 February 2018 34	Barnet	1–3	Carlisle United	London
20:00 GMT	Almeida Santos 50'; Watson (yellow card) 86'	Report	Nadesan 70', 87'; Bennett 82', (yellow card) 90+1'	Stadium: The Hive Stadium; Attendance: 1,151; Referee: Chris Sarginson

24 February 2018 35	Yeovil Town	0–1	Carlisle United	Yeovil
15:00 GMT	Browne (yellow card) 55'	Report	Hope 48'	Stadium: Huish Park; Attendance: 2,688; Referee: Anthony Coggins

3 March 2018 36	Carlisle United	2–0	Grimsby Town	Carlisle
15:00 GMT	Hope 3'; Hill (yellow card) 65'; Ellis 73'	Report	Dixon (yellow card) 41'; Berrett (yellow card) 45+1'	Stadium: Brunton Park; Attendance: 4,151; Referee: Scott Oldham

10 March 2018 37	Exeter City	1–1	Carlisle United	Exeter
15:00 GMT	Moxey 42'	Report	Joyce (yellow card) 20'; Liddle (yellow card) 40'; Nadesan 64'	Stadium: St. James Park; Attendance: 3,488; Referee: John Busby

17 March 2018 38	Carlisle United	2–2	Crawley Town	Carlisle
15:00 GMT	Bennett 38'; Hill (yellow card) 45+2'; Hope 47', (yellow card) 60'; Parkes (yellow card) 48'	Report	Grant 56', 81'; Boldewijn (yellow card) 60'	Stadium: Brunton Park; Attendance: 4,097; Referee: Martin Coy

24 March 2018 39	Carlisle United	1–1	Cambridge United	Carlisle
	Bennett 47'	Report	Maris 50'; Brown (yellow card) 62'; Deegan (yellow card) 77'	Stadium: Brunton Park; Attendance: 4,652; Referee: Richard Clark

30 March 2018 40	Cheltenham Town	0–1	Carlisle United	Cheltenham
15:00 GMT	Sellars (yellow card) 24'; Moore (yellow card) 73'	Report	Devitt (yellow card) 29', (goal) 74' (pen.); Ellis (yellow card) 33'; Bennett (yellow card) 45'; Joyce (yellow card) 60'	Stadium: Whaddon Road; Attendance: 3,107; Referee: Nick Kinseley

2 April 2018 41	Carlisle United	0–1	Lincoln City	Carlisle
	Parkes (yellow card) 45'; Jones (yellow card) 68' (yellow-red card) 90+5'; Devitt (yellow card) 86'	Report	Green (yellow card) 34', (goal) 43'	Stadium: Brunton Park; Attendance: 5,068; Referee: Robert Lewis

7 April 2018 42	Swindon Town	0–0	Carlisle United	Swindon
15:00 BST	Dunne (yellow card) 17'	Report	Twardek (yellow card) 50'; Devitt (yellow card) 88'; Nadesan (yellow card) 90+3'	Stadium: County Ground; Attendance: 5,807; Referee: Brett Huxtable

14 April 2018 43	Morecambe	1–1	Carlisle United	Morecambe
15:00 BST	Conlan (yellow card) 13'; Lang 29'	Report	Devitt 14', (yellow card) 69'	Stadium: Globe Arena; Attendance: 3,319; Referee: John Brooks

21 April 2018 44	Carlisle United	1–1	Luton Town	Carlisle
15:00 BST	Grainger 13' (pen.) (yellow card) 77'; Ellis (yellow card) 45'; Jones (yellow card) 90+2'	Report	Potts (yellow card) 44'; Lee 62'	Stadium: Brunton Park; Attendance: 5,523; Referee: Seb Stockbridge

28 April 2018 45	Port Vale	1–2	Carlisle United	Burslem
15:00 BST	Angus 34'; Kay (red card) 85'	Report	Nadesan 51'; Hope 70'; Parkes (yellow card) 89'	Stadium: Vale Park; Attendance: 5,163; Referee: Ben Toner

5 May 2018 46	Carlisle United	1–1	Newport County	Carlisle
15:00 BST	Ellis 14'	Report	Amond 38'; Willmott (yellow card) 78'	Stadium: Brunton Park; Attendance: 5,311; Referee: Mark Heywood

=== FA Cup ===
On 16 October 2017, Carlisle United were drawn at home against Oldham Athletic in the first round. In the second round Carlisle were given an away trip to Gillingham.

4 November 2017 First round	Carlisle United	3–2	Oldham Athletic	Carlisle
15:00 GMT	Bennett 22', 60'; Hope 36'	Report	Clarke 64'; Amadi-Holloway 72'; Davies (yellow card) 90+4'	Stadium: Brunton Park; Attendance: 3,965; Referee: Andy Haines

2 December 2017 Second round	Gillingham	1–1	Carlisle United	Gillingham
14:00 GMT	O'Neill 5'; Clare (yellow card) 40'	Report	Grainger 18' (pen.)	Stadium: Priestfield Stadium; Attendance: 3,178; Referee: Andy Woolmer

12 December 2017 Second round replay	Carlisle United	v	Gillingham	Carlisle
19:45 GMT				Stadium: Brunton Park
Note: On 12 December, the second round replay match was postponed due to recent extremely cold spell of weather.

19 December 2017 Second round replay	Carlisle United	3–1	Gillingham	Carlisle
19:45 GMT	Hope 7' 37'; Liddle (yellow card) 73'; Lambe (yellow card) 86'; Miller (yellow card) 90+2'; Miller 90+3'	Report	Clare (yellow card) 25'; Wagstaff 47'; Byrne (yellow card) 57'; Parker (yellow card) 66'; Ehmer (yellow card) 77'; O'Neill (yellow card) 90+1'	Stadium: Brunton Park; Attendance: 2,357; Referee: Mark Heywood

6 January 2018 Third round	Carlisle United	0–0	Sheffield Wednesday	Carlisle
15:00 GMT	Cosgrove (yellow card) 45'	Report		Stadium: Brunton Park; Attendance: 7,793; Referee: David Webb

16 January 2018 Third round replay	Sheffield Wednesday	2–0	Carlisle United	Sheffield
19:45 GMT	Matias 28'; Nuhiu 66'	Report		Stadium: Hillsborough Stadium; Attendance: 12,003; Referee: Michael Salisbury

=== EFL Cup ===
On 16 June 2017, Carlisle United were drawn away to Fleetwood Town in the first round. Championship side Sunderland are the second round visitors.

8 August 2017 First round	Fleetwood Town	1–2 (a.e.t.)	Carlisle United	Fleetwood
19:45 BST	Maguire (yellow card) 6'; Hiwula 69'; O'Neill (yellow card) 75'; Bolger (yellow card) 90+2'; Rodgers (red card) 105+2'	Report	S.Miller 22'; Devitt (yellow card) 71'; Liddle (yellow card) 85'; Grainger (yellow card) 95'; T.Miller 101' (yellow card) 104'; Hope (yellow card) 116'	Stadium: Highbury Stadium; Attendance: 1,711; Referee: Graham Salisbury

22 August 2017 Second round	Carlisle United	1–2	Sunderland	Carlisle
19:45 BST	Grainger 60'	Report	Love 25'; Khazri (yellow card) 57'; Djilobodji (yellow card) 59'; Ndong (yellow card) 64'; Gooch 80'	Stadium: Brunton Park; Attendance: 8,187; Referee: Darren Bond

=== EFL Trophy ===
Pos	Lge	Team	Pld	W	PW	PL	L	GF	GA	GD	Pts	Qualification
1	L1	Fleetwood Town (Q)	3	3	0	0	0	7	2	+5	9	Round 2
2	ACA	Leicester City U21 (Q)	3	1	0	1	1	3	5	−2	4	Round 2
3	L2	Carlisle United (E)	3	1	0	0	2	3	3	0	3	
4	L2	Morecambe (E)	3	0	1	0	2	3	6	−3	2	

Updated to match(es) played on 8 November 2017. Source: EFL.com
(E) Eliminated; (Q) Qualified to the phase indicated

29 August 2017 Group Game 1	Morecambe	0–2	Carlisle United	Morecambe
19:45 BST	Fleming (yellow card) 82'	Report	Hope 1'; Kennedy 44'	Stadium: Globe Arena; Attendance: 1,228

3 October 2017 Group Game 2	Carlisle United	0–1	Leicester City U23s	Carlisle
19:45 BST		Report	Ndukwu 20'	Stadium: Brunton Park; Attendance: 1,009; Referee: Ben Toner

8 November 2017 Group Game 3	Carlisle United	1–2	Fleetwood Town	Carlisle
19:45 GMT	Devitt (yellow card) 33'; T. Miller (yellow card) 55'; S. Miller 86'	Report	Sowerby 10'; Biggins (yellow card) 29'; Burns 44'	Stadium: Brunton Park; Attendance: 909; Referee: Martin Coy

== Transfers ==
=== Transfers in ===
Date from	Position	Nationality	Name	From	Fee	Ref.
1 July 2017	DM	(Nigeria)	Kelvin Etuhu	(England) Bury	Free	
1 July 2017	CF	(England)	Hallam Hope	(England) Bury	Free	
4 July 2017	CB	(England)	Tom Parkes	(England) Leyton Orient	Free	
25 July 2017	CF	(England)	Richie Bennett	(England) Barrow	Undisclosed	
1 August 2017	CF	(England)	Sam Cosgrove	(England) Wigan Athletic	Free	
21 September 2017	CB	(England)	Clint Hill	(Scotland) Rangers	Free	
12 October 2017	SS	(England)	Steven Rigg	(Scotland) Queen of the South	Free	
26 January 2018	CF	(England)	Cole Stockton	(Scotland) Heart of Midlothian	Free	
31 January 2018	RW	(Jamaica)	Jamal Campbell-Ryce	(England) Barnet	Undisclosed	

=== Transfers out ===
Date from	Position	Nationality	Name	To	Fee	Ref.
1 July 2017	CM	(England)	James Bailey	(England) Yeovil Town	Released	(Note: James Bailey joined Yeovil Town following his release.)
1 July 2017	LB	(England)	Patrick Brough	(England) Morecambe	Released	
1 July 2017	GK	(England)	Mark Gillespie	(England) Walsall	Rejected contract	(Note: Mark Gillespie joined Walsall after rejecting a new contract.)
1 July 2017	CF	(England)	Jabo Ibehre	(England) Cambridge United	Rejected contract	(Note: Jabo Ibehre joined Cambridge United after rejecting a new contract.)
1 July 2017	CF	(France)	Jean-Michel Joachim	(England) Kidderminster Harriers	Rejected contract	
1 July 2017	CB	(England)	Michael Raynes	(England) Crewe Alexandra	Rejected contract	(Note: Michael Raynes joined Crewe Alexandra after rejecting a new contract.)
1 July 2017	CF	(England)	Ben Tomlinson	(England) FC Halifax Town	Released	
1 July 2017	AM	(England)	James Hooper	(England) F.C. United of Manchester	Released	
1 July 2017	GK	(New Zealand)	Max Crocombe	(England) Salford City	Released	
1 July 2017	AM	(England)	Joe Ward	Retired	Released	
24 July 2017	CB	(England)	Shaun Brisley	(England) Notts County	Mutual consent	
31 January 2018	CF	(England)	Sam Cosgrove	(Scotland) Aberdeen	£27,000	

=== Loans in ===
Start date	Position	Nationality	Name	From	End date	Ref.
1 July 2017	GK	(Republic of Ireland)	Jack Bonham	(England) Brentford	31 May 2018	
1 August 2017	GK	(England)	Shamal George	(England) Liverpool	1 January 2018	
25 August 2017	CB	(England)	James Brown	(England) Millwall	31 May 2018	
26 January 2018	CF	(Canada)	Kris Twardek	(England) Millwall	31 May 2018	
31 January 2018	GK	(Wales)	Louis Gray	(England) Everton	31 May 2018	
31 January 2018	CF	(England)	Ashley Nadesan	(England) Fleetwood Town	31 May 2018	

=== Loans out ===
Start date	Position	Nationality	Name	To	End date	Ref.
25 August 2017	CM	(England)	Jordan Holt	(England) Workington	25 September 2017	
8 September 2017	GK	(England)	Morgan Bacon	(England) Shaw Lane	8 October 2017	
26 September 2017	RW	(England)	Jack Egan	(England) Workington	26 October 2017	
26 September 2017	CM	(England)	Jordan Holt	(England) Workington	26 October 2017	
28 September 2017	CB	(England)	Mark Ellis	(England) Leyton Orient	28 November 2017	
26 October 2017	CM	(England)	Jordan Holt	(England) Workington	26 November 2017	
16 November 2017	GK	(England)	Morgan Bacon	(England) Kendal Town	16 December 2017	
23 November 2017	CM	(England)	Cameron Salkeld	(England) Whitby Town	20 December 2017	
20 December 2017	CM	(England)	Cameron Salkeld	(England) Whitby Town	20 January 2018	
25 January 2018	CF	(England)	Shaun Miller	(England) Crewe Alexandra	31 May 2018	
31 January 2018	CM	(England)	Cameron Salkeld	(Scotland) Annan Athletic	30 April 2018	
