= Kelvin Etuhu =

Nigerian footballer

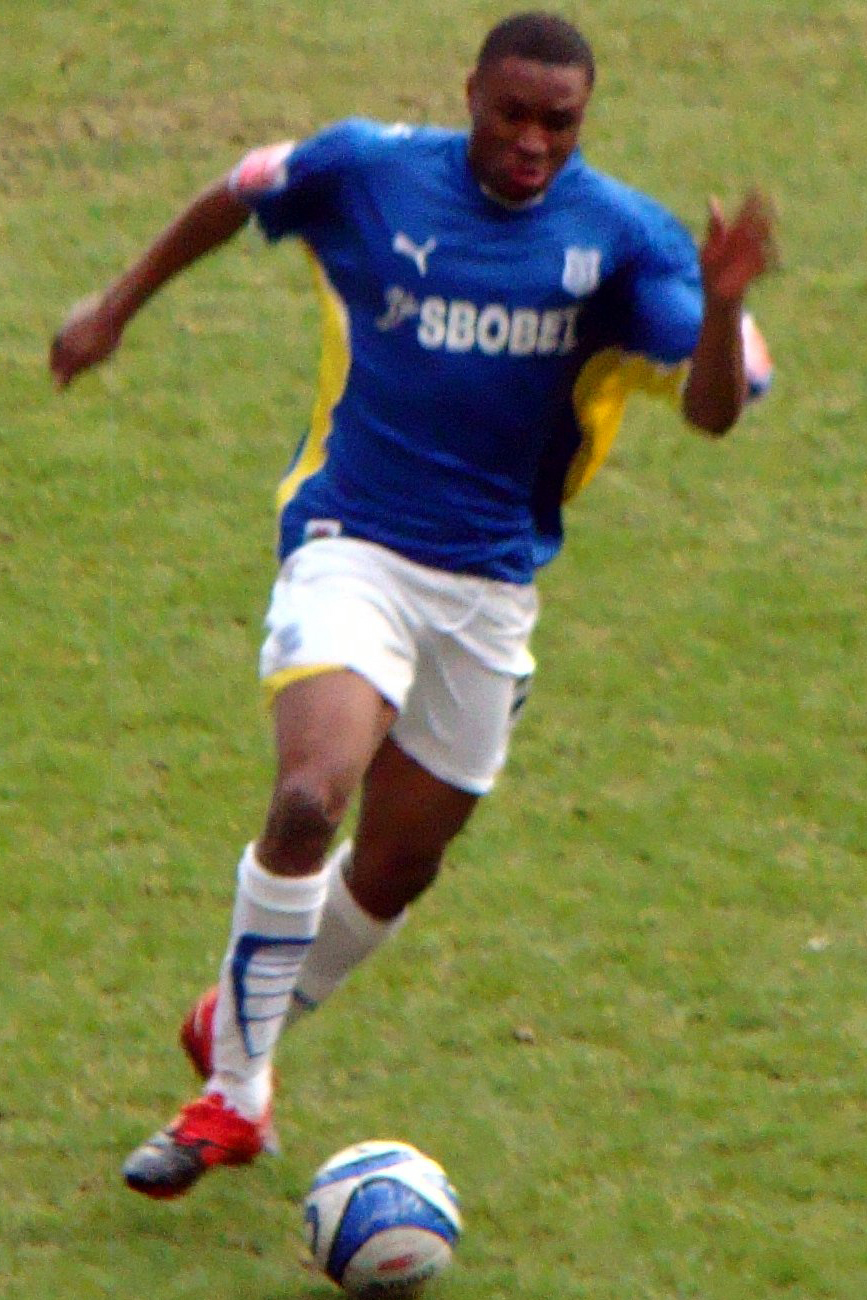
- Etuhu playing for Cardiff City

Personal information
- Full name: Kelvin Peter Etuhu
- Date of birth: 30 May 1988 (age 38)
- Place of birth: Kano, Nigeria
- Height: 1.80 m (5 ft 11 in)
- Position: Midfielder

Youth career
- 2004–2006: Manchester City

Senior career*
Years	Team	Apps	(Gls)
2006–2011	Manchester City	10	(1)
2007	→ Rochdale (loan)	4	(2)
2008	→ Leicester City (loan)	4	(0)
2009–2010	→ Cardiff City (loan)	19	(0)
2012	Portsmouth	13	(1)
2012–2014	Barnsley	46	(0)
2014–2017	Bury	81	(4)
2017–2020	Carlisle United	59	(3)
Total		236	(11)

International career
2006	England U19	3	(0)
- * Club domestic league appearances and goals

Kelvin Peter Etuhu (born 30 May 1988) is a Nigerian former professional footballer. Etuhu has two older brothers, Dickson Etuhu, also a professional footballer, and Michael Etuhu. He played as a striker or as a winger.

== Club career ==
=== Manchester City ===
Etuhu started his football career at AFC Lewisham and Millwall but he left both clubs at some point before his family moved to Manchester. Upon settling at Manchester, Etuhu joined Manchester City’s academy in 2002, the same year when his older brother, Dickson Etuhu left Manchester City for Preston North End. While progressing through the Manchester City’s academy, Etuhu said Dickson gave him guidance and advice. He made an impact for the Manchester City’s academy in the FA Youth Cup by scoring goals against West Ham United, Nottingham Forest, Manchester United and Newcastle United, to reach the 2005–06 season’s FA Youth Cup final. Etuhu played in both legs of the FA Youth Cup finals against Liverpool, where the club’s academy loss 3–2 on aggregate. Following this, he signed his first professional contract with Manchester City. Etuhu was also named as "the most promising player" at the club’s award ceremony.

After six months absent with a knee injury, Etuhu was called up to the first team by manager Sven-Göran Eriksson in the 2007–08 season. On 25 September 2007, he made his first appearance for the Manchester City’s first team, coming on as a substitute and set up the winning goal for Georgios Samaras, in a 1–0 win against Norwich City in the League Cup. On 1 December 2007, he made his Premier League debut, coming on as a 69th minute substitute, in a 1–1 draw against Wigan Athletic. On 15 December 2007, Etuhu scored his first goal for the club, in a 4–2 win against Bolton Wanderers. Six days later on 21 December 2007, he signed a contract with Manchester City, keeping him until the end of the 2009–10 season. Etuhu made four more appearances for the club before he was loaned out to Leicester City.

In the 2008–09 season, Etuhu made his European debut, coming on as a 69th minute substitute, in a 2–0 win against EB/Streymur in the second leg of the UEFA Cup first round to send Manchester City through to the next round. On 24 August 2008, however, he suffered a hamstring injury despite playing 13 minutes after coming on as a substitute, in a 3–0 win against West Ham United. After not playing in the first team for the next seven months, he returned from injury, coming on as a 87th minute substitute, in a 2–0 win against Aalborg BK in the first leg of the UEFA Cup last 16. In a match against Fulham on 12 April 2009, Kelvin played against his brother Dickson for the first time, and the match finished with the club losing 3–1. At the end of the 2008–09 season, he went on to make seven appearances in all competitions.

Following his loan spell at Cardiff City ended, Etuhu was not included in Manchester City's Premier League squad for the 2010–11 season. Due to lack of first team opportunities, it was expected that he would be leaving the club at the end of the season. On 24 March 2011, however, Etuhu was released from his contract earlier than expected, following his jailing for an assault outside a Manchester casino.

==== Loan Spells from Manchester City ====
On 5 January 2007, Etuhu was loaned out to Rochdale on a one month loan. He scored on his debut for the club, coming on in the 56th minute against Wycombe Wanderers and scoring in the 80th minute. On 27 January 2007, Etuhu scored his second goal for Rochdale, in a 5–0 win against Milton Keynes Dons. On 3 February 2007, however, he sustained a knee injury during a 1–1 draw against Walsall, which prompted his return to Manchester City..

On 4 March 2008, Etuhu joined Leicester City on loan until the end of the 2007–08 season. On 8 March 2008, he made his debut for the club, starting the match, in 0–0 draw against Bristol City. However, Etuhu remained the final two months of his loan on the substitute bench, making brief appearances for the relegated Foxes, due the club’s preference of new signing, David Bell from Luton Town.

Ahead of the 2009–10 season, Etuhu was told by Manchester City that he was deemed surplus of requirement and was expecting to leave the club. On 22 August 2009, Etuhu joined Football League Championship side Cardiff City on a season-long loan. He made his debut for the club the next day, in a 3–0 win over Bristol City in the Severnside derby. However on 13 September 2009, Etuhu suffered an injury blow in only his fourth appearance with the side after he damaged ankle ligaments, in a 1–0 loss to Newcastle United and was ruled out for up to two months. Shortly after, Etuhu returned to Manchester for treatment. On 29 November 2009, he returned from injury, coming on as a substitute for Chris Burke, in a 2–1 loss to Ipswich Town. The following month saw Etuhu sustain two injuries on two separate occasions during two matches against West Bromwich Albion and Middlesbrough, but he made a quick recovery twice. However, Etuhu suffered ankle injury, his third injury in a month and was out for three months. As a result, he returned to Manchester for treatment for the second time. On 27 March 2010, Etuhu returned to the starting line–up as a replacement for suspended Jay Bothroyd, in a 2–1 win against Crystal Palace. He featured in the play-offs where Cardiff City loss 3–2 to Blackpool in the final. At the end of the 2009–10 season, Etuhu made twenty appearances in all competitions and returned to his parent club.

=== Portsmouth ===
On 19 January 2012, Etuhu signed for Portsmouth until the end of the season, with the option of another year after he spend two months training with the club. Then manager Michael Appleton backed Etuhu to shine at Portsmouth and seize a second chance of a football career there, having failed to get a contract at Leeds United and Kavala.

On 21 January 2012, he made his debut for the club, starting a match, in a 3–2 loss to Cardiff City. Etuhu, however, suffered a hamstring injury that saw him out for weeks. During his time at Portsmouth, the club went into administration for the second time in two years. On 27 February 2012, he extended his stay by another month having been given the green light by the Football League. On 20 March 2012, Etuhu scored his return from injury, as Portsmouth won 4–1 against Birmingham City at Fratton Park. Following this, he alternated between a starting and a substitute role towards the end of the season. On 21 April 2012, however, the club was relegated to League One after losing 2–1 against Derby County. At the end of the 2011–12 season, Etuhu went on to make thirteen times and scoring once in all competitions.

Following the season's final game with Portsmouth relegated, Etuhu expressed his desire to stay at the club and stated that he was loving life on the South Coast. But Sky Sports understood that Bradford City and Barnsley were subsequently interest in signing Etuhu. On 22 May 2012, manager Appleton confirmed that Etuhu was offered a two-year contract and was confident he would remain at Portsmouth.

=== Barnsley ===
After being offered a new contract by Portsmouth, it was announced on 9 June 2012 that Etuhu has agreed to sign for Barnsley on a one-year contract, becoming Keith Hill's first signing of the summer where he played under Hill during his time at Rochdale. Hill revealed that he tried to sign Etuhu the previous season but Portsmouth won the race. Upon joining the club, he was given a number twenty-three shirt.

On 11 August 2012, Etuhu made his debut for Barnsley, starting a match and played 70 minutes before being substitute, in a 4–0 win against Rochdale in the first round of the League Cup. However, under the management of Keith Hill, he lost his first team place and his playing time of minutes significantly decreased, mostly coming from the substitute bench. Following the sacking of Hill, Etuhu received more playing time, under the management of David Flitcroft and played in the central-midfield position. On 16 March 2013, he performed his best at the club by playing in "a more central role" and was named man of the match, a 1–0 win over Watford. On the last game of the season, he helped the club avoid relegation, in a 2–2 draw against Huddersfield Town. Despite suffering two injuries later in the 2012–13 season, Etuhu went on to make thirty appearances in all competitions. Following this, he signed a two–year contract after the club offered a him a new contract.

At the start of the 2013–14 season, Etuhu suffered a hamstring injury that saw him miss the first two league matches. On 17 August 2013, he returned from injury, coming on as a 33rd minute substitute, in a 2–2 draw against Charlton Athletic. However, he lost his first team place, due to competitions, his own injury concern and was placed on the substitute bench upon returning in March. Etuhu began to play in the right–back position for the rest of the season. On 5 April 2014, however, he received a straight red card in the 76th minutes, in a 0–0 draw against Brighton & Hove Albion. After serving a one match suspension, Etuhu returned to the starting line–up in a right–back position, in a 1–0 loss against Bolton Wanderers on 12 April 2014. However, he suffered ankle injury that saw him miss one match. On 26 April 2014, Etuhu returned to the starting line–up, playing in the right–back position, in a 3–1 loss against Middlesbrough, resulting in the Barnsley’s relegation to League One. At the end of the 2013–14 season, he went on to make twenty–one appearances in all competitions. After two years at Barnsley, Etuhu was among ten players to stay at the club.

=== Bury ===
On 27 June 2014, Bury announced that Etuhu has signed a two-year deal with the club after his release from Barnsley. Upon joining Bury, he was given number six shirt this season.

However, he missed the first two matches of the 2014–15 season for the club, due to a flu. On 16 August 2014, Etuhu recovered from an illness and made his Bury debut, in a 2–0 win over Hartlepool United. Since joining the club, he established himself in the first team at Bury throughout the season, playing in various midfielder positions. On 4 October 2014, Etuhu scored his first goal for the club, in a 2–0 win over Tranmere Rovers. On the last game of the season, he helped Bury beat Tranmere Rovers to secure the club’s promotion to League One. Despite suffering injuries throughout the 2014–15 season, Etuhu made forty-six appearances and scoring two times in all competitions. Following this, he signed a two-year contract extension on 22 May 2015.

At the start of the 2015–16 season, Etuhu started in the first four matches for Bury, playing in either centre–midfield position or defensive midfield position. However, he suffered a foot injury that saw him out for three months. On 21 November 2015, Etuhu made his return from injury, coming on as a 58th minute substitute, in a 1–0 win against Burton Albion. After missing one match due to a knock at the beginning of the year, he returned from injury against Bradford City on 9 January 2016, and started the whole game, in a 0–0 draw. On 30 January 2016, however, Etuhu suffered a foot injury for the second time this season and was substituted in the 10th minutes, in a 3–1 loss against Hull City. On 13 February 2016, he returned to the starting line–up and played 22 minutes before injuring his hamstring and was substituted in the 22 minutes, losing 6–0 against Coventry City. On 9 April 2016, Etuhu made his return from injury, coming on as a second half substitute, in a 1–0 win against Doncaster Rovers. On 19 April 2016, however, he received a red card for a second bookable offence, in a 2–1 loss against Scunthorpe United. On 30 April 2016, Etuhu returned to the starting line–up from a one match suspension, in a 3–0 loss against Chesterfield. At the end of the 2015–16 season, he made twenty–three appearances in all competitions.

In the opening game of the 2016–17 season, Etuhu scored his first goal of the season, in a 2–0 win against Charlton Athletic. On 20 August 2016, however, he suffered an injury in the 41st minutes and was substituted, in a 1–0 loss against Oldham Athletic. On 24 September 2016, Etuhu returned from injury, coming on as a 85th minute substitute, in a 2–1 win against Chesterfield. Since returning from injury, he regained his first team place, playing in either centre–midfield position or defensive midfield position by the end of the year. However by February, Etuhu spent the rest of the out for the rest of the 2016–17 season under a new management of Lee Clark, with his playing time was reduced at the beginning of the year. At the end of the 2016–17 season, he made twenty–two appearances and scoring two times in all competitions. Following this, Etuhu was released by Bury.

=== Carlisle United ===
On 29 June 2017, Etuhu signed for Carlisle United on a free transfer, signing a two–year contract. Upon joining the club, he was given a number 21 shirt.

However, Etuhu suffered an injury during the pre–season and was sidelined throughout August. On 12 September, he made his debut for Carlisle United, in a 2–0 loss to Coventry City. Since joining the club, Etuhu found himself alternating between a starting and a substitute role. However, he suffered a thigh injury that saw him out throughout October. On 4 November 2017, Etuhu made his return from injury, coming on as a 69th minute substitute, in a 3–2 win against Oldham Athletic in the first round of the FA Cup. He scored his first goal for the club on 25 November in a 1–1 draw against Morecambe. This was followed up by scoring in a 3–3 draw against Newport County. However, Etuhu was sidelined with a leg injury and was out for three weeks. On 27 January 2018, he returned from injury, coming on as a 87th minute substitute, in a 1–0 win against Forest Green Rovers. On 17 February 2018, Etuhu scored his third goal of the season, but in the 22th minute to the game, he suffered an injury and was substituted, in a 2–0 win against Chesterfield. After the match, manager Keith Curle revealed that Etuhu suffered a hamstring injury and was out for the rest of the season. At the end of the 2017–18 season, he went on to make twenty–three appearances and scoring three times in all competitions.

In the 2018–19 season, Etuhu continued to establish himself in the first team, playing in both the centre–midfield position and defensive midfield position. He also played in the right–back position on three occasions. However, Etuhu suffered a hamstring injury and was sidelined for two weeks. On 24 November 2018, he returned from injury, coming on as a 64th minute substitute, in a 2–1 lost against Forest Green Rovers. Following this, Etuhu regained his first team place, playing in both the centre–midfield position and defensive midfield position. On 18 January 2019, Carlisle United opted to trigger their option of a contract extension that would ensure Etuhu remained under contract for another season. At the end of the 2018–19 season, he made forty–one appearances in all competitions.

He then suffered several hamstring injuries, keeping him out for an extensive period. By September, manager Steven Pressley said he was unsure on when Etuhu would return from his injury. In February 2020, manager Chris Beech said he hope to see Etuhu back from injury before the season. His hopes of returning was interrupted by the COVID-19 pandemic, causing the season to end immediately. Having made no appearances in the 2019–20 season, he was released by the club.

After being released by Carlisle United, Etuhu announced his retirement from football.

== International career ==
Although not capped at international level, Etuhu was eligible to play for England or Nigeria. He said his intention was to play for England. He had previously represented England at junior levels while at Manchester City. In May 2009, he declared his intention to pursue an international career with Nigeria.

== Personal life ==
Born in Kano, Nigeria, Etuhu moved to England a young age and grew up in Peckham, South London. he attended Saint Thomas the Apostle boys school before his family moved up to Manchester. Growing up with four brothers, Kelvin said he and Dickson were "the athletes in the family" and considered his older brother as an inspiration to motivate him to become a footballer.

On 13 July 2010, Etuhu was arrested on charges relating to an assault outside a Manchester casino in February. Three people were injured, he was charged with assault and appeared before the magistrates on 6 August 2010. He was given an eight-month jail sentence on 24 March 2011, after which Manchester City released him from his contract. In August 2011, he was released from prison, having served five months to his jail sentence. He later said "I made a mistake, people make mistakes, but I learned the hard way. Harder than maybe I should have learned but I am positive nothing like that will happen again. Today I would react a lot differently to what I did then. I have learned, I have definitely learned."

In March 2019, Etuhu became a father when his partner gave birth to a baby boy, causing him to miss two matches. In October 2020, he took part in helping the development of 250 young players across the borough at R-Kikx Academy. Following the end of his professional career, Etuhu moved onto a business career, as well as, taking up electrical engineering course.

== Career statistics ==
=== Club ===
Appearances and goals by club, season and competition
Club	Season	League			FA Cup		League Cup		Other		Total	
Club	Season	Division	Apps	Goals	Apps	Goals	Apps	Goals	Apps	Goals	Apps	Goals
Manchester City	2006–07	Premier League	0	0	0	0	0	0	–		0	0
Manchester City	2007–08	Premier League	6	1	1	0	1	0	–		8	1
Manchester City	2008–09	Premier League	4	0	0	0	0	0	3 (Note: Appearances in the UEFA Cup)	0	7	0
Manchester City	Total		10	1	1	0	1	0	3	0	15	1
Rochdale (loan)	2006–07	League Two	4	2	0	0	0	0	–	4	2	
Leicester City (loan)	2007–08	Championship	4	0	0	0	0	0	–		4	0
Cardiff City (loan)	2009–10	Championship	16	0	0	0	1	0	3 (Note: Appearances in the Championship play-offs)	0	20	0
Portsmouth	2011–12	Championship	13	1	0	0	0	0	–		13	1
Barnsley	2012–13	Championship	26	0	3	0	1	0	–		30	0
Barnsley	2013–14	Championship	20	0	0	0	1	0	–		21	0
Barnsley	Total		46	0	3	0	2	0	–		51	0
Bury	2014–15	League Two	43	2	2	0	0	0	1 (Note: Appearance in the Football League Trophy)	0	46	2
Bury	2015–16	League One	18	0	4	0	1	0	0	0	23	0
Bury	2016–17	League One	20	2	0	0	1	0	1 (Note: Appearances in the EFL Trophy)	0	22	2
Bury	Total		81	4	6	0	2	0	2	0	91	4
Carlisle United	2017–18	League Two	20	3	2	0	0	0	1	0	23	3
Carlisle United	2018–19	League Two	39	0	1	0	1	0	0	0	41	0
Carlisle United	2019–20	League Two	0	0	0	0	0	0	0	0	0	0
Carlisle United	Total		59	3	3	0	1	0	1	0	64	3
Career total			233	11	13	0	7	0	9	0	262	11
