= Jamie Devitt =

Irish footballer (born 1990)

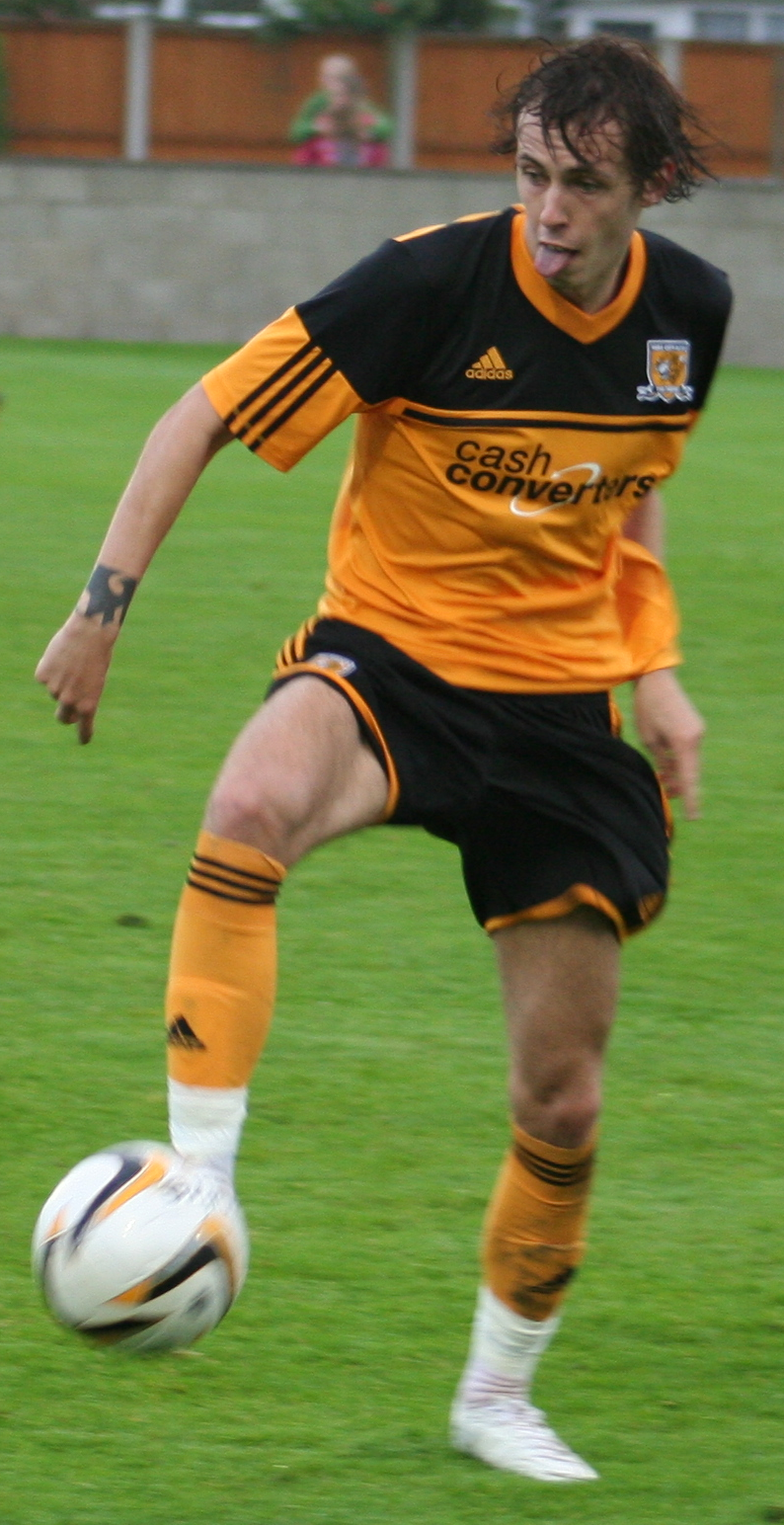
- Devitt playing for Hull City in 2012

Personal information
- Full name: Jamie Martin Devitt
- Date of birth: 6 July 1990 (age 36)
- Place of birth: Dublin, Ireland
- Height: 5 ft 10 in (1.78 m)
- Position: Attacking midfielder

Youth career
- –2008: Hull City

Senior career*
Years	Team	Apps	(Gls)
2008–2013	Hull City	16	(0)
2009	→ Darlington (loan)	6	(1)
2009–2010	→ Shrewsbury Town (loan)	9	(2)
2010	→ Grimsby Town (loan)	15	(5)
2011	→ Bradford City (loan)	7	(1)
2012	→ Accrington Stanley (loan)	16	(2)
2012	→ Rotherham United (loan)	1	(0)
2013	→ Grimsby Town (loan)	14	(2)
2013–2014	Chesterfield	7	(0)
2014	→ Morecambe (loan)	14	(2)
2014–2016	Morecambe	75	(9)
2016–2019	Carlisle United	110	(21)
2019–2021	Blackpool	0	(0)
2019–2020	→ Bradford City (loan)	5	(0)
2020–2021	→ Newport County (loan)	8	(1)
2021–2022	Barrow	21	(1)
2022–2023	Carlisle United	19	(0)
2023–2024	Workington	6	(1)
Total		349	(48)

International career
2011	Republic of Ireland U21	1	(0)
- * Club domestic league appearances and goals

Jamie Martin Devitt (born 6 July 1990) is an Irish former professional footballer who played as an attacking midfielder. He is the Professional Development Phase Coach at Carlisle United.

Beginning his professional career with Hull City he made 16 league appearances over a five-year spell and spent time on loan with Darlington, Shrewsbury Town, Grimsby Town (twice), Bradford City, Accrington Stanley and Rotherham United before permanently joining Chesterfield in 2013. He spent a further loan spell with Morecambe before joining The Shrimps on a permanent contract. In 2016 he signed for Carlisle United where he went on to make 110 league appearances in a three-year spell before moving up the League's to Blackpool. Having failed to make a single appearance he moved on to Newport County, back to Bradford City and then to Barrow before returning to Carlisle in the 2022–23 season, he would drop into non-league for club Workington in 2023–24 before retiring in February 2024 due to injury.

He is a former Republic of Ireland U21 international, having earned 1 cap in 2011.

== Club career ==
=== Hull City ===
Born in Dublin, Devitt progressed through Hull City's youth system and was voted Young Player of the Year and Supporters' Club Player of the Year for the 2007–08 season. In 2009–10 he spent time on loan at three different League Two clubs.

He signed for Darlington on a month's loan on 15 September 2009. He made his debut on 19 September in a 2–0 home defeat to Bournemouth, and scored his first goal for the Quakers in the last game of his loan spell, a 2–1 win against Shrewsbury Town on 17 October.

On 22 October, only days after scoring against the club, he joined Shrewsbury Town on loan. He scored on his debut on 31 October 2009 against Notts County. His form dipped and he was deemed surplus to Shrewsburys promotion battle. He returned to Hull City after being recalled in January 2010.

On 17 February 2010 Devitt joined Grimsby Town on an emergency loan. He scored on his debut in a 1–1 draw against Notts County the same day. Against Grimsby's local rivals Lincoln City at Blundell Park the following Saturday, he picked up the Man of the Match award. Devitt's loan at Grimsby was extended until the end of the season on 24 March, after scoring three goals in seven appearances.

The 2009–10 season was finished off for him with an unwanted hat-trick as he capped three relegations in one season. His parent club Hull City dropped out of the Premier League, while both Darlington and Grimsby Town were also relegated from League Two.

He had a happier start to the 2010–11 season as he made his competitive first-team debut for Hull City by coming on as a substitute in their first match, a 2–0 victory over Swansea on 7 August 2010. Throughout the season, he made 16 appearances for the club. Devitt was on the substitutes bench but came on to set up a goal for Nick Barmby in a 3–2 loss against Wigan in the third round of a FA Cup.

On 31 August 2011 Devitt signed with Bradford City on loan until January 2012. He made his debut for the club in the 1–1 draw at Morecambe on 3 September 2011. He scored in the 3–2 loss at Port Vale on 13 September 2011 and had set up a goal for Ritchie Jones.

On 17 February 2012, joined League Two side Accrington Stanley on an initial one-month loan deal. Devitt made his debut in a 4–0 loss against Plymouth Argyle. One month later, Devitt scored his first goal in a 2–2 draw against Southend United, and the following week he scored another in a 2–1 win over Northampton Town.

On 1 November 2012 Devitt signed an initial one-month loan deal from Rotherham United. However, after only making two appearances in all competitions, he had to return to his parent club due to an injury picked up in a 1–1 draw against Fleetwood Town. On 29 December 2012, amidst speculation Devitt would be re-joining Grimsby Town, Mariners boss Rob Scott distanced himself from the transfer by denying he has intentions to sign him despite previously being interested in the player.

On 1 January 2013 Grimsby announced that they had made an enquiry about Devitt, but were waiting on the player and his agent to decide whether or not they were going to ask Hull for a pay-out if the situation was that he was not in the plans of the club. On 4 January 2013 Devitt re-joined Grimsby Town on loan for the rest of the 2012–13 season. In his second game back for Town he scored the equaliser in a 2–1 away win at Welling United that sent Grimsby into the quarter finals of the FA Trophy. In the quarter-final he opened the scoring with a free kick in Town's 3–0 victory over Luton Town. Town eventually made it through to the final at Wembley Stadium but were beaten by Wrexham on a penalty shootout after the game ended 1–1; Devitt was an unused substitute. In the league, Grimsby dropped off the pace and despite leading the Conference for majority of the season they eventually finished fourth and were defeated by Newport County in the play-offs. Devitt played 15 league matches for Grimsby, scoring two goals.

On 16 May 2013, following Hull's promotion to the Premier League, Devitt was amongst a number of players released by the club. The following day amidst speculation of a return to Grimsby on a permanent deal Mariners joint boss Rob Scott said that Devitt had not done enough in his second spell to warrant a permanent move, and that Grimsby would not be pursuing any interest in Devitt.

=== Chesterfield ===
On 6 July 2013, Devitt played on trial for Chesterfield in the club's 3–0 pre-season victory over Buxton. After featuring two more successful pre-season trials for Chesterfield against Huddersfield Town (in which he scored) and Nottingham Forest, he signed a six-month deal with the club.

On 22 January 2014 Devitt moved on a month-long loan to Morecambe. He made his debut in a 2–2 draw at home to Portsmouth on 25 January 2014.

In May 2014 Jamie Devitt was released by Chesterfield along with three other players.

=== Morecambe ===
On 19 May 2014 Devitt signed for Morecambe on a two-year deal after a successful loan spell at the Globe Arena.

=== Carlisle United ===
On 6 June 2016 Devitt signed for Carlisle United.

He was offered a new contract by Carlisle United at the end of the 2018–19 season.

=== Blackpool ===
On 20 June 2019, Devitt signed for Blackpool on a two-year contract, with the option of a further 12 months. In August 2019 he re-joined Bradford City on loan. His loan expired on 1 May 2020.

Devitt found himself surplus to the plans of new Blackpool head coach Neil Critchley. He was not given a squad number for the 2020–21 season and was asked to look for a new club.

On 16 October 2020, Devitt joined Newport County on loan until January 2021. He made his debut for Newport County as a second-half substitute in the 2–1 League Two win against Harrogate Town on 31 October 2020. He scored his first goal for Newport in the 3–2 League Two defeat against Carlisle United on 3 November 2020.

Devitt and Blackpool mutually terminated his contract on 19 January 2021.

=== Barrow ===
On 19 January 2021, Devitt signed an 18-month contract with Barrow.

=== Return to Carlisle United ===
On 31 January 2022, Devitt returned to Carlisle United on a short-term deal until the end of the season. Devitt was released by the club at the end of the season however would be invited back by the club for pre-season training. On 29 July 2022, Devitt signed a new one-year contract.

On 30 May 2023, after Carlisle won promotion to the EFL League One, manager Paul Simpson said Devitt would be released when his contract expired. One key reason was the player's recurrent fitness problems, he said.

=== Workington ===
On 3 October 2023, Devitt signed for non-league club Workington. In February 2024, due to a season ending thigh injury, Devitt announced his retirement as a player to focus on his coaching career.

== International career ==
In 2011 Devitt was capped by the Republic of Ireland U21 side.

== Career statistics ==
As of match played 6 January 2024

Appearances and goals by club, season and competition
Club	Season	League			FA Cup		League Cup		Other		Total	
Club	Season	Division	Apps	Goals	Apps	Goals	Apps	Goals	Apps	Goals	Apps	Goals
Hull City	2009–10	Premier League	0	0	0	0	0	0	—		0	0
Hull City	2010–11	Championship	16	0	1	0	1	0	—		18	0
Hull City	2011–12	Championship	0	0	0	0	1	0	—		1	0
Hull City	2012–13	Championship	0	0	0	0	0	0	—		1	0
Hull City	Total		16	0	1	0	2	0	—		19	0
Darlington (loan)	2009–10	League Two	6	1	0	0	0	0	1 (Note: Appearance(s) in Football League Trophy)	0	7	1
Shrewsbury Town (loan)	2009–10	League Two	9	2	0	0	0	0	0	0	9	2
Grimsby Town (loan)	2009–10	League Two	15	5	0	0	0	0	0	0	15	5
Bradford City (loan)	2011–12	League Two	7	1	1	0	0	0	1	0	9	1
Accrington Stanley (loan)	2011–12	League Two	16	2	0	0	0	0	0	0	16	2
Rotherham United (loan)	2012–13	League Two	1	0	1	0	0	0	0	0	2	0
Grimsby Town (loan)	2012–13	Conference Premier	14	2	0	0	—		5 (Note: Four appearances and two goals in FA Trophy, one appearance in the Conference Premier play-offs)	2	19	4
Chesterfield	2013–14	League Two	7	0	0	0	0	0	1	0	8	0
Morecambe (loan)	2013–14	League Two	14	2	0	0	0	0	0	0	14	2
Morecambe	2014–15	League Two	36	3	0	0	1	0	1	0	38	3
Morecambe	2015–16	League Two	39	6	2	0	1	0	4	1	46	7
Morecambe	Total		75	9	2	0	2	0	5	1	84	10
Carlisle United	2016–17	League Two	35	0	1	0	1	0	6 (Note: Four appearances in EFL Trophy, two in League Two play-offs)	0	43	0
Carlisle United	2017–18	League Two	40	10	4	0	2	0	3 (Note: Appearance(s) in EFL Trophy)	0	49	10
Carlisle United	2018–19	League Two	35	11	1	1	1	0	1	0	38	12
Carlisle United	Total		110	21	6	1	4	0	10	0	130	22
Blackpool	2019–20	League One	0	0	0	0	0	0	0	0	0	0
Blackpool	2020–21	League One	0	0	0	0	0	0	0	0	0	0
Blackpool	Total		0	0	0	0	0	0	0	0	0	0
Bradford City (loan)	2019–20	League Two	5	0	0	0	0	0	1	0	6	0
Newport County (loan)	2020–21	League Two	8	1	3	1	0	0	0	0	11	2
Barrow	2020–21	League Two	17	1	0	0	0	0	0	0	17	1
Barrow	2021–22	League Two	4	0	1	0	1	0	0	0	6	0
Barrow	Total		21	1	1	0	1	0	0	0	23	1
Carlisle United	2021–22	League Two	7	0	0	0	0	0	0	0	7	0
Carlisle United	2022–23	League Two	12	0	0	0	1	0	1	1	14	1
Carlisle United	Total		19	0	0	0	1	0	1	0	21	0
Workington	2023–24	Northern Premier League	6	1	0	0	0	0	1 (Note: Appearance in FA Trophy)	0	7	1
Career total			349	48	15	2	9	0	26	4	399	54

== Honours ==
Grimsby Town

- FA Trophy runner-up: 2012–13

Chesterfield

- Football League Two: 2013–14

Individual

- Morecambe Supporters' Player of the Year: 2015–16
- Morecambe Players' Player of the Year: 2015–16
