= Hallam Hope =

Barbadian footballer

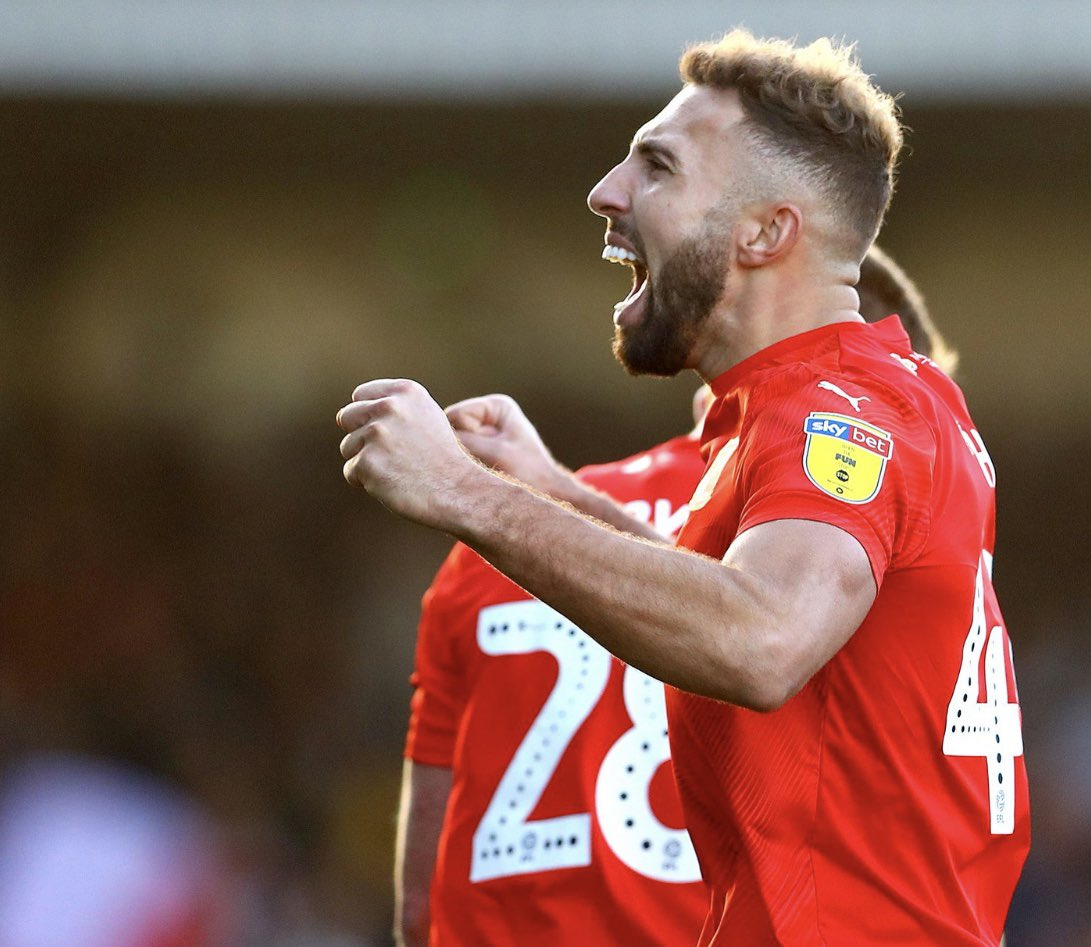
- Hope at Swindon Town during their title winning season.

Personal information
- Full name: Hallam Robert Hope
- Date of birth: 17 March 1994 (age 32)
- Place of birth: Manchester, England
- Height: 1.81 m (5 ft 11 in)
- Position: Forward

Youth career
- 2005–2013: Everton

Senior career*
Years	Team	Apps	(Gls)
2013–2015	Everton	0	(0)
2014	→ Northampton Town (loan)	3	(1)
2014	→ Bury (loan)	8	(5)
2014	→ Sheffield Wednesday (loan)	4	(0)
2014–2015	→ Bury (loan)	4	(0)
2015–2017	Bury	54	(3)
2015–2016	→ Carlisle United (loan)	21	(4)
2017–2020	Carlisle United	104	(25)
2020–2021	Swindon Town	37	(7)
2021–2024	Oldham Athletic	72	(11)
2024–2025	Morecambe	29	(2)
2025–2026	Radcliffe	16	(0)
2026	→ Southport (loan)	11	(0)

International career^{‡}
- England U16
2010–2011	England U17	17	(12)
2011–2012	England U18	2	(2)
2012–2013	England U19	6	(2)
2018–	Barbados	13	(4)
- * Club domestic league appearances and goals as of 19:58, 1 July 2026 (UTC) ‡ National team caps and goals as of 23:47, 16 October 2023 (UTC)

Hallam Robert Hope (born 17 March 1994) is a professional footballer who last played as a forward for Southport FC on loan from Radcliffe FC. Born in England, Hope represents Barbados internationally after representing England up to under-19 level.

He joined the Academy at Everton in 2005. He never played a senior game for the club, though spent brief loan spells at Northampton Town, Bury and Sheffield Wednesday in 2014, before joining Bury permanently in January 2015, who would end the 2014–15 season being promoted out of League Two. He spent most of the 2015–16 season on loan at Carlisle United, and after establishing himself in the Bury first-team during the 2016–17 campaign, he joined Carlisle United on a permanent basis in June 2017. He spent two and a half seasons with the club, before joining Swindon Town in January 2020. Swindon went on to win promotion as champions of League Two at the end of the 2019–20 season, though his appearances were limited as the season was ended in early March.

== Club career ==
=== Everton ===
Hope was spotted playing at a tournament in Manchester at the age of 12 and chose to join Everton after a trial at Manchester City. He signed a full-time scholarship with the club in 2010. He was named as Academy Player of the Season for the 2011–12 campaign. In September 2013, he signed a two-year contract with the club and was given squad number 37.

On 2 January 2014, Hope joined League Two side Northampton Town on a month's loan. He made his debut on 4 January, scoring in a 2–1 win at Newport County. He made a further two appearances for the "Cobblers" before returning to Everton on 30 January.

On 27 March 2014, Hope joined League Two side Bury on loan until the end of the 2013–14 season. He made an immediate impact at Bury, netting a debut goal in a 3–0 win over former club Northampton Town at Sixfields on 29 March. Three days later he scored again in a 2–1 win over Bristol Rovers at Gigg Lane. On 26 April, he scored a hat-trick in a 4–4 draw with Portsmouth. This made him the first Bury player to score a hat-trick since Ian Lawson in 1999.

On 29 August 2014, Hope joined Championship side Sheffield Wednesday on loan until 1 January. He made his debut the next day at Hillsborough, coming on as a substitute for Joe Mattock in the 85th-minute, in a 1–0 loss to Nottingham Forest. He impressed head coach Stuart Gray despite only playing for just over five minutes, who said that "he showed his power and strength and willingness to run at defenders". However, with only four appearances for the "Owls", he returned to Goodison Park on 29 October after being recalled by Everton.

=== Bury ===
On 11 November 2014, Hope returned to Bury on loan until 3 January 2015. Despite not scoring in his seven appearances for Bury that season, he signed permanently for an undisclosed fee (later revealed to be £100,000) on a three-and-a-half-year deal starting at the end of his loan. Manager David Flitcroft said "his potential is frightening and I love working with him". Flitcroft had tried to sign him at the start of the season before Wednesday came in with their loan offer. However Hope struggled despite Bury being in good form – winning automatic promotion at the end of the 2014–15 season – and scored only one goal in his first 32 appearances since joining permanently; Flitcroft tried to accommodate him on the wings before bringing in veteran winger Chris Eagles and stated that Hope "has been a victim of the fine form of Leon Clarke, Tom Pope and Danny Rose".

On 22 October 2015, Hope joined Carlisle United on a one-month loan deal. He made three appearances for the "Cumbrians", scoring in a 2–0 win over Plymouth Argyle on 7 November to take them into the second round of the FA Cup. He picked up an ankle injury during the game and was sidelined for two months, but nevertheless had his loan spell extended until 22 January. Upon his recovery the loan was extended until the end of the 2015–16 season. Carlisle reached the fourth round of the FA Cup, and Hope came on as a half-time substitute as former club Everton recorded a 3–0 victory at Brunton Park. He was sent off for the first time in his career on 16 April, having made a dangerous challenge on Darnell Furlong during a goalless draw at Cambridge United. He scored five goals in 25 games for Carlisle, who felt unable to fund a permanent move for the player.

Hope remained at Bury for the 2016–17 season, scoring five goals in 39 appearances as the club posted a 19th-place finish in League One under the stewardship of Lee Clark.

=== Carlisle United ===
On 29 June 2017, Hope signed a two-year contract with Carlisle United. On joining the club he stated that he hoped to play at centre-forward, but would be happy to play in other positions if required to do so. Manager Keith Curle spoke of his previous efforts to sign Hope and joked that "I've probably chased Hallam more than I've ever chased anyone else through my whole life – ex-wife, ex-partner and current girlfriend included!" However Hope struggled at centre-forward and received criticism from "Blues" supporters, though by March had regained confidence and form playing as a left-sided attacking midfielder. He ended the 2017–18 season with 18 goals in 49 appearances, finishing as the club's top-scorer. He was set a target of 15 goals for the 2018–19 season, with assistant manager Tommy Wright describing him as "one of the best attacking players in this division". He was shortlisted for the League Two Player of the Month award after scoring three goals and claiming an assist as the club rose up the League Two table in January. He signed a contract extension in March to keep him at Carlisle until 2020. He achieved his target, scoring 15 goals in 44 games to become the club's top-scorer for the second successive season.

The club turned down a transfer bid from an unnamed club for Hope in August 2019. The club was speculated to be League One club Blackpool, though this was disputed after manager Terry McPhillips was replaced by Simon Grayson. Carlisle manager Steven Pressley suggested that the player's "head has been turned" by transfer speculation but defended him after fans began to jeer Hope following a downturn in performances. He further backed the player in October after Hope rejected a call-up from Barbados to instead play for Carlisle. Upon Hope's departure from Carlisle, manager Chris Beech said that "he's been superb for me from the moment I came through the door" but that his sale represented a "good deal for the club".

=== Swindon Town ===
Hope joined Swindon Town for an undisclosed fee on 22 January 2020, signing an 18-month contract. He had been a target for "Robins" manager Richie Wellens at the start of the season, who was in desperate need of a striker after loanees Jerry Yates and top-scorer Eoin Doyle were both recalled to their parent clubs. Three days later he scored on his debut at the County Ground, as Swindon recorded a 3–0 victory over Port Vale. He scored a total of two goals from five games before the 2019–20 season was ended early due to the COVID-19 pandemic in England, with Swindon being promoted as champions after the league table was settled on a points per game basis.

On 14 May 2021, it was announced that he would leave Swindon at the end of the season, following the expiry of his contract.

=== Oldham Athletic ===
Hope joined Oldham Athletic on a free transfer on 22 June 2021, signing a one-year contract. He remained for another year after Oldham dropped down to the National League for the first time.

He departed the club at the end of the 2023–24 season upon the expiration of his contract.

=== Morecambe ===
Hope was one of 15 free agents that signed for League Two club Morecambe on 12 July 2024, after the club's embargo on registering new players was lifted.

== International career ==
Hope represented England at under-16 (two goals in seven games), under-17 (12 goals in 17 games), under-18 (two goals in two games) and under-19 level (two goals in six games). He was in England's squads for the 2011 FIFA U-17 World Cup, 2011 UEFA European Under-17 Championship and 2012 UEFA European Under-19 Championship.

He was also eligible to represent Barbados through his father, Russell, who emigrated to England before Hope was born. His paternal grandfather hails from Trinidad and Tobago. He accepted a call up from Barbados and made his senior international debut on 5 September 2018, scoring both his nation's goals in a 2–2 draw with Guyana in a CONCACAF Nations League qualifying game. In December 2018, CONCACAF declared Hope ineligible to represent Barbados, wiping his two appearances and two goals. However, Hope returned to international duty and on 19 November 2019 he scored twice in a 3–0 victory over the Cayman Islands to secure promotion for Barbados into League B of the CONCACAF Nations League.

== Style of play ==
Hope can play as a forward or winger, though is primarily utilised on the left-side of an attacking three. David Flitcroft, former Bury manager, was a big fan of Hope and in January 2015 said that "he adds power, speed, strength and potency to our squad". Carlisle first-team coach Paul Murray praised his work rate in training and said that "Hallam is quiet but he leads by example". Carlisle's assistant manager Tommy Wright said that "he's direct and he isn't frightened to run with the ball. If it goes wrong for him he gets the ball and tries again". He has been praised for his finishing skills, movement and aerial threat but has been crtiicised for a lack of aggression, work rate and left-foot ability.

== Career statistics ==
=== Club ===
As of end of 2023–24 season

Appearances and goals by club, season and competition
Club	Season	League			FA Cup		EFL Cup		Other		Total	
Club	Season	Division	Apps	Goals	Apps	Goals	Apps	Goals	Apps	Goals	Apps	Goals
Everton	2013–14	Premier League	0	0	0	0	0	0	—		0	0
Everton	2014–15	Premier League	0	0	0	0	0	0	—		0	0
Everton	Total		0	0	0	0	0	0	0	0	0	0
Northampton Town (loan)	2013–14	League Two	3	1	0	0	0	0	0	0	3	1
Bury (loan)	2013–14	League Two	8	5	0	0	0	0	0	0	8	5
Sheffield Wednesday (loan)	2014–15	Championship	4	0	0	0	0	0	—		4	0
Bury (loan)	2014–15	League Two	4	0	2	0	0	0	1 (Note: Appearances in Football League Trophy)	0	7	0
Bury	2014–15	League Two	15	0	0	0	0	0	0	0	15	0
Bury	2015–16	League One	6	0	0	0	2	0	2	1	10	1
Bury	2016–17	League One	33	3	2	2	1	0	3 (Note: Appearances in EFL Trophy)	0	39	5
Bury	Total		58	3	4	2	3	0	6	1	71	6
Carlisle United (loan)	2015–16	League Two	21	4	4	1	0	0	0	0	25	5
Carlisle United	2017–18	League Two	41	9	5	3	2	0	1	1	49	13
Carlisle United	2018–19	League Two	40	14	2	0	1	1	1	0	44	15
Carlisle United	2019–20	League Two	23	2	4	0	2	0	1	1	30	3
Carlisle United	Total		104	25	11	3	5	1	3	2	123	31
Swindon Town	2019–20	League Two	5	2	0	0	0	0	0	0	5	2
Swindon Town	2020–21	League One	32	5	1	0	1	0	2	0	36	5
Swindon Town	Total		37	7	1	0	1	0	2	0	41	7
Oldham Athletic	2021–22	League Two	39	5	2	0	1	0	4	0	46	5
Oldham Athletic	2022–23	National League	16	3	1	0	—		1 (Note: Appearance(s) in FA Trophy)	0	18	3
Oldham Athletic	2023–24	National League	17	3	1	0	—		2	1	20	4
Oldham Athletic	Total		72	11	4	0	1	0	7	1	84	12
Career total			307	56	24	6	10	1	18	4	359	67

=== International ===
Appearances and goals by national team and year
National team	Year	Apps	Goals
Barbados	2018	2	2
Barbados	2019	4	2
Barbados	2021	3	0
Barbados	2023	4	0
Total		13	4

Scores and results list Australia's goal tally first, score column indicates score after each Luongo goal.

List of international goals scored by Massimo Luongo
No.	Date	Venue	Opponent	Score	Result	Competition	Ref.
1	6 September 2018	Synthetic Track and Field Facility, Leonora, Guyana	Guyana	1–1	2–2	2019–20 CONCACAF Nations League qualifying	
2	6 September 2018	Synthetic Track and Field Facility, Leonora, Guyana	Guyana	2–1	2–2	2019–20 CONCACAF Nations League qualifying	
3	19 November 2019	Wildey Turf, Bridgetown, Barbados	Cayman Islands	1–0	3–0	2019–20 CONCACAF Nations League C	
4	19 November 2019	Wildey Turf, Bridgetown, Barbados	Cayman Islands	3–0	3–0	2019–20 CONCACAF Nations League C	

== Honours ==
Bury

- Football League Two third-place promotion: 2014–15

Swindon Town

- EFL League Two: 2019–20
