= Ashley Nadesan =

English footballer

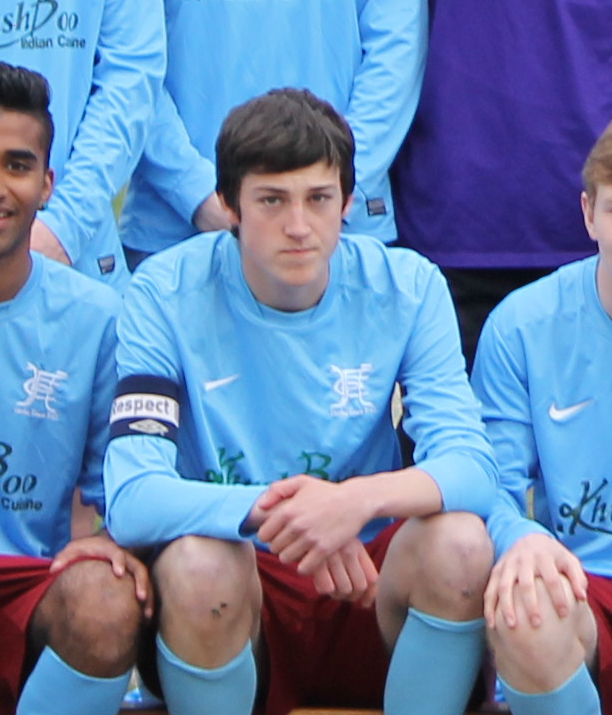
- Nadesan with Horley Town in 2013

Personal information
- Full name: Ashley Kevin Nadesan
- Date of birth: 9 September 1994 (age 32)
- Place of birth: Redhill, England
- Height: 6 ft 2 in (1.88 m)
- Position: Striker

Team information
- Current team: Horsham
- Number: 10

Youth career
- 2012–2013: Horley Town

Senior career*
Years	Team	Apps	(Gls)
2013–2016	Horley Town		
2016–2019	Fleetwood Town	21	(1)
2018	→ Carlisle United (loan)	15	(4)
2018–2019	→ Carlisle United (loan)	25	(8)
2019–2023	Crawley Town	146	(26)
2023–2025	Gillingham	29	(2)
2024–2025	→ Sutton United (loan)	42	(8)
2025–2026	Sutton United	28	(3)
2026	→ Worthing (loan)	9	(1)
2026–	Horsham	15	(1)
- * Club domestic league appearances and goals as of 08:18, 1 November 2026 (UTC)

Ashley Kevin Nadesan (born 9 September 1994) is an English professional footballer who plays as a striker for National League South side Horsham.

== Career ==
=== Horley Town ===
Born in Redhill, Surrey, He began his career at Combined Counties club Horley Town, leading their Youth side in both league and cup in the 2012–13 season, sometimes playing at centre-back. He graduated to the first team at Horley, and became a regular starter. He came to the notice of professional clubs towards the end of the 2014–15 season having scored a total of 99 goals for Horley in league and cup in the previous two seasons. Nadesan was also the Combined Counties top scorer for the 2015–16 season, scoring 45 goals in the Premier Division, having finished runner-up the previous season.

=== Fleetwood Town ===
He joined Fleetwood in July 2016 for an undisclosed sum, before making his Football League debut for Fleetwood in August 2017 against AFC Wimbledon.

He moved on loan to Carlisle United in January 2018. At the end of the 2017–18 season, Fleetwood exercised an option to extend Nadesan's contract by one year. He returned on loan to Carlisle United in August 2018.

=== Crawley Town ===
In May 2019 he moved to Crawley Town on a free transfer, signing a three-year contract. However, Nadesan missed much of the pre-season through an ankle injury. Nadesan made his Crawley debut on 13 August 2019, playing the first 60 minutes of a 3–2 EFL Cup win over Walsall, in which he scored and gained an assist. He scored his first league goal for Crawley on 29 December 2019; a right-footed equaliser in the 37th minute of a 1–1 draw at Grimsby Town. He appeared in 25 league matches during the 2019–20 season, and scored 5 goals.

Nadesan scored Crawley's second goal of a 3–0 FA Cup third round win over Premier League side Leeds United on 10 January 2021.

In June 2022 he signed a two-year contract with the club.

=== Gillingham ===
In July 2023 he signed for League Two side Gillingham for an undisclosed fee. He made his debut on 8 August 2023 against Championship side Southampton, scoring the first goal in a 3–1 First Round EFL Cup victory. On 15 May 2024, the club put him on the transfer list.

=== Sutton United ===
On 2 August 2024, Nadesan joined National League side Sutton United on a season long loan. After being released by Gillingham, he signed for Sutton on a permanent contract in July 2025. On 13 March 2026, he joined Worthing on loan for the remainder of the season.

=== Horsham ===
On 11 June 2026, Nadesan signed for National League South side Horsham. On 18 August 2026, he scored his first goal for Horsham, in a 2-0 victory over Hampton & Richmond

== Style of play ==
Due to his goal-scoring ability, Nadesan has been compared to England international and fellow former Fleetwood Town forward Jamie Vardy. Knaphill manager Keith Hills said of him, "there's something about the way he plays, his ability and how he reads the game. He obviously scores goals and he's very quick and combines speed with agility."

== Career statistics ==
As of match played 14 November 2026

Appearances and goals by club, season and competition
Club	Season	League			FA Cup		League Cup		Other		Total	
Club	Season	Division	Apps	Goals	Apps	Goals	Apps	Goals	Apps	Goals	Apps	Goals
Fleetwood Town	2016–17	League One	0	0	0	0	0	0	0	0	0	0
Fleetwood Town	2017–18	League One	1	0	0	0	0	0	3 (Note: Appearance(s) in EFL Trophy.)	0	4	0
Fleetwood Town	2018–19	League One	20	1	0	0	0	0	0	0	20	1
Fleetwood Town	Total		21	1	0	0	0	0	3	0	24	1
Carlisle United (loan)	2017–18	League Two	15	4	0	0	0	0	0	0	15	4
Carlisle United (loan)	2018–19	League Two	25	8	0	0	0	0	3	1	28	9
Crawley Town	2019–20	League Two	25	5	2	1	2	1	1	0	30	7
Crawley Town	2020–21	League Two	40	5	4	3	1	0	1	0	46	8
Crawley Town	2021–22	League Two	39	9	1	0	1	0	1	0	42	9
Crawley Town	2022–23	League Two	42	7	1	0	3	0	2	0	46	7
Crawley Town	Total		146	26	8	4	7	1	5	0	166	31
Gillingham	2023–24	League Two	29	2	2	0	2	1	1	0	34	3
Sutton United (loan)	2024–25	National League	43	8	1	0	0	0	0	0	44	8
Sutton United	2025–26	National League	28	3	2	0	0	0	0	0	30	3
Sutton United	Total		71	11	3	0	0	0	0	0	74	11
Worthing (loan)	2025–26	National League South	9	1	0	0	0	0	0	0	9	1
Horsham	2026–27	National League South	15	1	2	0	0	0	3	3	20	4
Career total			330	54	15	4	9	2	15	4	369	64
