= George Glendon =

English footballer

Personal information
- Full name: George Glendon
- Date of birth: 3 May 1995 (age 31)
- Place of birth: Manchester, England
- Height: 1.77 m (5 ft 9 1/2 in)
- Position: Midfielder

Team information
- Current team: Bury

Youth career
- Manchester City

Senior career*
Years	Team	Apps	(Gls)
2016–2017	Manchester City	0	(0)
2016–2017	→ Fleetwood Town (loan)	9	(0)
2017–2018	Fleetwood Town	47	(0)
2018–2019	Carlisle United	16	(0)
2019–2025	Chester	133	(21)
2025–2026	Radcliffe	46	(2)
2026–	Bury	0	(0)

International career^{‡}
2011	England U16	1	(0)
2011	England U17	4	(0)
- * Club domestic league appearances and goals as of 19:45, 13 May 2026 (UTC) ‡ National team caps and goals as of 19:12, 22 August 2016 (UTC)

George Glendon (born 3 May 1995) is an English professional footballer who plays as a midfielder for Northern Premier League Premier Division club Bury.

== Early and personal life ==
He is the son of former professional footballer Kevin Glendon.

== Club career ==
=== Manchester City ===
He began his career at Manchester City, where he was captain of their Elite Development Squad.

=== Fleetwood Town ===
He signed on loan for Fleetwood Town in August 2016, with the deal becoming permanent in January 2017. Glendon was cleared of rape in January 2018.

Glendon was released by Fleetwood at the end of the 2017–18 season.

=== Carlisle United ===
Glendon joined Carlisle United in July 2018 after signing a one-year contract. He scored his first professional goal in a 3–2 EFL Trophy win over Morecambe on 4 September 2018.

He was released by Carlisle at the end of the 2018–19 season.

=== Chester ===
In August 2019 he joined Chester on a short-term deal. On 8 February 2021, Glendon was awarded the Player of the Month award for the league for January 2021. He became club captain, and signed a new contract with the club in May 2022.

In September 2022 he returned to the first-team following injury. In September 2023 he made his 100th appearance for the club.

=== Radcliffe ===
On 24 January 2025, Glendon signed for fellow National League North side Radcliffe on a deal until the end of the season with the option for a further year.

=== Bury ===
On 13 May 2026, Glendon joined newly promoted Northern Premier League Premier Division club Bury.

== International career ==
He represented England at youth international level, and he was called up to the Wales under-21 team in March 2015.

== Personal life ==
Glendon was cleared of rape in January 2018.

== Career statistics ==
As of end of 2025–26 season

Appearances and goals by club, season and competition
Club	Season	League			FA Cup		League Cup		Other		Total	
Club	Season	Division	Apps	Goals	Apps	Goals	Apps	Goals	Apps	Goals	Apps	Goals
Manchester City	2016–17	Premier League	0	0	0	0	0	0	0	0	0	0
Fleetwood Town (loan)	2016–17	League One	9	0	4	0	0	0	3 (Note: Appearance(s) in EFL Trophy)	0	16	0
Fleetwood Town	2016–17	League One	17	0	0	0	0	0	2 (Note: Appearance(s) in League One play-offs)	0	19	0
Fleetwood Town	2017–18	League One	30	0	5	0	0	0	1	0	36	0
Fleetwood Town	Total		56	0	9	0	0	0	6	0	71	0
Carlisle United	2018–19	League Two	16	0	0	0	0	0	3	1	19	1
Chester	2019–20	National League North	23	2	2	0	—		6 (Note: Four appearances in FA Trophy, one appearance in Cheshire Senior Cup, one appearance and one goal in National League North play-offs)	1	31	3
Chester	2020–21	National League North	17	3	3	0	—		1 (Note: Appearance(s) in FA Trophy)	0	21	3
Chester	2021–22	National League North	35	4	3	0	—		2 (Note: One appearance in FA Trophy, one appearance in Cheshire Senior Cup)	0	40	4
Chester	2022–23	National League North	0	0	0	0	—		0	0	0	0
Chester	2023–24	National League North	42	12	5	1	—		0	0	47	13
Chester	2024–25	National League North	16	0	4	1	—		0	0	20	1
Chester	Total		133	21	17	2	—		9	1	159	24
Radcliffe	2024–25	National League North	20	2	—		—		0	0	20	2
Radcliffe	2025–26	National League North	26	0	1	0	—		2	0	29	0
Radcliffe	Total		46	2	1	0	0	0	2	0	49	2
Career total			251	23	27	2	0	0	20	2	298	27

== Honours ==
Individual

- National League North Player of the Month: January 2021
