= Max Brown (footballer) =

English footballer

Personal information
- Date of birth: 29 March 1999 (age 27)
- Position: Striker

Team information
- Current team: Penrith

Youth career
- Carlisle United

Senior career*
Years	Team	Apps	(Gls)
2018–2019	Carlisle United	1	(0)
2018	→ Workington (loan)		
2018	→ Workington (loan)		
2018	→ Kendal Town (loan)		
2019–	Penrith		
- * Club domestic league appearances and goals as of 16:20, 23 July 2020 (UTC)

Max Brown (born 29 March 1999) is an English professional footballer who plays for Penrith as a striker.

== Career ==
He turned professional in May 2018, alongside Sam Adewusi and Kieron Olsen. He spent two loan spells at Workington, one at the end of the 2017–18 season and one at the start of the 2018–19 season. He moved on loan to Kendal Town in November 2018, alongside Olsen. In December 2018 the loan was extended for a further month.

On 1 February 2019, Brown was one of four young professionals to leave Carlisle by mutual consent. He later signed for Penrith.
