= Jordan Holt (footballer, born 2000) =

English footballer

Personal information
- Full name: Jordan Holt
- Date of birth: 17 March 2000 (age 26)
- Place of birth: Carlisle, England
- Height: 1.75 m (5 ft 9 in)
- Position: Midfielder

Team information
- Current team: Gretna 2008

Youth career
- –2016: Carlisle United

Senior career*
Years	Team	Apps	(Gls)
2016–2019	Carlisle United	0	(0)
2017–2018	→ Workington (loan)	25	(2)
2018	→ Workington (loan)	6	(1)
2019	Workington	14	(0)
2019–2020	Annan Athletic	17	(1)
2020–2021	Workington		
2021–2024	Carlisle City		
2024–	Gretna 2008	0	(0)
- * Club domestic league appearances and goals as of 13:31, 15 June 2024 (UTC)

Jordan Holt (born 17 March 2000) is an English professional footballer who plays as a midfielder for Lowland League West club Gretna 2008.

== Club career ==
=== Carlisle United ===
Born in Carlisle, Holt joined Carlisle United at a young age and went onto make his first-team debut during their EFL Trophy tie against Fleetwood Town in November 2016, featuring for 28 minutes in the 4–2 victory.

Following his debut campaign, Holt agreed to join Northern Premier League side, Workington on loan in August 2017. Making his debut in that month in a 0–0 draw with Stafford Rangers, Holt went onto impress significantly, featuring thirty-five times for the Reds, scoring twice. Proceeding a six-month contract extension with Carlisle, Holt returned to Workington in August 2018 on a one-month loan. He departed the club in January 2019.

=== Later career ===
In July 2019, Holt joined Scottish League Two club Annan Athletic.

In July 2021, Holt joined Northern Football League Division Two side Carlisle City. His first season with the club ended in success as they were promoted to the Northern League Division One as champions, being named Players' Player of the Year.

On 6 June 2024, Holt signed for Lowland League club Gretna 2008.

== Career statistics ==
As of match played 18 August 2018.

Club	Season	League			FA Cup		League Cup		Other		Total	
Club	Season	Division	Apps	Goals	Apps	Goals	Apps	Goals	Apps	Goals	Apps	Goals
Carlisle United	2016–17	League Two	0	0	0	0	0	0	1 (Note: Appearance(s) in EFL Trophy)	0	1	0
Carlisle United	2017–18	League Two	0	0	0	0	0	0	0	0	0	0
Workington (loan)	2017–18	Northern Premier League Premier Division	25	2	1	0	—		8 (Note: Two appearances in Northern Premier League Challenge Cup, six in FA Trophy)	0	34	2
Workington (loan)	2018–19	Northern Premier League Premier Division	1	0	0	0	—		0	0	1	0
Workington (loan)	Total		26	2	1	0	—		8	0	35	2
Career total			26	2	1	0	0	0	9	0	36	2
