= Jack Egan (footballer) =

English footballer

Personal information
- Date of birth: 16 October 1998 (age 28)
- Position: Midfielder

Senior career*
Years	Team	Apps	(Gls)
2017–2019	Carlisle United	0	(0)
2017	→ Workington (loan)		
2018	→ Clitheroe (loan)		
- * Club domestic league appearances and goals as of 11:02, 25 October 2018 (UTC)

Jack Egan (born 16 October 1998) is an English professional footballer who plays as a midfielder.

== Career ==
After beginning his career at Carlisle United, he moved on loan to Workington in September 2017, and to Clitheroe in February 2018. On 1 February 2019, Brown was one of four young professionals to leave Carlisle by mutual consent.
