= 2016–17 Carlisle United F.C. season =

Carlisle United
2016–17 season
- Chairman: Andrew Jenkins
- Manager: Keith Curle
- Stadium: Brunton Park
- League Two: 6th
- FA Cup: Second round (eliminated by Rochdale)
- EFL Cup: Second round (eliminated by Derby County)
- EFL Trophy: Second round (eliminated by Mansfield Town)
- Top goalscorer: League: Charlie Wyke (14); All: Charlie Wyke (18)
- Highest home attendance: 9,708 vs Exeter City, 14 May 2017
- Lowest home attendance: 1,126 vs Mansfield Town, 6 December 2016
Home colours	Away colours	Third colours

The 2016–17 season was Carlisle United's 112th season in their history and their third consecutive season in League Two. The season covered the period from 1 July 2016 to 30 June 2017, with competitive matches played between August and May. Along with League Two, the club also participated in the FA Cup, League Cup and League Trophy. Carlisle finished in sixth place, qualifying for the play-offs, where they were defeated by Exeter City in the semi-finals, with a score of 6–5 on aggregate.

== Squad statistics ==
As of 23 April 2017

No.	Pos	Nat	Player	Total		League Two		FA Cup		League Cup		Ch. Trophy	
No.	Pos	Nat	Player	Apps	Goals	Apps	Goals	Apps	Goals	Apps	Goals	Apps	Goals
1	GK	(England) ENG	Mark Gillespie	50	0	46	0	2	0	2	0	0	0
2	DF	(England) ENG	Joe Ward	0	0	0	0	0	0	0	0	0	0
2	DF	(England) ENG	David Atkinson (released)	2	0	1	0	0	0	1	0	0	0
3	DF	(England) ENG	Danny Grainger	37	7	29	4	2	1	2	0	4	2
4	MF	(England) ENG	Luke Joyce	48	1	40	1	2	0	2	0	4	0
5	DF	(England) ENG	Michael Raynes	42	3	37	2	2	0	2	0	1	1
6	DF	(England) ENG	Mark Ellis (out on loan)	12	0	7	0	1	0	2	0	2	0
7	MF	(England) ENG	Jason Kennedy	32	11	28	10	2	1	1	0	1	0
8	MF	(England) ENG	Mike Jones	33	1	28	0	2	0	2	1	1	0
9	FW	(England) ENG	Jamie Proctor	15	3	15	3	0	0	0	0	0	0
9	FW	(England) ENG	Charlie Wyke (sold)	34	18	26	14	2	0	2	1	4	3
10	MF	(Wales) WAL	Nicky Adams	43	2	39	2	2	0	2	0	0	0
11	FW	(Ghana) GHA	Derek Asamoah (released)	11	0	8	0	1	0	0	0	2	0
12	MF	(England) ENG	Macaulay Gillesphey (loan)	34	0	30	0	0	0	1	0	3	0
13	FW	(England) ENG	Ben Tomlinson	2	0	2	0	0	0	0	0	0	0
14	FW	(England) ENG	Jabo Ibehre	40	13	37	11	1	2	1	0	1	0
15	DF	(England) ENG	Shaun Brisley	34	2	28	2	2	0	0	0	4	0
16	FW	(England) ENG	James Bailey	10	1	10	1	0	0	0	0	0	0
16	FW	(England) ENG	Russell Penn (released)	2	0	1	0	0	0	0	0	1	0
17	MF	(Republic of Ireland) IRL	Jamie Devitt	38	0	33	0	0	0	1	0	4	0
18	MF	(Scotland) SCO	Joe McKee (released)	9	1	4	0	1	0	1	0	3	1
18	MF	(Republic of Ireland) IRL	John O'Sullivan	16	1	16	1	0	0	0	0	0	0
19	MF	(Bermuda) BER	Reggie Lambe	43	8	37	6	1	1	1	0	4	1
20	FW	(England) ENG	Shaun Miller	35	7	28	4	2	0	2	1	3	2
21	DF	(England) ENG	Patrick Brough (out on loan)	2	0	1	0	0	0	0	0	1	0
22	GK	(New Zealand) NZL	Max Crocombe	4	0	0	0	0	0	0	0	4	0
23	DF	(England) ENG	Tom Miller	47	1	39	0	2	0	2	0	4	1
24	FW	(England) ENG	Cameron Salkeld	2	1	0	0	0	0	0	0	2	1
25	DF	(Wales) WAL	Jordan Holt	1	0	0	0	0	0	0	0	1	0
26	FW	(England) ENG	James Hooper	1	0	1	0	0	0	0	0	0	0
26	MF	(England) ENG	Kevin Wright (released)	3	0	2	0	0	0	0	0	1	0
27	MF	(England) ENG	George Waring	9	0	9	0	0	0	0	0	0	0
28	MF	(England) ENG	Gary Liddle	19	1	19	1	0	0	0	0	0	0
29	FW	(France) FRA	Jean-Michel Joachim	2	0	2	0	0	0	0	0	0	0
30	GK	(England) ENG	Morgan Bacon	0	0	0	0	0	0	0	0	0	0
39	MF	(England) ENG	Samir Nabi	1	0	1	0	0	0	0	0	0	0
44	DF	(England) ENG	Alexander McQueen	5	0	4	0	0	0	0	0	1	0

=== Top scorers ===
Place	Position	Nation	Number	Name	League Two	FA Cup	League Cup	Ch. Trophy	Total
1	FW	(England)	9	Charlie Wyke	14	0	1	3	18
2	MF	(England)	7	Jason Kennedy	10	1	0	0	11
3	FW	(England)	14	Jabo Ibehre	7	2	0	0	9
4	DF	(England)	3	Danny Grainger	4	1	0	2	7
4	FW	(England)	20	Shaun Miller	4	0	1	2	7
6	FW	(Bermuda)	19	Reggie Lambe	4	1	0	1	6
7	DF	(England)	5	Michael Raynes	2	0	0	1	3
8	MF	(Wales)	10	Nicky Adams	2	0	0	0	2
8	MF	(England)	15	Shaun Brisley	2	0	0	0	2
8	FW	(England)	9	Jamie Proctor	2	0	0	0	2
11	DF	(England)	4	Luke Joyce	1	0	0	0	1
11	MF	(England)	8	Mike Jones	0	0	1	0	1
11	DF	(England)	28	Gary Liddle	1	0	0	0	1
11	DF	(Scotland)	19	Joe McKee	0	0	0	1	1
11	DF	(England)	23	Tom Miller	0	0	0	1	1
11	FW	(England)	24	Cameron Salkeld	0	0	0	1	1
Own goals					3	0	0	1	4
				TOTALS	56	5	3	13	77

=== Disciplinary record ===
Number	Nation	Position	Name	League Two		FA Cup		League Cup		Ch. Trophy		Total	
Number	Nation	Position	Name	Yellow card	Red card	Yellow card	Red card	Yellow card	Red card	Yellow card	Red card	Yellow card	Red card
17	(Republic of Ireland)	MF	Jamie Devitt	0	2	0	0	0	0	0	0	0	2
5	(England)	DF	Michael Raynes	6	1^{(10)}	1	0	0	0	0	0	7	1
16	(England)	DF	James Bailey	0	1	0	0	0	0	0	0	0	1
20	(England)	FW	Shaun Miller	2	2	1	0	0	0	1	0	4	1
9	(England)	FW	Jamie Proctor	3	1	0	0	0	0	0	0	2	1
12	(England)	MF	Macaulay Gillesphey	1	0	0	0	0	0	0	1	1	1
4	(England)	DF	Luke Joyce	7	0	0	0	0	0	1	0	8	0
15	(England)	DF	Shaun Brisley	6	0	0	0	0	0	0	0	6	0
23	(England)	DF	Tom Miller	5	0	0	0	0	0	1	0	6	0
3	(England)	DF	Danny Grainger	4	0	0	0	1	0	0	0	5	0
14	(England)	FW	Jabo Ibehre	5	0	0	0	0	0	0	0	5	0
8	(England)	MF	Mike Jones	4	0	0	0	0	0	0	0	4	0
7	(England)	MF	Jason Kennedy	4	0	0	0	0	0	0	0	4	0
1	(England)	GK	Mark Gillespie	3	0	0	0	0	0	0	0	3	0
10	(Wales)	MF	Nicky Adams	2	0	0	0	0	0	0	0	2	0
19	(Bermuda)	MF	Reggie Lambe	2	0	0	0	0	0	0	0	2	0
28	(England)	MF	Gary Liddle	2	0	0	0	0	0	0	0	2	0
18	(England)	MF	John O'Sullivan	2	0	0	0	0	0	0	0	2	0
17	(England)	MF	Jamie Devitt	1	0	0	0	0	0	0	0	1	0
6	(England)	DF	Mark Ellis	1	0	0	0	0	0	0	0	1	0
44	(England)	DF	Alexander McQueen	1	0	0	0	0	0				
			TOTALS	53	6	2	0	1	0	3	1	59	7

Notes:

- ^(10) The red card that Michael Raynes received in the Round 20 match against Luton Town was rescinded by the FA Appeal Board after the club appealed.

== Transfers ==
=== Transfers in ===
Date from	Position	Nationality	Name	From	Fee	Ref.
1 July	RM	(Wales)	Nicky Adams	(England) Northampton Town	Free transfer	
1 July	RM	(Republic of Ireland)	Jamie Devitt	(England) Morecambe	Free transfer	
1 July	RM	(England)	Mike Jones	(England) Oldham Athletic	Free transfer	
1 July	RM	(Bermuda)	Reggie Lambe	(England) Mansfield Town	Free transfer	
1 July	AM	(Scotland)	Joe McKee	(Scotland) Greenock Morton	Undisclosed	
1 July	CF	(England)	Shaun Miller	(England) Morecambe	Free transfer	
1 July	CM	(England)	Russell Penn	(England) York City	Free transfer	
4 July	CB	(England)	Shaun Brisley	(England) Peterborough United	Free transfer	
4 August	GK	(New Zealand)	Max Crocombe	(England) Oxford United	Free transfer	
14 October	SS	(Ghana)	Derek Asamoah	Unattached	Free transfer	
1 December	RB	(England)	Alexander McQueen	Unattached	Free transfer	
1 December	LB	(England)	Kevin Wright	(England) Chelsea	Free transfer	
13 January	RM	(England)	Gary Liddle	(England) Chesterfield	Free transfer	
30 January	RM	(Republic of Ireland)	John O'Sullivan	(England) Blackburn Rovers	Free transfer	
3 February	MF	(England)	James Bailey	(Canada) Ottawa Fury	Free transfer	
14 March	MF	(England)	James Hooper	(England) Rochdale	Free transfer	
14 March	MF	(England)	Joe Ward	(England) West Bromwich	Free transfer	
18 March	CF	(France)	Jean-Michel Joachim	Unattached	Free transfer	
24 March	CM	(England)	Samir Nabi	(England) West Bromwich Albion	Free transfer	
24 March	CF	(England)	Ben Tomlinson	(England) Barnet	Free transfer	

=== Transfers out ===
Date from	Position	Nationality	Name	To	Fee	Ref.
1 July	CB	(England)	Troy Archibald-Henville	(England) Exeter City (Note: Following Archibald-Henville's release, he signed for Exeter City.)	Released	
1 July	SS	(Ghana)	Derek Asamoah	(England) Carlisle United (Note: Following Asamoah's release, he re-joined the club in October.)	Released	
1 July	LW	(Colombia)	Ángelo Balanta	(England) Boreham Wood (Note: Following Balanta's release, he signed for Boreham Wood.)	Released	
1 July	RM	(England)	Arron Bradbury	(Scotland) Annan Athletic (Note: Following Bradbury's release, he signed for Annan Athletic.)	Released	
1 July	GK	(Wales)	Dan Hanford	(England) Gateshead (Note: Following Hanford's release, he signed for Gateshead.)	Released	
1 July	CM	(France)	Bastien Héry	(England) Accrington Stanley (Note: Following Héry's release, he signed for Accrington Stanley.)	Released	
1 July	RW	(Netherlands)	Luís Pedro	(Netherlands) MVV Maastricht (Note: Following Pedro's release, he signed for MVV Maastricht.)	Released	
1 July	AM	(England)	Steven Rigg	(Scotland) Queen of the South (Note: Following Rigg's release, he signed for Queen of the South.)	Released	
1 July	CM	(England)	Antony Sweeney	(England) Gateshead (Note: Following Sweeney's release, he signed for Gateshead.)	Released	
1 July	RM	(England)	Joe Thompson	(England) Rochdale (Note: Following Thompson's release, he signed for Rochdale.)	Released	
15 August	CB	(England)	Alexander McQueen	(England) Carlisle United F.C. (Note: On 1 December 2016, McQueen rejoined the club on a short-term deal.)	Released	
16 January	SS	(Ghana)	Derek Asamoah	(England) Guiseley (Note: Following Asamoah's release, he signed for Guiseley.)	Released	
19 January	DF	(England)	David Atkinson	(England) Blyth Spartans (Note: Following Atkinson's release, he signed for Blyth Spartans.)	Released	
19 January	MF	(England)	Kevin Wright	(Norway) Fredrikstad FK (Note: Following Wright's release, he signed for Fredrikstad.)	Released	
31 January	CF	(England)	Charlie Wyke	(England) Bradford City	Undisclosed	
31 January	MF	(Scotland)	Joe McKee	(Scotland) Falkirk (Note: Following McKee's release, he signed for Falkirk.)	Released	

=== Loans in ===
Date from	Position	Nationality	Name	From	Date until	Ref.
29 July	LB	(England)	Macaulay Gillesphey	(England) Newcastle United	initial: 2 January extended: End of season	
31 January	CF	(England)	Jamie Proctor	(England) Bolton Wanderers	End of season	
31 January	FW	(England)	George Waring	(England) Stoke City	End of season	

=== Loans out ===
Date from	Position	Nationality	Name	To	Date until	Ref.
22 September	FW	(England)	Russell Penn	(England) Gateshead	initial: 24 October extended: 26 December	
4 November	DF	(England)	Patrick Brough	(England) Salford City	initial: 4 December extended: End of Season	
2 December	DF	(England)	David Atkinson	(England) Blyth Spartans	initial: 2 January extended: 3 February	
13 January	FW	(England)	Russell Penn	(Wales) Wrexham	End of Season	
26 January	DF	(England)	Mark Ellis	(England) Forest Green Rovers	End of Season	

== Competitions ==
=== Pre-season friendlies ===
On 6 June 2016, Carlisle United announced their provisional pre-season schedule. Two matches were announced to be played behind closed doors. One match was against Queen of the South F.C. (Result: 2–3 loss) on 5 July 2016 and the other is against Bury F.C. on 26 July 2016.

6 July 2016 Friendly	Kendal Town	1–5	Carlisle United	Kendal
19:45 BST	Bailey 36' (pen.)	Report	Ibehre 16'; Brough 50'; Devitt 62' (pen.); Trialist 73'; Ellis 82'	Stadium: Pye Motors Stadium; Attendance: 313

9 July 2016 Friendly	Workington	1–3	Carlisle United	Workington
15:00 BST	Tinnion 48'	Report	Miller 15' (pen.); Penn 50'; McKee 52'	Stadium: Borough Park

13 July 2016 Friendly	Warrington Town	0–4	Carlisle United	Warrington
19:00 BST		Report	Kennedy 11'; Grainger 33' (pen.); Lambe 43'; Wyke 71'	Stadium: Cantilever Park

23 July 2015 Friendly	Barrow	1–0	Carlisle United	Barrow-in-Furness
15:00 BST	Hannah 17' (pen.)	Report		Stadium: Holker Street; Attendance: 703

30 July 2016 Friendly	Bradford City	2–0	Carlisle United	Bradford
15:00 BST	Morais 52'; Hanson 64'	Report		Stadium: Valley Parade; Referee: David Webb

1 August 2016 Friendly	Penrith	0–3	Carlisle United	Penrith
19:00 BST		Report	Wyke 11'; Brown 15'; Panayiotou 37'	Stadium: The World Group Stadium; Attendance: 470

=== League Two ===
==== League table ====
Pos	Team	Pld	W	D	L	GF	GA	GD	Pts	Promotion, qualification or relegation
4	Luton Town	46	20	17	9	70	43	+27	77	Qualification for League Two play-offs (Note: Four teams play for one spot and promotion to EFL League One)
5	Exeter City	46	21	8	17	75	56	+19	71	Qualification for League Two play-offs
6	Carlisle United	46	18	17	11	69	68	+1	71	Qualification for League Two play-offs
7	Blackpool (O, P)	46	18	16	12	69	46	+23	70	Qualification for League Two play-offs
8	Colchester United	46	19	12	15	67	57	+10	69	

Updated to match(es) played on 6 May 2017. Source: BBC Sport
Rules for classification: 1) Points; 2) Goal difference; 3) Number of goals scored
(O) Play-off winners; (P) Promoted

==== Results by matchday ====
Matchday	1	2	3	4	5	6	7	8	9	10	11	12	13	14	15	16	17	18	19	20	21	22	23	24	25	26	27	28	29	30	31	32	33	34	35	36	37	38	39	40	41	42	43	44	45	46
Ground	A	H	H	A	A	H	H	A	H	A	H	A	H	A	H	A	H	A	H	A	H	A	A	H	A	H	A	H	A	H	H	A	H	A	A	H	H	A	H	A	H	A	H	A	H	A
Result	D	W	D	D	W	D	D	D	W	D	W	W	W	W	W	L	W	D	W	D	W	D	W	L	L	D	D	D	W	L	W	W	L	L	L	L	D	L	L	W	L	D	D	D	W	W
Position	11	7	9	10	6	9	9	8	6	7	3	3	3	2	2	2	2	2	1	2	2	3	2	3	3	3	3	3	3	3	3	3	3	3	3	5	4	6	8	7	7	7	8	10	6	6

Updated to match(es) played on 6 May 2017. Source: Competitive Matches
A = Away; H = Home; W = Win; D = Draw; L = Loss

==== Matches ====
6 August 2016 1	Portsmouth	1–1	Carlisle United	Portsmouth
15:00	Baker 42'	Report	Lambe 14'	Stadium: Fratton Park; Attendance: 17,570; Referee: Graham Salisbury

13 August 2016 2	Carlisle United	1–0	Plymouth Argyle	Carlisle
15:00	Lambe 37'	Report		Stadium: Brunton Park; Attendance: 5,129; Referee: Andy Haines

16 August 2016 3	Carlisle United	1–1	Cheltenham Town	Carlisle
19:45	Kennedy 89'	Report	Pell 57'	Stadium: Brunton Park; Attendance: 4,203; Referee: Michael Salisbury

20 August 2016 4	Cambridge United	2–2	Carlisle United	Cambridge
15:00	Legge 7'; Berry 41' (pen.)	Report	Kennedy 23'; Wyke 59'	Stadium: Cambs Glass Stadium; Attendance: 4,139; Referee: Brett Huxtable

27 August 2016 5	Barnet	0–1	Carlisle United	London
15:00		Report	Ibehre 21'	Stadium: The Hive Stadium; Attendance: 1,620; Referee: Robert Jones

3 September 2016 6	Carlisle United	1–1	Accrington Stanley	Carlisle
15:00	Adams 65'	Report	Kee 58'	Stadium: Brunton Park; Attendance: 5,128

10 September 2016 7	Carlisle United	2–2	Leyton Orient	Carlisle
15:00 BST	Wyke 46'; Grainger 87' (pen.)	Report	McCallum 44'; Cornick 64'	Stadium: Brunton Park; Attendance: 4,465; Referee: Ben Toner

17 September 2016 8	Blackpool	2–2	Carlisle United	Blackpool
15:00 BST	Vassell 59'; Gnanduillet 74'	Report	Wyke 51'; Raynes 58'	Stadium: Bloomfield Road; Attendance: 5,471; Referee: James Adcock

24 September 2016 9	Carlisle United	1–0	Wycombe Wanderers	Carlisle
15:00 BST	Miller 57'	Report		Stadium: Brunton Park; Attendance: 4,354; Referee: Seb Stockbridge

27 September 2016 10	Doncaster Rovers	2–2	Carlisle United	Doncaster
19:45 BST	Rowe 18'; Marquis 44'	Report	Miller 15'; Ibehre 79'	Stadium: Keepmoat Stadium; Attendance: 4,773; Referee: Ross Joyce

1 October 2016 11	Carlisle United	2–0	Colchester United	Carlisle
15:00 BST	Kennedy 51'; Ibehre 79'	Report		Stadium: Brunton Park; Attendance: 4,516; Referee: Graham Salisbury

8 October 2016 12	Morecambe	0–3	Carlisle United	Morecambe
15:00		Report	Grainger 15'; Kennedy 72', 78'	Stadium: Globe Arena; Attendance: 3,773; Referee: Kevin Friend

15 October 2016 13	Carlisle United	3–2	Hartlepool United	Carlisle
15:00 BST	Ibehre 20'; Grainger 68'; Raynes 79'	Report	Alessandra 66'; Amond 75'	Stadium: Brunton Park; Attendance: 7,333; Referee: Darren Bond

22 October 2016 14	Stevenage	1–2	Carlisle United	Stevenage
15:00	Godden 44' (pen.)	Report	Kennedy 16'; Grainger 57' (pen.)	Stadium: Broadhall Way; Attendance: 2,720; Referee: Nick Kinseley

29 October 2016 15	Carlisle United	3–1	Crawley Town	Carlisle
15:00	Ibehre 5'; Kennedy 16'; Joyce 45'	Report	Connolly 90+4'	Stadium: Brunton Park; Attendance: 5,619; Referee: Ollie Yates

12 November 2016 16	Newport County	2–0	Carlisle United	Newport
13:00	Sheehan 2'; Healey 72'	Report		Stadium: Rodney Parade; Attendance: 2,521

19 November 2016 17	Carlisle United	3–2	Exeter City	Carlisle
15:00	Wyke 9', 90+7'; Miller 89'	Report	Reid 1'; Holmes 54'	Stadium: Brunton Park; Attendance: 5,058; Referee: Ross Joyce

22 November 2016 18	Grimsby Town	2–2	Carlisle United	Cleethorpes
19:45	Bogle 50' (pen.); Bolarinwa 78'	Report	Wyke 44'; Mills 65' (o.g.)	Stadium: Blundell Park; Attendance: 4,818; Referee: Nigel Miller

26 November 2016 19	Carlisle United	5–2	Mansfield Town	Carlisle
15:00	Kennedy 13'; Wyke 49', 62', 80' (pen.); Lambe 90+5'	Report	Hoban 6'; D. Rose 86'	Stadium: Brunton Park; Attendance: 4,822; Referee: Seb Stockbridge

10 December 2016 20	Luton Town	1–1	Carlisle United	Luton
15:00	Hylton 10'	Report	Kennedy 5'	Stadium: Kenilworth Road; Attendance: 7,953; Referee: Mark Heywood

17 December 2016 21	Carlisle United	2–1	Yeovil Town	Carlisle
15:00	Brisley 10'; Wyke 36'	Report	Smith 48'	Stadium: Brunton Park; Attendance: 4,646; Referee: Darren Handley

26 December 2016 22	Crewe Alexandra	1–1	Carlisle United	Crewe
15:00	Cooper 45'	Report	Miller 35'	Stadium: Gresty Road; Attendance: 4,963; Referee: Robert Lewis

31 December 2016 23	Notts County	2–3	Carlisle United	Nottingham
15:00	Stead 30'; Forte 39'	Report	Wyke 10'; Ibehre 45'; Kennedy 65'	Stadium: Meadow Lane; Attendance: 3,825; Referee: Robert Jones

2 January 2017 24	Carlisle United	1–3	Grimsby Town	Carlisle
15:00	Wyke 31'	Report	Yussuf 78'; Bogle 48', 74'	Stadium: Brunton Park; Attendance: 6,865; Referee: David Webb

7 January 2017 25	Colchester United	4–1	Carlisle United	Colchester
15:00 GMT	Porter 11'; Guthrie 33', 50', 90+5'	Report	Brisley 28'	Stadium: Weston Homes Community Stadium; Attendance: 3,525; Referee: Lee Swabey

14 January 2017 26	Carlisle United	1–1	Morecambe	Carlisle
15:00 GMT	Wyke 74'	Report	Wildig 7'	Stadium: Brunton Park; Attendance: 5,524; Referee: Ross Joyce

21 January 2017 27	Accrington Stanley	1–1	Carlisle United	Accrington
15:00 GMT	McCartan 21'	Report	Beckles 20' (o.g.)	Stadium: Wham Stadium; Attendance: 2,634; Referee: Chris Sarginson

28 January 2017 28	Carlisle United	1–1	Barnet	Carlisle
15:00	Wyke 74'	Report	Akinde 77' (pen.)	Stadium: Brunton Park; Attendance: 4,547; Referee: Michael Salisbury

4 February 2017 29	Leyton Orient	1–2	Carlisle United	London
15:00	Massey 25'	Report	Liddle 34'; Proctor 68'	Stadium: Brisbane Road; Attendance: 4,306; Referee: Graham Horwood

11 February 2017 30	Carlisle United	1–4	Blackpool	Carlisle
15:00	Ibehre 69'	Report	Potts 33'; Flores 56'; Odelusi 83'; Delfouneso 86'	Stadium: Brunton Park; Attendance: 6,170; Referee: Mark Haywood

14 February 2017 31	Carlisle United	2–1	Doncaster Rovers	Carlisle
19:45	Adams 34'; Mason 85' (o.g.)	Report	Rowe 90+5'	Stadium: Brunton Park; Attendance: 4,527; Referee: Tony Harrington

18 February 2017 32	Wycombe Wanderers	1–2	Carlisle United	High Wycombe
15:00	Akinfenwa 2'	Report	Proctor 9'; Lambe 34'	Stadium: Adams Park; Attendance: 3,585; Referee: Darren Drysdale

25 February 2017 33	Carlisle United	0–3	Portsmouth	Carlisle
15:00		Report	Roberts 73'; Linganzi 86'; Whatmough 90+2'	Stadium: Brunton Park; Attendance: 7,197; Referee: Richard Clark

28 February 2017 34	Cheltenham Town	1–0	Carlisle United	Cheltenham
19:45 GMT	Wright 85'	Report		Stadium: Whaddon Road; Attendance: 2,433; Referee: Andy Haines

4 March 2017 35	Plymouth Argyle	2–0	Carlisle United	Plymouth
15:00	Carey 73'; Jervis 45+1' (pen.)	Report		Stadium: Home Park; Attendance: 10,381; Referee: Mark Heywood

11 March 2017 36	Carlisle United	0–3	Cambridge United	Carlisle
15:00		Report	Elito 66' (pen.), 71' (pen.), 90+5'	Stadium: Brunton Park; Attendance: 4,427; Referee: Robert Jones

14 March 2017 37	Carlisle United	0–0	Luton Town	Carlisle
19:45		Report		Stadium: Brunton Park; Attendance: 4,052; Referee: Lee Mason

18 March 2017 38	Mansfield Town	2–0	Carlisle United	Mansfield
15:00 GMT	Green 63'; Coulthirst 76'	Report		Stadium: Field Mill; Attendance: 4,463; Referee: Brendan Malone

25 March 2017 39	Carlisle United	0–2	Crewe Alexandra	Carlisle
15:00 GMT		Report	Cooke 34'; Bowery 60'	Stadium: Brunton Park; Attendance: 4,695; Referee: Nigel Miller

1 April 2017 40	Yeovil Town	0–2	Carlisle United	Yeovil
15:00 GMT		Report	O'Sullivan 16'; Lambe 55'	Stadium: Huish Park; Attendance: 3,145; Referee: Trevor Kettle

8 April 2017 41	Carlisle United	1–2	Notts County	Carlisle
15:00 BST	Ibehre 57'	Report	Stead 85'; Tootle 89'	Stadium: Brunton Park; Attendance: 4,361; Referee: Seb Stockbridge

14 April 2017 42	Hartlepool United	1–1	Carlisle United	Hartlepool
15:00 BST	Oates 64'	Report	Ibehre 7'	Stadium: Victoria Park; Attendance: 5,011; Referee: Carl Boyeson

17 April 2017 43	Carlisle United	1–1	Stevenage	Carlisle
15:00 BST	Ibehre 72'	Report	Schumacher 50' (pen.)	Stadium: Brunton Park; Attendance: 4,572; Referee: Ben Toner

22 April 2017 44	Crawley Town	3–3	Carlisle United	Crawley
15:00 BST	Collins 12', 25' (pen.); Smith 90+2'	Report	Ibehre 29'; Proctor 42'; Lambe 59'	Stadium: Broadfield Stadium; Attendance: 2,003; Referee: Darren Deadman

29 April 2017 45	Carlisle United	2–1	Newport County	Carlisle
15:00 BST	Ibehre 58'; Adams 60'	Report	Demetriou 12'	Stadium: Brunton Park; Attendance: 5,402; Referee: David Webb

6 May 2017 46	Exeter City	2–3	Carlisle United	Exeter
17:30 BST	Reid 10'; Moore-Taylor 45+1'	Report	Grainger 30' (pen.), 72' (pen.); Proctor 76'	Stadium: St James Park; Attendance: 6,774; Referee: Steve Martin

==== Play-offs ====
14 May 2017 Semi-final first leg	Carlisle United	3–3	Exeter City	Carlisle
18:30 BST	Moore-Taylor 32' (o.g.); O'Sullivan 71'; Miller 73'	Report	Grant 15'; Harley 45+1'; Wheeler 56'	Stadium: Brunton Park; Attendance: 9,708; Referee: David Webb

18 May 2017 Semi-final second leg	Exeter City	3–2 (6–5 agg.)	Carlisle United	Exeter
19:45 BST	Watkins 10', 79'; Stacey 90+4'	Report	O'Sullivan 90'; Kennedy 81'	Stadium: St James Park; Attendance: 7,450; Referee: Dean Whitestone

=== FA Cup ===
As a League Two side, Carlisle entered the FA Cup draw at the first round stage.

6 November 2016 First round	St Albans City	3–5	Carlisle United	St Albans
15:00 GMT	Morias 4', 65'; Theophanous 86'	Report	Grainger 20' (pen.); Kennedy 57'; Ibehre 71', 81'; Lambe 83'	Stadium: Clarence Park; Attendance: 3,473; Referee: Simon Hooper

3 December 2016 Second round	Carlisle United	0–2	Rochdale	Carlisle
15:00 GMT		Report	Davies 48'; Mendez-Laing 90+3'	Stadium: Brunton Park; Attendance: 4,426

=== League Cup ===
Carlisle United entered the competition at the first round stage. On 21 June 2016, the first round draw was made; Carlisle were drawn at home against Port Vale.

8 August 2016 First round	Carlisle United	2–1	Port Vale	Carlisle
19:45	Wyke 27'; Miller 41'	Report	Grant 51'	Stadium: Brunton Park; Attendance: 3,363; Referee: Mark Haywood

23 August 2016 Second round	Derby County	1–1 (a.e.t.) (14–13 p)	Carlisle United	Derby
19:45 BST	Darren Bent 56'	Report	Jones 90+5'	Stadium: Pride Park Stadium; Attendance: 9,860; Referee: Darren England
	Penalties
	Ince (penalty scored); Blackman (penalty scored); Butterfield (penalty scored); Hughes (penalty missed); Keogh (penalty scored); Elšnik (penalty scored); Baird (penalty scored); Pearce (penalty missed); Lowe (penalty scored); Carson (penalty scored); Ince (penalty scored); Blackman (penalty scored); Butterfield (penalty scored); Hughes (penalty scored); Keogh (penalty scored); Elšnik (penalty scored)		Devitt (penalty scored); Jones (penalty scored); Joyce (penalty scored); Wyke (penalty missed); Grainger (penalty scored); McKee (penalty scored); Gillesphey (penalty scored); Ibehre (penalty missed); T. Miller (penalty scored); Raynes (penalty scored); Devitt (penalty scored); Jones (penalty scored); Joyce (penalty scored); Wyke (penalty scored); Grainger (penalty scored); McKee (penalty missed)

=== Checkatrade Trophy ===
==== Group D ====
Pos	Div	Team	Pld	W	PW	PL	L	GF	GA	GD	Pts	Qualification
1	L2	Carlisle United	3	3	0	0	0	11	6	+5	9	Advance to Round 2
2	L1	Oldham Athletic	3	1	1	0	1	8	7	+1	5	Advance to Round 2
3	L1	Fleetwood Town	3	1	0	0	2	3	6	−3	3	
4	ACA	Blackburn Rovers U21	3	0	0	1	2	2	5	−3	1	

Source: Sky Sports

Group Stage

30 August 2016 Match 1	Oldham Athletic	4–5	Carlisle United	Oldham
19:45 BST	Mckay 16'; Osei 48', 49'; Banks 66'	Report	Raynes 18'; Lambe 22'; Burgess 28' (o.g.); Miller 74'; Wyke 89'	Stadium: Boundary Park; Attendance: 1,897; Referee: Peter Bankes

4 October 2016 Match 2	Carlisle United	2–0	Blackburn Rovers Academy	Carlisle
19:45 BST	Miller 39'; Grainger 88' (pen.)	Report		Stadium: Brunton Park; Attendance: 1,253; Referee: Richard Clark

9 November 2016 Match 3	Carlisle United	4–2	Fleetwood Town	Carlisle
19:45 BST	McKee 14'; Wyke 18'; Grainger 41' (pen.); Salkeld 73'	Report	Sowerby 48'; Jakubiak 64'	Stadium: Brunton Park; Attendance: 1,420; Referee: Chris Sarginson

==== Knock-out stages ====
6 December 2016 Second round	Carlisle United	2–3	Mansfield Town	Carlisle
19:45 GMT	Miller 72'; Wyke 80'	Report	Pearce 15'; Green 30'; Rose 86'	Stadium: Brunton Park; Attendance: 1,126; Referee: David Webb
