= 2015–16 Carlisle United F.C. season =

Carlisle United
2015–16 season
- Chairman: Andrew Jenkins
- Manager: Keith Curle
- Stadium: Brunton Park
- League Two: 10th
- FA Cup: Fourth Round; Eliminated by Everton
- League Cup: Third round Eliminated by Liverpool
- League Trophy: First round Eliminated by Port Vale
- Top goalscorer: League: 15 – Jabo Ibehre; All: 17 – Jabo Ibehre
| Home colours | Away colours | Third colours |

The 2015–16 season was Carlisle United's 111th season in their history and their second consecutive season in League Two. Along with League Two, the club will also compete in the FA Cup, League Cup and League Trophy. The season covers the period from 1 July 2015 to 30 June 2016.

== Squad statistics ==
As of 7 May 2016

| No. | Pos | Nat | Player | Total | | League Two | | FA Cup | | League Cup | | JP Trophy | |
| No. | Pos | Nat | Player | Apps | Goals | Apps | Goals | Apps | Goals | Apps | Goals | Apps | Goals |
|---|---|---|---|---|---|---|---|---|---|---|---|---|---|
| 1 | GK | (England) ENG | Mark Gillespie | 50 | 0 | 45+0 | 0 | 2+0 | 0 | 3+0 | 0 | 0+0 | 0 |
| 2 | DF | (England) ENG | Tom Miller | 35 | 5 | 28+1 | 5 | 1+1 | 0 | 2+1 | 0 | 1+0 | 0 |
| 3 | DF | (England) ENG | Danny Grainger | 43 | 7 | 35+0 | 5 | 4+0 | 2 | 3+0 | 0 | 1+0 | 0 |
| 4 | MF | (England) ENG | Luke Joyce | 43 | 0 | 35+3 | 0 | 3+0 | 0 | 2+0 | 0 | 0+0 | 0 |
| 5 | DF | (England) ENG | Michael Raynes | 49 | 3 | 39+1 | 3 | 5+0 | 0 | 3+0 | 0 | 1+0 | 0 |
| 6 | DF | (England) ENG | David Atkinson | 27 | 0 | 22+1 | 0 | 4+0 | 0 | 0+0 | 0 | 0+0 | 0 |
| 7 | MF | (England) ENG | Jason Kennedy | 49 | 3 | 43+0 | 2 | 4+0 | 0 | 1+1 | 1 | 0+0 | 0 |
| 8 | MF | (England) ENG | Martin Smith (loan) | 2 | 0 | 1+1 | 0 | 0+0 | 0 | 0+0 | 0 | 0+0 | 0 |
| 9 | FW | (England) ENG | Charlie Wyke | 38 | 15 | 29+5 | 12 | 3+0 | 3 | 1+0 | 0 | 0+0 | 0 |
| 10 | MF | (France) FRA | Bastien Héry | 25 | 0 | 16+4 | 0 | 0+2 | 0 | 2+0 | 0 | 1+0 | 0 |
| 11 | DF | (England) ENG | Patrick Brough | 11 | 0 | 6+1 | 0 | 0+1 | 0 | 2+0 | 0 | 0+1 | 0 |
| 12 | MF | (England) ENG | Antony Sweeney | 26 | 4 | 13+7 | 1 | 3+0 | 3 | 2+0 | 0 | 1+0 | 0 |
| 13 | GK | (Wales) WAL | Dan Hanford | 6 | 0 | 1+1 | 0 | 3+0 | 0 | 0+0 | 0 | 1+0 | 0 |
| 14 | FW | (England) ENG | Jabo Ibehre | 43 | 17 | 28+7 | 15 | 2+2 | 0 | 0+3 | 2 | 0+1 | 0 |
| 15 | MF | (Montserrat) MSR | Brandon Comley (loan) | 13 | 0 | 12+0 | 0 | 1+0 | 0 | 0+0 | 0 | 0+0 | 0 |
| 15 | DF | (England) ENG | Courtney Meppen-Walter (free agent) | 0 | 0 | 0+0 | 0 | 0+0 | 0 | 0+0 | 0 | 0+0 | 0 |
| 16 | FW | (England) ENG | Jack Stacey (loan) | 9 | 2 | 7+2 | 2 | 0+0 | 0 | 0+0 | 0 | 0+0 | 0 |
| 16 | MF | (Ireland) EIR | Gary Dicker (free agent) | 27 | 0 | 12+7 | 0 | 3+1 | 0 | 3+0 | 0 | 1+0 | 0 |
| 17 | FW | (England) ENG | Alex Gilliead (loan) | 40 | 5 | 22+12 | 5 | 4+1 | 0 | 0+1 | 0 | 0+0 | 0 |
| 17 | MF | (Ireland) EIR | Danny Kearns (free agent) | 0 | 0 | 0+0 | 0 | 0+0 | 0 | 0+0 | 0 | 0+0 | 0 |
| 18 | FW | (Ghana) GHA | Kevin Osei (free agent) | 9 | 1 | 2+6 | 0 | 0+0 | 0 | 0+1 | 1 | 0+0 | 0 |
| 19 | MF | (Colombia) COL | Ángelo Balanta | 10 | 1 | 5+2 | 1 | 0+0 | 0 | 2+0 | 0 | 1+0 | 0 |
| 20 | DF | (England) ENG | Troy Archibald-Henville | 14 | 2 | 6+7 | 2 | 0+0 | 0 | 0+1 | 0 | 0+0 | 0 |
| 21 | MF | (England) ENG | Steven Rigg | 10 | 0 | 2+6 | 0 | 0+0 | 0 | 1+0 | 0 | 1+0 | 0 |
| 22 | MF | (England) ENG | Matthew Douglas | 0 | 0 | 0+0 | 0 | 0+0 | 0 | 0+0 | 0 | 0+0 | 0 |
| 23 | MF | (England) ENG | Joe Thompson | 17 | 1 | 4+11 | 1 | 0+1 | 0 | 0+0 | 0 | 1+0 | 0 |
| 24 | FW | (England) ENG | Hallam Hope (loan) | 26 | 5 | 17+5 | 4 | 2+2 | 1 | 0+0 | 0 | 0+0 | 0 |
| 25 | FW | (Ghana) GHA | Derek Asamoah | 50 | 8 | 11+31 | 6 | 2+3 | 0 | 2+0 | 2 | 0+1 | 0 |
| 26 | FW | (England) ENG | Macaulay Gillesphey (loan) | 28 | 2 | 19+5 | 2 | 2+1 | 0 | 0+1 | 0 | 0+0 | 0 |
| 27 | DF | (England) ENG | Mark Ellis | 34 | 0 | 29+0 | 0 | 5+0 | 0 | 0+0 | 0 | 0+0 | 0 |
| 28 | MF | (Netherlands) NED | Luis Pedro | 1 | 0 | 0+1 | 0 | 0+0 | 0 | 0+0 | 0 | 0+0 | 0 |
| 28 | MF | (England) ENG | Connor Hammell (free agent) | 0 | 0 | 0+0 | 0 | 0+0 | 0 | 0+0 | 0 | 0+0 | 0 |
| 40 | GK | (England) ENG | Morgan Bacon | 0 | 0 | 0+0 | 0 | 0+0 | 0 | 0+0 | 0 | 0+0 | 0 |
| 44 | MF | (England) ENG | Alexander McQueen | 26 | 0 | 15+6 | 0 | 1+0 | 0 | 3+0 | 0 | 1+0 | 0 |

=== Top scorers ===
| Place | Position | Nation | Number | Name | League Two | FA Cup | League Cup | JP Trophy | Total |
|---|---|---|---|---|---|---|---|---|---|
| 1 | FW | (England) | 14 | Jabo Ibehre | 15 | 0 | 2 | 0 | 17 |
| 2 | FW | (England) | 9 | Charlie Wyke | 12 | 3 | 0 | 0 | 15 |
| 3 | FW | (Ghana) | 25 | Derek Asamoah | 6 | 0 | 2 | 0 | 8 |
| 4 | DF | (England) | 3 | Danny Grainger | 5 | 2 | 0 | 0 | 7 |
| 5 | FW | (England) | 17 | Alex Gilliead | 5 | 0 | 0 | 0 | 5 |
| 5 | FW | (England) | 24 | Hallam Hope | 4 | 1 | 0 | 0 | 5 |
| 5 | MF | (England) | 2 | Tom Miller | 5 | 0 | 0 | 0 | 5 |
| 8 | MF | (England) | 12 | Antony Sweeney | 1 | 3 | 0 | 0 | 4 |
| 9 | DF | (England) | 7 | Jason Kennedy | 2 | 0 | 1 | 0 | 3 |
| 9 | DF | (England) | 5 | Michael Raynes | 3 | 0 | 0 | 0 | 3 |
| 11 | FW | (England) | 26 | Macaulay Gillesphey | 2 | 0 | 0 | 0 | 2 |
| 11 | DF | (England) | 20 | Troy Archibald-Henville | 2 | 0 | 0 | 0 | 2 |
| 11 | FW | (England) | 16 | Jack Stacey | 2 | 0 | 0 | 0 | 2 |
| 14 | MF | (Colombia) | 18 | Ángelo Balanta | 1 | 0 | 0 | 0 | 1 |
| 14 | MF | (England) | 27 | Mark Ellis | 0 | 1 | 0 | 0 | 1 |
| 14 | FW | (Ghana) | 18 | Kevin Osei | 0 | 0 | 1 | 0 | 1 |
| 14 | MF | (England) | 23 | Joe Thompson | 1 | 0 | 0 | 0 | 1 |
| Own goals | | | | | 1 | 0 | 0 | 0 | 1 |
| | | | | TOTALS | 67 | 10 | 6 | 0 | 83 |

=== Disciplinary record ===
| Number | Nation | Position | Name | League Two | | FA Cup | | League Cup | | JP Trophy | | Total | |
| Number | Nation | Position | Name | Yellow card | Red card | Yellow card | Red card | Yellow card | Red card | Yellow card | Red card | Yellow card | Red card |
| 4 | (England) | DF | Luke Joyce | 4 | 1 | 0 | 1 | 0 | 0 | 0 | 0 | 4 | 2 |
| 27 | (England) | FW | Mark Ellis | 5 | 1 | 1 | 0 | 0 | 0 | 0 | 0 | 6 | 1 |
| 14 | (England) | FW | Jabo Ibehre | 2 | 1^{(10)} | 1 | 0 | 0 | 0 | 0 | 0 | 3 | 1 |
| 24 | (England) | MF | Hallam Hope | 2 | 1 | 1 | 0 | 0 | 0 | 0 | 0 | 3 | 1 |
| 1 | (England) | GK | Mark Gillespie | 2 | 1 | 0 | 0 | 0 | 0 | 0 | 0 | 2 | 1 |
| 15 | (Montserrat) | MF | Brandon Comley | 1 | 1 | 0 | 0 | 0 | 0 | 0 | 0 | 1 | 1 |
| 2 | (England) | MF | Tom Miller | 9 | 0 | 0 | 0 | 0 | 0 | 1 | 0 | 10 | 0 |
| 6 | (England) | DF | Michael Raynes | 7 | 0 | 1 | 0 | 1 | 0 | 0 | 0 | 9 | 0 |
| 3 | (England) | DF | Danny Grainger | 6 | 0 | 0 | 0 | 0 | 0 | 0 | 0 | 6 | 0 |
| 16 | (Republic of Ireland) | MF | Gary Dicker | 2 | 0 | 1 | 0 | 1 | 0 | 1 | 0 | 5 | 0 |
| 9 | (England) | FW | Charlie Wyke | 4 | 0 | 0 | 0 | 0 | 0 | 0 | 0 | 4 | 0 |
| 6 | (England) | DF | David Atkinson | 2 | 0 | 1 | 0 | 0 | 0 | 0 | 0 | 3 | 0 |
| 20 | (England) | DF | Troy Archibald-Henville | 3 | 0 | 0 | 0 | 0 | 0 | 0 | 0 | 3 | 0 |
| 10 | (France) | MF | Bastien Héry | 3 | 0 | 0 | 0 | 0 | 0 | 0 | 0 | 3 | 0 |
| 7 | (England) | FW | Jason Kennedy | 2 | 0 | 1 | 0 | 0 | 0 | 0 | 0 | 3 | 0 |
| 12 | (England) | MF | Antony Sweeney | 0 | 0 | 2 | 0 | 1 | 0 | 0 | 0 | 3 | 0 |
| 21 | (England) | FW | Steven Rigg | 1 | 0 | 0 | 0 | 1 | 0 | 0 | 0 | 2 | 0 |
| 25 | (Ghana) | FW | Derek Asamoah | 1 | 0 | 0 | 0 | 0 | 0 | 0 | 0 | 1 | 0 |
| 18 | (Colombia) | MF | Ángelo Balanta | 1 | 0 | 0 | 0 | 0 | 0 | 0 | 0 | 1 | 0 |
| 15 | (Montserrat) | MF | Brandon Comley | 1 | 0 | 0 | 0 | 0 | 0 | 0 | 0 | 1 | 0 |
| 26 | (England) | MF | Macaulay Gillesphey | 1 | 0 | 0 | 0 | 0 | 0 | 0 | 0 | 1 | 0 |
| 44 | (England) | DF | Alexander McQueen | 1 | 0 | 0 | 0 | 0 | 0 | 0 | 0 | 1 | 0 |
| 8 | (England) | MF | Martin Smith | 1 | 0 | 0 | 0 | 0 | 0 | 0 | 0 | 1 | 0 |
| | | | TOTALS | 60 | 6 | 9 | 1 | 4 | 0 | 2 | 0 | 75 | 7 |

Notes:

- ^(10) The red card that Jabo Ibehre received in the Round 28 match against Accrington Stanley was rescinded by the FA Appeal Board after the club appealed.

== Transfers ==
=== Transfers in ===
| Date from | Position | Nationality | Name | From | Fee | Ref. |
|---|---|---|---|---|---|---|
| 19 May | CM | ENG | Connor Hammell | Academy | Trainee | |
| 19 May | CM | ENG | Jason Kennedy | Bradford City | Free transfer | |
| 20 May | CB | ENG | Michael Raynes | Mansfield Town | Free transfer | |
| 21 May | DM | ENG | Luke Joyce | Accrington Stanley | Free transfer | |
| 4 June | CB | ENG | David Atkinson | Middlesbrough | Free transfer | |
| 11 June | CM | ENG | Tom Miller | Lincoln City | Free transfer | |
| 24 June | DM | FRA | Bastien Héry | Rochdale | Free transfer | |
| 25 June | CF | ENG | Jabo Ibehre | Colchester United | Free transfer | |
| 30 June | LW | ENG | Ángelo Balanta | Bristol Rovers | Free transfer | |
| 30 June | RB | ENG | Alexander McQueen | Tottenham Hotspur | Free transfer | |
| 28 July | RW | GHA | Kevin Osei | Waasland-Beveren | Free transfer | |
| 31 July | RM | ENG | Joe Thompson | Bury | Free transfer | |
| 3 January | DF | ENG | Mark Ellis | Shrewsbury Town | Free transfer | |
| 24 March | FW | NED | Luis Pedro | Târgu Mureș | Free transfer | |

=== Loans in ===
| Date from | Position | Nationality | Name | From | Date until | Ref. |
|---|---|---|---|---|---|---|
| 14 September | LB | ENG | Macaulay Gillesphey | Newcastle United | initial: 11 October extended: End of season | |
| 14 September | CF | ENG | Alex Gilliead | Newcastle United | initial: 11 October extended: End of Season | |
| 18 September | RB | ENG | Daniel Wiseman | Sunderland | initial: End Of Season recalled 3 May | |
| 29 October | DF | ENG | Mark Ellis | Shrewsbury Town | initial: 29 November extended: 2 January | |
| 21 January | MF | MSR | Brandon Comley | Queens Park Rangers | initial: 21 February extended: 20 March | |
| 19 March | MF | ENG | Martin Smith | Sunderland | End of Season | |
| 24 March | FW | ENG | Jack Stacey | Reading | initial: End of Season recalled 3 May | |

=== Transfers out ===
| Date from | Position | Nationality | Name | To | Fee | Ref. |
|---|---|---|---|---|---|---|
| 1 July | RW | ENG | David Amoo | Partick Thistle | Free transfer | |
| 1 July | CB | ENG | Nathan Buddle | Gateshead | Free transfer | |
| 1 July | CF | IRL | Stephen Elliott | Free Agent | Released | |
| 1 July | AM | ENG | Josh Gillies | Gateshead (Note: Following Gillies' release he joined Gateshead.) | Free transfer | |
| 1 July | CB | ENG | Sean O'Hanlon | Stockport County (Note: Following O'Hanlon's release he joined Stockport County.) | Free transfer | |
| 1 July | CF | ENG | Billy Paynter | Hartlepool United | Free transfer | |
| 1 July | RM | ENG | Brad Potts | Blackpool | Undisclosed | |
| 1 July | LB | ENG | Matty Robson | Shildon | Released | |
| 1 July | RB | ENG | David Symington | Barrow (Note: Following Symington's release he joined Barrow.) | Free transfer | |
| 1 July | DM | ENG | Paul Thirlwell | Harrogate Town (Note: Following Thirlwell's release he joined Harrogate Town.) | Free transfer | |
| 10 July | AM | ENG | Kyle Dempsey | Huddersfield Town | £300,000 | |
| 10 July | DM | MSR | Anthony Griffith | Altrincham (Note: Following Griffith's release he joined Altrincham.) | Free transfer | |
| 24 July | CF | SCO | Mark Beck | Yeovil Town | Undisclosed | |
| 26 November | DF | ENG | Courtney Meppen-Walter | Chorley | Released | |
| 1 September | RM | IRL | Daniel Kearns | Glenavon | Mutual consent | |
| 23 December | FW | GHA | Kevin Osei | | Mutual consent | |
| 1 February | MF | IRE | Gary Dicker | Kilmarnock | Released | |
| 9 March | MF | ENG | Connor Hammell | Workington | Mutual consent | |

Total income: ▲£300,000

=== Loans out ===
| Date from | Position | Nationality | Name | To | Date until | Ref. |
|---|---|---|---|---|---|---|
| 26 November | FW | ENG | Steven Rigg | Barrow | 29 November^{(11)} | |
| 2 January | MF | ENG | Patrick Brough | Lincoln City | 2 February | |

Notes:

- ^(11) Original loan was until 2 January. Loan terminated earlier due to Rigg sustaining an injury.

== Competitions ==
=== Pre-season friendlies ===
On 11 June 2015, Carlisle United announced their finalised pre-season schedule.

| 7 July 2015 Friendly | Blyth Spartans | 0–1 | Carlisle United | Blyth |
| 19:30 BST | | Report | Sweeney 51' | Stadium: Croft Park; Attendance: 626 |

| 9 July 2015 Friendly | Workington | 0–3 | Carlisle United | Workington |
| 19:45 BST | | Report | Asamoah 44'; Osei 67'; Kearns 90' | Stadium: Borough Park; Attendance: 662 |

| 11 July 2015 Friendly | Penrith | 0–7 | Carlisle United | Penrith |
| 15:00 BST | | Report | Grainger; Wyke; Miller; Kennedy; Beck | Stadium: The World Group Stadium; Attendance: 850 |

| 25 July 2015 Friendly | Bradford City | 2–0 | Carlisle United | Bradford |
| 15:00 BST | Morris 58'; Liddle 72' | Report | | Stadium: Valley Parade |

| 28 July 2015 Friendly | Carlisle United | 4–3 | Preston North End | Carlisle |
| 19:15 BST | Miller 20'; Kennedy 25'; Grainger 39' (pen.), 81' (pen.) | Report | Hugill 12', 50'; Keane 28' | Stadium: Brunton Park; Attendance: 1,938 (176 away fans); Referee: Richard Clark |

| 1 August 2015 Friendly | Carlisle United | 3–1 | Oldham Athletic | Carlisle |
| 15:00 BST | Balanta 29'; Asamoah 56'; Rigg 84' | Report | Murphy 66' | Stadium: Brunton Park; Referee: Eddie Ilderton |

=== League Two ===
==== League table ====
| Pos | Team | Pld | W | D | L | GF | GA | GD | Pts |
|---|---|---|---|---|---|---|---|---|---|
| 8 | Leyton Orient | 46 | 19 | 12 | 15 | 60 | 61 | −1 | 69 |
| 9 | Cambridge United | 46 | 18 | 14 | 14 | 66 | 55 | +11 | 68 |
| 10 | Carlisle United | 46 | 17 | 16 | 13 | 67 | 62 | +5 | 67 |
| 11 | Luton Town | 46 | 19 | 9 | 18 | 63 | 61 | +2 | 66 |
| 12 | Mansfield Town | 46 | 17 | 13 | 16 | 61 | 53 | +8 | 64 |

Updated to match(es) played on 7 May 2016. Source: BBC Sport
Rules for classification: 1) Points; 2) Goal difference; 3) Number of goals scored

==== Results by matchday ====
| Matchday | 1 | 2 | 3 | 4 | 5 | 6 | 7 | 8 | 9 | 10 | 11 | 12 | 13 | 14 | 15 | 16 | 17 | 18 | 19 | 20 | 21 | 22 | 23 | 24 | 25 | 26 | 27 | 28 | 29 | 30 | 31 | 32 | 33 | 34 | 35 | 36 | 37 | 38 | 39 | 40 | 41 | 42 | 43 | 44 | 45 | 46 |
|---|---|---|---|---|---|---|---|---|---|---|---|---|---|---|---|---|---|---|---|---|---|---|---|---|---|---|---|---|---|---|---|---|---|---|---|---|---|---|---|---|---|---|---|---|---|---|
| Ground | A | H | A | H | A | H | H | A | H | A | A | H | H | A | A | H | A | H | A | H | A | H | H | A | H | H | A | A | H | A | A | H | H | A | A | H | A | H | A | H | H | A | H | A | H | A |
| Result | D | D | L | D | W | W | W | D | L | W | W | L | W | L | D | W | L | D | W | W | D | W | L | D | D | W | L | D | W | L | W | D | L | D | D | D | D | W | L | W | L | D | L | W | L | W |
| Position | 11 | 14 | 20 | 20 | 16 | 11 | 9 | 10 | 12 | 8 | 8 | 9 | 7 | 9 | 9 | 8 | 10 | 9 | 7 | 6 | 6 | 5 | 9 | 10 | 10 | 12 | 12 | 12 | 12 | 12 | 11 | 11 | 11 | 11 | 10 | 11 | 10 | 9 | 11 | 8 | 10 | 11 | 14 | 10 | 12 | 10 |

Updated to match(es) played on 7 May 2016. Source: Competitive Matches
A = Away; H = Home; W = Win; D = Draw; L = Loss

==== Matches ====
On 17 June 2015, the fixtures for the forthcoming season were announced.

| 8 August 2015 1 | Mansfield Town | 1–1 | Carlisle United | Mansfield |
| 15:00 BST | Benning 29' | Report | Ibehre 45' | Stadium: Field Mill; Attendance: 4,146; Referee: Lee Swabey |

| 15 August 2015 2 | Carlisle United | 4–4 | Cambridge United | Carlisle |
| 15:00 BST | Ibehre 42', 44', 76'; Wyke 50' | Report | Corr 11', 45'; Taft 21'; Berry 58' | Stadium: Brunton Park; Attendance: 6,354; Referee: Richard Clark |

| 18 August 2015 3 | Plymouth Argyle | 4–1 | Carlisle United | Plymouth |
| 19:45 BST | Jervis 43', 65'; Reid 53'; Carey 56' | Report | Thompson 90+3' | Stadium: Home Park; Attendance: 6,071; Referee: Oliver Langford |

| 22 August 2015 4 | Carlisle United | 1–1 | AFC Wimbledon | Carlisle |
| 15:00BST | Ibehre 67' | Report | Barcham 36' | Stadium: Brunton Park; Attendance: 5,949; Referee: Darren Drysdale |

| 29 August 2015 5 | Hartlepool United | 2–3 | Carlisle United | Hartlepool |
| 15:00BST | Harrison 6'; Paynter 70' (pen.) | Report | Ibehre 57', 84'; Miller 76' | Stadium: Victoria Park; Attendance: 4,935; Referee: Andy Haines |

| 5 September 2015 6 | Carlisle United | 3–2 | Barnet | Carlisle |
| 14:00BST | Miller 2'; Asamoah 19', 64' | Report | Dembele 29'; Gash 31' | Stadium: Brunton Park; Attendance: 4,925; Referee: Nigel Miller |

| 12 September 2015 7 | Carlisle United | 2–1 | Dagenham & Redbridge | Carlisle |
| 15:00 | Balanta 37'; Ibehre 53' | Report | Doidge 11' | Stadium: Brunton Park; Attendance: 3,871; Referee: Ross Joyce |

| 19 September 2015 8 | York City | 2–2 | Carlisle United | York |
| 15:00 | Summerfield 72' (pen.); Carson 74' | Report | Miller 26'; Archibald-Henville 42' | Stadium: Bootham Crescent; Attendance: 3,692; Referee: Nick Kinseley |

| 26 September 2015 9 | Carlisle United | 0–1 | Newport County | Carlisle |
| 15:00 | | Report | Blackwood 68' | Stadium: Brunton Park; Attendance: 4,402; Referee: Kevin Wright |

| 29 September 2015 10 | Leyton Orient | 1–2 | Carlisle United | Leyton, London |
| 19:45 | Baudry 64' | Report | Asamoah 62'; Sweeney 72' | Stadium: Brisbane Road; Attendance: 4,408; Referee: Charles Breakspear |

| 3 October 2015 11 | Stevenage | 0–1 | Carlisle United | Stevenage |
| 15:00 | | Report | Miller 82' | Stadium: Broadhall Way; Attendance: 2,999; Referee: Andy Davies |

| 10 October 2015 12 | Carlisle United | 2–3 | Morecambe | Carlisle |
| 15:00 | Grainger 20'; Asamoah 90+2' | Report | Miller 35', 74'; Barkhuizen 63' | Stadium: Brunton Park; Attendance: 5,305; Referee: Peter Bankes |

| 17 October 2015 13 | Carlisle United | 1–0 | Exeter City | Carlisle |
| 15:00 | Gilliead 77' | Report | | Stadium: Brunton Park; Attendance: 4,021; Referee: Tony Harrington |

| 20 October 2015 14 | Northampton Town | 3–2 | Carlisle United | Northampton |
| 19:45 | Calvert-Lewin 45+2', 63'; Hoskins 47' | Report | Gilliead 29'; Wyke 90+2' | Stadium: Sixfields Stadium; Attendance: 3,642; Referee: Graham Horwood |

| 24 October 2015 15 | Wycombe Wanderers | 1–1 | Carlisle United | High Wycombe |
| 15:00 | Hayes 90' | Report | Archibald-Henville 48' | Stadium: Adams Park; Attendance: 3,457; Referee: Robert Lewis |

| 31 October 2015 16 | Carlisle United | 3–2 | Yeovil Town | Carlisle |
| 15:00 | Raynes 31', 75'; Gillesphey 55' | Report | Bird 5'; Dickson 8' | Stadium: Brunton Park; Attendance: 4,095; Referee: David Webb |

| 14 November 2015 17 | Bristol Rovers | 2–0 | Carlisle United | Bristol |
| 15:00 | Taylor 66', 87' | Report | | Stadium: Memorial Stadium; Attendance: 6,423; Referee: Mark Brown |

| 21 November 2015 18 | Carlisle United | 2–2 | Portsmouth | Carlisle |
| 15:00 | Grainger 44' (pen.), 90+5' | Report | Lavery 66'; McNulty 68' | Stadium: Brunton Park; Attendance: 5,503 |

| 24 November 2015 19 | Luton Town | 3–4 | Carlisle United | Luton |
| 19:45 | Marriott 4'; McQuoid 46'; Green 57' | Report | Wyke 45'; Gilliead 66'; Ibehre 79'; Asamoah 80' | Stadium: Kenilworth Road; Attendance: 7,298; Referee: Lee Swabey |

| 28 November 2015 20 | Carlisle United | 3–1 | Crawley Town | Carlisle |
| 15:00 | Wyke 2', 29'; Ibehre 49' | Report | Murphy 34' | Stadium: Brunton Park; Attendance: 4,641; Referee: Graham Salisbury |

| 12 December 2015 21 | Oxford United | 1–1 | Carlisle United | Oxford |
| 15:00 | MacDonald 34' | Report | Dunkley 45+4' (o.g.) | Stadium: Kassam Stadium; Attendance: 5,936; Referee: Mark Haywood |

| 19 December 2015 22 | Carlisle United | 3–0 | Notts County | Preston |
| 15:00 | Grainger 6' (pen.); Ibehre 45', 59' | Report | | Stadium: Deepdale Stadium; Attendance: 3,336; Referee: Darren Bond |
Note: Carlisle's Round 22 home match was moved to Deepdale Stadium due to flooding from the Storm Desmond

| 26 December 2015 23 | Accrington Stanley | ppd. | Carlisle United | Accrington |
| 15:00 | | | | Stadium: Crown Ground |
Note: Carlisle's away match was postponed due to Accrington Stanley's home ground, Crown Ground was under water due to heavy rain.

| 28 December 2015 23 | Carlisle United | ppd. | Hartlepool United | Carlisle |
| 15:00 | | | | Stadium: Brunton Park |
Note: Carlisle's Round 24 home match was postponed to a later date due to the club unable to find an alternative venue because of the state of the home ground after flooding from the Storm Desmond.

| 2 January 2016 23 | Carlisle United | 0–2 | Plymouth Argyle | Blackburn |
| 15:00 | | Report | Brunt 26'; Wylde 90+2' | Stadium: Ewood Park; Attendance: 4,415; Referee: Seb Stockbridge |
Note: Carlisle's scheduled home match was moved to Ewood Park due to the home ground not in playable state after Storm Desmond and Storm Eva.

| 16 January 2016 24 | Barnet | 0–0 | Carlisle United | London |
| 15:00 | | Report | | Stadium: The Hive Stadium; Attendance: 2,079; Referee: Steve Martin |

| 23 January 2016 25 | Carlisle United | 1–1 | York City | Carlisle |
| 15:00 | Kennedy 15' | Report | Summerfield 87' | Stadium: Brunton Park; Attendance: 7,461; Referee: Andy Haines |

| 6 February 2016 26 | Carlisle United | 2–0 | Accrington Stanley | Carlisle |
| 15:00 | Wyke 27'; Gilliead 38' | Report | | Stadium: Brunton Park; Attendance: 4,709; Referee: Geoff Eltringham |

| 13 February 2016 27 | Newport County | 1–0 | Carlisle United | Newport |
| 13:00 | Boden 56' | Report | | Stadium: Rodney Parade; Attendance: 2,106; Referee: Lee Collins |

| 16 February 2016 28 | Accrington Stanley | 1–1 | Carlisle United | Accrington |
| 19:45 | Gornell 58' | Report | Hope 17' | Stadium: Crown Ground; Attendance: 2,080; Referee: Jeremy Simpson |

| 20 February 2016 29 | Carlisle United | 1–0 | Stevenage | Carlisle |
| 15:00 | Ibehre 59' | Report | | Stadium: Brunton Park; Attendance: 4,780; Referee: Eddie Ilderton |

| 23 February 2016 30 | AFC Wimbledon | 1–0 | Carlisle United | Kingston upon Thames, London |
| 19:45 | Robinson 53' | Report | | Stadium: Kingsmeadow; Attendance: 3,526; Referee: Darren Deadman |

| 27 February 2016 31 | Morecambe | 1–2 | Carlisle United | Morecambe |
| 15:00 | Ellison 27' | Report | Wyke 83' (pen.); Asamoah 84' | Stadium: Globe Arena; Attendance: 3,070; Referee: Darren Drysdale |

| 1 March 2016 32 | Carlisle United | 2–2 | Leyton Orient | Carlisle |
| 19:45 | Gillesphey 17'; Raynes 84' | Report | Simpson 50'; Palmer 72' | Stadium: Brunton Park; Attendance: 3,721; Referee: Nigel Miller |

| 5 March 2016 33 | Carlisle United | 1–4 | Northampton Town | Carlisle |
| 15:00 | Hope 47' | Report | Marquis 16'; O'Toole 33', 59'; Collins 74' | Stadium: Brunton Park; Attendance: 4,892; Referee: David Coote |

| 8 March 2016 34 | Dagenham & Redbridge | 0–0 | Carlisle United | Dagenham, London |
| 19:45 | | Report | | Stadium: Victoria Road; Attendance: 1,695; Referee: Kevin Johnson |

| 12 March 2016 35 | Exeter City | 2–2 | Carlisle United | Exeter |
| 15:00 | Stockley 7'; Wheeler 79' | Report | Wyke 27'; Hope 85' | Stadium: St James Park; Attendance: 3,375; Referee: Nick Kinseley |
Note: Match was interrupted for 70 minutes in the tenth minute of the match after a fire alarm forced an evacuation of one of the grandstands at St. James Park.

| 19 March 2016 36 | Carlisle United | 1–1 | Wycombe Wanderers | Carlisle |
| 15:00 | Wyke 26' | Report | Wood 12' | Stadium: Brunton Park; Attendance: 4,532; Referee: Tim Robinson |

| 25 March 2016 37 | Yeovil Town | 0–0 | Carlisle United | Yeovil |
| 15:00 | | Report | | Stadium: Huish Park; Attendance: 4,075; Referee: Kevin Johnson |

| 28 March 2016 38 | Carlisle United | 3–2 | Bristol Rovers | Carlisle |
| 15:00 | Stacey 11'; Wyke 49'; Kennedy 85' | Report | Bodin 11'; Taylor 57' | Stadium: Brunton Park; Attendance: 4,718; Referee: Darren England |

| 2 April 2016 39 | Portsmouth | 1–0 | Carlisle United | Portsmouth |
| 15:00 | Smith 57' | Report | | Stadium: Fratton Park; Attendance: 15,416; Referee: Charles Breakspear |

| 5 April 2016 40 | Carlisle United | 1–0 | Hartlepool United | Carlisle |
| 19:45 | Hallam Hope 55' | Report | | Stadium: Brunton Park; Attendance: 4,767; Referee: Darren Bond |

| 9 April 2016 41 | Carlisle United | 1–2 | Mansfield Town | Carlisle |
| 15:00 BST | Miller 90+4' | Report | Daniel 21'; Lambe 62' | Stadium: Brunton Park; Attendance: 4,426; Referee: David Webb |

| 16 April 2016 42 | Cambridge United | 0–0 | Carlisle United | Cambridge |
| 15:00 | | Report | | Stadium: Abbey Stadium; Attendance: 5,806; Referee: Ben Toner |

| 19 April 2016 43 | Carlisle United | 1–2 | Luton Town | Carlisle |
| 19:45 | Stacey 61' | | Pigott 23'; McQuoid 51' | Stadium: Brunton Park; Attendance: 3,497; Referee: Tom Harrington |

| 23 April 2016 44 | Crawley Town | 0–1 | Carlisle United | Crawley |
| 15:00 | | Report | Wyke 78' | Stadium: Broadfield Stadium; Attendance: 1,940; Referee: Gavin Ward |

| 30 April 2016 45 | Carlisle United | 0–2 | Oxford United | Carlisle |
| 15:00 | | Report | Maguire 4' (pen.); Sercombe 74' | Stadium: Brunton Park; Attendance: 6,948; Referee: Phil Gibbs |

| 7 May 2016 46 | Notts County | 0–5 | Carlisle United | Nottingham |
| 15:00 | | Report | Gilliead 4'; Grainger 28'; Ibehre 40', 54'; Wyke 80' | Stadium: Meadow Lane; Attendance: 5,405; Referee: Fred Graham |

=== FA Cup ===
The First Round draw took place on 26 October at 7pm at the club house of the FA Charter Standard Community Club Thackley Juniors F.C. based in Thackley in West Yorkshire, and was broadcast live on BBC Two and BBC Radio 5 Live.

| 7 November 2015 R1 | Plymouth Argyle | 0–2 | Carlisle United | Plymouth |
| 15:00 | | Report | Sweeney 23'; Hope 41' | Stadium: Home Park; Attendance: 6,005; Referee: Charles Breakspear |

| 5 December 2015 R2 | Welling United | 0–5 | Carlisle United | Welling, London |
| 14:00 | | Report | Wyke 18', 71', 90'; Sweeney 45'; Grainger 67' (pen.) | Stadium: Park View Road; Attendance: 2,028; Referee: Simon Hooper |

| 10 January 2016 R3 | Carlisle United | 2–2 | Yeovil Town | Blackpool |
| 14:00 | Grainger 25'; Ellis 76' | Report | Zoko 71'; Jeffers 90+3' | Stadium: Bloomfield Road; Attendance: 3,357; Referee: Andy Madley |
Note: Match was moved to Bloomfield Road due to the state of the home ground after flooding from the Storm Desmond

| 19 January 2016 R3 Replay | Yeovil Town | 1–1 (a.e.t.) (4–5 p) | Carlisle United | Yeovil |
| 19:45 | Compton 31' | Report | Sweeney 77' | Stadium: Huish Park; Attendance: 4,114; Referee: Tim Robinson |
| | Penalties |
| | Dickson (penalty scored); Jeffers (penalty scored); Tozer (penalty scored); Dawson (penalty scored); Dolan (penalty missed) | | Kennedy (penalty scored); Sweeney (penalty scored); Wyke (penalty scored); Ibehre (penalty scored); Ellis (penalty scored) |

| 31 January 2016 R4 | Carlisle United | 0–3 | Everton | Carlisle |
| 13:30 | | Report | Koné 2'; Lennon 14'; Barkley 65' | Stadium: Brunton Park; Attendance: 17,101; Referee: Lee Mason |

=== League Cup ===
On 16 June 2015, the first round draw was made, Carlisle United were drawn at home against Chesterfield. The second round saw Carlisle draw Queens Park Rangers away.

| 11 August 2015 R1 | Carlisle United | 3–1 (a.e.t.) | Chesterfield | Carlisle |
| 19:45 BST | Ibehre 76', 108'; Osei 120+2' | Report | Dieseruvwe 84' | Stadium: Brunton Park; Attendance: 2,950; Referee: Seb Stockbridge |

| 25 August 2015 R2 | Queens Park Rangers | 1–2 | Carlisle United | London |
| 19:45 BST | Emmanuel-Thomas 40' | Report | Asamoah 37'; Kennedy 79' | Stadium: Loftus Road Stadium; Attendance: 5,501; Referee: James Linington |

| 21 September 2015 R3 | Liverpool | 1–1 (a.e.t.) (3–2 p) | Carlisle United | Liverpool |
| 20:00 BST | Ings 23' | | Asamoah 34' | Stadium: Anfield; Attendance: 42,518; Referee: Andrew Madley |
| | Penalties |
| | Milner (penalty scored); Can (penalty scored); Lallana (penalty missed); Coutinho (penalty missed); Ings (penalty scored) | | Grainger (penalty missed); Dicker (penalty scored); Joyce (penalty missed); Beck (penalty scored); Hery (penalty missed) |

=== Football League Trophy ===
On 8 August 2015, live on Soccer AM the draw for the first round of the Football League Trophy was drawn by Toni Duggan and Alex Scott. Carlisle travelled to Port Vale and were defeated in the first round.

| 1 September 2015 R1 | Port Vale | 1–0 | Carlisle United | Burslem |
| 19:45 BST | Ikpeazu 69' | Report | | Stadium: Vale Park; Attendance: 2,571; Referee: Darren England |
