= Kevin Wright (footballer, born 1995) =

Sierra Leonean footballer

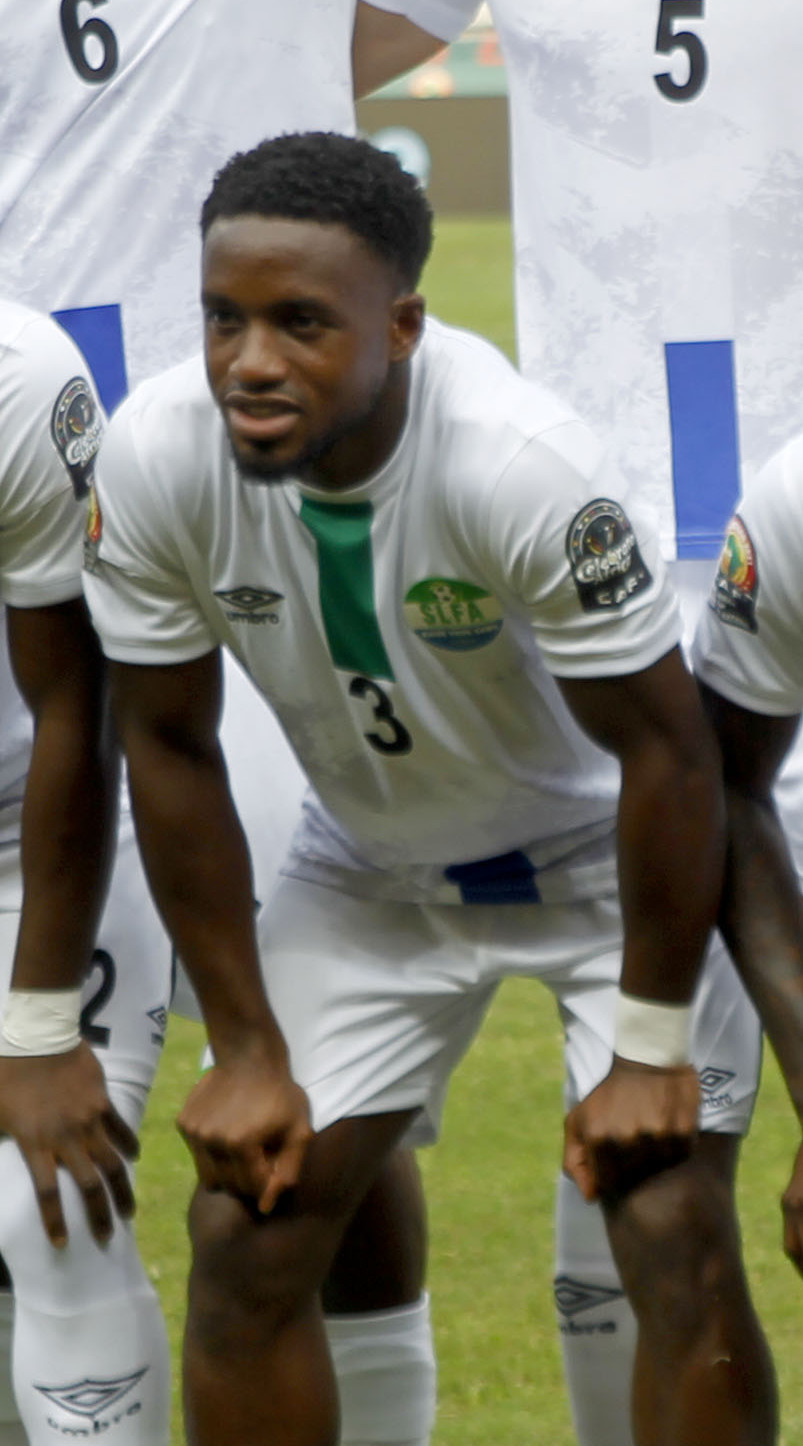
- Wright in 2022

Personal information
- Full name: Kevin Adrian Wright
- Date of birth: 28 December 1995 (age 30)
- Place of birth: Ilford, Essex, England
- Position: Left back

Youth career
- 2005–2016: Chelsea

Senior career*
| Years | Team | Apps | (Gls) |
| 2016–2017 | Carlisle United | 2 | (0) |
| 2017–2018 | Fredrikstad | 5 | (0) |
| 2017 | → Degerfors (loan) | 8 | (0) |
| 2018–2019 | Degerfors | 30 | (5) |
| 2019–2021 | Örebro | 68 | (1) |
| 2022 | Sirius | 8 | (0) |
| 2022 | Apollon Smyrnis | 2 | (0) |
| 2023 | Oakland Roots | 9 | (0) |
| 2024 | Sittingbourne | 0 | (0) |
| 2024 | Saffron Walden Town | 1 | (1) |

International career^{‡}
| 2020–2022 | Sierra Leone | 8 | (0) |
- * Club domestic league appearances and goals as of 10:50, 21 February 2025 (UTC) ‡ National team caps and goals as of 21:00, 13 June 2022 (UTC)

Kevin Adrian Wright (born 12 December 1995) is a professional footballer who plays as a left back. Born in England, Wright plays for the Sierra Leone national team.

== Career ==
Wright joined Chelsea's academy in 2005 as an under-11. He went on to play for the club's development squad between 2014 and 2016. On 30 June 2016, Chelsea announced that Wright would be leaving the London-based club on the expiry of his contract.

On 1 December 2016, after trialing with Cumbrian side Carlisle United for several weeks, he was finally recruited by manager Keith Curle, along with former Tottenham Hotspur trainee Alexander McQueen on a contract until 1 January 2017. Five days later, Wright made his Carlisle debut in a 3–2 defeat against Mansfield Town in the EFL Trophy, in which he replaced the injured Joe McKee at half-time. On 19 January 2017, it was announced that Carlisle had terminated Wright's contract.

On 27 January 2017, Wright joined Norwegian side Fredrikstad, following his release from Carlisle.

On 2 March 2022, Wright signed a three-year contract with Sirius in Sweden.

In August 2022, Wright joined Greek Super League 2 club Apollon Smyrnis.

On 18 January 2023, Wright signed with USL Championship side Oakland Roots SC.

In October 2024, Wright joined Isthmian League South East Division club Sittingbourne. The following month, Wright joined Essex Senior League side Saffron Walden Town.

== International career ==
Born in England, Wright is of Sierra Leonean descent. He debuted with the Sierra Leone national football team in a friendly 2–1 loss to Mauritania on 9 October 2020.

== Career statistics ==
As of match played 6 December 2020

Appearances and goals by club, season and competition
| Club | Season | League | | | National Cup | | League Cup | | Other | | Total | |
| Club | Season | Division | Apps | Goals | Apps | Goals | Apps | Goals | Apps | Goals | Apps | Goals |
|---|---|---|---|---|---|---|---|---|---|---|---|---|
| Carlisle United | 2016–17 | League Two | 2 | 0 | 0 | 0 | — | | 1 (Note: Appearance in the EFL Trophy) | 0 | 3 | 0 |
| Fredrikstad | 2017 | 1. divisjon | 5 | 0 | 1 | 0 | — | | — | | 6 | 0 |
| Degerfors (loan) | 2017 | Superettan | 8 | 0 | 1 | 0 | — | | — | | 9 | 0 |
| Degerfors | 2018 | Superettan | 30 | 5 | 3 | 0 | — | | — | | 33 | 5 |
| Degerfors | 2019 | Superettan | 0 | 0 | 3 | 0 | — | | — | | 3 | 0 |
| Degerfors | Total | | 30 | 5 | 6 | 0 | — | | — | | 36 | 5 |
| Örebro | 2019 | Allsvenskan | 26 | 1 | 1 | 0 | — | | — | | 27 | 1 |
| Örebro | 2020 | Allsvenskan | 27 | 0 | 4 | 0 | — | | — | | 31 | 0 |
| Örebro | 2021 | Allsvenskan | 0 | 0 | 0 | 0 | — | | — | | 0 | 0 |
| Örebro | Total | | 53 | 1 | 5 | 0 | — | | — | | 58 | 1 |
| Career total | | | 98 | 6 | 13 | 0 | 0 | 0 | 1 | 0 | 112 | 6 |

== Honours ==
Chelsea Reserves

- FA Youth Cup: 2013–14
