= David Atkinson (footballer) =

English footballer (born 1993)

Personal information
- Full name: David Atkinson
- Date of birth: 27 April 1993 (age 33)
- Place of birth: Shildon, England
- Height: 5 ft 9 in (1.75 m)
- Position: Defender

Youth career
- 20??–2014: Middlesbrough

Senior career*
Years	Team	Apps	(Gls)
2014–2015	Middlesbrough	0	(0)
2015	→ Hartlepool United (loan)	0	(0)
2015	→ Carlisle United (loan)	7	(0)
2015–2017	Carlisle United	25	(0)
2016–2017	→ Blyth Spartans (loan)		
2017	Blyth Spartans		
2017	ÍBV	10	(0)
2017–2018	Blyth Spartans	21	(0)
2018	ÍBV	16	(0)
2019	Blyth Spartans	9	(0)
2019–2021	Darlington	12	(0)
2021–	Shildon	50	(2)

International career
2008–2009	England U16	4	(0)
2010	England U17	2	(0)
- * Club domestic league appearances and goals as of 15:10, 6 March 2023 (UTC)

David Atkinson (born 27 April 1993) is an English footballer who plays as a defender for Northern League Division One club Shildon. He played in the Football League for Carlisle United.

== Club career ==
Atkinson joined Middlesbrough's academy as an under-nine. He was a member of the Middlesbrough under-15 squad that won the English qualifying competition for the 2007–08 Manchester United Premier Cup, and took up a two-year scholarship with the club in 2009. After the first twelve months, he was given his first professional contract, of four years; at that time, he was recovering from a stress fracture in his back, and his progress was later disrupted by a serious knee injury. He went on to captain Middlesbrough's under-21 team, and in the second half of the 2013–14 season, was a regular member of the first-team squad. After eight consecutive Championship matches on the bench, Middlesbrough manager Aitor Karanka said that Atkinson was training well and was in his thoughts for a debut, but would not force him into a "difficult game" that might adversely affect his confidence. He remained unused, and in September 2014, still without having played first-team football for Middlesbrough, joined League Two club Hartlepool United on a month's loan. He lost time to a hamstring injury, the manager who signed him, Colin Cooper, resigned in the middle of his loan spell, and he made no senior appearances.

He spent time on trial with League One club Walsall in February 2015, brought in by manager Dean Smith to check him out ahead of a possible summer signing – according to Smith, "He is someone [Middlesbrough] have thought highly of, but has not quite burst onto the first team scene as they would have liked. – before signing for Carlisle United of League Two on loan on 26 March. It was with Carlisle that he finally made his Football League debut, on 28 March in a 2–1 loss away to Oxford United, and he made six more appearances. At the end of a 2014–15 season in which Middlesbrough's under-21s won the U21 Premier League Second Division title and added the North Riding Senior Cup, beating Guisborough Town in the final, Atkinson was not offered a new contract.

On 4 June 2015, Atkinson signed a short-term deal with Carlisle United. Six months later, he extended his contract until June 2017.

On 1 December 2016, Atkinson joined Blyth Spartans on loan for a month. The loan was initially extended, and then made permanent when Atkinson left Carlisle by mutual consent. He also spent time playing in Iceland for ÍBV, with which he won the 2017 Icelandic Cup and played in the UEFA Europa League.

Atkinson joined Darlington for the 2019–20 season, but ankle ligaments damaged during pre-season restricted his appearances. He left the club after the abandoned 2020–21 National League North season, and signed for Shildon.

== International career ==
Atkinson made his debut for the England under-16 team on 28 November 2008. He played the first half of the 2–0 win against Scotland that confirmed England as winners of that year's Victory Shield. Although not originally selected for the Montaigu Tournament in 2009, he came into the squad after Nico Yennaris withdrew, and started two of the three group matches and played the whole of the final, in which England U16 beat Germany on penalties to successfully defend their title.

Atkinson was named in the England under-17 squad for matches against France, Ukraine and hosts Portugal at the Algarve Tournament in February 2010. He played in two matches to help England finish as runners-up. He was placed on standby for the England under-18s' friendly against Italy in April 2011, but was not needed.

== Career statistics ==
As of match played 4 March 2023

Appearances and goals by club, season and competition
Club	Season	League			National cup (Note: Includes FA Cup, Icelandic Cup)		League Cup		Other		Total	
Club	Season	Division	Apps	Goals	Apps	Goals	Apps	Goals	Apps	Goals	Apps	Goals
Middlesbrough	2013–14	Championship	0	0	0	0	0	0	—		0	0
Middlesbrough	2014–15	Championship	0	0	0	0	0	0	—		0	0
Middlesbrough	Total		0	0	0	0	0	0	—		0	0
Hartlepool United (loan)	2014–15	League Two	0	0	—		—		0	0	0	0
Carlisle United (loan)	2014–15	League Two	7	0	—		—		—		7	0
Carlisle United	2015–16	League Two	24	0	4	0	1	0	0	0	29	0
Carlisle United	2016–17	League Two	1	0	0	0	1	0	0	0	2	0
Carlisle United	Total		32	0	4	0	2	0	0	0	38	0
Blyth Spartans	2016–17	Northern Premier League (NPL); Premier Division										
ÍBV	2017	Úrvalsdeild	10	0	2	0	—		—		12	0
Blyth Spartans	2017–18	National League North	21	0			—				21	0
ÍBV	2018	Úrvalsdeild	16	0	1	0	—		2 (Note: Appearances in UEFA Europa League)	0	19	0
Blyth Spartans	2018–19	National League North	9	0			—				9	0
Darlington	2019–20	National League North	7	0	0	0	—		0	0	7	0
Darlington	2020–21	National League North	5	0	3	0	—		0	0	8	0
Darlington	Total		12	0	3	0	—		0	0	15	0
Shildon	2021–22	NPL East Division	29	1	3	1	—		4 (Note: Two appearances in FA Trophy, one in Durham Challenge Cup, one in Northern Premier League play-offs)	0	36	2
Shildon	2022–23	NPL Division One East	21	1	2	0	—		2 (Note: One appearance in FA Trophy, one in Durham Challenge Cup)	0	26	1
Shildon	Total		50	2	5	1	—		6	0	61	3
Career total			150	2	15	1	2	0	8	0	175	3
