= Mark Gillespie (footballer) =

English footballer (born 1992)

- Gillespie with Newcastle United in 2026

Personal information
- Full name: Mark Joseph Gillespie
- Date of birth: 27 March 1992 (age 34)
- Place of birth: Newcastle upon Tyne, England
- Height: 6 ft 3 in (1.91 m)
- Position: Goalkeeper

Team information
- Current team: Newcastle United
- Number: 29

Youth career
- 2000–2008: Newcastle United
- 2008–2010: Carlisle United

Senior career*
Years	Team	Apps	(Gls)
2010–2017	Carlisle United	161	(0)
2010–2011	→ Blyth Spartans (loan)	9	(0)
2017–2018	Walsall	23	(0)
2018–2020	Motherwell	57	(0)
2020–	Newcastle United	0	(0)
- * Club domestic league appearances and goals as of 18:25, 7 March 2020 (UTC)

Mark Joseph Gillespie (born 27 March 1992) is an English professional footballer who plays as a goalkeeper for Premier League club Newcastle United.

== Club career ==
=== Early career ===
Gillespie was part of the academy setup at Newcastle United before moving to Carlisle United in 2008, at the age of 16. He started at Carlisle as a youth team player before graduating to the reserve team.

=== Carlisle United ===
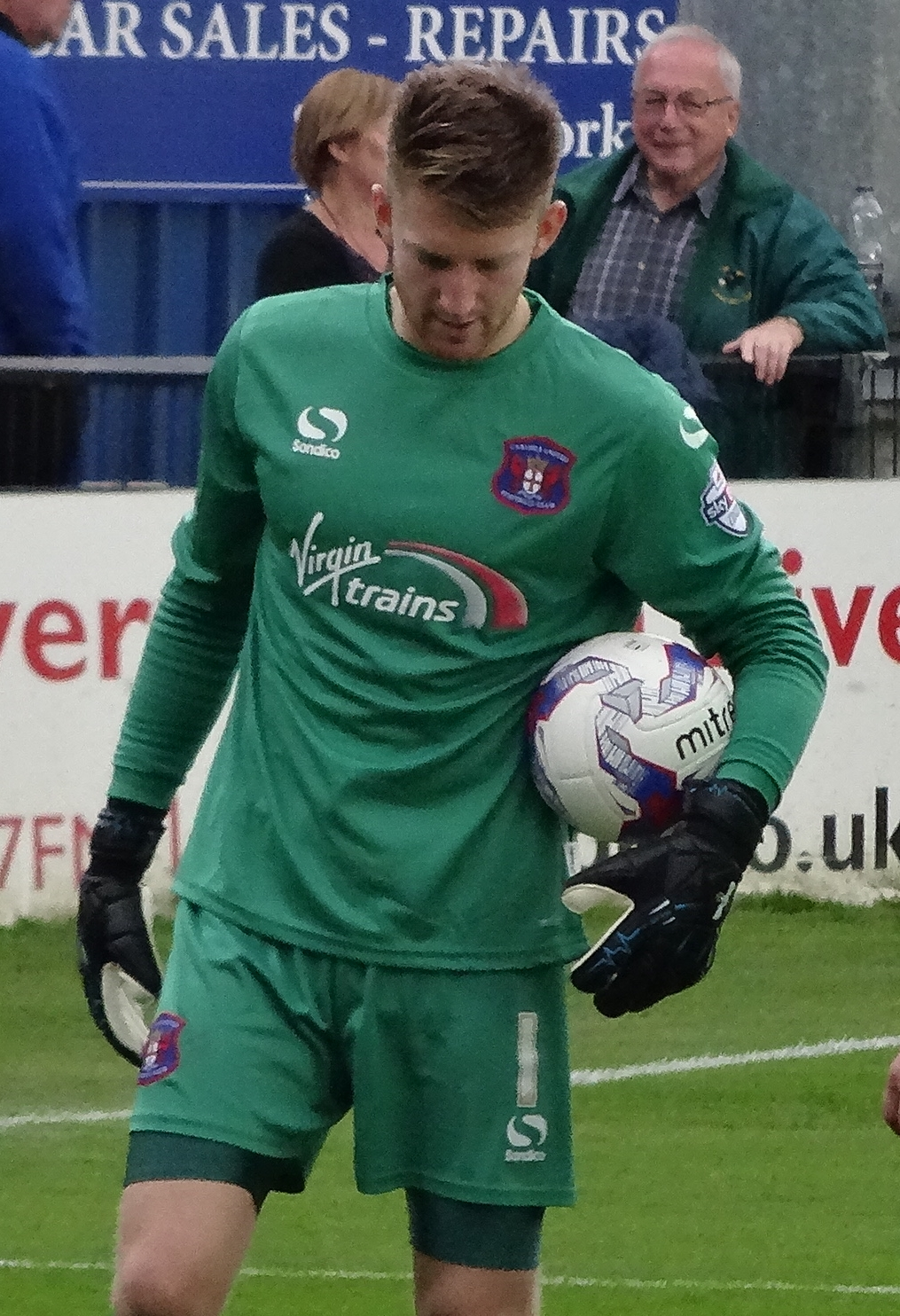
Gillespie playing for Carlisle United in 2015

On 20 February 2010, Gillespie was named as a substitute for Carlisle's League One match against Swindon Town due to an injury suffered by Lenny Pidgeley. He was on the bench for a further seven games before Pidgeley returned for the 2010 Football League Trophy final on 28 March 2010.

On 8 May 2010, the final day of the 2009–10 season, Gillespie made his professional debut in a win against Norwich City at Carrow Road after coming on as a late substitute. Gillespie therefore became the youngest keeper ever to represent Carlisle, at 18 years and 42 days, beating the previous record set by Tony Caig.

In the 2010–11 season, Gillespie joined Blyth Spartans, then in the Conference North, on a month-long loan. He made his first start against Eastwood Town on 16 October 2010, keeping a clean sheet. His loan was extended for a further two months before he returned to Carlisle. He made no appearances for Carlisle in either of the 2010–11 or 2011–12 seasons.

Gillespie made his first start for Carlisle in Carlisle's Football League Trophy tie against Preston North End on 4 September 2012. This ended a run of 146 consecutive starts for Adam Collin. Gillespie retained his place in the team the following Saturday, in a league fixture against Hartlepool United, after Carlisle manager Greg Abbott said that Gillespie and Collin were competing against each other for the goalkeeping position.

Gillespie was praised by Tottenham Hotspur boss André Villas-Boas and veteran keeper Carlo Cudicini after Carlisle slipped to a 3–0 defeat in a League Cup tie on 26 September. The praise was earned after Gillespie pulled off a string of fine saves to keep United in the match early on. Gillespie lost his place in the first team at the start of November 2012, after playing 13 consecutive games in two months, during which he conceded 23 goals and kept only one clean sheet (in a game against Crewe Alexandra on 18 September 2012).

He regained his place in the team one and a half months later in a 2–1 loss at Shrewsbury Town and retained it to make 37 appearances for the season. During the season, he extended his contract until the end of the 2014–15 season, while at the season's end, Collin departed the club for Rotherham United.

Gillespie's 2013–14 season was curtailed by a knee injury suffered in an FA Cup tie against Boreham Wood in November. He made no further appearances for Carlisle during the season, as the club was relegated to League Two.

Gillespie turned down a new contract from Carlisle on 7 June 2017, instead moving on to Walsall in League One.

=== Walsall ===
On 23 June 2017, Gillespie joined League One side Walsall on a two-year contract.

=== Motherwell ===
On 5 June 2018, Gillespie signed for Scottish Premiership club Motherwell on a two-year deal. He made his debut on 17 July 2018, in a Scottish League Cup group stage match at home to Edinburgh City, but was backup to Trevor Carson in league matches until November 2018 when Carson was ruled out with deep vein thrombosis. During the season Gillespie saved a penalty on four occasions; at home against Celtic, two in matches against St Johnstone, and at home to Livingston in the final game of the season. On 31 May 2020, Motherwell announced that Gillespie (who had been ever-present that season) would be leaving the club after his contract expired.

=== Newcastle United ===
On 3 July 2020, Newcastle United announced the signing of Gillespie on a three-year contract, returning to the club after twelve years. His first team action has been limited to three League Cup appearances in 2020/21 but has appeared on the bench, most notably in the League Cup Final in 2023 with Nick Pope suspended, Martin Dubravka cup-tied and Karl Darlow away on loan.

On 30 May 2024, the club announced it had extended the player's contract by a year.

On 6 June 2025, Gillespie signed a further one-year contract with Newcastle. On 3 June 2026, the club announced he had signed another one-year extension.

== Career statistics ==
As of 1 February 2023

Appearances and goals by club, season and competition
Club	Season	League			National cup (Note: Includes FA Cup, Scottish Cup)		League cup (Note: Includes Football League/EFL Cup, Scottish League Cup)		Europe		Other		Total	
Club	Season	Division	Apps	Goals	Apps	Goals	Apps	Goals	Apps	Goals	Apps	Goals	Apps	Goals
Carlisle United	2009–10	League One	1	0	0	0	0	0	—		0	0	1	0
Carlisle United	2010–11	League One	0	0	0	0	0	0	—		0	0	0	0
Carlisle United	2011–12	League One	0	0	0	0	0	0	—		0	0	0	0
Carlisle United	2012–13	League One	35	0	0	0	1	0	—		1 (Note: Appearances in the Football League Trophy)	0	37	0
Carlisle United	2013–14	League One	15	0	1	0	2	0	—		1	0	19	0
Carlisle United	2014–15	League Two	19	0	0	0	1	0	—		1	0	21	0
Carlisle United	2015–16	League Two	45	0	2	0	3	0	—		0	0	50	0
Carlisle United	2016–17	League Two	46	0	2	0	2	0	—		2 (Note: Appearances in the League Two play-offs)	0	52	0
Carlisle United	Total		161	0	5	0	9	0	—		5	0	180	0
Blyth Spartans (loan)	2010–11	Conference North	9	0	0	0	—		—		2 (Note: Appearances in the FA Trophy)	0	11	0
Walsall	2017–18	League One	23	0	1	0	1	0	—		0	0	25	0
Motherwell	2018–19	Scottish Premiership	27	0	1	0	1	0	—		—		29	0
Motherwell	2019–20	Scottish Premiership	30	0	4	0	6	0	—		—		38	0
Motherwell	Total		57	0	5	0	7	0	—		—		67	0
Newcastle United	2020–21	Premier League	0	0	0	0	3	0	—		—		3	0
Newcastle United	2021–22	Premier League	0	0	0	0	0	0	—		—		0	0
Newcastle United	2022–23	Premier League	0	0	0	0	0	0	—		—		0	0
Newcastle United	2023–24	Premier League	0	0	0	0	0	0	0	0	—		0	0
Newcastle United	2024–25	Premier League	0	0	0	0	0	0	—		—		0	0
Newcastle United	2025–26	Premier League	0	0	0	0	0	0	0	0	—		0	0
Newcastle United	Total		0	0	0	0	3	0	0	0	—		3	0
Newcastle United U-21s	2021–22	—	—		—		—		—		1	0	1	0
Career total			239	0	10	0	19	0	0	0	8	0	287	0

== Honours ==
Newcastle United

- EFL Cup: 2024–25; runner-up: 2022–23
