= Tom Miller (footballer, born 1990) =

English footballer

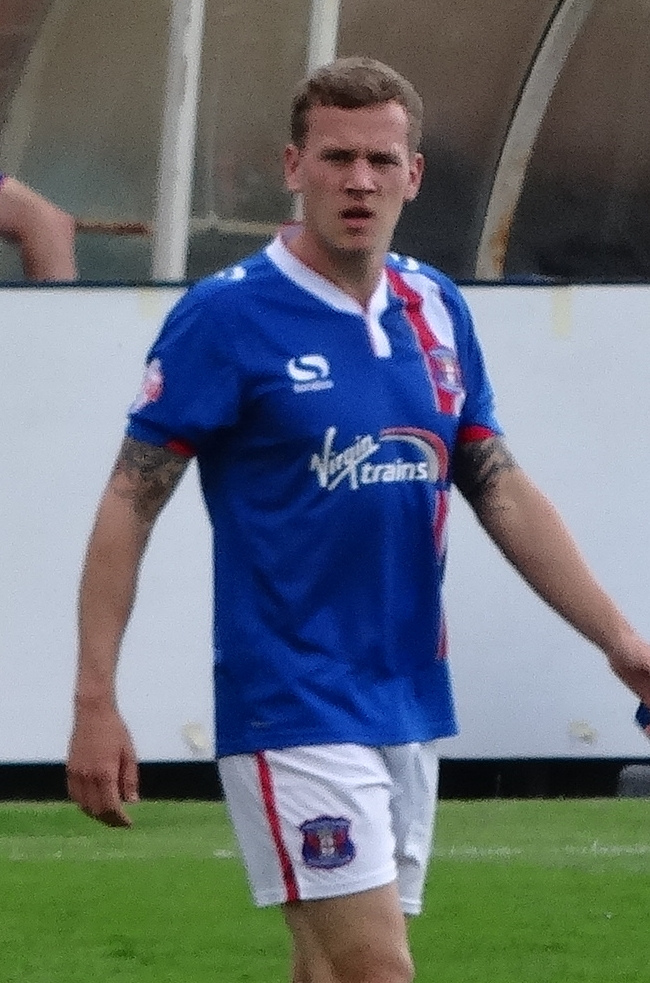
- Miller playing for Carlisle United in 2015

Personal information
- Full name: Thomas Patrick Miller
- Date of birth: 29 June 1990 (age 36)
- Place of birth: Ely, England
- Height: 6 ft 0 in (1.83 m)
- Position: Right back

Team information
- Current team: Stalybridge Celtic

Youth career
- 2006–2008: Norwich City

Senior career*
Years	Team	Apps	(Gls)
2008–2010	Rangers	0	(0)
2009–2010	→ Brechin City (loan)	0	(0)
2010–2011	Dundalk	33	(1)
2011–2012	Newport County	37	(1)
2012	→ Lincoln City (loan)	8	(1)
2012–2015	Lincoln City	103	(10)
2015–2018	Carlisle United	87	(7)
2018–2019	Bury	7	(0)
2020	AFC Fylde	3	(0)
2020–2022	Radcliffe	35	(0)
2022–	Stalybridge Celtic	0	(0)
- * Club domestic league appearances and goals as of 15:20, 3 May 2022 (UTC)

Thomas Patrick Miller (born 29 June 1990) is an English professional footballer who plays as a defender for Stalybridge Celtic.

He has formerly played for Dundalk, Newport County, Lincoln City, Carlisle United and Bury.

== Career ==
Miller began his career as a youth player at Norwich City but the club's then manager Glenn Roeder did not offer him a professional deal at the end of his two-year scholarship. Upon hearing the news, Miller spoke with the club's former assistant manager Jim Duffy who recommended him to Rangers. The Ibrox-based club scouted Miller in the Football League exit trials and were suitably impressed to sign him to a two-year professional contract.

Miller's progress at Rangers was hindered by a series of injuries as he damaged his cruciate ligament and broke bones in both of his feet. In December 2009, he reunited with Jim Duffy, who signed him on a month's loan for Brechin City. He debuted for the club as a substitute in their 1–0 defeat at Ayr United in the fourth round of the Scottish Cup on 18 January 2010 but this would prove to be his only appearance for Brechin as inclement weather meant it was their only game played during his loan period.

After a successful trial period, Miller agreed an initial one-year contract to join Dundalk in February 2010. He spent the 2011–12 season with Conference Premier side Newport County making 37 league appearances where he most notably injured Bolton star Lee Chung-Yong in a pre-season friendly. Miller then joined League rivals Lincoln City in 2012 and made over 100 appearances for the Imps before leaving the club in May 2015 and joining League Two side Carlisle United in June. He made his Football League debut on 8 August 2015 in a 1–1 draw away at Mansfield Town.

At the end of the 2017–18 season, Miller was released by Carlisle. In July 2018, he joined Bury on a two-year contract. He left Bury following their expulsion from League One.

He joined AFC Fylde in February 2020, signing a contract until the end of the season. On 1 October 2020, he then joined Radcliffe on a deal for the 2020–21 season. In July 2022, Miller joined Stalybridge Celtic.

== Career statistics ==
As of 15 March 2019

Appearances and goals by club, season and competition
Club	Season	League			National Cup		League Cup		Other		Total	
Club	Season	Division	Apps	Goals	Apps	Goals	Apps	Goals	Apps	Goals	Apps	Goals
Brechin City (loan)	2009–10	Scottish Second Division	0	0	1	0	0	0	0	0	1	0
Dundalk	2010	League of Ireland Premier Division	33	1	0	0	0	0	4 (Note: Appearances in UEFA Europa League.)	0	37	1
Newport County	2010–11	Conference Premier	13	1	0	0	—		0	0	13	1
Newport County	2011–12	Conference Premier	24	0	1	0	—		3 (Note: Two appearances in FA Trophy; one in Welsh Cup.)	0	28	0
Lincoln City (loan)	2011–12	Conference Premier	8	1	0	0	—		0	0	8	1
Lincoln City	2012–13	Conference Premier	38	1	6	0	—		1 (Note: Appearances in FA Trophy.)	0	45	1
Lincoln City	2013–14	Conference Premier	38	5	4	0	—		3	0	45	5
Lincoln City	2014–15	Conference Premier	27	4	3	0	—		1	0	31	4
Carlisle United	2015–16	League Two	29	5	2	0	3	0	1 (Note: Appearances in EFL Trophy.)	0	35	5
Carlisle United	2016–17	League Two	41	0	2	0	2	0	6 (Note: Four appearances in EFL Trophy; two in EFL League Two play-offs.)	1	51	1
Carlisle United	2017–18	League Two	17	2	2	0	1	1	2	0	22	3
Bury	2018–19	League Two	7	0	2	0	1	0	5	0	15	0
Career total			275	20	23	0	7	1	26	1	331	22
