= Michael Raynes =

English footballer and coach

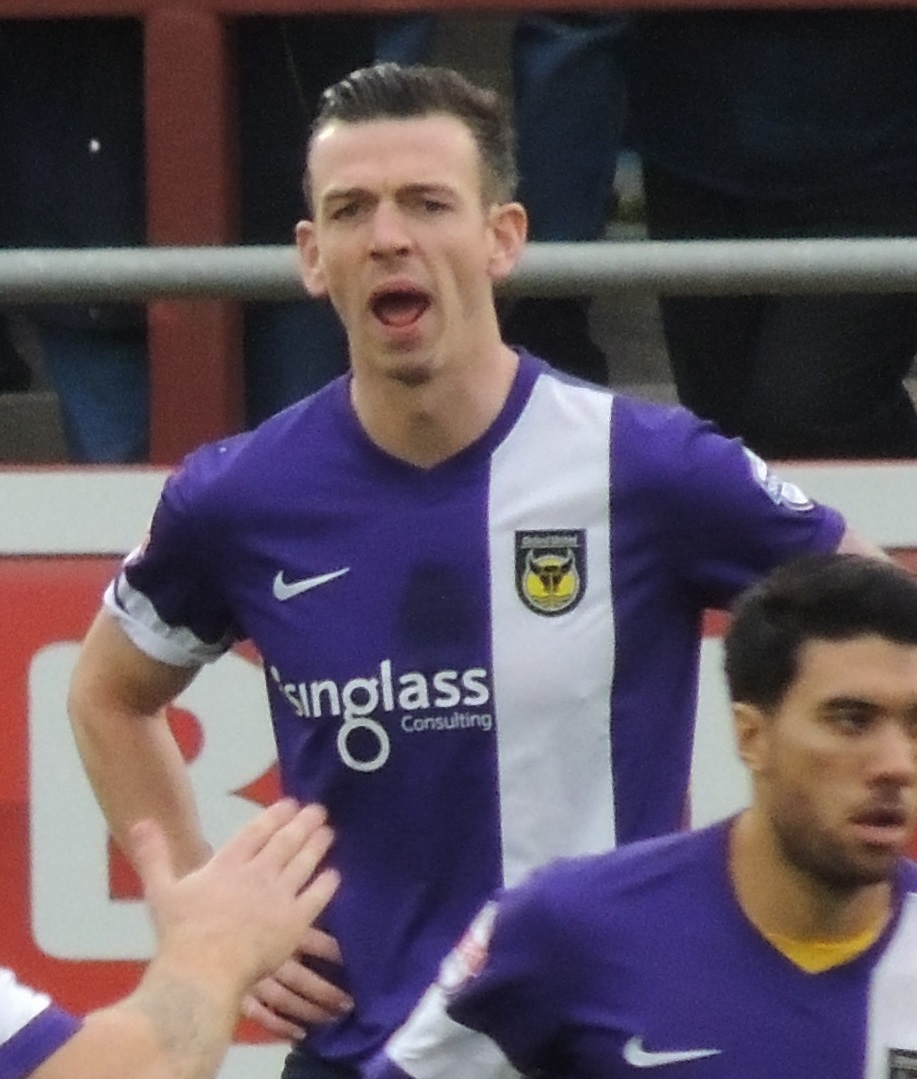
- Raynes playing for Oxford United in 2013

Personal information
- Full name: Michael Bernard Raynes
- Date of birth: 15 October 1987 (age 39)
- Place of birth: Wythenshawe, England
- Height: 6 ft 4 in (1.93 m)
- Position: Centre-back

Youth career
- –2004: Stockport County

Senior career*
Years	Team	Apps	(Gls)
2004–2010	Stockport County	153	(6)
2010–2011	Scunthorpe United	34	(0)
2011–2012	Rotherham United	33	(0)
2012–2015	Oxford United	69	(1)
2015	Mansfield Town	10	(0)
2015–2017	Carlisle United	71	(5)
2017–2019	Crewe Alexandra	34	(2)
2019	→ Hartlepool United (loan)	3	(0)
2019–2020	Hartlepool United	28	(0)
2020–2022	Ashton United	22	(1)
2022–2023	Stockport Town	15	(3)
Total		480	(19)
- * Club domestic league appearances and goals

Michael Bernard Raynes (born 15 October 1987) is an English former professional footballer who played as a centre-back.

== Career ==
Born in Wythenshawe, Greater Manchester, Raynes began his career as a trainee at Stockport County. He made his debut in a 2–1 FA Cup second round replay defeat at Swansea City in December 2004, two months after his 17th birthday, and became a regular in the first team during the second half of the 2004–05 season. By the end of the 2007–08 season, he had made over 90 league and cup appearances for Stockport. He signed a new contract in January 2008, keeping him at Stockport until 2010.

He signed a 2 1/2-year contract with Scunthorpe United on 1 February 2010, for an undisclosed fee.

He joined Rotherham United but was transfer-listed by the club in May 2012, and left by mutual consent later in the same month.

He signed a contract with Oxford United on 11 July 2012.

At the end of 2014–15 season Raynes was released by Mansfield Town after only making a handful of appearances for the club since joining in January 2015. However, he was not a free agent for long as on 20 May 2015 Raynes was signed by Carlisle United by manager Keith Curle on a one-year contract. Raynes smashed home a brace in a 3–2 home victory against League Two strugglers Yeovil Town in October.

In May 2017, he signed a two-year contract with Crewe Alexandra, after turning down a new offer at Brunton Park. Playing against Carlisle on 23 September 2017, Raynes gave away a penalty and scored an own goal as his former team won 5–0. On 17 October 2017, he scored his first goal for Crewe, at Gresty Road against Notts County, but was sent off in his next game, a defeat by Accrington Stanley.

In January 2019, after just six first-team appearances in his second season for Crewe, he was signed on loan by Hartlepool United until the end of the season. Raynes made just three appearances after Hartlepool after succumbing to injury following a 1–1 draw with Leyton Orient on 9 February 2019. At the end of the 2018–19 season, Raynes was released by Crewe, and having done enough to impress in his brief loan spell, signed for Hartlepool on a permanent basis on 23 May 2019. Raynes was released at the end of the 2019–20 season.

== Personal life ==
He graduated from Manchester Metropolitan University in July 2016 with a bachelor's degree in Sports Science.

== Career statistics ==
=== Club ===
Club	Season	League			FA Cup		League Cup		Other		Total	
Club	Season	Division	Apps	Goals	Apps	Goals	Apps	Goals	Apps	Goals	Apps	Goals
Stockport County	2004–05	League One	19	0	1	0	0	0	0	0	20	0
Stockport County	2005–06	League Two	25	1	3	0	0	0	1 (Note: Appearances in the Football League Trophy)	0	29	1
Stockport County	2006–07	League Two	9	0	0	0	1	0	0	0	10	0
Stockport County	2007–08	League Two	28	0	2	0	0	0	3	0	33	0
Stockport County	2008–09	League One	35	5	3	0	0	0	1	0	39	5
Stockport County	2009–10	League One	25	1	1	0	1	0	1	0	28	1
Stockport County	Total		141	7	10	0	2	0	6	0	159	7
Scunthorpe United	2009–10	Championship	12	0	0	0	0	0	—		12	0
Scunthorpe United	2010–11	Championship	22	0	1	0	2	0	—		25	0
Scunthorpe United	Total		34	0	1	0	2	0	—		37	0
Rotherham United	2011–12	League Two	33	0	1	0	1	0	1	0	36	0
Oxford United	2012–13	League Two	38	1	3	1	2	0	3	0	46	2
Oxford United	2013–14	League Two	27	0	3	0	0	0	1	0	31	0
Oxford United	2014–15	League Two	14	0	0	0	0	0	1	0	15	0
Oxford United	Total		79	1	6	1	2	0	5	0	92	2
Mansfield Town	2014–15	League Two	10	0	0	0	0	0	0	0	10	0
Carlisle United	2015–16	League Two	40	3	5	0	3	0	1	0	49	3
Carlisle United	2016–17	League Two	41	2	2	0	2	0	3 (Note: One appearance in the Football League Trophy and two in the League Two play-offs)	0	48	3
Carlisle United	Total		81	5	7	0	5	0	4	0	97	6
Crewe Alexandra	2017–18	League Two	29	2	2	0	1	0	2	0	34	2
Crewe Alexandra	2018–19	League Two	5	0	0	0	0	0	1	0	6	0
Crewe Alexandra	Total		34	2	2	0	1	0	3	0	40	2
Hartlepool United	2018–19	National League	3	0	0	0	0	0	0	0	3	0
Hartlepool United	2019–20	National League	28	0	5	0	0	0	0	0	33	0
Hartlepool United	Total		31	0	5	0	0	0	0	0	36	0
Ashton United	2020–21	NPL Premier Division	5	1	2	0	0	0	2	1	9	2
Ashton United	2021–22	NPL Premier Division	17	0	1	0	0	0	2	0	20	0
Ashton United	Total		22	1	3	0	0	0	4	1	29	2
Stockport Town	2022–23	North West Counties League; Division One South	15	3	0	0	0	0	3	1	18	4
Career total			480	19	35	1	13	0	26	3	554	23
