= Macaulay Gillesphey =

English footballer (born 1995)

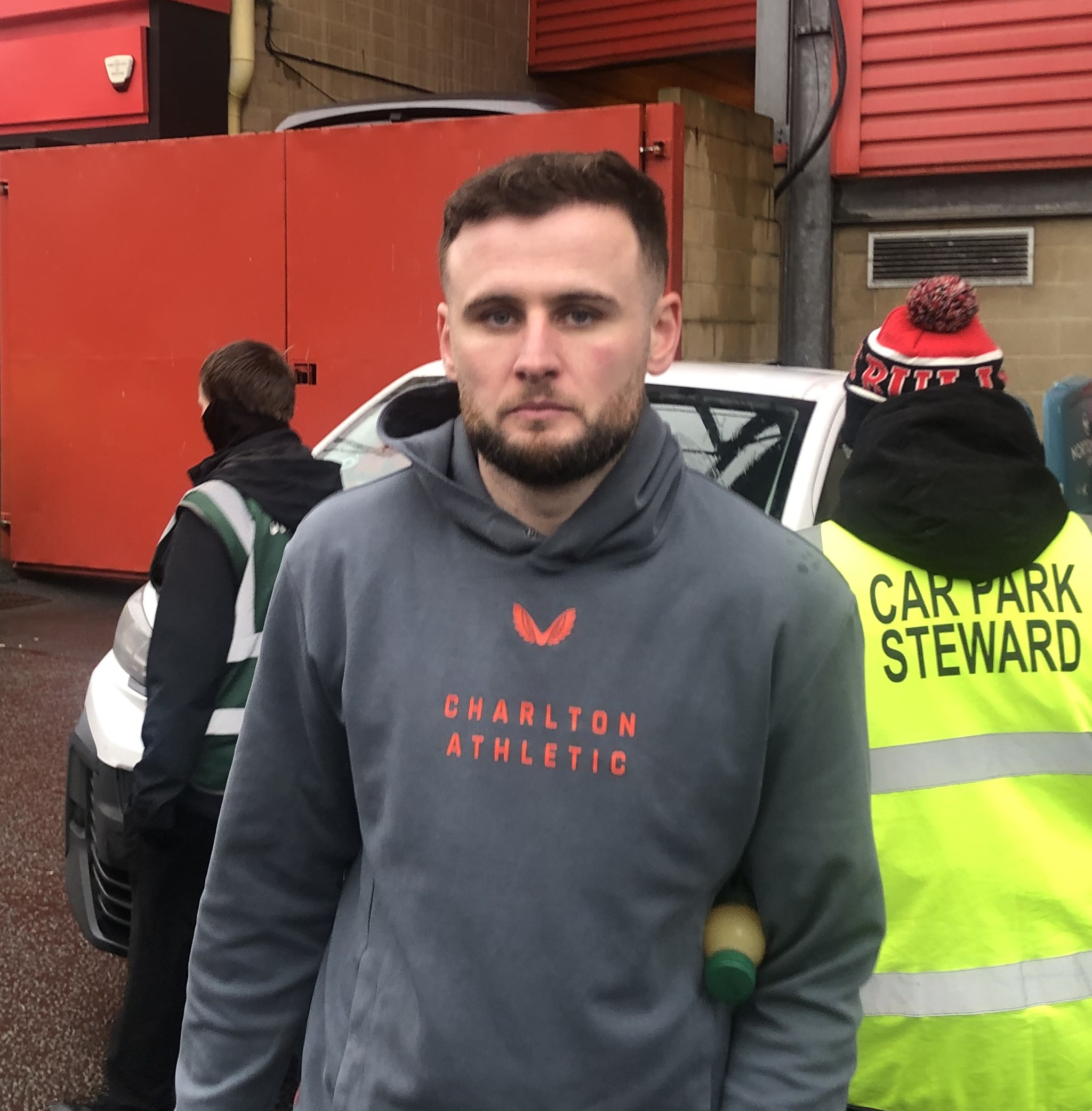
- Gillesphey in 2025

Personal information
- Full name: Macaulay Gillesphey
- Date of birth: 24 November 1995 (age 30)
- Place of birth: Ashington, England
- Height: 6 ft 2 in (1.87 m)
- Position: Defender

Team information
- Current team: Bradford City
- Number: 5

Youth career
- 2011–2015: Newcastle United

Senior career*
Years	Team	Apps	(Gls)
2015–2018	Newcastle United	0	(0)
2015–2016	→ Carlisle United (loan)	23	(2)
2016–2017	→ Carlisle United (loan)	32	(0)
2018–2019	Carlisle United	24	(0)
2019–2021	Brisbane Roar	50	(4)
2021–2024	Plymouth Argyle	79	(3)
2024–2026	Charlton Athletic	96	(7)
2026–	Bradford City	8	(1)
- * Club domestic league appearances and goals as of 17:10, 15 November 2026 (UTC)

Macaulay Gillesphey (born 24 November 1995) is an English professional footballer who plays as a defender for EFL League One club Bradford City.

== Career ==
=== Newcastle United ===
Gillesphey played for Cramlington Juniors before being signed by Newcastle United where he progressed through the youth academy and signed a professional contract in March 2015. Gillesphey made his professional debut on 24 September 2015 in a 1–1 draw away at Liverpool in the League Cup.

==== Carlisle United (loan) ====
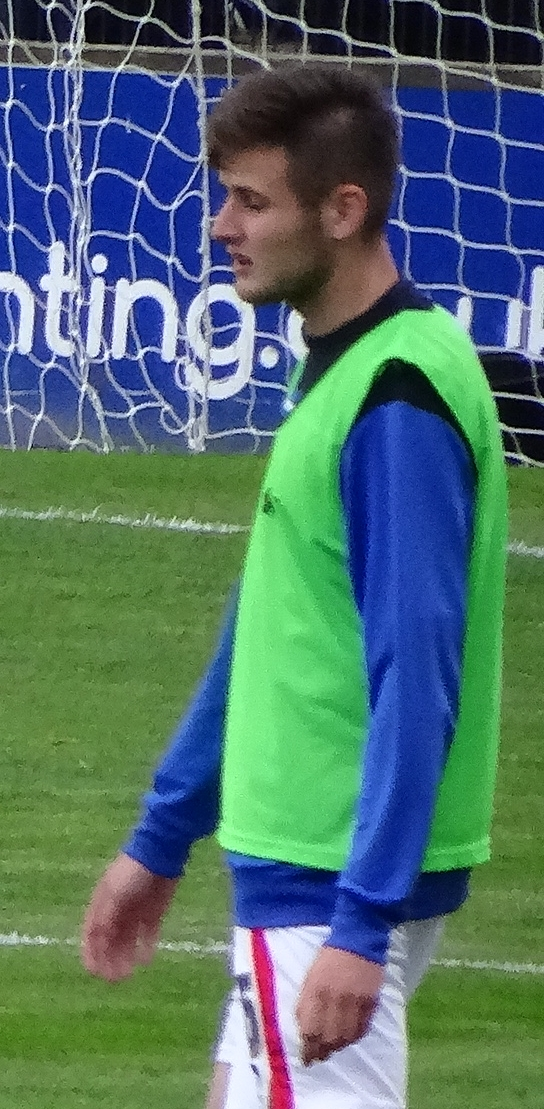
Gillesphey warming up for Carlisle United in 2015.

Gillesphey went out on loan to Carlisle United in September 2015 along with Newcastle teammate Alex Gilliead. On 29 July 2016, Gillesphey re-joined Carlisle United on loan until 2 January 2017, before later extending the deal to the end of the season.

=== Carlisle United ===
Gillesphey re-joined Carlisle United on a permanent basis in June 2018, signing a two-year contract with the club. On 22 May 2019, the club announced a mutual release so that Gillesphey could look for 'a different kind of challenge'.

=== Brisbane Roar ===
On 25 June 2019, the Brisbane Roar announced they had signed Gillesphey. He was the fourth signing made by new manager Robbie Fowler.

On 16 September 2020, Gillesphey was named the Gary Wilkins Medalist for the 2019–20 season.

On 15 June 2021, it was confirmed that Gillesphey had turned down the offer of a new contract at The Roar and would be returning to the UK to sign for a club in England.

=== Plymouth Argyle ===
On 15 June 2021, Plymouth Argyle announced they had signed Gillesphey on a two-year deal after turning down a new contract with Brisbane Roar. He was given additional time off before pre-season due to the late finish of the A-League season.

Gillesphey scored his first goal for Argyle on 5 February 2022 against Chelsea in the fourth round of the FA Cup at Stamford Bridge. The goal gave Argyle an early lead against the reigning European champions in a match they eventually went on lose 2–1 after extra time.

=== Charlton Athletic ===
On 12 January 2024, Gillesphey joined Charlton Athletic on a two-and-a-half-year deal, with the option of an extra year, for an undisclosed fee.

On 25 May 2025, Gillesphey scored from a free-kick in the 1–0 League One play-off final win over Leyton Orient at Wembley Stadium, which promoted Charlton back to the Championship.

On 4 July 2025, Gillesphey signed a new two-year contract with a club option of an additional year.

=== Bradford City ===
On 1 July 2026, Gillesphey joined Bradford City on a two-year deal for an undisclosed fee.

== Career statistics ==
As of match played 7 November 2026

Appearances and goals by club, season and competition
Club	Season	League			National Cup (Note: Includes FA Cup)		League Cup (Note: Includes EFL Cup)		Other		Total	
Club	Season	Division	Apps	Goals	Apps	Goals	Apps	Goals	Apps	Goals	Apps	Goals
Newcastle United	2015–16	Premier League	0	0	0	0	0	0	0	0	0	0
Newcastle United	2016–17	Championship	0	0	0	0	0	0	0	0	0	0
Newcastle United	2017–18	Premier League	0	0	0	0	0	0	3 (Note: Appearances in EFL Trophy)	0	3	0
Newcastle United	Total		0	0	0	0	0	0	3	0	3	0
Carlisle United (loan)	2015–16	League Two	23	2	3	0	1	0	0	0	27	2
Carlisle United (loan)	2016–17	League Two	32	0	0	0	1	0	3	0	36	0
Carlisle United (loan)	Total		55	2	3	0	2	0	3	0	63	2
Carlisle United	2018–19	League Two	24	0	2	0	1	0	3	1	30	1
Brisbane Roar	2019–20	A-League	27	1	0	0	0	0	0	0	27	1
Brisbane Roar	2020–21	A-League	23	3	0	0	0	0	0	0	23	3
Brisbane Roar	Total		50	4	0	0	0	0	0	0	50	4
Plymouth Argyle	2021–22	League One	40	1	4	1	1	0	2	0	47	2
Plymouth Argyle	2022–23	League One	35	2	0	0	1	0	4	0	40	2
Plymouth Argyle	2023–24	Championship	4	0	0	0	0	0	0	0	4	0
Plymouth Argyle	Total		79	3	4	1	2	0	6	0	91	4
Charlton Athletic	2023–24	League One	17	0	—		—		—		17	0
Charlton Athletic	2024–25	League One	44	5	3	0	1	0	6 (Note: Three appearances in the EFL Trophy and three appearances and one goal in the League One play-offs)	1	54	6
Charlton Athletic	2025–26	Championship	35	2	1	0	2	0	—		38	2
Charlton Athletic	Total		96	7	4	0	3	0	6	1	109	8
Bradford City	2026–27	League One	8	1	1	0	4	1	2	0	15	2
Career total			259	17	12	0	11	1	20	2	302	20

== Honours ==
Plymouth Argyle

- EFL League One: 2022–23
- EFL Trophy runner-up: 2022–23

Charlton Athletic

- EFL League One play-offs: 2025

Individual

- Gary Wilkins Medal (Brisbane Roar Player of the Year): 2019–20
