= Connor Hammell =

English footballer

Personal information
- Full name: Connor Rhys Hammell
- Date of birth: 27 September 1996 (age 30)
- Place of birth: Whitehaven, England
- Position: Midfielder

Team information
- Current team: Keswick FC

Youth career
- –2014: Carlisle United

Senior career*
Years	Team	Apps	(Gls)
2014–2016	Carlisle United	3	(0)
2015	→ Whitehaven (loan)		
2016	→ Penrith (loan)		
2016	Workington	0	(0)
2016	Adelaide Comets	0	(0)
2017–	Keswick FC	0	(0)
- * Club domestic league appearances and goals as of 29 December 2014

Connor Rhys Hammell (born 27 September 1996) is an English footballer who plays as a midfielder for Keswick FC in Cumbria. He started his career at Carlisle United and also played for Workington.

== Career ==
A Carlisle United youth graduate, Hammell was promoted to the first team in 2014, being assigned #28 jersey. On 20 December 2014 he made his professional debut, coming on as a 79th minute substitute in a 2–1 home win against Northampton Town. Hammell made his second appearance eight days later, playing the entire second half in a 0–3 home loss against York City. After struggling to get into the squad, Hammell went out on loan to his home town club Whitehaven. After that expired, He went to Penrith on loan. On 10 March 2016, Hammell left Carlisle United by Mutual Consent.

On 11 March 2016, Hammell joined Northern Premier League Premier Division outfit Workington until the end of the 2015–16 season.

After his contract expired at Workington, he went to Australia and signed for Adelaide Comets FC.
