= Alexander McQueen (footballer) =

Footballer (born 1995)

Personal information
- Full name: Alexander Luke Nathanial McQueen
- Date of birth: 24 March 1995 (age 31)
- Place of birth: Romford, England
- Height: 1.89 m (6 ft 2 in)
- Positions: Full-back; central midfielder

Youth career
- –2013: Tottenham Hotspur

Senior career*
| Years | Team | Apps | (Gls) |
| 2013–2015 | Tottenham Hotspur | 0 | (0) |
| 2015–2017 | Carlisle United | 25 | (0) |
| 2018 | PS Kemi | 0 | (0) |
| 2018 | VPS | 10 | (0) |
| 2018–2020 | Dagenham & Redbridge | 58 | (6) |
| 2020–2021 | Barnet | 34 | (1) |
| 2022 | Indy Eleven | 21 | (0) |
| 2023–2024 | Oxford City | 5 | (1) |

International career^{‡}
| 2017– | Grenada | 14 | (1) |
- * Club domestic league appearances and goals as of 17:41, 18 November 2023 (UTC) ‡ National team caps and goals as of 6 June 2022

Alexander Luke Nathanial McQueen (born 24 March 1995) is a professional footballer who plays as a full-back. Born in England, McQueen represents the Grenada national team internationally.

== Club career ==
=== Early career ===
McQueen began his career at the Tottenham Hotspur Academy, but was released by Spurs in 2015 without making a first team appearance at White Hart Lane during his one year as a senior professional.

=== Carlisle United ===
McQueen signed a one-year contract with League Two side Carlisle United in June 2015. He made his debut for the "Cumbrians" on 11 August, in a 3–1 League Cup First round win over Chesterfield at Brunton Park. After beating Queens Park Rangers 2–1 in the second round of the League Cup, McQueen was an integral part of the Carlisle team that managed to take Liverpool to penalty shoot-out in the third round of the competition. Despite narrowly missing out on a place in the fourth round of the League Cup, McQueen's performance at Anfield was rewarded by being named in the Team of the Round. McQueen was offered a new deal at the end of 2015–16 season, but finally rejected it on 15 August 2016.

After failing to find a new club, McQueen trained with Carlisle United in September 2016, before re-joining the Cumbrian-based side on 1 December 2016, on a one-month contract.

=== VPS ===
On 16 April 2018, McQueen joined Finnish side VPS despite having signed a one-year contract with PS Kemi a month earlier. The contract included a one-month probation period which saw the contract not continued after the probation period.

=== Dagenham & Redbridge ===
On 9 August 2018, McQueen returned to English football to sign with National League side Dagenham & Redbridge with a contract running until January 2019. He made his debut for the Daggers two days later in the 2–2 draw with Maidenhead United, scoring his first professional goal and the equaliser, shortly after replacing Chike Kandi in the second half. McQueen played 64 times for Daggers in all competitions across two seasons, scoring six goals. He was released at the end of the 2019–20 season.

=== Barnet ===
McQueen signed for Barnet on 24 September 2020. He left the club after making 37 appearances in his only season with the Bees.

=== Indy Eleven ===
On 10 December 2021, it was announced that McQueen would join USL Championship side Indy Eleven ahead of their 2022 season. McQueen made his debut for Indy on 12 March 2022, in a 1–0 loss to Loudoun United FC. He left Indy Eleven following their 2022 season.

=== Oxford City ===
McQueen joined Oxford City in November 2023.

== International career ==
McQueen made his international debut for the Grenada national team in a friendly 2–2 tie with Trinidad and Tobago national football team on 12 November 2017. McQueen scored his first goal for the Spice Boys on 4 June 2022, during a 3–1 CONCACAF Nations League loss to El Salvador.

== Style of play ==
McQueen plays as a full-back or central midfielder. He is noted for his ability to use both feet.

== Career statistics ==
=== Club ===
As of match played 1 January 2024

Appearances and goals by club, season and competition
| Club | Season | League | | | National cup | | League cup | | Other | | Total | |
| Club | Season | Division | Apps | Goals | Apps | Goals | Apps | Goals | Apps | Goals | Apps | Goals |
|---|---|---|---|---|---|---|---|---|---|---|---|---|
| Tottenham Hotspur | 2013–14 | Premier League | 0 | 0 | 0 | 0 | 0 | 0 | 0 | 0 | 0 | 0 |
| Tottenham Hotspur | 2014–15 | Premier League | 0 | 0 | 0 | 0 | 0 | 0 | 0 | 0 | 0 | 0 |
| Tottenham Hotspur | Total | | 0 | 0 | 0 | 0 | 0 | 0 | 0 | 0 | 0 | 0 |
| Carlisle United | 2015–16 | League Two | 21 | 0 | 1 | 0 | 3 | 0 | 1 (Note: Appearances in EFL Trophy) | 0 | 26 | 0 |
| Carlisle United | 2016–17 | League Two | 4 | 0 | 0 | 0 | 0 | 0 | 1 | 0 | 5 | 0 |
| Carlisle United | Total | | 25 | 0 | 1 | 0 | 3 | 0 | 2 | 0 | 31 | 0 |
| PS Kemi | 2018 | Veikkausliiga | 0 | 0 | — | | — | | — | | 0 | 0 |
| VPS | 2018 | Veikkausliiga | 10 | 0 | — | | — | | — | | 10 | 0 |
| Dagenham & Redbridge | 2018–19 | National League | 35 | 5 | 1 | 0 | — | | 2 (Note: Appearances in FA Trophy) | 0 | 38 | 5 |
| Dagenham & Redbridge | 2019–20 | National League | 23 | 1 | 1 | 0 | — | | 2 | 0 | 26 | 1 |
| Dagenham & Redbridge | Total | | 58 | 6 | 2 | 0 | — | | 4 | 0 | 64 | 6 |
| Barnet | 2020–21 | National League | 34 | 1 | 2 | 0 | — | | 1 | 0 | 37 | 1 |
| Indy Eleven | 2022 | USL Championship | 21 | 0 | 1 | 0 | — | | 0 | 0 | 22 | 0 |
| Oxford City | 2023–24 | National League | 5 | 1 | 0 | 0 | — | | 0 | 0 | 5 | 1 |
| Career total | | | 153 | 8 | 6 | 0 | 3 | 0 | 7 | 0 | 169 | 8 |

=== International ===
As of match played 10 June 2022

Appearances and goals by national team and year
| National team | Year | Apps | Goals |
|---|---|---|---|
| Grenada | 2017 | 1 | 0 |
| Grenada | 2018 | 1 | 0 |
| Grenada | 2019 | 4 | 0 |
| Grenada | 2021 | 5 | 0 |
| Grenada | 2022 | 5 | 1 |
| Total | | 16 | 1 |

Scores and results list Grenada's goal tally first, score column indicates score after each McQueen goal.

List of international goals scored by Alexander McQueen
| No. | Date | Venue | Opponent | Score | Result | Competition | Ref. |
|---|---|---|---|---|---|---|---|
| 1 | 4 June 2022 | Estadio Cuscatlán, San Salvador, El Salvador | El Salvador | 1–1 | 1–3 | 2022–23 CONCACAF Nations League | |
