= Steven Rigg =

English footballer (born 1992)

Personal information
- Full name: Steven James Rigg
- Date of birth: 30 June 1992 (age 34)
- Place of birth: Keswick, England
- Height: 6 ft 1 in (1.85 m)
- Position: Striker

Team information
- Current team: Workington

Youth career
- 2000–2009: Keswick

Senior career*
Years	Team	Apps	(Gls)
2009–2012	Keswick		
2012–2014	Penrith	85	(64)
2014–2016	Carlisle United	36	(6)
2015	→ Barrow (loan)	1	(0)
2016–2017	Queen of the South	10	(0)
2017–2018	Carlisle United	3	(0)
2018	Chorley	1	(0)
2018	→ Workington (loan)	12	(4)
2018	Erie Commodores FC	?	(?)
2018–2019	Gateshead	44	(9)
2019–2021	Dover Athletic	42	(2)
2021–	Workington	130	(38)
- * Club domestic league appearances and goals as of 20:40, 28 April 2025 (UTC)

Steven James Rigg (born 30 June 1992) is an English footballer who last played as a striker for Workington. Rigg has previously played for Keswick, Penrith, Barrow, Queen of the South and Carlisle United in two spells with the club.

== Career ==
Rigg began his senior career with Northern League club Penrith. Rigg had previously represented Keswick at youth level. Whilst at Penrith, Rigg was employed as a forester at the National Trust.

In July 2014, Rigg signed for League Two club Carlisle United on a one-year professional contract. Rigg signed after a two-week trial period. He debuted in the Football League on 4 October 2014 and also scored in a 3–0 win over Hartlepool United. On 13 November 2014, Rigg signed a new one-year deal keeping him at the club until the summer of 2016.

On 26 November 2015, Rigg signed for National League Premier club Barrow until January 2016. Rigg was stretchered off on his debut for Barrow, after coming on as a substitute. Rigg suffered ligament damage which was detected after his injured ankle was x-rayed at Kendal Hospital and his loan spell was subsequently cut short.

Rigg was released by Carlisle and signed for Dumfries club Queen of the South of the Scottish Championship when his contract expired at the end of June 2016. Rigg's contract at Queens wasn't renewed during May 2017, so he released after one season.

On 12 October 2017, Rigg rejoined the Cumbrians on a short-term contract after being given training facilities with the Brunton Park club to regain his fitness after suffering from a long-term injury whilst playing for the Doonhamers.

In June 2019 he moved from Gateshead to Dover Athletic. Following's Dover's decision to not play any more matches in the 2020–21 season, made in late January, and subsequent null and voiding of all results, on 5 May 2021 it was announced that Rigg was out of contract and had left the club. On 4 July 2021, he signed for Northern Premier League Division One West side Workington, rejoining the club where he had a loan spell in 2014.

== Career statistics ==
As of match played 26 April 2025

Appearances and goals by club, season and competition
Club	Season	League			National Cup		League Cup		Other		Total	
Club	Season	Division	Apps	Goals	Apps	Goals	Apps	Goals	Apps	Goals	Apps	Goals
Carlisle United	2014–15	League Two	28	6	0	0	0	0	1 (Note: Appearances in the Football League Trophy)	0	29	6
Carlisle United	2015–16	League Two	8	0	0	0	1	0	1	0	10	0
Carlisle United	Carlisle total		36	6	0	0	1	0	2	0	39	6
Barrow (loan)	2015–16	National League	1	0	0	0	—		0	0	1	0
Queen of the South	2016–17	Scottish Championship	10	0	0	0	4	0	2 (Note: Appearances in the Scottish Challenge Cup)	2	16	2
Carlisle United	2017–18	League Two	3	0	0	0	0	0	1 (Note: Appearance in the EFL Trophy)	0	4	0
Chorley	2017–18	National League North	1	0	—		—		0	0	1	0
Workington (loan)	2017–18	Northern Premier Division	12	4	—		—		0	0	12	4
Gateshead	2018–19	National League	44	9	2	1	—		1 (Note: Appearance(s) in FA Trophy)	0	47	10
Dover Athletic	2019–20	National League	30	1	2	0	—		1	0	33	1
Dover Athletic	2020–21	National League	12	1	1	0	—		0	0	13	1
Dover Athletic	Total		42	2	3	0	—		1	0	46	2
Workington	2021–22	NPL Division One West	26	6	0	0	—		1	0	27	6
Workington	2022–23	NPL Division One West	32	5	2	1	—		5	2	39	8
Workington	2023–24	NPL Premier Division	35	10	1	1	—		3	1	39	12
Workington	2024–25	NPL Premier Division	37	17	1	0	—		3	4	41	21
Workington	Total		130	38	4	2	—		12	7	146	47
Career total			279	59	9	3	5	0	19	9	312	71
