= Alex Gilliead =

English association football player

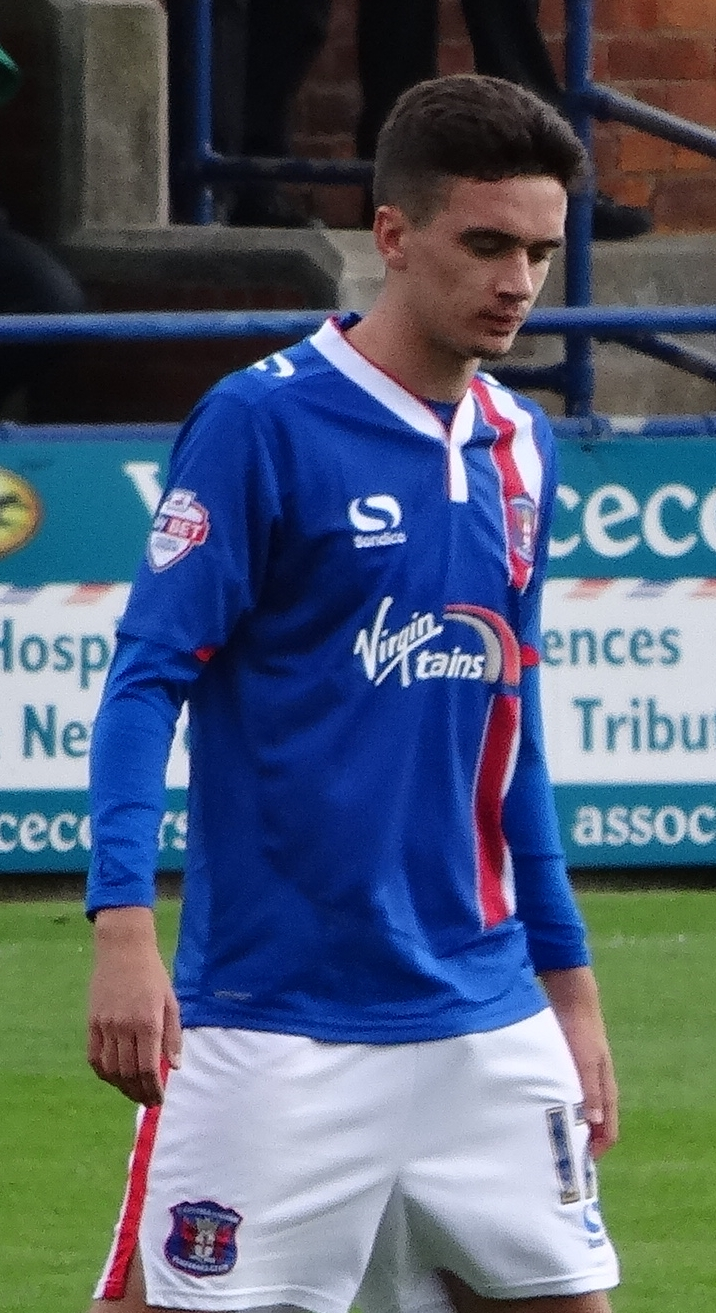
- Gilliead playing for Carlisle United in 2015

Personal information
- Full name: Alex Nicholas Gilliead
- Date of birth: 11 February 1996 (age 30)
- Place of birth: Shotley Bridge, England
- Height: 6 ft 0 in (1.83 m)
- Position: Midfielder

Youth career
- 2012–2014: Newcastle United

Senior career*
Years	Team	Apps	(Gls)
2014–2018	Newcastle United	0	(0)
2015–2016	→ Carlisle United (loan)	35	(5)
2016–2017	→ Luton Town (loan)	18	(1)
2017	→ Bradford City (loan)	9	(0)
2017–2018	→ Bradford City (loan)	42	(1)
2018–2019	Shrewsbury Town	27	(1)
2019–2021	Scunthorpe United	79	(7)
2021–2024	Bradford City	123	(5)
2024–2026	Shrewsbury Town	45	(0)
2025–2026	→ Carlisle United (loan)	37	(0)

International career
2011–2012	England U16	4	(0)
2012–2013	England U17	8	(0)
2014	England U18	2	(0)
2015–2016	England U20	7	(1)
- * Club domestic league appearances and goals as of 23:43, 7 June 2026 (UTC)

Alex Nicholas Gilliead (born 11 February 1996) is an English professional footballer who plays as a midfielder or winger most recently for Shrewsbury Town. He has represented England at under-16, under-17, under-18, and under-20 levels.

== Club career ==
=== Newcastle United ===
Born in Shotley Bridge, County Durham, Gilliead was offered a trial by Newcastle United in 2011, after he was first noticed playing for Swalwell Juniors. He signed scholarship terms in the summer of 2012, before signing a three-year professional contract with the club on 4 July 2013. Gilliead signed a new two-and-a-half-year contract on 28 January 2016 to keep him at the club until 30 June 2018, with the option of a further year.

==== Loan to Carlisle United ====
On 14 September 2015, Gilliead joined League Two club Carlisle United on a one-month youth loan. He made his professional debut five days later in a 2–2 draw with York City, assisting both of Carlisle's goals. Gilliead's loan was extended until the end of 2015–16, having made five appearances during his initial loan spell. He followed up his loan extension by scoring his first professional goal two days later in a 1–0 win at home to Exeter City. Gilliead completed the loan spell with 41 appearances and five goals.

==== Loan to Luton Town ====
On 31 August 2016, Gilliead joined League Two club Luton Town on loan until 7 January 2017. He debuted as an 85th-minute substitute in a 2–1 defeat at home to Grimsby Town on 10 September. Gilliead scored his first goal for Luton in a 2–0 win at home to West Bromwich Albion U21 in the EFL Trophy on 4 October. He later scored his first league goal for the club in a 3–1 win at home to Barnet on 31 December. Gilliead scored two goals in 21 appearances and returned to Newcastle following the expiration of his loan spell.

==== Loan to Bradford City ====
On 12 January 2017, Gilliead signed for League One club Bradford City on loan until the end of 2016–17. He made his debut two days later as a 76th-minute substitute in a 1–0 defeat away to Shrewsbury Town and completed the loan spell with 10 appearances.

Gilliead returned to Bradford City on a six-month loan on 7 July 2017. On 4 January 2018, Gilliead's loan at Bradford was extended until the end of the season. He scored two goals from 48 appearances, as Bradford finished in 11th place in the table.

=== Shrewsbury Town ===
Gilliead signed for League One club Shrewsbury Town on 10 July 2018 on a two-year contract, following his release by Newcastle.

=== Scunthorpe United ===
Gilliead signed for Scunthorpe United, who were newly relegated to League Two, on 9 July 2019 on a two-year contract for an undisclosed fee. He was one of 17 players released by Scunthorpe at the end of the 2020–21 season.

=== Return to Bradford City ===
Gilliead rejoined Bradford City, this time on a permanent basis, in the summer of 2021. His first Bradford goal since 2018 came in a 2-0 home win over Rochdale on 2 October 2021.

Gilliead signed a 2-year contract extension with Bradford in June 2023.

=== Return to Shrewsbury Town ===
On 30 August 2024, Gilliead returned to League One club Shrewsbury Town on a two-year deal.

On 1 September 2025, Gilliead returned to another of his former clubs, joining Carlisle United on loan until 11 January 2026, ten years on from an initial loan spell with the now National League club.

== International career ==
Gilliead has represented England at under-16, under-17, under-18, and under-20 levels.

== Career statistics ==
As of end of 2025–26 season

Appearances and goals by club, season and competition
Club	Season	League			FA Cup		League Cup		Other		Total	
Club	Season	Division	Apps	Goals	Apps	Goals	Apps	Goals	Apps	Goals	Apps	Goals
Newcastle United	2014–15	Premier League	0	0	0	0	0	0	—		0	0
Newcastle United	2015–16	Premier League	0	0	—		0	0	—		0	0
Newcastle United	2016–17	Championship	0	0	—		0	0	—		0	0
Newcastle United	Total		0	0	0	0	0	0	—		0	0
Carlisle United (loan)	2015–16	League Two	35	5	5	0	1	0	—		41	5
Luton Town (loan)	2016–17	League Two	18	1	2	0	—		1 (Note: Appearance(s) in EFL Trophy)	1	21	2
Bradford City (loan)	2016–17	League One	9	0	—		—		1 (Note: Appearance in League One play-offs)	0	10	0
Bradford City (loan)	2017–18	League One	42	1	3	1	1	0	2	0	48	2
Bradford City (loan)	Total		51	1	3	1	1	0	3	0	58	2
Shrewsbury Town	2018–19	League One	27	1	4	0	1	0	3	2	35	3
Scunthorpe United	2019–20	League Two	35	6	1	0	1	0	5	0	42	6
Scunthorpe United	2020–21	League Two	44	1	1	0	1	0	1	0	47	1
Scunthorpe United	Total		79	7	2	0	2	0	6	0	89	7
Bradford City	2021–22	League Two	43	1	2	0	1	0	3	0	49	1
Bradford City	2022–23	League Two	42	1	1	0	2	0	5 (Note: Three appearances in EFL Trophy, two in League Two play-offs)	0	50	1
Bradford City	2023–24	League Two	38	3	1	0	2	0	7	0	48	3
Bradford City	Total		123	5	4	0	5	0	15	0	147	5
Shrewsbury Town	2024–25	League One	42	0	1	0	0	0	2	0	45	0
Shrewsbury Town	2025–26	League Two	3	0	—		1	0	0	0	4	0
Shrewsbury Town	Total		45	0	1	0	1	0	2	0	49	0
Carlisle United (loan)	2025–26	National League	37	0	3	0	—		1 (Note: Appearance in FA Trophy)	0	41	0
Career total			415	20	24	1	11	0	31	3	481	24
