= Rhoys Wiggins =

Welsh footballer (born 1987)

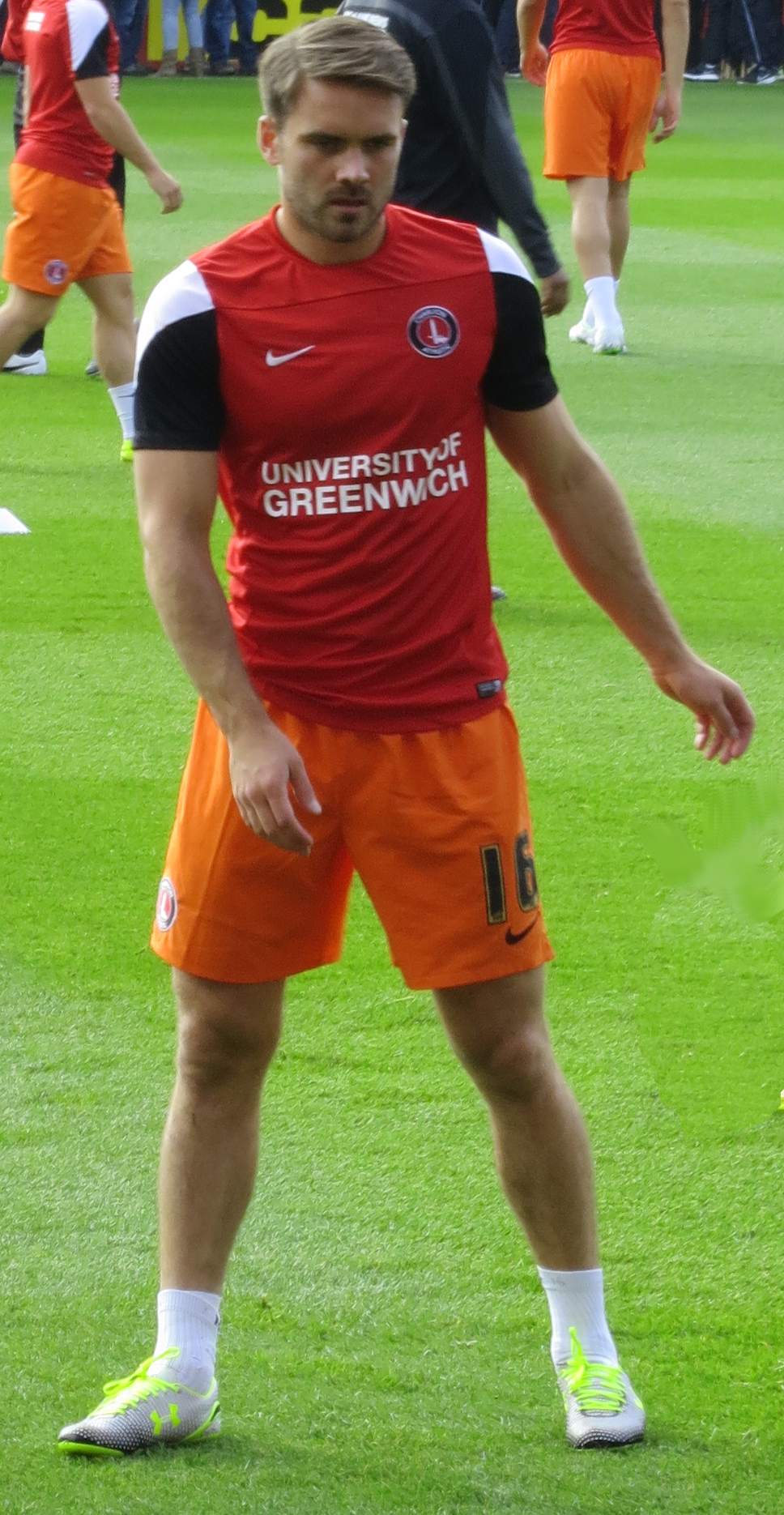
- Training with Charlton Athletic in 2014

Personal information
- Full name: Rhoys Barrie Wiggins
- Date of birth: 4 November 1987 (age 38)
- Place of birth: Uxbridge, England
- Height: 5 ft 8 in (1.73 m)
- Position: Left back

Youth career
- Crystal Palace

Senior career*
Years	Team	Apps	(Gls)
2006–2009	Crystal Palace	1	(0)
2008–2009	→ AFC Bournemouth (loan)	13	(0)
2009–2010	Norwich City	0	(0)
2010	→ AFC Bournemouth (loan)	19	(0)
2010–2011	AFC Bournemouth	35	(2)
2011–2015	Charlton Athletic	124	(1)
2015–2016	Sheffield Wednesday	6	(0)
2016–2018	AFC Bournemouth	0	(0)
2016–2017	→ Birmingham City (loan)	2	(0)
Total		200	(3)

International career
2004	Wales U17	1	(0)
2005–2006	Wales U19	6	(0)
2006–2008	Wales U21	10	(1)
- * Club domestic league appearances and goals

Rhoys Barrie Wiggins (born 4 November 1987) is a former professional footballer who played as a left back.

Wiggins began his career at Crystal Palace, from where he had his first spell on loan to AFC Bournemouth. After just one first-team appearance for Palace, he signed for Norwich City, but soon found himself again on loan at Bournemouth, for whom he signed a permanent contract in 2010. A season later, he joined Charlton Athletic, where he spent four years of regular first-team football. After a brief spell with Sheffield Wednesday, he returned to Bournemouth, by then in the Premier League, in January 2016, but did not play. He signed on loan at Birmingham City the following August, but was seriously injured in his second match and retired from football in May 2018.

Born in England, Wiggins has represented Wales in international football from under-17 to under-21 level.

== Club career ==
=== Crystal Palace ===
Wiggins was born in Uxbridge, England. He came through the academy at Crystal Palace, played regularly for their reserve team, and was shortlisted for the 2006 Football League Championship Apprentice of the Year, but lost out to Derby County's Lewin Nyatanga. In the summer of 2006, he signed his first professional contract with the club, but his progress was disrupted when he ruptured knee ligaments in a pre-season friendly against Palace's feeder academy, Crystal Palace Baltimore. He needed reconstructive surgery, and was sidelined for the rest of that season.

Although manager Neil Warnock thought Wiggins' impressive performances for Wales U21 against England in the European Championship qualification play-off round were not reflected on Palace's training ground, he gave him a first-team start soon afterwards, at home to Nottingham Forest in the Championship. His debut was marred by involvement in Forest's winning goal, but Warnock still "thought he did alright last night, first half I thought he was the only one that tackled. He's got a lot of attributes and he has got to use his strength and become a defender first and foremost." However, that one appearance was not added to, and Wiggins was made available for loan to get more playing time.

On 8 January 2009, Wiggins joined EFL League Two club AFC Bournemouth on a month's loan. He made his debut on 17 January, playing the whole of a 1–0 defeat against Rotherham United. He impressed at left back, and his loan was extended to the end of the season. Against Accrington Stanley on 14 February, he gave away what he felt was an unjust late penalty, but the kick was missed and Bournemouth won the match 1–0. During that match, Wiggins suffered knee damage that kept him out for six weeks, but he regained the left-back position and retained it for the rest of the campaign as Bournemouth secured their Football League status with one match to play. He made 13 appearances for the side.

=== Norwich City ===
Wiggins had further surgery on his knee, and was offered a new contract at Palace, but chose to move on in search of regular football. He had considered signing permanently for Bournemouth, but became one of several signings made by Bryan Gunn for Norwich City, newly relegated to League One. By the time Wiggins completed his rehabilitation and made his first outing for Norwich's reserves, Paul Lambert had replaced Gunn as manager. Wiggins made his first-team debut on 6 October, playing the whole of the Football League Trophy win over Gillingham. His next appearance, a month later, was as a substitute for established left-back Adam Drury in an FA Cup tie against Paulton Rovers; he kept his place for the next match, in the Football League Trophy, but when the league programme resumed, Drury was fit and Wiggins returned to the reserves.

=== AFC Bournemouth ===
Wiggins returned to AFC Bournemouth on 29 January 2010 on a 28-day emergency loan, permitted under the club's transfer embargo because so many players were injured or suspended. He started the next day's 2–1 win over Crewe Alexandra, He played regularly at left back even after Warren Cummings' suspension ended, and his loan was extended initially for a second month and then to 1 May. He started all 19 of Bournemouth's matches during his loan spell, and played the whole of all but the last, a 4–0 win against Port Vale that confirmed his team as 2009–10 League Two runners-up, when he was taken off after 87 minutes. His parent club, Norwich City, were promoted to the Championship at around the same time, and Wiggins suggested he had taken more satisfaction from Bournemouth's success because he had been part of the process.

Ahead of the 2010–11 season, Wiggins signed a two-year permanent contract with Bournemouth with the option of a third. He went straight into the starting eleven, and was a regular throughout the first half of the season. He scored the first goal of his senior career – "flying down the left [he] took a touch to compose himself before sending a sweet shot across [the goalkeeper] from just inside the penalty area" – as well as assisting the first two goals in a 3–0 home win against Dagenham and Redbridge on 11 September. A week later, he scored again, albeit in a losing cause, away at Oldham Athletic when his "free-kick from the touchline sailed over everyone and into the back of the net", and two weeks later, conceded a penalty that contributed to a defeat away to Southampton. In the second half of the season, he missed matches due to minor injuries, including being bitten by a dog during training, but still finished with 40 appearances in all competitions. He played in both legs of the League One play–offs as Bournemouth lost on penalties to Huddersfield Town after the semifinal finished 4–4 on aggregate.

In March 2011, after Bournemouth twice turned down bids from Championship club Watford for his services, Wiggins submitted a written transfer request. He claimed to have been "told early on that if ever a club from a higher league came in, Bournemouth wouldn't stand in [his] way", and that other players would not be leaving the club who then did so. The chairman said that Bournemouth were not a selling club, and that Watford's offers did not meet their valuation of the player. Manager Lee Bradbury praised Wiggins' attitude to his work after the request was turned down, but once the season ended, Wiggins' agent claimed that he would be allowed to leave for the right price.

=== Charlton Athletic ===
Despite Watford's continuing interest, it was League One club Charlton Athletic who agreed an undisclosed fee with Bournemouth. Wiggins signed a three-year contract on 30 June 2011, and made his debut in the starting eleven for a 3–0 opening-day win against his former club Bournemouth. He established himself in the left-back position ahead of fellow newcomer Cedric Evina. On 17 September, Wiggins scored his first goal for the club in the away win against Rochdale. He was nominated for League One Player of the Month award for October but lost out to Huddersfield Town's Jordan Rhodes. Wiggins set up two goals for Bradley Wright-Phillips in a 4–0 win over Hartlepool United on 29 October and one for Danny Hollands in a win over Preston North End a week later. He then helped the team's defence keep five clean sheets during January 2012, and maintained his contribution to the team's defensive strength with a run of six clean sheets from mid-March to mid-April 2012, the last of which, a 1–0 win away to Carlisle United, confirmed Charlton's promotion to the Championship. They went on to finish as League One champions, and Wiggins was one of four Charlton players named in the PFA League One Team of the Year. He missed just one match – rested for the penultimate fixture of the season once the title was secured – so made 47 appearances in all competitions.

Wiggins began the 2012–13 season as first choice, but fractured metatarsals in his foot caused when he fell awkwardly in a match against Crystal Palace in mid-September kept him out until the reverse fixture against the same team four-and-a-half months later. He regained his left-back position for the rest of the season, set up Jonathan Obika's stoppage-time winner against Leeds United on 6 April, and finished the season with 20 appearances in all competitions.

He continued in possession of the left-back spot, helped his side keep four consecutive clean sheets in October and November, but was sent off late in a defeat to Middlesbrough in January 2014 for a "crunching" tackle on Dean Whitehead. A few days later, Wiggins signed a new four-and-a-half-year contract, to run until 2018. He continued in the side until 15 April, when he again fractured a metatarsal and missed the last five matches of Charlton's run-in. He made 40 appearances in all competitions.

Wiggins started every league match of the 2014–15 season before a foot injury forced his absence from the match against Fulham in October. He returned to the starting line-up against Sheffield Wednesday on 1 November and set up an equaliser for Igor Vetokele in a 1–1 draw, but his return was short-lived as he suffered a stress fracture in his foot during the next match. He returned to the starting line-up in mid-January and lasted a month before a muscular injury forced him out. This time, he failed to regain his starting place when he returned to fitness: Morgan Fox, who had regularly covered for him, retained the position, and Wiggins made just one more appearance, in mid-April.

=== Sheffield Wednesday ===
On 5 August 2015, Wiggins completed a transfer to Sheffield Wednesday for an undisclosed fee, signing a three-year contract. He made his debut in Wednesday's 4–1 League Cup win over Mansfield Town at Hillsborough six days later, but found his first-team opportunities limited, with Daniel Pudil preferred at left back, and he asked to leave the club in January. By the time of his departure, Wiggins had made just nine appearances for the club.

=== Return to AFC Bournemouth ===
Eddie Howe signed Wiggins for AFC Bournemouth for a fourth time on 30 January 2016, for a fee understood by the media to be £200,000; he agreed a two-and-a-half-year deal. He said he hoped to redeem himself in the eyes of those supporters who had been left with "a sour taste in [their] mouths" when he left for Charlton Athletic five years before. Having joined the club to provide cover for Charlie Daniels, Wiggins himself was plagued by fitness concerns throughout the 2015–16 season. He was an unused substitute four times but never took the field as his team retained their Premier League status.

Wiggins signed for Championship club Birmingham City on 31 August 2016 on loan until the following January. He was carrying a hamstring injury when he arrived, and did not make his debut until 1 October, as a second-half substitute in a 1–0 win against Blackburn Rovers. With regular left-back Jonathan Grounds suspended, Wiggins made his second appearance, and first start, in the Second City derby against Aston Villa on 30 October. After what manager Gary Rowett dubbed an "absolutely brilliant" performance, he was stretchered off in stoppage time with what appeared to be a serious knee injury. Despite several operations, the injury forced his retirement from football some 18 months later.

== International career ==
Wiggins is eligible to play for either England (the country he was born) and Wales (through his father). He previously represented Wales U17 and Wales U19 sides.

While at Crystal Palace, Wiggins regularly turned out for the Wales under-21 team. On 9 September 2008, he scored his first Wales U21 goal, in a 3–0 win over Romania U21. Wiggins went on to make ten appearances and scoring once for the U21 side.

His appearances led to a call-up to the senior squad for a friendly against Trinidad and Tobago in May 2006, however he remained on the bench. In October 2013, seven years on from his last call up, he was called up for the FIFA World Cup 2014 qualifying matches against Belgium and Macedonia.

== Career statistics ==
Appearances and goals by club, season and competition
Club	Season	League			FA Cup		League Cup		Other		Total	
Club	Season	Division	Apps	Goals	Apps	Goals	Apps	Goals	Apps	Goals	Apps	Goals
Crystal Palace	2008–09	Championship	1	0	0	0	0	0	—		1	0
AFC Bournemouth (loan)	2008–09	League Two	13	0	—		—		—		13	0
Norwich City	2009–10	League One	0	0	1	0	0	0	2 (Note: Appearances in Football League Trophy)	0	3	0
AFC Bournemouth (loan)	2009–10	League Two	19	0	—		—		—		19	0
AFC Bournemouth	2010–11	League One	35	2	2	0	1	0	2 (Note: Appearances in Football League play-offs)	0	40	2
AFC Bournemouth	Total		54	2	2	0	1	0	2	0	59	2
Charlton Athletic	2011–12	League One	45	1	2	0	0	0	0	0	47	1
Charlton Athletic	2012–13	Championship	20	0	0	0	0	0	—		20	0
Charlton Athletic	2013–14	Championship	38	0	2	0	0	0	—		40	0
Charlton Athletic	2014–15	Championship	21	0	0	0	0	0	—		21	0
Charlton Athletic	Total		124	1	4	0	0	0	0	0	128	1
Sheffield Wednesday	2015–16	Championship	6	0	0	0	3	0	—		9	0
AFC Bournemouth	2015–16	Premier League	0	0	0	0	—		—		0	0
AFC Bournemouth	2016–17	Premier League	0	0	0	0	0	0	—		0	0
AFC Bournemouth	Total		0	0	0	0	0	0	—		0	0
Birmingham City (loan)	2016–17	Championship	2	0	—		—		—		2	0
Career total			200	3	7	0	4	0	4	0	215	3

== Honours ==
Charlton Athletic

- Football League One: 2011–12

Individual

- PFA Team of the Year: 2011–12 League One
