= 2011–12 Charlton Athletic F.C. season =

Charlton Athletic F.C.
2011–12 season
- Chairman: Michael Slater
- Manager: Chris Powell
- League One: 1st (promoted)
- FA Cup: Third round
- League Cup: Second round
- Football League Trophy: Second round (South)
- Top goalscorer: League: Bradley Wright-Phillips (22); All: Bradley Wright-Phillips (22)
- Highest home attendance: 26,749 (vs. Hartlepool United, 5 May 2012)
- Lowest home attendance: 13,264 (vs. Bury, 31 January 2012)
- Average home league attendance: 17,402
| Home colours | Away colours | Third colours |

During the 2011–12 English football season, Charlton Athletic competed in the Football League One. Charlton Athletic sealed a promotion to the 2012–13 Football League Championship on 14 April 2012, and clinched the Football League One title on 21 April 2012. Along with competing in League One, the club also participated in the FA Cup, League Cup, and the Football League Trophy. The season covered the period from 1 July 2011 to 30 June 2012.

== Kit ==
Macron were Kit suppliers, with Kent Reliance Building Society being the front of shirt sponsor.

== League table ==
| Pos | Team | Pld | W | D | L | GF | GA | GD | Pts | Promotion, qualification or relegation |
|---|---|---|---|---|---|---|---|---|---|---|
| 1 | Charlton Athletic (C, P) | 46 | 30 | 11 | 5 | 82 | 36 | +46 | 101 | Promotion to Football League Championship |
| 2 | Sheffield Wednesday (P) | 46 | 28 | 9 | 9 | 81 | 48 | +33 | 93 | Promotion to Football League Championship |
| 3 | Sheffield United | 46 | 27 | 9 | 10 | 92 | 51 | +41 | 90 | Qualification for League One play-offs (Note: Four teams play for one spot and promotion to Football League Championship.) |
| 4 | Huddersfield Town (O, P) | 46 | 21 | 18 | 7 | 79 | 47 | +32 | 81 | Qualification for League One play-offs |
| 5 | Milton Keynes Dons | 46 | 22 | 14 | 10 | 84 | 47 | +37 | 80 | Qualification for League One play-offs |

Updated to match(es) played on 5 May 2012. Source: BBC Sport
Rules for classification: 1) Points; 2) Goal difference; 3) Number of goals scored
(C) Champions; (O) Play-off winners; (P) Promoted

== Squad statistics ==
=== Appearances and goals ===
| No. | Pos | Nat | Player | Total | | League One | | FA Cup | | League Cup | | FL Trophy | |
| No. | Pos | Nat | Player | Apps | Goals | Apps | Goals | Apps | Goals | Apps | Goals | Apps | Goals |
|---|---|---|---|---|---|---|---|---|---|---|---|---|---|
| 1 | GK | (England) ENG | Ben Hamer | 42 | 0 | 41 | 0 | 0 | 0 | 1 | 0 | 0 | 0 |
| 2 | DF | (England) ENG | Andrew Hughes | 20 | 0 | 5+10 | 0 | 1+1 | 0 | 2 | 0 | 1 | 0 |
| 3 | DF | (Cameroon) CMR | Cedric Evina | 9 | 0 | 2+1 | 0 | 2+1 | 0 | 2 | 0 | 1 | 0 |
| 4 | MF | (England) ENG | Johnnie Jackson | 39 | 13 | 35+1 | 12 | 2+0 | 1 | 0 | 0 | 1 | 0 |
| 5 | DF | (England) ENG | Michael Morrison | 50 | 5 | 45 | 4 | 3 | 1 | 0+1 | 0 | 0+1 | 0 |
| 6 | DF | (England) ENG | Matt Taylor | 43 | 1 | 38+2 | 0 | 2 | 1 | 0 | 0 | 1 | 0 |
| 7 | MF | (England) ENG | Danny Green | 37 | 3 | 25+7 | 3 | 2 | 0 | 2 | 0 | 1 | 0 |
| 8 | MF | (England) ENG | Dale Stephens | 31 | 4 | 28+2 | 4 | 0 | 0 | 0 | 0 | 1 | 0 |
| 9 | FW | (England) ENG | Paul Hayes | 22 | 3 | 12+7 | 3 | 2 | 0 | 0 | 0 | 1 | 0 |
| 10 | FW | (England) ENG | Bradley Wright-Phillips | 45 | 22 | 41+1 | 22 | 1+2 | 0 | 0 | 0 | 0 | 0 |
| 11 | MF | (England) ENG | Scott Wagstaff | 30 | 5 | 9+15 | 5 | 2+1 | 0 | 0+2 | 0 | 1 | 0 |
| 12 | DF | (Republic of Ireland) IRL | Gary Doherty | 6 | 0 | 0+3 | 0 | 0 | 0 | 2 | 0 | 1 | 0 |
| 13 | GK | (England) ENG | John Sullivan | 8 | 0 | 1+2 | 0 | 3 | 0 | 1 | 0 | 1 | 0 |
| 14 | FW | (England) ENG | Danny Haynes | 38 | 2 | 17+21 | 2 | 0 | 0 | 0 | 0 | 0 | 0 |
| 15 | DF | (England) ENG | Yado Mambo | 2 | 0 | 0 | 0 | 0 | 0 | 1+1 | 0 | 0 | 0 |
| 16 | DF | (Wales) WAL | Rhoys Wiggins (Note: Wiggins was born in Hillingdon, England, but also qualified to represent Wales internationally and represented them at U-17, U-19, and U-21 level.) | 47 | 1 | 45 | 1 | 2 | 0 | 0 | 0 | 0 | 0 |
| 17 | FW | (Jamaica) JAM | Jason Euell (Note: Euell was born in Lambeth, England, and represented them at U-21 level, but also qualified to represent Jamaica internationally through his father and made his international debut for Jamaica in November 2004.) | 16 | 2 | 0+11 | 0 | 1+1 | 1 | 2 | 1 | 0+1 | 0 |
| 18 | MF | (Zimbabwe) ZIM | Bradley Pritchard | 25 | 1 | 10+10 | 0 | 2+1 | 1 | 2 | 0 | 0 | 0 |
| 20 | DF | (England) ENG | Chris Solly | 48 | 0 | 44 | 0 | 3 | 0 | 0+1 | 0 | 0 | 0 |
| 21 | MF | (Spain) ESP | Ruben Bover | 2 | 0 | 0 | 0 | 0 | 0 | 2 | 0 | 0 | 0 |
| 22 | MF | (England) ENG | Danny Hollands | 46 | 8 | 43 | 7 | 3 | 1 | 0 | 0 | 0 | 0 |
| 23 | MF | (Spain) ESP | Mikel Alonso | 1 | 0 | 0 | 0 | 0 | 0 | 0 | 0 | 1 | 0 |
| 26 | MF | (England) ENG | Tosan Popo | 1 | 0 | 0 | 0 | 0 | 0 | 0+1 | 0 | 0 | 0 |
| 28 | DF | (Guyana) GUY | Leon Cort (Note: Cort was born in Southwark, England, but also qualified to represent Guyana internationally and made his international debut for Guyana in 2010.) | 17 | 0 | 10+5 | 0 | 1 | 0 | 1 | 0 | 0 | 0 |
| 34 | FW | (England) ENG | Michael Smith | 1 | 0 | 0 | 0 | 0+1 | 0 | 0 | 0 | 0 | 0 |
| 36 | FW | (France) FRA | Yann Kermorgant | 39 | 12 | 33+3 | 12 | 1+1 | 0 | 0 | 0 | 0+1 | 0 |
| 40 | FW | (England) ENG | Leon Clarke | 7 | 0 | 1+6 | 0 | 0 | 0 | 0 | 0 | 0 | 0 |
Players registered to Charlton this season who are no longer at the club:
| 14 | FW | (England) ENG | Paul Benson | 3 | 1 | 0+1 | 0 | 0 | 0 | 2 | 1 | 0 | 0 |
| 19 | DF | (England) ENG | Simon Francis | 2 | 0 | 0 | 0 | 0 | 0 | 2 | 0 | 0 | 0 |
| 25 | MF | (England) ENG | Ben Davisson | 0 | 0 | 0 | 0 | 0 | 0 | 0 | 0 | 0 | 0 |
| 44 | GK | (Republic of Ireland) IRL | Rob Elliot | 4 | 0 | 4 | 0 | 0 | 0 | 0 | 0 | 0 | 0 |
Players who played for Charlton on loan and returned to their parent club:
| 25 | MF | (England) ENG | Lee Cook | 4 | 0 | 3+1 | 0 | 0 | 0 | 0 | 0 | 0 | 0 |
| 37 | MF | (England) ENG | Darel Russell | 11 | 2 | 8+3 | 2 | 0 | 0 | 0 | 0 | 0 | 0 |
| 39 | FW | (France) FRA | Dany N'Guessan | 7 | 4 | 6+1 | 4 | 0 | 0 | 0 | 0 | 0 | 0 |
| 39 | FW | (England) ENG | Hogan Ephraim | 5 | 1 | 4+1 | 1 | 0 | 0 | 0 | 0 | 0 | 0 |
Players who were registered to Charlton without making a senior appearance:
| 27 | MF | (England) ENG | Freddie Warren | 0 | 0 | 0 | 0 | 0 | 0 | 0 | 0 | 0 | 0 |
| 29 | GK | (England) ENG | Conor Gough | 0 | 0 | 0 | 0 | 0 | 0 | 0 | 0 | 0 | 0 |
| 30 | GK | (England) ENG | Nick Pope | 0 | 0 | 0 | 0 | 0 | 0 | 0 | 0 | 0 | 0 |
| 31 | MF | (England) ENG | Jordan Cousins | 0 | 0 | 0 | 0 | 0 | 0 | 0 | 0 | 0 | 0 |
| 32 | MF | (England) ENG | Callum Harriott (Note: Harriott was born in Croydon, England, and represented them at U-19 level, but also qualified to represent Guyana and Jamaica internationally and would make his international debut for Guyana in March 2019.) | 0 | 0 | 0 | 0 | 0 | 0 | 0 | 0 | 0 | 0 |
| 33 | MF | (England) ENG | Harry Osborne | 0 | 0 | 0 | 0 | 0 | 0 | 0 | 0 | 0 | 0 |
| 35 | FW | (England) ENG | Joe Pigott | 0 | 0 | 0 | 0 | 0 | 0 | 0 | 0 | 0 | 0 |
| 38 | FW | (England) ENG | Ade Azeez | 0 | 0 | 0 | 0 | 0 | 0 | 0 | 0 | 0 | 0 |

=== Top scorers ===
| Place | Position | Nation | Number | Name | League One | FA Cup | League Cup | FL Trophy | Total |
|---|---|---|---|---|---|---|---|---|---|
| 1 | FW | (England) | 10 | Bradley Wright-Phillips | 22 | 0 | 0 | 0 | 22 |
| 2 | MF | (England) | 4 | Johnnie Jackson | 12 | 1 | 0 | 0 | 13 |
| 3 | FW | (France) | 36 | Yann Kermorgant | 12 | 0 | 0 | 0 | 12 |
| 4 | MF | (England) | 22 | Danny Hollands | 7 | 1 | 0 | 0 | 8 |
| 5 | MF | (England) | 11 | Scott Wagstaff | 5 | 0 | 0 | 0 | 5 |
| = | DF | (England) | 5 | Michael Morrison | 4 | 1 | 0 | 0 | 5 |
| 7 | MF | (England) | 8 | Dale Stephens | 4 | 0 | 0 | 0 | 4 |
| = | MF | (France) | 8 | Dany N'Guessan | 4 | 0 | 0 | 0 | 4 |
| 9 | MF | (England) | 7 | Danny Green | 3 | 0 | 0 | 0 | 3 |
| = | MF | (England) | 9 | Paul Hayes | 3 | 0 | 0 | 0 | 3 |
| 11 | MF | (England) | 37 | Darel Russell | 2 | 0 | 0 | 0 | 2 |
| = | MF | (England) | 14 | Danny Haynes | 2 | 0 | 0 | 0 | 2 |
| = | FW | (Jamaica) | 17 | Jason Euell | 0 | 1 | 1 | 0 | 2 |
| 14 | FW | (England) | 14 | Paul Benson | 0 | 0 | 1 | 0 | 1 |
| = | MF | (England) | 39 | Hogan Ephraim | 1 | 0 | 0 | 0 | 1 |
| = | MF | (Zimbabwe) | 18 | Bradley Pritchard | 0 | 1 | 0 | 0 | 1 |
| = | DF | (England) | 6 | Matt Taylor | 0 | 1 | 0 | 0 | 1 |
| = | DF | (Wales) | 16 | Rhoys Wiggins | 1 | 0 | 0 | 0 | 1 |
| Totals | | | | | 82 | 6 | 2 | 0 | 90 |

=== Disciplinary record ===
| Number | Nation | Position | Name | League One | | FA Cup | | League Cup | | FL Trophy | | Total | |
| Number | Nation | Position | Name | Yellow card | Red card | Yellow card | Red card | Yellow card | Red card | Yellow card | Red card | Yellow card | Red card |
| 7 | (England) | MF | Danny Green | 7 | 0 | 1 | 0 | 0 | 0 | 1 | 0 | 9 | 0 |
| 16 | (Wales) | DF | Rhoys Wiggins | 7 | 0 | 0 | 0 | 0 | 0 | 0 | 0 | 7 | 0 |
| 5 | (England) | DF | Michael Morrison | 6 | 0 | 0 | 0 | 0 | 0 | 0 | 0 | 6 | 0 |
| 36 | (France) | FW | Yann Kermorgant | 6 | 0 | 0 | 0 | 0 | 0 | 0 | 0 | 6 | 0 |
| 22 | (England) | MF | Danny Hollands | 4 | 1 | 0 | 0 | 0 | 0 | 0 | 0 | 4 | 1 |
| 11 | (England) | MF | Scott Wagstaff | 4 | 1 | 0 | 0 | 0 | 0 | 0 | 0 | 4 | 1 |
| 37 | (England) | MF | Darel Russell | 3 | 2 | 0 | 0 | 0 | 0 | 0 | 0 | 3 | 2 |
| 1 | (England) | GK | Ben Hamer | 3 | 1 | 0 | 0 | 0 | 0 | 0 | 0 | 3 | 1 |
| 8 | (England) | MF | Dale Stephens | 3 | 0 | 0 | 0 | 0 | 0 | 0 | 0 | 3 | 0 |
| 20 | (England) | DF | Chris Solly | 3 | 0 | 0 | 0 | 0 | 0 | 0 | 0 | 3 | 0 |
| 6 | (England) | DF | Matt Taylor | 3 | 0 | 0 | 0 | 0 | 0 | 0 | 0 | 3 | 0 |
| 10 | (England) | FW | Bradley Wright-Phillips | 2 | 0 | 0 | 0 | 0 | 0 | 0 | 0 | 2 | 0 |
| 4 | (England) | MF | Johnnie Jackson | 2 | 0 | 0 | 0 | 0 | 0 | 0 | 0 | 2 | 0 |
| 18 | (Zimbabwe) | MF | Bradley Pritchard | 2 | 0 | 0 | 0 | 0 | 0 | 0 | 0 | 2 | 0 |
| 28 | (Guyana) | DF | Leon Cort | 2 | 0 | 0 | 0 | 0 | 0 | 0 | 0 | 2 | 0 |
| 44 | (England) | GK | Rob Elliot | 1 | 0 | 0 | 0 | 0 | 0 | 0 | 0 | 1 | 0 |
| 19 | (England) | DF | Simon Francis | 0 | 0 | 0 | 0 | 1 | 0 | 0 | 0 | 1 | 0 |
| 21 | (Spain) | MF | Ruben Bover | 0 | 0 | 0 | 0 | 1 | 0 | 0 | 0 | 1 | 0 |
| | | | TOTALS | 58 | 5 | 1 | 0 | 2 | 0 | 1 | 0 | 62 | 5 |

== Results ==
=== Club Standings ===
| Overall | | | | | | | | Home | | | | | | Away | | | | | |
| Pld | W | D | L | GF | GA | GD | Pts | W | D | L | GF | GA | GD | W | D | L | GF | GA | GD |
|---|---|---|---|---|---|---|---|---|---|---|---|---|---|---|---|---|---|---|---|
| 46 | 30 | 11 | 5 | 82 | 36 | +46 | 101 | 15 | 6 | 2 | 46 | 20 | +26 | 15 | 5 | 3 | 36 | 16 | +20 |

Last updated: 5 May 2012.

=== Round-by-Round Results ===
| Round | 1 | 2 | 3 | 4 | 5 | 6 | 7 | 8 | 9 | 10 | 11 | 12 | 13 | 14 | 15 | 16 | 17 | 18 | 19 | 20 | 21 | 22 | 23 | 24 | 25 | 26 | 27 | 28 | 29 | 30 | 31 | 32 | 33 | 34 | 35 | 36 | 37 | 38 | 39 | 40 | 41 | 42 | 43 | 44 | 45 | 46 |
|---|---|---|---|---|---|---|---|---|---|---|---|---|---|---|---|---|---|---|---|---|---|---|---|---|---|---|---|---|---|---|---|---|---|---|---|---|---|---|---|---|---|---|---|---|---|---|
| Ground | H | A | A | H | A | H | H | A | H | A | A | H | A | H | A | A | H | A | H | A | H | A | A | H | A | H | A | H | H | A | H | H | A | A | H | H | A | H | A | H | A | H | A | H | A | H |
| Result | W | W | W | D | W | D | W | W | W | D | W | D | L | W | W | W | W | W | W | D | D | W | L | W | W | W | W | D | W | D | D | W | W | W | L | L | D | W | L | W | W | W | W | W | D | W |
| Position | 1 | 1 | 1 | 2 | 2 | 3 | 2 | 1 | 1 | 1 | 1 | 1 | 1 | 1 | 1 | 1 | 1 | 1 | 1 | 1 | 1 | 1 | 1 | 1 | 1 | 1 | 1 | 1 | 1 | 1 | 1 | 1 | 1 | 1 | 1 | 1 | 1 | 1 | 1 | 1 | 1 | 1 | 1 | 1 | 1 | 1 |

Updated to match(es) played on 5 May 2012. Source:
A = Away; H = Home; W = Win; D = Draw; L = Loss

=== Pre-season friendlies ===
| 9 July 2011 | Welling United | 0–3 | Charlton Athletic | Park View Road |
| 15:00 | | | Williams 56'; Morrison 68'; Green 78' | Attendance: 2,313 |

| 12 July 2011 | Bristol City | 1–2 | Charlton Athletic | St Lepe Stadium, Spain |
| 20:30 | Stead 80' | | Wright-Phillips 65'; Jackson 90' |

| 15 July 2011 | Cardiff City | 1–0 | Charlton Athletic | Estadio Guadalquivir del Coria CF, Spain |
| 19:30 | Gestade 30' |

| 20 July 2011 | Aldershot Town | 1–1 | Charlton Athletic | Recreation Ground |
| 19:45 | Guttridge 66' | | Benson 46' | Attendance: 846 |

| 23 July 2011 | Woking | 0–0 | Charlton Athletic | Kingfield Stadium |
| 15:00 | | | | Attendance: 1,078 |

| 26 July 2011 | Charlton Athletic | 1–0 | Den Bosch | The Valley |
| 19:45 | Wright-Phillips 76' | | | Attendance: 3,951 |

| 27 July 2011 | Bromley | 0–4 | Charlton Athletic | Courage Stadium |
| 19:45 | | | Euell 28'; Popo 63'; Harriott 79'; Azeez 79' |

| 30 July 2011 | Millwall | 4–3 | Charlton Athletic | The Den |
| 15:00 | Henry 14'; Marquis 30', 34'; Bouazza 80' | Report | Wright-Phillips 5', 15'; Jackson 73' | Attendance: 6,202; Referee: Phil Crossley |

=== League One ===
| 6 August 2011 1 | Charlton Athletic | 3–0 | Bournemouth | The Valley |
| 15:00 | Stephens 23'; Wagstaff 51'; Jackson 77' (pen.) | | | Attendance: 16,111 |

| 13 August 2011 2 | Notts County | 1–2 | Charlton Athletic | Meadow Lane |
| 15:00 | Montano 60' | | Wagstaff 35'; Hayes 45+1' | Attendance: 6,397 |

| 16 August 2011 3 | Colchester United | 0–2 | Charlton Athletic | Colchester Community Stadium |
| 19:45 | | | Wright-Phillips 13', 28' | Attendance: 5,094 |

| 20 August 2011 4 | Charlton Athletic | 2–2 | Scunthorpe United | The Valley |
| 15:00 | Jackson 20'; Wright-Phillips 57' | | Grant 73', 90+1' | Attendance: 15,505 |

| 27 August 2011 5 | Bury | 1–2 | Charlton Athletic | Gigg Lane Stadium |
| 15:00 | Lowe 40' | | Hayes 49'; Jackson 64' | Attendance: 3,084 |

| 5 September 2011 6 | Charlton Athletic | 1–1 | Sheffield Wednesday | The Valley |
| 19:45 | Wright-Phillips 4' | | Morrison 56' | Attendance: 14,014 |

| 10 September 2011 7 | Charlton Athletic | 2–0 | Exeter City | The Valley |
| 15:00 | Wright-Phillips 43'; Stephens 81' | | | Attendance: 14,290 |

| 17 September 2011 8 | Rochdale | 2–3 | Charlton Athletic | Spotland Stadium |
| 15:00 | Grimes 57'; Ball 60' | | Hollands 20', 80'; Wiggins 44' | Attendance: 2,909 |

| 24 September 2011 9 | Charlton Athletic | 3–1 | Chesterfield | The Valley |
| 15:00 | Hayes 19'; Jackson 29'; Wright-Phillips 90+2' | | Whitaker 72' (pen.) | Attendance: 22,151 |

| 27 September 2011 10 | Milton Keynes Dons | 1–1 | Charlton Athletic | stadium:mk |
| 19:45 | Williams 21' (pen.) | | Kermorgant 75' | Attendance: 8,114 |

| 1 October 2011 11 | Sheffield United | 0–2 | Charlton Athletic | Bramall Lane |
| 15:00 | | | Kermorgant 65'; Wright-Phillips 67' | Attendance: 20,743 |

| 8 October 2011 12 | Charlton Athletic | 1–1 | Tranmere Rovers | The Valley |
| 15:00 | Jackson 80' | | McGurk 33' | Attendance: 15,038 |

| 15 October 2011 13 | Stevenage | 1–0 | Charlton Athletic | Broadhall Way |
| 15:00 | Long 11' | | | Attendance: 4,724 |

| 22 October 2011 14 | Charlton Athletic | 4–0 | Carlisle United | The Valley |
| 15:00 | Kermorgant 13', 37'; Wright-Phillips 21'; Hollands 48' | | | Attendance: 16,741 |

| 25 October 2011 15 | Wycombe Wanderers | 1–2 | Charlton Athletic | Adams Park |
| 19:45 | Beavon 63' | | Wright-Phillips 6', 41' | Attendance: 5,406 |

| 29 October 2011 16 | Hartlepool United | 0–4 | Charlton Athletic | Victoria Park |
| 15:00 | | | Wright-Phillips 9', 37'; Hollands 55'; Wagstaff 84' | Attendance: 5,333 |

| 5 November 2011 17 | Charlton Athletic | 5–2 | Preston North End | The Valley |
| 15:00 | Jackson 16', 26' (pen.); Morrison 22'; Wright-Phillips 38'; Hollands 69' | | Morgan 85'; Daley 90+1' | Attendance: 17,486 |

| 19 November 2011 18 | Brentford | 0–1 | Charlton Athletic | Griffin Park |
| 15:00 | | | Wright-Phillips 64' | Attendance: 8,095 |

| 28 November 2011 19 | Charlton Athletic | 2–0 | Huddersfield Town | The Valley |
| 19:45 | Kermorgant 23'; Ephraim 41' | | | Attendance: 18,029 |

| 10 December 2011 20 | Walsall | 1–1 | Charlton Athletic | Bescot Stadium |
| 15:00 | Macken 36'; Smith (yellow card) 45'; Sadler (yellow card) 90' (yellow-red card) | | Kermorgant 45'; Hollands (yellow card) 90' | Attendance: 4,537 |

| 17 December 2011 21 | Charlton Athletic | 1–1 | Oldham Athletic | The Valley |
| 15:00 | Russell 60' (yellow card) 68'; Hollands (yellow card) 82' | | Morais 84'; Adeyemi (yellow card) 7' | Attendance: 19,564 |

| 26 December 2011 22 | Yeovil Town | 2–3 | Charlton Athletic | Huish Park |
| 15:00 | Obika 8'; Huntington 50'; Wotton (yellow card) 45'; Upson (yellow card) 65'; Ayling (yellow card) 70' | | Hollands 16'; Kermorgant 60'; Green 90+1' (yellow card) 52'; Russell (yellow card) 67'; Wiggins (yellow card) 88' | Attendance: 4,977 |

| 31 December 2011 23 | Leyton Orient | 1–0 | Charlton Athletic | Brisbane Road |
| 17:20 | Spring 25' | | Hamer (red card) 6'; Morrison (yellow card) 61' | Attendance: 5,097 |

| 2 January 2012 24 | Charlton Athletic | 2–0 | Brentford | The Valley |
| 15:15 | Morrison 57'; Green 90'; Solly (yellow card) 51'; Wiggins (yellow card) 77'; Cort (yellow card) 88' | | | Attendance: 17,506 |

| 14 January 2012 25 | Sheffield Wednesday | 0–1 | Charlton Athletic | Hillsborough |
| 15:00 | Madine (yellow card) 29'; M. Jones (yellow card) 32'; Semedo (yellow card) 78'; Lowe (yellow card) 78'; R. Jones (yellow card) 81' | | Jackson 28'; Kermorgant (yellow card) 42' | Attendance: 26,759 |

| 21 January 2012 26 | Charlton Athletic | 1–0 | Sheffield United | The Valley |
| 15:00 | Jackson 21'; Wiggins (yellow card) 25'; Pritchard (yellow card) 60'; Hamer (yellow card) 62'; Russell (red card) 85'; Kermorgant (yellow card) 86' | | Doyle (yellow card) 80'; McDonald (yellow card) 81'; Evans (yellow card) 86'; Beattie (yellow card) 86' (yellow-red card); Williams (yellow card) 90+1' | Attendance: 20,992 |

| 28 January 2012 27 | Exeter City | 0–1 | Charlton Athletic | St. James' Park |
| 15:00 | | | Green 55'; Hollands (yellow card) 81'; Wiggins (yellow card) 90' | Attendance: 5,439 |

| 31 January 2012 28 | Charlton Athletic | 1–1 | Bury | The Valley |
| 15:00 | Stephens 90+3'; Green (yellow card) 44'; Taylor (yellow card) 90' | | John-Lewis 42' | Attendance: 13,264 |

| 14 February 2012 29 | Charlton Athletic | 2–1 | Milton Keynes Dons | The Valley |
| 19:45 | Jackson 43' (pen.), 45+3' (pen.); Stephens (yellow card) 52' | | Bowditch 87'; MacKenzie (yellow card) 42' (red card); Smith (yellow card) 45' | Attendance: 15,569 |

| 18 February 2012 30 | Tranmere Rovers | 1–1 | Charlton Athletic | Prenton Park |
| 15:00 | Brunt 33'; Williams (yellow card) 87' | | Morrison 60'; Kermorgant (yellow card) 79' | Attendance: 4,685 |

| 21 February 2012 31 | Charlton Athletic | 1–1 | Rochdale | The Valley |
| 19:45 | Kermorgant 57' | | Adams 53'; Long (yellow card) 56' | Attendance: 15,067 |

| 25 February 2012 32 | Charlton Athletic | 2–0 | Stevenage | The Valley |
| 15:00 | Morrison 49'; Wright-Phillips 64'; Green (yellow card) 80'; Hollands (yellow card) 90' | | Bostwick (yellow card) 38' | Attendance: 26,546 |

| 28 February 2012 33 | Chesterfield | 0–4 | Charlton Athletic | b2net stadium |
| 19:45 | | | Wright-Phillips 43', 56', 66'; Jackson 58' | Attendance: 6,405 |

| 3 March 2012 34 | Bournemouth | 0–1 | Charlton Athletic | Dean Court |
| 15:00 | Daniels (yellow card) 78' | | Kermorgant 90+1' | Attendance: 8,034 |

| 6 March 2012 35 | Charlton Athletic | 0–2 | Colchester United | The Valley |
| 19:45 | Morrison (yellow card) 87' | | Wordsworth 5' (yellow card) 71'; Gillespie 73'; Henderson (yellow card) 70' | Attendance: 13,650 |

| 10 March 2012 36 | Charlton Athletic | 2–4 | Notts County | The Valley |
| 15:00 | Wright-Phillips 51'; Wagstaff 55' | | Judge 16'; Forte 18', 35', 40' | Attendance: 17,033 |

| 17 March 2012 37 | Scunthorpe United | 1–1 | Charlton Athletic | Glanford Park |
| 15:00 | Parkin 21' (pen.); Russell (yellow card) 67' | | Wright-Phillips 6'; Reid (yellow card) 36'; Duffy (yellow card) 79'; Robertson (yellow card) 90' | Attendance: 4,544 |

| 20 March 2012 38 | Charlton Athletic | 3–0 | Yeovil Town | The Valley |
| 19:45 | N'Guessan 7'; Wright-Phillips 60'; Russell 90' | | D'Ath (yellow card) 82' | Attendance: 13,717 |

| 24 March 2012 39 | Huddersfield Town | 1–0 | Charlton Athletic | Galpharm Stadium |
| 19:45 | Rhodes 14' | | Russell (red card) 57' | Attendance: 15,735 |

| 31 March 2012 40 | Charlton Athletic | 2–0 | Leyton Orient | The Valley |
| 15:00 | Wagstaff 7'; N'Guessan 82' | | Youssef (yellow card) 45'; Smith (yellow card) 45'; Leacock (yellow card) 51'; Forbes (yellow card) 61'; Reed (yellow card) 87' | Attendance: 17,425 |

| 7 April 2012 41 | Oldham Athletic | 0–1 | Charlton Athletic | Boundary Park |
| 15:00 | Diallo (yellow card) 21'; Mvoto (yellow card) 42' (yellow-red card); Kuqi (yellow card) 46'; Simpson (yellow card) 88' | | Kermorgant 49'; Stephens (yellow card) 18'; Hollands (red card) 30'; Wagstaff (yellow card) 76' (yellow-red card); Hamer (yellow card) 90'; Morrison (yellow card) 90' | Attendance: 3,641 |

| 9 April 2012 42 | Charlton Athletic | 1–0 | Walsall | The Valley |
| 15:00 | N'Guessan 35'; Pritchard (yellow card) 22'; Solly (yellow card) 59' | | Ledesma (yellow card) 66' | Attendance: 15,253 |

| 14 April 2012 43 | Carlisle United | 0–1 | Charlton Athletic | Brunton Park |
| 15:00 | Michalík (yellow card) 90' | | Wright-Phillips 76' (yellow card) 76'; Cort (yellow card) 70' | Attendance: 6,625 |

| 21 April 2012 44 | Charlton Athletic | 2–1 | Wycombe Wanderers | The Valley |
| 15:00 | Kermorgant 14'; Stephens 74'; Wright-Phillips (yellow card) 64' | | Beavon 45'; Eastmond (yellow card) 36' | Attendance: 18,539 |

| 28 April 2012 45 | Preston North End | 2–2 | Charlton Athletic | Deepdale |
| 15:00 | Hunt 57' (yellow card) 58'; Alexander 90+1' (yellow card) 90+2' | | Haynes 11'; N'Guessan 35'; Green (yellow card) 64' | Attendance: 12,029 |

| 5 May 2012 46 | Charlton Athletic | 3–2 | Hartlepool United | The Valley |
| 15:00 | Hollands 70'; Haynes 78'; Kermorgant 81' | | Hartley 31'; Liddle 86' | Attendance: 26,749 |

=== FA Cup ===
| 13 November 2011 1 | Halifax Town | 0–4 | Charlton Athletic | Halifax |
| 12:30 | Garner (yellow card) 59'; Lowe (red card) 84' | Report | Taylor 40'; Jackson 80'; Hollands 83'; Pritchard 90' | Stadium: The Shay; Attendance: 4,621; Referee: Geoff Eltringham |

| 3 December 2011 2 | Charlton Athletic | 2–0 | Carlisle United | London |
| 15:00 | Morrison 64'; Euell 90+1' | Report | | Stadium: The Valley; Attendance: 7,461; Referee: Andy Madley |

| 7 January 2012 3 | Fulham | 4–0 | Charlton Athletic | London |
| 15:00 | Dempsey 8' 61' 81' (pen.); Duff 87' | Report | Green (yellow card) 34' | Stadium: Craven Cottage; Attendance: 20,317; Referee: Philip Dowd |

=== League Cup ===
Charlton's first round tie against Reading drawn for 9 August 2011 was postponed on police advice due to the riots happening in London.

| 23 August 2011 Round 1 | Charlton Athletic | 2–1 | Reading | The Valley |
| 19:45 | Benson 25'; Euell 64' | | Morrison 73' | Attendance: 6,668; Referee: D. Whitestone |

| 13 September 2011 Round 2 | Charlton Athletic | 0–2 | Preston North End | The Valley |
| 19:45 | | | Russell 11'; Mayor 67' | Attendance: 5,130; Referee: Graham |

=== Football League Trophy ===
Charlton were awarded a bye for Round 1 of this season's Football League Trophy.

| 5 October 2011 Round 2 | Charlton Athletic | 0–3 | Brentford | The Valley |
| 19:45 | | | Adams 2'; O'Connor 24' (pen.); Diagouraga 61' | Attendance: 3,486; Referee: James Linington |

== Transfers ==
Players transferred in
| Date | Pos. | Name | Previous club | Fee | Ref. |
|---|---|---|---|---|---|
| 24 May 2011 | GK | (England) Nick Pope | (England) Bury Town | Undisclosed | |
| 1 June 2011 | MF | (England) Danny Hollands | (England) AFC Bournemouth | Free transfer | |
| 1 June 2011 | MF | (Zimbabwe) Bradley Pritchard | (England) Hayes & Yeading United | Free transfer | |
| 21 June 2011 | DF | (Cameroon) Cedric Evina | (England) Oldham Athletic | Free transfer | |
| 21 June 2011 | FW | (England) Paul Hayes | (England) Preston North End | Free transfer | |
| 23 June 2011 | MF | (Spain) Mikel Alonso | (Spain) Tenerife | Free transfer | |
| 29 June 2011 | MF | (England) Danny Green | (England) Dagenham & Redbridge | £350,000 | |
| 29 June 2011 | MF | (England) Dale Stephens | (England) Oldham Athletic | £375,000 | |
| 1 July 2011 | DF | (England) Matt Taylor | (England) Exeter City | Free (Bosman) | |
| 1 July 2011 | GK | (England) John Sullivan | (England) Millwall | Free transfer | |
| 1 July 2011 | MF | (Spain) Ruben Bover | (England) Halesowen Town | Undisclosed fee | |
| 1 July 2011 | DF | (Wales) Rhoys Wiggins | (England) AFC Bournemouth | £250,000 | |
| 8 July 2011 | DF | (England) Michael Morrison | (England) Sheffield Wednesday | Undisclosed fee | |
| 1 August 2011 | GK | (England) Ben Hamer | (England) Reading | Undisclosed fee | |
| 1 August 2011 | DF | (England) Andrew Hughes | (England) Scunthorpe United | Free transfer | |
| 10 August 2011 | FW | (Jamaica) Jason Euell | (England) Blackpool | Free transfer | |
| 31 August 2011 | FW | (England) Michael Smith | (England) Darlington | Undisclosed fee | |
| 14 September 2011 | FW | (France) Yann Kermorgant | (England) Leicester City | Free | |
| 1 January 2012 | FW | (England) Leon Clarke | (England) Swindon Town | Player Exchange | |
| 12 January 2012 | DF | (Guyana) Leon Cort | (England) Burnley | Free | |
| 13 January 2012 | FW | (England) Danny Haynes | (England) Barnsley | Undisclosed Fee | |
Players transferred out
| Date | Pos. | Name | To | Fee | Ref. |
| 2 June 2011 | GK | (England) Ross Worner | (England) Aldershot Town | Free transfer | |
| 8 June 2011 | DF | (England) Carl Jenkinson | (England) Arsenal | Undisclosed fee | |
| 21 June 2011 | MF | (France) Therry Racon | (England) Millwall | Free transfer | |
| 1 July 2011 | DF | (Central African Republic) Kelly Youga | Unattached | Free transfer | |
| 6 July 2011 | MF | (England) Joe Anyinsah | (England) Bristol Rovers | Free transfer | |
| 7 July 2011 | DF | (Portugal) José Semedo | (England) Sheffield Wednesday | Free transfer | |
| 25 July 2011 | MF | (Republic of Ireland) Alan McCormack | (England) Swindon Town | Undisclosed fee | |
| 4 August 2011 | DF | (Spain) Miguel Angel Llera | (England) Blackpool | Free transfer | |
| 6 August 2011 | DF | (Scotland) Christian Dailly | (England) Portsmouth | Free transfer | |
| 12 August 2011 | MF | (Cyprus) Alex Stavrinou | (England) Ebbsfleet United | Free transfer | |
| 29 August 2011 | MF | (England) Kyel Reid | (England) Bradford City | Free transfer | |
| 30 August 2011 | GK | (Republic of Ireland) Rob Elliot | (England) Newcastle United | Undisclosed fee | |
| 1 January 2012 | FW | (England) Paul Benson | (England) Swindon Town | Part Exchange | |
| 4 January 2012 | DF | (England) Simon Francis | (England) Bournemouth | Free | |
| 14 January 2012 | MF | (England) Ben Davisson | (England) Maidstone United | Free | |
Players loaned in
| Date from | Pos. | Name | From | Date to | Ref. |
| 29 August 2011 | DF | (England) Leon Cort | (England) Burnley | 31 May 2012 | |
| 8 November 2011 | MF | (England) Hogan Ephraim | (England) Queens Park Rangers | 3 January 2012 | |
| 24 November 2011 | MF | (England) Darel Russell | (England) Preston North End | End of season | |
| 19 March 2012 | MF | (France) Dany N'Guessan | (England) Millwall | End of season | |
| 19 March 2012 | MF | (England) Lee Cook | (England) Queens Park Rangers | End of season | |
Players loaned out
| Date from | Pos. | Name | To | Date to | Ref. |
| 10 August 2011 | GK | (England) Nick Pope | (England) Harrow Borough | 15 October 2011 | |
| 4 August 2011 | GK | (England) Conor Gough | (England) Salisbury City | 10 January 2012 | |
| 15 September 2011 | DF | (England) Yado Mambo | (England) Ebbsfleet United | 15 October 2011 | |
| 26 September 2011 | MF | (England) Freddie Warren | (England) Kettering Town | 26 October 2011 | |
| 1 October 2011 | MF | (England) Ben Davisson | (England) Welling United | 31 October 2011 | |
| 7 November 2011 | DF | (England) Simon Francis | (England) Bournemouth | 4 January 2012 | |
| 10 January 2012 | MF | (Jamaica) Jason Euell | (England) AFC Wimbledon | 17 March 2012 | |
| 18 January 2012 | FW | (England) Michael Smith | (England) Accrington Stanley | 12 March 2012 | |
| 24 February 2012 | FW | (England) Paul Hayes | (England) Wycombe Wanderers | 23 March 2012 | |
| 24 February 2012 | DF | (Republic of Ireland) Gary Doherty | (England) Wycombe Wanderers | End of season | |
| 17 March 2012 | FW | (England) Leon Clarke | (England) Crawley Town | End of season | |
| 2 May 2012 | GK | (England) Conor Gough | (England) Bristol Rovers | End of season | |
