= Yann Kermorgant =

French footballer (born 1981)

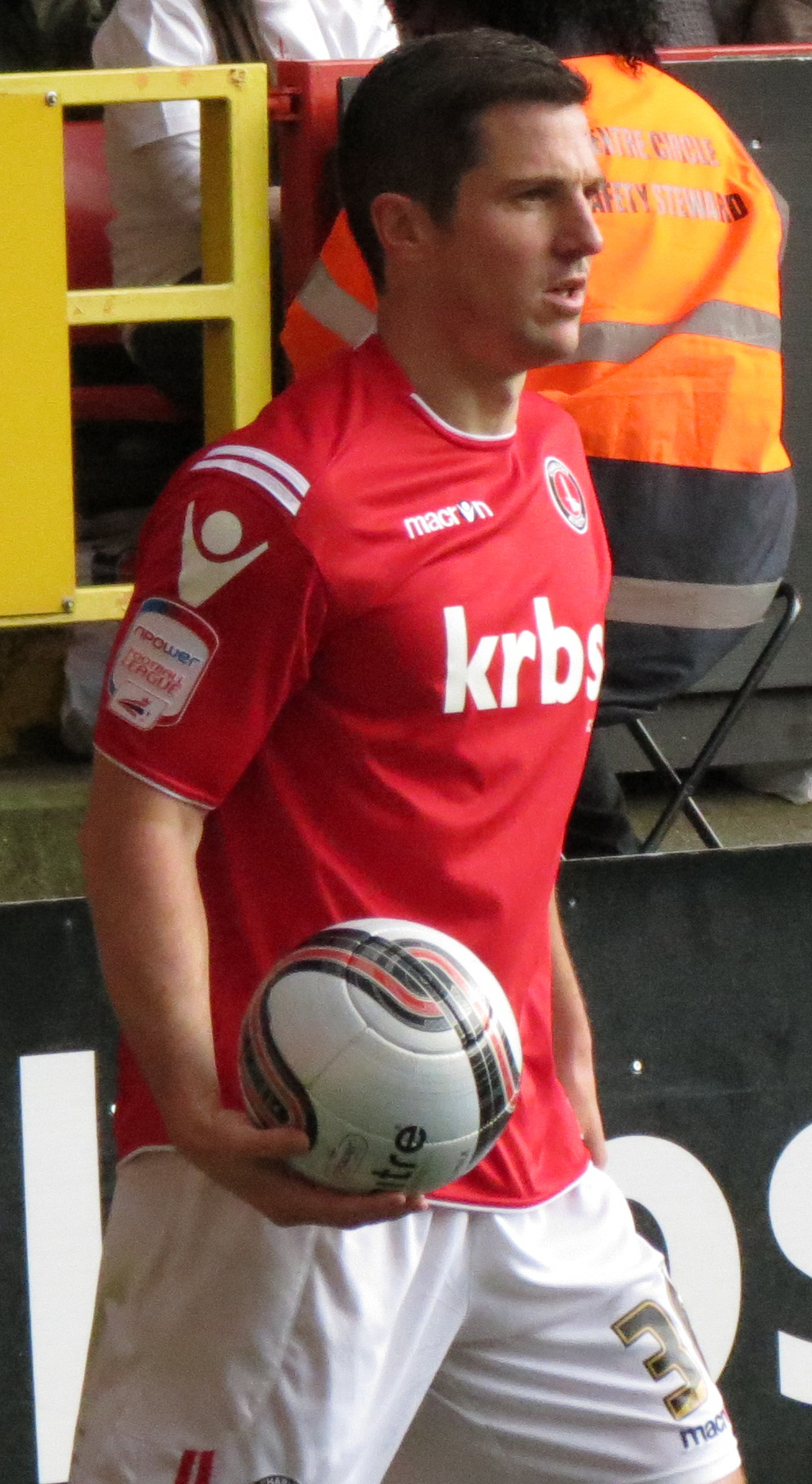
- Kermorgant playing for Charlton Athletic in 2012

Personal information
- Full name: Yann Alain Kermorgant
- Date of birth: 8 November 1981 (age 45)
- Place of birth: Vannes, Morbihan, France
- Height: 1.84 m (6 ft 0 in)
- Position: Striker

Youth career
- AS Ménimur
- Stade Rennais

Senior career*
Years	Team	Apps	(Gls)
2002–2004	Vannes	49	(11)
2004–2005	Châtellerault	29	(14)
2005–2007	Grenoble	58	(16)
2007–2009	Stade Reims	67	(13)
2009–2011	Leicester City	20	(1)
2010–2011	→ Arles-Avignon (loan)	26	(3)
2011–2014	Charlton Athletic	89	(28)
2014–2016	AFC Bournemouth	61	(24)
2016–2018	Reading	84	(23)
2018–2020	Vannes	18	(3)
Total		501	(134)

International career
2013	Brittany	1	(1)
- * Club domestic league appearances and goals

Yann Alain Kermorgant (born 8 November 1981) is a French former professional footballer who played as a striker.

== Club career ==
=== Early career ===
Born in Vannes, Morbihan, Kermorgant began his career with the Stade Rennais Youth Academy, but aged 14 he was the victim of leukaemia, and his career was halted for four years. He was signed for Vannes after initially playing at district-level but impressed the manager on trial. He spent two seasons at Vannes before joining Châtellerault for the 2004–05 season. He scored an impressive 14 league goals and was consequently signed by Grenoble. After two full seasons with Grenoble, having scored 16 goals, he signed for Stade Reims in the summer of 2007. When new manager Luis Fernandez took charge in January 2009, he made Kermorgant the captain. He finished the season with a total of nine goals and nine assists.

=== Leicester City ===
Kermorgant became a free agent after leaving Stade Reims at the end of the 2008–09 season. He entered talks with Championship team Leicester City in July 2009, and was given a trial by the club. Kermorgant was given a second trial after impressing in his initial display.

On 24 August 2009, Leicester signed Kermorgant on a short-term contract until January 2010, beating French club Stade Malherbe Caen for his signature. He made his debut a day later as a 79th minute substitute in a 2–1 League Cup defeat to Preston North End. On 17 December, Kermorgant signed a two-and-a-half-year deal with Leicester, which would last until the end of June 2012. He made his first assist in a 2–1 FA Cup win over Swansea on 2 January 2010.

Feeling the pressure of expectations since arriving, Kermorgant admitted at the end of January that he was still adjusting to life in England. He finally scored his first competitive goal for Leicester, in his 23rd game, in a 2–0 win over Middlesbrough on 2 May 2010. Kermorgant missed a penalty kick in a 4–3 defeat on penalties to Cardiff City in the Championship play-offs semi-final second leg on 12 May 2010. Kermorgant chipped his penalty, which was easily saved by Cardiff keeper David Marshall.

On 23 July 2010, Kermorgant signed for Ligue 1 club AC Arles-Avignon on loan for the rest of the 2010–11 season. He was told he was free to look for a new club on his return to Leicester in August 2011.

=== Charlton Athletic ===
On 13 September 2011, Kermorgant signed a two-year contract at Charlton Athletic, linking back up with his former first team coach at Leicester, Chris Powell. On 27 September 2011, he scored his first goal for the club in the away 1–1 draw with MK Dons. He then continued as the preferred striker to partner Bradley Wright-Phillips, and his aerial ability and consistent performances attracted interest from Celtic in January 2012. Kermorgant won the League 1 title with Charlton Athletic on 5 May 2012, rounding off the season with a goal from an acute angle in a 3–2 victory against Hartlepool United.

On 25 July 2012, Kermorgant signed a new contract with Charlton Athletic, keeping him at the club until at least 2014 with an option for a further 12 months. He scored his first Championship goal for them against his former club Leicester in a 2–1 win at The Valley. He repeated this feat, scoring in the reverse fixture at the King Power Stadium in a win by the same score. Kermorgant finished the season with a double against Bristol City, finishing the year as joint top goalscorer shared with Johnnie Jackson with 12 league goals.

Kermorgant scored his first goal of the 2013–14 season on the first day, with an acrobatic goal against Bournemouth. He once again scored against Leicester along with fellow former Fox Michael Morrison in another 2–1 home win.

=== Bournemouth ===
On transfer deadline day 31 January 2014, Kermorgant signed for Bournemouth on a two-and-a-half-year deal for an undisclosed fee. He made his debut as a second-half substitute against former club Leicester City. On 1 March 2014, Kermorgant celebrated his full debut for Bournemouth by scoring his first goal for the club and his first ever hat-trick in a 5–0 win against Doncaster Rovers.

In Kermorgant's first full season at Dean Court he helped them claim the Championship title winning promotion to the Premier League for the first time in the club's history. Kermorgant scored 17 goals in all competitions and was nominated for the Championship goal of the season award for a bicycle kick in the 2–2 draw against Ipswich Town.

=== Reading ===
On 20 January 2016, Kermorgant signed a one-and-a-half-year deal with Reading.

On 2 January 2017, Kermorgant scored twice in Reading's 3–2 away win over Bristol City, including the 93rd-minute winner, with Reading being 2–0 down in the 70th minute.

On 10 February 2017, Kermorgant signed a new one-year extension to his contract, keeping him at Reading until the summer of 2018. On 1 November 2017, Reading announced that Kermorgant had put off his retirement plans at the end of the season to sign with the club a new contract covering the summer of 2019. Reading announced on 10 July 2018 that Kermorgant's last year of his contract had been terminated by mutual consent.

=== Return to France ===
After training with Vannes OC since the start of the 2018–19 season, Kermorgant signed a contract with the French side Championnat National 2 on 2 October 2018.

He announced his retirement on 22 April 2020.

== International career ==
Kermorgant was included in the Brittany national football team for the friendly match against FIFA member Mali on 28 May 2013. He was a 62nd-minute substitute and scored the only goal nine minutes later.

== Career statistics ==
As of match played 30 June 2020

Appearances and goals by club, season and competition
Club	Season	League			Cup		League Cup		Other		Total	
Club	Season	Division	Apps	Goals	Apps	Goals	Apps	Goals	Apps	Goals	Apps	Goals
Vannes	2002–03	CFA	22	7	0	0	0	0	0	0	22	7
Vannes	2003–04	CFA	27	4	0	0	0	0	0	0	27	4
Vannes	Total		49	11	0	0	0	0	0	0	49	11
Châtellerault	2004–05	CFA	29	14	0	0	0	0	0	0	29	14
Grenoble	2005–06	Ligue 2	26	6	3	3	1	0	0	0	30	9
Grenoble	2006–07	Ligue 2	32	10	3	0	1	0	0	0	36	10
Grenoble	Total		58	16	6	3	2	0	0	0	66	19
Stade Reims	2007–08	Ligue 2	33	4	3	4	1	0	0	0	37	8
Stade Reims	2008–09	Ligue 2	34	9	1	1	1	0	0	0	36	10
Stade Reims	Total		67	13	4	5	2	0	0	0	73	18
Leicester City	2009–10	Championship	20	1	2	0	1	0	2	0	25	1
Arles-Avignon (loan)	2010–11	Ligue 1	26	3	1	1	1	0	0	0	28	4
Charlton Athletic	2011–12	League One	36	12	2	0	0	0	1	0	39	12
Charlton Athletic	2012–13	Championship	32	11	1	0	0	0	0	0	33	11
Charlton Athletic	2013–14	Championship	21	5	2	3	1	0	0	0	24	8
Charlton Athletic	Total		89	28	5	3	1	0	1	0	96	31
Bournemouth	2013–14	Championship	16	9	0	0	0	0	0	0	16	9
Bournemouth	2014–15	Championship	38	15	2	2	2	0	0	0	42	17
Bournemouth	2015–16	Premier League	7	0	1	0	3	1	0	0	11	1
Bournemouth	Total		61	24	3	2	5	1	0	0	69	27
Reading	2015–16	Championship	17	3	0	0	0	0	0	0	17	3
Reading	2016–17	Championship	42	18	1	0	2	0	3	1	48	19
Reading	2017–18	Championship	25	2	2	0	0	0	0	0	27	2
Reading	Total		84	23	3	0	2	0	3	1	92	24
Vannes	2018–19	Championnat National 2 Group B	14	3	0	0	0	0	0	0	14	3
Vannes	2019–20	Championnat National 2 Group B	4	0	0	0	0	0	0	0	4	0
Vannes	Total		18	3	0	0	0	0	0	0	18	3
Career total			501	134	24	14	14	1	6	1	545	150

== Honours ==
Charlton Athletic

- Football League One: 2011–12

Bournemouth

- Football League Championship: 2014–15

Individual

- Charlton Athletic Hall of Fame inductee: 2023
