= Danny Hollands =

English footballer (born 1985)

Personal information
- Full name: Daniel Timothy Hollands
- Date of birth: 6 November 1985 (age 41)
- Place of birth: Ashford, England
- Height: 5 ft 11 in (1.80 m)
- Position: Midfielder

Team information
- Current team: Bognor Regis Town (manager)

Youth career
- 2001–2003: Chelsea

Senior career*
Years	Team	Apps	(Gls)
2003–2006	Chelsea	0	(0)
2006	→ Torquay United (loan)	10	(1)
2006–2011	AFC Bournemouth	193	(24)
2011–2014	Charlton Athletic	57	(7)
2012–2013	→ Swindon Town (loan)	10	(2)
2013	→ Gillingham (loan)	17	(1)
2014	→ Portsmouth (loan)	7	(5)
2014–2016	Portsmouth	76	(1)
2016–2017	Crewe Alexandra	24	(1)
2017–2022	Eastleigh	157	(10)
2022–2025	Gosport Borough	101	(4)
2025	Bognor Regis Town	1	(0)
Total		653	(56)

Managerial career
- 2025: Gosport Borough (joint-manager)
- 2026–: Bognor Regis Town
- * Club domestic league appearances and goals

Daniel Timothy Hollands (born 6 November 1985) is a former English professional footballer who is the manager of Isthmian League South Central Division club Bognor Regis Town.

== Career ==
=== Chelsea ===
Born in Ashford, England, Hollands played for Hampton & Richmond at a young age before being offered a trial at Chelsea, where it was successful and subsequently signed for them. There, as a trainee, Hollands began his professional football career and signed a three–year scholarships with the club in July 2002. Having progressed through the ranks at the academy, Hollands turned professional in November 2003.

He captained the Chelsea Youth Team and had been captain of their reserve side until joining Torquay United on loan in March 2006. He made his league debut in a 1–0 home victory against Peterborough United and played ten times, scoring once in the crucial 4–0 win at home to Stockport County as Torquay turned their season around and eventually survived relegation on the last day of the season.

In the close season, he was released by Chelsea, without making a first team appearance.

=== AFC Bournemouth ===
After being released by Chelsea, Hollands signed for AFC Bournemouth on a two-year deal, becoming the club's fourth signings this season. Prior to the move, Hollands was linked with a move to Millwall and Brentford.

Hollands made his Bournemouth debut on 8 August 2006, where he made his first start and played the whole game, in a 0–0 draw against Yeovil Town. After suffering from a groin injury, he scored his first Bournemouth goal of the season on 3 November 2006, in a 4–2 win over Swansea City. He scored again on 11 November 2006, in the first round of FA Cup, in a 4–0 win over Boston United. From that moment on, Hollands had a run in of first team football under management of Kevin Bond as the 2006–07 season progressed. In his first season, Hollands went on to make thirty–eight appearances and scoring two times in all competitions. For his performance, he was the club's goal of the season, as well as, PFA supporters' player of the month.

In the 2007–08 season, Hollands said his aim this season was to "improve as a player" in order to get first team football. However, he missed out the start of the season, due to a hamstring injury. After returning to the first team in early–September, he scored his first goal of the season, in a 4–1 loss against Swindon Town on 22 September 2007. It wasn't until on 20 November 2007 when he scored again, but was sent–off for a second bookable offence, in a 3–2 win over Barrow in the second round replay of the FA Cup. However, during the match against Barrow, he suffered a hernia injury in the process. After an eventual recovery from the injury and served two match suspension, he returned to the first team and then scored again on 26 January 2008, in a 3–1 win over Port Vale. A week later, on 2 February 2008 against Nottingham Forest, Hollands captained the side for the first time in his career, which saw them win 2–0. Despite being sidelined twice, due to "dead leg" injury and suspension, he scored again on 15 March 2008, in a 2–0 win over Yeovil Town. Hollands also scored his fifth goal on 19 April 2008, in a 3–1 win over Walsall. However, despite good performances and effort as the season progressed, the club were relegated to League Two, due to the club entered administration along the way. At the end of 2007–08 season, Hollands went on to make forty–three appearances and scoring five times in all competitions. For his performance, Hollands was awarded the Daily Echo/Micky Cave's Player of the Year.

Ahead of the 2008–09 season, Hollands was keen on signing a new contract with the club despite their relegation to League Two. As a result, he was linked a move away from Bournemouth, as Colchester United was keen on signing him. In the end, Hollands agreed to stay at the club this season, eventually signing a new contract, keeping him until 2010. However, he missed the start of the season, due to suffering a knee injury. Despite aiming to return to the first team in September, he returned to the first team and scored his first goal of the season, a week later on 2 September 2008, in a 3–0 win over Bristol Rovers in the first round of the Football League Trophy. Following an end to the game against Accrington Stanley on 15 November 2008, which saw them lose 3–0, Hollands was involved in alteration with the club's supporters in the final whistle, prompting to apologise afterwards. By the end of 2008, Hollands went on to score two more goals against Bradford City and Wycombe Wanderers. On 3 January 2009, Hollands scored again, in a 2–1 loss against Darlington, followed up his sending off in the next game, in a 1–0 loss against Rotherham United. After serving a one match suspension, Hollands scored in the next game, on 17 January 2009, in a 1–1 draw against Luton Town. As the 2008–09 season progressed, he went on to score two more goals against Aldershot Town and Exeter City. At the end of the 2008–09 season, he helped the club survive relegation, having started the season with deducted points. He also went on to make forty–eight appearances and scoring seven times in all competitions.

Ahead of the 2009–10 season, Hollands was appointed as a new captain. He also agreed on staying after being paid by 12 June 2009 following a 14-day notice from the Football League. However, at the start of the season, Hollands missed out, due to suffering a knee injury. It wasn't until on 5 September 2009 when he returned to the first team, coming on as a late substitute, in a 2–1 win over Torquay United. Between 6 October 2009 and 17 October 2009, Hollands scored three times in three matches against Northampton Town, Chesterfield and Accrington Stanley. By January 2010, Hollands was replaced by Jason Pearce as captain. Manager Eddie Howe went on to explain on removing as a captain, stating that he wanted to concentrate on football and Hollands, himself, agreed on being removed as captain. Despite this, Hollands scored a brace twice later in the season against Rotherham United and Notts County. Despite being sidelined once again, Having helped the club's promotion to the League One for next season, Hollands went on to make forty–two appearances and scoring seven times in all competitions. At the end of the 2009–10 season, Hollands signed a contract extension with the club, keeping him until 2011.

In the 2010–11 season, Hollands continued to help the club with a winning start for the side in League One. Having started the season, appearing coming on from the bench, he regained his first team place in the midfield position throughout the season. He then scored his first goal of the season on 16 October 2010, in a 3–2 win over MK Dons. By the end of 2010, he went on to score two more goals against Brentford and Yeovil Town. Hollands also went on to score four goals later in the season against Plymouth Argyle, Swindon Town, Oldham Athletic and Charlton Athletic. However, he was then sent–off in the first half for a second bookable offence on 25 April 2011, in a 2–1 win over Bristol Rovers. But he appeared twice in the play–offs and started in both legs, which they lost in the penalty shootout and turned out to be his last appearance for the club. He went on to make forty–eight appearances and scoring seven times in all competitions in the 2010–11 season.

At the end of the 2010–11 season, Hollands was offered a new contract by the club. Though he wanted to stay at the club, Hollands, however, rejected a new contract from the club, leading him to expect leaving the club.

=== Charlton Athletic ===
Hollands chose not to renew his contract upon its expiry at the end of the 2010–11 season and subsequently signed for Charlton Athletic on 24 May 2011. Hollands later reflected that he left for Charlton Athletic for both professional and family reasons. Upon joining the club, he signed a three–year contract.

Hollands made his Charlton Athletic debut, in the opening game of the season, where he started and played the whole game, against his former club Bournemouth. He scored his first two goals for Charlton in a 2–3 away win at Rochdale on 17 September. Between 22 October 2011 and 13 November 2011, Hollands scored four goals in five appearances in all competitions against Carlisle United, Hartlepool United, Preston North End and FC Halifax Town. Hollands was able to score one more goal by the end of 2011, which was against Yeovil Town on 26 December 2011. However, Hollands was then sent–off in the first half of the match against Oldham Athletic on 7 April 2012, which saw them win 1–0. For that, he served a three–match suspension; up until his sending off, he was an ever–present player at the club since the start of the season. After returning to the first team from the suspension, Hollands then scored in the last game of the season, in a 3–2 win over Hartlepool United. At the end of the 2011–12, in which saw Charlton Athletic were promoted to the Championship, Hollands made forty–six appearances and scoring eight times in all competitions.

In the 2012–13 season, Hollands continued to be a first team regular at the start of the season and provided an assist for Yann Kermorgant to score the second goal in the game, in a 2–1 win over Leicester City on 21 August 2012. Hollands did so again when he set up a goal for Johnnie Jackson to score an equaliser, in a 1–1 draw against Blackburn Rovers on 29 September 2012. By the following month in October, Hollands began to struggle in the first team, due to performances from Dorian Dervite, Bradley Pritchard and Jackson. After his loan spell at Swindon Town came to an end, Hollands continued to recover from stress fracture to his metatarsal in his left foot. It wasn't until on 27 April 2013 when he made his return to the first team, making his first start in months for the side, in a 2–2 draw against Middlesbrough. At the end of the 2012–13 season, Hollands finished the season, making fifteen appearances for the side.

In the 2013–14 season, Hollands' only appearance for the side came on in the first round of the League Cup, in a 4–0 loss against Oxford United. At the end of the 2013–14 season Hollands was released by Charlton. During his time at Charlton, he became the club's fan favourite.

=== Loan spells at Swindon Town and Gillingham ===
On 15 November 2012, Hollands joined League One side Swindon Town on loan until 5 March 2013. He made his Swindon Town debut two day later, on 17 November 2012, where he set up one of the goals, in a 4–1 win over Yeovil Town. Hollands then scored his first goal for the club on 21 December 2012, in a 5–0 win over Tranmere Rovers, followed up by scoring in a 5–0 win over Peterborough United on 1 January 2013. Because of this, Hollands had his loan spell at Swindon Town extended for another twenty–eight days. It came after when Manager Paulo Di Canio offered to pay £30,000 of his own money to keep Hollands, along with John Bostock and Chris Martin, whilst Swindon under a transfer embargo and in financial difficulty. However, during a 2–0 win over Shrewsbury Town on 19 January 2013, Hollands suffered a stress fracture to his metatarsal in his left foot and was substituted as a result. On 1 February 2013, he returned to his parent club, with his loan spell expired, as well as, his own injury concern.

On 29 August 2013, Hollands joined Gillingham on a three-month loan. Two days later, on 31 August 2013, he made his Gillingham debut, where he came on as a second-half substitute and played 38 minutes, in a 1–1 draw against Bristol City. He scored his first goal for Gillingham in a 3–2 win over Milton Keynes Dons on 5 October. From that moment on, Hollands quickly became a first team regular at Gillingham in the midfield position for the club and since his debut, he started every match until he suffered an injury during a 2–2 draw against Peterborough United on 14 December 2013, resulting him being substituted. Following this, he never played again and returned to his parent club in early–January.

=== Portsmouth ===
On 27 March 2014, Hollands joined Portsmouth on loan for the remainder of the campaign.

Hollands made his Portsmouth debut two days later on 29 March 2014, where he started the whole game, in a 2–1 win over Newport County. Hollands scored his first goal on 12 April 2014, in a 4–1 win over Dagenham & Redbridge; followed up by scoring in the next game on 19 April 2014, in a 3–2 win over Bristol Rovers. After adding his third goal, in a 4–4 draw against Bury on 26 April 2014, He scored a hat-trick on the last day of the season against Plymouth Argyle, and contributed with six goals in seven appearances for "Pompey" during his loan spell.

On 22 May 2014, Hollands joined Portsmouth in a permanent basis, signing a two-year deal. Upon joining the club, he was given a number 29 shirt, a shirt he wore whilst on loan. He made his second Portsmouth debut in the opening game of the season, in a 1–1 draw against Newport County. But following Ben Chorley's injury, he captained the side for the first time on 16 September 2014, in a 3–0 win over Dagenham & Redbridge. Hollands scored his first Portsmouth goal since joining them on a permanent basis, in a 3–0 win over Carlisle United on 1 November 2014, followed up by scoring in a 2–2 draw against Aldershot Town in the first round of FA Cup. Hollands then captained the side once again on 17 March 2015, in a 2–2 draw against Cheltenham Town. Despite appearing as an unused substitute on two occasions and being once left out of the squad in late–December, Hollands finished the 2014–15 season, making forty–eight appearances and scoring two times in all competitions.

In the 2015–16 season, Hollands was often used in first team ins and out since the start of the season and appeared on the substitute bench on numerous occasion, but regained his first team place by the end of September. He continued to be in the first team until he suffered a broken leg during a 2–2 draw against Ipswich Town in the FA Cup match. After being sidelined for six weeks, he returned to the first team on 27 February 2016, in a 2–1 win over Cambridge United and was named Man of the Match. On 26 April 2016, Hollands provided an assist for Michael Smith to score the only goal in the game, with a win against AFC Wimbledon. Although he suffered an injury towards the end of the 2015–16 season, Hollands went on to make thirty–nine appearances and scored none in all competitions.

With his contract expiring, talks between the club and Hollands proceeded. Hollands expressed desire to stay at the club. Local newspaper, Portsmouth News, called on the club to keep him. Despite this, Hollands continued to remain at the club throughout pre–season tour ahead of the new season. Though it looked like Hollands' future at Portsmouth was secured, it was reported on 18 August 2016 that he might leave the club after failing to agree new terms.

=== Crewe Alexandra ===
On 19 August 2016, Hollands joined Crewe Alexandra on a five-month contract to January 2017, later extended to the end of the season.

Hollands made his Crewe Alexandra the next day, where he came on as a second-half substitute, in a 1–1 draw against Newport County. He scored his first Crewe goal in a 2–0 win over Exeter City at Gresty Road on 10 September 2016. On 18 February 2017, playing against Wycombe Wanderers at Gresty Road, Hollands suffered a hamstring injury that ruled him out of the rest of the season. On 9 May 2017, Crewe announced that Hollands had been released by the club, but manager David Artell was set to hold new contract talks with Hollands once he had proved his fitness.

=== Eastleigh ===
In May, Hollands signed for Eastleigh, which was close to his Portsmouth home. His first goal for Eastleigh was in a 3–1 win against Hampshire rivals Aldershot Town. He scored a vital goal for the Spitfires when he scored in extra time against Wrexham in the 2018–19 play-off eliminator. Hollands was released at the end of the 2021–22 season.

=== Gosport Borough ===
In June 2022, Hollands signed for Gosport Borough.

On 9 October 2025, after a brief spell as joint-manager, he announced he was leaving the club.

=== Bognor Regis Town ===
In November 2025, Hollands joined Isthmian League South Central Division club Bognor Regis Town on a short-term deal. He was then appointed as manager in February 2026.

== Career statistics ==
As of end of 2024–25 season

Appearances and goals by club, season and competition
Club	Season	League			FA Cup		League Cup		Other		Total	
Club	Season	Division	Apps	Goals	Apps	Goals	Apps	Goals	Apps	Goals	Apps	Goals
Chelsea	2005–06	Premier League	0	0	0	0	0	0	0	0	0	0
Torquay United (loan)	2005–06	League Two	10	1	0	0	0	0	0	0	10	1
AFC Bournemouth	2006–07	League One	33	1	3	1	1	0	1 (Note: Appearances in the Football League Trophy)	0	38	2
AFC Bournemouth	2007–08	League One	37	4	3	1	0	0	3	0	43	5
AFC Bournemouth	2008–09	League Two	42	6	3	0	0	0	3	1	48	7
AFC Bournemouth	2009–10	League Two	39	6	2	0	0	0	1	1	42	7
AFC Bournemouth	2010–11	League One	42	7	2	0	1	0	3 (Note: One appearance in the Football League Trophy and two in the League One play-offs)	0	48	7
AFC Bournemouth	Total		193	24	13	2	2	0	11	2	219	28
Charlton Athletic	2011–12	League One	43	7	3	1	0	0	0	0	46	8
Charlton Athletic	2012–13	Championship	14	0	0	0	1	0	—		15	0
Charlton Athletic	2013–14	Championship	0	0	0	0	1	0	—		1	0
Charlton Athletic	Total		57	7	3	1	2	0	0	0	62	8
Swindon Town (loan)	2012–13	League One	10	2	0	0	0	0	—		10	2
Gillingham (loan)	2013–14	League One	17	1	0	0	0	0	1	0	18	1
Portsmouth (loan)	2013–14	League Two	7	5	0	0	0	0	—		7	5
Portsmouth	2014–15	League Two	44	1	2	1	2	0	0	0	48	2
Portsmouth	2015–16	League Two	32	0	3	0	2	0	2 (Note: Appearances in the League Two play-offs)	0	39	0
Portsmouth	Total		83	6	5	1	4	0	2	0	94	7
Crewe Alexandra	2016–17	League Two	24	1	2	0	1	0	2 (Note: Appearances in the EFL Trophy)	0	29	1
Eastleigh	2017–18	National League	33	0	0	0	—		1 (Note: Appearance in the FA Trophy)	0	34	0
Eastleigh	2018–19	National League	34	1	0	0	—		3 (Note: Appearance(s) in National League play-offs)	1	37	2
Eastleigh	2019–20	National League	37	10	6	0	—		1	0	44	10
Eastleigh	2020–21	National League	31	0	1	0	—		1	0	33	0
Eastleigh	2021–22	National League	22	2	2	0	—		2	0	26	2
Eastleigh	Total		157	13	9	0	0	0	8	1	174	14
Gosport Borough	2022–23	Southern League; Premier Division South	33	0	3	0	—		3 (Note: One appearance in Hampshire Senior Cup, one appearance in FA Trophy, one appearance in Portsmouth Senior Cup)	0	39	0
Gosport Borough	2023–24	Southern League Premier Division South	40	3	4	0	—		3 (Note: Two appearances in FA Trophy, one appearance in Southern League Premier Division South play-offs)	0	47	3
Gosport Borough	2024–25	Southern League Premier Division South	28	1	5	0	—		2	0	35	1
Gosport Borough	Total		101	4	12	0	0	0	8	0	121	4
Career total			652	59	44	4	9	0	32	3	737	66

== Managerial statistics ==
As of 25 May 2026

Team	From	To	Record				
Team	From	To	G	W	D	L	Win %
Bognor Regis Town	26 February 2026	Present	10	4	6	0	40

== Personal life ==
Growing up in Ashford, Middlesex, Hollands attended Felpham Community College until he left at 16, doing well at school. During his teenage years, he also lived on the south coast. He supported Tottenham Hotspur and was a season-ticket holder.

Hollands' father, Tim, was also a footballer and holds the all-time record of appearances for Hampton and Richmond.

Hollands has been married to his wife Natalie since he was 21. They first met when they were both 15, and have three daughters, Sofia, Annabella and Mia.

== Honours ==
Charlton Athletic

- Football League One: 2011–12
