= Danny Green (footballer, born 1988) =

English footballer (born 1988)

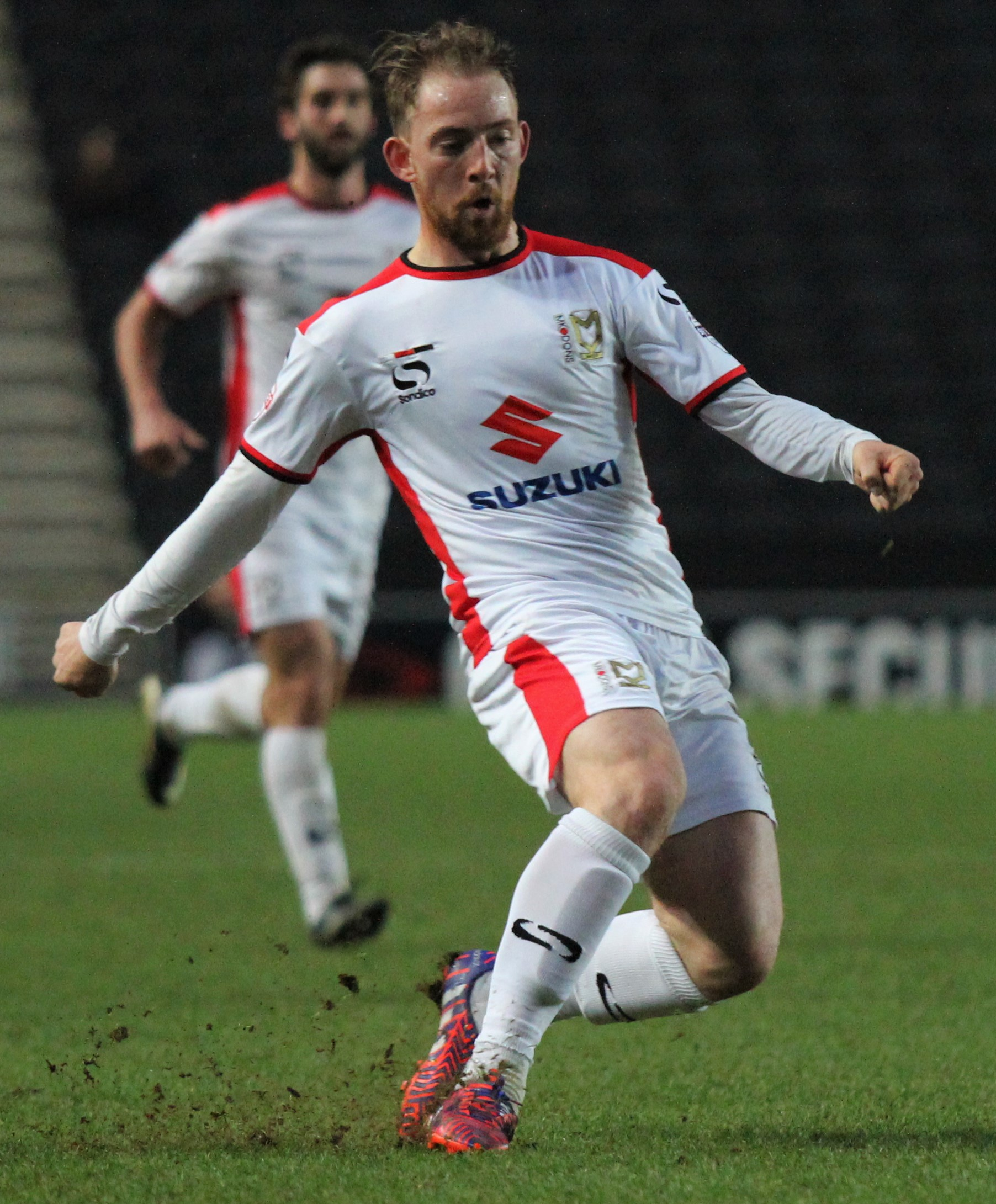
- Green playing for Milton Keynes Dons in 2015

Personal information
- Full name: Daniel Richard Green
- Date of birth: 9 July 1988 (age 38)
- Place of birth: Harlow, England
- Height: 5 ft 11 in (1.80 m)
- Position: Right winger

Team information
- Current team: St Albans City (assistant manager)

Youth career
- –2003: Charlton Athletic
- 2003–2004: Northampton Town
- 2004–2007: Nottingham Forest

Senior career*
Years	Team	Apps	(Gls)
2007–2008	Nottingham Forest	0	(0)
2008–2009	Bishop's Stortford	28	(4)
2009–2011	Dagenham & Redbridge	88	(24)
2011–2014	Charlton Athletic	62	(4)
2013	→ Milton Keynes Dons (loan)	5	(0)
2014–2015	Milton Keynes Dons	14	(1)
2015–2017	Luton Town	25	(5)
2017–2018	Chelmsford City	25	(2)
2018–2022	Concord Rangers	153	(18)
Total		400	(54)
- * Club domestic league appearances and goals as of 17:10, 13 June 2023 (UTC)

Daniel Richard Green (born 9 July 1988) is an English semi-professional footballer and coach who played as a right winger. He is currently assistant manager of St Albans City.

Green spent his youth with Charlton Athletic and Northampton Town, before he joined Nottingham Forest in 2004. He dropped into non-league with Bishop's Stortford after picking up a bad injury at Forest. His performances earned him a return to the Football League with Dagenham & Redbridge in May 2009. Green won the 2010 League Two play-off final at Wembley Stadium and promotion to League One with Dagenham, before he was sold on to Charlton for a £350,000 fee in June 2011. He helped the club win the League One title in 2011–12, but struggled for matches in the Championship, and joined Milton Keynes Dons in May 2014 following a short loan spell earlier in 2013–14. He was also promoted out of League One with the Dons in 2014–15, and was then allowed to move on to Luton Town in July 2015. He secured a first-team place until breaking his leg in April 2016, which caused him to miss the entire 2016–17 season.

== Career ==
=== Early career ===
Green began his career with the youth system at Charlton Athletic before being released at the age of 15. He then signed for Northampton Town, and moved to Nottingham Forest in 2004. In 2008, Green was released by Nottingham Forest after picking up a bad injury and signed for Conference South club Bishop's Stortford after meeting manager Martin Hayes on a coaching course. He later admitted that he probably would have quit football had Bishop's Stortford not expressed an interest in signing him. Green scored four goals in 32 matches for Bishop's Stortford in 2008–09.

=== Dagenham & Redbridge ===
In May 2009, Green signed for League Two club Dagenham & Redbridge on a free transfer. He made his debut in a 2–1 win away to Crewe Alexandra on the opening day of 2009–10, in which he was substituted in the 75th minute. Green scored twice on his home debut in a 5–3 victory over Torquay United at Victoria Road a week later. He scored two braces in the space of three days in April, which included three penalties and a direct free kick from 30 yards in a 2–2 draw away to Chesterfield and a 4–1 victory at home to Barnet. Green played in both legs of the play-off semi-final victory over Morecambe, which finished 7–2 on aggregate. He started in the 2010 League Two play-off final at Wembley Stadium, in which he scored Dagenham's second goal in their 3–2 victory over Rotherham United to win promotion to League One. Green finished the season with 14 goals from 52 appearances and provided 16 assists. He signed a new three-year contract with Dagenham in July 2010. Dagenham were relegated back to League Two at the end of 2010–11 after a 5–0 defeat away to Peterborough United on the final day of the season, but Green was one of the club's stand-out performers, scoring 13 goals and providing 12 assists.

=== Charlton Athletic ===
On 29 June 2011, Green was signed by Charlton Athletic for a fee of £350,000, signing a three-year contract. He helped Chris Powell's team win the League One title in 2011–12 and therefore promotion to the Championship in his first season with 32 appearances and three goals. However, he struggled to hold down a first team position in the Championship, making 18 appearances and scoring one goal in 2012–13. On 2 September 2013, Green agreed a six-week loan with League One club Milton Keynes Dons. He made six appearances for the Dons, before returning to The Valley, scoring two goals in 19 appearances for Charlton in 2013–14. At the end of the season, Green was released by the club in May 2014.

=== Milton Keynes Dons ===
Green returned to Milton Keynes Dons on 23 May 2014, signing a two-year contract. Manager Karl Robinson said "he gives us another exciting option out wide, to go along with Daniel Powell and Dean Bowditch". He made 18 appearances and scored twice in all competitions during the 2014–15 season, as the Dons won promotion to the Championship as runners-up in League One. He left Stadium mk in July 2015 after Milton Keynes Dons agreed to cancel Green's contract a year early.

=== Luton Town ===
On 4 July 2015, Green signed a two-year contract with League Two club Luton Town, linking back up with manager John Still who had first signed him at Dagenham & Redbridge in 2009. He made his debut in a 1–1 draw away to Accrington Stanley on the opening day of 2015–16. Green scored his first goals for Luton in consecutive matches when he opened the scoring in a 2–1 win at home to Leyton Orient in the Football League Trophy on 1 September, before netting the final goal in a 3–1 win away to Cambridge United four days later. However, he fell out of favour after Still felt he lacked "urgency" and "passion". In his first league appearance for almost two months, Green opened the scoring in a 2–0 win over Barnet at Kenilworth Road on 14 November. He scored his fourth goal of the season 10 days later in a 4–3 defeat at home to Carlisle United. Green netted a penalty kick after a foul on Craig Mackail-Smith in another 4–3 defeat, on this occasion at home to Northampton Town on 12 December. Green scored his fifth goal in 10 league starts for Luton in a 3–2 win away to Exeter City a week later. On 30 April 2016, Green suffered a double leg break during a 2–0 defeat away to Northampton Town. He finished 2015–16 with 30 appearances and six goals. Green missed the entire 2016–17 season as a result of the injury, and was released when his contract expired at the end of the season. Manager Nathan Jones said "we've put it out that Danny won't be moving forward with us, but Danny knew that and we've got to make sure he comes back safely and prolongs his career and we think we've done that".

=== Chelmsford City ===
Green went on trial with newly relegated League Two club Port Vale in July 2017, before signing for National League South club Chelmsford City in August 2017. On 26 August 2017, Green made his debut as a 58th-minute substitute in a 2–0 win over Truro City.

=== Concord Rangers ===
On 13 May 2018, Green signed for fellow National League South club Concord Rangers on a two-year contract. Green took on the role of player-coach in June 2020.

On 16 October 2022, it was announced that Green had left the club.

== Coaching career ==
In November 2025, Green was appointed assistant manager of Isthmian League Premier Division club St Albans City.

== Career statistics ==
As of match played 22 October 2022

Appearances and goals by club, season and competition
Season	Club	League			FA Cup		League Cup		Other		Total	
Season	Club	Division	Apps	Goals	Apps	Goals	Apps	Goals	Apps	Goals	Apps	Goals
Nottingham Forest	2007–08	League One	0	0	0	0	0	0	0	0	0	0
Bishop's Stortford	2008–09	Conference South	28	4	1	0	—		3 (Note: One appearance in Conference League Cup, two in FA Trophy)	0	32	4
Dagenham & Redbridge	2009–10	League Two	46	13	1	0	1	0	4 (Note: One appearance in Football League Trophy, three in League Two play-offs)	1	52	14
Dagenham & Redbridge	2010–11	League One	42	11	2	2	0	0	1 (Note: Appearance(s) in Football League Trophy)	0	45	13
Dagenham & Redbridge	Total		88	24	3	2	1	0	5	1	97	27
Charlton Athletic	2011–12	League One	32	3	2	0	2	0	1	0	37	3
Charlton Athletic	2012–13	Championship	17	1	0	0	1	0	—		18	1
Charlton Athletic	2013–14	Championship	13	0	4	1	2	1	—		19	2
Charlton Athletic	Total		62	4	6	1	5	1	1	0	74	6
Milton Keynes Dons (loan)	2013–14	League One	5	0	—		—		1	0	6	0
Milton Keynes Dons	2014–15	League One	14	1	2	1	2	0	0	0	18	2
Milton Keynes Dons	Total		19	1	2	1	2	0	1	0	24	2
Luton Town	2015–16	League Two	25	5	2	0	1	0	2	1	30	6
Luton Town	2016–17	League Two	0	0	0	0	0	0	0	0	0	0
Luton Town	Total		25	5	2	0	1	0	2	1	30	6
Chelmsford City	2017–18	National League South	25	2	5	0	—		6 (Note: Four appearances and one goal in Essex Senior Cup, two appearances in FA Trophy)	1	36	3
Concord Rangers	2018–19	National League South	38	2	3	0	—		2 (Note: One appearance in Essex Senior Cup, one in FA Trophy)	0	43	2
Concord Rangers	2019–20	National League South	25	1	1	0	—		9 (Note: Four appearances in Essex Senior Cup, five appearances and two goals in FA Trophy)	2	35	3
Concord Rangers	2020–21	National League South	40	0	1	1	—		1	0	42	1
Concord Rangers	2021–22	National League South	39	13	0	0	—		1	0	40	13
Concord Rangers	2022–23	National League South	11	2	0	0	—		0	0	11	2
Concord Rangers	Total		153	18	5	1	—		13	2	171	21
Career total			400	54	24	5	9	1	31	5	462	65

== Honours ==
Dagenham & Redbridge

- Football League Two play-offs: 2010

Charlton Athletic

- Football League One: 2011–12

Milton Keynes Dons

- Football League One runner-up: 2014–15
