= 2013–14 Charlton Athletic F.C. season =

Charlton Athletic F.C.
- Chairman: Michael Slater (until 3 January); Roland Duchâtelet (from 3 January)
- Manager: Chris Powell (until 11 March); José Riga (from 11 March)
- Stadium: The Valley
- Championship: 18th
- FA Cup: Sixth round
- League Cup: Second round
- Top goalscorer: League: Marvin Sordell (7); All: Yann Kermorgant, Marvin Sordell (8)
- Highest home attendance: 23,600 (vs. Wigan Athletic, 27 October)
- Lowest home attendance: 4,935 (vs. Oxford United, 6 August)
- Average home league attendance: 16,134
Home colours	Away colours	Third colours

During the 2013–14 English football season, Charlton Athletic competed in the Football League Championship for the second consecutive season. Along with competing in the Championship, the club also participated in the FA Cup and League Cup. The season covered the period from 1 July 2013 to 30 June 2014.

== Kit ==
Sportswear giants Nike were Kit suppliers, with Andrews Air Conditioning being the front of shirt sponsor.

== Squad statistics ==
=== Appearances and goals ===
As of 3 May 2014

No.	Pos	Nat	Player	Total		Championship		FA Cup		League Cup	
No.	Pos	Nat	Player	Apps	Goals	Apps	Goals	Apps	Goals	Apps	Goals
1	GK	(England) ENG	Ben Hamer	37	0	32	0	3	0	2	0
2	MF	(England) ENG	Andrew Hughes	8	0	1+6	0	0+1	0	0	0
3	DF	(Cameroon) CMR	Cedric Evina	12	0	4+4	0	2	0	2	0
4	MF	(England) ENG	Johnnie Jackson (C)	44	5	34+4	5	5	0	1	0
5	DF	(England) ENG	Michael Morrison	51	2	45	1	5	1	1	0
6	DF	(France) FRA	Dorian Dervite	44	2	33+7	2	2+1	0	1	0
7	MF	(England) ENG	Danny Green	19	2	5+8	0	1+3	1	1+1	1
8	MF	(England) ENG	Dale Stephens	30	4	24+2	3	2	0	2	1
8	FW	(Iran) IRI	Reza Ghoochannejhad	17	1	10+5	1	0+2	0	0	0
9	FW	(Wales) WAL	Simon Church (Note: Church was born in High Wycombe, England, but also qualified to represent Wales through his grandparents and represented them at U-21 level before making his international debut for Wales in May 2009.)	44	7	28+10	3	5	2	1	2
10	FW	(England) ENG	Marvin Sordell	35	8	20+11	7	1+1	0	1+1	1
11	MF	(England) ENG	Callum Harriott (Note: Harriott was born in Croydon, England, and represented them at U-19 level, but also qualified to represent Guyana and Jamaica internationally and would make his international debut for Guyana in March 2019.)	34	6	17+11	5	4+1	1	0+1	0
12	GK	(England) ENG	Ben Alnwick	12	0	10	0	2	0	0	0
12	FW	(England) ENG	Jonathan Obika	12	0	3+9	0	0	0	0	0
13	GK	(England) ENG	Dillon Phillips	0	0	0	0	0	0	0	0
14	MF	(Zimbabwe) ZIM	Bradley Pritchard	20	0	12+5	0	1+1	0	1	0
15	DF	(England) ENG	Richard Wood	26	0	18+3	0	3	0	2	0
16	DF	(Wales) WAL	Rhoys Wiggins (Note: Wiggins was born in Hillingdon, England, but also qualified to represent Wales internationally and represented them at U-17, U-19, and U-21 level.)	40	0	38	0	2	0	0	0
17	FW	(England) ENG	Jordan Cook	5	0	1+2	0	1	0	1	0
18	FW	(France) FRA	Yann Kermorgant	24	8	17+4	5	2	3	0+1	0
18	FW	(England) ENG	Marcus Tudgay	3	0	0+2	0	1	0	0	0
18	MF	(Italy) ITA	Davide Petrucci	5	0	0+5	0	0	0	0	0
19	MF	(England) ENG	Danny Hollands	1	0	0	0	0	0	1	0
20	DF	(England) ENG	Chris Solly	12	0	10+2	0	0	0	0	0
21	GK	(Guadeloupe) GLP	Yohann Thuram-Ulien (Note: Thuram-Ulien was born in Courcouronnes (now Évry-Courcouronnes), France, and represented them at U-20 and U-21 level, but also qualified to represent Guadeloupe internationally through his parents and was called up by Guadeloupe in March 2009 before making his international debut for them in 2016.)	4	0	4	0	0	0	0	0
22	MF	(Turkey) TUR	Anıl Koç (Note: Koç was born in Saint-Josse-ten-Noode, Belgium, and represented them at U-15 and U-16 level, but also qualified to represent Turkey internationally and represented them at U-17 and U-19 level.)	0	0	0	0	0	0	0	0
23	DF	(England) ENG	Lawrie Wilson	49	2	39+3	2	5	0	2	0
24	MF	(England) ENG	Jordan Cousins	47	2	37+5	2	3+1	0	0+1	0
25	DF	(France) FRA	Loïc Négo	1	0	1	0	0	0	0	0
26	FW	(Poland) POL	Piotr Parzyszek	1	0	0+1	0	0	0	0	0
27	MF	(England) ENG	Mark Gower	7	0	6+1	0	0	0	0	0
28	DF	(Guyana) GUY	Leon Cort (Note: Cort was born in Southwark, England, but also qualified to represent Guyana internationally and made his international debut for Guyana in 2010.)	5	0	1+2	0	0	0	1+1	0
29	DF	(Ireland) EIR	Kevin Feely (Note: Feely was born in Brussels, Belgium, but also qualified to represent the Republic of Ireland internationally and represented them at U-21 level.)	0	0	0	0	0	0	0	0
30	GK	(England) ENG	Nick Pope	0	0	0	0	0	0	0	0
31	DF	(England) ENG	Harry Lennon	3	0	1+1	0	0+1	0	0	0
32	MF	(England) ENG	Cameron Stewart	18	3	15+3	3	0	0	0	0
33	DF	(England) ENG	Harry Osbourne	0	0	0	0	0	0	0	0
34	FW	(England) ENG	Michael Smith	0	0	0	0	0	0	0	0
35	FW	(England) ENG	Joe Pigott	14	1	2+9	0	0+1	0	2	1
36	DF	(Wales) WAL	Morgan Fox (Note: Fox was born in Chelmsford, England, but also qualified to represent Wales internationally and represented them at U-21 level.)	7	0	5+1	0	1	0	0	0
37	MF	(England) ENG	Bradley Jordan	0	0	0	0	0	0	0	0
38	FW	(England) ENG	Ade Azeez	0	0	0	0	0	0	0	0
39	MF	(England) ENG	Diego Poyet (Note: Poyet was born in Zaragoza, Spain, but was raised in England from the age of 2 and also qualified to represent Uruguay internationally through his father. He represented England at U-16 and U-17 level and would go on to represent Uruguay at U-20 level.)	23	0	20	0	2+1	0	0	0
40	DF	(England) ENG	Kadell Daniel (Note: Daniel was born in Lambeth, England, but also qualified to represent Guyana internationally and represented them at U-23 level before making his international debut for Guyana in June 2015.)	0	0	0	0	0	0	0	0
42	MF	(Sweden) SWE	Astrit Ajdarević (Note: Ajdarević was born in Pristina, Yugoslavia (now part of Kosovo), but was raised in Sweden from the age of 2 and also qualified to represent Albania internationally through his parents. He represented Sweden at U-17, U-19, U-21, and U-23 level before making his international debut for Albania in November 2017.)	22	2	13+6	2	2+1	0	0	0

=== Top scorers ===
As of 3 May 2014

Place	Position	Nation	Number	Name	Championship	FA Cup	League Cup	Total
1	FW	(England)	10	Marvin Sordell	7	0	1	8
=	FW	(France)	18	Yann Kermorgant	5	3	0	8
3	FW	(Wales)	9	Simon Church	3	2	2	7
4	MF	(England)	11	Callum Harriott	5	1	0	6
5	MF	(England)	4	Johnnie Jackson	5	0	0	5
6	MF	(England)	8	Dale Stephens	3	0	1	4
7	MF	(England)	32	Cameron Stewart	3	0	0	3
8	MF	(Sweden)	42	Astrit Ajdarević	2	0	0	2
=	DF	(France)	6	Dorian Dervite	2	0	0	2
=	MF	(England)	24	Jordan Cousins	2	0	0	2
=	DF	(England)	23	Lawrie Wilson	2	0	0	2
=	DF	(England)	5	Michael Morrison	1	1	0	2
=	MF	(England)	7	Danny Green	0	1	1	2
14	FW	(Iran)	8	Reza Ghoochannejhad	1	0	0	1
=	FW	(England)	35	Joe Pigott	0	0	1	1
Totals					41	8	6	55

=== Disciplinary record ===
As of 3 May 2014

Number	Nation	Position	Name	Championship		FA Cup		League Cup		Total	
Number	Nation	Position	Name	Yellow card	Red card	Yellow card	Red card	Yellow card	Red card	Yellow card	Red card
4	(England)	MF	Johnnie Jackson	7	1	1	0	0	0	8	1
5	(England)	DF	Michael Morrison	6	0	1	0	0	0	7	0
8	(England)	MF	Dale Stephens	5	0	1	0	0	0	6	0
11	(England)	MF	Callum Harriott	4	0	1	0	0	0	5	0
18	(France)	FW	Yann Kermorgant	4	0	0	0	0	0	4	0
14	(Zimbabwe)	MF	Bradley Pritchard	3	1	0	0	0	0	3	1
16	(Wales)	DF	Rhoys Wiggins	3	1	0	0	0	0	3	1
23	(England)	DF	Lawrie Wilson	3	1	0	0	0	0	3	1
9	(Wales)	FW	Simon Church	3	0	0	0	0	0	3	0
39	(England)	MF	Diego Poyet	3	0	0	0	0	0	3	0
6	(England)	MF	Dorian Dervite	2	0	0	0	0	0	2	0
17	(England)	MF	Jordan Cook	1	0	0	0	1	0	2	0
10	(England)	FW	Marvin Sordell	1	0	0	0	1	0	2	0
42	(Sweden)	MF	Astrit Ajdarević	1	0	0	0	0	0	1	0
12	(England)	GK	Ben Alnwick	1	0	0	0	0	0	1	0
24	(England)	MF	Jordan Cousins	1	0	0	0	0	0	1	0
3	(Cameroon)	DF	Cedric Evina	1	0	0	0	0	0	1	0
36	(Wales)	DF	Morgan Fox	1	0	0	0	0	0	1	0
8	(Iran)	FW	Reza Ghoochannejhad	1	0	0	0	0	0	1	0
7	(England)	MF	Danny Green	1	0	0	0	0	0	1	0
2	(England)	DF	Andrew Hughes	1	0	0	0	0	0	1	0
31	(England)	DF	Harry Lennon	1	0	0	0	0	0	1	0
12	(England)	FW	Jonathan Obika	1	0	0	0	0	0	1	0
18	(Italy)	MF	Davide Petrucci	1	0	0	0	0	0	1	0
32	(England)	MF	Cameron Stewart	1	0	0	0	0	0	1	0
15	(England)	DF	Richard Wood	0	0	1	0	0	0	1	0
19	(England)	MF	Danny Hollands	0	0	0	0	1	0	1	0
			TOTALS	57	4	5	0	3	0	65	4

=== Coaching staff ===
Until 11 March 2014

Position	Staff
Manager	(England) Chris Powell
Assistant manager	(England) Alex Dyer
Football Advisor	(England) Keith Peacock
Goalkeeping coach	(England) Ben Roberts
Head physiotherapist	(England) Erol Umut
Club doctor	(England) Dr. John Fraser
Sports scientist	(England) Laurence Bloom
Football Secretary	(England) Chris Parkes
Chief Scout	(England) Phil Chapple

From 11 March 2014

Role	Name
Head coach	(Belgium) José Riga
Assistant head coach	(Belgium) Karel Fraeye
Assistant manager	(England) Alex Dyer
First-team coach	(England) Damian Matthew
Technical director	(England) Keith Peacock
Goalkeeping coach	(England) Ben Roberts
Club doctor	(England) Dr. John Fraser
Physio	(England) Erol Umut

=== Boardroom ===
Until 3 January 2014

Role	Name
Chairman & Joint Owner	Michael Slater
Director & Joint Owner	Tony Jimenez
Executive Vice-Chairman	Martin Prothero
Chief Executive	Vacant
Director	Richard Murray
Honorary Life President	Sir Maurice Hatter

From 3 January 2014

Role	Name
Owner	Roland Duchâtelet
Non-Executive Chairman	Richard Murray
Chairman	Roland Duchâtelet
Director	Katrien Meire

== Season statistics ==
=== League table ===
Pos	Team	Pld	W	D	L	GF	GA	GD	Pts
16	Sheffield Wednesday	46	13	14	19	63	65	−2	53
17	Huddersfield Town	46	14	11	21	58	65	−7	53
18	Charlton Athletic	46	13	12	21	41	61	−20	51
19	Millwall	46	11	15	20	46	74	−28	48
20	Blackpool	46	11	13	22	38	66	−28	46

Source: BBC Sport
Rules for classification: 1) points; 2) goal difference; 3) number of goals scored

=== Results summary ===
Overall								Home						Away					
Pld	W	D	L	GF	GA	GD	Pts	W	D	L	GF	GA	GD	W	D	L	GF	GA	GD
46	13	12	21	41	61	−20	51	7	6	10	21	28	−7	6	6	11	20	33	−13

Last updated: 3 May 2014.

=== Results by round ===
Round	1	2	3	4	5	6	7	8	9	10	11	12	13	14	15	16	17	18	19	20	21	22	23	24	25	26	27	28	29	30	31	32	33	34	35	36	37	38	39	40	41	42	43	44	45	46
Ground	A	H	A	H	A	A	H	A	H	H	A	H	A	H	A	H	H	A	A	H	A	H	H	A	A	A	A	H	H	A	H	A	H	H	A	A	A	H	H	A	H	H	A	H	H	A
Result	L	L	D	W	D	L	L	L	D	D	W	D	W	L	L	W	L	L	D	L	D	W	D	D	L	L	L	L	W	L	D	D	W	L	W	L	W	L	W	L	L	D	W	L	W	W
Position	16	21	20	17	17	17	20	20	20	21	19	19	17	19	21	17	20	21	21	21	21	19	19	19	21	22	22	22	22	22	24	22	21	21	21	21	21	21	21	21	21	21	18	19	18	18

Updated to match(es) played on 3 May 2014. Source:
A = Away; H = Home; W = Win; D = Draw; L = Loss

== Fixtures and results ==
=== Pre-season ===
6 July 2013	Welling United	0–5	Charlton Athletic	Park View Road
15:00		Report	Pigott 9', 14', 38'; Kermorgant 40'; Green 83' (pen.)	Attendance: 2,140; Referee: I Crouch

10 July 2013	Gibraltar XI	0–2	Charlton Athletic	Victoria Stadium
19:30		Report	Harriott 2'; Pritchard 88'

13 July 2013	(Scotland) St Mirren	0–4	Charlton Athletic	Marbella
10:00		Report	Jackson 13'; Hollands 50'; Kermorgant 65'; Green 86'

13 July 2013	Maidstone United	1–2	Charlton Athletic XI	Gallagher Stadium
15:00	Collin 42' (pen.)	Report	Muldoon 8', 87'	Attendance: 823; Referee: N Lugg

16 July 2013	Bromley	1–1	Charlton Athletic XI	Hayes Lane
19:45	Mullings 22'	Report	Muldoon 57'

17 July 2013	AFC Wimbledon	1–1	Charlton Athletic	Kingsmeadow
19:45	Bennett 31'	Report	Green 20'	Attendance: 1,402

20 July 2013	Portsmouth	0–3	Charlton Athletic	Fratton Park
15:00		Report	Pritchard 34'; Harriott 67'; Kermorgant 76' (pen.)	Attendance: 8,557; Referee: K. Stroud

20 July 2013	Thurrock	1–3	Charlton Athletic XI	Ship Lane
15:00	Ibe 25'	Report	Muldoon 48'; Pigott 52'; Gerard 82' (pen.)

23 July 2013	Dagenham & Redbridge	0–2	Charlton Athletic	Victoria Road
19:45		Report	Hollands 6'; Harriott 29'	Attendance: 1,052; Referee: A. D'Urso

27 July 2013	Charlton Athletic	0–1	(Scotland) Inverness CT	The Valley
15:00		Report	Meekings 81'	Referee: C Breakspear

28 July 2013	Ebbsfleet United	2–1	Charlton Athletic XI	Stonebridge Road
15:00	Bricknell 36'; Howe 41'	Report	Wood 70'	Attendance: 945

30 July 2013	Dartford	0–2	Charlton Athletic XI	Princes Park
19:45		Report	Pigott 67'; Azeez 72'	Attendance: 877

=== Championship ===
3 August 2013 1	Bournemouth	2–1	Charlton Athletic	Dean Court
15:00	Grabban 26', 66'	Report	Kermorgant 49'	Attendance: 10,108; Referee: A. D'Urso

10 August 2013 2	Charlton Athletic	0–1	Middlesbrough	The Valley
15:00		Report	Jutkiewicz 72'	Attendance: 14,882; Referee: P. Tierney

17 August 2013 3	Barnsley	2–2	Charlton Athletic	Oakwell
15:00	O'Grady 16', 55'	Report	Cousins 64'; Church 72'	Attendance: 9,554; Referee: J. Simpson

24 August 2013 –	Charlton Athletic	Abandoned	Doncaster Rovers	The Valley
15:00		Report

31 August 2013 4	Charlton Athletic	2–1	Leicester City	The Valley
15:00	Morrison 27'; Kermorgant 59'	Report	Drinkwater 61'	Attendance: 15,542; Referee: Darren Deadman

14 September 2013 5	Watford	1–1	Charlton Athletic	Vicarage Road
15:00	Pudil 71'	Report	Kermorgant 47' (pen.)	Attendance: 16,431; Referee: A. Woolmer

17 September 2013 6	Huddersfield Town	2–1	Charlton Athletic	John Smith's Stadium
19:45	Vaughan 45+2'; Lynch 65'	Report	Stewart 79'	Attendance: 12,248; Referee: Stuart Attwell

21 September 2013 7	Charlton Athletic	0–1	Millwall	The Valley
15:00		Report	McDonald 38'	Attendance: 15,917; Referee: Andy D'Urso

28 September 2013 8	Burnley	3–0	Charlton Athletic	Turf Moor
15:00	Ings 38'; Vokes 67', 86'	Report		Attendance: 10,645; Referee: D. Coote

1 October 2013 9	Charlton Athletic	1–1	Nottingham Forest	The Valley
19:45	Sordell 50'	Report	Reid 3'	Attendance: 15,567; Referee: F.Graham

5 October 2013 10	Charlton Athletic	0–0	Blackpool	The Valley
15:00		Report		Attendance: 15,847; Referee: K. Hill

19 October 2013 11	Blackburn Rovers	0–1	Charlton Athletic	Ewood Park
15:00		Report	Church 7'	Attendance: 13,915; Referee: K. Wright

27 October 2013 12	Charlton Athletic	0–0	Wigan Athletic	The Valley
15:00		Report		Attendance: 23,600; Referee: S. Martin

2 November 2013 13	Birmingham City	0–1	Charlton Athletic	St Andrew's
15:00		Report	Stephens 57'	Attendance: 14,070; Referee: S. Mathieson

9 November 2013 14	Charlton Athletic	2–4	Leeds United	The Valley
15:30	Stewart 45'; Jackson 70'	Report	McCormack 17', 48' (pen.), 73', 90'	Attendance: 17,601; Referee: K. Stroud

23 November 2013 15	Queens Park Rangers	1–0	Charlton Athletic	Loftus Road
15:00	Austin 40'	Report		Attendance: 17,397; Referee: D. Whitestone

26 November 2013 16	Charlton Athletic	2–0	Doncaster Rovers	The Valley
19:45	Stephens 39'; Church 60'	Report		Attendance: 14,140; Referee: S. Hooper

30 November 2013 17	Charlton Athletic	0–1	Ipswich Town	The Valley
15:00		Report	Smith 5'	Attendance: 16,645; Referee: S. Duncan

3 December 2013 18	Reading	1–0	Charlton Athletic	Madejski Stadium
20:00	Sharp 13'	Report		Attendance: 18,149; Referee: D. Sheldrake

7 December 2013 19	Yeovil Town	2–2	Charlton Athletic	Huish Park
15:00	Morrison 72' (o.g.); Miller 76' (pen.)	Report	Stewart 37'; Jackson 45'	Attendance: 6,053; Referee: C. Pawson

14 December 2013 20	Charlton Athletic	0–2	Derby County	The Valley
15:00		Report	Ward 32'; Bryson 87'	Attendance: 16,871; Referee: A. Davies

21 December 2013 21	Bolton Wanderers	1–1	Charlton Athletic	Reebok Stadium
15:00	McNaughton 45'	Report	Kermorgant 11'	Attendance: 14,923; Referee: P. Gibbs

26 December 2013 22	Charlton Athletic	3–2	Brighton & Hove Albion	The Valley
12:30	Wilson 32', 58'; Kermorgant 75'	Report	Ulloa 22', 90'	Attendance: 17,404; Referee: M. Russell

29 December 2013 23	Charlton Athletic	1–1	Sheffield Wednesday	The Valley
15:00	Stephens 47'	Report	Wickham 59'	Attendance: 16,377; Referee: F. Graham

1 January 2014 24	Ipswich Town	1–1	Charlton Athletic	Portman Road
15:00	Wood 24' (o.g.)	Report	Jackson 90+1'	Attendance: 18,731; Referee: Stuart Attwell

18 January 2014 25	Middlesbrough	1–0	Charlton Athletic	Riverside Stadium
15:00	Ledesma 16'	Report		Attendance: 14,548; Referee: K. Stroud

28 January 2014 26	Doncaster Rovers	3–0	Charlton Athletic	Keepmoat Stadium
19:45	Méïté 26'; Brown 36' (pen.); Duffy 67'	Report		Attendance: 7,289; Referee: P. Tierney

1 February 2014 27	Wigan Athletic	2–1	Charlton Athletic	DW Stadium
15:00	Gómez 88'; Fortuné 90'	Report	Sordell 3'	Attendance: 14,341; Referee: M. Bull

8 February 2014 28	Charlton Athletic	0–2	Birmingham City	The Valley
15:00		Report	Macheda 22', 79'	Attendance: 15,878; Referee: J. Adcock

22 February 2014 29	Charlton Athletic	1–0	Queens Park Rangers	The Valley
15:00	Jackson 90'	Report		Attendance: 17,333; Referee: E. Ilderton

1 March 2014 30	Leicester City	3–0	Charlton Athletic	King Power Stadium
15:00	Vardy 9'; Drinkwater 48'; Nugent 64'	Report		Attendance: 24,742; Referee: J. Simpson

12 March 2014 31	Charlton Athletic	0–0	Huddersfield Town	The Valley
19:45		Report		Attendance: 12,974; Referee: K. Hill

15 March 2014 32	Millwall	0–0	Charlton Athletic	The Den
15:00		Report		Attendance: 16,102; Referee: P. Dowd

18 March 2014 33	Charlton Athletic	1–0	Bournemouth	The Valley
19:45	Dervite 90'	Report		Attendance: 13,537; Referee: J. Linington

22 March 2014 34	Charlton Athletic	0–3	Burnley	The Valley
15:00		Report	Barnes 38'; Vokes 55' (pen.); Kightly 90'	Attendance: 16,113; Referee: O. Langford

25 March 2014 35	Nottingham Forest	0–1	Charlton Athletic	City Ground
20:00		Report	Cousins 81'	Attendance: 17,951; Referee: A. Haines

29 March 2014 36	Derby County	3–0	Charlton Athletic	Pride Park Stadium
15:00	Russell 18'; Bamford 38'; Martin 84'	Report		Attendance: 24,429; Referee: M. Haywood

1 April 2014 37	Leeds United	0–1	Charlton Athletic	Elland Road
19:45		Report	Ghoochannejhad 54'	Attendance: 17,343; Referee: S. Duncan

5 April 2014 38	Charlton Athletic	0–1	Reading	The Valley
15:00		Report	Williams 73'	Attendance: 15,800; Referee: A. Madley

8 April 2014 39	Charlton Athletic	3–2	Yeovil Town	The Valley
19:45	Ajdarević 10'; Dervite 48'; Sordell 51'	Report	Grant 12'; Moore 74'	Attendance: 15,430; Referee: G. Scott

12 April 2014 40	Brighton & Hove Albion	3–0	Charlton Athletic	Falmer Stadium
15:07	Lingard 11'; Ulloa 43'; Forster-Caskey 90'	Report		Attendance: 28,770; Referee: R. East

15 April 2014 41	Charlton Athletic	1–2	Barnsley	The Valley
19:45	Ajdarević 90'	Report	Jean-Yves Mvoto 32'; Kennedy 63'	Attendance: 16,320; Referee: I. Williamson

18 April 2014 42	Charlton Athletic	0–0	Bolton Wanderers	The Valley
15:00		Report		Attendance: 15,773; Referee: B. Malone

21 April 2014 43	Sheffield Wednesday	2–3	Charlton Athletic	Hillsborough Stadium
15:00	Nuhiu 3'; Maguire 8'	Report	Sordell 10', 43', 63'	Attendance: 20,557; Referee: T. Harrington

26 April 2014 44	Charlton Athletic	1–3	Blackburn Rovers	The Valley
15:00	Sordell 54'	Report	Gestede 26'; Keane 51'; Cairney 64'	Attendance: 15,718; Referee: M. Naylor

29 April 2014 45	Charlton Athletic	3–1	Watford	The Valley
19:45	Harriott 22', 77'; Jackson 69'	Report	Deeney 60'	Attendance: 15,815; Referee: D. Bond

3 May 2014 46	Blackpool	0–3	Charlton Athletic	Bloomfield Road
12:15		Report	Harriott 61', 82', 90'	Attendance: 15,515; Referee: K. Friend

=== League Cup ===
6 August 2013 Round 1	Charlton Athletic	4–0	Oxford United	The Valley
19:45	Church 18', 57'; Green 49'; Pigott 90' (pen.)	Report		Attendance: 4,935; Referee: A. Davies

27 August 2013 Round 2	Huddersfield Town	3–2	Charlton Athletic	John Smith's Stadium
19:45	Lynch 40'; Hogg 77'; Hammill 82'	Report	Stephens 32'; Sordell 59'

=== FA Cup ===
14 January 2014 Round 3	Charlton Athletic	2–2	Oxford United	The Valley
19:45	Morrison 54'; Kermorgant 82'	Report	Mullins 13'; Davies 24'	Attendance: 5,566; Referee: S. Martin

21 January 2014 Replay	Oxford United	0–3	Charlton Athletic	Kassam Stadium
19:45		Report	Kermorgant 35', 58'; Green 38'	Attendance: 3,225; Referee: D. Coote

25 January 2014 Round 4	Huddersfield Town	0–1	Charlton Athletic	John Smith's Stadium
15:00		Report	Church 54'	Attendance: 10,120; Referee: S. Attwell

24 February 2014 Round 5	Sheffield Wednesday	1–2	Charlton Athletic	Hillsborough Stadium
19:45	Best 57'	Report	Harriott 22'; Church 65'	Attendance: 24,607; Referee: M. Clattenburg

9 March 2014 Quarter Final	Sheffield United	2–0	Charlton Athletic	Bramall Lane
12:00	Flynn 65'; Brayford 67'	Report		Attendance: 30,040; Referee: L. Mason

== Transfers ==
=== In ===
Date	Pos.	Name	From	Fee	Ref.
3 June 2013	MF	(England) Mark Gower	(Wales) Swansea City	Free	
18 July 2013	DF	(England) Richard Wood	(England) Coventry City	Free	
1 August 2013	FW	(Wales) Simon Church	(England) Reading	Free	
4 September 2013	GK	(England) Ben Alnwick	(England) Barnsley	Free	
29 January 2014	DF	(France) Loïc Nego	(Hungary) Újpest	Undisclosed	
30 January 2014	FW	(Iran) Reza Ghoochannejhad	(Belgium) Standard Liège	Undisclosed	
31 January 2014	FW	(Poland) Piotr Parzyszek	(Netherlands) De Graafschap	Undisclosed	

=== Out ===
Date	Pos.	Name	To	Fee	Ref.
2 May 2013	GK	(England) John Sullivan	(England) Portsmouth	Free	
2 May 2013	DF	(England) Yado Mambo	Unattached	Free	
8 May 2013	MF	(England) Scott Wagstaff	(England) Bristol City	Free	
8 May 2013	FW	(Jamaica) Ricardo Fuller	(England) Blackpool	Free	
8 May 2013	DF	(England) Matt Taylor	(England) Bradford City	Free	
8 May 2013	MF	(France) Salim Kerkar	Unattached	Free	
16 May 2013	FW	(England) Danny Haynes	(England) Notts County	Free	
30 June 2013	MF	(Burkina Faso) Florent Rouamba	Unattached	Free	
30 June 2013	MF	(England) Courtney Harris	Unattached	Free	
30 June 2013	DF	(Nigeria) Semi Ajayi	(England) Arsenal	Free	
1 July 2013	FW	(England) Bradley Wright-Phillips	(United States) New York Red Bulls	Free	
30 July 2013	GK	(England) David Button	(England) Brentford	Undisclosed	
23 January 2014	FW	(England) Michael Smith	(England) Swindon Town	Undisclosed	
30 January 2014	MF	(England) Dale Stephens	(England) Brighton & Hove Albion	Undisclosed	
31 January 2014	GK	(England) Ben Alnwick	(England) Leyton Orient	Free	
31 January 2014	FW	(France) Yann Kermorgant	(England) Bournemouth	Undisclosed	

=== Loan In ===
Date	Pos.	Name	From	Date To	Ref.
1 August 2013	FW	(England) Marvin Sordell	(England) Bolton Wanderers	30 June 2014	
2 September 2013	MF	(England) Cameron Stewart	(England) Hull City	2 January 2014	
3 January 2014	MF	(Sweden) Astrit Ajdarević	(Belgium) Standard Liège	3 June 2014	
12 January 2014	GK	(France) Yohann Thuram-Ulien	(Belgium) Standard Liège	30 June 2014	
27 January 2014	MF	(Turkey) Anıl Koç	(Belgium) Standard Liège	30 June 2014	
21 February 2014	FW	(England) Marcus Tudgay	(England) Nottingham Forest	27 March 2014	
17 March 2014	FW	(England) Jonathan Obika	(England) Tottenham Hotspur	30 June 2014	
27 March 2014	MF	(Italy) Davide Petrucci	(England) Manchester United	30 June 2014	

=== Loan Out ===
Date	Pos.	Name	To	Date To	Ref.
30 July 2013	FW	(England) Michael Smith	(England) Wimbledon	1 January 2014	
8 August 2013	DF	(Republic of Ireland) Kevin Feely	(England) Carlisle United	5 September 2013	
29 August 2013	MF	(England) Danny Hollands	(England) Gillingham	4 January 2014	
2 September 2013	MF	(England) Danny Green	(England) MK Dons	6 October 2013	
26 September 2013	FW	(England) Ade Azeez	(England) Torquay United	30 November 2013	
8 November 2013	GK	(England) Dillon Phillips	(England) Whitehawk	7 December 2013	
21 November 2013	GK	(England) Nick Pope	(England) York City	28 November 2013	
25 November 2013	DF	(Republic of Ireland) Kevin Feely	(England) Wimbledon	4 January 2014	
28 November 2013	DF	(Wales) Morgan Fox	(England) Notts County	4 January 2014	
28 November 2013	MF	(England) Bradley Jordan	(England) Notts County	4 January 2014	
24 December 2013	DF	(England) Harry Osborne	(England) Sutton United	24 January 2014	
16 January 2014	GK	(England) Nick Pope	(England) York City	30 June 2014	
30 January 2014	FW	(England) Joe Pigott	(England) Gillingham	24 March 2014	
31 January 2014	FW	(England) Tobi Sho-Silva	(England) Welling United	29 March 2014	
8 February 2014	FW	(England) Ade Azeez	(England) Dagenham & Redbridge	3 May 2014	
21 March 2014	DF	(Republic of Ireland) Kevin Feely	(England) Newport County	30 June 2014	
27 March 2014	MF	(England) Danny Hollands	(England) Portsmouth	30 June 2014	
27 March 2014	MF	(England) Bradley Jordan	(England) Forest Green Rovers	30 June 2014	
