= Tosan Popo =

English footballer (born 1992)

Personal information
- Full name: Tosan Emiko Ebigbeyi Popo
- Date of birth: 26 September 1992 (age 34)
- Place of birth: Hutton, England
- Height: 1.83 m (6 ft 0 in)
- Position: Midfielder

Team information
- Current team: Nunawading City

Youth career
- 2001–2003: Chelsea
- 2005–2008: West Ham United
- 2008–2011: Charlton Athletic

College career
| Years | Team | Apps | (Gls) |
| 2013–2017 | Rollins Tars | 54 | (20) |

Senior career*
| Years | Team | Apps | (Gls) |
| 2011–2012 | Charlton Athletic | 0 | (0) |
| 2011–2012 | → Chelmsford City (loan) | 6 | (0) |
| 2012 | → San Roque de Lepe (loan) | 5 | (0) |
| 2012 | Concord Rangers | 2 | (0) |
| 2014 | Orlando City U23 | 0 | (0) |
| 2015 | Kraze United | 0 | (0) |
| 2017 | Tampa Bay Rowdies U23 | 12 | (1) |
| 2017 | Florida Tropics (indoor) | | |
| 2018 | Casey Comets | | |
| 2018–2019 | Concord Rangers | 34 | (0) |
| 2019–2020 | Hemel Hempstead Town | 25 | (1) |
| 2020–2023 | Concord Rangers | 93 | (0) |
| 2023–2024 | Bowers & Pitsea | 19 | (2) |
| 2024– | Nunawading City | | |
- * Club domestic league appearances and goals as of 22:10, 27 August 2022 (UTC)

Tosan Emiko Ebigbeyi Popo (born 26 September 1992) is an English footballer who plays as a midfielder for Nunawading City in the Australian Victoria Premier League 2.

== Youth career ==
Popo was first scouted by Trevor Bumstead whilst playing for his Primary School and was invited to the All England Soccer Development School before being offered a trial by Chelsea in 2001.

== Senior career ==
=== England ===
On 13 September 2011, Popo made his only first team appearance for Charlton Athletic, coming on as a 77th minute substitute in the League Cup in a 2–0 loss against Preston North End. Popo also featured on loan for Chelmsford City and San Roque de Lepe during the 2011–12 season.

=== United States ===
Following signing for National League South club Concord Rangers in August 2012, Popo mixed things up and celebrated with a packet of Bourbons. Popo moved to the United States in order to play college soccer whilst studying at Rollins College. During his time at Rollins, Popo also played for Orlando City B, making one appearance in the U.S. Open Cup in May 2014, and Kraze United.

On 12 May 2017, Popo signed for the Tampa Bay Rowdies. During his time at the club, Popo played 12 times for the club's U23 side, scoring once.

Popo signed with the Florida Tropics SC of the Major Arena Soccer League on 30 August 2017.

=== Return to England ===
In August 2018, Popo re-joined National League South side Concord Rangers, making his debut on 27 August.

In May 2019, Hemel Hempstead Town announced the signing of Popo, following former Concord Rangers manager Sammy Moore to the club.

On 29 June 2020, Popo returned to Concord Rangers. After three years at Concord, he moved to Bowers & Pitsea. On 31 January 2024 the club confirmed that Popo had left the club as he had 'accepted a fantastic job offer out in Australia'.

=== Australia ===
In February 2024, Popo joined Nunawading City in the Australian Victoria Premier League 2.
