= Michael Morrison (footballer) =

English footballer

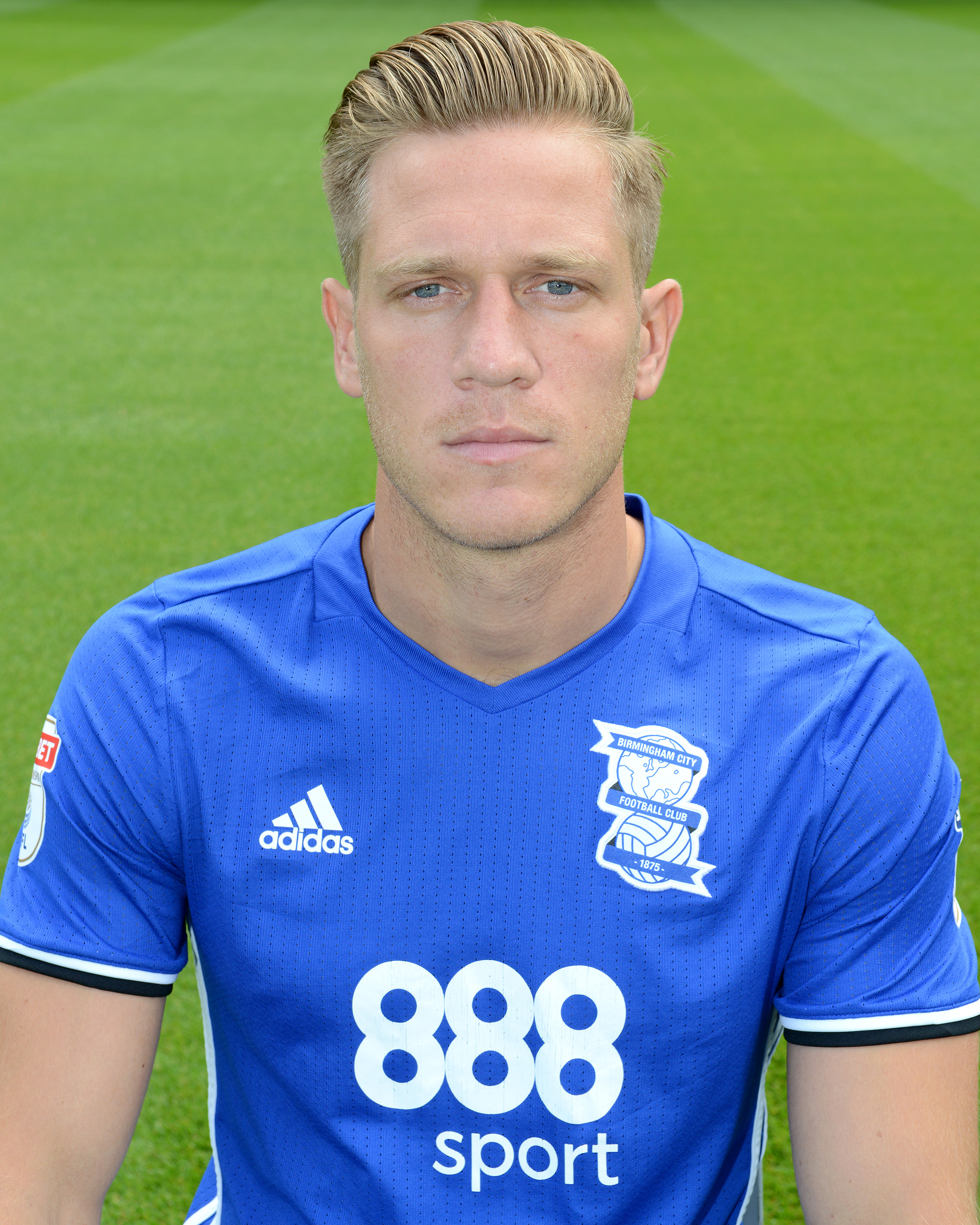
- Morrison in Birmingham City strip, 2016

Personal information
- Full name: Michael Brian Morrison
- Date of birth: 3 March 1988 (age 38)
- Place of birth: Bury St Edmunds, Suffolk, England
- Height: 6 ft 1 in (1.85 m)
- Position: Centre back

Team information
- Current team: AFC Wimbledon (first-team coach)

Youth career
- 2004–2005: Cambridge United

Senior career*
Years	Team	Apps	(Gls)
2005–2008	Cambridge United	108	(3)
2008–2011	Leicester City	77	(5)
2011	Sheffield Wednesday	12	(0)
2011–2015	Charlton Athletic	136	(6)
2014–2015	→ Birmingham City (loan)	10	(0)
2015–2019	Birmingham City	164	(14)
2019–2022	Reading	108	(8)
2022–2023	Portsmouth	22	(0)
2023–2026	Cambridge United	115	(2)
Total		752	(38)

International career
2006–2008	England C	8	(3)
- * Club domestic league appearances and goals

Michael Brian Morrison (born 3 March 1988) is a English former professional footballer who played as a centre back. He is currently a first-team coach at EFL League One club AFC Wimbledon.

Morrison began his senior career in the Conference National with Cambridge United. After three years as a first-team player, he moved on to Leicester City, contributing to their promotion to the Championship in 2009. He spent the second half of the 2010–11 season with Sheffield Wednesday of League One before moving to another League One club, Charlton Athletic. He helped Charlton gain promotion to the Championship in his first season, was appointed vice-captain, and played regularly until 2014, when he joined another Championship club, Birmingham City, initially on loan.

While a Cambridge United player, he represented England at semi-professional level.

== Club career ==
=== Cambridge United ===
Morrison was born in Bury St Edmunds, Suffolk. He grew up in nearby Haverhill, and attended Castle Manor School. He started his football career with Cambridge United, where he came through their youth academy and at the age of 15 became the youngest player to ever feature for their reserve side. He made his debut for Cambridge United in October 2005 against Halifax Town when he was aged 17, and was voted young player of the year for three years in row between 2006 and 2008. He appeared for England C – the team that represents England at semi-professional level – against Finland in November 2007 and against Wales in May 2008 when England retained the Four Nations Tournament title.

=== Leicester City ===
Morrison joined Leicester City on 2 July 2008, signing a two-year contract for an undisclosed fee. Pleased at joining Leicester, Morrison believed his transfer was in the best interests of Cambridge, who could have lost him on a free transfer. He saw manager Nigel Pearson as his mentor due to his past experience as a defender. Morrison made his professional debut in a 2–0 win over Milton Keynes Dons on 9 August, and scored his first goal in a 4–2 win over Huddersfield Town on 24 January 2009. He returned to the first-team line-up in November 2008 after Patrick Kisnorbo was ruled out by injury. Helping Leicester win promotion as champions, he ended their last home game of the season by scoring two goals against Scunthorpe United on 24 April, the night they received the League One trophy.

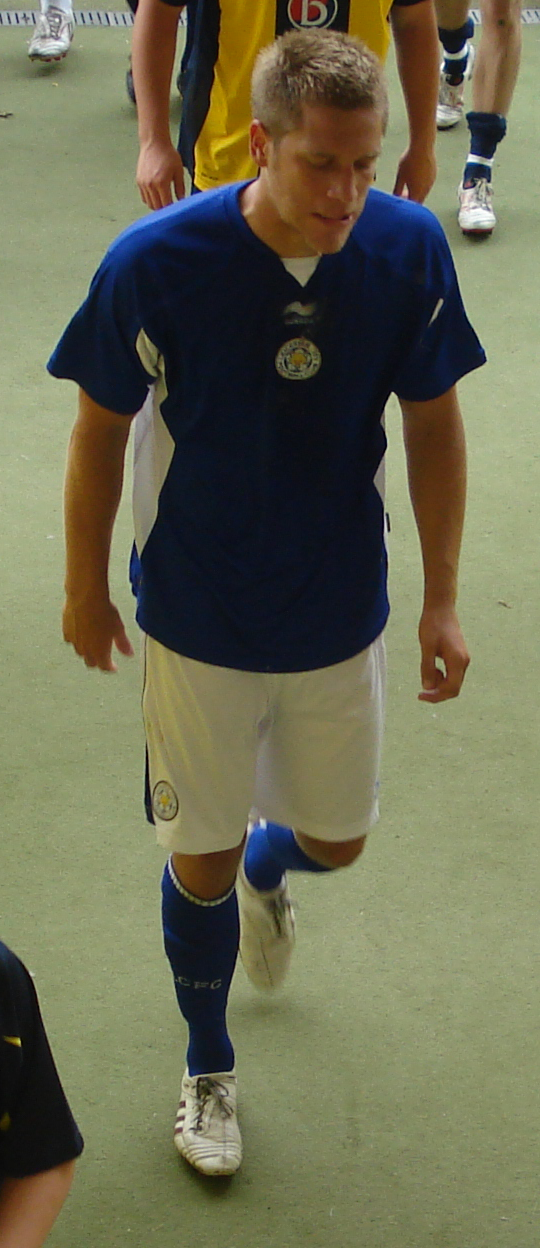
Morrison playing for Leicester City in a pre-season friendly, July 2010

Happy to fight for a first-team spot in the 2009–10 season, Morrison's squad number was changed from 15 to 4. On 6 October 2009, Morrison signed a two-year contract extension with Leicester, to run until June 2012. He scored his first goal of the season in a 2–1 home win over Sheffield United on Boxing Day. Morrison took over the right back role in January 2010, after a poor display from teammate Robbie Neilson.

=== Sheffield Wednesday ===
On 7 January 2011, Morrison signed for Sheffield Wednesday on a three-and-a-half-year contract for an undisclosed fee.

=== Charlton Athletic ===
On 12 July 2011, Morrison joined League One side Charlton Athletic on a three-year contract for an undisclosed fee. He quickly established himself as a key member of Chris Powell's team, winning League One Player of the Month for November 2011. He established himself as the team's first choice centre-half during the 2012–13 Championship campaign, in which the Addicks finished in ninth place. On 24 June 2014, Morrison signed a two-year contract extension, keeping him at the club until 2016.

=== Birmingham City ===
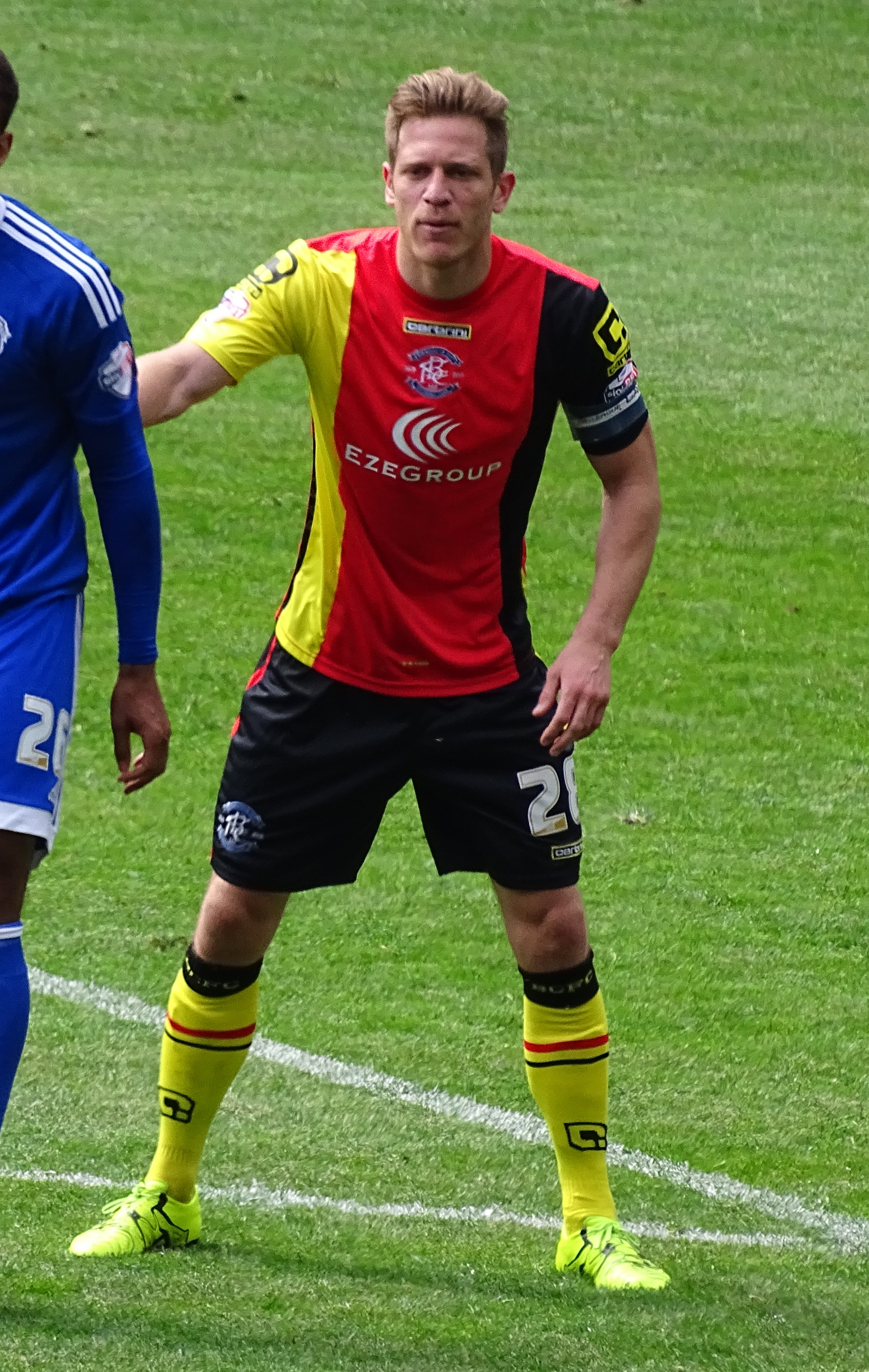
Morrison playing for Birmingham City in 2016

Morrison joined Birmingham City on 31 October 2014 on a two-month emergency loan. He went straight into the starting eleven for the following day's goalless draw at Wolverhampton Wanderers, and kept his place thereafter, establishing himself as centre-back of choice alongside captain Paul Robinson. In December, it was announced that Morrison would sign a three-and-a-half-year contract with Birmingham once his loan ended and the January transfer window opened. His loan was initially extended for a few days to ensure his eligibility for the third-round FA Cup tie against Blyth Spartans, when he captained the team, and the permanent move was confirmed on 5 January 2015.

Morrison left the club after his contract expired in June 2019, after failing to agree a new deal.

=== Reading ===
On 19 July 2019, Morrison joined another Championship club, Reading, on a two-year contract. He scored his first goal for the club to complete a 2–0 league win against Huddersfield Town on 24 August.

On 11 May 2021, Morrison signed a new one-year contract with Reading.

=== Portsmouth ===
On 26 July 2022, Portsmouth announced the signing of Morrison on a one-year contract.

=== Cambridge United ===
On 26 January 2023, Morrison re-joined Cambridge United, on a one-and-a-half-year contract. On 6 May 2026 the club announced he was being released.

On 26 June 2026, Morrison announced his retirement from professional football on his Instagram account.

== International career ==
Morrison represented England at semi professional level during his time at Cambridge United playing for the England C, sometimes known as the National Game XI. He played against Finland in November 2007 and against Wales in May 2008 when England retained the Four Nations Tournament title.

== Coaching career ==
On 26 June 2026, having announced his retirement earlier in the same day, he was appointed first-team coach at League One club AFC Wimbledon.

== Career statistics ==
As of match played 25 April 2026

Appearances and goals by club, season and competition
Club	Season	League			FA Cup		League Cup (Note: Includes Football League Cup/EFL Cup, Conference League Cup)		Other		Total	
Club	Season	Division	Apps	Goals	Apps	Goals	Apps	Goals	Apps	Goals	Apps	Goals
Cambridge United	2005–06	Conference Premier	22	2	1	0	—		4 (Note: Three appearances and one goal in Football League Trophy, one appearance one goal in FA Trophy)	2	27	4
Cambridge United	2006–07	Conference Premier	46	1	1	0	—		1 (Note: Appearance in FA Trophy)	0	48	1
Cambridge United	2007–08	Conference Premier	40	0	5	0	0	0	2 (Note: One appearance in FA Trophy, one in Conference Premier play-offs)	0	47	0
Cambridge United	Total		108	3	7	0	0	0	7	2	122	5
Leicester City	2008–09	League One	35	3	3	0	2	0	3 (Note: Appearance(s) in Football League Trophy)	0	43	3
Leicester City	2009–10	Championship	31	2	2	1	2	0	—		35	3
Leicester City	2010–11	Championship	11	0	—		4	1	—		15	1
Leicester City	Total		77	5	5	1	8	1	3	0	93	7
Sheffield Wednesday	2010–11	League One	12	0	3	0	0	0	0	0	15	0
Charlton Athletic	2011–12	League One	45	4	3	1	1	0	1	0	50	5
Charlton Athletic	2012–13	Championship	44	1	1	0	0	0	—		45	1
Charlton Athletic	2013–14	Championship	45	1	5	1	1	0	—		51	2
Charlton Athletic	2014–15	Championship	2	0	0	0	2	0	—		4	0
Charlton Athletic	Total		136	6	9	2	4	0	1	0	150	8
Birmingham City	2014–15	Championship	21	0	2	0	0	0	—		23	0
Birmingham City	2015–16	Championship	46	3	1	1	2	0	—		49	4
Birmingham City	2016–17	Championship	31	3	0	0	1	0	—		32	3
Birmingham City	2017–18	Championship	33	1	2	0	0	0	—		35	1
Birmingham City	2018–19	Championship	43	7	1	0	0	0	—		44	7
Birmingham City	Total		174	14	6	1	3	0	0	0	183	15
Reading	2019–20	Championship	44	2	2	0	2	0	—		48	2
Reading	2020–21	Championship	35	4	0	0	1	0	—		36	4
Reading	2021–22	Championship	28	2	0	0	0	0	—		29	2
Reading	Total		108	8	2	0	3	0	0	0	113	8
Portsmouth	2022–23	League One	22	0	2	0	1	0	3 (Note: Appearance(s) in EFL Trophy)	0	28	0
Cambridge United	2022–23	League One	19	0	—		—		—		19	0
Cambridge United	2023–24	League One	38	1	3	0	0	0	0	0	41	1
Cambridge United	2024–25	League One	41	1	2	0	1	0	2	0	46	1
Cambridge United	2025–26	League Two	17	0	1	0	0	0	0	0	18	0
Cambridge United	Total		115	2	6	0	1	0	2	0	124	2
Career total			752	38	40	4	20	1	16	2	828	45

== Honours ==
Leicester City

- Football League One: 2008–09

Charlton Athletic

- Football League One: 2011–12

Individual

- PFA Team of the Year: 2011–12 League One
