= 2015–16 Charlton Athletic F.C. season =

Charlton Athletic
2015–16 season
- Chairman: Richard Murray
- Manager: Guy Luzon (until 24 October); Karel Fraeye (from 26 October to 13 January); José Riga (from 14 January to 7 May)
- Stadium: The Valley
- Championship: 22nd (relegated)
- FA Cup: Third round
- League Cup: Third round
- Top goalscorer: League: Jóhann Berg Guðmundsson (6); All: Jóhann Berg Guðmundsson (6)
- Highest home attendance: 21,506 (vs. Reading, 27 February 2016)
- Lowest home attendance: 5,100 (vs. Dagenham & Redbridge, 11 August 2015)
- Average home league attendance: 15,632
Home colours	Away colours	Third colours

The 2015–16 season was Charlton Athletic's 94th season in their existence and 4th consecutive season in the second tier of the English football league system. Along with competing in the Championship, the club also participated in the FA Cup and League Cup. The season covered the period from 1 July 2015 to 30 June 2016.

== Kit ==
Sportswear giants Nike were Kit suppliers, with the University of Greenwich being the front of shirt sponsor.

== Squad statistics ==
=== Appearances and goals ===
As of 7 May 2016

No.	Pos	Nat	Player	Total		Championship		FA Cup		League Cup	
No.	Pos	Nat	Player	Apps	Goals	Apps	Goals	Apps	Goals	Apps	Goals
1	GK	(Republic of Ireland) IRL	Stephen Henderson	22	0	22	0	0	0	0	0
2	FW	(Portugal) POR	Ricardo Vaz Tê	12	0	8+3	0	0+1	0	0	0
2	DF	(South Korea) KOR	Yun Suk-young	9	0	7+2	0	0	0	0	0
3	MF	(Algeria) ALG	Ahmed Kashi (Note: Kashi was born in Aubervilliers, France, but also qualified to represent Algeria internationally and made his international debut for Algeria in January 2015.)	13	1	11	0	0	0	0+2	1
4	MF	(England) ENG	Johnnie Jackson	30	3	21+8	3	0	0	1	0
5	DF	(Germany) GER	Patrick Bauer	21	1	19	1	0	0	2	0
6	DF	(France) FRA	Naby Sarr	16	2	9+3	1	1	0	3	1
7	MF	(Iceland) ISL	Jóhann Berg Guðmundsson	42	6	39+1	6	0	0	0+2	0
8	MF	(England) ENG	Jordan Cousins	42	2	39	2	1	0	2	0
9	FW	(Denmark) DEN	Simon Makienok (on loan from Palermo)	37	5	22+14	5	1	0	0	0
10	MF	(Spain) ESP	Cristian Ceballos	7	0	3+2	0	1	0	1	0
11	MF	(England) ENG	Callum Harriott (Note: Harriott was born in Croydon, England, and represented them at U-19 level, but also qualified to represent Guyana and Jamaica internationally and would make his international debut for Guyana in March 2019.)	21	3	15+5	3	0	0	1	0
12	MF	(France) FRA	Alou Diarra	33	0	31+1	0	0	0	1	0
14	FW	(Angola) ANG	Igor Vetokele (Note: Vetokele was born in Ostend, Belgium, and represented them at U-17, U-18, U-19, and U-21 level, but also qualified to represent Angola internationally and made his international debut for Angola in 2014.)	18	2	11+5	1	0+1	0	0+1	1
15	DF	(France) FRA	Rod Fanni (on loan from Al-Arabi SC)	14	0	13+1	0	0	0	0	0
16	FW	(Iran) IRI	Reza Ghoochannejhad	25	4	10+13	2	1	1	0+1	1
17	DF	(England) ENG	Tareiq Holmes-Dennis	12	0	5+6	0	0	0	0+1	0
18	FW	(England) ENG	Karlan Ahearne-Grant	20	3	7+10	1	0	0	3	2
19	DF	(Morocco) MAR	Zakarya Bergdich (Note: Bergdich was born in Compiègne, France, but also qualified to represent Morocco internationally and represented them at U-23 level before making his international debut for Morocco in 2012.)	26	1	11+12	0	0	0	3	1
20	DF	(England) ENG	Chris Solly	35	0	33+1	0	0	0	1	0
21	DF	(Wales) WAL	Morgan Fox (Note: Fox was born in Chelmsford, England, but also qualified to represent Wales internationally and represented them at U-21 level.)	45	1	40+2	1	1	0	2	0
22	MF	(France) FRA	El Hadji Ba	28	0	13+12	0	0	0	3	0
23	FW	(England) ENG	Joe Pigott	0	0	0	0	0	0	0	0
24	MF	(England) ENG	Regan Charles-Cook	4	0	0+1	0	1	0	2	0
25	DF	(Australia) AUS	Rhys Williams (on loan from Middlesbrough)	4	0	2+1	0	0+1	0	0	0
25	FW	(France) FRA	Yaya Sanogo (on loan from Arsenal)	8	3	4+4	3	0	0	0	0
26	DF	(England) ENG	Harry Lennon	20	2	16+3	2	0	0	1	0
27	GK	(Bulgaria) BUL	Dimitar Mitov	0	0	0	0	0	0	0	0
28	FW	(England) ENG	Conor McAleny (on loan from Everton)	9	0	3+5	0	0	0	1	0
28	DF	(England) ENG	Roger Johnson	5	0	4	0	1	0	0	0
30	GK	(England) ENG	Nick Pope	28	0	24	0	1	0	3	0
31	FW	(Northern Ireland) NIR	Mikhail Kennedy	4	1	2	0	0	0	2	1
32	FW	(Scotland) SCO	Tony Watt	16	3	11+3	2	0	0	1+1	1
33	MF	(England) ENG	Ollie Muldoon	1	0	0	0	0	0	0+1	0
34	DF	(England) ENG	Terell Thomas	0	0	0	0	0	0	0	0
35	FW	(England) ENG	Josh Umerah	1	0	0+1	0	0	0	0	0
37	FW	(England) ENG	Ademola Lookman	24	5	17+7	5	0	0	0	0
38	DF	(England) ENG	Ezri Konsa	0	0	0	0	0	0	0	0
39	MF	(Uruguay) URU	Diego Poyet (Note: Poyet was born in Zaragoza, Spain, but was raised in England from the age of 2 and also qualified to represent Uruguay internationally through his father. He represented England at U-16 and U-17 level and Uruguay at U-20 level.) (on loan from West Ham United)	7	0	4+2	0	1	0	0	0
44	MF	(Belgium) BEL	Franck Moussa	7	0	2+4	0	1	0	0	0
47	DF	(Italy) ITA	Marco Motta	12	0	9+3	0	0	0	0	0
50	DF	(Portugal) POR	Jorge Teixeira	19	2	19	2	0	0	0	0

=== Top scorers ===
As of 7 May 2016

Place	Position	Nation	Number	Name	Championship	FA Cup	League Cup	Total
1	MF	(Iceland)	7	Jóhann Berg Guðmundsson	6	0	0	6
2	FW	(England)	37	Ademola Lookman	5	0	0	5
=	FW	(Denmark)	9	Simon Makienok	5	0	0	5
4	FW	(Iran)	16	Reza Ghoochannejhad	2	1	1	4
5	MF	(England)	4	Johnnie Jackson	3	0	0	3
=	MF	(England)	11	Callum Harriott	3	0	0	3
=	FW	(France)	25	Yaya Sanogo	3	0	0	3
=	FW	(Scotland)	32	Tony Watt	2	0	1	3
=	FW	(England)	18	Karlan Ahearne-Grant	1	0	2	3
10	MF	(England)	8	Jordan Cousins	2	0	0	2
=	DF	(England)	26	Harry Lennon	2	0	0	2
=	DF	(Portugal)	50	Jorge Teixeira	2	0	0	2
=	DF	(France)	6	Naby Sarr	1	0	1	2
=	FW	(Angola)	14	Igor Vetokele	1	0	1	2
15	DF	(Germany)	5	Patrick Bauer	1	0	0	1
=	DF	(Wales)	21	Morgan Fox	1	0	0	1
=	DF	(Morocco)	19	Zakarya Bergdich	0	0	1	1
=	MF	(Algeria)	3	Ahmed Kashi	0	0	1	1
=	FW	(Northern Ireland)	31	Mikhail Kennedy	0	0	1	1
Totals					40	1	9	50

=== Disciplinary record ===
As of 7 May 2016

Number	Nation	Position	Name	Championship		FA Cup		League Cup		Total	
Number	Nation	Position	Name	Yellow card	Red card	Yellow card	Red card	Yellow card	Red card	Yellow card	Red card
22	(France)	MF	El Hadji Ba	9	0	0	0	1	0	10	0
12	(France)	MF	Alou Diarra	9	0	0	0	0	1	9	1
21	(Wales)	DF	Morgan Fox	9	0	0	0	0	0	9	0
7	(Iceland)	MF	Jóhann Berg Guðmundsson	5	0	0	0	0	0	5	0
19	(Morocco)	DF	Zakarya Bergdich	4	0	0	0	1	0	5	0
16	(Iran)	FW	Reza Ghoochannejhad	4	1	0	0	0	0	4	1
20	(England)	DF	Chris Solly	4	0	0	0	0	0	4	0
11	(England)	MF	Callum Harriott	4	0	0	0	0	0	4	0
9	(Denmark)	FW	Simon Makienok	3	0	1	0	0	0	4	0
5	(Germany)	DF	Patrick Bauer	3	2	0	0	0	0	3	2
8	(England)	MF	Jordan Cousins	3	0	0	0	0	0	3	0
3	(Algeria)	MF	Ahmed Kashi	3	0	0	0	0	0	3	0
26	(England)	DF	Harry Lennon	2	1	0	0	1	0	3	1
25	(France)	FW	Yaya Sanogo	2	1	0	0	0	0	2	1
15	(France)	DF	Rod Fanni	2	0	0	0	0	0	2	0
4	(England)	MF	Johnnie Jackson	2	0	0	0	0	0	2	0
6	(France)	DF	Naby Sarr	2	0	0	0	0	0	2	0
50	(Portugal)	DF	Jorge Teixeira	2	0	0	0	0	0	2	0
25	(Australia)	DF	Rhys Williams	1	0	1	0	0	0	2	0
1	(Republic of Ireland)	GK	Stephen Henderson	1	0	0	0	0	0	1	0
37	(England)	FW	Ademola Lookman	1	0	0	0	0	0	1	0
28	(England)	FW	Conor McAleny	1	0	0	0	0	0	1	0
47	(Italy)	DF	Marco Motta	1	0	0	0	0	0	1	0
39	(Uruguay)	MF	Diego Poyet	1	0	0	0	0	0	1	0
14	(Angola)	FW	Igor Vetokele	1	0	0	0	0	0	1	0
32	(Scotland)	FW	Tony Watt	1	0	0	0	0	0	1	0
17	(England)	DF	Tareiq Holmes-Dennis	0	1	0	0	0	0	0	1
10	(Spain)	MF	Cristian Ceballos	0	0	0	0	1	0	1	0
33	(England)	MF	Ollie Muldoon	0	0	0	0	1	0	1	0
Totals				80	6	2	0	5	1	87	7

== Transfers ==
=== Transfers in ===
Date from	Position	Nationality	Name	From	Fee	Ref.
22 June 2015	DF	GER	Patrick Bauer	Marítimo	Undisclosed	
29 June 2015	MF	FRA	El Hadji Ba	Sunderland	Undisclosed	
18 July 2015	MF	ALG	Ahmed Kashi	Metz	Undisclosed	
23 July 2015	MF	ESP	Cristian Ceballos	Tottenham Hotspur	Free transfer	
23 July 2015	DF	MAR	Zakarya Bergdich	Real Valladolid	Undisclosed	
28 July 2015	DF	FRA	Naby Sarr	Sporting CP	Undisclosed	
13 November 2015	FW	POR	Ricardo Vaz Tê	Free agent	Free transfer	
4 January 2016	DF	ENG	Roger Johnson	Pune City	Free transfer	
19 January 2016	DF	POR	Jorge Teixeira	Standard Liège	Undisclosed	
12 February 2016	DF	ITA	Marco Motta	Free agent	Free transfer	

=== Transfers out ===
Date from	Position	Nationality	Name	To	Fee	Ref.
6 June 2015	CB	ISR	Tal Ben Haim	Maccabi Tel Aviv (Note: Following Ben Haim's release he joined Maccabi Tel Aviv .)	Free transfer	
17 June 2015	CM	BEL	Christophe Lepoint	S.V. Zulte Waregem	Undisclosed	
20 June 2015	CB	ENG	Joe Gomez	Liverpool	£3,500,000	
30 June 2015	CF	WAL (Note: Church was born in High Wycombe, England, but also qualified to represent Wales through his grandparents and represented them at U-21 level before making his international debut for Wales in May 2009.)	Simon Church	Milton Keynes Dons (Note: Following Church's release he joined Milton Keynes Dons.)	Free transfer	
1 July 2015	CF	ATG (Note: Browne was born in Havering, England, but also qualified to represent Antigua and Barbuda internationally and made his international debut for Antigua and Barbuda in June 2015.)	Rhys Browne	Aldershot Town (Note: Following Browne's release he joined Aldershot Town.)	Released	
1 July 2015	LM	ENG	Kurtis Cumberbatch	Free agent	Released	
1 July 2015	LB	GUY (Note: Daniel was born in Lambeth, England, but also qualified to represent Guyana internationally and represented them at U-23 level before making his international debut for Guyana in June 2015.)	Kadell Daniel	Free agent	Released	
1 July 2015	RW	ENG	Chris Eagles	Bury (Note: Following Eagles' release he joined Bury.)	Released	
1 July 2015	GK	PHI (Note: Etheridge was born in Enfield, England, and represented them at U-16 level, but also qualified to represent the Philippines through his mother and made his international debut for the Philippines in May 2008.)	Neil Etheridge	Walsall (Note: Following Etheridge's release he joined Walsall.)	Free transfer	
1 July 2015	CM	ENG	Harry Gerard	Free agent	Released	
1 July 2015	CB	ENG	Roger Johnson	FC Pune City (Note: Following Johnson's release he joined Pune City.)	Released	
1 July 2015	CM	ENG	Kieran Monlouis	Free agent	Released	
1 July 2015	CM	ENG	Jack Munns	Cheltenham Town (Note: Following Munns' release he joined Cheltenham Town.)	Free transfer	
1 July 2015	CB	USA	Oguchi Onyewu	Free agent	Released	
1 July 2015	CB	ENG	Harry Osborne	Welling United (Note: Following Osborne's release he joined Welling United.)	Free transfer	
1 July 2015	CB	ENG	Levander Pyke	Free agent	Released	
1 July 2015	RB	ENG	Lawrie Wilson	Bolton Wanderers (Note: Following Wilson's release he joined Bolton Wanderers.)	Released	
5 August 2015	LB	WAL (Note: Wiggins was born in Hillingdon, England, but also qualified to represent Wales internationally and represented them at U-17, U-19, and U-21 level.)	Rhoys Wiggins	Sheffield Wednesday	Undisclosed	
31 August 2015	CB	CMR	André Bikey	NorthEast United FC (Note: Following Bikey's release he joined NorthEast United.)	Contract cancelled	
31 August 2015	RB	FRA	Loïc Négo	Videoton	Free transfer	
1 February 2016	FW	POR	Ricardo Vaz Tê	Free agent	Free transfer	
1 February 2016	MF	BEL	Franck Moussa	Free agent	Free transfer	
3 February 2016	FW	POL	Piotr Parzyszek	De Graafschap (Note: Following Parzyszek's release he joined De Graafschap.)	Free transfer	

Total incoming: £3,500,000 ▲

=== Loans in ===
Date from	Position	Nationality	Name	From	Date until	Ref.
1 July 2015	FW	DEN	Simon Makienok	Palermo	End of season	
14 September 2015	FW	ENG	Conor McAleny	Everton	7 November 2015	
2 January 2016	DF	AUS	Rhys Williams	Middlesbrough	30 January 2016	
4 January 2016	MF	URU	Diego Poyet	West Ham United	End of season	
1 February 2016	FW	FRA	Yaya Sanogo	Arsenal	End of season	
1 February 2016	DF	FRA	Rod Fanni	Al-Arabi SC	End of season	
15 February 2016	DF	KOR	Yun Suk-young	Queens Park Rangers	End of season	

=== Loans out ===
Date from	Position	Nationality	Name	To	Date until	Ref.
6 July 2015	GK	ENG	Dillon Phillips	Cheltenham Town	2 January 2016	
27 July 2015	GK	SRB	Marko Dmitrović	AD Alcorcón	End of season	
29 July 2015	FW	POL	Piotr Parzyszek	Randers	3 February 2016	
8 August 2015	FW	ENG	Joe Pigott	Southend United	2 January 2016	
18 August 2015	DF	ENG	Ayo Obileye	Dagenham & Redbridge	2 January 2016	
20 August 2015	FW	GHA (Note: Ansah was born in Bexley, England, and represented them at U-16 and U-17 level, but also qualified to represent Ghana internationally and has confirmed his international allegiance to them.)	Zak Ansah	Newport County	17 September 2015	
28 August 2015	MF	ENG	Callum Harriott	Colchester United	2 January 2016	
1 September 2015	AM	ENG	Tobi Sho-Silva	Inverness Caledonian Thistle	1 January 2016	
1 September 2015	DF	ENG	Terrell Thomas	Woking	3 October 2015	
2 October 2015	DF	ENG	Harry Lennon	Gillingham	20 November 2015	
23 November 2015	FW	SCO	Tony Watt	Cardiff City	16 January 2016	
7 January 2016	MF	ENG	Ollie Muldoon	Dagenham & Redbridge	End of season	
15 January 2016	FW	ENG	Karlan Ahearne-Grant	Cambridge United	13 February 2016	
28 January 2016	FW	ENG	Joe Pigott	Luton Town	End of season	
29 January 2016	FW	SCO	Tony Watt	Blackburn Rovers	End of season	
12 February 2016	DF	ENG	Josh Staunton	St Albans City	12 March 2016	
16 February 2016	MF	ENG	Alex Kelly	VCD Athletic	End of season	
18 March 2016	DF	ENG	Tareiq Holmes-Dennis	Oldham Athletic	End of season	

== Competitions ==
=== Pre-season friendlies ===
On 18 May 2015, Charlton Athletic announced they would face Welling United in a pre-season friendly on 11 July 2015. On 29 May 2015, the club announced three XI pre-season friendlies. On 1 June 2015, the club announced they will head to Belgium on a pre-season tour and play two games. One confirmed is against Sint Truiden on 18 July 2015. Two days later, Southend United and Dagenham & Redbridge was added to the schedule. On 4 June 2015, a friendly against Genk was announced. Two days later, two home pre-season friendlies were announced. On 12 July 2015, Charlton Athletic announced a replacement friendly against Bolton Wanderers due to A.C. ChievoVerona cancelling friendlies against both teams.

11 July 2015 Friendly	Welling United	0–2	Charlton Athletic	Welling
15:00 BST		Report	Ahearne-Grant 3', 6'	Stadium: Park View Road; Attendance: 2,100; Referee: Ian Crouch

15 July 2015 Friendly	Genk	1–0	Charlton Athletic	Genk, Belgium
18:00 CEST	de Camargo 39'	Report		Stadium: Cristal Arena; Referee: Christof Virant

18 July 2015 Friendly	Dulwich Hamlet	2–3	Charlton Athletic XI	East Dulwich
15:00 BST	Carew 70' (pen.); Mascoll 87'	Report	Aribo 15'; Jackson 43'; Sinclair 68'	Stadium: Champion Hill; Attendance: 754

18 July 2015 Friendly	Sint-Truidense	4–0	Charlton Athletic	Sint-Truiden, Belgium
20:00 CEST	Mbombo 22'; Edmilson 72' (pen.); Schils 80'; Dompé 89'	Report		Stadium: Stayen; Attendance: 3,994

22 July 2015 Friendly	Dagenham & Redbridge	0–2	Charlton Athletic	Dagenham
19:30 BST		Report	Partridge 38' (o.g.); Holmes-Dennis 66'	Stadium: Victoria Road; Attendance: 719; Referee: Darren Deadman

23 July 2015 Friendly	Maidstone United	1–1	Charlton Athletic XI	Maidstone
19:45 BST	Akrofi 61'	Report	Sinclair 67'	Stadium: Gallagher Stadium; Attendance: 528; Referee: S Finnigan

25 July 2015 Friendly	Charlton Athletic	0–0	West Ham United	Charlton
15:00 BST		Report		Stadium: The Valley; Attendance: 8,678; Referee: Kevin Friend

28 July 2015 Friendly	Southend United	2–1	Charlton Athletic	Southend-on-Sea
19:45 BST	Wordsworth 30'; Mooney 57'	Report	Kennedy 32'	Stadium: Roots Hall; Referee: Nick Kinseley

31 July 2015 Friendly	Bolton Wanderers	2–2	Charlton Athletic	Horwich
20:00 BST	Pratley 24'; Feeney 46'	Report	Watt 43', 60'	Stadium: Macron Stadium; Attendance: 4,541; Referee: Chris Kavanagh

4 August 2015 Friendly	Chelmsford City	2–1	Charlton Athletic XI	Chelmsford
19:45 BST	Bricknell 42'; Sawyer 70'	Report	Ahearne-Grant 14'	Stadium: Melbourne Stadium; Attendance: 371; Referee: Fred Graham

=== Championship ===
==== League table ====
Pos	Team	Pld	W	D	L	GF	GA	GD	Pts	Promotion, qualification or relegation
20	Fulham	46	12	15	19	66	79	−13	51	
21	Rotherham United	46	13	10	23	53	71	−18	49	
22	Charlton Athletic (R)	46	9	13	24	40	80	−40	40	Relegation to EFL League One
23	Milton Keynes Dons (R)	46	9	12	25	39	69	−30	39	Relegation to EFL League One
24	Bolton Wanderers (R)	46	5	15	26	41	81	−40	30	Relegation to EFL League One

Source: BBC Sport
Rules for classification: 1) Points; 2) Goal difference; 3) Number of goals scored
(R) Relegated

==== Results summary ====
Overall								Home						Away					
Pld	W	D	L	GF	GA	GD	Pts	W	D	L	GF	GA	GD	W	D	L	GF	GA	GD
46	9	13	24	40	80	−40	40	5	8	10	23	35	−12	4	5	14	17	45	−28

Last updated: 7 May 2016.

==== Results by round ====
Round	1	2	3	4	5	6	7	8	9	10	11	12	13	14	15	16	17	18	19	20	21	22	23	24	25	26	27	28	29	30	31	32	33	34	35	36	37	38	39	40	41	42	43	44	45	46
Ground	H	A	A	H	A	H	H	A	A	H	A	H	H	A	A	H	A	H	A	H	H	A	A	H	H	A	A	H	A	H	H	A	A	H	A	H	H	A	H	A	A	H	A	H	A	H
Result	W	D	D	W	L	D	L	L	L	D	L	L	L	L	L	W	W	L	L	D	D	L	D	L	D	L	L	D	W	L	D	L	L	L	W	D	W	L	W	D	L	L	D	L	W	L
Position	2	4	5	3	8	10	12	15	17	17	20	22	22	23	23	22	20	21	22	21	22	23	23	23	23	23	23	23	23	24	23	24	24	24	23	23	23	23	23	23	23	23	23	23	22	22

Updated to match(es) played on 7 May 2016. Source:
A = Away; H = Home; W = Win; D = Draw; L = Loss

==== Matches ====
On 17 June 2015, the fixtures for the forthcoming season were announced.

8 August 2015 1	Charlton Athletic	2–0	Queens Park Rangers	Charlton
15:00 BST	Watt 52'; Fox 72'	Report		Stadium: The Valley; Attendance: 19,469; Referee: Robert Madley

15 August 2015 2	Derby County	1–1	Charlton Athletic	Derby
15:00 BST	Martin 68'	Report	Watt 48'	Stadium: Pride Park Stadium; Attendance: 29,045; Referee: Nigel Miller

18 August 2015 3	Nottingham Forest	0–0	Charlton Athletic	Nottingham
19:45 BST		Report		Stadium: City Ground; Attendance: 17,801; Referee: Darren Drysdale

22 August 2015 4	Charlton Athletic	2–1	Hull City	Charlton
15:00 BST	Makienok 52'; Guðmundsson 90+8'	Report	Hernández 90'	Stadium: The Valley; Attendance: 14,844; Referee: Tim Robinson

29 August 2015 5	Wolverhampton Wanderers	2–1	Charlton Athletic	Wolverhampton
15:00 BST	Edwards 65'; Le Fondre 85'	Report	Guðmundsson 55'	Stadium: Molineux Stadium; Attendance: 19,583; Referee: Chris Kavanagh

12 September 2015 6	Charlton Athletic	1–1	Rotherham United	Charlton
15:00 BST	Bauer 65'	Report	Rawson 38'	Stadium: The Valley; Attendance: 15,220; Referee: Keith Stroud

15 September 2015 7	Charlton Athletic	1–2	Huddersfield Town	Charlton
19:45 BST	Sarr 40'	Report	Bunn 11'; Huws 34'	Stadium: The Valley; Attendance: 13,873; Referee: Charles Breakspear

19 September 2015 8	Blackburn Rovers	3–0	Charlton Athletic	Blackburn
15:00 BST	Rhodes 45', 75'; Lawrence 85'	Report		Stadium: Ewood Park; Attendance: 12,088; Referee: Carl Boyeson

26 September 2015 9	Cardiff City	2–1	Charlton Athletic	Cardiff
15:00 BST	Mason 53'; Morrison 76'	Report	Ahearne-Grant 49'	Stadium: Cardiff City Stadium; Attendance: 13,980; Referee: Andrew Madley

4 October 2015 10	Charlton Athletic	2–2	Fulham	Charlton
12:00 BST	Jackson 81'; Cousins 90'	Report	Tunnicliffe 32'; McCormack 59'	Stadium: The Valley; Attendance: 14,662; Referee: James Linington

17 October 2015 11	Reading	1–0	Charlton Athletic	Reading
15:00 BST	Blackman 76'	Report		Stadium: Madejski Stadium; Attendance: 17,614; Referee: Robert Lewis

20 October 2015 12	Charlton Athletic	0–3	Preston North End	Charlton
19:45 BST		Report	Gallagher 2', 36'; Johnson 62'	Stadium: The Valley; Attendance: 13,586; Referee: Simon Hooper

24 October 2015 13	Charlton Athletic	0–3	Brentford	Charlton
15:00 BST		Report	Swift 26'; Judge 55'; Vibe 86'	Stadium: The Valley; Attendance: 14,585; Referee: Stuart Attwell

31 October 2015 14	Middlesbrough	3–0	Charlton Athletic	Middlesbrough
15:00 GMT	Nugent 60'; Adomah 66'; Ayala 78'	Report		Stadium: Riverside Stadium; Attendance: 20,943; Referee: Andy Madley

3 November 2015 15	Milton Keynes Dons	1–0	Charlton Athletic	Milton Keynes
19:45 GMT	Bowditch 29'	Report		Stadium: Stadium:mk; Attendance: 9,575; Referee: Andy Davies

7 November 2015 16	Charlton Athletic	3–1	Sheffield Wednesday	Charlton
15:00 GMT	Jackson 26'; Makienok 45'; Ghoochannejhad 55'	Report	Forestieri 73'	Stadium: The Valley; Attendance: 16,267; Referee: Gavin Ward

21 November 2015 17	Birmingham City	0–1	Charlton Athletic	Birmingham
15:00 GMT		Report	Jackson 61'	Stadium: St Andrew's; Attendance: 16,514; Referee: Darren Drysdale

28 November 2015 18	Charlton Athletic	0–3	Ipswich Town	Charlton
12:30 GMT		Report	Murphy 28', 68'; Sears 45'	Stadium: The Valley; Attendance: 15,870; Referee: Scott Duncan

5 December 2015 19	Brighton & Hove Albion	3–2	Charlton Athletic	Brighton
15:00 GMT	Wilson 50'; Zamora 83'; Hemed 85'	Report	Lookman 2'; Ghoochannejhad 5'	Stadium: Falmer Stadium; Attendance: 24,587; Referee: Keith Stroud

12 December 2015 20	Charlton Athletic	0–0	Leeds United	Charlton
15:00 GMT		Report		Stadium: The Valley; Attendance: 15,867; Referee: Andy Davies

15 December 2015 21	Charlton Athletic	2–2	Bolton Wanderers	Charlton
19:45 GMT	Lookman 1', 26'	Report	Heskey 32'; Vela 42'	Stadium: The Valley; Attendance: 12,294; Referee: Graham Horwood

19 December 2015 22	Burnley	4–0	Charlton Athletic	Burnley
15:00 GMT	Arfield 44', 53'; Gray 55'; Vokes 78'	Report		Stadium: Turf Moor; Attendance: 15,697; Referee: Paul Tierney

26 December 2015 23	Bristol City	1–1	Charlton Athletic	Bristol
15:00 GMT	Baker 45'	Report	Lennon 90'	Stadium: Ashton Gate; Attendance: 15,285; Referee: Oliver Langford

28 December 2015 24	Charlton Athletic	0–2	Wolverhampton Wanderers	Charlton
15:00 GMT		Report	Graham 52'; Lennon 83' (o.g.)	Stadium: The Valley; Attendance: 18,059; Referee: Matthew Buonassissi

2 January 2016 25	Charlton Athletic	1–1	Nottingham Forest	Charlton
15:00 GMT	Makienok 70'	Report	Osborn 44'	Stadium: The Valley; Attendance: 16,090; Referee: Trevor Kettle

12 January 2016 26	Huddersfield Town	5–0	Charlton Athletic	Huddersfield
19:45 GMT	Hudson 17'; Wells 44'; Paterson 75'; Holmes 79'; Davidson 90+2'	Report		Stadium: John Smith's Stadium; Attendance: 9,736; Referee: Geoff Eltringham

16 January 2016 27	Hull City	6–0	Charlton Athletic	Kingston upon Hull
15:00 GMT	Hernández 9', 16', 39'; Snodgrass 33'; Diamé 58'; Hayden 80'	Report		Stadium: KC Stadium; Attendance: 16,430; Referee: Richard Clark

23 January 2016 28	Charlton Athletic	1–1	Blackburn Rovers	Charlton
15:00 GMT	Lennon 30'	Report	Rhodes 45'	Stadium: The Valley; Attendance: 13,512; Referee: Robert Lewis

30 January 2016 29	Rotherham United	1–4	Charlton Athletic	Rotherham
15:00 GMT	Burke 11'	Report	Makienok 4', 69'; Vetokele 44'; Lookman 90+4'	Stadium: New York Stadium; Attendance: 9,227; Referee: Keith Stroud

6 February 2016 30	Charlton Athletic	0–1	Bristol City	Charlton
15:00 GMT		Report	Tomlin 21' (pen.)	Stadium: The Valley; Attendance: 14,342; Referee: Mike Jones

13 February 2016 31	Charlton Athletic	0–0	Cardiff City	Charlton
15:00 GMT		Report		Stadium: The Valley; Attendance: 16,755; Referee: Iain Williamson

20 February 2016 32	Fulham	3–0	Charlton Athletic	Fulham
15:00 GMT	Cairney 32', 78'; Madl 59'	Report		Stadium: Craven Cottage; Attendance: 16,565; Referee: Kevin Friend

23 February 2016 33	Preston North End	2–1	Charlton Athletic	Preston
19:45 GMT	Garner 35'; Robinson 52'	Report	Guðmundsson 37'	Stadium: Deepdale; Attendance: 10,075; Referee: James Adcock

27 February 2016 34	Charlton Athletic	3–4	Reading	Charlton
15:00 GMT	Sanogo 6', 49', 84'	Report	Kermorgant 4', 35'; John 42'; Rakels 90+2'	Stadium: The Valley; Attendance: 21,506; Referee: Nigel Miller

5 March 2016 35	Brentford	1–2	Charlton Athletic	Brentford
15:00 GMT	Barbet 26'	Report	Harriott 1', 69'	Stadium: Griffin Park; Attendance: 10,108; Referee: Brendan Malone

8 March 2016 36	Charlton Athletic	0–0	Milton Keynes Dons	Charlton
19:45 GMT		Report		Stadium: The Valley; Attendance: 13,146; Referee: Charles Breakspear

13 March 2016 37	Charlton Athletic	2–0	Middlesbrough	Charlton
15:30 GMT	Teixeira 57'; Harriott 80'	Report		Stadium: The Valley; Attendance: 14,636; Referee: Darren Deadman

19 March 2016 38	Sheffield Wednesday	3–0	Charlton Athletic	Sheffield
15:00 GMT	Lees 64'; Forestieri 70'; Ba 77' (o.g.)	Report		Stadium: Hillsborough Stadium; Attendance: 29,668; Referee: Stuart Attwell

2 April 2016 39	Charlton Athletic	2–1	Birmingham City	Charlton
15:00 BST	Guðmundsson 38'; Teixeira 90+4'	Report	Toral 32'	Stadium: The Valley; Attendance: 15,742; Referee: Paul Tierney

5 April 2016 40	Ipswich Town	0–0	Charlton Athletic	Ipswich
19:45 BST		Report		Stadium: Portman Road; Attendance: 17,787; Referee: Oliver Langford

9 April 2016 41	Queens Park Rangers	2–1	Charlton Athletic	Shepherd's Bush
15:00 BST	Phillips 45+2'; El Khayati 90+4'	Report	Cousins 62'	Stadium: Loftus Road Stadium; Attendance: 15,834; Referee: Andy Madley

16 April 2016 42	Charlton Athletic	0–1	Derby County	Charlton
15:00 BST		Report	Russell 60'	Stadium: The Valley; Attendance: 15,857; Referee: Darren Bond

19 April 2016 43	Bolton Wanderers	0–0	Charlton Athletic	Bolton
20:00 BST		Report		Stadium: Macron Stadium; Attendance: 12,257; Referee: Eddie Ilderton

23 April 2016 44	Charlton Athletic	1–3	Brighton & Hove Albion	Charlton
15:00 BST	Berg Guðmundsson 51'	Report	Baldock 8'; Skalak 55'; Hemed 90+5' (pen.)	Stadium: The Valley; Attendance: 17,160; Referee: Simon Hooper

30 April 2016 45	Leeds United	1–2	Charlton Athletic	Leeds
15:00 BST	Bamba 71'	Report	Guðmundsson 39'; Lookman 49'	Stadium: Elland Road; Attendance: 25,458; Referee: Keith Hill

7 May 2016 46	Charlton Athletic	0–3	Burnley	Charlton
12:30 BST		Report	Vokes 20'; Boyd 49'; Gray 51'	Stadium: The Valley; Attendance: 16,199; Referee: Roger East

=== League Cup ===
On 16 June 2015, the first round draw was made, Charlton Athletic were drawn at home against Dagenham & Redbridge.

11 August 2015 First round	Charlton Athletic	4–1	Dagenham & Redbridge	Charlton
19:45 BST	Watt 26'; Ahearne-Grant 40'; Bergdich 57'; Ghoochannejhad 77'	Report	Doidge 69'	Stadium: The Valley; Attendance: 5,100; Referee: Stuart Attwell

25 August 2015 Second round	Peterborough United	1–4	Charlton Athletic	Peterborough
19:45 BST	J Anderson 90'	Report	Kennedy 3'; Ahearne-Grant 53' (pen.); Kashi 76'; Vetokele 87'	Stadium: London Road; Attendance: 2,771; Referee: Gary Sutton

23 September 2015 Third round	Crystal Palace	4–1	Charlton Athletic	Selhurst
19:45 BST	Campbell 51'; Gayle 59' (pen.), 74' (pen.), 86'	Report	Sarr 65'; Diarra (red card) 73'	Stadium: Selhurst Park; Attendance: 16,576; Referee: Neil Swarbrick

=== FA Cup ===
9 January 2016 Third round	Colchester United	2–1	Charlton Athletic	Colchester
15:00 GMT	Moncur 28'; Sordell 41'	Report	Ghoochannejhad 90'	Stadium: Colchester Community Stadium; Attendance: 5,742; Referee: Chris Kavanagh

=== Kent Senior Cup ===
On the Kent FA website the first round details were announced, Charlton Athletic will face Hythe Town.

6 October 2015 First round	Hythe Town	0–1	Charlton Athletic	Hythe
19:45 BST		Report	Lookman 85'	Stadium: Reachfields Stadium; Attendance: 231; Referee: J Kasper

4 November 2015 Second round	Cray Wanderers	1–4	Charlton Athletic	Bromley
19:45 BST	Basey 57' (pen.)	Report	Bergdich 33', 83'; Kennedy 47'; Moussa 60' (pen.)	Stadium: Hayes Lane; Attendance: 101; Referee: J Owen

26 January 2016 Quarter-finals	Bromley	0–2	Charlton Athletic	Bromley
19:45 GMT		Report	Aribo 12'; Umerah 20'	Stadium: Hayes Lane; Attendance: 241; Referee: Nick Dunn

15 March 2016 Semi-finals	Ebbsfleet United	1–2	Charlton Athletic	Northfleet
19:45 GMT	Howe 90+2'	Report	Ceballos 35'; Lapslie 37'	Stadium: Stonebridge Road; Attendance: 630; Referee: Simon Finnigan

26 April 2016 Final	Dartford	3–1	Charlton Athletic	Dartford
19:45 GMT	E. Bradbrook 20'; Vint 75'; Francis 79'	Report	Umerah 28'	Stadium: Princes Park; Attendance: 1,005; Referee: P Yates
