= Callum Harriott =

Guyanese footballer (born 1994)

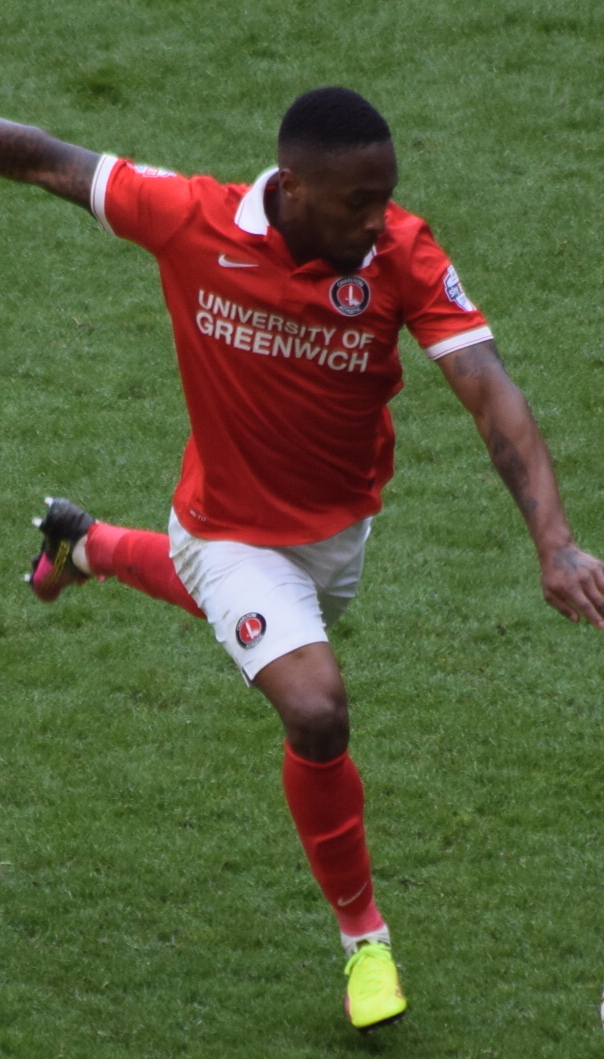
- Harriott playing for Charlton Athletic in 2016

Personal information
- Full name: Callum Kyle Harriott
- Date of birth: 4 March 1994 (age 32)
- Place of birth: Norbury, England
- Height: 1.65 m (5 ft 5 in)
- Position: Winger

Youth career
- 2003–2011: Charlton Athletic

Senior career*
Years	Team	Apps	(Gls)
2011–2016	Charlton Athletic	86	(11)
2015–2016	→ Colchester United (loan)	20	(5)
2016–2019	Reading	25	(2)
2019–2021	Colchester United	58	(12)
2022–2023	Gillingham	3	(0)
2023	Yeovil Town	3	(1)
2023–2024	York City	13	(2)
2024	AFC Croydon Athletic	1	(0)
2024–2025	Ebbsfleet United	10	(0)
2025	Maidenhead United	4	(0)
2026	AFC Croydon Athletic	3	(0)
2026	Braintree Town	5	(0)
Total		231	(33)

International career
2013	England U19	3	(0)
2019–2021	Guyana	9	(1)
- * Club domestic league appearances and goals

Callum Kyle Harriott (born 4 March 1994) is a former professional footballer who played as a winger. Born in England, he represents the Guyana national team.

== Club career ==
=== Charlton Athletic ===
Born in Norbury, Harriott attended Stanley Technical High School and St.Andrews C of E high school in Croydon. He made his debut for the Addicks on 25 April 2011 in a League One game against Rochdale at The Valley, which ended in a 3–1 win for Charlton. He came on as a late substitute for loanee Dean Parrett. He then started his first game for the club two days later in the last game of the 2010–11 season against Hartlepool United.

Although he did not feature for the Charlton first-team in their 2011–12 promotion season, he made his Championship debut after coming off the bench as a 74th-minute substitute for fellow academy graduate Scott Wagstaff in a 2–1 win against Blackpool. He then scored his first senior goal on 9 March 2013, in a 1–0 win away to Huddersfield Town. He scored his second goal for Charlton in a record-breaking 6–0 away win for the Addicks against nine-man Barnsley on 13 April 2013. Harriott was one of the six different scorers for Charlton that match. On 17 May 2013, Harriott signed a new three-year contract with the club. On 3 May 2014, Harriott scored his first senior hat-trick against Blackpool in a 3–0 win at Bloomfield Road.

On 28 August 2015, Harriott was loaned to Colchester United where he was very well received by fans, before returning to Charlton on 2 January 2016.

=== Reading ===
On 5 August 2016, Harriott signed a three-year contract with Reading, moving for an undisclosed fee. He scored his first goals for Reading when he scored a brace in an EFL Cup tie against Milton Keynes Dons which Reading won 4–3 on penalties on 23 August 2016. He was released by Reading at the end of the 2018–19 season. On 8 May 2019, Harriott confirmed that he was leaving Reading following the end of the 2018–19 season.

=== Colchester United ===
On 5 September 2019, Harriott rejoined Colchester United on a two-year contract. He made first appearance in his second spell for the club on 19 October 2019, playing 60 minutes in Colchester's 1–0 home defeat by Morecambe. He scored his first goal since his return to the club on 21 December 2019 in Colchester's 3–0 win against Carlisle United.

After making 64 appearances and scoring twelve goals in his second spell with the U's, Harriott was allowed to leave the club after his contract expired in May 2021.

=== Gillingham ===
Harriott signed a short-term deal for Gillingham on 23 November 2022. He left the club at the end of February 2023.

=== Non-league ===
On 22 March 2023, Harriott signed for National League club Yeovil Town on a short-term contract till end of the season with an option to extend.

However, despite the option to extend, on 1 June 2023, it was confirmed that Harriott had left Yeovil Town following a mutual termination of his contract.

On 11 July 2023, Harriott signed for National League club York City on a contract of undisclosed terms. On 25 November 2024, Harriott left the club by mutual consent due to family reasons.

Harriott played one game for AFC Croydon Athletic on 30 November 2024.

On 7 December 2024, Harriott joined National League side Ebbsfleet United. He departed the club following relegation at the end of the 2024–25 season.

On 8 July 2025, Harriott joined Maidenhead United. On 17 December, he left the club after six appearances.

Harriott returned to AFC Croydon Athletic in January 2026, where he played three games, before Braintree Town announced the signing of Harriott on 21 March 2026.

== International career ==
On 2 May 2013, Harriott was named in manager Noel Blake's England under-19 team to face Belgium, Georgia and Scotland in the 2013 UEFA European Under-19 qualification round. Harriott was eligible to play for Guyana or Jamaica. He received his first call up to the Guyanese national team in March 2019, for their match against Belize and started the match. He scored his first international goal on 16 November in Guyana's 4–2 CONCACAF Nations League victory over Aruba. He featured in all three of Guyana's matches at the 2019 CONCACAF Gold Cup as they exited at the group stage.

== Personal life ==
In July 2021, Harriott appeared in Colchester Magistrates' Court charged with the rape of a woman in November 2019. In August 2022, Harriott was unanimously found not guilty by the jury.

He was released from his contract at York City by mutual consent due to family reasons on 25 November 2024.

== Career statistics ==
=== Club ===
As of match played 11 April 2026

Appearances and goals by club, season and competition
Club	Season	League			FA Cup		League Cup		Other		Total	
Club	Season	Division	Apps	Goals	Apps	Goals	Apps	Goals	Apps	Goals	Apps	Goals
Charlton Athletic	2010–11	League One	3	0	0	0	0	0	0	0	3	0
Charlton Athletic	2011–12	League One	0	0	0	0	0	0	0	0	0	0
Charlton Athletic	2012–13	Championship	14	2	0	0	0	0	–		14	2
Charlton Athletic	2013–14	Championship	28	5	5	1	1	0	–		34	6
Charlton Athletic	2014–15	Championship	21	1	0	0	2	0	–		23	1
Charlton Athletic	2015–16	Championship	20	3	0	0	1	0	–		21	3
Charlton Athletic	Total		86	11	5	1	4	0	0	0	95	12
Colchester United (loan)	2015–16	League One	20	5	2	2	0	0	1 (Note: Appearance in the Football League Trophy)	0	23	7
Reading	2016–17	Championship	13	1	0	0	4	2	–		17	3
Reading	2017–18	Championship	0	0	0	0	0	0	–		0	0
Reading	2018–19	Championship	12	1	1	0	0	0	–		13	1
Reading	Total		25	2	1	0	4	2	0	0	30	4
Colchester United	2019–20	League Two	22	3	1	0	2	0	1 (Note: Appearance in the EFL Trophy)	0	26	3
Colchester United	2020–21	League Two	36	9	1	0	1	0	0	0	38	9
Colchester United	Total		58	12	2	0	3	0	1	0	64	12
Gillingham	2022–23	League Two	3	0	1	0	0	0	0	0	4	0
Yeovil Town	2022–23	National League	3	1	—		—		—		3	1
York City	2023–24	National League	7	1	0	0	—		1 (Note: Appearance in FA Trophy)	0	8	1
York City	2024–25	National League	6	1	1	0	—		0	0	7	1
York City	Total		13	2	1	0	—		1	0	15	2
AFC Croydon Athletic	2024–25	Isthmian League South East Division	1	0	—		—		0	0	1	0
Ebbsfleet United	2024–25	National League	10	0	—		—		1 (Note: Appearance in FA Trophy)	1	11	1
Maidenhead United	2025–26	National League South	4	0	0	0	—		2 (Note: Appearances in Berks & Bucks Senior Cup)	0	6	0
AFC Croydon Athletic	2025–26	Isthmian League South East Division	3	0	—		—		0	0	3	0
Braintree Town	2025–26	National League	5	0	—		—		—		5	0
Career total			231	33	12	3	11	2	6	1	260	39

=== International ===
As of match played 30 March 2021.

International statistics
National team	Year	Apps	Goals
Guyana	2019	7	1
Guyana	2020	0	0
Guyana	2021	2	0
Total		9	1

Scores and results list Guyana's goal tally first

No.	Date	Venue	Opponent	Score	Result	Competition
1.	15 November 2019	Synthetic Track and Field Facility, Leonora, Guyana	Aruba	2–2	4–2	2019–20 CONCACAF Nations League B
