= Johnnie Jackson =

English football manager (born 1982)

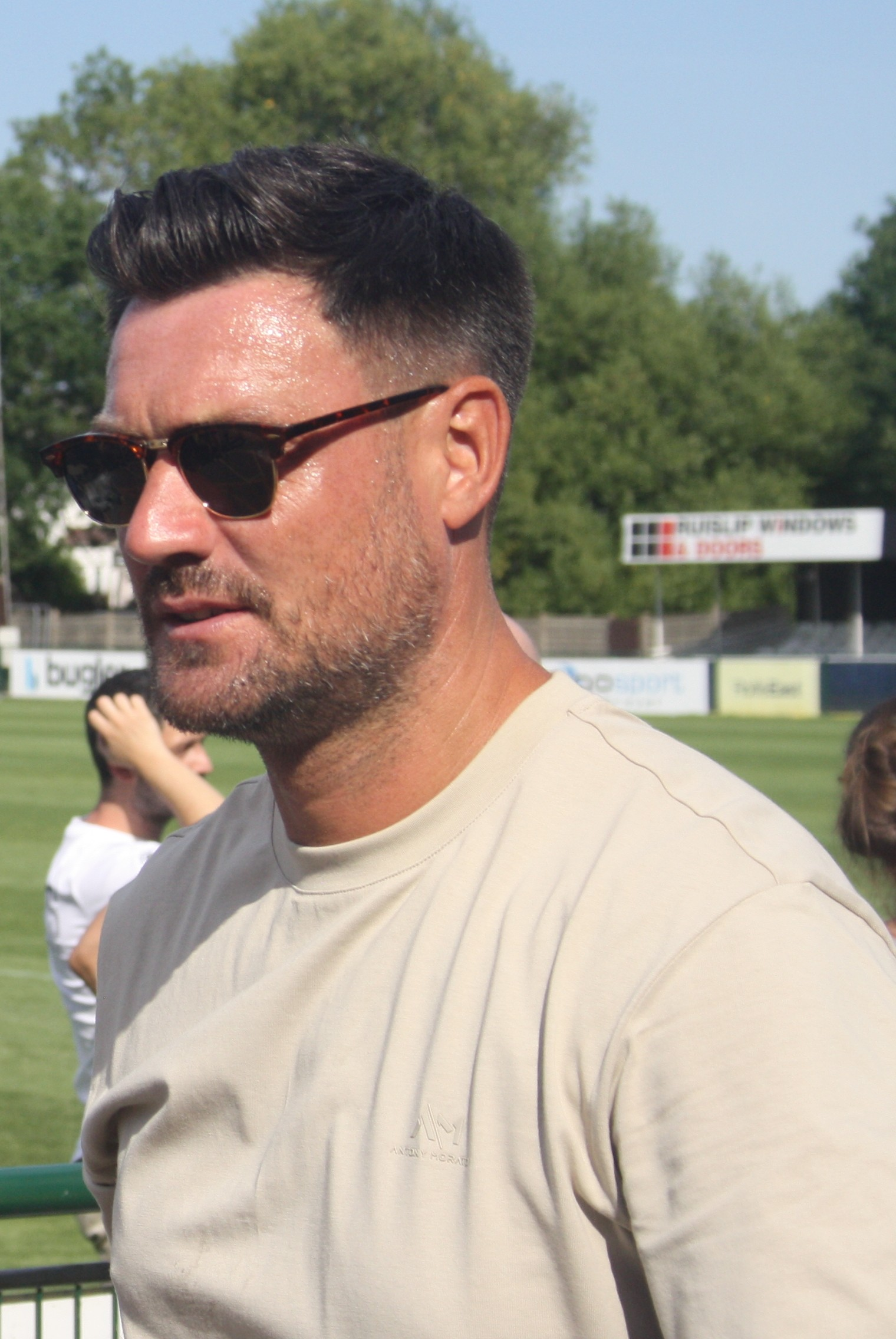
- Jackson with AFC Wimbledon in 2025

Personal information
- Full name: John Alec Jackson
- Date of birth: 15 August 1982 (age 44)
- Place of birth: Camden, England
- Height: 6 ft 1 in (1.85 m)
- Position: Midfielder

Team information
- Current team: AFC Wimbledon (manager)

Senior career*
Years	Team	Apps	(Gls)
1999–2006	Tottenham Hotspur	20	(1)
2002	→ Swindon Town (loan)	13	(1)
2003	→ Colchester United (loan)	8	(0)
2003	→ Coventry City (loan)	5	(2)
2004–2005	→ Watford (loan)	15	(0)
2005	→ Derby County (loan)	6	(0)
2006–2009	Colchester United	107	(13)
2009–2010	Notts County	24	(2)
2010	→ Charlton Athletic (loan)	4	(0)
2010–2018	Charlton Athletic	243	(51)
Total		445	(70)

International career
2000	England U17	1	(0)
2000–2001	England U18	8	(0)
2002	England U20	6	(0)

Managerial career
- 2021: Charlton Athletic (caretaker)
- 2021–2022: Charlton Athletic
- 2022–: AFC Wimbledon
- * Club domestic league appearances and goals

John Alec Jackson (born 15 August 1982) is an English professional football manager and former footballer who played as a midfielder or as a defender. He is the manager of EFL League One club AFC Wimbledon.

== Club career ==
=== Tottenham Hotspur ===
Born in Camden, London, Jackson began his career at Tottenham Hotspur in 1999, signing professional terms in 2000; he continued to progressed through the reserve side. However, he injured both of his knees during the 2001–02 season that affected most of the seasons.

The 2003–04 season saw Jackson making his Tottenham Hotspur debut on 26 December 2003, where he started the whole game, in a 2–0 loss against Portsmouth. He then scored his first goal in the league in a 4–2 win away to Charlton Athletic in February 2004. A month later, Jackson signed a contract extension with the club. At the end of the 2003–04 season, Jackson went on to make thirteen appearances and scoring once in all competitions.

However, he rarely broke into the first-team, making nine league appearances in the next two seasons and was released by Tottenham Hotspur in the summer of 2006. He previously stated he wanted to leave to gain first team football.

==== Loan spells ====
During his time at White Hart Lane he spent many seasons on loan at various lower league clubs. First, he joined Swindon Town on 6 September 2002 but the move hadn't been completed until the following week. After starting the whole game against Queens Park Rangers on 14 September 2002, he went on to score twice, once in the league against Northampton Town, and once in the Football League Trophy against Southend United. After extending his loan spell with the club three times, Jackson returned to his parent club on 13 December 2002.

Jackson then went on loan to Colchester United, whom he would later join on a permanent basis and straight away made his debut for the club, in a 1–1 draw against Brentford on 11 March 2003. Initially a one-month loan spell, Jackson extended his loan spell until the end of the season and went on to make eight appearances for the side.

Jackson joined Coventry City on a one–month deal on 21 November 2003. He scored on his debut, in a 1–1 draw against Crystal Palace on 28 November 2003. Jackson earned admiration while on loan at Coventry City when he scored the last-minute winning goal against local rivals West Bromwich Albion. However, after three–days after scoring his second goal, he was recalled by his parent club, making five appearances and scoring two times.

On 23 December 2004, Jackson was loaned out to Watford on a one–month loan deal. Three days later after signing for the club, he made his debut for the club, starting the whole game, in a 3–0 loss against Reading. Having appeared in a little role for the side and was considering returning to his parent club, he had his loan spell extended for another month following an injury of Brynjar Gunnarsson. He then set up a goal for Bruce Dyer by crossing from a corner to meet Dyer, who scored a header, in a 2–1 win over Ipswich Town on 22 February 2005. From then on, Jackson had a handful of first team opportunities until he returned to his parent club after a three months loan spell that was completed in March 2005.

On 16 September 2005, Jackson was out on loan again when he joined Derby County for three months. After appearing as an unused substitute in a 1–1 draw against Leicester City on 1 October 2005, he made his debut for the club on 15 October 2005, coming on as a second-half substitute, in a 2–1 win over Stoke City. However, with only five appearances for the club, he returned to his parent club in mid–December 2005. He later reflected his time at Derby County, stating that it didn't work out well for him.

=== Colchester United ===
After being released by Tottenham Hotspur in the summer of 2006, he was soon signed on a free transfer by Colchester, who were recently promoted to the Championship, and whom he had played for on loan in 2003.

Jackson made his Colchester United debut for the club, where he started the whole game, in a 2–1 loss against Birmingham City in the opening game of the season. However, he suffered a groin injury and appeared on the substitute bench following his recovery from injury between August and October. But he soon regained his first team place at the club and on 13 February 2007 he scored his first goal for the club, as Colchester lost 2–1 against West Bromwich Albion. Three weeks later, on 2 March 2007, he scored again, in a 5–1 loss against Derby County. Jackson finished his first season, making thirty–three appearances and scoring two times in all competitions.

In the 2007–08 season, Jackson managed to regain his first team place in the club's second season at the Championship. He then scored his first goal of the season on 3 November 2007, in a 1–1 draw against Leicester City. Jackson went on to score two more goals by the end of 2007 against Crystal Palace and Cardiff City. For his performance at the club this season, Jackson signed a contract extension, which believed to run for another two years. Jackson then scored three goals in three matches between 9 February 2008 and 16 February 2008 against Burnley, Preston North End and Hull City. After the match, Jackson said his goal against Hull City was the best ever strike he scored. He then scored his seventh goal of the season on 15 March 2008, in a 1–1 draw against Cardiff City. Despite the club were relegated to League One, Jackson been an ever-present player this season, making forty–eight appearances and scoring eight times in all competitions and at the end of the 2007–08 season, he won the club's Player of the Year award and Gazette Player-of-the-Year award.

In the 2008–09 season, Jackson was managed to stay the club following their relegation. He then scored his first goal of the season on 23 August 2008, in a 3–1 win over Swindon Town. Jackson also later scored three more goals later in the season against Tranmere Rovers, Cheltenham Town and Southend United. However, Jackson missed several games due to a back injury that was aggravated during the 1–1 draw against Milton Keynes Dons. It wasn't the first time during the season he suffered an injury, as it was against Leyton Orient on 28 December 2008, but managed to recover from his injury later on. After returning to the first team from injury against Crewe Alexandra on 14 March 2009, Jackson's return was short–lived when he suffered a hamstring injury during 3–0 loss against Scunthorpe United on 28 March 2009, leading fears that he could be out for the rest of the season. Despite this, he returned in the last game of the season, in a 2–0 win over Yeovil Town. At the end of the 2008–09 season, he went on to make thirty–one appearances and scoring four times in all competitions.

Ahead of the 2009–10 season, Jackson announced his desire to leave Colchester United by requesting a transfer. By the time he announced his departure, Jackson went on to make 120 appearances and scoring thirteen times in all competitions during his three–years time.

=== Notts County ===
On 17 August 2009, Jackson signed for Notts County, signing a three–year contract, on an undisclosed fee.

Jackson made his Notts County debut in the opening game of the season, in a 2–1 loss against Chesterfield but despite the match, he was named Man of the Match by the local newspaper. This was followed up when he scored his first goal for Notts County in the 3–0 win over Dagenham & Redbridge on 22 August 2009. After the match, he described his home debut against Dagenham & Redbridge as "perfect". Since making his debut, Jackson quickly established himself in the starting eleven at the club and found himself competition in central midfielders alongside Neal Bishop and Ricky Ravenhill. Jackson reflected on his position, where he enjoyed playing in his favourite position, central–midfield. However, he suffered a hamstring injury soon after. After returning to the first team from injury, he scored his second County goal came in the FA Cup against Bradford City on 7 November 2009. He continued to plagued by injuries on two occasions by the end of 2009. After this, he featured in the first team until he was dropped from the squad against Grimsby Town on 17 February 2010, as he was loaned out to Charlton Athletic.

Following his loan spell at Charlton Athletic came to an end, Jackson recovered from a hamstring injury and returned to the first team as an unused substitute, in a 1–0 win over Northampton Town on 10 April 2010. This was followed up by returning as a late substitute, in a 3–1 win over Lincoln City on 13 April 2010. He then scored his second league goal for the club on 27 April 2010, in a 5–0 win over Darlington to help them reach promotion to League One. At the end of the 2009–10 season, Jackson went on to make thirty appearances and scoring two times in all competitions.

However, Jackson and his family failed to settle in Nottingham and subsequently left the club to return to London.

=== Charlton Athletic ===
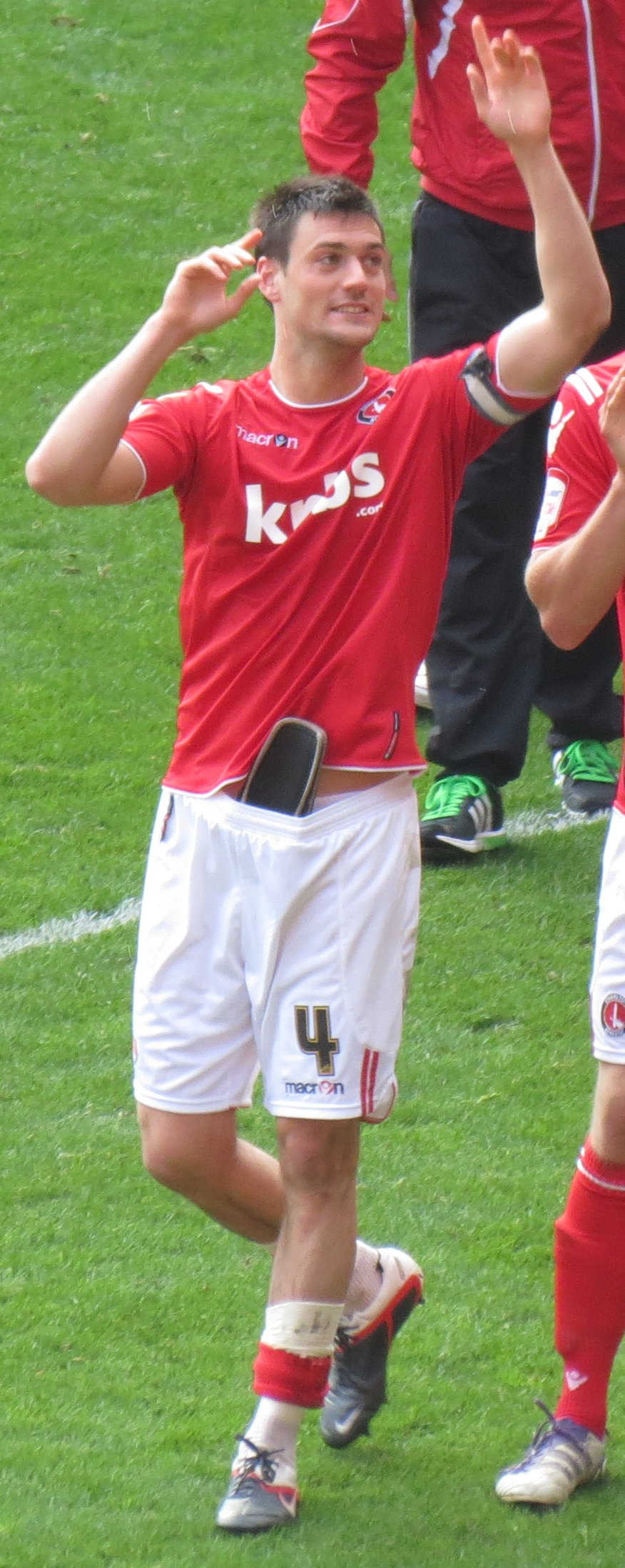
Jackson with Charlton Athletic in 2012

On 18 February 2010 Jackson signed for Charlton Athletic on a one-month loan to cover at left-back following an injury to Grant Basey. Two days after signing for the club, he made his debut on 20 February 2010, playing the whole game, in a 2–0 win over Yeovil Town. However, he went on to make four appearances whilst on loan at Charlton Athletic before returning to his parent club after a hamstring injury ruled him out for six weeks.

Jackson joined Charlton permanently in July 2010 following the end of the 2009–10 season. Jackson's first game after signing for the club on a permanent basis came in a 1–0 win over Bournemouth in the opening game of the season. On 25 September 2010 he scored his first goal for the club, in a 2–2 draw against Dagenham & Redbridge. Initially starting out in the left–back position, Jackson began playing in the midfielder throughout the 2010–11 season. He then went on goal–scoring spree throughout November, scoring against Swindon Town, Peterborough (twice), Yeovil Town (twice). and Luton Town (also scoring another in the FA Cup replay). As a result, he was named the League One Player of the Month for November. He then went on a goal scoring spree for the second time this season, which were against Brighton & Hove Albion, Colchester United (twice), Swindon Town and Sheffield Wednesday. He also scored another goal on 12 February 2011, in a 3–2 win over Peterborough United. However, during a 1–0 loss against Notts County on 25 February 2011, he suffered Achilles injury and was subsequently out for the rest of the season. In his first season at Charlton Athletic, Jackson made thirty–six appearances and scoring fifteen times in all competitions.

Jackson signed a two–year contract with the club and was then appointed club captain for the 2011–12 season. He scored his first goal of the season, in a 3–0 win over Bournemouth. He scored two more goals throughout August against Scunthorpe United and Bury. After adding two more goals to his tally by November, he scored twice on 5 November 2011, in a 5–2 win over Preston North End, followed up by scoring in a 4–0 win over Halifax Town. In January 2012, Jackson scored two goals, both coming from free kicks in crucial 1–0 wins against both Sheffield Wednesday and Sheffield United. For his performance, he was named January's Player of the Month. Shortly after, he scored a brace, in a 2–1 win over MK Dons on 14 February 2012. Despite suffering from injuries setback, Jackson scored 13 goals in thirty–nine appearances in all competitions from left-midfield, as he led Charlton to the League One title, in which he described this as his favourite football moment. He was also shortlisted for the League One Player of the Year, but lost out to Jordan Rhodes. He also included for the 2011–12 PFA Team of the Year. Manager Chris Powell praised Jackson's role to his leadership to help the club gain promotion to the Championship.

Ahead of the 2012–13 season, on 29 June 2012, Jackson signed a two-year contract extension. Jackson continued his scoring record in the Championship, when he scored two goals in two matches on 22 September 2012 and 29 September 2012 against Ipswich Town and Blackburn Rovers. However, he suffered a hamstring injury during the match against Blackburn Rovers and was sidelined for two weeks. After returning to the first team from injury, Jackson then scored twice on 6 November 2012, in a 5–4 win against Cardiff City. His 100th appearance for the club came on 3 December 2012, in a 0–0 draw against rivals, Millwall. On 1 January 2013 he scored in a 1–1 draw against Watford, followed up by scoring in a 2–1 win over Blackpool. Two weeks later on 26 January 2013 he scored again, in a 2–1 loss against Sheffield Wednesday. Later in the 2012–13 season, Jackson later added five more goals, adding a further 12 goals to his tally this season as Charlton finished in a secure ninth place. At the end of the 2012–13 season, he reflected the season as a success following their stay in the Championship next season.

However at the start of the 2013–14 season, Jackson missed out several matches to the season, due to injuries. After returning to the first team from injury, Jackson then scored his first goal for the club on 9 November 2013, in a 4–2 loss against Leeds United. However, in a 2–2 draw against Yeovil Town on 7 December 2013, he scored but was sent–off in the second half "for a rash challenge 13 minutes from time." After serving a three match suspension, Jackson then scored again, just coming on as substitute in the 80th minute, in a 1–1 draw against Ipswich Town on 1 January 2014. On 14 March 2014, Jackson signed a new two-year contract extension with the Addicks. He later regained his first team place following his return from injury and added two goals to his tally against Queens Park Rangers and Watford. At the end of the 2013–14 season, Jackson finished the season, making forty–four appearances and scoring five times in all competitions.

In the 2014–15 season, Jackson started the season well when he set up a goal for Igor Vetokele, in a 1–1 draw against Brentford in the opening game of the season. On 30 September 2014 he scored his first goal of the season, in a 1–0 win over Norwich City and scored again three weeks later, on 21 October 2014, in a 2–1 win over Bolton Wanderers. However, later in the 2014–15 season, Jackson was plagued by injuries. On his last game of the season against Brentford on 14 February 2015, which saw them win 3–0, Jackson revealed that he played through the pain of a cracked rib before being substituted by the second half. Nevertheless, he went on to make twenty–eight appearances and scoring two times in all competitions.

Ahead of the 2015–16 season, Jackson returned to training and featured in several friendly matches at the pre–season. He made his first appearance since February, where he set up one of the goals, in a 4–1 win over Dagenham & Redbridge in the first round of League Cup. Four days later, on 15 August 2015, Jackson made his 200 appearances for Charlton Athletic, coming on as a later substitute, in a 1–1 draw against Derby County. However, his playing was reduced by the end of September 2015, due to being on the substitute bench and injuries. After returning to the first team from injury, he scored a free–kick on his return, in a 2–2 draw against Fulham on 4 October 2015. After the match, Manager Guy Luzon praised his performance, while Jackson, himself, said he was proud to score a free–kick. On 7 November 2015, he scored again, in a 3–1 win over Sheffield Wednesday, followed up by scoring his 50th goal for the club in a 0–1 away win at St Andrew's against Birmingham City on 21 November 2015. Shortly after, he signed a contract extension, keeping him until 2017. After this, Jackson declared the club as his home. Despite being on the substitute bench and injuries, his playing time was soon reduced because of this later in the season and the club were subsequently relegated to League One. At the end of the 2015–16 season, Jackson went on to make thirty appearances and scoring three times in all competitions.

The 2016–17 season started well for Jackson when he scored two goals in two matches against Northampton Town and Shrewsbury Town. After suffering a hamstring injury in late–August, he then scored in a 1–1 draw against Oxford United on 24 September 2016. After making his 250th appearance for the club against MK Dons on 26 December 2016, he, however, suffered a hamstring injury. Despite this, Jackson returned to the first team, but soon have his playing time reduced and appeared on the substitute bench for the rest of the season. He later added his fourth goal to this tally this season, which came in a 2–1 win over Scunthorpe United on 7 March 2017. At the end of the 2016–17 season, he went on to make thirty–three appearances and scoring four times in all competitions.

With his contract expiring at the end of the 2016–17 season, Jackson was expected to stay at the club as a coach and sign a contract extension, with Manager Karl Robinson keen on keeping him and would be allowed to play if needed. Jackson, himself, agreed that he was keen on staying on for the side next season and had his contract triggered for another 12 months, keeping him until 2018.

In the 2017–18 season, Jackson began to appear a part-time role in the first team, in order to focus on being a coach. His first appearance of the season came on 8 August 2017, where he started the whole game, in a 2–1 win over Exeter City in the first round of the League Cup. Although Chris Solly took up the captaincy in his absence throughout the season, Jackson occasionally appeared as captain in number of matches. Jackson later announced his retirement on 16 March 2018 to take up full-time coaching at the club. On the club's last game of the season against Blackburn Rovers, Jackson was given a lap of honour after the game before addressing the crowd over the public-address system. He also wrote an open letter to the club's supporters. Despite suffering another injury later in the 2017–18 season,

Jackson retired from playing at the end of the 2017–18 season, and joined Charlton as a coach.

== Coaching and managerial career ==
=== Charlton Athletic ===
Shortly after having his contract triggered for another 12 months at the end of the 2016–17 season, local newspaper Kent Live reported that Jackson was appointed as new first-team coach. Jackson became part of Robinson's backroom staff, alongside Lee Bowyer and Steve Gallen.

After Robinson's departure as manager on 22 March 2018, it was announced that Jackson would assist Bowyer as caretaker manager despite initial reports that Jackson was expected to be appointed as caretaker manager instead. On 15 March 2021, Bowyer resigned as Charlton Athletic manager and Jackson was put in caretaker charge of the club.

Jackson was named caretaker manager of Charlton Athletic for a second time on 21 October 2021 following the departure of former manager Nigel Adkins. After achieving nine wins in 13 matches during his caretaker spell, Jackson was named permanent manager on 17 December 2021. Despite this, on 3 May 2022, it was announced that Jackson had been dismissed as manager following the conclusion of the 2021–22 season.

=== AFC Wimbledon ===
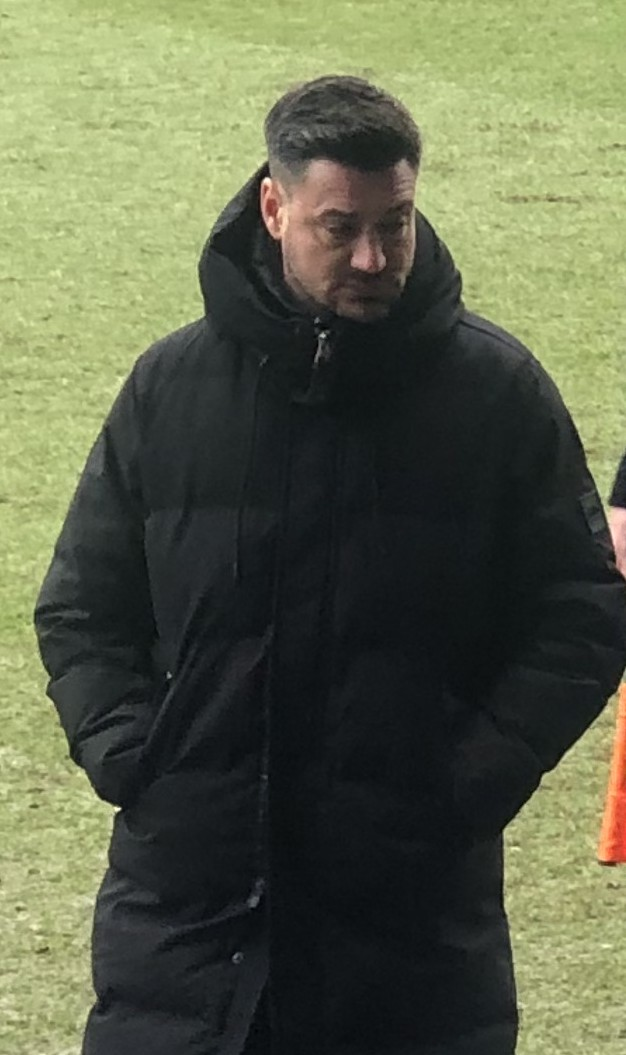
Jackson in 2025

On 16 May 2022, Jackson was appointed as manager of League Two club AFC Wimbledon on a two-year deal, replacing the club's short term interim-manager Mark Bowen following their relegation from League One. Following a mixed start to the season, Jackson was awarded the EFL League Two Manager of the Month award for November 2022 having earned seven points from three matches, all against fellow promotion hopefuls.

On 8 February 2024, Jackson and assistant manager Terry Skiverton committed their long-term futures to the Dons, extending their contracts to 2026.

In 2025, AFC Wimbledon were promoted to League One after succeeding in the play-off final.

== International career ==
Jackson played for England for England U17, England U18 and England U20.

== Personal life ==
Outside of football, Jackson said he still plays guitar. Despite progressing in the Tottenham Hotspur youth set-up, Jackson, however, grew up supporting rivals Arsenal.

He's married and his wife gave birth to a baby daughter, as she was heavily pregnant at the time he joined Charlton Athletic in February 2010. This also led Jackson returning to Charlton in the summer of 2010.

Jackson also founded the Johnnie Jackson Academy for boys and girls aged between 5-14 and has started taking coaching badges.

== Career statistics ==
Appearances and goals by club, season and competition
Club	Season	League			FA Cup		League Cup		Other		Total	
Club	Season	Division	Apps	Goals	Apps	Goals	Apps	Goals	Apps	Goals	Apps	Goals
Tottenham Hotspur	2003–04	Premier League	11	1	3	0	0	0	0	0	14	1
Tottenham Hotspur	2004–05	Premier League	8	0	0	0	1	0	0	0	9	0
Tottenham Hotspur	2005–06	Premier League	1	0	0	0	0	0	0	0	1	0
Tottenham Hotspur	Total		20	1	3	0	1	0	0	0	24	1
Swindon Town (loan)	2002–03	Second Division	13	1	2	0	0	0	2 (Note: Appearance in the Football League Trophy)	1	17	2
Colchester (loan)	2002–03	Second Division	8	0	0	0	0	0	0	0	8	0
Coventry City (loan)	2003–04	First Division	5	2	0	0	0	0	0	0	5	2
Watford (loan)	2004–05	Championship	15	0	0	0	—		0	0	15	0
Derby County (loan)	2005–06	Championship	6	0	0	0	0	0	0	0	6	0
Colchester	2006–07	Championship	32	2	1	0	0	0	0	0	33	2
Colchester	2007–08	Championship	46	7	1	0	1	0	0	0	48	7
Colchester	2008–09	League One	29	4	1	0	1	0	3	0	34	4
Colchester	Total		107	13	3	0	2	0	3	0	115	13
Notts County	2009–10	League Two	24	2	6	1	0	0	0	0	30	3
Charlton Athletic (loan)	2009–10	League One	4	0	—		0	0	0	0	4	0
Charlton Athletic	2010–11	League One	30	13	5	2	0	0	3	0	38	15
Charlton Athletic	2011–12	League One	36	12	2	1	0	0	1	0	39	13
Charlton Athletic	2012–13	Championship	43	12	1	0	1	0	0	0	45	12
Charlton Athletic	2013–14	Championship	38	5	5	0	1	0	0	0	44	5
Charlton Athletic	2014–15	Championship	26	2	1	0	1	0	0	0	28	2
Charlton Athletic	2015–16	Championship	29	3	0	0	1	0	0	0	30	3
Charlton Athletic	2016–17	League One	30	4	2	1	1	0	0	0	33	5
Charlton Athletic	2017–18	League One	11	0	1	0	2	0	4 (Note: Appearance in EFL Trophy)	0	18	0
Charlton Athletic	Total		243	51	17	4	7	0	8	0	275	55
Career total			445	70	31	5	10	0	13	1	499	76

== Managerial statistics ==
As of match played 21 November 2026

Managerial record by team and tenure
Team	From	To	Record					Ref.
Team	From	To	P	W	D	L	Win %	Ref.
Charlton Athletic (caretaker)	15 March 2021	18 March 2021	1	1	0	0	100.0	
Charlton Athletic	21 October 2021	3 May 2022	40	19	6	15	47.5	
AFC Wimbledon	16 May 2022	Present	246	88	63	95	35.8	
Total			287	108	69	110	37.6	

== Honours ==
=== As a player ===
Notts County

- Football League Two: 2009–10

Charlton Athletic

- Football League One: 2011–12

Individual

- PFA Team of the Year: 2011–12 League One

=== As a manager ===
AFC Wimbledon

- EFL League Two play-offs: 2025

Individual

- EFL League Two Manager of the Month: November 2022
