= 2012–13 Charlton Athletic F.C. season =

Charlton Athletic F.C.
- Chairman: Michael Slater
- Manager: Chris Powell
- Stadium: The Valley
- Championship: 9th
- FA Cup: Third round
- League Cup: First round
- Top goalscorer: League: Johnnie Jackson (12); All: Johnnie Jackson (12)
- Highest home attendance: 26,185 (vs. Barnsley, 20 October)
- Lowest home attendance: 5,914 (vs. Leyton Orient, 14 August)
- Average home league attendance: 18,499
Home colours	Away colours

Following their title winning campaign in League One last season, Charlton Athletic's 2012–13 campaign was their first back in the Championship since the 2008–09 season. Along with competing in the Championship, the club also participated in the FA Cup and League Cup. The season covered the period from 1 July 2012 to 30 June 2013.

== Kit ==
Sportswear giants Nike replaced Macron as Kit suppliers, with Andrews Air Conditioning being the front of shirt sponsor.

== League table ==
Pos	Team	Pld	W	D	L	GF	GA	GD	Pts
7	Bolton Wanderers	46	18	14	14	69	61	+8	68
8	Nottingham Forest	46	17	16	13	63	59	+4	67
9	Charlton Athletic	46	17	14	15	65	59	+6	65
10	Derby County	46	16	13	17	65	62	+3	61
11	Burnley	46	16	13	17	62	60	+2	61

Updated to match(es) played on 4 May 2013. Source: BBC Sport
Rules for classification: 1) points; 2) goal difference; 3) number of goals scored.

== Players ==
No.	Name	Nationality	Position (s)	Date of birth (age)	Signed from
Goalkeepers
1	Ben Hamer	(England)	GK	20 November 1987 (age 38)	(England) Reading
13	John Sullivan	(England)	GK	8 March 1988 (age 38)	(England) Millwall
27	David Button	(England)	GK	27 February 1989 (age 37)	(England) Tottenham Hotspur
30	Nick Pope	(England)	GK	19 April 1992 (age 34)	(England) Bury Town
Defenders
3	Cedric Evina	(Cameroon)	DF	16 November 1991 (age 35)	(England) Oldham Athletic
5	Michael Morrison	(England)	DF	3 March 1988 (age 38)	(England) Sheffield Wednesday
6	Matt Taylor	(England)	DF	30 January 1982 (age 44)	(England) Exeter City
15	Yado Mambo	(England)	DF	22 October 1991 (age 35)	Youth system
16	Rhoys Wiggins	(Wales) (Note: Wiggins was born in Hillingdon, England, but also qualified to represent Wales internationally and represented them at U-17, U-19, and U-21 level.)	DF	4 November 1987 (age 39)	(England) Bournemouth
20	Chris Solly	(England)	DF	20 January 1991 (age 35)	Youth system
23	Lawrie Wilson	(England)	DF	11 September 1987 (age 39)	(England) Stevenage
28	Leon Cort	(Guyana) (Note: Cort was born in Southwark, England, but also qualified to represent Guyana internationally and made his international debut for Guyana in 2010.)	DF	11 September 1979 (age 47)	(England) Burnley
29	Kevin Feely	(Republic of Ireland) (Note: Feely was born in Brussels, Belgium, but also qualified to represent the Republic of Ireland internationally and represented them at U-21 level.)	DF	30 August 1992 (age 34)	(Republic of Ireland) Bohemians
33	Harry Osborne	(England)	DF	3 March 1994 (age 32)	Youth system
36	Morgan Fox	(Wales) (Note: Fox was born in Chelmsford, England, but also qualified to represent Wales internationally and represented them at U-21 level.)	DF	21 September 1993 (age 33)	Youth system
39	Semi Ajayi	(Nigeria) (Note: Ajayi was born in Bexley, England, but also qualified to represent Nigeria internationally and represented them at U-20 level before making his international debut for Nigeria in August 2018.)	DF	9 November 1993 (age 33)	Youth system
44	Dorian Dervite	(France)	DF	25 July 1988 (age 38)	(Spain) Villarreal B
Midfielders
2	Andrew Hughes	(England)	MF	2 January 1978 (age 48)	(England) Scunthorpe United
4	Johnnie Jackson	(England)	MF	15 August 1982 (age 44)	(England) Notts County
7	Danny Green	(England)	MF	9 July 1988 (age 38)	(England) Dagenham & Redbridge
8	Dale Stephens	(England)	MF	12 December 1989 (age 36)	(England) Oldham Athletic
11	Scott Wagstaff	(England)	MF	31 March 1990 (age 36)	Youth system
12	Salim Kerkar	(France)	MF	4 August 1987 (age 39)	(Scotland) Rangers
14	Bradley Pritchard	(Zimbabwe)	MF	19 December 1989 (age 36)	(England) Hayes & Yeading United
21	Mark Gower	(England)	MF	5 October 1978 (age 48)	(Wales) Swansea City
22	Danny Hollands	(England)	MF	6 November 1985 (age 41)	(England) Bournemouth
31	Jordan Cousins	(England)	MF	6 March 1994 (age 32)	Youth system
32	Callum Harriott	(England) (Note: Harriott was born in Croydon, England, and represented them at U-19 level, but also qualified to represent Guyana and Jamaica internationally and would make his international debut for Guyana in March 2019.)	MF	4 March 1994 (age 32)	Youth system
37	Bradley Jordan	(England)	MF	21 January 1994 (age 32)	Youth system
	Florent Rouamba	(Burkina Faso)	MF	31 December 1986 (age 39)	(Moldova) Sheriff Tiraspol
Forwards
9	Danny Haynes	(England)	FW	19 January 1988 (age 38)	(England) Barnsley
10	Bradley Wright-Phillips	(England)	FW	12 March 1985 (age 41)	(England) Plymouth Argyle
17	Jordan Cook	(England)	FW	20 March 1990 (age 36)	(England) Sunderland
18	Yann Kermorgant	(France)	FW	8 November 1981 (age 45)	(England) Leicester City
19	Ricardo Fuller	(Jamaica)	FW	31 October 1979 (age 47)	(England) Stoke City
26	Jonathan Obika	(England)	FW	12 September 1990 (age 36)	(England) Tottenham Hotspur
34	Michael Smith	(England)	FW	17 October 1991 (age 35)	(England) Darlington
35	Joe Pigott	(England)	FW	24 November 1993 (age 32)	Youth system
38	Ade Azeez	(England)	FW	8 January 1994 (age 32)	Youth system
Left club during season
21	Ruben Bover	(Spain)	MF	24 June 1992 (age 34)	(England) Halesowen Town
24	Eggert Jónsson	(Iceland)	MF	18 August 1988 (age 38)	(England) Wolverhampton Wanderers
25	Abdul Razak	(Ivory Coast)	MF	11 November 1992 (age 34)	(England) Manchester City
25	Danny Seaborne	(England)	DF	5 March 1987 (age 39)	(England) Southampton
26	Emmanuel Frimpong	(Ghana) (Note: Frimpong was born in Kumasi, Ghana, but was raised in England and represented them at U-16 and U-17 level before making his international debut for Ghana in March 2013.)	MF	10 January 1992 (age 34)	(England) Arsenal
29	Rob Hulse	(England)	FW	25 October 1979 (age 47)	(England) Queens Park Rangers
39	Paul Hayes	(England)	FW	20 September 1983 (age 43)	(England) Preston North End
40	Leon Clarke	(England)	FW	10 February 1985 (age 41)	(England) Swindon Town

== Squad statistics ==
=== Appearances and goals ===
No.	Pos	Nat	Player	Total		Championship		FA Cup		League Cup	
No.	Pos	Nat	Player	Apps	Goals	Apps	Goals	Apps	Goals	Apps	Goals
1	GK	(England) ENG	Ben Hamer	42	0	41	0	0	0	1	0
2	MF	(England) ENG	Andrew Hughes	6	0	6	0	0	0	0	0
3	DF	(Cameroon) CMR	Cedric Evina	14	0	10+2	0	1	0	1	0
4	MF	(England) ENG	Johnnie Jackson (C)	45	12	41+2	12	0+1	0	0+1	0
5	DF	(England) ENG	Michael Morrison	45	1	44	1	0+1	0	0	0
6	DF	(England) ENG	Matt Taylor	14	0	6+6	0	1	0	1	0
7	MF	(England) ENG	Danny Green	18	1	7+10	1	0	0	1	0
8	MF	(England) ENG	Dale Stephens	29	2	26+2	2	1	0	0	0
9	FW	(England) ENG	Danny Haynes	20	7	12+8	7	0	0	0	0
10	FW	(England) ENG	Bradley Wright-Phillips	21	1	10+9	1	1	0	0+1	0
11	MF	(England) ENG	Scott Wagstaff	10	2	7+2	1	0	0	1	1
12	MF	(France) FRA	Salim Kerkar	24	1	15+7	1	1	0	1	0
14	MF	(Zimbabwe) ZIM	Bradley Pritchard	44	3	36+6	3	1	0	0+1	0
16	DF	(Wales) WAL	Rhoys Wiggins	20	0	19+1	0	0	0	0	0
17	FW	(England) ENG	Jordan Cook	9	0	1+6	0	1	0	1	0
18	FW	(France) FRA	Yann Kermorgant	33	11	28+4	11	1	0	0	0
19	FW	(Jamaica) JAM	Ricardo Fuller	31	5	20+11	5	0	0	0	0
20	DF	(England) ENG	Chris Solly	45	1	45	1	0	0	0	0
21	MF	(England) ENG	Mark Gower	6	0	2+4	0	0	0	0	0
22	MF	(England) ENG	Danny Hollands	16	0	11+4	0	0	0	1	0
23	DF	(England) ENG	Lawrie Wilson	31	2	25+4	2	1	0	1	0
24	MF	(Iceland) ISL	Eggert Jónsson	2	0	1+1	0	0	0	0	0
25	MF	(Ivory Coast) CIV	Abdul Razak	2	0	2	0	0	0	0	0
25	DF	(England) ENG	Danny Seaborne	7	0	7	0	0	0	0	0
26	MF	(Ghana) GHA	Emmanuel Frimpong	6	0	6	0	0	0	0	0
26	FW	(England) ENG	Jonathan Obika	10	3	2+8	3	0	0	0	0
27	GK	(England) ENG	David Button	6	0	5	0	1	0	0	0
28	DF	(Guyana) GUY	Leon Cort	31	2	30	2	0	0	1	0
29	FW	(England) ENG	Rob Hulse	15	3	10+5	3	0	0	0	0
30	GK	(England) ENG	Nick Pope	1	0	0+1	0	0	0	0	0
32	MF	(England) ENG	Callum Harriott	14	2	11+3	2	0	0	0	0
34	FW	(England) ENG	Michael Smith	1	0	0	0	0	0	1	0
38	FW	(England) ENG	Ade Azeez	1	0	0	0	0+1	0	0	0
44	DF	(France) FRA	Dorian Dervite	31	3	20+10	3	1	0	0	0

=== Top scorers ===
Place	Position	Nation	Number	Name	Championship	FA Cup	League Cup	Total
1	MF	(England)	4	Johnnie Jackson	12	0	0	12
2	FW	(France)	18	Yann Kermorgant	11	0	0	11
3	FW	(England)	9	Danny Haynes	7	0	0	7
4	FW	(Jamaica)	19	Ricardo Fuller	5	0	0	5
5	FW	(England)	29	Rob Hulse	3	0	0	3
=	DF	(France)	44	Dorian Dervitte	3	0	0	3
=	MF	(Zimbabwe)	14	Bradley Pritchard	3	0	0	3
=	MF	(England)	26	Jonathan Obika	3	0	0	3
6	DF	(Guyana)	28	Leon Cort	2	0	0	2
=	MF	(England)	8	Dale Stephens	2	0	0	2
=	MF	(England)	11	Scott Wagstaff	1	0	1	2
=	FW	(England)	23	Lawrie Wilson	2	0	0	2
=	MF	(England)	32	Callum Harriott	2	0	0	2
7	MF	(England)	7	Danny Green	1	0	0	1
=	DF	(England)	5	Michael Morrison	1	0	0	1
=	DF	(England)	20	Chris Solly	1	0	0	1
=	FW	(England)	10	Bradley Wright-Phillips	1	0	0	1
=	MF	(France)	12	Salim Kerkar	1	0	0	1
	-	-	-	Own goal	4	0	0	4
Totals					65	0	1	66

=== Disciplinary record ===
Number	Nation	Position	Name	Championship		FA Cup		League Cup		Total	
Number	Nation	Position	Name	Yellow card	Red card	Yellow card	Red card	Yellow card	Red card	Yellow card	Red card
4	(England)	MF	Johnnie Jackson	9	0	0	0	0	0	9	0
5	(England)	DF	Michael Morrison	6	1	0	0	0	0	6	1
23	(England)	DF	Lawrie Wilson	6	0	0	0	0	0	6	0
8	(England)	MF	Dale Stephens	6	0	0	0	0	0	6	0
14	(Zimbabwe)	MF	Bradley Pritchard	5	0	1	0	0	0	6	0
29	(England)	FW	Rob Hulse	4	0	0	0	0	0	4	0
18	(France)	FW	Yann Kermorgant	3	1	0	0	0	0	3	1
20	(England)	DF	Chris Solly	3	0	0	0	0	0	3	0
10	(England)	FW	Bradley Wright-Phillips	2	0	0	0	0	0	2	0
2	(England)	MF	Andrew Hughes	2	0	0	0	0	0	2	0
19	(Jamaica)	FW	Ricardo Fuller	2	0	0	0	0	0	2	0
1	(England)	GK	Ben Hamer	1	0	0	0	0	0	1	0
7	(England)	MF	Danny Green	1	0	0	0	0	0	1	0
26	(Ghana)	MF	Emmanuel Frimpong	1	0	0	0	0	0	1	0
17	(England)	MF	Jordan Cook	1	0	0	0	0	0	1	0
44	(France)	DF	Dorian Dervite	0	0	0	1	0	0	0	1
9	(England)	FW	Danny Haynes	1	0	0	0	0	0	1	0
32	(England)	MF	Callum Harriott	1	0	0	0	0	0	1	0
6	(England)	DF	Matt Taylor	1	0	0	0	0	0	1	0
16	(Wales)	DF	Rhoys Wiggins	1	0	0	0	0	0	1	0
23	(England)	DF	Lawrie Wilson	1	0	0	0	0	0	1	0
21	(England)	MF	Mark Gower	1	0	0	0	0	0	1	0
			TOTALS	58	2	0	1	0	0	58	3

=== Coaching staff ===
Position	Staff
Manager	(England) Chris Powell
Assistant manager	(England) Alex Dyer
First-team coach	(England) Damian Matthew
Football advisor	(England) Keith Peacock
Goalkeeping coach	(England) Ben Roberts
Head physiotherapist	(England) Erol Umut
Club doctor	(England) Dr. John Fraser
Sports scientist	(England) Laurence Bloom
Football secretary	(England) Chris Parkes
Chief scout	(England) Phil Chapple

=== Boardroom ===
Role	Name
Chairman and joint owner	Michael Slater
Director and joint owner	Tony Jimenez
Executive Vice-Chairman	Martin Prothero
Chief Executive	Vacant
Director	Richard Murray
Honorary Life President	Sir Maurice Hatter

== Results ==
=== Pre-season ===
14 July 2012	Welling United	0–4	Charlton Athletic	Park View Road
15:00		Report	Obersteller 49' (o.g.); Smith 54'; Jackson 78' (pen.); Haynes 86'	Attendance: 1,827; Referee: I. Cooper

19 July 2012	(Portugal) Sporting Lisbon	0–1	Charlton Athletic	Estadio Ciudad de Lepe
20:00		Report	Jackson 90'

26 July 2012	Barnet	1–4	Charlton Athletic	Underhill
19:45	Nurse 41'	Report	Wright-Phillips 4'; Kermorgant 28', 62'; Jackson 36'	Attendance: 856; Referee: M. Russell

28 July 2012	Bromley	0–2	Charlton Athletic XI	Hayes Lane
15:00		Report	Ruben Bover 51'; Pigott 76'	Referee: I. Bentley

31 July 2012	Bury Town	1–2	Charlton Athletic	Ram Meadow
19:45	Sands 70'	Report	Azeez 19'; Pigott 87' (pen.)	Attendance: 414; Referee: A. Sannerude

1 August 2012	Crawley Town	0–1	Charlton Athletic	Broadfield Stadium
19:45		Report	Green 22'	Attendance: 1,411

4 August 2012	Gillingham FC	1–0	Charlton Athletic	Priestfield Stadium
15:00	Kedwell 26'	Report

7 August 2012	Tonbridge Angels	2–1	Charlton Athletic XI	Longmead Stadium
19:45	Purcell 31'; Collin 46'	Report	Pigott 6'	Attendance: 732

8 August 2012	Charlton Athletic	3–2	Southend United	The Valley
13:00	Wright-Phillips 78', 79'; Kerkar 82'	Report	Martin 20'; Brogan 40'	Attendance: BCD

11 August 2012	Fulham	1–2	Charlton Athletic	Craven Cottage
15:00	Duff 6'	Report	Jackson 70'; Kermorgant 78'	Attendance: BCD; Referee: A. Marriner

=== Championship ===
==== Club Standings ====
Overall								Home						Away					
Pld	W	D	L	GF	GA	GD	Pts	W	D	L	GF	GA	GD	W	D	L	GF	GA	GD
46	17	14	15	65	59	+6	65	8	6	9	32	34	−2	9	8	6	33	25	+8

Last updated: 4 May 2013.

==== Round-by-Round results ====
Round	1	2	3	4	5	6	7	8	9	10	11	12	13	14	15	16	17	18	19	20	21	22	23	24	25	26	27	28	29	30	31	32	33	34	35	36	37	38	39	40	41	42	43	44	45	46
Ground	A	H	H	A	H	A	A	H	H	A	H	A	A	H	H	A	A	H	H	A	H	A	A	H	H	A	H	A	H	A	H	A	A	H	H	A	A	H	H	A	H	A	A	H	A	H
Result	D	W	D	L	L	L	W	D	L	W	L	D	D	L	W	W	W	D	W	D	D	L	L	L	D	W	W	W	L	L	D	L	W	L	L	D	W	L	W	D	W	W	D	W	D	W
Position	14	3	8	16	18	22	18	19	20	15	18	18	20	21	19	16	14	15	13	13	12	14	18	18	18	15	14	12	12	14	15	15	12	15	15	14	12	15	14	14	12	9	9	9	9	9

Updated to match(es) played on 4 May 2013. Source:
A = Away; H = Home; W = Win; D = Draw; L = Loss

18 August 2012	Birmingham City	1–1	Charlton Athletic	St Andrew's
15:00	Žigić 90'	Report	Cort 82'	Attendance: 18,210; Referee: G. Sutton

21 August 2012	Charlton Athletic	2–1	Leicester City	The Valley
19:45	Wright-Phillips 18'; Kermorgant 32'	Report	King 54'	Attendance: 16,658; Referee: F. Graham

25 August 2012	Charlton Athletic	0–0	Hull City	The Valley
15:00		Report		Attendance: 16,202; Referee: S. Hooper

1 September 2012	Nottingham Forest	2–1	Charlton Athletic	City Ground
15:00	McGugan 17'; Hutchinson 75'	Report	Camp 88' (o.g.)	Attendance: 19,745; Referee: G. Salisbury

14 September 2012	Charlton Athletic	0–1	Crystal Palace	The Valley
19:45		Report	Dikgacoi 51'	Attendance: 21,730; Referee: T. Bates

18 September 2012	Derby County	3–2	Charlton Athletic	Pride Park
19:45	Ward 7', 64' (pen.); Bryson 53'	Report	Green 70'; Kermorgant 73'	Attendance: 20,063; Referee: D. Phillips

22 September 2012	Ipswich Town	1–2	Charlton Athletic	Portman Road
15:00	Scotland 57'	Report	Jackson 48'; Fuller 50'	Attendance: 16,587; Referee: Martin Atkinson

29 September 2012	Charlton Athletic	1–1	Blackburn Rovers	The Valley
15:00	Jackson 27'	Report	Etuhu 15'	Attendance: 17,169; Referee: Darren Deadman

2 October 2012	Charlton Athletic	1–2	Watford	The Valley
19:45	Fuller 35'		Hoban 29'; Abdi 70'	Attendance: 15,585; Referee: Mike Dean

6 October 2012	Blackpool	0–2	Charlton Athletic	Bloomfield Road
15:00		Report	Cort 49'; Solly 73'	Attendance: 13,482; Referee: G. Eltrigham

20 October 2012	Charlton Athletic	0–1	Barnsley	The Valley
15:00		Report	Cywka 64'	Attendance: 26,185; Referee: M. Russell

23 October 2012	Leeds United	1–1	Charlton Athletic	Elland Road
19:45	Norris 37'	Report	Dervite 50'	Attendance: 17,484; Referee: N. Miller

27 October 2012	Wolverhampton Wanderers	1–1	Charlton Athletic	Molineux
15:00	Sako 12'	Report	Wilson 58'	Attendance: 22,198; Referee: C. Pawson

3 November 2012	Charlton Athletic	1–4	Middlesbrough	The Valley
15:00	Hulse 12'	Report	Woodgate 27'; McDonald 53'; Ledesma 63'; Smallwood 90'	Attendance: 17,736; Referee: G. Scott

6 November 2012	Charlton Athletic	5–4	Cardiff City	The Valley
19:45	Jackson 39', 45'; Stephens 54'; Haynes 59'; Hulse 65'	Report	Helguson 4'; Mason 24'; Noone 90+'; Gunnarsson 90+'	Attendance: 15,764; Referee: K. Stroud

11 November 2012	Bristol City	0–2	Charlton Athletic	Ashton Gate
15:00		Report	Haynes 20'; Morrison 56'	Attendance: 13,009; Referee: P. Gibbs

17 November 2012	Burnley	0–1	Charlton Athletic	Turf Moor
15:00		Report	Haynes 69'	Attendance: 11,405; Referee: R. Madley

24 November 2012	Charlton Athletic	1–1	Huddersfield Town	The Valley
15:00	Hulse 60'	Report	Clayton 88'	Attendance: 20,012; Referee: L. Collins

27 November 2012	Charlton Athletic	2–0	Peterborough United	The Valley
19:45	Fuller 77'; Kermorgant 85'	Report		Attendance: 17,377; Referee: I. Williamson

1 December 2012	Millwall	0–0	Charlton Athletic	The Den
15:00		Report		Attendance: 18,013; Referee: D. Whitestone

8 December 2012	Charlton Athletic	2–2	Brighton	The Valley
15:00	Wilson 9'; Pritchard 70'	Report	Mackail-Smith 28'; LuaLua 75'	Attendance: 19,018; Referee: D. Sheldrake

15 December 2012	Bolton Wanderers	2–0	Charlton Athletic	Reebok Stadium
15:00	Ngog 74', 80'	Report		Attendance: 15,991; Referee: K. Wright

22 December 2012	Sheffield Wednesday	2–0	Charlton Athletic	Hillsborough
15:00	McCabe 20'; Hélan 90'	Report		Attendance: 20,517; Referee: G. Sutton

26 December 2012	Charlton Athletic	1–2	Ipswich Town	The Valley
13:00	Haynes 72' (pen.)	Report	Campbell 34'; Murphy	Attendance: 18,380; Referee: M. Russell

29 December 2012	Charlton Athletic	1–1	Derby County	The Valley
15:00	Haynes 19'	Report	Ward 72' (pen.)	Attendance: 17,761; Referee: C. Boyeson

1 January 2013	Watford	3–4	Charlton Athletic	Vicarage Road
13:00	Pudil 11'; Abdi 53' (pen.); Geijo 68'	Report	Hoban 34' (o.g.); Kermorgant 37', 70'; Jackson 78'	Attendance: 14,221; Referee: T. Kettle

12 January 2013	Charlton Athletic	2–1	Blackpool	The Valley
15:00	Jackson 23'; Wagstaff 45+1'	Report	Eccleston 90+3'	Attendance: 16,846; Referee: Mike Jones

19 January 2013	Blackburn Rovers	1–2	Charlton Athletic	Ewood Park
15:00	Rhodes 48'	Report	Stephens 26'; Kermorgant 64'	Attendance: 13,647; Referee: D. Coote

26 January 2013	Charlton Athletic	1–2	Sheffield Wednesday	The Valley
15:00	Jackson 47'	Report	Johnson 84'; Lita 89'	Attendance: 20,291; Referee: G. Salisbury

2 February 2013	Crystal Palace	2–1	Charlton Athletic	Selhurst Park
15:00	Murray 75', 79'	Report	Fuller 15'	Attendance: 17,945; Referee: M. Halsey

9 February 2013	Charlton Athletic	1–1	Birmingham City	The Valley
15:00	Kermorgant 88'	Report	Elliott 90'	Attendance: 17,269; Referee: A. D'Urso

16 February 2013	Hull City	1–0	Charlton Athletic	KC Stadium
15:00	Gedo 33'	Report		Attendance: 16,849; Referee: S. Mathieson

19 February 2013	Leicester City	1–2	Charlton Athletic	King Power Stadium
19:45	Wood 69'	Report	Kermorgant 19'; Haynes 78'	Attendance: 19,920; Referee: M. Naylor

23 February 2013	Charlton Athletic	0–2	Nottingham Forest	The Valley
15:00		Report	Majewski 53'; Lansbury 61'	Attendance: 18,697; Referee: A. Madley

2 March 2013	Charlton Athletic	0–1	Burnley	The Valley
15:00		Report	Austin 43'	Attendance: 20,065; Referee: S. Hooper

5 March 2013	Peterborough United	2–2	Charlton Athletic	London Road Stadium
19:45	Swanson 24'; Bostwick 71'	Report	Jackson 55'; Haynes 59'	Attendance: 6,050; Referee: O. Langford

9 March 2013	Huddersfield Town	0–1	Charlton Athletic	John Smith's Stadium
15:00		Report	Harriott 4'	Attendance: 13,591; Referee: K. Stroud

16 March 2013	Charlton Athletic	0–2	Millwall	The Valley
12:30		Report	Easter 58'; Lowry 64'	Attendance: 18,514; Referee: N. Swarbrick

30 March 2013	Charlton Athletic	3–2	Bolton Wanderers	The Valley
15:00	Jackson 25'; Dervite 60'; Kermorgant 63' (pen.)	Report	Sordell 4'; Medo 20'	Attendance: 17,322; Referee: T. Kettle

2 April 2013	Brighton	0–0	Charlton Athletic	Falmer Stadium
19:45		Report		Attendance: 28,043; Referee: M. Russell

6 April 2013	Charlton Athletic	2–1	Leeds United	The Valley
15:00	Jackson 47'; Obika 90'	Report	Varney 81'	Attendance: 18,900; Referee: S. Attwell

13 April 2013	Barnsley	0–6	Charlton Athletic	Oakwell
15:00		Report	Pritchard 4'; Jackson 19'; Kermorgant 48'; Harriott 59'; Kerkar 80'; Fuller 90'	Attendance: 9,469; Referee: G. Eltrigham

16 April 2013	Cardiff City	0–0	Charlton Athletic	Cardiff City Stadium
19:45		Report		Attendance: 26,338; Referee: S. Mathieson

20 April 2013	Charlton Athletic	2–1	Wolverhampton Wanderers	The Valley
15:00	Dervite 63'; Obika 90'	Report	Doyle 66'	Attendance: 19,023; Referee: R. East

27 April 2013	Middlesbrough	2–2	Charlton Athletic	Riverside Stadium
15:00	Emnes 76'; McDonald 87'	Report	Pritchard 1'; Williams 17' (o.g.)	Attendance: 15,011; Referee: D. Drysdale

5 May 2013	Charlton Athletic	4–1	Bristol City	The Valley
12:45	Kermorgant 47', 51'; Obika 79'; Jackson 85'	Report	Reid 59'	Attendance: 18,981; Referee: C. Berry

=== League Cup ===
14 August 2012 First round	Charlton Athletic	1–1 (a.e.t.) (3–4 p)	Leyton Orient	The Valley
19:45	Wagstaff 28'	Report	Baudry 45'	Attendance: 5,914; Referee: G. Ward
	Penalties
	Jackson (penalty missed); Wilson (penalty missed); Green (penalty scored); Wright-Phillips (penalty scored); Pritchard (penalty scored)		(penalty scored) Symes; (penalty scored) Sawyer; (penalty missed) Chorley; (penalty scored) James; (penalty scored) Brunt

=== FA Cup ===
5 January 2013 Third round	Charlton Athletic	0–1	Huddersfield Town	The Valley
15:00		Report	Beckford 11'	Attendance: 6,657; Referee: D. Drysdale

== Transfers ==
=== In ===
Date	Pos.	Name	Previous club	Fee	Ref.
9 July 2012	DF	(England) Lawrie Wilson	(England) Stevenage	Undisclosed	
9 July 2012	FW	(England) Jordan Cook	(England) Sunderland	Free	
1 August 2012	MF	(France) Salim Kerkar	(Scotland) Rangers	Free	
17 August 2012	DF	(France) Dorian Dervite	(Spain) Villarreal B	Free	
21 August 2012	FW	(Jamaica) Ricardo Fuller	(England) Stoke City	Free	
28 August 2012	GK	(England) David Button	(England) Tottenham Hotspur	Undisclosed	
9 November 2012	MF	(England) Courtney Harris	(England) Fulham	Free	
1 January 2013	DF	(Republic of Ireland) Kevin Feely	(Republic of Ireland) Bohemians	Undisclosed	
28 March 2013	MF	(Burkina Faso) Florent Rouamba	(Moldova) FC Sheriff Tiraspol	Undisclosed	

=== Out ===
Date	Pos.	Name	To	Fee	Ref.
2 May 2012	GK	(England) Conor Gough	(England) Bristol Rovers	Free	
10 May 2012	DF	(Republic of Ireland) Gary Doherty	(England) Wycombe Wanderers	Free	
10 May 2012	MF	(Spain) Mikel Alonso	Unattached	Free	
10 May 2012	MF	(England) Freddie Warren	(England) Barnet	Free	
10 May 2012	FW	(England) Tosan Popo	Unattached	Free	
10 May 2012	FW	(Jamaica) Jason Euell (Note: Euell was born in Lambeth, England, and represented them at U-21 level, but also qualified to represent Jamaica internationally through his father and made his international debut for Jamaica in November 2004.)	Retired	Free	
20 August 2012	FW	(England) Paul Hayes	(England) Brentford	Free	
7 January 2013	FW	(England) Leon Clarke	(England) Coventry City	Free	
9 February 2013	FW	(Spain) Ruben Bover	(United States) New York Red Bulls	Undisclosed	

=== Loan in ===
Date	Pos.	Name	From	Date to	Ref.
29 September 2012	MF	(Ivory Coast) Abdul Razak	(England) Manchester City	1 January 2013	
1 October 2012	FW	(England) Rob Hulse	(England) Queens Park Rangers	1 January 2013	
1 October 2012	MF	(England) James Ashton	(England) Chelsea	30 June 2013	
9 November 2012	DF	(England) Danny Seaborne	(England) Southampton	9 December 2012	
9 November 2012	MF	(Iceland) Eggert Jónsson	(England) Wolverhampton Wanderers	9 December 2012	
19 November 2012	MF	(Ghana) Emmanuel Frimpong	(England) Arsenal	1 January 2013	
22 February 2013	MF	(England) Jonathan Obika	(England) Tottenham Hotspur	30 June 2013	
15 March 2013	MF	(England) Mark Gower	(Wales) Swansea City	30 June 2013	

=== Loan out ===
Date	Pos.	Name	To	Date to	Ref.
7 September 2012	FW	(England) Leon Clarke	(England) Scunthorpe United	1 January 2013	
1 October 2012	DF	(England) Yado Mambo	(England) Wimbledon	29 December 2012	
12 October 2012	MF	(England) Scott Wagstaff	(England) Leyton Orient	12 November 2012	
4 November 2012	MF	(England) Michael Smith	(Wales) Newport County	4 December 2012	
9 November 2012	GK	(England) John Sullivan	(England) Colchester United	9 December 2012	
14 November 2012	MF	(England) Danny Hollands	(England) Swindon Town	5 January 2013	
22 November 2012	FW	(England) Ade Azeez	(England) Wycombe Wanderers	1 January 2013	
22 November 2012	FW	(England) Joe Pigott	(England) Bromley	1 January 2013	
22 November 2012	DF	(Nigeria) Semi Ajayi	(England) Dartford	1 January 2013	
1 January 2013	FW	(England) Leon Clarke	(England) Coventry City	6 January 2013	
1 January 2013	DF	(England) Yado Mambo	(England) Shrewsbury Town	30 June 2013	
18 January 2013	FW	(England) Ade Azeez	(England) Leyton Orient	16 February 2013	
19 February 2013	FW	(England) Bradley Wright-Phillips	(England) Brentford	30 June 2013	
7 March 2013	GK	(England) Nick Pope	(England) Cambridge United	6 April 2013	
8 March 2013	GK	(England) John Sullivan	(England) Wimbledon	28 April 2013	
8 March 2013	FW	(England) Michael Smith	(England) Colchester United	6 April 2013	
18 March 2013	FW	(England) Jordan Cook	(England) Yeovil Town	17 April 2013	
