= Tareiq Holmes-Dennis =

English footballer

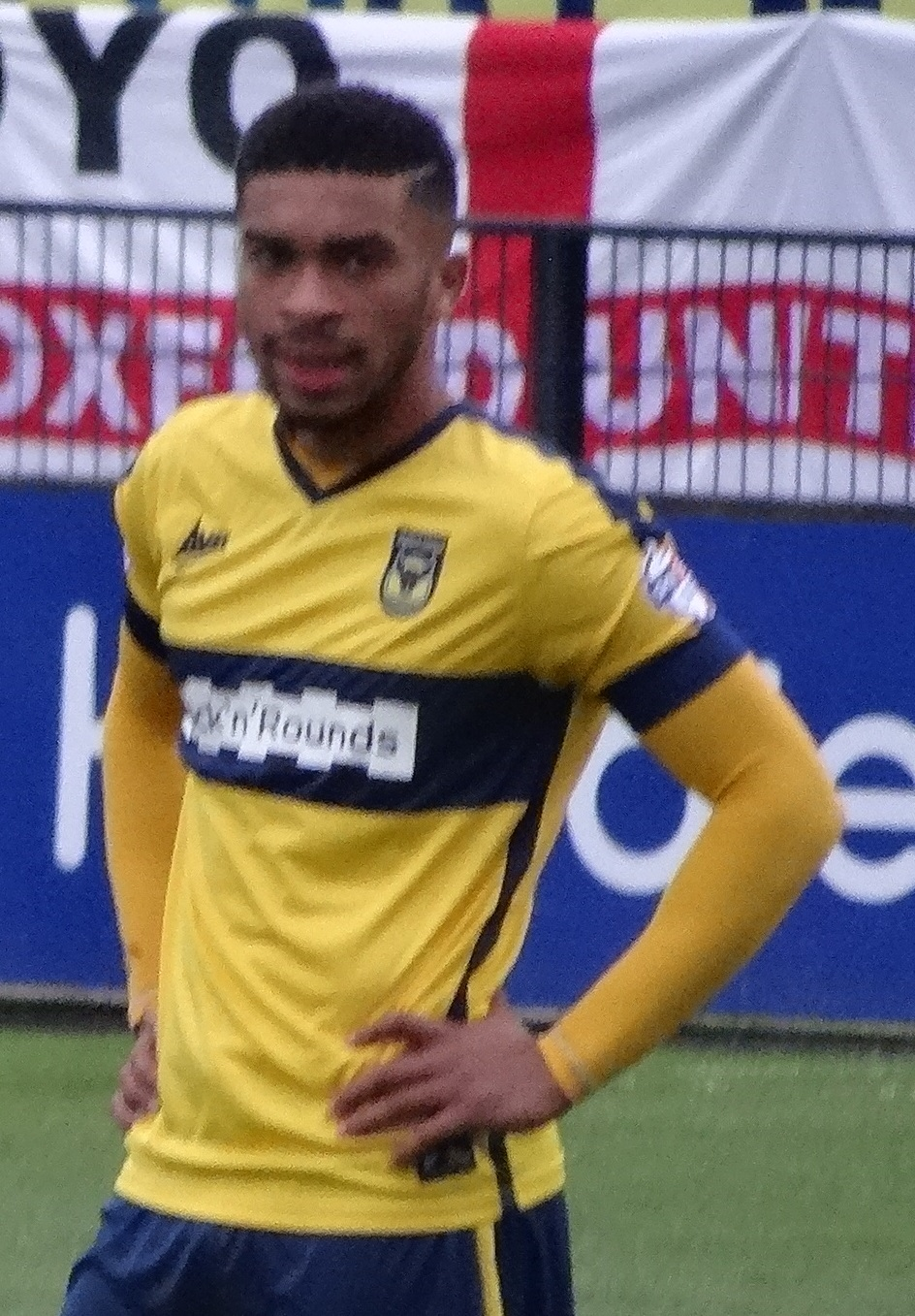
- Holmes-Dennis playing for Oxford United in 2014

Personal information
- Full name: Tareiq Marcus Holmes-Dennis
- Date of birth: 31 October 1995 (age 31)
- Place of birth: Farnborough, London, England
- Height: 5 ft 9 in (1.75 m)
- Position: Defender

Youth career
- –2013: Charlton Athletic

Senior career*
Years	Team	Apps	(Gls)
2013–2016	Charlton Athletic	12	(0)
2014–2015	→ Oxford United (loan)	14	(0)
2015	→ Plymouth Argyle (loan)	17	(1)
2016	→ Oldham Athletic (loan)	10	(0)
2016–2018	Huddersfield Town	9	(0)
2017–2018	→ Portsmouth (loan)	1	(0)
2018–2020	Bristol Rovers	22	(1)
2024	Corinthian-Casuals	5	(0)
Total		90	(2)

International career
2013	England U18	1	(0)
- * Club domestic league appearances and goals as of 18:48, 6 October 2025 (UTC)

Tareiq Marcus Holmes-Dennis (born 31 October 1995) is an English former professional footballer who played as a defender.

== Club career ==
=== Charlton Athletic ===
Born in Farnborough, England, Holmes-Dennis started his football career at Charlton Athletic and progressed through the club's academy ranks. In October 2013, he signed his first professional contract, a three-year deal.

Holmes-Dennis joined Oxford United on loan in October 2014 from Charlton Athletic. Oxford manager Michael Appleton commented: "He'll certainly give us a lot of energy down that left hand side and give us a healthy competition for places." Holmes-Dennis made his Football League debut against Tranmere Rovers at the Kassam Stadium in a 2–0 League Two win on 18 October 2014. His parent club allowed Oxford to select him in the FA Cup. Holmes-Dennis's loan spell with Oxford was extended until 10 January and then extended again until the end of the 2014–15 season. However, Holmes-Dennis was recalled by the club on 2 February 2015.

On 5 February 2015, Plymouth Argyle announced that Holmes-Dennis would join them when the loan window opened the following week, on a loan deal until the end of the season. Holmes-Dennis made his Argyle debut, playing as a left-back, in a 2–0 win over Wycombe Wanderers on 10 February 2015, and scored his first Plymouth Argyle goal (also his first professional goal) in a 3–2 win over Tranmere Rovers on 25 April 2015. Following this, Holmes-Dennis remained at Plymouth for the club's play-off campaign and featured in both matches, as Argyle lost to Wycombe Wanderers. Holmes-Dennis returned to his parent club having made seventeen appearances.

On 18 March 2016, Holmes-Dennis joined League One club Oldham Athletic on loan for the remainder of the 2015–16 season.

=== Huddersfield Town ===
On 24 August 2016, Holmes-Dennis joined Football League Championship side Huddersfield Town on a three-year deal.

==== Portsmouth (loan) ====
After a season of sporadic appearances for Huddersfield, which ended in the Terriers achieving promotion to the Premier League, Holmes-Dennis joined Portsmouth on a season-long loan deal, Portsmouth having just returned to League One after a four-year absence. Holmes-Dennis started the first game of the season, at home to Rochdale, at left-back; unfortunately he suffered an injury after just 39 minutes of his competitive debut and had to be substituted.

=== Bristol Rovers ===
On 23 July 2018, Holmes-Dennis joined Bristol Rovers for an undisclosed fee, where he met up with his new teammates at their training camp in Holland. He made his first start for the club in a 2–1 away defeat to Sunderland and scored his first goal for the club on Boxing Day in a 3–1 victory over Walsall.

Following his release at the end of the 2019–20 season, Holmes-Dennis announced his retirement in October 2020 due to his recurring knee injury aged just 24.

=== Return to playing ===
In September 2024, Holmes-Dennis returned to playing, joining Combined Counties Premier Division South club Corinthian-Casuals.

== International career ==
In mid-2013, Holmes-Dennis was called up to the England U18 squad, alongside Tobi Sho-Silva. He made his England's debut on 6 March 2013, alongside Sho-Silva, in a 1–0 defeat to Belgium U18.

== Career statistics ==
As of end of 2024-25 season

Appearances and goals by club, season and competition
Club	Season	League			FA Cup		League Cup		Other		Total	
Club	Season	Division	Apps	Goals	Apps	Goals	Apps	Goals	Apps	Goals	Apps	Goals
Charlton Athletic	2014–15	Championship	0	0	0	0	0	0	0	0	0	0
Charlton Athletic	2015–16	Championship	11	0	0	0	1	0	0	0	12	0
Charlton Athletic	2016–17	League One	1	0	0	0	1	0	0	0	2	0
Charlton Athletic	Charlton Athletic total		12	0	0	0	2	0	0	0	14	0
Oxford United (loan)	2014–15	League Two	14	0	3	0	0	0	0	0	17	0
Plymouth Argyle (loan)	2014–15	League Two	17	1	0	0	0	0	2 (Note: Appearances in the League Two play-offs)	0	19	1
Oldham Athletic (loan)	2015–16	League One	10	0	0	0	0	0	0	0	10	0
Huddersfield Town	2016–17	Championship	9	0	4	0	0	0	2 (Note: Appearances in the Championship play-offs)	0	15	0
Portsmouth (loan)	2017–18	League One	1	0	0	0	0	0	0	0	1	0
Bristol Rovers	2018–19	League One	18	1	0	0	0	0	3 (Note: Appearances in the EFL Trophy)	0	21	1
Bristol Rovers	2019–20	League One	4	0	2	0	0	0	3	0	3	0
Bristol Rovers	Bristol Rovers total		22	1	2	0	0	0	6	0	30	1
Corinthian-Casuals	2024–25	Combined Counties League; Premier Division South	5	0	0	0	—		1 (Note: Appearance(s) in London Senior Cup)	0	6	0
Career total			90	2	9	0	2	0	12	0	113	2

== Honours ==
Huddersfield Town

- EFL Championship play-offs: 2017
