= Lawrie Wilson =

English footballer (born 1987)

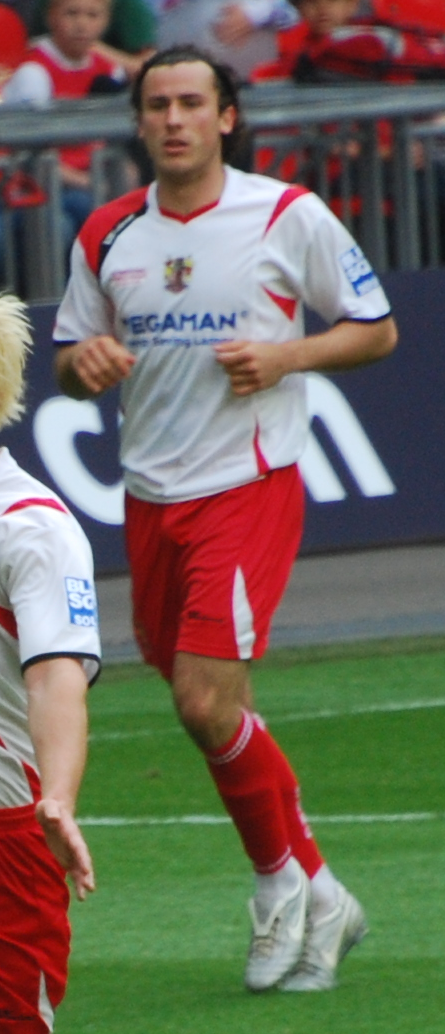
- Wilson playing for Stevenage Borough in the 2009 FA Trophy final

Personal information
- Full name: Lawrie Robert Wilson
- Date of birth: 11 September 1987 (age 39)
- Place of birth: Collier Row, England
- Height: 5 ft 10 in (1.78 m)
- Positions: Right-back; midfielder

Youth career
- 2004–2006: Charlton Athletic

Senior career*
Years	Team	Apps	(Gls)
2006–2007	Colchester United	0	(0)
2006–2007	→ Welling United (loan)	3	(0)
2007–2012	Stevenage	159	(13)
2012–2015	Charlton Athletic	96	(4)
2015	→ Rotherham United (loan)	3	(0)
2015–2017	Bolton Wanderers	30	(2)
2016	→ Peterborough United (loan)	2	(0)
2017–2018	Port Vale	7	(0)
2018–2020	Ebbsfleet United	68	(0)
2018	→ Maidstone United (loan)	4	(0)
2020–2023	Billericay Town	29	(0)
Total		401	(19)
- * Club domestic league appearances and goals

Lawrie Robert Wilson (born 11 September 1987) is an English former professional footballer who played as a right-back.

Wilson began his career at Charlton Athletic, playing regularly for the club's under-18 and reserve teams before being released in 2006. He joined Colchester United ahead of the 2006–07 season but did not make a first-team appearance, instead spending a one-month loan at Welling United of the Conference South. In August 2007, he signed for Stevenage, making 190 appearances over five seasons. He helped the club win the FA Trophy in May 2009 and achieve back-to-back promotions from the Conference Premier into League One.

He returned to Charlton Athletic in July 2012, making 96 Championship appearances across three seasons, before signing for Bolton Wanderers in August 2015. Wilson spent time on loan at Peterborough United before contributing to Bolton's immediate promotion back to the Championship during the 2016–17 season. He joined Port Vale in July 2017, transferred to Ebbsfleet United six months later, and was loaned to Maidstone United in September 2018. He concluded his playing career at National League South club Billericay Town, where he transitioned into coaching.

== Club career ==
=== Early career ===
Wilson began his career as a trainee with Charlton Athletic. He was a regular in the club's under-18 team, where he played in defence. He progressed through the club's youth system, and played in Charlton's reserve team throughout the club's 2005–06 season, making 16 appearances for the reserves as a second-year scholar. However, he did not make any first-team appearances and was subsequently allowed to search for a new club. In February 2006, he played for Luton Town's reserve team in a match against Stevenage Borough reserves at Kenilworth Road, although no transfer ultimately materialised. He was released by Charlton in April 2006.

A month later, Wilson went on trial at League Two club Shrewsbury Town and played the whole match in Shrewsbury's 2–1 pre-season friendly home victory against Rotherham United. He was unsuccessful in his attempt to earn a professional contract with the club. In August 2006, Wilson signed a one-year contract with Colchester United. Similar to his time at Charlton, Wilson played regularly for the club's reserve team throughout the 2006–07 season, but did not make any first-team appearances. He was loaned to Conference South club Welling United in December 2006. He made his debut for Welling in the club's 1–0 away win at Cambridge City but was sent off after 27 minutes for violent conduct. He returned to the first team in Welling's 0–0 draw with Basingstoke Town at Park View Road in the FA Trophy, and went on to play four times for Welling during his one-month loan spell at the club. On returning to Layer Road, Wilson was released at the end of the 2006–07 season, without making a first-team appearance for Colchester. Ahead of the 2007–08 season, Wilson spent pre-season trialling at Brentford and Stockport County respectively, training with Stockport for several weeks and playing in several pre-season friendlies, but was ultimately not offered a contract.

=== Stevenage ===
Wilson signed for Stevenage of the Conference Premier on 16 August 2007, joining on a one-year contract. Manager Mark Stimson gave Wilson his Stevenage debut the day after signing for the club, coming on as an 86th-minute substitute in Stevenage's 3–0 victory against Weymouth on 17 August 2007. Wilson made 27 appearances during his first season at Stevenage, with the majority of his appearances coming in the second half of the 2007–08 season. The following season under the new management of Graham Westley, Wilson played regularly in both the full-back position and at right midfield. Wilson scored his first professional goal in Stevenage's 3–1 away win at Barrow on 30 August 2008, capitalising on a goalkeeping error in the 75th minute of the match to secure Stevenage's first victory of the 2008–09 season. Wilson played in both of Stevenage's Conference Premier play-off matches against Cambridge United, as the club lost 4–3 on aggregate. He played in four different positions in six of Stevenage's FA Trophy fixtures that season and was deployed at left midfield in Stevenage's 2–0 victory against York City in the final at Wembley Stadium on 9 May 2009.

Wilson started in Stevenage's opening game of the 2009–10 season in a 1–1 draw against Tamworth, adopting an attacking role on the right wing. He scored his first goal of the season in a 3–0 victory over Ebbsfleet United on 18 August 2009. Two weeks later, in Stevenage's 2–1 victory against Rushden & Diamonds, Wilson sustained a "career-threatening injury" following a tackle from Michael Corcoran, resulting in a dislocated ankle and broken leg in three places. He underwent successful surgery the following day and was expected to miss the remainder of the 2009–10 season. Wilson returned earlier than anticipated, playing in a reserve match against Ipswich Town in March 2010, and made his first-team return a week later against Luton Town, coming on as a 65th-minute substitute. Two days afterwards, Wilson started his first match in over eight months against AFC Wimbledon, scoring Stevenage's second goal with a half-volley from Joel Byrom's chipped pass in Stevenage's 3–0 victory at Kingsmeadow. He also played in the club's 2–0 win against Kidderminster Harriers at Aggborough in April 2010, the match that secured Stevenage's place in Football League for the first time in the club's history. Wilson made 13 appearances during the season, scoring twice. At the end of the season, he signed a contract extension to remain at the club until July 2011.

Wilson featured in Stevenage's first match of the 2010–11 season, playing 72 minutes in the club's 2–2 draw with Macclesfield Town. He signed a new contract with the club on 24 September 2010, which kept him at Stevenage until 2012. He scored his first goal of the 2010–11 season in Stevenage's 2–2 draw against Accrington Stanley on 5 February 2011. A month later, Wilson scored both of Stevenage's goals in a 2–1 home victory over Lincoln City on 19 March 2011, his second goal coming from 25 yards (23 m) out following an interchange with John Mousinho. He scored five goals in 50 appearances during the 2010–11 season, as Stevenage earned promotion to League One for the first time in their history.

Wilson was part of the starting eleven in Stevenage's first League One fixture of the 2011–12 season, playing the full match in a 0–0 home draw with Exeter City. He signed a contract extension with the club on 19 August 2011. Wilson scored his first goal of the 2011–12 season in a 5–1 home victory against Sheffield Wednesday, scoring Stevenage's fourth goal of the match just before half-time. Wilson scored six times during the season, and was ever-present under both Westley and new manager Gary Smith, appearing in all 56 of the club's matches as Stevenage lost in the play-off semi-finals.

=== Charlton Athletic ===
Wilson was linked with a transfer to Peterborough United during the summer of 2012, as well as to Charlton Athletic. Stevenage confirmed that they had received two bids for the player, both from Championship clubs. Wilson signed for Charlton on 9 July 2012, the club at which he began his footballing career, for an undisclosed fee. He debuted for Charlton in the club's opening game of the 2012–13 season, a 1–1 draw with Leyton Orient in the League Cup at The Valley on 14 August 2012, which Charlton subsequently lost 4–3 on penalties after extra time. Wilson scored his first goal for the club in his 10th league appearance, scoring from close range to restore parity in a 1–1 draw with Wolverhampton Wanderers at Molineux on 27 October 2012. After a month out of first-team action, Wilson returned for Charlton's 2–2 home draw with Brighton & Hove Albion on 8 December 2012, scoring the first goal of the match with a header from Dale Stephens' cross. It proved to be Wilson's last goal of the season, in which he made 32 appearances as Charlton finished ninth in the Championship, three points behind the final play-off place.

He made 49 appearances during the 2013–14 season as Charlton finished 18th under new manager José Riga. He competed with Chris Solly and Joe Gomez for a place in the team at the start of the 2014–15 season. Wilson joined Championship rivals Rotherham United on an emergency loan on 20 March 2015. Rotherham manager Steve Evans suggested that the loan would enable him to assess whether to pursue a permanent deal for Wilson in the summer. He made three appearances during his loan spell at Rotherham.

=== Bolton Wanderers ===
Wilson signed for Bolton Wanderers on 5 August 2015, agreeing a two-year contract with the Championship club. Initially the club's first-choice right-back, he was not selected by manager Neil Lennon following a poor performance in a 4–1 defeat at Huddersfield Town on 19 September 2015. He joined League One club Peterborough United on 2 January 2016, on a one-month loan agreement. Wilson stated that reuniting with former Stevenage manager Graham Westley was a factor in his decision to move to London Road Stadium. He made four appearances during the loan spell. He returned to Bolton and was recalled to the first team by interim manager Jimmy Phillips for the final two games of the 2015–16 season.

Wilson regained his place in the first team at Bolton following an injury to Lewis Buxton in September 2016, and subsequently established himself as the club's right-back under manager Phil Parkinson. He was ruled out of first-team action for 10 weeks due to a hamstring injury sustained during a 1–1 draw at Milton Keynes Dons on 4 February 2017. Bolton secured promotion at the end of the 2016–17 season, although Wilson was released following the club's decision not to offer him a new contract.

=== Port Vale ===
Following his departure from Bolton, Wilson signed a two-year contract with newly relegated League Two club Port Vale on 15 July 2017, after manager Michael Brown sought a replacement for departing right-back and club captain Ben Purkiss. He was not included in the first team under new manager Neil Aspin and remained outside the matchday squad despite suspensions to James Gibbons and injuries to Adam Yates and Joe Davis.

=== Ebbsfleet United ===
Having not played for Port Vale in over three months, Wilson joined National League club Ebbsfleet United on 9 January 2018. He was signed by manager Daryl McMahon, his former teammate at Stevenage. He made his debut for Ebbsfleet on the same day his signing was announced, playing the entirety of a 2–1 victory at Maidstone United. He made 17 appearances for the club during the second half of the season, including two appearances in the National League play-offs, as Ebbsfleet lost at the semi-final stage.

Wilson made two appearances for Ebbsfleet in the opening two months of the 2018–19 season. He subsequently joined fellow National League club Maidstone United on a one-month loan in order to gain match fitness and playing time. He made his debut for Maidstone in a 1–0 away victory at Aldershot Town on 25 September 2018, making four appearances during the loan spell. Wilson returned to Ebbsfleet following the conclusion of his loan agreement and made 28 appearances over the course of the season. He made 21 appearances for Ebbsfleet during the 2019–20 season, which was permanently suspended on 26 March 2020 due to the COVID-19 pandemic in England, with Ebbsfleet positioned in the relegation zone in 21st place. Wilson departed the club on 29 June 2020, upon the expiry of his contract.

=== Billericay Town ===
Wilson joined National League South club Billericay Town on 4 August 2020. He made 14 appearances before the 2020–21 season was curtailed due to restrictions associated with the COVID-19 pandemic. Manager Kevin Watson was dismissed in October 2021, and, as club captain, Wilson was tasked with assisting caretaker manager Danny Brown in preparing the team for future fixtures. Wilson made 15 appearances as Billericay were relegated after finishing in last place at the end of the 2021–22 season. Brown remained in post as manager, and in May 2022 stated that Wilson would combine playing duties with coaching responsibilities at the club. He made six appearances in all competitions during the 2022–23 season.

== International career ==
Wilson received a call-up to play for the England C team on 27 August 2009, who represent England at non-League level, for an international fixture against Hungary C in Budapest. However, he withdrew from the squad after sustaining a dislocated ankle and broken leg three days later.

== Style of play ==
Wilson is primarily a right-back, but is also adept at playing on the right side of midfield, and can also play at left-back, central midfield or the left-hand side of midfield when required. He described himself as a consistent rather than standout performer.

== Career statistics ==
Appearances and goals by club, season and competition
Club	Season	League			FA Cup		League Cup		Other		Total	
Club	Season	Division	Apps	Goals	Apps	Goals	Apps	Goals	Apps	Goals	Apps	Goals
Colchester United	2006–07	Championship	0	0	0	0	0	0	—		0	0
Welling United (loan)	2006–07	Conference South	3	0	0	0	—		1 (Note: Appearance(s) in FA Trophy)	0	4	0
Stevenage	2007–08	Conference Premier	24	0	3	0	—		0	0	27	0
Stevenage	2008–09	Conference Premier	35	1	2	0	—		10 (Note: Two appearances and one goal in Conference League Cup; six appearances in FA Trophy; two appearances in 2009 Conference Premier play-offs)	1	47	2
Stevenage	2009–10	Conference Premier	12	2	0	0	—		1	0	13	2
Stevenage	2010–11	League Two	42	5	5	0	0	0	3 (Note: Appearances in 2011 League Two play-offs)	0	50	5
Stevenage	2011–12	League One	46	5	6	0	1	0	3 (Note: One appearance in Football League Trophy; two appearances in 2012 League One play-offs)	1	56	6
Stevenage	Total		159	13	16	0	1	0	17	2	193	15
Charlton Athletic	2012–13	Championship	30	2	1	0	1	0	—		32	2
Charlton Athletic	2013–14	Championship	42	2	5	0	2	0	—		49	2
Charlton Athletic	2014–15	Championship	24	0	1	0	2	2	—		27	2
Charlton Athletic	Total		96	4	7	0	5	2	0	0	108	6
Rotherham United (loan)	2014–15	Championship	3	0	—		—		—		3	0
Bolton Wanderers	2015–16	Championship	12	1	0	0	1	0	—		13	1
Bolton Wanderers	2016–17	League One	18	1	4	0	1	0	3 (Note: Appearance(s) in EFL Trophy)	0	26	1
Bolton Wanderers	Total		30	2	4	0	2	0	3	0	39	2
Peterborough United (loan)	2015–16	League One	2	0	2	0	—		—		4	0
Port Vale	2017–18	League Two	7	0	0	0	0	0	1	0	8	0
Ebbsfleet United	2017–18	National League	13	0	0	0	—		4 (Note: Two appearances in FA Trophy; two appearances in 2018 National League play-offs)	0	17	0
Ebbsfleet United	2018–19	National League	27	0	1	0	—		1	0	29	0
Ebbsfleet United	2019–20	National League	28	0	1	0	—		3	0	32	0
Ebbsfleet United	Total		68	0	2	0	0	0	8	0	78	0
Maidstone United (loan)	2018–19	National League	4	0	0	0	—		0	0	4	0
Billericay Town	2020–21	National League South	13	0	0	0	—		1	0	14	0
Billericay Town	2021–22	National League South	13	0	1	0	—		1	0	15	0
Billericay Town	2022–23	Isthmian League; Premier Division	3	0	1	0	—		2 (Note: One appearance in Alan Turvey Trophy; one appearance in Essex Senior Cup)	0	6	0
Billericay Town	Total		29	0	2	0	0	0	4	0	35	0
Career total			401	19	33	0	8	2	34	2	476	23

== Honours ==
Stevenage

- Football League Two play-offs: 2011
- Conference Premier: 2009–10
- FA Trophy: 2008–09; runner-up: 2009–10

Bolton Wanderers

- EFL League One second-place promotion: 2016–17
