= Scott Wagstaff =

English footballer (born 1990)

Personal information
- Full name: Scott Andrew Wagstaff
- Date of birth: 31 March 1990 (age 36)
- Place of birth: Maidstone, England
- Position: Midfielder

Team information
- Current team: Dartford
- Number: 8

Youth career
- 1998–2008: Charlton Athletic

Senior career*
Years	Team	Apps	(Gls)
2008–2013	Charlton Athletic	118	(17)
2008	→ Bournemouth (loan)	5	(0)
2008	→ Northwich Victoria (loan)	5	(1)
2012	→ Leyton Orient (loan)	7	(0)
2013–2016	Bristol City	72	(8)
2016–2018	Gillingham	57	(1)
2018–2020	AFC Wimbledon	61	(3)
2020–2021	Forest Green Rovers	33	(1)
2021–2022	Aldershot Town	8	(0)
2022	Bromley	10	(1)
2022–2026	Tonbridge Angels	128	(3)
2026–	Dartford	12	(0)

Managerial career
- 2025: Tonbridge Angels (caretaker)
- * Club domestic league appearances and goals as of 17:10, 21 November 2026 (UTC)

Scott Andrew Wagstaff (born 31 March 1990) is an English footballer who plays as a midfielder for Dartford and is also the youth team manager for Gillingham.

== Early life ==
Wagstaff was born in Maidstone, and attended Bennett Memorial Diocesan School in Tunbridge Wells.

== Career ==
=== Charlton Athletic ===
Wagstaff joined Charlton Athletic at the age of 8 after being spotted at a Charlton Athletic Community course. . He then captained Charlton's Under 18s on their run to the FA Youth Cup quarter finals. He made his debut in April 2008 against Barnsley, in the same match as Jonjo Shelvey made his debut. In the same season he was named as the club's young player of the year. Wagstaff joined Bournemouth on a month's loan in August 2008 and to Northwich Victoria for a month in November 2008. In December 2008 he was given a 2 1/2-year professional contract by Charlton manager Alan Pardew.

Wagstaff scored his first goal for Charlton in a league game against Walsall on 22 August 2009.

He was released by Charlton at the end of the 2012–13 season.

=== Bristol City ===
On 8 July 2013, Wagstaff signed for Bristol City on a three-year deal. He made his debut for Bristol City in a 2–2 draw against Bradford City, and scored in that game.

On 27 June 2016 Bristol City confirmed that Wagstaff would be leaving the club in search of first-team football.

=== Gillingham ===
He joined League One side Gillingham on a two-year deal on 7 July 2016. He scored his first goal for Gillingham in a 3–3 draw with Chesterfield on 27 September 2016.

He was released by Gillingham at the end of the 2017–18 season.

=== AFC Wimbledon ===
On 11 July 2018 it was announced the Wagstaff had signed with League One side AFC Wimbledon. On 26 January, Wagstaff scored two goals in AFC Wimbledon's FA Cup 4th Round defeat of West Ham United at Kingsmeadow.

Wagstaff was released by the club at the conclusion of the 2019–20 season, having made 72 appearances in all competitions and scoring 6 goals.

=== Forest Green Rovers ===
On 26 August 2020, Wagstaff joined Forest Green Rovers on a one-year deal.

On 24 May 2021, it was announced that Wagstaff would leave Forest Green Rovers at the end of the 2020–21 season.

=== Aldershot Town ===
On 7 October 2021, Wagstaff joined Aldershot Town for the 2021–22 season.

=== Bromley ===
On 7 January 2022, Wagstaff signed for National League side Bromley.

On 31 May 2022, it was confirmed that Wagstaff would leave Bromley following the end of his contract.

=== Tonbridge Angels ===
On 2 October 2022, Wagstaff signed for National League South side Tonbridge Angels.

=== Dartford ===
On 20 May 2026, Wagstaff signed for Isthmian Premier League side Dartford.

== Coaching and managerial career ==
=== Tonbridge Angels (caretaker) ===
On 31 March 2025, Wagstaff was named caretaker manager of Tonbridge Angels following the departure of former manager Jay Saunders.

=== Gillingham Youth Team ===
On 3 March 2026, it was announced that Wagstaff had been appointed as the new youth team manager at Gillingham, following the departure of Joe Dunne.

== Career statistics ==
=== As a player ===
As of match played 21 November 2026

Appearances and goals by club, season and competition
Season	Club	League			FA Cup		League Cup		Other		Total	
Season	Club	Division	Apps	Goals	Apps	Goals	Apps	Goals	Apps	Goals	Apps	Goals
Charlton Athletic	2007–08	Championship	2	0	0	0	0	0	–		2	0
Charlton Athletic	2008–09	Championship	2	0	1	0	1	0	–		4	0
Charlton Athletic	2009–10	League One	31	4	1	0	1	0	4 (Note: Two appearances and one goal in EFL Trophy, two appearances in League One play-offs)	1	37	5
Charlton Athletic	2010–11	League One	40	8	5	1	1	0	3 (Note: Appearance(s) in EFL Trophy)	1	49	10
Charlton Athletic	2011–12	League One	34	4	3	0	2	0	1	0	40	4
Charlton Athletic	2012–13	Championship	9	1	0	0	1	1	–		10	2
Charlton Athletic	Total		118	17	10	1	6	1	8	2	142	21
Bournemouth (loan)	2008–09	League Two	5	0	0	0	0	0	1	0	6	0
Northwich Victoria (loan)	2008–09	Conference National	5	1	0	0	–		–		5	1
Leyton Orient (loan)	2012–13	League One	7	0	0	0	0	0	–		7	0
Bristol City	2013–14	League One	37	5	4	0	2	1	2	0	45	6
Bristol City	2014–15	League One	26	2	4	0	1	0	4	0	35	2
Bristol City	2015–16	Championship	9	1	1	0	0	0	–		10	1
Bristol City	Total		72	8	9	0	3	1	6	0	90	9
Gillingham	2016–17	League One	26	1	1	1	1	0	0	0	28	2
Gillingham	2017–18	League One	31	0	3	1	1	0	3	1	38	2
Gillingham	Total		57	1	4	2	2	0	3	1	66	4
AFC Wimbledon	2018–19	League One	35	2	3	2	2	0	2	0	42	4
AFC Wimbledon	2019–20	League One	26	1	2	0	1	1	1	0	30	2
AFC Wimbledon	Total		61	3	5	2	3	1	3	0	72	6
Forest Green Rovers	2020–21	League Two	33	1	0	0	0	0	4 (Note: Two appearances in EFL Trophy, two appearances in League Two play-offs)	0	37	1
Aldershot Town	2021–22	National League	8	0	1	0	–		1 (Note: Appearance in FA Trophy)	0	10	0
Bromley	2021–22	National League	10	1	–		–		–		10	1
Tonbridge Angels	2022–23	National League South	34	1	0	0	–		1	0	35	1
Tonbridge Angels	2023–24	National League South	37	1	1	0	–		1	0	39	1
Tonbridge Angels	2024–25	National League South	29	0	1	0	–		1	0	31	0
Tonbridge Angels	2025–26	National League South	28	1	3	0	–		0	0	31	0
Tonbridge Angels	Total		128	3	5	0	0	0	3	0	136	2
Dartford	2026–27	Isthmian Premier League	12	0	4	0	–		3 (Note: One appearance in Kent Senior Cup, one appearance in the FA Trophy and one appearance in the Velocity Cup)	0	19	0
Career total			516	35	38	5	14	3	32	3	600	46

=== As a manager ===
As of match played 26 April 2025

Managerial record by team and tenure
Team	From	To	Record				
Team	From	To	P	W	D	L	Win %
Tonbridge Angels (caretaker)	31 March 2025	26 April 2025	5	0	1	4	0.00
Total			5	0	1	4	0.00

== Honours ==
Charlton Athletic

- Football League One: 2011–12

Bristol City

- Football League One: 2014–15
- Football League Trophy: 2014–15
