= Chris Solly =

English footballer

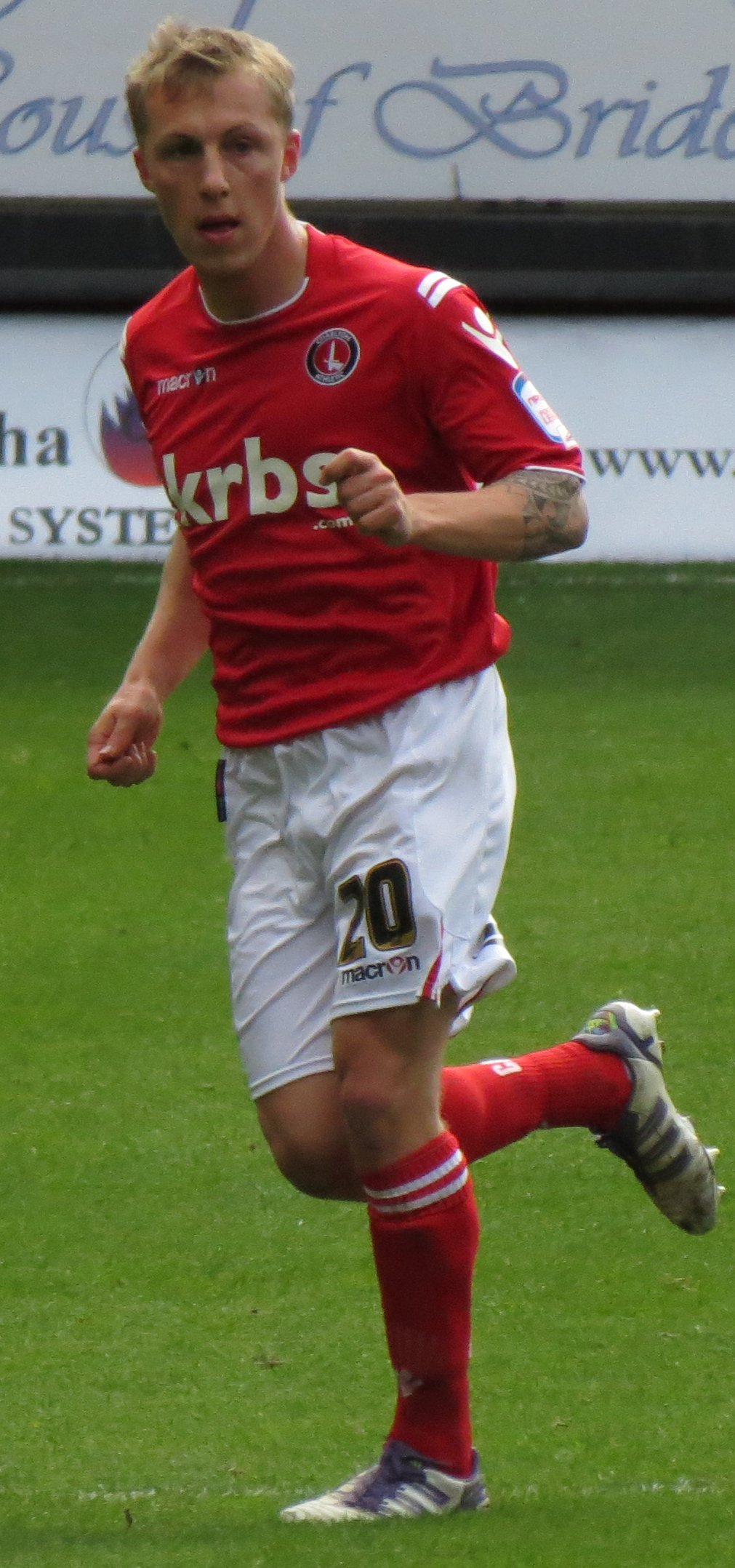
- Solly playing for Charlton Athletic in 2012

Personal information
- Full name: Christopher James Solly
- Date of birth: 20 January 1991 (age 35)
- Place of birth: Rochester, England
- Height: 5 ft 8 in (1.73 m)
- Position: Right back

Team information
- Current team: Charlton Athletic (professional development phase coach)

Youth career
- –2009: Charlton Athletic

Senior career*
Years	Team	Apps	(Gls)
2009–2020	Charlton Athletic	301	(3)
2020–2024	Ebbsfleet United	93	(2)
Total		394	(5)

International career
2006–2007	England U16	6	(0)
2007–2008	England U17	9	(0)
- * Club domestic league appearances and goals as of 17:10, 29 April 2024 (UTC)

Christopher James Solly (born 20 January 1991) is an English former professional footballer who played as a right back. He is currently professional development phase coach at Charlton Athletic.

== Career ==
=== Charlton Athletic ===
Solly was born in Rochester, Kent. On 3 May 2009, he made his debut for Charlton Athletic, coming on as a first-half substitute for the injured Darren Ward in a 4–2 victory over Norwich City. Solly made his full debut for the 1st team in the Football League Trophy against Barnet on 6 October 2009. He scored his first goal for the club after coming on as a substitute in the 3–1 win over Leyton Orient on 13 August 2010. Due to the uncertainty over the future of Carl Jenkinson, Solly established himself as first choice right back towards the end of the 2010–11 season.

Despite the arrival of Andy Hughes, he continued to keep his place in the side the following season. Following an impressive 2011–12 season, Solly was voted Charlton's Player of the Year by supporters and selected as Young Player of the Year by the club's management team. He became the first Charlton player to win both awards in the same season since defender Richard Rufus in 1995.

Solly continued his impressive form into the 2012–13 season as Charlton finished 9th in their first season back in the Championship. Solly capped a fine season by winning the Charlton Player of the year award for a second year running.

Despite reported summer interest from Premier League clubs, Solly secured his future to Charlton by signing a new four-year deal in September of the 2013–14 season.

On 1 June 2020, Charlton manager Lee Bowyer accused Solly of refusing to play for the club ahead of the resumption of the 2019–20 EFL Championship season, following the suspension of the season due to the COVID-19 pandemic in the United Kingdom.

On 2 July 2020, it was confirmed that Solly had left Charlton after his contract expired.

=== Ebbsfleet United ===
On 11 December 2020, Solly joined National League South side Ebbsfleet United. Solly made his debut for Ebbsfleet United on 13 January 2021 in a 2–1 victory over Concord Rangers.

On 18 March 2021, it was confirmed that Solly would remain at Ebbsfleet United for the 2021–22 National League South season. As part of his new deal, Solly would also take on a first-team coaching role.

Solly was awarded the National League South Player of the Month award for September 2022 after captaining the side to top of the league.

On 26 April 2024, Ebbsfleet United confirmed that Solly would leave the club when his contract expired.

On 29 April 2024, Solly announced his retirement from playing on social media. In his statement Solly said, "making this decision for any player can never come easy but this is my time now to say goodbye to my footballing playing days".

== Coaching career ==
In July 2024, Solly returned to Charlton Athletic as a Professional Development Phase coach.

== Career statistics ==
As of match played 6 January 2024

Appearances and goals by club, season and competition
Club	Season	League			FA Cup		League Cup		Other		Total	
Club	Season	Division	Apps	Goals	Apps	Goals	Apps	Goals	Apps	Goals	Apps	Goals
Charlton Athletic	2008–09	Championship	1	0	0	0	0	0	—		1	0
Charlton Athletic	2009–10	League One	8	0	0	0	1	0	1 (Note: One appearance in Football League Trophy)	0	10	0
Charlton Athletic	2010–11	League One	14	1	0	0	1	0	0	0	15	1
Charlton Athletic	2011–12	League One	44	0	3	0	1	0	0	0	48	0
Charlton Athletic	2012–13	Championship	45	1	0	0	0	0	—		45	1
Charlton Athletic	2013–14	Championship	12	0	0	0	0	0	—		12	0
Charlton Athletic	2014–15	Championship	38	0	0	0	0	0	—		38	0
Charlton Athletic	2015–16	Championship	34	0	0	0	1	0	—		35	0
Charlton Athletic	2016–17	League One	27	0	0	0	0	0	1 (Note: One appearance in EFL Trophy)	0	28	0
Charlton Athletic	2017–18	League One	27	0	1	0	0	0	0	0	28	0
Charlton Athletic	2018–19	League One	37	1	0	0	0	0	1 (Note: One appearance in the League One play-offs)	0	38	1
Charlton Athletic	2019–20	Championship	14	0	1	0	0	0	—		15	0
Charlton Athletic	Charlton Athletic total		301	3	5	0	4	0	3	0	313	3
Ebbsfleet United	2020–21	National League South	5	0	—		—		—		5	0
Ebbsfleet United	2021–22	National League South	38	1	2	1	—		2 (Note: Two appearances in the National League South play-offs)	0	42	2
Ebbsfleet United	2022–23	National League South	36	1	3	0	—		0	0	39	1
Ebbsfleet United	2023–24	National League	14	0	0	0	—		0	0	14	0
Ebbsfleet United	Ebbsfleet United total		93	2	5	1	0	0	2	0	100	3
Career total			394	5	10	1	4	0	5	0	413	6

== Honours ==
Charlton Athletic

- Football League One: 2011–12
- EFL League One play-offs: 2019

Ebbsfleet United

- National League South: 2022–23

Individual

- Charlton Athletic Player of the Year: 2011–12, 2012–13
- Charlton Athletic Young Player of the Year: 2011–12
- National League South Player of the Month: September 2022
