= 2014–15 Charlton Athletic F.C. season =

Charlton Athletic F.C.
2014–15 season
- Chairman: Roland Duchâtelet
- Manager: Bob Peeters (until 11 January 2015); Guy Luzon (from 13 January 2015)
- Stadium: The Valley
- Championship: 12th
- FA Cup: Third round (eliminated by Blackburn Rovers)
- League Cup: Second round (eliminated by Derby County)
- Top goalscorer: League: Igor Vetokele (11); All: Jóhann Berg Guðmundsson, Igor Vetokele (11)
- Highest home attendance: 25,545 (vs. Huddersfield Town, 28 February 2015)
- Lowest home attendance: 5,752 (vs. Colchester United, 12 August 2014)
- Average home league attendance: 16,708
Home colours	Away colours	Third colours

The 2014–15 season was Charlton Athletic's third consecutive season in The Football League Championship, the second tier of the English football league system. Along with competing in the Championship, the club also participated in the FA Cup and League Cup. The season covered the period from 1 July 2014 to 30 June 2015.

== Kit ==
Sportswear giants Nike were Kit suppliers, with the University of Greenwich being the front of shirt sponsor.

== Squad statistics ==
=== Appearances and goals ===
As of 2 May 2015

No.	Pos	Nat	Player	Total		Championship		FA Cup		League Cup	
No.	Pos	Nat	Player	Apps	Goals	Apps	Goals	Apps	Goals	Apps	Goals
1	GK	(Republic of Ireland) IRL	Stephen Henderson	32	0	31	0	0	0	1	0
2	DF	(England) ENG	Lawrie Wilson	27	2	10+14	0	1	0	2	2
3	DF	(England) ENG	Joe Gomez	24	0	16+5	0	0+1	0	2	0
4	MF	(England) ENG	Johnnie Jackson	28	2	25+1	2	1	0	1	0
5	DF	(England) ENG	Michael Morrison	4	0	1+1	0	0	0	2	0
5	DF	(Serbia) SRB	Miloš Veljković (Note: Veljković was born in Basel, Switzerland, and represented them at U-16 level, but also qualified to represent Serbia through his parents and represented them at U-17, U-19, U-20 and U-21 level before making his international debut for Serbia in November 2017.) (on loan from Tottenham Hotspur)	3	0	3	0	0	0	0	0
6	DF	(Cameroon) CMR	André Bikey	34	1	29+2	1	1	0	2	0
7	MF	(Iceland) ISL	Jóhann Berg Guðmundsson	44	11	38+3	10	1	1	0+2	0
8	MF	(Gabon) GAB	Frédéric Bulot (on loan from Standard Liège) (Note: Bulot was born in Libreville, Gabon, but also qualified to represent France internationally through his father and represented them at U-16, U-17, U-18, U-19, and U-21 level, before making his international debut for Gabon in March 2014.)	28	5	19+9	5	0	0	0	0
9	MF	(England) ENG	Chris Eagles	15	2	5+10	2	0	0	0	0
10	MF	(Belgium) BEL	Franck Moussa	16	1	4+10	1	0	0	2	0
11	MF	(England) ENG	Callum Harriott (Note: Harriott was born in Croydon, England, and represented them at U-19 level, but also qualified to represent Guyana and Jamaica internationally and would make his international debut for Guyana in March 2019.)	23	1	11+10	1	0	0	2	0
12	MF	(France) FRA	Francis Coquelin (on loan from Arsenal)	5	0	3+2	0	0	0	0	0
12	MF	(France) FRA	Alou Diarra	12	1	8+4	1	0	0	0	0
13	GK	(England) ENG	Dillon Phillips	0	0	0	0	0	0	0	0
14	FW	(Angola) ANG	Igor Vetokele (Note: Vetokele was born in Ostend, Belgium, and represented them at U-17, U-18, U-19, and U-21 level, but also qualified to represent Angola internationally and made his international debut for Angola in 2014.)	43	11	37+4	11	0	0	0+2	0
15	DF	(United States) USA	Oguchi Onyewu	3	0	1+2	0	0	0	0	0
16	DF	(Wales) WAL	Rhoys Wiggins (Note: Wiggins was born in Hillingdon, England, but also qualified to represent Wales internationally and represented them at U-17, U-19, and U-21 level.)	21	0	21	0	0	0	0	0
17	MF	(Belgium) BEL	Yoni Buyens (on loan from Standard Liège)	43	9	38+2	8	1	0	1+1	1
18	FW	(Wales) WAL	Simon Church (Note: Church was born in High Wycombe, England, but also qualified to represent Wales through his grandparents and represented them at U-21 level before making his international debut for Wales in May 2009.)	19	3	3+14	2	1	0	0+1	1
19	FW	(Ghana) GHA	Zak Ansah (Note: Ansah was born in Bexley, England, and represented them at U-16 and U-17 level, but also qualified to represent Ghana internationally and has confirmed his international allegiance to them.)	0	0	0	0	0	0	0	0
20	DF	(England) ENG	Chris Solly	38	0	38	0	0	0	0	0
21	DF	(Wales) WAL	Morgan Fox (Note: Fox was born in Chelmsford, England, but also qualified to represent Wales internationally and represented them at U-21 level.)	34	0	23+8	0	1	0	2	0
22	DF	(France) FRA	Loïc Négo	0	0	0	0	0	0	0	0
22	DF	(England) ENG	Roger Johnson	14	0	14	0	0	0	0	0
23	FW	(England) ENG	Joe Pigott	2	0	0+1	0	0+1	0	0	0
24	MF	(England) ENG	Jordan Cousins	47	3	43+1	3	1	0	2	0
25	MF	(Guyana) GUY	Kadell Daniel (Note: Daniel was born in Lambeth, England, but also qualified to represent Guyana internationally and represented them at U-23 level before making his international debut for Guyana in June 2015.)	0	0	0	0	0	0	0	0
26	DF	(Israel) ISR	Tal Ben Haim	38	0	37	0	1	0	0	0
27	MF	(England) ENG	Jack Munns	0	0	0	0	0	0	0	0
28	DF	(England) ENG	Harry Osborne	0	0	0	0	0	0	0	0
29	FW	(Romania) ROU	George Țucudean	23	2	14+6	2	1	0	2	0
30	GK	(England) ENG	Nick Pope	9	0	7+1	0	0	0	1	0
31	DF	(England) ENG	Harry Lennon	0	0	0	0	0	0	0	0
32	FW	(Scotland) SCO	Tony Watt	22	5	16+6	5	0	0	0	0
33	MF	(England) ENG	Ollie Muldoon	0	0	0	0	0	0	0	0
34	MF	(England) ENG	Kurtis Cumberbatch	0	0	0	0	0	0	0	0
35	MF	(Antigua and Barbuda) ATG	Rhys Browne (Note: Browne was born in Havering, England, but also qualified to represent Antigua and Barbuda internationally and made his international debut for Antigua and Barbuda in June 2015.)	0	0	0	0	0	0	0	0
36	GK	(Serbia) SRB	Marko Dmitrović	5	0	4+1	0	0	0	0	0
37	DF	(England) ENG	Tareiq Holmes-Dennis	0	0	0	0	0	0	0	0
38	DF	(England) ENG	Terell Thomas	0	0	0	0	0	0	0	0
39	DF	(England) ENG	Levander Pyke	0	0	0	0	0	0	0	0
40	MF	(Belgium) BEL	Christophe Lepoint	6	0	1+5	0	0	0	0	0
41	GK	(Bulgaria) BUL	Dimitar Mitov	0	0	0	0	0	0	0	0
42	GK	(England) ENG	Jordan Beeney	0	0	0	0	0	0	0	0
43	FW	(England) ENG	Karlan Ahearne-Grant	6	0	2+3	0	0+1	0	0	0
44	GK	(Philippines) PHI	Neil Etheridge (Note: Etheridge was born in Enfield, England, and represented them at U-16 level, but also qualified to represent the Philippines through his mother and made his international debut for the Philippines in May 2008.)	5	0	4	0	1	0	0	0

=== Top scorers ===
As of 2 May 2015

Place	Position	Nation	Number	Name	Championship	FA Cup	League Cup	Total
1	FW	(Angola)	14	Igor Vetokele	11	0	0	11
=	MF	(Iceland)	7	Jóhann Berg Guðmundsson	10	1	0	11
3	MF	(Belgium)	17	Yoni Buyens	8	0	1	9
4	MF	(Gabon)	8	Frédéric Bulot	5	0	0	5
=	FW	(Scotland)	32	Tony Watt	5	0	0	5
6	MF	(England)	24	Jordan Cousins	3	0	0	3
=	FW	(Wales)	18	Simon Church	2	0	1	3
8	MF	(England)	9	Chris Eagles	2	0	0	2
=	MF	(England)	4	Johnnie Jackson	2	0	0	2
=	FW	(Romania)	29	George Țucudean	2	0	0	2
=	DF	(England)	2	Lawrie Wilson	0	0	2	2
12	DF	(Cameroon)	6	André Bikey	1	0	0	1
=	MF	(France)	12	Alou Diarra	1	0	0	1
=	MF	(England)	11	Callum Harriott	1	0	0	1
=	MF	(Belgium)	10	Franck Moussa	1	0	0	1
Totals					54	1	4	59

=== Disciplinary record ===
As of 2 May 2015

Number	Nation	Position	Name	Championship		FA Cup		League Cup		Total	
Number	Nation	Position	Name	Booked	Sent off (straight red)	Booked	Sent off (straight red)	Booked	Sent off (straight red)	Booked	Sent off (straight red)
17	(Belgium)	MF	Yoni Buyens	11	0	1	1	0	0	12	1
20	(England)	DF	Chris Solly	5	1	0	0	0	0	5	1
26	(Israel)	DF	Tal Ben Haim	5	0	0	0	0	0	5	0
24	(England)	MF	Jordan Cousins	4	0	0	0	0	0	4	0
6	(Cameroon)	DF	André Bikey	3	0	0	0	0	0	3	0
21	(Wales)	DF	Morgan Fox	3	0	0	0	0	0	3	0
29	(Romania)	FW	George Țucudean	3	0	0	0	0	0	3	0
16	(Wales)	DF	Rhoys Wiggins	3	0	0	0	0	0	3	0
14	(Angola)	FW	Igor Vetokele	3	0	0	0	0	0	3	0
22	(England)	DF	Roger Johnson	3	0	0	0	0	0	3	0
18	(Wales)	FW	Simon Church	2	0	0	0	0	0	2	0
3	(England)	DF	Joe Gomez	2	0	0	0	0	0	2	0
4	(England)	MF	Johnnie Jackson	2	0	0	0	0	0	2	0
40	(Belgium)	MF	Christophe Lepoint	2	0	0	0	0	0	2	0
32	(Scotland)	FW	Tony Watt	2	0	0	0	0	0	2	0
12	(France)	MF	Alou Diarra	2	0	0	0	0	0	2	0
7	(Iceland)	MF	Jóhann Berg Guðmundsson	1	0	1	0	0	0	2	0
12	(France)	MF	Francis Coquelin	1	0	0	0	0	0	1	0
1	(Republic of Ireland)	GK	Stephen Henderson	1	0	0	0	0	0	1	0
10	(Belgium)	MF	Franck Moussa	1	0	0	0	0	0	1	0
5	(England)	DF	Michael Morrison	0	0	0	0	1	0	1	0
30	(England)	GK	Nick Pope	0	0	0	0	1	0	1	0
11	(England)	MF	Callum Harriott	0	1	0	0	0	0	0	1
Totals				59	2	2	1	2	0	63	3

== Football League Championship ==
=== League table ===
Pos	Team	Pld	W	D	L	GF	GA	GD	Pts
10	Birmingham City	46	16	15	15	54	64	−10	63
11	Cardiff City	46	16	14	16	57	61	−4	62
12	Charlton Athletic	46	14	18	14	54	60	−6	60
13	Sheffield Wednesday	46	14	18	14	43	49	−6	60
14	Nottingham Forest	46	15	14	17	71	69	+2	59

Updated to match(es) played on 2 May 2015. Source: Sky Sports
Rules for classification: 1) Points; 2) Goal difference; 3) Number of goals scored

=== Results summary ===
Overall								Home						Away					
Pld	W	D	L	GF	GA	GD	Pts	W	D	L	GF	GA	GD	W	D	L	GF	GA	GD
46	14	18	14	54	60	−6	60	9	9	5	32	27	+5	5	9	9	22	33	−11

Last updated: 2 May 2015.

=== Results by round ===
Round	1	2	3	4	5	6	7	8	9	10	11	12	13	14	15	16	17	18	19	20	21	22	23	24	25	26	27	28	29	30	31	32	33	34	35	36	37	38	39	40	41	42	43	44	45	46
Ground	A	H	H	A	A	H	H	A	H	A	H	A	H	A	H	A	A	H	H	A	H	A	H	A	H	A	A	H	A	H	H	A	A	H	H	A	H	A	H	A	H	A	A	H	A	H
Result	D	W	W	D	D	W	D	D	D	W	D	L	W	L	D	D	W	D	L	D	D	L	D	L	L	L	D	D	L	L	W	W	L	W	W	W	L	W	W	L	D	D	D	W	L	L
Position	14	6	4	5	6	5	5	7	8	7	6	8	7	7	9	9	8	9	10	11	10	12	12	13	14	16	17	18	19	20	18	12	16	12	12	12	12	11	11	11	11	11	12	10	10	12

Updated to match(es) played on 2 May 2015. Source:
A = Away; H = Home; W = Win; D = Draw; L = Loss

== Fixtures and results ==
=== Pre-season ===
5 July 2014	(Belgium) Standard Liège	2–0	Charlton Athletic	Stayen
21:30 BST(45 minute game)	De Camargo 16'; Ezekiel 45'	Report

6 July 2014	(Belgium) Sint-Truidense	0–0	Charlton Athletic	Stayen
17:00 BST		Report

12 July 2014	Welling United	2–0	Charlton Athletic	Park View Road
15:00	St Amie 5' (pen.); Ashikodi 78'	Report		Attendance: 2,360; Referee: Ian Crouch

16 July 2014	Gibraltar XI	1–5	Charlton Athletic	La Cala Resort
19:30	Barrios 22'	Report	Vetokele 35', 54'; Harriott 47'; Țucudean 77'; Church 81'

16 July 2014	Thurrock	1–4	Charlton Athletic XI	Ship Lane
19:45	Spence 43'	Report	Kandi 10'; Ahearne-Grant 24'; Jeffrey 52'; Umerah 79'	Referee: Stuart Cheek

19 July 2014	Atlético Clube de Portugal	0–2	Charlton Athletic	La Cala Resort
18:00 BST		Report	Jackson 23'; Țucudean 89'

23 July 2014	Ebbsfleet United	1–0	Charlton Athletic	Stonebridge Road
19:45	Godden 74' (pen.)	Report		Attendance: 1,416; Referee: D. Rock

26 July 2014	Charlton Athletic	1–0	Southend United	Sparrows Lane
11:00	Guðmundsson 84'	Report		Attendance: 0

29 July 2014	Lewes	0–0	Charlton Athletic XI	The Dripping Pan
19:45		Report		Attendance: 275; Referee: Graham Kane

30 July 2014	Peterborough United	0–0	Charlton Athletic	London Road Stadium
19:45		Report		Referee: D. Deadman

2 August 2014	Bromley	1–1	Charlton Athletic XI	Courage Stadium
15:00	Ademola 37'	Report	Lee 88'	Referee: Ian Bentley

2 August 2014	Portsmouth	1–2	Charlton Athletic	Fratton Park
15:00	Hollands 23'	Report	Vetokele 19'; Țucudean 26'	Attendance: 3,915; Referee: J. Linington

5 August 2014	Billericay Town	2–3	Charlton Athletic XI	New Lodge
19:45	Poole 2'; Sappleton 30' (pen.)	Report	Sho-Silva 20'; Osborne 60'; Umerah 77'	Attendance: 291

=== Championship ===
The fixtures for the 2014–15 season were announced on 18 June 2014 at 9am.

9 August 2014 1	Brentford	1–1	Charlton Athletic	Brentford
15:00	Smith 85'	Report	Vetokele 64'	Stadium: Griffin Park; Attendance: 9,690; Referee: James Adcock

16 August 2014 2	Charlton Athletic	2–1	Wigan Athletic	Charlton
15:00	Cousins 8'; Moussa 90'	Report	McManaman 22'	Stadium: The Valley; Attendance: 15,334; Referee: Andy D'Urso

19 August 2014 3	Charlton Athletic	3–2	Derby County	Charlton
19:45	Țucudean 11'; Buyens 45+5' (pen.); Vetokele 78'	Report	Ward 31', 85'	Stadium: The Valley; Attendance: 15,317; Referee: Michael Bull

23 August 2014 4	Huddersfield Town	1–1	Charlton Athletic	Huddersfield
15:00	Wells 50'	Report	Vetokele 90+2'	Stadium: John Smith's Stadium; Attendance: 11,333; Referee: Tim Robinson

30 August 2014 5	Brighton & Hove Albion	2–2	Charlton Athletic	Brighton and Hove
15:00	Dunk 67', 90+3'	Report	Vetokele 4', 75'	Stadium: Falmer Stadium; Attendance: 26,189; Referee: Keith Hill

13 September 2014 6	Charlton Athletic	1–0	Watford	Charlton
15:00	Buyens 3' (pen.)	Report		Stadium: The Valley; Attendance: 17,628; Referee: Andy Madley

16 September 2014 7	Charlton Athletic	1–1	Wolverhampton Wanderers	Charlton
19:45	Bikey 25'	Report	Batth 65'	Stadium: The Valley; Attendance: 15,973; Referee: Pat Miller

20 September 2014 8	Rotherham United	1–1	Charlton Athletic	Rotherham
15:00	Becchio 70'	Report	Guðmundsson 27'	Stadium: New York Stadium; Attendance: 9,620; Referee: Darren Deadman

27 September 2014 9	Charlton Athletic	0–0	Middlesbrough	Charlton
15:00		Report		Stadium: The Valley; Attendance: 16,110; Referee: Gavin Ward

30 September 2014 10	Norwich City	0–1	Charlton Athletic	Norwich
19:45		Report	Jackson 86'	Stadium: Carrow Road; Attendance: 25,983; Referee: Mick Russell

4 October 2014 11	Charlton Athletic	1–1	Birmingham City	Charlton
15:00	Vetokele 11'	Report	Davis 53'	Stadium: The Valley; Attendance: 16,369; Referee: Paul Tierney

18 October 2014 12	Bournemouth	1–0	Charlton Athletic	Bournemouth
15:00	Wilson 3'	Report		Stadium: Dean Court; Attendance: 10,360; Referee: James Linington

21 October 2014 13	Charlton Athletic	2–1	Bolton Wanderers	Charlton
19:45	Țucudean 28'; Jackson 51'	Report	Moxey 54'	Stadium: The Valley; Attendance: 13,433; Referee: Simon Hooper

24 October 2014 14	Fulham	3–0	Charlton Athletic	Fulham
19:45	Parker 6'; Rodallega 12', 89'	Report		Stadium: Craven Cottage; Attendance: 17,923; Referee: Keith Stroud

1 November 2014 15	Charlton Athletic	1–1	Sheffield Wednesday	Charlton
15:00	Vetokele 70'	Report	Drenthe 27'	Stadium: The Valley; Attendance: 16,850; Referee: Andy D'Urso

4 November 2014 16	Leeds United	2–2	Charlton Athletic	Leeds
19:45	Mowatt 49', 67'	Report	Guðmundsson 62', 81' (pen.)	Stadium: Elland Road; Attendance: 18,698; Referee: Graham Salisbury

8 November 2014 17	Reading	0–1	Charlton Athletic	Reading
15:00		Report	Vetokele 39'	Stadium: Madjeski Stadium; Attendance: 16,989; Referee: Neil Swarbrick

22 November 2014 18	Charlton Athletic	0–0	Millwall	Charlton
15:00		Report		Stadium: The Valley; Attendance: 19,189; Referee: Graham Scott

29 November 2014 19	Charlton Athletic	0–1	Ipswich Town	Charlton
12:15		Report	Hunt 90+5'	Stadium: The Valley; Attendance: 16,613; Referee: Darren Bond

6 December 2014 20	Nottingham Forest	1–1	Charlton Athletic	West Bridgford
15:00	Tesche 59'	Report	Harriott 9'	Stadium: City Ground; Attendance: 22,297; Referee: Kevin Wright

13 December 2014 21	Charlton Athletic	2–2	Blackpool	Charlton
15:00	Buyens 38' (pen.); Cousins 55'	Report	Eagles 25'; Davies 89'	Stadium: The Valley; Attendance: 15,411; Referee: Andy Davies

20 December 2014 22	Blackburn Rovers	2–0	Charlton Athletic	Blackburn
15:00	Rhodes 6', 19'	Report		Stadium: Ewood Park; Attendance: 13,231; Referee: David Webb

26 December 2014 23	Charlton Athletic	1–1	Cardiff City	Charlton
13:00	Guðmundsson 88'	Report	Adeyemi 12'	Stadium: The Valley; Attendance: 17,543; Referee: Mick Russell

30 December 2014 24	Ipswich Town	3–0	Charlton Athletic	Ipswich
19:45	Smith 31'; Murphy 59'; McGoldrick 90'	Report		Stadium: Portman Road; Attendance: 26,157; Referee: Chris Kavanagh

10 January 2015 25	Charlton Athletic	0–1	Brighton & Hove Albion	Charlton
15:00		Report	Ince 62'	Stadium: The Valley; Attendance: 17,865; Referee: Lee Probert

17 January 2015 26	Watford	5–0	Charlton Athletic	Watford
15:00	Cathcart 15'; Deeney 25'; Ighalo 44', 58'; Tőzsér 90'	Report		Stadium: Vicarage Road; Attendance: 17,703; Referee: Darren Bond

24 January 2015 27	Wolverhampton Wanderers	0–0	Charlton Athletic	Wolverhampton
15:00		Report		Stadium: Molineux Stadium; Attendance: 23,487; Referee: Andy D'Urso

31 January 2015 28	Charlton Athletic	1–1	Rotherham United	Charlton
15:00	Cousins 83'	Report	Ward 90'	Stadium: The Valley; Attendance: 14,447; Referee: Scott Duncan

7 February 2015 29	Middlesbrough	3–1	Charlton Athletic	Middlesbrough
15:00	Bamford 6'; Vossen 48'; Tomlin 88'	Report	Guðmundsson 37'	Stadium: Riverside Stadium; Attendance: 18,903; Referee: Trevor Kettle

10 February 2015 30	Charlton Athletic	2–3	Norwich City	Charlton
19:45	Watt 61'; Vetokele 68'	Report	Howson 14'; Grabban 43'; Jerome 83'	Stadium: The Valley; Attendance: 15,094; Referee: Andy Woolmer

14 February 2015 31	Charlton Athletic	3–0	Brentford	Charlton
15:00	Guðmundsson 27'; Vetokele 55'; Bulot 90+1'	Report		Stadium: The Valley; Attendance: 14,875; Referee: Graham Scott

20 February 2015 32	Wigan Athletic	0–3	Charlton Athletic	Wigan
19:45		Report	Bulot 17'; Vetokele 45+2'; Eagles 88'	Stadium: DW Stadium; Attendance: 11,344; Referee: Chris Kavanagh

24 February 2015 33	Derby County	2–0	Charlton Athletic	Derby
19:45	Hendrick 9'; Lingard 17'	Report		Stadium: Pride Park Stadium; Attendance: 28,277; Referee: David Coote

28 February 2015 34	Charlton Athletic	3–0	Huddersfield Town	Charlton
15:00	Guðmundsson 34'; Watt 48', 71'	Report		Stadium: The Valley; Attendance: 25,545; Referee: James Linington

3 March 2015 35	Charlton Athletic	2–1	Nottingham Forest	Charlton
19:45	Bulot 7', 38'	Report	Antonio 14'	Stadium: The Valley; Attendance: 14,937; Referee: Simon Hooper

7 March 2015 36	Cardiff City	1–2	Charlton Athletic	Cardiff
15:00	Macheda 56'	Report	Watt 74'; Buyens 87' (pen.)	Stadium: Cardiff City Stadium; Attendance: 20,488; Referee: Pat Miller

14 March 2015 37	Charlton Athletic	1–3	Blackburn Rovers	Charlton
15:00	Buyens 57' (pen.)	Report	Rhodes 15', 78'; Conway 18'	Stadium: The Valley; Attendance: 14,888; Referee: Charles Breakspear

17 March 2015 38	Blackpool	0–3	Charlton Athletic	Blackpool
19:45		Report	Eagles 31'; Church 61'; Guðmundsson 88'	Stadium: Bloomfield Road; Attendance: 9,168; Referee: David Webb

21 March 2015 39	Charlton Athletic	3–2	Reading	Charlton
15:00	Buyens 58' (pen.), 70'; Church 80'	Report	Pogrebnyak 40', 90'	Stadium: The Valley; Attendance: 15,007; Referee: Darren Deadman

3 April 2015 40	Millwall	2–1	Charlton Athletic	Bermondsey
15:00	Gueye 79'; Hooiveld 87'	Report	Diarra 67'	Stadium: The Den; Attendance: 14,722; Referee: Mick Russell

7 April 2015 41	Charlton Athletic	1–1	Fulham	Charlton
19:45	Guðmundsson 16'	Report	McCormack 8'	Stadium: The Valley; Attendance: 16,521; Referee: Andy Madley

11 April 2015 42	Sheffield Wednesday	1–1	Charlton Athletic	Sheffield
15:00	Lavery 41'	Report	Guðmundsson 75'	Stadium: Hillsborough Stadium; Attendance: 23,257; Referee: Darren Bond

14 April 2015 43	Bolton Wanderers	1–1	Charlton Athletic	Bolton
20:00	Le Fondre 79'	Report	Bulot 9'	Stadium: Macron Stadium; Attendance: 12,994; Referee: Kevin Wright

18 April 2015 44	Charlton Athletic	2–1	Leeds United	Charlton
15:00	Watt 75'; Buyens 80' (pen.)	Report	Morison 40'	Stadium: The Valley; Attendance: 18,053; Referee: Tony Harrington

25 April 2015 45	Birmingham City	1–0	Charlton Athletic	Birmingham
15:00	Dyer 82'	Report		Stadium: St Andrew's; Attendance: 17,775; Referee: Jeremy Simpson

2 May 2015 46	Charlton Athletic	0–3	Bournemouth	Charlton
12:15		Report	Ritchie 10', 85'; Arter 12'	Stadium: The Valley; Attendance: 21,280; Referee: Neil Swarbrick

=== League Cup ===
The draw for the first round was made on 17 June 2014 at 10am. Charlton Athletic were drawn at home to Colchester United.

12 August 2014 Round One	Charlton Athletic	4–0	Colchester United	The Valley
19:45	Buyens 24' (pen.); Wilson 54', 59'; Church 89'	Report		Attendance: 5,752; Referee: Charles Breakspear

26 August 2014 Round Two	Derby County	1–0	Charlton Athletic	Pride Park Stadium
19:45	Calero 87'	Report		Attendance: 16,367; Referee: Graham Salisbury

=== FA Cup ===
3 January 2015 Round Three	Charlton Athletic	1–2	Blackburn Rovers	The Valley
15:00	Guðmundsson 55'	Report	Taylor 4', 59'	Attendance: 8,727; Referee: Keith Stroud

== Transfers ==
=== In ===
Date	Pos.	Name	From	Fee	Ref.
13 May 2014	MF	(England) Kurtis Cumberbatch	(England) Watford	Free	
6 June 2014	FW	(Ghana) Zak Ansah	(England) Arsenal	Free	
24 June 2014	FW	(Angola) Igor Vetokele	(Denmark) Copenhagen	Undisclosed	
2 July 2014	MF	(Belgium) Franck Moussa	(England) Coventry City	Free	
9 July 2014	DF	(Cameroon) André Bikey	(Greece) Panetolikos	Free	
11 July 2014	DF	(Israel) Tal Ben Haim	(Belgium) Standard Liège	Free	
11 July 2014	MF	(Iceland) Jóhann Berg Guðmundsson	(Netherlands) AZ Alkmaar	Free	
15 July 2014	FW	(Romania) George Țucudean	(Belgium) Standard Liège	Free	
21 July 2014	GK	(Republic of Ireland) Stephen Henderson	(England) West Ham United	Free	
31 October 2014	DF	(United States) Oguchi Onyewu	(England) Sheffield Wednesday	Free	
5 January 2015	GK	(Philippines) Neil Etheridge	(England) Oldham Athletic	Free	
6 January 2015	GK	(Serbia) Marko Dmitrović	(Hungary) Újpest	Undisclosed	
6 January 2015	FW	(Scotland) Tony Watt	(Belgium) Standard Liège	Undisclosed	
29 January 2015	MF	(Belgium) Christophe Lepoint	(Belgium) Gent	Undisclosed	
3 February 2015	DF	(England) Roger Johnson	(England) Wolverhampton Wanderers	Free	
19 February 2015	MF	(England) Chris Eagles	(England) Blackpool	Free	
23 February 2015	MF	(France) Alou Diarra	(England) West Ham United	Free	
26 March 2015	MF	(England) Kieran Monlouis	(England) Stoke City	Free	

=== Out ===
Date	Pos.	Name	To	Fee	Ref.
7 May 2014	MF	(England) Andrew Hughes	(England) Bolton Wanderers	Free	
22 May 2014	FW	(England) Ade Azeez	(England) AFC Wimbledon	Free	
22 May 2014	FW	(England) Jordan Cook	(England) Walsall	Free	
22 May 2014	DF	(Guyana) Leon Cort (Note: Cort was born in Southwark, England, but also qualified to represent Guyana internationally and made his international debut for Guyana in 2010.)	Retired	Free	
22 May 2014	DF	(Cameroon) Cedric Evina	(England) Doncaster Rovers	Free	
22 May 2014	DF	(Republic of Ireland) Kevin Feely (Note: Feely was born in Brussels, Belgium, but also qualified to represent the Republic of Ireland internationally and represented them at U-21 level.)	(Wales) Newport County	Free	
22 May 2014	MF	(England) Mark Gower	Unattached	Free	
22 May 2014	MF	(England) Danny Green	(England) MK Dons	Free	
22 May 2014	GK	(England) Ben Hamer	(England) Leicester City	Free	
22 May 2014	MF	(England) Danny Hollands	(England) Portsmouth	Free	
22 May 2014	MF	(England) Bradley Jordan	Unattached	Free	
22 May 2014	MF	(Zimbabwe) Bradley Pritchard	(England) Leyton Orient	Free	
27 May 2014	DF	(France) Dorian Dervite	(England) Bolton Wanderers	Free	
25 June 2014	MF	(England) Diego Poyet (Note: Poyet was born in Zaragoza, Spain, but was raised in England from the age of 2 and also qualified to represent Uruguay internationally through his father. He represented England at U-16 and U-17 level and would go on to represent Uruguay at U-20 level.)	(England) West Ham United	Compensation	
26 June 2014	DF	(England) Richard Wood	(England) Rotherham United	Free	
1 January 2015	DF	(England) Michael Morrison	(England) Birmingham City	Free	

=== Loan in ===
Date	Pos.	Name	From	Expiry date	Ref.
21 June 2014	MF	(Belgium) Yoni Buyens	(Belgium) Standard Liège	31 May 2015	
30 August 2014	MF	(Gabon) Frédéric Bulot	(Belgium) Standard Liège	31 May 2015	
3 November 2014	MF	(France) Francis Coquelin	(England) Arsenal	12 December 2014	
27 November 2014	GK	(Philippines) Neil Etheridge	(England) Oldham Athletic	30 December 2014	
20 January 2015	DF	(Serbia) Miloš Veljković	(England) Tottenham Hotspur	30 June 2015	

=== Loan out ===
Date	Pos.	Name	To	Expiry date	Ref.
22 July 2014	DF	(England) Harry Lennon	(England) Cambridge United	31 October 2014	
1 August 2014	FW	(Poland) Piotr Parzyszek	(Belgium) Sint-Truiden	30 June 2015	
6 August 2014	FW	(Iran) Reza Ghoochannejhad	Kuwait SC	17 February 2015	
23 August 2014	DF	(France) Loïc Négo	(Hungary) Újpest	30 June 2015	
9 September 2014	FW	(England) Tobi Sho-Silva	(England) Welling United	7 October 2014	
11 September 2014	FW	(England) Joe Pigott	(Wales) Newport County	22 November 2014	
19 September 2014	DF	(England) Harry Osborne	(England) Sutton United	22 October 2014	
16 October 2014	DF	(England) Tareiq Holmes-Dennis	(England) Oxford United	2 February 2015	
31 October 2014	DF	(England) Michael Morrison	(England) Birmingham City	31 December 2014	
14 November 2014	DF	(England) Harry Osborne	(England) Sutton United	4 January 2015	
15 November 2014	DF	(England) Ayo Obileye	(England) Dagenham & Redbridge	30 June 2015	
27 November 2014	DF	(England) Harry Lennon	(England) Gillingham	2 January 2015	
5 January 2015	GK	(England) Dillon Phillips	(England) Bishop's Stortford	2 February 2015	
5 January 2015	DF	(England) Harry Osborne	(England) Welling United	7 February 2015	
6 January 2015	GK	(England) Nick Pope	(England) Bury	30 June 2015	
10 January 2015	FW	(England) Joe Pigott	(England) Southend United	30 June 2015	
15 January 2015	FW	(Northern Ireland) Mikhail Kennedy	(England) VCD Athletic	17 February 2015	
30 January 2015	FW	(Romania) George Țucudean	(Romania) Steaua București	30 June 2016	
10 February 2015	DF	(England) Tareiq Holmes-Dennis	(England) Plymouth Argyle	30 June 2015	
17 February 2015	FW	(Iran) Reza Ghoochannejhad	(Qatar) Al-Wakrah SC	30 June 2015	
27 February 2015	GK	(Bulgaria) Dimitar Mitov	(England) Canvey Island	27 March 2015	
11 March 2015	MF	(England) Ollie Muldoon	(England) Gillingham	30 June 2015	
20 March 2015	DF	(England) Lawrie Wilson	(England) Rotherham United	31 May 2015	
26 March 2015	FW	(Ghana) Zak Ansah	(England) Plymouth Argyle	31 May 2015	
26 March 2015	DF	(Guyana) Kadell Daniel	(England) Torquay United	25 April 2015	
