= 2014–15 Wigan Athletic F.C. season =

Wigan Athletic F.C.
2014–15 season
- Owner: Dave Whelan
- Chairman: David Sharpe
- Manager: Uwe Rösler (until 13 November 2014); Malky Mackay (from 19 November 2014 until 6 April 2015); Gary Caldwell (from 7 April 2015)
- Stadium: DW Stadium
- Championship: 23rd (relegated)
- FA Cup: Third round
- League Cup: First round
- Top goalscorer: League: James McClean (6); All: James McClean (6)
- Highest home attendance: 16,347 (vs Middlesbrough)
- Lowest home attendance: 10,210 (vs Millwall)
| Home colours | Away colours |

The 2014–15 season was Wigan Athletic's second consecutive season in the Championship and fourth overall.

== Season summary ==
Considered one of the favourites for promotion at the start of the season, Wigan failed to live up to expectations, and won only three of their first 17 league games, with manager Uwe Rösler being sacked in November after the club slipped into the bottom three of the league table. Results failed to improve under replacement manager Malky Mackay, who was also sacked after only four months in charge. The club's relegation to League One was confirmed on 28 April.

== Transfers ==
=== In ===
| Squad # | Position | Player | Transferred from | Fee | Date | Source |
|---|---|---|---|---|---|---|
| 3 | DF | (England) Andrew Taylor | (Wales) Cardiff City | Free | 3 June 2014 | |
| 22 | DF | (Scotland) Aaron Taylor-Sinclair | (Scotland) Partick Thistle | Free | 4 June 2014 | |
| 2 | DF | (England) James Tavernier | (England) Newcastle United | Undisclosed | 28 June 2014 | |
| 9 | FW | (Spain) Oriol Riera | (Spain) Osasuna | Undisclosed | 28 June 2014 | |
| 19 | MF | (Scotland) Don Cowie | (Wales) Cardiff City | Free | 10 July 2014 | |
| 29 | MF | (England) Adam Forshaw | (England) Brentford | Undisclosed | 1 September 2014 | |
| 49 | FW | (France) Andy Delort | (France) Tours | Undisclosed | 1 September 2014 | |
| 36 | MF | (Denmark) William Kvist | (Germany) Stuttgart | Free | 1 September 2014 | |
| 14 | MF | (Wales) Emyr Huws | (England) Manchester City | Undisclosed | 1 September 2014 | |
| 10 | FW | (Northern Ireland) Billy McKay | (Scotland) Inverness Caledonian Thistle | Undisclosed | 30 January 2015 | |
| 28 | DF | (England) Jason Pearce | (England) Leeds United | £300,000 | 30 January 2015 | |
| 20 | FW | (Cameroon) Gaëtan Bong | (Greece) Olympiacos | Free | 2 February 2015 | |
| 16 | MF | (South Korea) Kim Bo-kyung | (Wales) Cardiff City | Free | 6 February 2015 | |
| 15 | MF | (England) Jermaine Pennant | (India) FC Pune City | Free | 22 February 2015 | |

=== Loan In ===
| Squad # | Position | Player | Transferred from | Duration | Date | Source |
|---|---|---|---|---|---|---|
| 14 | MF | (Wales) Emyr Huws | (England) Manchester City | Six Months (made permanent 1 September) | 22 July 2014 | |
| 31 | DF | (Honduras) Maynor Figueroa | (England) Hull City | Two Months | 21 October 2014 | |
| 27 | DF | (England) Liam Ridgewell | (United States) Portland Timbers | Six Weeks | 8 January 2015 | |
| 8 | DF | (Australia) Chris Herd | (England) Aston Villa | Until end of season | 26 January 2015 | |
| 18 | MF | (England) Sheyi Ojo | (England) Liverpool | Until end of season | 2 February 2015 | |
| 21 | FW | (England) Leon Clarke | (England) Wolverhampton Wanderers | Until end of season | 2 February 2015 | |
| 4 | DF | (England) Harry Maguire | (England) Hull City | One Month (extended 13 March) | 10 February 2015 | |
| 27 | MF | (England) Josh Murphy | (England) Norwich City | One Month (extended 16 April) | 16 March 2015 | |
| 31 | FW | (England) Jerome Sinclair | (England) Liverpool | Until end of season | 16 March 2015 | |

=== Out ===
| Squad # | Position | Player | Transferred To | Fee | Date | Source |
|---|---|---|---|---|---|---|
| 14 | MF | (Spain) Jordi Gómez | (England) Sunderland | Free | 1 July 2014 | |
| 28 | MF | (England) Daniel Redmond | (Scotland) Hamilton Academical | Free | 1 July 2014 | |
| 22 | MF | (Chile) Jean Beausejour | (Chile) Colo-Colo | Free | 7 July 2014 | |
| 43 | DF | (England) Adam Buxton | (England) Accrington Stanley | Free | 7 July 2014 | |
| 3 | DF | (Scotland) Stephen Crainey | (England) Fleetwood Town | Free | 7 July 2014 | |
| 2 | DF | (Sweden) Markus Holgersson | (Cyprus) Anorthosis Famagusta | Free | 7 July 2014 | |
| 27 | DF | (England) Jordan Mustoe | (England) Accrington Stanley | Free | 7 July 2014 | |
| — | GK | (Slovakia) Marko Maroši | (England) Doncaster Rovers | Free | 7 August 2014 | |
| 16 | MF | (Scotland) James McArthur | (England) Crystal Palace | £7,000,000 | 1 September 2014 | |
| 36 | FW | (England) Rakish Bingham | (England) Mansfield Town | Free | 1 September 2014 | |
| 14 | MF | (Honduras) Roger Espinoza | (United States) Sporting Kansas City | Undisclosed | 1 January 2015 | |
| 8 | MF | (England) Ben Watson | (England) Watford | Undisclosed | 23 January 2015 | |
| 10 | MF | (Scotland) Shaun Maloney | (United States) Chicago Fire | Undisclosed | 25 January 2015 | |
| 29 | MF | (England) Adam Forshaw | (England) Middlesbrough | Undisclosed | 28 January 2015 | |
| 15 | MF | (England) Callum McManaman | (England) West Bromwich Albion | £4,750,000 | 28 January 2015 | |
| 4 | DF | (Spain) Iván Ramis | (Spain) Levante | Free | 29 January 2015 | |
| 20 | MF | (Scotland) Fraser Fyvie | (Scotland) Hibernian | Free | 2 February 2015 | |
| 6 | DF | (Norway) Thomas Rogne | (Sweden) IFK Göteborg | Free | 10 March 2015 | |

=== Loan Out ===
| Squad # | Position | Player | Transferred from | Duration | Date | Source |
|---|---|---|---|---|---|---|
| 23 | DF | (Honduras) Juan Carlos García | (Spain) Tenerife | Full Season | 10 August 2014 | |
| 42 | FW | (England) Grant Holt | (England) Huddersfield Town | Six Weeks (extended 24 October until 28 December) | 27 September 2014 | |
| 26 | GK | (Oman) Ali Al-Habsi | (England) Brighton & Hove Albion | One Month | 31 October 2014 | |
| 9 | FW | (Spain) Oriol Riera | (Spain) Deportivo de La Coruña | Until end of season | 7 January 2015 | |
| 2 | DF | (England) James Tavernier | (England) Bristol City | Until end of season | 15 January 2015 | |
| 9 | FW | (France) Andy Delort | (France) Tours | Until end of season | 2 February 2015 | |
| 30 | DF | (Republic of Ireland) Rob Kiernan | (England) Birmingham City | Until end of season | 12 February 2015 | |
| 55 | FW | (Republic of Ireland) Matthew Hamilton | (England) AFC Fylde | Until end of season | 13 February 2015 | |
| 72 | GK | (England) Connor Keane | (England) Newcastle Town | Until end of season | 13 February 2015 | |
| 47 | FW | (England) Ryan Jennings | (England) Accrington Stanley | Until end of season | 26 March 2015 | |

=== Football League Championship ===
| Pos | Team | Pld | W | D | L | GF | GA | GD | Pts | Promotion, qualification or relegation |
|---|---|---|---|---|---|---|---|---|---|---|
| 20 | Brighton & Hove Albion | 46 | 10 | 17 | 19 | 44 | 54 | −10 | 47 | |
| 21 | Rotherham United | 46 | 11 | 16 | 19 | 46 | 67 | −21 | 46 (Note: Rotherham United were deducted three points for fielding an ineligible player.) | |
| 22 | Millwall (R) | 46 | 9 | 14 | 23 | 42 | 76 | −34 | 41 | Relegation to Football League One |
| 23 | Wigan Athletic (R) | 46 | 9 | 12 | 25 | 39 | 64 | −25 | 39 | Relegation to Football League One |
| 24 | Blackpool (R) | 46 | 4 | 14 | 28 | 36 | 91 | −55 | 26 | Relegation to Football League One |

Updated to match(es) played on 2 May 2015. Source: Sky Sports
Rules for classification: 1) Points; 2) Goal difference; 3) Number of goals scored
(R) Relegated

=== Results ===
| Round | 1 | 2 | 3 | 4 | 5 | 6 | 7 | 8 | 9 | 10 | 11 | 12 | 13 | 14 | 15 | 16 | 17 | 18 | 19 | 20 | 21 | 22 | 23 | 24 | 25 | 26 | 27 | 28 | 29 | 30 | 31 | 32 | 33 | 34 | 35 | 36 | 37 | 38 | 39 | 40 | 41 | 42 | 43 | 44 | 45 | 46 |
|---|---|---|---|---|---|---|---|---|---|---|---|---|---|---|---|---|---|---|---|---|---|---|---|---|---|---|---|---|---|---|---|---|---|---|---|---|---|---|---|---|---|---|---|---|---|---|
| Ground | H | A | A | H | H | A | A | H | A | H | A | H | H | A | H | A | A | H | A | H | A | H | A | H | A | H | H | A | H | A | A | H | H | A | A | H | A | H | H | A | H | A | A | H | H | A |
| Result | D | L | L | W | W | L | D | L | L | D | D | D | D | W | D | L | L | D | L | L | L | L | W | L | L | D | L | D | L | L | W | L | L | W | W | L | W | L | D | L | L | D | L | W | L | L |
| Position | 11 | 21 | 18 | 18 | 12 | 16 | 16 | 17 | 18 | 21 | 21 | 19 | 19 | 19 | 18 | 19 | 21 | 23 | 23 | 23 | 23 | 23 | 22 | 23 | 23 | 23 | 23 | 23 | 23 | 23 | 23 | 23 | 23 | 23 | 22 | 22 | 22 | 22 | 22 | 23 | 23 | 22 | 23 | 23 | 23 | 23 |

Updated to match(es) played on 2 May 2015. Source: BBC Sport
A = Away; H = Home; W = Win; D = Draw; L = Loss

== Match details ==
=== Pre-season matches ===
| 5 July 2014 | TSV Havelse | 1–3 | Wigan Athletic | Hanover, Germany |
| 14:00 BST | El-Helwe 3' | Report | Jennings 14'; Fortuné 32'; McClean 72' | Stadium: Willhelm-Langrehr-Stadion; Attendance: 477 |

| 11 July 2014 | Wigan Athletic | 0–0 | Walsall | Wigan, England |
| 19:00 BST | | Report | | Stadium: Christopher Park |

| 15 July 2014 | Wigan Athletic | 2–1 | Beşiktaş | Wigan, England |
| 19:00 BST | Waghorn 31', 53' (pen.) | Report | Köybaşı 34' | Stadium: DW Stadium; Attendance: 5,049 |

| 19 July 2014 | Rochdale | 2–1 | Wigan Athletic | Rochdale, England |
| 15:00 BST | Henderson 5'; Hery 37' | Report | Tavernier 45' | Stadium: Spotland Stadium; Attendance: (450 away) |

| 26 July 2014 | Fortuna Düsseldorf | 4–1 | Wigan Athletic | Germany |
| 18:00 BST | Hoffer 34', 52'; Bolly 63'; Benschop 83' | Report | Riera 24' (pen.) | Stadium: TBA; Attendance: 3,439 (71 away) |

| 1 August 2014 | Paderborn | 0–1 | Wigan Athletic | Paderborn, Germany |
| 19:00 BST | | Report | Perch 20' | Stadium: Benteler Arena; Attendance: 4,829 (84 away) |

=== Championship ===
The fixtures for the 2014–15 season were announced on 18 June 2014 at 9am.

| 9 August 2014 1 | Wigan Athletic | 2–2 | Reading | Wigan |
| 15:00 | McManaman 27'; Taylor (yellow card) 74'; McArthur 90+3' | Report | Cummings (yellow card) 58' (goal) 71'; Morrison 77' | Stadium: DW Stadium; Attendance: 12,174; Referee: Mark Brown |

| 16 August 2014 2 | Charlton Athletic | 2–1 | Wigan Athletic | Charlton |
| 15:00 | Cousins 8'; Moussa 90+3' | Report | McManaman 22'; Taylor (yellow card) 25' | Stadium: The Valley; Attendance: 15,334; Referee: Andy D'Urso |

| 19 August 2014 3 | Cardiff City | 1–0 | Wigan Athletic | Cardiff |
| 19:45 | Nicky Maynard 53'; Adeyemi (yellow card) 66' | Report | | Stadium: Cardiff City Stadium; Attendance: 20,662; Referee: Robert Madley |

| 23 August 2014 4 | Wigan Athletic | 1–0 | Blackpool | Wigan |
| 15:00 | Riera 35' | Report | | Stadium: DW Stadium; Attendance: 12,113; Referee: Carl Boyeson |

| 30 August 2014 5 | Wigan Athletic | 4–0 | Birmingham City | Wigan |
| 15:00 | McManaman 9', 45+1'; Taylor 39'; Waghorn 78' | Report | | Stadium: DW Stadium; Attendance: 11,708; Referee: David Webb |

| 13 September 2014 6 | Blackburn Rovers | 3–1 | Wigan Athletic | Blackburn |
| 15:00 | Marshall 53', 82'; Rhodes 56' | Report | Perch 51' | Stadium: Ewood Park; Attendance: 15,782; Referee: Roger East |

| 16 September 2014 7 | Huddersfield Town | 0–0 | Wigan Athletic | Huddersfield |
| 19:45 | | Report | | Stadium: John Smith's Stadium; Attendance: 11,083; Referee: Seb Stockbridge |

| 20 September 2014 8 | Wigan Athletic | 1–2 | Ipswich Town | Wigan |
| 15:00 | Waghorn 82' | Report | Hyam 20'; Sammon 63' | Stadium: DW Stadium; Attendance: 12,817; Referee: Andy Woolmer |

| 27 September 2014 9 | AFC Bournemouth | 2–0 | Wigan Athletic | Bournemouth |
| 15:00 | Elphick (yellow card) 29'; Arter (yellow card) 31'; Kermorgant 36'; Francis 70' | Report | Cowie (yellow card) 45+2' | Stadium: Dean Court; Attendance: 8,754; Referee: Gary Sutton |

| 30 September 2014 10 | Wigan Athletic | 0–0 | Nottingham Forest | Wigan |
| 19:45 | Huws (yellow card) 89' | Report | Lansbury (yellow card) 26'; Mancienne (yellow card) 52'; Hunt (yellow card) 85' | Stadium: DW Stadium; Attendance: 14,078; Referee: Kevin Wright |

| 4 October 2014 11 | Wolverhampton Wanderers | 2–2 | Wigan Athletic | Wolverhampton |
| 15:00 | Edwards 30'; Sako (yellow card) 54' (goal) 64'; Batth (yellow card) 74' | Report | Ramis (yellow card) 17'; Huws (yellow card) 21'; Perch 32'; Kvist (yellow card) 40'; Fortuné 45+2'; McManaman (yellow card) 88' | Stadium: Molineux Stadium; Attendance: 21,288; Referee: Andy Davies |

| 18 October 2014 12 | Wigan Athletic | 0–0 | Brentford | Wigan |
| 15:00 | McClean (yellow card) 27'; Ramis (yellow card) 62' | Report | Judge (yellow card) 37'; Craig (yellow card) 62'; Tarkowski (yellow card) 62'; Douglas (yellow card) 76'; McCormack (yellow card) 84' | Stadium: DW Stadium; Attendance: 12,061; Referee: Tony Harrington |

| 22 October 2014 13 | Wigan Athletic | 0–0 | Millwall | Wigan |
| 19:45 | | Report | Wilkinson (yellow card) 82'; Dunne (yellow card) 72'; McDonald (yellow card) 85' | Stadium: DW Stadium; Attendance: 10,210; Referee: Eddie Ilderton |

| 25 October 2014 14 | Derby County | 1–2 | Wigan Athletic | Derby |
| 15:00 | John Eustace 45+3'; Keogh (yellow card) 20' | Report | James McClean 69', 83'; McManaman (yellow card) 20'; Forshaw (yellow card) 57'; Figueroa (yellow card) 74'; Espinoza (yellow card) 88'; Fortuné (yellow card) 95+3' | Stadium: iPro Stadium; Attendance: 28,824; Referee: Bobby Madley |

| 1 November 2014 15 | Wigan Athletic | 3–3 | Fulham | Wigan |
| 15:00 GMT | Forshaw 9' (pen.); McManaman (yellow card) 22'; Espinoza 54'; McClean (yellow card) 77'; Maloney 82'; Barnett (red card) 85' | Report | Christensen 30'; Bodurov (yellow card) 32'; Ruiz 36', 88' (pen.); Ross McCormack (yellow card) 72' (red card) 77' | Stadium: The DW Stadium; Attendance: 12,084; Referee: James Adcock |

| 4 November 2014 16 | Brighton & Hove Albion | 1–0 | Wigan Athletic | Brighton |
| 19:45 | Gardner 1' | Report | Forshaw (yellow card) 70'; Waghorn (yellow card) 79' | Stadium: Falmer Stadium; Attendance: 23,044; Referee: Lee Collins |

| 7 November 2014 17 | Bolton Wanderers | 3–1 | Wigan Athletic | Bolton |
| 20:00 GMT | Danns (yellow card) 36'; Clayton 50'; Davies 55'; Lee Chung-yong 61' (pen.) | Report | Barnett (yellow card) 61'; McManaman 79'; McCann (yellow card) 86'; McClean (yellow card) 87' | Stadium: Macron Stadium; Attendance: 17,282; Referee: Scott Duncan |

| 22 November 2014 18 | Wigan Athletic | 1–1 | Middlesbrough | Wigan |
| 15:00 | Maloney 24'; McCann (yellow card) 49'; Boyce (yellow card) 66' | Report | Bamford 57'; Clayton (yellow card) 23'; Adomah (yellow card) 62' | Stadium: DW Stadium; Attendance: 16,347; Referee: David Webb |

| 29 November 2014 19 | Sheffield Wednesday | 2–1 | Wigan Athletic | Sheffield |
| 19:45 GMT | May 27', 71'; Loovens (yellow card) 45'; Semedo (yellow card) 52'; Palmer (yellow card) 90+3' | Report | McCann 26'; Ramis (yellow card) 43'; Barnett (yellow card) 62' | Stadium: Hillsborough; Attendance: 20,609; Referee: Chris Kavanagh |

| 6 December 2014 20 | Wigan Athletic | 0–1 | Norwich City | Wigan |
| 15:00 GMT | | Report | Howson 5' | Stadium: DW Stadium; Attendance: 11,475; Referee: Oliver Langford |

| 13 December 2014 21 | Watford | 2–1 | Wigan Athletic | Watford |
| 15:00 GMT | Deeney 20', 82'; Abdi (yellow card) 53'; Tözsér (yellow card) 76' | Report | McManaman (yellow card) 20'; McCann 45+1' | Stadium: Vicarage Road; Attendance: 15,297; Referee: Mark Haywood |

| 20 December 2014 22 | Wigan Athletic | 1–2 | Rotherham United | Wigan |
| 15:00 GMT | McCann (yellow card) 47'; Watson 63'; McClean (yellow card) 69' | Report | Paul Green (yellow card) 34'; Lawrence 39'; Lawrence (yellow card) 42'; Wooton (yellow card) 59'; Revell 64'; Taylor (yellow card) 89' | Stadium: DW Stadium; Attendance: 12,641; Referee: Keith Stroud |

| 26 December 2014 23 | Leeds United | 0–2 | Wigan Athletic | Leeds |
| 15:00 GMT | Bellusci (yellow card) 85' | Report | Cooper 11' (o.g.); McClean 83' (yellow card) 85' | Stadium: Elland Road; Attendance: 28,375; Referee: Nigel Miller |

| 30 December 2014 24 | Wigan Athletic | 0–1 | Sheffield Wednesday | Wigan |
| 19:45 | Kiernan (yellow card) 25'; McManaman (red card) 68' | Report | Semedo (yellow card) 72'; Nuhiu 77' (yellow card) 90+3'; Maguire (yellow card) 84' | Stadium: DW Stadium; Attendance: 14,571; Referee: Dean Whitestone |

| 10 January 2015 25 | Birmingham City | 3–1 | Wigan Athletic | Birmingham |
| 15:00 | Donaldson 2', 14', 64' | Report | McCann (yellow card) 4'; McClean 36' | Stadium: St Andrew's; Attendance: 16,117; Referee: Mick Russell |

| 17 January 2014 26 | Wigan Athletic | 1–1 | Blackburn Rovers | Wigan |
| 15:00 | McClean (yellow card) 45+3'; Waghorn (yellow card) 59'; McClean 43'; Perch (yellow card) 68' | Report | Evans 15'; Hanley (yellow card) 45+3'; Marshall (yellow card) 70'; Evans (yellow card) 76' | Stadium: DW Stadium; Attendance: 14,652; Referee: Mike Jones |

| 24 January 2015 27 | Wigan Athletic | 0–1 | Huddersfield Town | Wigan |
| 15:00 | Kvist (yellow card) 23'; Ridgewell (yellow card) 53'; Delort (yellow card) 90+1' | Report | Coady 82' | Stadium: DW Stadium; Attendance: 12,064; Referee: Stephen Martin |

| 30 January 2015 28 | Ipswich Town | 0–0 | Wigan Athletic | Ipswich |
| 15:00 | Smith (yellow card) 30' | Report | Kvist (yellow card) 34'; McClean (yellow card) 39'; Perch (yellow card) 79' | Stadium: Portman Road; Attendance: 19,155; Referee: Charles Breakspear |

| 7 February 2015 29 | Wigan Athletic | 1–3 | AFC Bournemouth | Wigan |
| 15:00 | Clarke 60'; McCann (yellow card) 75'; McClean (yellow card) 80'; Taylor (yellow card) 90+2' | Report | Wilson 37', 57'; Kermorgant 41'; Richie (yellow card) 67'; Pugh (yellow card) 86' | Stadium: DW Stadium; Attendance: 10,621; Referee: Mark Haywood |

| 11 February 2015 30 | Nottingham Forest | 3–0 | Wigan Athletic | Nottingham |
| 19:45 | Assombalonga 33'; Burke 50'; Lansbury 61' | Report | | Stadium: City Ground; Attendance: 19,619; Referee: Oliver Langford |

| 17 February 2015 31 | Reading | 0–1 | Wigan Athletic | Reading |
| 19:45 | Pearce (yellow card) 90+2' | Report | Pearce 17' (yellow card) 61'; Herd (yellow card) 48'; Clarke (yellow card) 62'; Ojo (yellow card) 70'; Taylor (yellow card) 85'; Kim Bo-kyung (yellow card) 90+1' | Stadium: Madejski Stadium; Attendance: 14,601; Referee: Simon Hooper |

| 20 February 2015 32 | Wigan Athletic | 0–3 | Charlton Athletic | Wigan |
| 19:45 | McClean (yellow card) 43' | Report | Buyens (yellow card) 13'; Bulot 17'; Vetokele 45+2' (yellow card) 50'; Eagles 88' | Stadium: DW Stadium; Attendance: 11,344; Referee: Chris Kavanagh |

| 24 February 2015 33 | Wigan Athletic | 0–1 | Cardiff City | Wigan |
| 19:45 | Perch (yellow card) 56'; Maguire (yellow card) 88' | Report | Gunnarsson 20' (yellow card) 52'; Connolly (yellow card) 90+1' | Stadium: DW Stadium; Attendance: 10,016; Referee: Andy Woolmer |

| 28 February 2015 34 | Blackpool | 1–3 | Wigan Athletic | Blackpool |
| 15:00 | O'Hara (yellow card) 26'; McMahon (yellow card) 50'; Madine 85' | Report | Kim Bo-kyung 45'; Maguire 67'; Perch (yellow card) 74'; McClean 79'; Clarke (yellow card) 89' | Stadium: Bloomfield Road; Attendance: 11,679; Referee: Keith Stroud |

| 4 March 2015 35 | Norwich City | 0–1 | Wigan Athletic | Norwich |
| 19:45 | Howson (yellow card) 33'; Olsson (yellow card) 42'; Jerome (yellow card) 63'; Martin (yellow card) 90+1' | Report | Kim Bo-kyung 8'; Pennant (yellow card) 45+2'; Pearce (yellow card) 66'; Waghorn (yellow card) 90+5' | Stadium: Carrow Road; Attendance: 26,208; Referee: Gavin Ward |

| 7 March 2015 36 | Wigan Athletic | 0–1 | Leeds United | Wigan |
| 15:00 | Pearce (yellow card) 90+5' | Report | Mowatt 51'; Murphy (yellow card) 39'; Bamba (yellow card) 57'; Sharp (yellow card) 68'; Wootton (yellow card) 86' | Stadium: DW Stadium; Attendance: 16,163; Referee: Geoff Eltringham |

| 14 March 2015 37 | Rotherham United | 1–2 | Wigan Athletic | Rotherham |
| 15:00 | Broadfoot (yellow card) 30'; Derbyshire 45+1' | Report | McClean (yellow card) 30'; Pennant 30', 35' | Stadium: New York Stadium; Attendance: 10,062; Referee: James Linington |

| 17 March 2015 38 | Wigan Athletic | 0–2 | Watford | Wigan |
| 19:45 | Perch (yellow card) 74' | Report | Guedioura (yellow card) 18'; Forestieri (yellow card) 53'; Deeney 54', 90' (pen.) | Stadium: DW Stadium; Attendance: 10,684; Referee: David Coote |

| 21 March 2015 39 | Wigan Athletic | 1–1 | Bolton Wanderers | Wigan |
| 15:00 | Maguire (yellow card) 40'; Waghorn 90+3' | Report | Walker 69'; Davies (yellow card) 74' | Stadium: DW Stadium; Attendance: 15,861; Referee: Nigel Miller |

| 3 April 2015 40 | Middlesbrough | 1–0 | Wigan Athletic | Middlesbrough |
| 15:00 | Bamford 20'; Gibson (yellow card) 60'; Tomlin (yellow card) 86'; Clayton (yellow card) 90+2' | Report | Maguire (yellow card) 23'; Perch (yellow card) 40'; McClean (yellow card) 56'; Waghorn (yellow card) 76' | Stadium: Riverside Stadium; Attendance: 23,082; Referee: Stuart Attwell |

| 6 April 2015 41 | Wigan Athletic | 0–2 | Derby County | Wigan |
| 15:00 | Boyce (yellow card) 53'; Clarke (yellow card) 70' | Report | Martin 51'; Hendrick (yellow card) 58'; Hughes (yellow card) 74'; Bent 81' | Stadium: DW Stadium; Attendance: 14,697; Referee: Simon Hooper |

| 10 April 2015 42 | Fulham | 2–2 | Wigan Athletic | London |
| 20:00 BST | McCormack 4'; Burn (yellow card) 27'; Smith 35'; Kavanagh (yellow card) 45' | Report | Pennant 22'; Pearce 69' | Stadium: Craven Cottage; Attendance: 15,994; Referee: Mick Russell |

| 14 April 2015 43 | Millwall | 2–0 | Wigan Athletic | Millwall |
| 19:45 | Gregory (yellow card) 29'; Martin (yellow card) 53'; Bailey (yellow card) 63'; Beevers (yellow card) 63'; Abdou 74'; Upson (red card) 78'; Gueye 90+2' | Report | Bong (yellow card) 29'; Waghorn (red card) 60'; Bo-Kyung (yellow card) 63'; Pearce (red card) 78' | Stadium: The Den; Attendance: 8,494; Referee: Steve Martin |

| 18 April 2015 44 | Wigan Athletic | 2–1 | Brighton & Hove Albion | Wigan |
| 15:00 | Chow 26'; Perch 81' | Report | Stephens (yellow card) 37'; Holla (yellow card) 50'; Stephens 55'; Halford (yellow card) 90+1' | Stadium: DW Stadium; Attendance: 11,100; Referee: Keith Hill |

| 25 April 2015 45 | Wigan Athletic | 0–1 | Wolverhampton Wanderers | Wigan |
| 15:00 | Boyce (yellow card) 24'; Bong (yellow card) 59'; McClean (yellow card) 65' (yellow-red card) 90+5'; Fortuné (yellow card) 89' | Report | Afobe 24'; Dicko (yellow card) 64'; Stearman (yellow card) 80' | Stadium: DW Stadium; Attendance: 16,810; Referee: James Linington |

| 2 May 2015 46 | Brentford | 3–0 | Wigan Athletic | Brentford |
| 12:45 | Pritchard 35'; Jota 46'; Gray 80' | Report | Bong (yellow card) 51'; Maquire (yellow card) 71' | Stadium: Griffin Park; Attendance: 11,842; Referee: Andy Woolmer |

=== League Cup ===
The draw for the first round was made on 17 June 2014 at 10am. Wigan Athletic were drawn at away to Burton Albion.

| 12 August 2014 Round One | Burton Albion | 2–1 | Wigan Athletic | Burton upon Trent |
| 19:45 | Akins (yellow card) 44'; Knowles 45+2'; Beavon 52' | Report | Fortuné 27'; Al Habsi (yellow card) 42'; Waghorn (yellow card) 86' | Stadium: Pirelli Stadium; Attendance: 2,602 (677 away); Referee: Pat Miller |

=== FA Cup ===
The draw for the third round was made on 8 December 2014 at 7pm. Wigan Athletic were drawn away to local rivals Bolton Wanderers.

| 3 January 2015 Third Round | Bolton Wanderers | 1–0 | Wigan Athletic | Bolton |
| 15:00 GMT | Vela (yellow card) 74'; Clough 76' | Report | | Stadium: Macron Stadium; Attendance: 16,788 (3,594 away); Referee: Phil Dowd |

== Squad statistics ==
Statistics accurate as of 2 May 2015

| No. | Pos. | Name | League | | FA Cup | | League Cup | | Total | | Discipline | |
| No. | Pos. | Name | Apps | Goals | Apps | Goals | Apps | Goals | Apps | Goals | Yellow card | Red card |
Goalkeepers
| 1 | GK | Scott Carson | 34 | 0 | 0 | 0 | 0 | 0 | 34 | 0 | 0 | 0 |
| 13 | GK | Lee Nicholls | 1 | 0 | 0 | 0 | 0 | 0 | 1 | 0 | 0 | 0 |
| 26 | GK | Ali Al-Habsi | 11 | 0 | 1 | 0 | 1 | 0 | 13 | 0 | 0 | 0 |
Defenders
| 3 | DF | Andrew Taylor | 28 | 1 | 1 | 0 | 0 | 0 | 28 | 1 | 4 | 0 |
| 4 | DF | Harry Maguire | 16 | 1 | 0 | 0 | 0 | 0 | 16 | 1 | 4 | 0 |
| 17 | DF | Emmerson Boyce | 26 (1) | 0 | 0 (1) | 0 | 0 | 0 | 26 (2) | 0 | 3 | 0 |
| 20 | DF | Gaetan Bong | 13 | 0 | 0 | 0 | 0 | 0 | 13 | 0 | 3 | 0 |
| 22 | DF | Aaron Taylor-Sinclair | 0 | 0 | 0 | 0 | 1 | 0 | 1 | 0 | 0 | 0 |
| 23 | DF | Juan Carlos García | 0 | 0 | 0 | 0 | 0 | 0 | 0 | 0 | 0 | 0 |
| 24 | DF | James Perch | 40 (2) | 3 | 1 | 0 | 0 | 0 | 41 (2) | 3 | 7 | 0 |
| 25 | DF | Leon Barnett | 16 (4) | 0 | 0 | 0 | 1 | 0 | 17 (4) | 0 | 2 | 1 |
| 28 | DF | Jason Pearce | 15 | 2 | 0 | 0 | 0 | 0 | 15 | 2 | 2 | 1 |
| 30 | DF | Rob Kiernan | 16 (1) | 0 | 1 | 0 | 0 | 0 | 17 (1) | 0 | 1 | 0 |
Midfielders
| 7 | CM | Chris McCann | 12 (6) | 2 | 1 | 0 | 0 | 0 | 13 (6) | 2 | 4 | 0 |
| 11 | LM | James McClean | 30 (6) | 6 | 1 | 0 | 0 | 0 | 31 (6) | 6 | 12 | 1 |
| 14 | MF | Emyr Huws | 15 (1) | 0 | 0 | 0 | 0 | 0 | 15 (1) | 0 | 3 | 0 |
| 15 | MF | Jermaine Pennant | 12 (1) | 3 | 0 | 0 | 0 | 0 | 12 (1) | 3 | 1 | 0 |
| 16 | MF | Kim Bo-kyung | 17 (1) | 2 | 0 | 0 | 0 | 0 | 17 (1) | 2 | 1 | 0 |
| 18 | MF | Sheyi Ojo | 7 (4) | 0 | 0 | 0 | 0 | 0 | 7 (4) | 0 | 1 | 0 |
| 19 | CM | Don Cowie | 24 (8) | 0 | 0 | 0 | 0 | 0 | 24 (9) | 0 | 1 | 0 |
| 27 | MF | Josh Murphy | 2 (3) | 0 | 0 | 0 | 0 | 0 | 2 (3) | 0 | 0 | 0 |
| 36 | MF | William Kvist | 18 (8) | 0 | 0 | 0 | 0 | 0 | 18 (8) | 0 | 3 | 0 |
| 39 | MF | Tim Chow | 3 (1) | 1 | 0 | 0 | 0 | 0 | 3 (1) | 1 | 0 | 0 |
Attackers
| 10 | ST | Billy McKay | 1 (8) | 0 | 0 | 0 | 0 | 0 | 1 (8) | 0 | 0 | 0 |
| 31 | ST | Jerome Sinclair | 0 (1) | 0 | 0 | 0 | 0 | 0 | 0 (1) | 0 | 0 | 0 |
| 32 | ST | Marc-Antoine Fortuné | 26 (8) | 1 | 1 | 0 | 1 | 1 | 28 (8) | 2 | 2 | 0 |
| 33 | ST | Martyn Waghorn | 6 (17) | 3 | 0 | 0 | 1 | 0 | 7 (17) | 3 | 6 | 1 |
| 42 | ST | Grant Holt | 0 | 0 | 0 | 0 | 0 (1) | 0 | 0 (1) | 0 | 0 | 0 |
Players that played for Wigan this season that have left the club:
| 16 | CM | James McArthur | 5 | 1 | 0 | 0 | 0 | 0 | 5 | 1 | 1 | 0 |
| 31 | DF | Maynor Figueroa | 7 | 0 | 0 | 0 | 0 | 0 | 7 | 0 | 1 | 0 |
| 18 | CM | Roger Espinoza | 6 (6) | 1 | 0 | 0 | 1 | 0 | 7 (6) | 1 | 1 | 0 |
| 9 | ST | Oriol Riera | 5 (7) | 1 | 0 | 0 | 0 | 0 | 5 (7) | 1 | 0 | 0 |
| 2 | DF | James Tavernier | 7 (4) | 0 | 1 | 0 | 1 | 0 | 8 (4) | 0 | 0 | 0 |
| 8 | CM | Ben Watson | 7 (2) | 1 | 1 | 0 | 0 | 0 | 8 (2) | 1 | 0 | 0 |
| 10 | CM | Shaun Maloney | 10 (10) | 2 | 0 (1) | 0 | 1 | 0 | 11 (11) | 2 | 0 | 0 |
| 29 | MF | Adam Forshaw | 13 (3) | 1 | 1 | 0 | 0 | 0 | 14 (3) | 1 | 2 | 0 |
| 15 | RM | Callum McManaman | 18 (4) | 5 | 0 | 0 | 0 | 0 | 18 (4) | 5 | 6 | 1 |
| 4 | DF | Iván Ramis | 17 (1) | 0 | 1 | 0 | 1 | 0 | 19 (1) | 0 | 3 | 0 |
| 20 | CM | Fraser Fyvie | 0 | 0 | 0 | 0 | 1 | 0 | 1 | 0 | 0 | 0 |
| 49 | ST | Andy Delort | 4 (8) | 0 | 0 | 0 | 0 | 0 | 4 (8) | 0 | 2 | 0 |
| 27 | DF | Liam Ridgewell | 6 | 0 | 0 | 0 | 0 | 0 | 6 | 0 | 1 | 0 |
| 8 | DF | Chris Herd | 3 | 0 | 0 | 0 | 0 | 0 | 3 | 0 | 1 | 0 |
| 6 | DF | Thomas Rogne | 0 | 0 | 0 | 0 | 1 | 0 | 1 | 0 | 0 | 0 |
| 21 | ST | Leon Clarke | 8 (1) | 1 | 0 | 0 | 0 | 0 | 8 (1) | 1 | 3 | 0 |

=== Top scorers ===
Statistics accurate as of 2 May 2015

| Position | Number | Name | Championship | FA Cup | League Cup | Total |
|---|---|---|---|---|---|---|
| MF | 11 | James McClean | 6 | 0 | 0 | 6 |
| MF | 15 | Callum McManaman | 5 | 0 | 0 | 5 |
| ST | 33 | Martyn Waghorn | 3 | 0 | 0 | 3 |
| MF | 15 | Jermaine Pennant | 3 | 0 | 0 | 3 |
| DF | 24 | James Perch | 3 | 0 | 0 | 3 |
| MF | 10 | Shaun Maloney | 2 | 0 | 0 | 2 |
| MF | 7 | Chris McCann | 2 | 0 | 0 | 2 |
| MF | 16 | Kim Bo-kyung | 2 | 0 | 0 | 2 |
| DF | 28 | Jason Pearce | 2 | 0 | 0 | 2 |
| ST | 32 | Marc-Antoine Fortuné | 1 | 0 | 1 | 2 |
| MF | 16 | James McArthur | 1 | 0 | 0 | 1 |
| ST | 9 | Oriol Riera | 1 | 0 | 0 | 1 |
| DF | 3 | Andrew Taylor | 1 | 0 | 0 | 1 |
| MF | 29 | Adam Forshaw | 1 | 0 | 0 | 1 |
| MF | 18 | Roger Espinoza | 1 | 0 | 0 | 1 |
| MF | 8 | Ben Watson | 1 | 0 | 0 | 1 |
| ST | 21 | Leon Clarke | 1 | 0 | 0 | 1 |
| DF | 4 | Harry Maguire | 1 | 0 | 0 | 1 |
| MF | 39 | Tim Chow | 1 | 0 | 0 | 1 |
| Own goals | | | 1 | 0 | 0 | 1 |
| Total | | | 39 | 0 | 1 | 40 |
