= James McClean =

Irish footballer (born 1989)

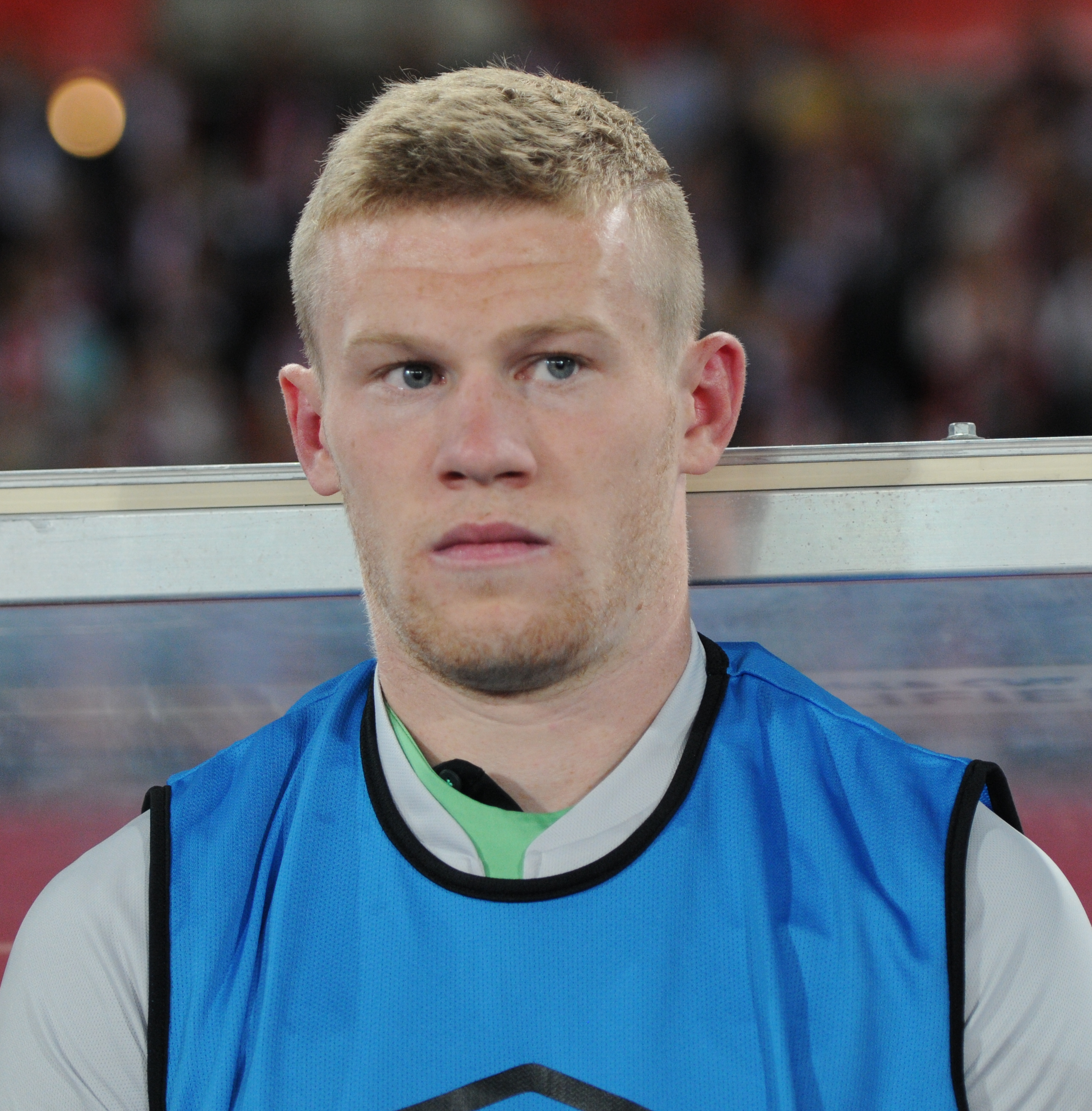
- McClean with the Republic of Ireland in 2013

Personal information
- Full name: James Joseph McClean
- Date of birth: 22 April 1989 (age 37)
- Place of birth: Derry, Northern Ireland
- Height: 1.80 m (5 ft 11 in)
- Position: Winger

Youth career
- Trojans
- Institute

Senior career*
Years	Team	Apps	(Gls)
2007–2008	Institute	1	(0)
2008–2011	Derry City	79	(16)
2011–2013	Sunderland	59	(7)
2013–2015	Wigan Athletic	73	(9)
2015–2018	West Bromwich Albion	99	(4)
2018–2021	Stoke City	102	(12)
2021–2023	Wigan Athletic	79	(12)
2023–2026	Wrexham	95	(7)
2026	Derry City	17	(0)

International career^{‡}
2008–2009	Northern Ireland U21	7	(0)
2012–2023	Republic of Ireland	103	(11)
- * Club domestic league appearances and goals as of 13:41, 28 October 2026 (UTC) ‡ National team caps and goals as of 22:26, 21 November 2023 (UTC)

James Joseph McClean (born 22 April 1989) is an Irish professional footballer who plays as a winger. He most recently played for League of Ireland side Derry City.

McClean began his career with Trojans, Institute, and Derry City of his hometown. He signed for Sunderland in England's Premier League in 2011 and moved to Wigan Athletic in August 2013. He spent two seasons at Wigan, claiming their player of the year award in the latter, and then returned to the Premier League by joining West Bromwich Albion in June 2015. McClean spent three season with the Baggies before joining Stoke City in July 2018. McClean re-signed for Wigan Athletic in August 2021 and joined Wrexham two years later.

McClean was born and brought up in Derry and played for the Northern Ireland national under-21 football team, but declined a call-up to the senior squad because he wanted to play for the Republic of Ireland. In February 2012, McClean received international clearance from FIFA which made him eligible to play for the Republic of Ireland, making his debut against the Czech Republic in the same month. He made 103 appearances for the nation over the next 11 years, and represented them at the UEFA European Championship in 2012 and 2016.

== Early life ==
McClean grew up in the Creggan area of Derry and attended Holy Family Primary School and St. Peter's High School. He played Gaelic football with Seán Dolans GAC before concentrating on association football.

== Club career ==
=== Institute ===
McClean began his career at Institute, making one first team appearance as a substitute against Glentoran in the 2007–08 Irish Premier League season. Institute decided not to renew his contract in the summer of 2008.

=== Derry City ===
McClean made his Derry City first team debut on 1 July 2008 in a League Cup tie at home to Bohemians, opening the scoring in a 4–1 win. He made his League of Ireland debut for Derry City as a substitute for Kevin McHugh playing against Cork City at Turner's Cross on 8 September 2008. In his first full season with Derry in the 2009 season the club suffered serious financial problems and the players went weeks without payment. During this period in November 2009 McClean held talks with English League Two side Lincoln City, but this did not result in a contract, after McClean felt homesick. Derry finished the season in 4th place but were expelled by the FAI due to breaking regulations by holding secondary, unofficial contracts with players. They were invited to join the League of Ireland First Division.

In December 2009 McClean was one of the first four players to sign for the new Derry City, along with David McDaid, and the McEleney brothers — Shane and Patrick. McClean scored eight goals in 33 appearances in the 2010 season helping Derry return to the top-flight. McClean began to attract more interest from English clubs in the 2011 season with Peterborough United making some unsuccessful bids. He also attracted interest from both Everton and Celtic. In August 2011 Derry accepted an offer from Sunderland for McClean.

=== Sunderland ===
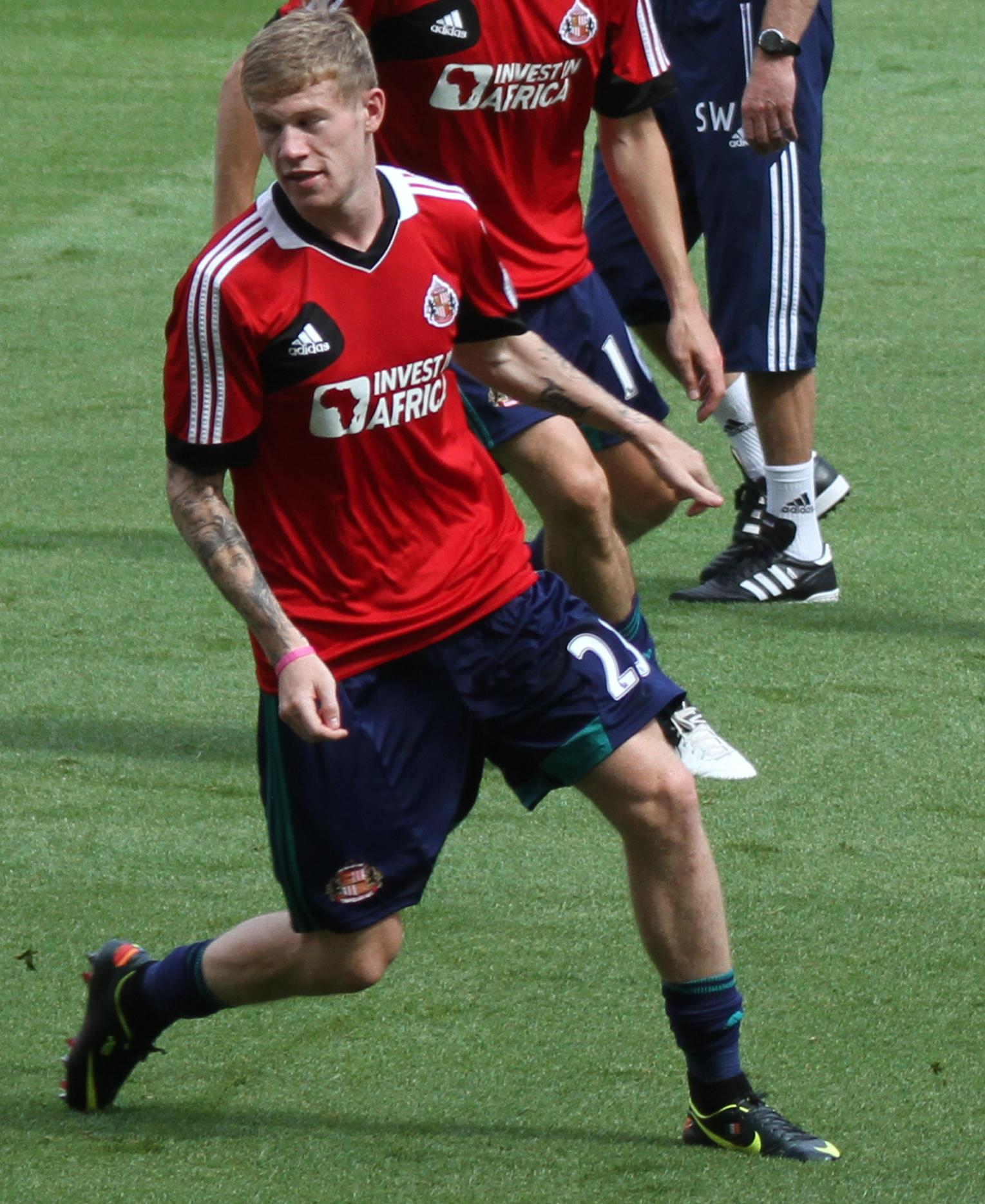
McClean warming up for Sunderland in August 2012.

McClean joined Sunderland on 9 August 2011 for a fee of £350,000, signing a three-year contract. Upon signing McClean, manager Steve Bruce indicated that he was "one for the future", and also hinted that he would be in the reserve team until Christmas. His form in the development squad was capped by a reserve-debut goal in a 4–3 win over Tyne–Wear derby rivals Newcastle United, earning him a place on the Sunderland bench. Despite never making an appearance under Bruce, he made his debut for the first team in Martin O'Neill's first game in charge on 11 December, a 2–1 win over Blackburn Rovers and was credited for the comeback which saw his side overturn a 1–0 deficit, after coming on as a substitute for Jack Colback in the second half.

McClean made his first start for Sunderland in their 1–0 victory over Manchester City on 1 January 2012, and scored his first senior goal for the Black Cats in a 4–1 win against Wigan Athletic two days later; on 8 January, he scored and assisted Sebastian Larsson in a 2–0 win at Peterborough United in the third round of the FA Cup. McClean provided the assist for Stéphane Sessègnon's opening goal in Sunderland's 2–0 victory over Swansea City on 21 January, and got another assist in the equalising goal for Fraizer Campbell in the next round of the cup against Middlesbrough on 29 January. Ahead of the replay for that fixture, Middlesbrough manager Tony Mowbray used McClean as an example for young players to follow. McClean turned provider again in Sunderland's 3–0 victory over Norwich City, assisting Sessègnon's goal, then scored the only goal in a win over Stoke City on 4 February in snowy conditions at the Britannia Stadium. A week later, he opened the scoring in Sunderland's 2–1 home loss to Arsenal after Per Mertesacker injured himself. On 23 March, Sunderland announced that McClean had signed a new contract intended to force him to stay at the club until the summer of 2015. A day later, he helped them to a 3–1 victory over relegation-threatened Queens Park Rangers by assisting the opening goal for Nicklas Bendtner and later scoring by himself. McClean won Sunderland's Young Player of the Year Award, at the end of the 2011–12 season.

In August 2012, McClean scored his first two goals of the 2012–13 in the second round of the League Cup against Morecambe. He also scored in the third round as well, scoring in the 82nd minute away at Milton Keynes Dons. He scored his first Premier League goal of the season in a 3–0 home defeat of Reading on 11 December, exactly twelve months to the day that he made his Sunderland debut. McClean fell out of favour with the Sunderland supporters after he refused to wear a poppy in the run-up to Remembrance Day, which led to his departure in August 2013. Speaking in 2015 McClean says he was 'hung out to dry' by Sunderland.

=== Wigan Athletic ===
McClean signed for Championship club Wigan Athletic on a three-year contract on 8 August 2013. Three days later he made his debut in the 2013 FA Community Shield at Wembley Stadium, starting in a 2–0 loss to Manchester United.

He scored his first goal for Wigan on 26 January 2014 in the FA Cup fourth round, a winner in a 2–1 victory against Crystal Palace. He had scored on 18 December against Sheffield Wednesday, but that match was abandoned in heavy rain and his goal was struck from the records; it was the only goal of the game by the 59th minute in which it was called off. McClean played in 49 matches in 2013–14, scoring four goals as Wigan reached the Championship play-offs where they lost 2–1 to Queens Park Rangers. In 2014–15, Wigan finished in 23rd place and were relegated to League One.

=== West Bromwich Albion ===
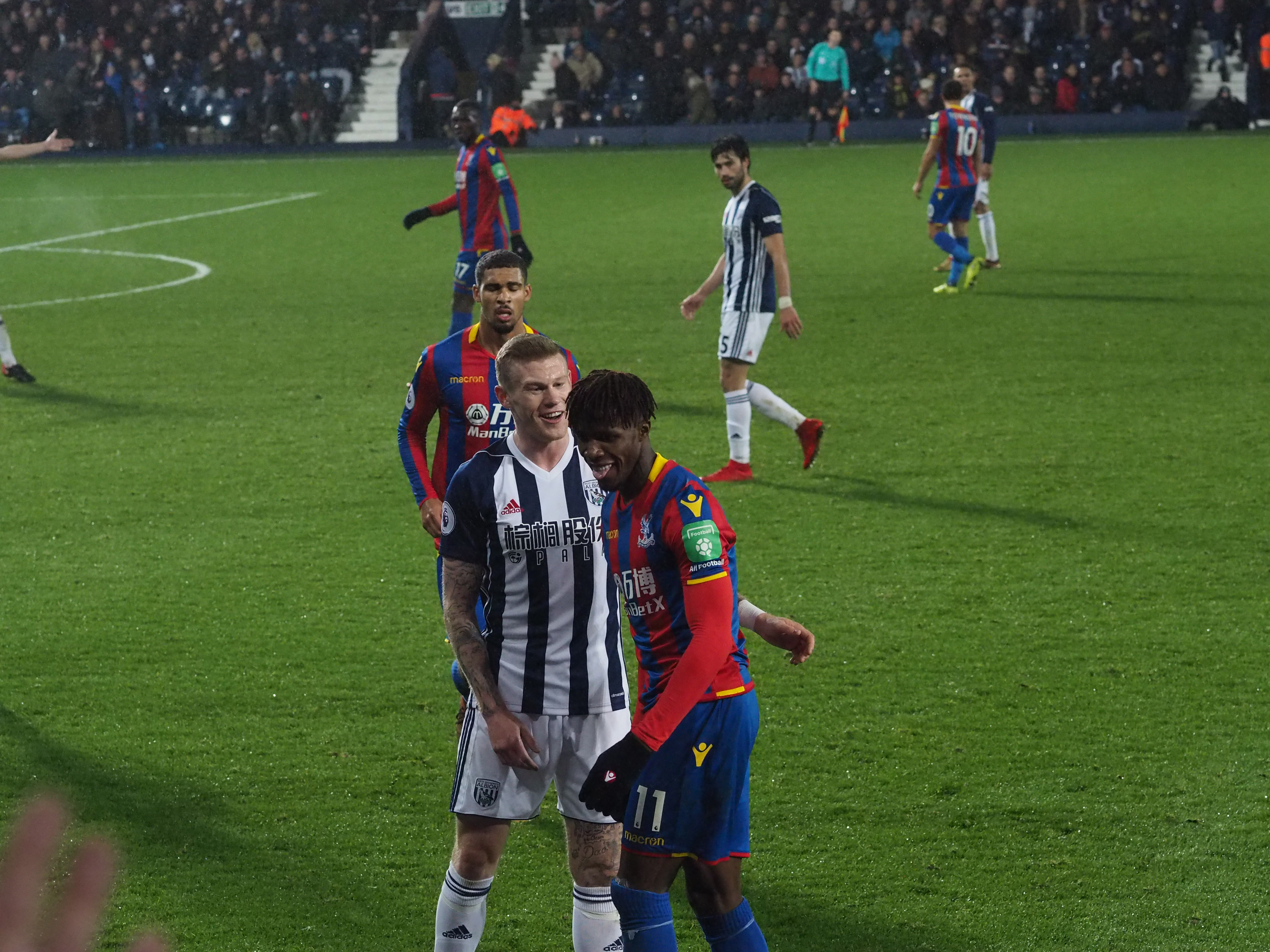
McClean (left) playing for West Bromwich Albion, 2017

Turning down a move to New York Red Bulls, on 22 June 2015 McClean signed for West Bromwich Albion on a three-year deal for a fee believed to be around £1.5 million. In July, on the team's tour of the United States, he turned his back on the Flag of England while the British national anthem "God Save the Queen" was played before a match against the Charleston Battery, which resulted in a verbal warning from manager Tony Pulis.

He made his competitive debut on 10 August as West Brom began the season against Manchester City at The Hawthorns. Booed by his team's own fans whenever he touched the ball, he was replaced by Claudio Yacob at half-time, as his team lost 3–0. On 17 October, after a 1–0 home win over his former team Sunderland, he taunted the visiting fans, leading to confrontations between both sets of players; he was given a warning by the FA over his conduct. He scored his first goal for the Baggies on 5 December, a 39th-minute headed equaliser in a 1–1 home draw against Tottenham Hotspur. Two weeks later, he was sent off in the first half of a 2–1 home loss to Bournemouth for a challenge on Adam Smith; teammate Salomón Rondón was also dismissed in added time. He played in 42 matches in 2015–16 as West Brom finished in 14th position.

He scored his first goal of the 2016–17 season in the EFL Cup against Northampton Town. His first league goal of the season came in a 4–2 win over West Ham United on 17 September 2016. He was given an improved contract extension until 2019, with the option of a further year. Tony Pulis said: "James thoroughly deserves this and has worked hard to achieve it." He angered Watford captain Troy Deeney with his tackling in a 3–1 win on 3 December 2016. He played 42 times as the Baggies finished in 10th. The 2017–18 season was an unsettled one for West Brom as they went through four managers Tony Pulis, Gary Megson, Alan Pardew and Darren Moore. Albion were rock bottom of the Premier League nearly all season and despite a late resurgence they were relegated to the Championship.

=== Stoke City ===
McClean joined Stoke City in July 2018 on a four-year contract for a fee of £5 million. McClean made his Stoke debut on 5 August 2018 against Leeds United. He scored his first goal for Stoke on 25 August 2018 in a 2–0 win against Hull City. In September 2018 McClean suffered a broken arm whilst on international duty with Ireland. McClean played 45 times in 2018–19, scoring three goals as Stoke finished in 16th place. McClean began the 2019–20 season playing as a makeshift left-back as Nathan Jones attempted to implement his preferred diamond formation. It did not work as Stoke had a poor start to the season, failing to win any of their first ten matches and Jones was replaced by Michael O'Neill in November who played McClean in his natural left-wing position. McClean became a key player under O'Neill and his form helped the team pick up results to move out of the relegation zone. He ended the campaign with seven goals from 37 appearances as Stoke avoided relegation and finished in 15th position. Following the end of the season he was voted Player of the Year by supporters.

In March 2020, McClean uploaded an Instagram post in which he said he was giving his children a history lesson, while wearing a balaclava, which some viewers believed to be in reference to the Irish Republican Army (IRA). McClean was fined two weeks' wages by Stoke, apologised, and agreed to delete his account. McClean said in 2023 that he regretted the upload.

In the 2020–21 season, McClean made 29 appearances, scoring two goals as Stoke finished in 14th position. During the season McClean had disciplinary problems as he breached COVID-19 protocols by going to a gym during lockdown. He also angered O'Neill in March 2021 after he played for Ireland despite recovering from a foot injury.

=== Return to Wigan Athletic ===
On 17 August 2021 McClean re-joined Wigan Athletic on a one-year contract. McClean claimed he turned down Bolton Wanderers in order to sign for Wigan. However, Bolton Manager Ian Evatt stated this was false; Bolton had no interest in signing McClean, and McClean's agent had rung daily for three weeks begging Bolton to give him a contract. On 16 October he scored twice in a 4–0 win against Bolton with the match nearly being abandoned after he scored when Bolton fans threw bottles and other objects at him, followed by Wigan fans ripping down advertising boards, the match stopping for more than 10 minutes as police dealt with the situation. Having been promoted as Champions, McClean signed a new one-year contract extension at the end of the 2021–22 season. His first goal of the new season came on 6 August 2022, in a 1–1 draw away to Norwich City at Carrow Road.

=== Wrexham ===
On 4 August 2023, it was announced that McClean had signed for EFL League Two side Wrexham for an undisclosed fee. McClean's first season with the club saw him make 44 appearances in all competitions, scoring 3 goals as his side were promoted to EFL League One following their second placed season. He signed a new contract with Wrexham to the end of the 2025–26 season. In the 2024–25 League One season, McClean made 42 appearances, scored 4 goals, played approximately 3,407 minutes, and received 11 yellow cards.

McClean was named club captain for Wrexham for the 2024–25 season. On 16 January 2025, in a 2–1 loss away to local rivals Shrewsbury Town, stewards made a human wall between home fans and McClean when he went to take a throw-in, and objects were launched in his direction. The English Football League investigated the incidents, banned several Shrewsbury fans from the club, and charged them with criminal offences. McClean called the town of Shrewsbury a "cesspit full of inbreds" in online comments that he later deleted.

On 26 April 2025, he captained the side to promotion to the EFL Championship, after their 3–0 win at home to Charlton Athletic confirmed them as 2024–25 EFL League One runners-up to earn their third consecutive promotion.

On 8 August 2025, McClean extended his contract with the club until 2027.

=== Return to Derry City ===
On 17 January 2026, McClean returned to his hometown club Derry City on a multi-year contract, joining his brother Patrick who signed for the club the day before. On 31 January 2026, McClean made his second debut for Derry, providing the assist for Darragh Markey's winner in a 1–0 victory over Shamrock Rovers in the 2026 President of Ireland's Cup at Tallaght Stadium. Having made 11 appearances in all competitions, McClean revealed the day after his 37th birthday in April 2026 that he had suffering from hip issues for several years, that he had recently been told by a specialist that he had "no business being on a football pitch" and that he believed he would require surgery if he was to continue his playing career, with a trip to England for a final assessment set to determine the outcome. A few days later he revealed a positive outcome from the assessment stating "I was expecting surgery or retirement but that wasn't the case. He gave me a bit of hope. He gave me an injection and that should hopefully give me a wee bit of relief and in about a month to six weeks time, make me feel a wee bit like a footballer again".

In June 2026, McClean voiced his discontent at the move to the club so far, stating that although his family were enjoying being back home in Derry, he was not. While working as a pundit on RTÉ, he stated that "You have a lot of conversations on the phone, and then you come home and quickly realise that what you hear on the phone is not what you see in reality. There are a lot of factors that have contributed to that. I'm going to leave them for another day."

In late July 2026 after the club's European campaign ended with McClean making just a single 7 minute cameo appearance across the four fixtures and was left out of the squad for the final game, he again came out with some cryptic criticism which was widely thought to be aimed at the club's manager Tiernan Lynch, posting on his Instagram story "If you watch the games, the lads aren't losing these games based on lack of effort. So clearly there is an issue somewhere. Rovers, Bohs, Shels, Larne have all progressed through ties in Europe this year. We played four, lost four, and sorry, it needs to be said, we have every much as good, if not better, a squad on paper." In their next game following his comments, on 2 August 2026, he was again left out of the squad for a 1–1 draw away to St Patrick's Athletic, after which Lynch refused to answer questions from the media when asked about McClean's comments on the "issues at the club". That proved to be Lynch's final game at the club as he was sacked 3 days later. He remained out of the squad for the following game under interim manager Mark Connolly, posting a photo on Instagram of him watching his former side Wrexham's match at home on television rather than watching or attending his own club's 2–0 win at home to Sligo Rovers, with reports that his future at the club was uncertain. On 10 August 2026, it was reported that the club were considering terminating McClean's contract over his physical condition, though he still attended training the following day. On 10 August 2026, it was reported that the club were looking to cancel his contract over his physical condition though McClean still attended training the following day. A day later, it was reported that the club had withdrawn a letter threatening termination of his contract. With his last appearance having come in mid-July 2026, Connolly confirmed in September that McClean would not feature for the club again that season, at least. On 28 October 2026, a week before the 2026 FAI Cup final, it was announced that McClean had left the club by mutual consent, three months after his last appearance, with both McClean and club chairman Philip O'Doherty wishing each other well in their statements.

== International career ==
McClean had represented Northern Ireland at a number of junior levels, but ultimately opted to represent the Republic of Ireland at senior level.

=== Northern Ireland ===
McClean was part of the Northern Ireland team that won the 2008 Milk Cup and scored in the opening game in a 3–1 win against the US. He has also represented Northern Ireland seven times at Under 21 level. On 26 July 2011 he was called up to the Northern Ireland senior squad for the match against the Faroe Islands on 10 August 2011. McClean decided to wait for selection by the Republic of Ireland and therefore pulled out of the Northern Ireland squad. In January 2012 he again confirmed he would not be reconsidering his decision although Northern Ireland manager Michael O'Neill had been in contact with him.

=== Republic of Ireland ===
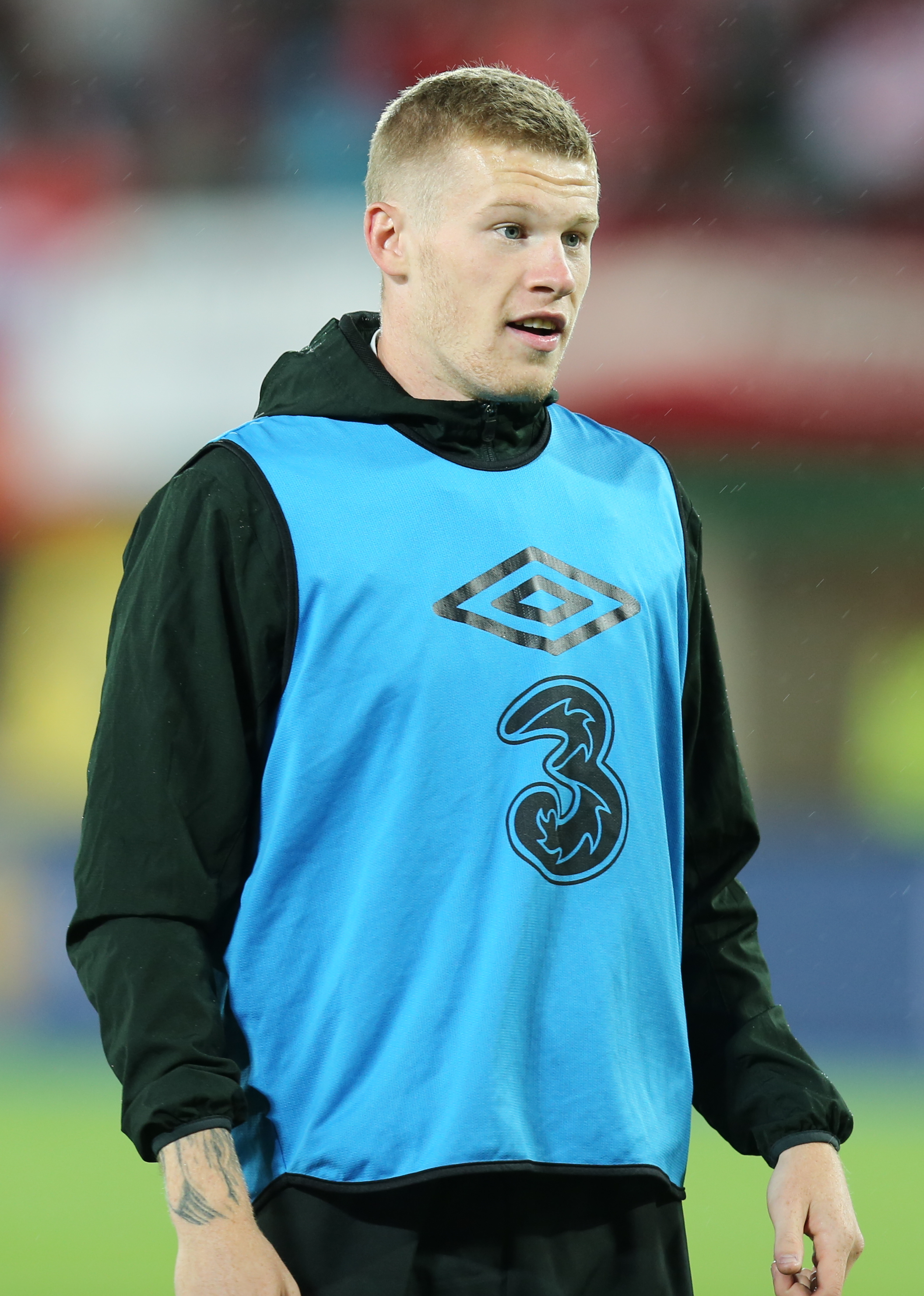
McClean warming up for the Republic of Ireland, September 2013.

McClean's success in the Premier League saw increasing calls for Giovanni Trapattoni to select him for the Republic of Ireland, with Sunderland manager Martin O'Neill saying after McClean's winning goal at Stoke: "I think he's more than capable of going to Euro 2012 ... Hopefully he's making such an impact he'll be watched by someone in the Ireland camp, even if it's not Trapattoni. They couldn't fail to be impressed." McClean received international clearance to play for the Republic of Ireland on 9 February. However, he was not included in the squad for the match against the Czech Republic which was announced the next day, though he was added to the squad on 20 February after success against Arsenal in the FA Cup fifth round proper.

McClean made his international debut on 29 February 2012, coming on in the 78th minute for Aiden McGeady in a friendly against the Czech Republic at the Aviva Stadium. On 7 May 2012, manager Giovanni Trapattoni confirmed that McClean was part of the Republic of Ireland UEFA Euro 2012 squad. He then received sectarian abuse and death threats via Twitter. McClean was quoted saying, "You are looking around as a Catholic and seeing all the Union Jacks and listening to the fans' songs and I just didn't feel at home at all." On 26 May 2012, McClean made his first senior international start against Bosnia and Herzegovina in the final home friendly ahead of UEFA Euro 2012, playing on the left flank.

At UEFA Euro 2012 Poland, McClean was left on the bench for the first game, a 3–1 defeat to Croatia. Republic of Ireland manager Trapattoni hinted that McClean would not feature in the next game against world and European champions Spain. After much public urging for him to make use of McClean's talents to recover the Republic's progress in the European Championship, Trapattoni claimed that "His time would come in the future". McClean appeared as a substitute against Spain, coming on in the 76th minute in Gdańsk.

After being left on the bench during the Republic of Ireland's 2–1 victory over Kazakhstan in a World Cup 2014 qualifier on 7 September 2012, McClean used Twitter to criticise Trapattoni. The tweet, and McClean's account, were subsequently deleted and the winger was forced to apologise to teammates.

On 11 June 2014, McClean scored his first international goal in the 5–1 defeat by Portugal in the MetLife Stadium during the Republic's US tour. He made his first appearance of the UEFA Euro 2016 qualifying campaign on 11 October against Gibraltar, scoring a brace in a 7–0 win in the Aviva Stadium.

McClean scored his first ever professional penalty on 29 March 2016, helping Ireland to a 2–2 draw in a friendly against Slovakia. On 9 October 2017, he scored the only goal of a win away to Wales at the Cardiff City Stadium in 2018 FIFA World Cup qualification, putting the Irish into the playoffs.

On 16 November 2020, the Football Association of Ireland announced that McClean had tested positive for COVID-19 after playing a full game against Wales at the Cardiff City Stadium. The announcement also included Matt Doherty's positive result.

On 14 June 2022, on his 94th cap for the Republic of Ireland, he captained his country for the first time, in a 1–1 draw with Ukraine in a UEFA Nations League game at the LKS Stadium in Poland. On 19 June 2023, McClean became the 7th player to make 100 international appearances for the Republic of Ireland in a 3–0 home win against Gibraltar in the Euro 2024 qualification.

In October 2023, McClean announced he would retire from the national team following the match against New Zealand on 21 November.

== Personal life ==
He is the older brother of fellow professional footballer Patrick McClean. McClean began a relationship with Erin Connor in 2010. They married in 2016, in their hometown of Derry. As of February 2023, they have three daughters and a son. One of McClean's daughters has autism and McClean revealed in a social media post that he had also been diagnosed with autism. He highlighted in his statement that he went public with the diagnosis in order to support his daughter during World Autism Acceptance Week.

In 2013, McClean, then of Sunderland, attracted criticism when he wrote a tweet naming "The Broad Black Brimmer" as his favourite song by the Irish rebel band the Wolfe Tones. The song is associated with physical force Irish republicanism. As a result of his tweet, his club manager, Martin O'Neill, advised him to stop using Twitter.

Since his move to English football in 2012, McClean and his family have received anti-Irish abuse, both in person and on social media.

In November 2018, Chris McGimpsey, a Belfast City Council member from the Ulster Unionist Party, referred to McClean as a "super Provo" during a debate on BBC Radio Ulster; the epithet refers to supporters of the Provisional Irish Republican Army. McGimpsey apologised to McClean, admitted what he said was false, and agreed to pay damages in March 2019. In September 2019, the High Court of Northern Ireland ordered McGimpsey to pay McClean £63,000 in damages and legal costs.

=== Remembrance poppy controversy ===
From his Premier League breakthrough in 2012 to 2026, McClean has been both condemned and supported for his refusal to wear football shirts bearing the symbol of the remembrance poppy when playing games on or around Remembrance Day (11 November) or Remembrance Sunday (the nearest Sunday), leading to his being named by the BBC in 2015 as the main example for one of the "Five reasons people don't wear poppies". The special shirts, usually auctioned, are part of the annual Poppy Appeal organised by the Royal British Legion, with all Premier League club shirts displaying poppies in various forms since 2010.

McClean stated his objection derives from his affinity with Derry and to the role of the British Army in the Troubles. He grew up on the Creggan estate, where six of the men shot dead on Bloody Sunday in 1972 came from. He stated he would wear the poppy if it were restricted to honouring only soldiers who died in the World Wars, many of whom, particularly during World War I, were Irish, and has insisted his position was one of peace, and not any kind of wider political, religious or anti-British point. The Legion opposes compelling people to wear the poppy, seeing such a stance as going against everything the poppy symbolises.

For his stances, McClean has been booed by supporters of opposition clubs as well as some of his own club's supporters. After the first refusal, McClean was subjected to sectarian abuse and loyalist threats, including death threats.

Various players, such as David Meyler and Jamie Devitt (both Irish citizens) and managers (including Trapattoni), have voiced support for his decision as a personal issue of conscience. The first instance occurred on 10 November 2012, with McClean wearing a plain Sunderland shirt during their match against Everton. McClean donated his unadorned shirt, signed, to a charity auction in aid of a Dublin-based children's charity.

=== Philanthropy ===
McClean has made a number of charitable donations. He made a significant donation to homeless people at the Wells and Foyle Valley House in Derry. He donated £1,500 for a custom hand cycle bike to help a child who had spina bifida. He made another significant donation to the Wells facility in the Bogside, for up to 24 men who have alcohol problems. He paid £1,750 for a new mobile home after hearing about a pregnant homeless woman's struggles on social media. He donated £1,000 to help pay for specialist proton therapy in Florida for a four-year-old child with cancer. He donated €1,200 to help pay for the funeral of a two-year-old boy who was struck by a car. In December 2016 he set up a new clothing line with proceeds going to help homeless residents of his native Derry. He donated £500 to an online fund set up to support the family of a missing Derry man.

== Career statistics ==
=== Club ===
As of match played 19 July 2026

Appearances and goals by club, season and competition
Club	Season	League			National cup (Note: Includes Irish Cup, FAI Cup, FA Cup)		League cup (Note: Includes Northern Ireland Football League Cup, League of Ireland Cup, EFL Cup)		Europe		Other		Total	
Club	Season	Division	Apps	Goals	Apps	Goals	Apps	Goals	Apps	Goals	Apps	Goals	Apps	Goals
Institute	2007–08	Irish Premier League	1	0	0	0	0	0	—		—		1	0
Derry City	2008	LOI Premier Division	1	0	0	0	1	1	—		0	0	2	1
Derry City	2009	LOI Premier Division	27	1	2	0	1	0	—		0	0	30	1
Derry City	2010	LOI First Division	30	8	2	0	1	0	—		—		33	8
Derry City	2011	LOI Premier Division	21	7	1	0	1	1	—		—		23	8
Derry City	Total		79	16	5	0	4	2	—		0	0	88	18
Sunderland	2011–12	Premier League	23	5	6	1	0	0	—		—		29	6
Sunderland	2012–13	Premier League	36	2	2	0	3	3	—		—		41	5
Sunderland	Total		59	7	8	1	3	3	—		—		70	11
Wigan Athletic	2013–14	Championship	37	3	5	1	0	0	5 (Note: Appearances in UEFA Europa League)	0	2 (Note: One appearance in FA Community Shield; one appearance in 2014 Championship play-offs)	0	49	4
Wigan Athletic	2014–15	Championship	36	6	1	0	0	0	—		—		37	6
Wigan Athletic	Total		73	9	6	1	0	0	5	0	2	0	86	10
West Bromwich Albion	2015–16	Premier League	35	2	5	0	2	0	—		—		42	2
West Bromwich Albion	2016–17	Premier League	34	1	1	0	1	1	—		—		36	2
West Bromwich Albion	2017–18	Premier League	30	1	2	0	2	0	—		—		34	1
West Bromwich Albion	Total		99	4	8	0	5	1	—		—		112	5
Stoke City	2018–19	Championship	42	3	2	0	1	0	—		—		45	3
Stoke City	2019–20	Championship	36	7	0	0	1	0	—		—		37	7
Stoke City	2020–21	Championship	24	2	1	0	4	0	—		—		29	2
Stoke City	Total		102	12	3	0	6	0	—		—		111	12
Wigan Athletic	2021–22	League One	33	9	2	0	1	0	—		1 (Note: Appearances in EFL Trophy)	1	37	10
Wigan Athletic	2022–23	Championship	46	3	2	0	0	0	—		—		48	3
Wigan Athletic	Total		79	12	4	0	1	0	—		1	1	85	13
Wrexham	2023–24	League Two	37	3	4	0	1	0	—		2	1	44	4
Wrexham	2024–25	League One	42	4	1	0	1	0	—		1	0	45	4
Wrexham	2025–26	Championship	16	0	1	0	2	0	—		—		19	0
Wrexham	Total		95	7	6	0	4	0	—		3	1	108	8
Derry City	2026	LOI Premier Division	17	0	1	0	—		1	0	1 (Note: Appearance in President of Ireland's Cup)	0	20	0
Career total			604	67	39	2	23	6	6	0	7	2	681	77

=== International ===
As of match played 21 November 2023

Appearances and goals by national team and year
National team	Year	Apps	Goals
Republic of Ireland	2012	6	0
Republic of Ireland	2013	12	0
Republic of Ireland	2014	9	4
Republic of Ireland	2015	7	0
Republic of Ireland	2016	13	4
Republic of Ireland	2017	10	2
Republic of Ireland	2018	6	0
Republic of Ireland	2019	9	0
Republic of Ireland	2020	5	0
Republic of Ireland	2021	11	1
Republic of Ireland	2022	8	0
Republic of Ireland	2023	7	0
Total		103	11

Scores and results list Republic of Ireland's goal tally first, score column indicates score after each McClean goal.

List of international goals scored by James McClean
No.	Date	Venue	Opponent	Score	Result	Competition
1	10 June 2014	MetLife Stadium, East Rutherford, United States	Portugal	1–3	1–5	Friendly
2	11 October 2014	Aviva Stadium, Dublin, Ireland	Gibraltar	4–0	7–0	UEFA Euro 2016 qualification
3	11 October 2014	Aviva Stadium, Dublin, Ireland	Gibraltar	6–0	7–0	UEFA Euro 2016 qualification
4	18 November 2014	Aviva Stadium, Dublin, Ireland	United States	3–1	4–1	Friendly
5	29 March 2016	Aviva Stadium, Dublin, Ireland	Slovakia	2–1	2–2	Friendly
6	9 October 2016	Zimbru Stadium, Chișinău, Moldova	Moldova	2–1	3–1	2018 FIFA World Cup qualification
7	9 October 2016	Zimbru Stadium, Chișinău, Moldova	Moldova	3–1	3–1	2018 FIFA World Cup qualification
8	12 November 2016	Ernst-Happel-Stadion, Vienna, Austria	Austria	1–0	1–0	2018 FIFA World Cup qualification
9	4 June 2017	Aviva Stadium, Dublin, Ireland	Uruguay	3–1	3–1	Friendly
10	9 October 2017	Cardiff City Stadium, Cardiff, Wales	Wales	1–0	1–0	2018 FIFA World Cup qualification
11	30 March 2021	Nagyerdei Stadion, Debrecen, Hungary	Qatar	1–0	1–1	Friendly

== Honours ==
Derry City

- League of Ireland First Division: 2010
- President of Ireland's Cup: 2026

Wigan Athletic

- EFL League One: 2021–22

Wrexham

- EFL League Two second-place promotion: 2023–24
- EFL League One second-place promotion: 2024–25

Individual

- PFAI First Division Team of the Year: 2010
- Sunderland Young Player of the Year: 2011–12
- Wigan Player of the Year: 2014–15, 2022–23
- RTÉ Sports Person of the Year: 2017
- Stoke City Player of the Year: 2019–20
- EFL League One Team of the Year: 2021–22

== See also ==
- List of Republic of Ireland international footballers born outside the Republic of Ireland
- List of men's footballers with 100 or more international caps
