= Patrick McClean =

Footballer from Northern Ireland (born 1996)

Personal information
- Full name: Patrick McClean
- Date of birth: 22 November 1996 (age 29)
- Place of birth: Derry, Northern Ireland
- Height: 1.88 m (6 ft 2 in)
- Position: Defender

Team information
- Current team: Derry City
- Number: 3

Youth career
- –2014: Derry City

Senior career*
| Years | Team | Apps | (Gls) |
| 2015–2016 | Derry City | 14 | (1) |
| 2017 | Waterford | 23 | (2) |
| 2018 | Sligo Rovers | 27 | (1) |
| 2019 | Derry City | 10 | (1) |
| 2019–2023 | Glentoran | 118 | (8) |
| 2023–2025 | Glentoran | 46 | (4) |
| 2025–2026 | Sligo Rovers | 14 | (2) |
| 2026– | Derry City | 29 | (1) |
- * Club domestic league appearances and goals as of 14:20, 28 October 2026 (UTC)

Patrick McClean (born 22 November 1996) is a professional footballer from Northern Ireland, who plays as a defender for League of Ireland Premier Division club Derry City. His previous clubs are Waterford, Glentoran and Sligo Rovers.

== Club career ==
=== Youth career ===
Derry native McClean was raised in the Creggan area of the city and came through the Derry City academy, with his first involvement at first team level coming when he was named on the bench against Galway United on 6 February 2015.

=== Derry City ===
McClean made his senior debut for Derry City on 18 September 2015, replacing Ryan McBride from the bench in the 82nd minute of a 1–0 win at home to Shamrock Rovers. On 16 April 2016, he scored his first goal in senior football, with a 35-yard equaliser in a 1–1 draw away to Longford Town.

=== Waterford ===
On 4 January 2017, McClean signed for League of Ireland First Division club Waterford on a 1-year contract. He made his debut for the club in a 1–0 loss away to Athlone Town on 24 February 2017 in the first game of the season. His first goal for the club came on 10 March 2017, opening the scoring in a 2–0 win over UCD at the UCD Bowl. He scored 2 goals in 27 appearances in all competitions as the club won the 2017 League of Ireland First Division title to gain promotion to the Premier Division. On 6 November 2017, he signed a new 1-year contract with the club, but departed just 4 months later, a week into the new season.

=== Sligo Rovers ===
On 22 February 2018, McClean signed a 2-year contract with Sligo Rovers after they had agreed an undisclosed fee with Waterford for his signature. He made his debut on 23 February 2018 in a 2–1 win over his hometown club Derry City at The Showgrounds. McClean's first goal for the club came on 15 June 2018, in a 3–0 win away to St Patrick's Athletic at Richmond Park. He scored 1 goal in 33 appearances in all competitions during his first season with the club. On 24 December 2018, the club announced that they had accepted a bid from Derry City for McClean for an undisclosed fee, and that Derry were then free to negotiate a contract with him.

=== Return to Derry City ===
On 3 January 2019, Derry City announced that McClean had returned to his hometown club for an undisclosed fee, 2 years after first departing the club. His returning debut for the club was in a 3–0 win over UCD on 15 February 2019 in the opening game of the season at the Ryan McBride Brandywell Stadium. He struggled for regular game time with the club, making just 10 appearances, scoring once, midway through the season, which resulted in him departing the club for more regular game time.

=== Glentoran ===
On 28 July 2019, McClean signed for NIFL Premiership club Glentoran, after rejecting fellow Belfast club Cliftonville who were also after his signature. On 9 August 2019, he made his debut for the club in a 1–1 draw away to Glenavon at Mourneview Park. He scored his first goal for the club on 21 September 2019, with an injury time match winning header in a 2–1 victory at home to Warrenpoint Town. On 31 July 2020, he played the full 120 minutes as his side beat Ballymena United 2–1 after extra time at Windsor Park to win the 2019–20 Irish Cup. He made his career debut in European football on 20 August 2020, in a 1–0 win over Faroese club HB in the UEFA Europa League. On 12 February 2023, McClean announced his retirement from football aged 26 with immediate effect, stating in a social media post "I’ve decided to call it a day on my football career. It's not been an easy decision but it's the one that I've been thinking about for a while now. I've had a good journey and met some amazing people that will be friends for life and worked with some top players/coaches. Thank you to everyone who's been a part of it, over and out." He later stated that he had several reasons for retiring from football, including becoming bit disillusioned with the game amidst upheaval at the club after manager Rodney McAree had taken over from Mick McDermott, as well as issues in his personal life. During his time out of football, he worked on a building site in Dublin with friends.

=== Return to Glentoran ===
On 23 July 2023, McClean returned to Glentoran, just 5 months after announcing his retirement from the game, stating "I want to apologise to the club, to my team mates and especially to the supporters for how I left in February, I know the timing was poor but at the time I had issues in my life that I was struggling with and I couldn’t concentrate on football the way I needed to." On 13 October 2023, he scored his first goal since returning to the club, in a 6–0 win over Loughgall at The Oval. He departed the club in June 2025, stating that it had been a "Real pleasure to play for Glentoran".

=== Return to Sligo Rovers ===
On 21 June 2025, McClean returned to League of Ireland Premier Division club Sligo Rovers for an undisclosed fee, 7 years after his last season with the club, with his 18-month contract set to commence from 1 July. On 12 July 2025, he scored his first goal since returning to the club, in a 2–2 draw with his hometown club Derry City. On 25 July 2025, McClean scored a headed equaliser to help his side come back from 2–0 down to eventually win the game 3–2 away to relegation rivals Cork City at Turners Cross. In January 2026, McClean was subject to a bid from his hometown club Derry City which was rejected by Sligo Rovers, with the club stating that they would only sell McClean for a large fee.

=== Third spell at Derry City ===
On 16 January 2026, it was announced that Derry City had signed McClean for a third spell at the club, signing a two-year-contract for an undisclosed fee. The following day, his brother James signed for the club, making the pair teammates for the first time in their careers. On 8 November 2026, he was named Man of the Match in a 1–0 win over Waterford in the 2026 FAI Cup final at the Aviva Stadium. On 20 November 2026, he signed a contract extension with the club.

== Personal life ==
He is the younger brother of fellow professional footballer James McClean, who has played in the Premier League and for the Republic of Ireland national team.

In April 2025, his club Glentoran launched an investigation after videos of McClean had circulated online of him allegedly attending an Easter Monday parade in Derry that was linked to the New Irish Republican Army.

== Career statistics ==
As of match played on 8 November 2026

Appearances and goals by club, season and competition
| Club | Season | League | | | National Cup (Note: Includes FAI Cup & Irish Cup) | | League Cup (Note: Includes League of Ireland Cup & Northern Ireland Football League Cup) | | Europe | | Other | | Total | |
| Club | Season | Division | Apps | Goals | Apps | Goals | Apps | Goals | Apps | Goals | Apps | Goals | Apps | Goals |
|---|---|---|---|---|---|---|---|---|---|---|---|---|---|---|
| Derry City | 2015 | LOI Premier Division | 2 | 0 | 0 | 0 | 0 | 0 | — | | — | | 2 | 0 |
| Derry City | 2016 | LOI Premier Division | 12 | 1 | 0 | 0 | 1 | 0 | — | | — | | 13 | 1 |
| Derry City | Total | | 14 | 1 | 0 | 0 | 1 | 0 | — | | — | | 15 | 1 |
| Waterford | 2017 | LOI First Division | 23 | 2 | 1 | 0 | 3 | 0 | — | | 0 (Note: Appearances in the Munster Senior Cup) | 0 | 27 | 2 |
| Sligo Rovers | 2018 | LOI Premier Division | 27 | 1 | 1 | 0 | 3 | 0 | — | | 2 (Note: Appearances in the Scottish Challenge Cup) | 0 | 33 | 1 |
| Derry City | 2019 | LOI Premier Division | 10 | 1 | — | | 0 | 0 | — | | — | | 10 | 1 |
| Glentoran | 2019–20 | NIFL Premiership | 28 | 2 | 1 | 0 | 0 | 0 | — | | 0 (Note: Appearances in the County Antrim Shield) | 0 | 29 | 2 |
| Glentoran | 2020–21 | NIFL Premiership | 35 | 2 | 0 | 0 | 0 | 0 | 2 (Note: Appearances in the UEFA Europa League) | 0 | 0 | 0 | 37 | 2 |
| Glentoran | 2021–22 | NIFL Premiership | 35 | 2 | 2 | 0 | 2 | 0 | 2 (Note: Appearances in the UEFA Europa Conference League) | 0 | 2 (Note: Appearances in the 2021–22 NIFL Premiership Playoffs) | 0 | 43 | 2 |
| Glentoran | 2022–23 | NIFL Premiership | 20 | 2 | 1 | 0 | 2 | 2 | — | | 0 | 0 | 23 | 4 |
| Glentoran | Total | | 118 | 8 | 4 | 0 | 4 | 2 | 4 | 0 | 2 | 0 | 132 | 10 |
| Glentoran | 2023–24 | NIFL Premiership | 30 | 3 | 4 | 0 | 1 | 0 | 1 (Note: Appearances in the UEFA Europa Conference League) | 0 | 2 (Note: Appearances in the 2023–24 NIFL Premiership Playoffs) | 0 | 36 | 3 |
| Glentoran | 2024–25 | NIFL Premiership | 16 | 1 | 0 | 0 | 0 | 0 | — | | 0 | 0 | 16 | 1 |
| Glentoran | Total | | 46 | 4 | 4 | 0 | 1 | 0 | — | | 2 | 0 | 53 | 4 |
| Sligo Rovers | 2025 | LOI Premier Division | 14 | 2 | 3 | 0 | — | | — | | — | | 17 | 2 |
| Derry City | 2026 | LOI Premier Division | 29 | 1 | 4 | 1 | — | | 4 (Note: 2 appearances in the UEFA Europa League; 2 appearances in the UEFA Conference League) | 0 | 1 (Note: Appearance in the President of Ireland's Cup) | 0 | 38 | 2 |
| Career total | | | 281 | 20 | 17 | 1 | 12 | 2 | 9 | 0 | 7 | 0 | 326 | 23 |

== Honours ==
Waterford

- League of Ireland First Division: 2017

Glentoran

- Irish Cup: 2019–20

Derry City

- FAI Cup: 2026
- President of Ireland's Cup: 2026
