= Nick Twisk =

Dutch footballer (born 2003)

Personal information
- Date of birth: 13 March 2003 (age 23)
- Place of birth: Egmond aan Zee, Netherlands
- Height: 1.81 m (5 ft 11 in)
- Position: Midfielder

Team information
- Current team: Derry City
- Number: 17

Youth career
- –2014: VV Zeevogels
- 2014–2021: AZ Alkmaar

Senior career*
Years	Team	Apps	(Gls)
2021–2026	Jong AZ	73	(0)
2026–	Derry City	10	(0)

International career^{‡}
2019	Netherlands U17	2	(0)
- * Club domestic league appearances and goals as of 12:14, 9 November 2026 (UTC) ‡ National team caps and goals as of 11:53, 8 July 2026 (UTC)

Nick Twisk (born 13 March 2003) is a Dutch professional footballer who plays as a midfielder for League of Ireland Premier Division club Derry City.

== Career ==
=== Youth career ===
From Egmond aan Zee in North Holland, Twisk transferred from VV Zeevogels to the AZ Youth Academy in 2014 at the age of ten years-old. He played a key part as the AZ Alkmaar under-18 side won a league and cup double in the 2021–22 season. He was also later part of AZ's UEFA Youth League winning team during the 2022–23 season and also played against Boca Juniors in the U20 Intercontinental Cup.

=== Jong AZ ===
Twisk made his professional league debut for Jong AZ in the Eerste Divisie on 30 April 2021 in the 0–1 away match against Roda JC Kerkrade. Twisk was rewarded with a new extended two-year contract in April 2022. In 2024, he signed another two-year contract extension. However, a meniscus injury to his knee sidelined him for a total of 516 days, missing 58 matches. By the 2025–26 season, Twisk was captain of the Jong AZ, and the oldest player in the team, playing in midfield but also occasionally at centre-back.

=== Derry City ===
On 8 July 2026, it was announced that Twisk had signed for League of Ireland Premier Division club Derry City. He made his debut for the club on 9 July 2026 in a 3–2 defeat away to CSKA Sofia in the UEFA Europa League. On 8 November 2026, he was part of the starting XI in a 1–0 win over Waterford in the 2026 FAI Cup final at the Aviva Stadium.

== International career ==
Twisk was capped twice by the Netherlands U17 team twice in 2019.

== Personal life ==
He is the father of a son, Noah.

== Career statistics ==
As of match played 8 November 2026

Appearances and goals by club, season and competition
Club	Season	League			National cup		Europe		Other		Total	
Club	Season	Division	Apps	Goals	Apps	Goals	Apps	Goals	Apps	Goals	Apps	Goals
Jong AZ	2020–21	Eerste Divisie	1	0	—		—		—		1	0
Jong AZ	2021–22	Eerste Divisie	1	0	—		—		—		1	0
Jong AZ	2022–23	Eerste Divisie	25	0	—		—		—		25	0
Jong AZ	2023–24	Eerste Divisie	2	0	—		—		—		2	0
Jong AZ	2024–25	Eerste Divisie	12	0	—		—		—		12	0
Jong AZ	2025–26	Eerste Divisie	32	0	—		—		—		32	0
Jong AZ	Total		73	0	—		—		—		73	0
Derry City	2026	LOI Premier Division	10	0	5	0	4 (Note: 2 appearances in the UEFA Europa League; 2 appearances in the UEFA Conference League)	0	—		19	0
Career total			83	0	5	0	4	0	0	0	92	0

== Honours ==
Derry City

- FAI Cup: 2026
