= Kadell Daniel =

Guyanese footballer (born 1994)

Personal information
- Full name: Kadell Ebony Daniel
- Date of birth: 3 June 1994 (age 32)
- Place of birth: Lambeth, England
- Height: 1.78 m (5 ft 10 in)
- Position: Midfielder

Team information
- Current team: AFC Croydon Athletic

Youth career
- 2010–2013: Crystal Palace
- 2013–2015: Charlton Athletic

Senior career*
Years	Team	Apps	(Gls)
2015	Charlton Athletic	0	(0)
2015	→ Hayes & Yeading United (loan)	3	(0)
2015	→ Torquay United (loan)	7	(2)
2015–2016	Woking	21	(3)
2016	Welling United	16	(3)
2016–2017	Dulwich Hamlet	12	(1)
2016–2017	→ Leatherhead (loan)	13	(4)
2017	Leatherhead	15	(3)
2017–2019	Dover Athletic	57	(2)
2019	→ Margate (loan)	6	(4)
2019–2020	Margate	27	(8)
2020–2021	Kingstonian	7	(1)
2021	Hampton & Richmond Borough	10	(2)
2021–2022	Hayes & Yeading United	25	(4)
2022–2023	Folkestone Invicta	21	(2)
2023–2024	Horsham	23	(7)
2024	Margate	13	(0)
2024–	AFC Croydon Athletic	64	(21)

International career^{‡}
2015	Guyana U23		
2017–	Guyana	26	(3)
- * Club domestic league appearances and goals as of 06:44, 20 March 2026 (UTC) ‡ National team caps and goals as of 06:43, 20 March 2026 (UTC)

Kadell Ebony Daniel (born 3 June 1994) is a professional footballer who plays as a midfielder for Isthmian League South East Division club AFC Croydon Athletic. Born in England, he plays for the Guyana national team.

== Club career ==
Daniel started his career with local side Crystal Palace and appeared as an unused substitute in an FA Cup tie in January 2012, against Derby County, in which Palace lost 1–0, courtesy of a goal by Theo Robinson. On 4 September 2013, after rejecting a new deal at Crystal Palace, Daniel joined Championship side Charlton Athletic on a one-year deal, with an option of an extra year.

After failing to make an impression within his first two years at the club, Daniel was sent out on loan to Hayes & Yeading United on a one-month loan in February 2015. On 14 February 2015, Daniel made his Hayes & Yeading United debut in a 1–1 draw against Bromley, featuring for 83 minutes before being replaced by Rhys Murrell-Williamson. On 26 March 2015, Daniel joined Conference Premier side Torquay United on loan for the remainder of the 2014–15 campaign. On 4 April 2015, Daniel made his Torquay United debut in a 1–1 draw against Dartford, starting the game before being replaced by Duane Ofori-Acheampong in the 83rd minute. A week later, Daniel scored his first Torquay United goal in a 2–0 home victory over Altrincham, opening the scoring in the 22nd minute. Daniel went onto score once more for Torquay before returning to Charlton at the end of the season.

In August 2015, preceding his release from Charlton, Daniel joined National League side Woking on a one-year deal. On 8 August 2015, Daniel made his Woking debut in a 1–0 away defeat against Tranmere Rovers, replacing Bruno Andrade in the 68th minute. On his second start for the Cards, Daniel scored his first goal in a 5–2 victory over Chester, netting a free-kick to give Woking a 3–0 lead into half-time. A week later, Daniel scored once again in a 1–1 draw against Boreham Wood.

After failing to impress under manager Garry Hill with Woking, he rarely featured and therefore joined National League rivals Welling United on a non-contract deal in January 2016. On 23 January 2016, Daniel made his Welling United in a 2–1 home defeat against Barrow, playing the full 90 minutes. A week later, Daniel scored his first Welling United goal in a 1–1 draw against FC Halifax Town. Daniel went on to score twice more in thirteen appearances for Welling before leaving at the end of the 2015–16 campaign.

After numerous trials for National League clubs including Boreham Wood, Daniel opted to join Isthmian League Premier Division side Dulwich Hamlet in August 2016. On 13 August 2016, Daniel made his Dulwich Hamlet debut in a 2–2 draw against AFC Sudbury, scoring in the 40th minute.

On 28 October 2016, Daniel joined Leatherhead on loan from Dulwich Hamlet. On 5 November 2016, Daniel made his Leatherhead debut in their 3–1 home victory against Lowestoft Town, featuring for the entire 90 minutes. A couple of weeks later, Daniel scored twice in Leatherhead's 5–2 victory over Staines Town. On 31 January 2017, it was announced that Daniel had been released from his contract with Dulwich Hamlet. Preceding his release from Dulwich, Daniel re-joined Leatherhead on a permanent deal.

Daniel joined Dover Athletic on 1 August 2017, after a trial period with the club in which he scored in a 3–0 victory at Deal Town. He made his debut, coming off the bench on the opening day of the season in a 1–0 away victory to Hartlepool United. He scored his first goal for the club in a 2–0 away victory to Aldershot Town where he won the ball on the halfway line ran down the wing before beating Nick Arnold and firing across goal into the far corner past Jake Cole to make it 2–0. The win sent Dover to the top of the National League for the first time in their history.

Daniel signed a new contract with Dover at the end of the season following 2 goals in 39 appearances, but was not a regular in the 2018–19 season, spending time on loan at Isthmian League club Margate. Daniel was released at the end of the season and rejoined Margate.

Proceeding a season back with Margate on a permanent basis, in which he netted twelve times in thirty-five appearances, Daniel joined fellow Isthmian League side, Kingstonian ahead of the 2020–21 campaign.

On 25 May 2021, it was announced that Daniel would join National League South side, Hampton & Richmond Borough.

On 30 November 2021, Daniel returned to Hayes & Yeading United, a club in which he had previously enjoyed a loan spell during the 2014–15 campaign.

On 22 June 2022, Daniel joined Folkestone Invicta for the upcoming season.

Daniel joined Horsham in February 2023. He scored a first half hat-trick in a 4-1 Isthmian League Premier Division win away to Kingstonian.

In January 2024, he returned to Margate.

== International career ==
In May 2015, Daniel received his first call-up for the Guyana U23 squad. Daniel went on to feature numerous times for Guyana U23, before receiving a call-up to the senior squad within the same year. On 25 June 2015, Daniel made his Guyana debut in a 2–0 defeat against Cuba. Daniel made a further appearance in November 2017, whilst at Dover, featuring for the full 90 minutes during Guyana's friendly against Trinidad and Tobago, which resulted in a 1–1 draw. He played in three of the four qualifying matches that took Guyana through to the CONCACAF Gold Cup for the first time in the nation's history, and played in one group match, a draw with Trinidad & Tobago, at the tournament itself.

== Career statistics ==
=== Club ===
As of as of match played 20 March 2026

Appearances and goals by club, season and competition
Club	Season	League			FA Cup		League Cup		Other		Total	
Club	Season	Division	Apps	Goals	Apps	Goals	Apps	Goals	Apps	Goals	Apps	Goals
Charlton Athletic	2014–15	Championship	0	0	0	0	0	0	—		0	0
Hayes & Yeading United (loan)	2014–15	Conference South	3	0	—		—		—		3	0
Torquay United (loan)	2014–15	Conference Premier	7	2	—		—		—		7	2
Woking	2015–16	National League	21	3	1	0	—		0	0	22	3
Welling United	2015–16	National League	16	3	—		—		1 (Note: Appearance(s) in FA Trophy)	0	17	3
Dulwich Hamlet	2016–17	Isthmian League Premier Division	12	1	2	0	—		2 (Note: Appearance(s) in Alan Turvey Trophy)	0	16	1
Leatherhead (loan)	2016–17	Isthmian League Premier Division	13	4	—		—		1	0	14	4
Leatherhead	2016–17	Isthmian League Premier Division	15	3	—		—		—		15	3
Dover Athletic	2017–18	National League	40	2	2	0	—		3	0	45	2
Dover Athletic	2018–19	National League	17	0	2	0	—		2	0	21	0
Dover Athletic	Total		57	2	4	0	—		5	0	66	2
Margate (loan)	2018–19	Isthmian League Premier Division	6	4	—		—		—		6	4
Margate	2019–20	Isthmian League Premier Division	27	8	3	1	—		5 (Note: Three appearances in FA Trophy, two appearances and three goals in Alan Turvey Trophy)	3	35	12
Kingstonian	2020–21	Isthmian League Premier Division	7	1	1	0	—		1	0	9	1
Hampton & Richmond Borough	2021–22	National League South	10	2	2	0	—		0	0	12	2
Hayes & Yeading United	2021–22	Southern League Premier Division South	25	4	—		—		3 (Note: One appearance and one goal in Southern League Cup, two appearances in the Southern League Premier Division South play-offs)	1	28	5
Folkestone Invicta	2022–23	Isthmian League Premier Division	21	2	3	1	—		3 (Note: Two appearances in FA Trophy, one in Southern League Cup)	0	27	3
Horsham	2022–23	Isthmian League Premier Division	11	4	—		—		—		11	4
Horsham	2023–24	Isthmian League Premier Division	12	2	7	1	—		6 (Note: Four appearances in FA Trophy, two appearances in Sussex County Cup)	0	25	3
Horsham	Total		23	6	7	1	—		6	0	36	7
Margate	2023–24	Isthmian League Premier Division	13	0	—		—		0	0	13	0
AFC Croydon Athletic	2024–25	Isthmian League South East Division	26	4	1	0	—		1	0	28	4
AFC Croydon Athletic	2025–26	Isthmian League South East Division	29	11	4	2	0	0	1	1	34	14
Career total			329	59	28	5	0	0	28	4	385	68

=== International ===
As of match played 19 November 2024

Appearances and goals by national team and year
National team	Year	Apps	Goals
Guyana	2017	1	0
Guyana	2018	2	1
Guyana	2019	8	1
Guyana	2021	2	1
Guyana	2023	6	0
Guyana	2024	7	0
Total		26	3

Scores and results list Guyana's goal tally first, score column indicates score after each Daniel goal.

List of international goals scored by Kadell Daniel
No.	Date	Venue	Opponent	Score	Result	Competition
1	13 October 2018	TCIFA National Academy, Providenciales, Turks and Caicos Islands	Turks and Caicos Islands	7–0	8–0	2019–20 CONCACAF Nations League qualifying
2	14 October 2019	Synthetic Track and Field Facility, Leonora, Guyana	Antigua and Barbuda	1–2	1–5	2019–20 CONCACAF Nations League B
3	30 March 2021	Félix Sánchez Olympic Stadium, Santo Domingo, Dominican Republic	Bahamas	2–0	4–0	2022 FIFA World Cup qualification
