= 2026 FAI Cup final =

- Event: 2026 FAI Cup
Derry City	Waterford
1	0
- Date: 8 November 2026
- Venue: Aviva Stadium, Dublin
- Man of the Match: Patrick McClean
- Referee: Kevin O'Sullivan
- Attendance: 36,093

The 2026 FAI Cup final, known as the 2026 Club Orange FAI Cup final for sponsorship reasons, was the final match of the 2026 FAI Cup, the national association football cup of the Republic of Ireland. The final, between Derry City and Waterford, took place on Sunday 8 November 2026 at the Aviva Stadium in Dublin.

Derry City defeated Waterford 1–0 thanks to a goal from Darragh Burns, winning the cup for the 7th time.

== Background ==
The teams had faced each other four times this season. Two of the games had ended in 2–2 draws, with the other games being a 4–2 win for Derry and a 4–2 win for Waterford.

For Derry City, this was be their third FAI Cup final in five seasons. With them winning 4–0 against Shelbourne in 2022, and losing 0–2 to Drogheda United in 2024.

For Waterford this was their first final appearance since 2004. If they won the match it would have been only their third time ever winning the cup, and their first time lifting the FAI Cup trophy since 1980.

=== Route to the final ===
Note: In all results below, the score of the finalist is given first (H: home; A: away).

Derry City		Round	Waterford	
Opponent	Result	Group stage	Opponent	Result
Tolka Rovers	3–0 (H)	Second Round	Cobh Ramblers	2–1 (H)
UCD	2–1 (A)	Third Round	Athlone Town	2–1 (H)
Dundalk	4–2 (H)	Quarter-final	Sligo Rovers	3–0 (H)
Galway United	2–0 (A)	Semi-final	Bohemians	2–0 (A)

== Match ==
=== Summary ===
In the 69th minute, Derry City went in front, Darragh Burns received the ball out on the right and cut in before shooting from just outside the penalty area, left-footed low to the right corner of the net. It was the only goal of the game as Derry City claimed a 7th FAI Cup win.

=== Details ===
8 November 2026
15:00

Derry City	1–0	Waterford
Burns 69'	Report

Aviva Stadium, Ballsbridge, Dublin 4
Attendance: 36,093
Referee: Kevin O'Sullivan

Derry City	Waterford

GK	1	(Republic of Ireland) Brian Maher
RB	23	(Northern Ireland) Cameron Dummigan	(yellow card) 86'
CB	3	(Northern Ireland) Patrick McClean
CB	4	(England) Jamie Stott
LB	19	(England) Brandon Fleming
CM	8	(Republic of Ireland) Adam O'Reilly
CM	17	(Netherlands) Nick Twisk
AM	14	(England) Ellis Chapman	(yellow card) 80'
RW	12	(Republic of Ireland) Darragh Burns		(substituted off) 77'
ST	15	(Republic of Ireland) James Clarke		(substituted off) 85'
LW	7	(Northern Ireland) Michael Duffy (c)
Substitutes:
GK	13	(England) Tom Norcott
DF	22	(Northern Ireland) Conor Barr
DF	25	(Republic of Ireland) Christy Grogan
MF	10	(Republic of Ireland) Darragh Markey
MF	11	(Northern Ireland) Gavin Whyte
MF	21	(Portugal) Kevin dos Santos		(substituted on) 77'
FW	27	(Northern Ireland) Liam Boyce		(substituted on) 85'
FW	29	(England) Tyler Smith
FW	32	(Republic of Ireland) Terence Doherty
Caretaker manager:
(Republic of Ireland) Mark Connolly

GK	1	(Northern Ireland) Stephen McMullan
CB	3	(Republic of Ireland) John Mahon
CB	13	(Republic of Ireland) Kevin Long	(yellow card) 50'
CB	16	(England) Hayden Cann
RM	27	(Norway) Jørgen Voilås		(substituted off) 75'
CM	7	(England) Noah Mawene	(yellow card) 90+2'
CM	8	(Republic of Ireland) Evan McLaughlin		(substituted off) 89'
LM	3	(Portugal) Benny Couto
AM	10	(Republic of Ireland) Conan Noonan
ST	9	(Republic of Ireland) Pádraig Amond (c)
ST	18	(Republic of Ireland) Tommy Lonergan
Substitutes:
GK	21	(Republic of Ireland) Arlo Doherty
DF	6	(England) Joe Ashton
DF	12	(Scotland) Blair McKenzie
DF	32	(Nigeria) Goforth Amedu
DF	50	(Republic of Ireland) Noah O'Brien
DF	56	(Republic of Ireland) Aaron Brennan
MF	15	(Republic of Ireland) Luke Heeney		(substituted on) 89'
MF	17	(Canada) Jordan Faria
MF	27	(Republic of Ireland) Dean McMenamy		(substituted on) 75'
Manager:
(Republic of Ireland) Graham Coughlan
