= Frédéric Bulot =

Gabonese footballer (born 1990)

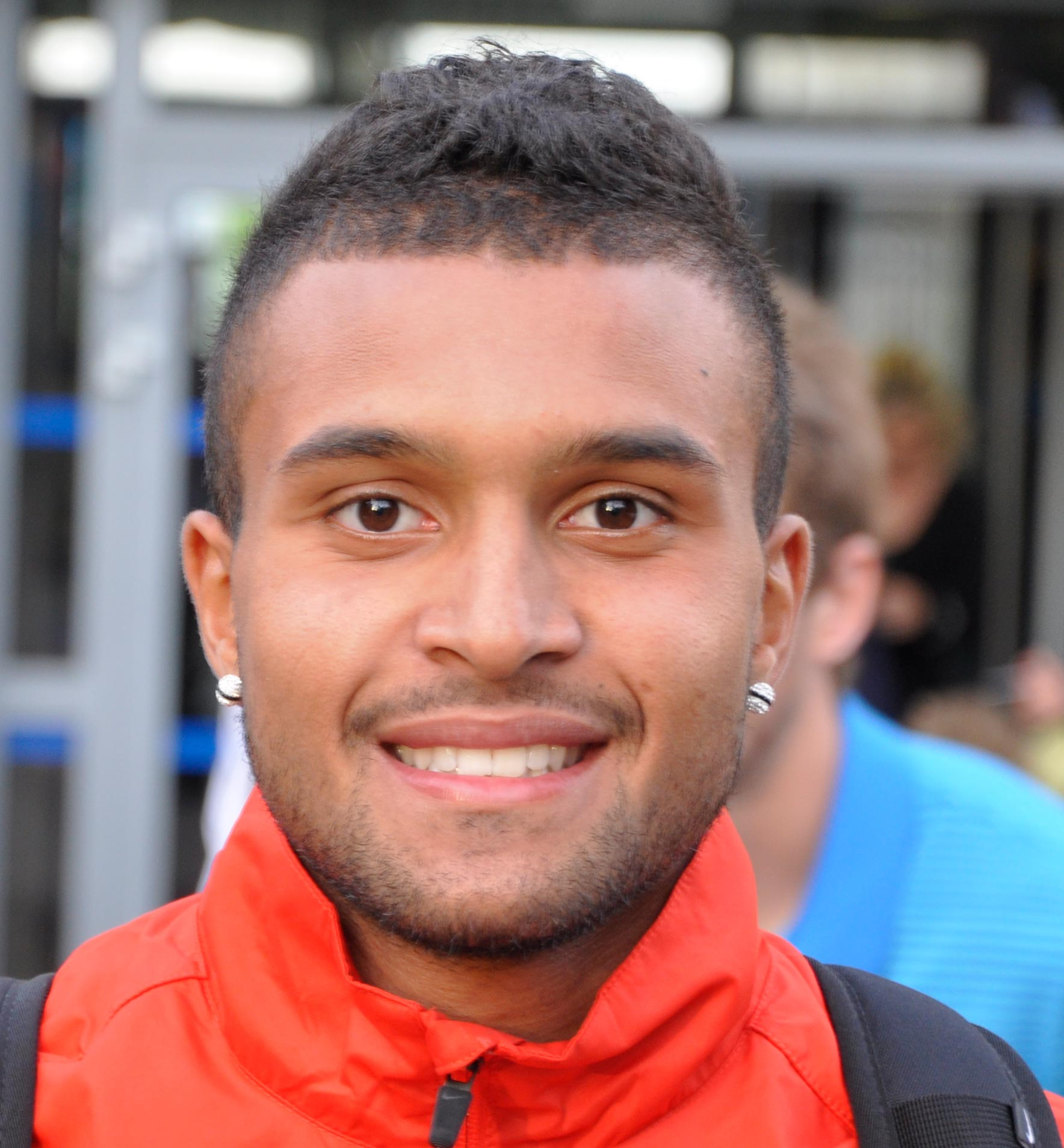

Personal information
- Full name: Frédéric Bulot Wagha
- Date of birth: 27 September 1990 (age 36)
- Place of birth: Libreville, Gabon
- Height: 1.79 m (5 ft 10 in)
- Position: Midfielder

Youth career
- 1996–2005: Tours
- 2002–2005: IFR Châteauroux
- 2005–2010: Monaco

Senior career*
Years	Team	Apps	(Gls)
2010–2011	Monaco	8	(0)
2011–2012	Caen	38	(4)
2012–2015	Standard Liège	64	(5)
2014–2015	→ Charlton Athletic (loan)	28	(5)
2015–2017	Reims	16	(1)
2018	Tours	11	(1)
2019	FC Gifu	13	(0)
2020	FELDA United	4	(1)
2021	Doxa Katokopias	5	(0)

International career
2005–2006	France U16	12	(0)
2006–2007	France U17	12	(2)
2007–2008	France U18	5	(0)
2008–2009	France U19	17	(0)
2010–2012	France U21	9	(3)
2014–2019	Gabon	25	(0)
- * Club domestic league appearances and goals

Frédéric Bulot Wagha (born 27 September 1990), better known as Frédéric Bulot, is a Gabonese former professional footballer who played as a midfielder. He was a French youth international, having earned caps with all levels, beginning with the under-16 team.

== Career ==
=== Monaco ===
At Monaco, Bulot signed his first professional contract on 18 July 2008 agreeing to a three-year deal until June 2011.

After playing with the club's Championnat de France amateur team for the first two years of the contract, he was promoted to the senior team for the 2010–11 season and was assigned the number 22 shirt by manager Guy Lacombe. On 7 August 2010, Bulot made his professional debut in the club's opening league match against Lyon. He started the match and played 57 minutes before being substituted out in a 0–0 draw.

=== Caen ===
In July 2011, he joined Caen on a three-year deal.

=== Standard Liège ===
On 30 August 2014, it was announced he had signed a one-year loan deal with Charlton Athletic.

=== Reims ===
On 13 July 2015, Bulot signed for Reims.

== International career ==
Bulot was eligible for both France and Gabon on senior international level due to being born to a French father and Gabonese mother. He received his first called up to the Gabon national team in February 2014. He made his international debut in a friendly match against Morocco on 5 March 2014.

== Style of play ==
Former club Monaco described him as a versatile left-footed box-to-box midfielder who is capable of playing as a centre midfielder or an attacker.
