= Yoni Buyens =

Belgian footballer

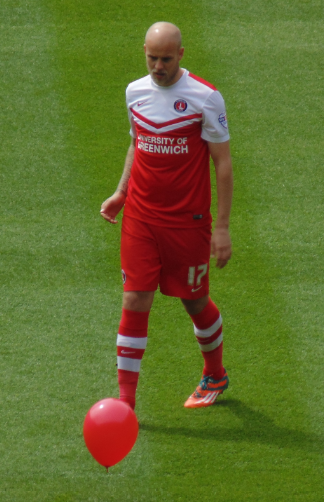

Personal information
- Date of birth: 10 March 1988 (age 38)
- Place of birth: Duffel, Belgium
- Height: 1.82 m (6 ft 0 in)
- Position: Defensive midfielder

Team information
- Current team: Westerlo

Senior career*
Years	Team	Apps	(Gls)
2004–2009	Lierse	81	(4)
2009–2011	KV Mechelen	64	(2)
2011–2015	Standard Liège	103	(12)
2014–2015	→ Charlton Athletic (loan)	40	(8)
2015–2018	Genk	30	(4)
2016–2017	→ Westerlo (loan)	21	(1)
2018	Lierse	0	(0)
2018–	Lierse Kempenzonen	0	(0)

International career
2006–2007	Belgium U19	8	(0)
2007–2008	Belgium U20	3	(0)
2009–2010	Belgium U21	2	(0)

Managerial career
- 2022–: Westerlo (academy)
- * Club domestic league appearances and goals as of 30 September 2017

Yoni Buyens (Dutch pronunciation: [ˈjoːni ˈbœyə(n)s]; born 10 March 1988) is a Belgian professional football coach and former football midfielder who is currently an academy coach for K.V.C. Westerlo.

== Career ==
On 21 June 2014, it was announced Buyens had signed a one-year loan deal with Charlton Athletic.

On 30 June 2015, Buyens signed with Genk on a three-year deal.

In 2022, K.V.C. Westerlo announced that they had signed Buyens as an academy coach.
