= 2020–21 Stoke City F.C. season =

Stoke City
2020–21 season
- Joint-Chairman: John Coates and Peter Coates
- Manager: Michael O'Neill
- Stadium: bet365 Stadium
- Championship: 14th
- FA Cup: Third round
- EFL Cup: Quarter-finals
- Top goalscorer: League: Nick Powell (12); All: Nick Powell (12)
Home colours	Away colours

The 2020–21 season was Stoke City's 104th season in the Football League, and the 44th in the second tier.

Due to the ongoing COVID-19 pandemic the 2020–21 season began later in September with matches continuing to played behind closed doors. Stoke began the season in good form, winning eight of their first 16 matches and were just outside the play-off places at the beginning of December. However a number of injuries to key players most notably to Tyrese Campbell saw goals dry up and the team went nine games without a win at the turn of the year. Stoke were unable to put a sustained run of results together in March and April and ended the season in mid-table.

== Pre-season ==
Stoke announced their retained list in July 2020, leaving the club were goalkeeper Adam Federici from the first team, and Jake Dunwoody, James Jennings, Ash Kigbu, Cameron McJannet, Tre Pemberton, Abdul Sankoh, Ollie Shenton and Scott Wara from the under-23 squad. Also leaving were the two players who agreed to temporary contract extensions to cover the final nine games of the 2019–20 season, Mame Biram Diouf and Stephen Ward. O'Neill made his first signing of the summer bringing in former Sheffield Wednesday left-back Morgan Fox. Centre-back James Chester re-joined the club having spent the second half of last season on loan from Aston Villa. Stoke brought in former Sheffield Wednesday striker Steven Fletcher on 14 August. Former Chelsea midfielder John Obi Mikel joined the club on 17 August 2020 having left Trabzonspor in March. On 9 September Stoke brought in winger Jacob Brown from Barnsley.

The squad returned to Clayton Wood on 7 August and the following week travelled to Belfast for a training camp and a behind closed doors friendly against NIFL Premiership champions Linfield at Windsor Park. Stoke won 1–0 with a first half strike from Josh Tymon. They then played two matches against League One sides, losing 1–0 to Burton Albion and beating Shrewsbury Town 5–1. Stoke ended their pre-season schedule with back-to-back wins over Premier League sides Leeds United and Newcastle United.

Date	Opponent	Venue	Result	Scorers	Report
15 August 2020	Linfield	A	1–0	Tymon 35'	Report
22 August 2020	Burton Albion	H	0–1		Report
25 August 2020	Shrewsbury Town	H	5–1	Oakley-Boothe, Mikel, Ince, Afobe, Campbell	Report
1 September 2020	Leeds United	H	3–0	Collins 24', Gregory 52', Ince 62'	Report
5 September 2020	Newcastle United	A	1–0	Clucas 18'	Report

== Championship ==
Because the 2019–20 season was extended into the summer of 2020 due to the COVID-19 pandemic, the 2020–21 season started at a later date of 12 September 2020 with matches continuing to be played behind-closed doors. The summer transfer window was open from 27 July to 16 October.

=== September ===
For the season opener away at Millwall, Michael O'Neill started new signings Morgan Fox and John Obi Mikel. The match was a cagey affair with few chances and it unsurprisingly ended in a goalless draw. Stoke produced a poor performance in the first home game of the campaign against Bristol City, with the Robins winning 2–0 with goals from Nahki Wells and Andreas Weimann. Stoke earned their first victory of the campaign away at Preston North End on 26 September. Preston started the match the better team but the match turned in Stoke's favor after Tom Barkhuizen was sent-off in the 22nd minute for a tackle on Morgan Fox. Stoke went on to win 1–0 with a close range finish from Lee Gregory.

=== October ===
Stoke faced Birmingham City in the first match in October and despite having the better possession and chances they were frustrated by a well disciplined Birmingham side and they took the lead through a Harlee Dean header. O'Neill brought on Powell from the bench and he scored in the 86th minute to help Stoke earn a 1–1 draw. Following the international break, Stoke travelled to Luton Town where former manager Nathan Jones had returned to. After an uneventful first half Stoke scored twice early in the second through Fletcher and Powell to see out a 2–0 victory. Four days later they took on Barnsley and poor defending cost them in the first half as Elliot Simões gave the Tykes the lead before Campbell equalised just before half time only for Dominik Frieser to score in stoppage time. A mistake from Jack Walton just after half time allowed Tommy Smith to score his first goal for the club. Nathan Collins was sent-off for an off the ball incident with Frieser and Stoke were able to see out a 2–2 draw. Collins' red card was later rescinded by the FA. Stoke put in a fine performance against promotion favorites Brentford and were 3–0 up after goals from Campbell, Fletcher and McClean before a late brace from Marcus Forss ensured a nervy finish but Stoke were able to gain a 3–2 win. City then produced an abject performance away at Swansea City where they lost 2–0 without having a shot on target. Stoke ended October with a 1–0 win against Rotherham United with a long kick from Angus Gunn being lobbed into the Millers net by McClean.

=== November ===
Stoke were then controversially beaten 3–2 by Watford at Vicarage Road. Fletcher had given Stoke an early lead before Tom Cleverley leveled for Watford despite clearly barging into Angus Gunn. A João Pedro penalty put Watford in front with Stoke responding through Powell. Ismaïla Sarr won the match late on for the Hornets despite a handball in the build up. Stoke beat early league leaders Reading 3–0 with goals from Campbell, Fletcher and Brown to earn a first league victory at the Madjeski Stadium. Stoke suffered an injury problem after both senior goalkeepers, Adam Davies and Angus Gunn were ruled out for up to two months with Josef Bursik being recalled from his loan at Doncaster Rovers. Bursik started two days later against Carlos Corberán's Huddersfield Town who took the lead through Carel Eiting. Two quick goals from Campbell put Stoke in front before Isaac Mbenza levelled for the Terriers. An own goal from Richard Stearman ensured Stoke went into half time with a 3–2 lead which was extended by Sam Clucas early in the second half. Naby Sarr pulled another goal back for Huddersfield but Stoke held out for a 4–3 victory. Stoke struggled against leaders Norwich City and were 3–0 down early in the second half after goals from Emiliano Buendía and a brace from Teemu Pukki. Buendía was then sent-off which sparked a comeback from Stoke with Campbell and Collins scoring but Norwich held on to win 3–2. November ended with a drab goalless draw at Tony Pulis' Sheffield Wednesday.

=== December ===
Stoke's goalkeeping injury crisis worsened prior to the match against Wycombe Wanderers after Niki Mäenpää who was signed on a temporary deal to provide cover for Bursik, also suffered an injury in training meaning that Andy Lonergan was brought in on a similar contract. 1,000 Wycombe fans were allowed to attend the match following the end of the second lockdown in England and they saw Nick Powell score the only goal of the game after 72 minutes. Stoke moved into a play-off position for the first time this season with a 1–0 win over Middlesbrough thanks to a first half header from Nathan Collins. They then missed the chance to move into an automatic place as Cardiff City came from behind to win 2–1. A depleted Stoke team played out a goalless draw at Derby County on 12 December. Stoke suffered another long-term injury after it was confirmed that Campbell would miss the rest of the season. Three days later they played out another goalless draw this time away at Queens Park Rangers. They then ground out a 1–0 win over Blackburn Rovers with Powell scoring an early diving header. On Boxing day against Coventry City, City played out a third consecutive goalless away draw. Stoke ended 2020 with a 1–1 draw against Nottingham Forest in foggy conditions.

=== January ===
Stoke began 2021 with a narrow defeat against promotion chasing AFC Bournemouth. For the trip to Blackburn Rovers, O'Neil gave first starts to new signings Rabbi Matondo and Rhys Norrington-Davies in what was Stoke's youngest starting eleven for 15 years with an average age of 25. Powell gave Stoke a first half lead before Blackburn equalised through John Buckley. James Chester was then sent-off after bringing down Adam Armstrong who was through on goal and Stoke held on for a 1–1 draw. The side then drew 3–3 at relegation threatened Rotherham United with O'Neill critical of his teams defending. Stoke ended January without a win after defeat against Watford and a draw away at Huddersfield Town where Rhys Norrington-Davies was sent-off just before half time.

In the January transfer window, O'Neill trimmed his squad by loaning out Moritz Bauer, Lee Gregory, Tom Ince, Liam Lindsay and Kevin Wimmer whilst Thibaud Verlinden left on a permanent basis. Coming in were Alfie Doughty from Charlton Athletic and three loans Jack Clarke, Rabbi Matondo and Rhys Norrington-Davies.

=== February ===
Stoke's barren run of form continued into February with a goalless draw against Reading and a heavy defeat at Norwich. Stoke ended their nine-game winless run with a 1–0 win against Sheffield Wednesday with Steven Fletcher scoring against his former club. On 19 February 2021, club captain Ryan Shawcross left Stoke by mutual consent after 14 years ahead of a move to Inter Miami CF in the United States. City coasted to a 3–0 win against Luton Town with Powell scoring twice to complete a league double over the Hatters. The team then put in an inept performance away at Barnsley, losing 2–0. Stoke ended February with a first visit to the Brentford Community Stadium where they lost 2–1 despite taking the lead in the first minute.

=== March ===
Stoke lost a third game in a row after a 2–1 defeat against Swansea. Powell gave City an early lead but goals from Connor Roberts and a controversial late penalty from André Ayew earned Swansea the win. Three days later they ended their losing run with a 2–0 home win over rock bottom Wycombe Wanderers, with Rhys Norrington-Davies and Harry Souttar scoring their first goals for the club. They were then easily beaten 3–0 by Middlesbrough. Stoke played out a goalless draw with Cardiff City with under-23s striker Christian Norton making his league debut. A goal from Jacob Brown gave Stoke a 1–0 win against Derby County in the final match of March to move the team past the 50 point mark.

=== April ===
Over the Easter weekend Stoke had mixed fortunes as they beat Bristol City 2–0 at Ashton Gate on Good Friday but then lost 2–1 to Millwall on Easter Monday. The following week the team lost again, this time 2–0 to relegation threatened Birmingham City. Following the Birmingham game assistant manager Billy McKinlay left the club and was replaced by the former Bristol City manager Dean Holden. Stoke played out a drab goalless draw with Preston North End on 17 April with Harry Souttar being sent-off late on after bringing down Alan Browne. Stoke lost 3–2 to Coventry City, with O'Neil highly critical of his team's performance. Stoke drew 1–1 at Nottingham Forest with Rabbi Matondo first goal for the club being cancelled out by Lewis Grabban.

=== May ===
Stoke lost their penultimate game of the season 2–0 to Queens Park Rangers. Stoke ended the 2020–21 season with a 2–0 win against AFC Bournemouth with academy graduate Will Forrester scoring on his debut.

=== Results ===
Match	Date	Opponent	Venue	Result	Attendance	Scorers	Report
1	12 September 2020	Millwall	A	0–0	—		Report
2	20 September 2020	Bristol City	H	0–2	—		Report
3	26 September 2020	Preston North End	A	1–0	—	Gregory 39'	Report
4	4 October 2020	Birmingham City	H	1–1	—	Powell 86'	Report
5	17 October 2020	Luton Town	A	2–0	—	Fletcher 46', Powell 55'	Report
6	21 October 2020	Barnsley	H	2–2	—	Campbell 44', Smith 48'	Report
7	24 October 2020	Brentford	H	3–2	—	Fletcher 9', McClean 35', Campbell 59'	Report
8	27 October 2020	Swansea City	A	0–2	—		Report
9	31 October 2020	Rotherham United	H	1–0	—	McClean 27'	Report
10	4 November 2020	Watford	A	2–3	—	Fletcher 2', Powell 81'	Report
11	7 November 2020	Reading	A	3–0	—	Campbell 23', Fletcher 35' Brown 90+5'	Report
12	21 November 2020	Huddersfield Town	H	4–3	—	Campbell (2) 31', 33', Stearman (o.g.) 45', Clucas 57'	Report
13	24 November 2020	Norwich City	H	2–3	—	Campbell 70', Collins 79'	Report
14	28 November 2020	Sheffield Wednesday	A	0–0	—		Report
15	2 December 2020	Wycombe Wanderers	A	1–0	1,000	Powell 72'	Report
16	5 December 2020	Middlesbrough	H	1–0	—	Collins 19'	Report
17	8 December 2020	Cardiff City	H	1–2	—	Morrison 25' (o.g.)	Report
18	12 December 2020	Derby County	A	0–0	—		Report
19	15 December 2020	Queens Park Rangers	A	0–0	2,000		Report
20	19 December 2020	Blackburn Rovers	H	1–0	—	Powell 6'	Report
21	26 December 2020	Coventry City	A	0–0	—		Report
22	29 December 2020	Nottingham Forest	H	1–1	—	Thompson 18'	Report
23	2 January 2021	Bournemouth	H	0–1	—		Report
24	16 January 2021	Blackburn Rovers	A	1–1	—	Powell 38'	Report
25	19 January 2021	Rotherham United	A	3–3	—	MacDonald 14' (o.g.), Batth 62', Powell 75'	Report
26	22 January 2021	Watford	H	1–2	—	Fletcher 83'	Report
27	30 January 2021	Huddersfield Town	A	1–1	—	Fletcher 24' (pen)	Report
28	6 February 2021	Reading	H	0–0	—		Report
29	13 February 2021	Norwich City	A	1–4	—	Powell 61'	Report
30	16 February 2021	Sheffield Wednesday	H	1–0	—	Fletcher 83'	Report
31	20 February 2021	Luton Town	H	3–0	—	Powell (2) 20', 63', Fletcher 78'	Report
32	24 February 2021	Barnsley	A	0–2	—		Report
33	27 February 2021	Brentford	A	1–2	—	Brown 1'	Report
34	3 March 2021	Swansea City	H	1–2	—	Powell 6'	Report
35	6 March 2021	Wycombe Wanderers	H	2–0	—	Norrington-Davies 64', Souttar 69'	Report
36	13 March 2021	Middlesbrough	A	0–3	—		Report
37	16 March 2021	Cardiff City	A	0–0	—		Report
38	20 March 2021	Derby County	H	1–0	—	Brown 74'	Report
39	2 April 2021	Bristol City	A	2–0	—	Powell 25', Fletcher 62'	Report
40	5 April 2021	Millwall	H	1–2	—	Brown 41'	Report
41	10 April 2021	Birmingham City	A	0–2	—		Report
42	17 April 2021	Preston North End	H	0–0	—		Report
43	21 April 2021	Coventry City	H	2–3	—	Brown 58', Clucas 70'	Report
44	24 April 2021	Nottingham Forest	A	1–1	—	Matondo 27'	Report
45	1 May 2021	Queens Park Rangers	H	0–2	—		Report
46	8 May 2021	Bournemouth	A	2–0	—	Forrester 36', Smith 52'	Report

==== League table ====
Pos	Team	Pld	W	D	L	GF	GA	GD	Pts
11	Millwall	46	15	17	14	47	52	−5	62
12	Luton Town	46	17	11	18	41	52	−11	62
13	Preston North End	46	18	7	21	49	56	−7	61
14	Stoke City	46	15	15	16	50	52	−2	60
15	Blackburn Rovers	46	15	12	19	65	54	+11	57
16	Coventry City	46	14	13	19	49	61	−12	55
17	Nottingham Forest	46	12	16	18	37	45	−8	52

Source: EFL Official Website
Rules for classification: 1) Points; 2) Goal difference; 3) Number of goals scored; 4) Head-to-head results; 5) Wins; 6) Away goals; 7) Penalty points (sec 9.5); 8) 12-point sending off offences

== FA Cup ==
Stoke were drawn against Leicester City in the FA Cup and were well beaten 4–0 making it five consecutive third round exits.

Round	Date	Opponent	Venue	Result	Scorers	Report
R3	9 January 2021	Leicester City	H	0–4		Report

== EFL Cup ==
In the first round of the EFL Cup Stoke beat EFL League One side Blackpool 5–4 on penalties after a goalless ninety minutes. On September 17, 2020, Stoke went on to beat Wolverhampton Wanderers in the second round, after a late winner from Jacob Brown. In the Third Round, Stoke edged past League One side Gillingham 1–0 with a goal from Tyrese Campbell in the 37th minute. City again won 1–0 in the fourth round away at Aston Villa with a first half header from Sam Vokes. Stoke faced a strong Tottenham Hotspur side in the quarter-final. Spurs won 3–1 with goals from Gareth Bale, Ben Davies and Harry Kane whilst Jordan Thompson scored his first goal for Stoke.

Round	Date	Opponent	Venue	Result	Scorers	Report
R1	29 August 2020	Blackpool	H	0–0 (5–4 pens)		Report
R2	17 September 2020	Wolverhampton Wanderers	A	1–0	Brown 86'	Report
R3	23 September 2020	Gillingham	H	1–0	Campbell 37'	Report
R4	1 October 2020	Aston Villa	A	1–0	Vokes 26'	Report
QF	23 December 2020	Tottenham Hotspur	H	1–3	Thompson 53'	Report

== Squad statistics ==
No.	Pos.	Name	Championship		FA Cup		League Cup		Total		Discipline	
No.	Pos.	Name	Apps	Goals	Apps	Goals	Apps	Goals	Apps	Goals	Yellow card	Red card
1	GK	(England) Angus Gunn	14(1)	0	0	0	0	0	15(1)	0	2	0
3	DF	(Wales) Morgan Fox	20	0	0	0	2	0	22	0	2	0
4	MF	(Wales) Joe Allen	15(3)	0	1	0	0	0	16(3)	0	2	0
5	DF	(Scotland) Liam Lindsay	0	0	0	0	0	0	0	0	0	0
6	DF	(England) Danny Batth	26(2)	1	1	0	2	0	30(2)	1	8	0
7	MF	(England) Tom Ince	2(5)	0	0	0	0	0	2(5)	0	0	0
9	FW	(Wales) Sam Vokes	5(25)	0	1	0	2(1)	1	8(26)	1	0	0
10	FW	(Democratic Republic of the Congo) Benik Afobe	0	0	0	0	1	0	1	0	0	0
11	MF	(Republic of Ireland) James McClean	17(7)	2	1	0	4	0	22(7)	2	9	0
12	DF	(Wales) James Chester	32	0	0	0	1	0	33	0	7	1
13	MF	(Nigeria) John Obi Mikel	35(4)	0	1	0	1	0	37(4)	0	6	0
14	DF	(England) Tommy Smith	34(1)	2	1	0	4(1)	0	39(2)	2	6	0
15	DF	(Netherlands) Bruno Martins Indi	2	0	0	0	3	0	5	0	0	0
16	GK	(Wales) Adam Davies	17	0	0	0	4	0	21	0	1	0
17	DF	(England) Ryan Shawcross (c)	0(2)	0	1	0	0	0	1(2)	0	0	0
18	MF	(England) Jacob Brown	27(14)	5	1	0	2(2)	1	30(16)	6	8	0
19	FW	(England) Lee Gregory	3(3)	1	0	0	3	0	6(3)	1	0	0
20	MF	(England) Tashan Oakley-Boothe	3(13)	0	0	0	3(2)	0	6(15)	0	0	0
21	FW	(Scotland) Steven Fletcher	30(7)	9	0	0	0(5)	0	30(12)	9	3	0
22	MF	(England) Sam Clucas	18(6)	2	1	0	1	0	20(6)	2	4	0
23	MF	(Belgium) Thibaud Verlinden	0(1)	0	0	0	0	0	0(1)	0	0	0
23	MF	(England) Alfie Doughty	0	0	0	0	0	0	0	0	0	0
24	MF	(England) Jordan Cousins	8(11)	0	0	0	1(1)	0	9(12)	0	2	0
25	MF	(England) Nick Powell	38(1)	12	0	0	2(1)	0	40(2)	12	5	0
26	FW	(England) Tyrese Campbell	13(3)	6	0	0	2(1)	1	15(4)	7	1	0
28	GK	(England) Andy Lonergan	0	0	0	0	1	0	1	0	0	0
32	GK	(England) Josef Bursik	15	0	1	0	0	0	16	0	0	0
34	MF	(Northern Ireland) Jordan Thompson	24(10)	1	1	0	5	1	30(10)	2	5	0
35	DF	(England) Josh Tymon	16(10)	0	0	0	3	0	19(10)	0	0	0
36	DF	(Australia) Harry Souttar	38	1	1	0	4	0	43	1	2	1
37	DF	(Republic of Ireland) Nathan Collins	19(3)	2	0(1)	0	4	0	23(4)	2	3	1
39	DF	(England) Will Forrester	1	1	0	0	0	0	1	1	0	0
40	GK	(Cameroon) Blondy Nna Noukeu	0	0	0	0	0	0	0	0	0	0
44	FW	(Wales) Christian Norton	2(4)	0	0	0	0	0	2(4)	0	0	0
46	DF	(Wales) Rhys Norrington-Davies	20	1	0	0	0	0	20	1	2	1
47	FW	(England) Jack Clarke	6(8)	0	0	0	0	0	6(8)	0	1	0
49	FW	(Wales) Rabbi Matondo	5(5)	1	0(1)	0	0	0	5(6)	1	0	0
50	DF	(England) Connor Taylor	0(1)	0	0	0	0	0	0(1)	0	0	0
—	GK	(Finland) Niki Mäenpää	0	0	0	0	0	0	0	0	0	0
Own goals			—	3	—	0	—	0	—	3	—	

== Transfers ==
=== In ===
Date	Pos.	Name	From	Fee	Ref.
7 August 2020	DF	(Wales) Morgan Fox	(England) Sheffield Wednesday	Free	
10 August 2020	DF	(Wales) James Chester	(England) Aston Villa	Free	
14 August 2020	FW	(Scotland) Steven Fletcher	(England) Sheffield Wednesday	Free	
17 August 2020	MF	(Nigeria) John Obi Mikel	Unattached	Free	
9 September 2020	MF	(England) Jacob Brown	(England) Barnsley	Undisclosed	
27 November 2020	GK	(Finland) Niki Mäenpää	Unattached	Free	
2 December 2020	GK	(England) Andy Lonergan	Unattached	Free	
22 January 2020	MF	(England) Alfie Doughty	(England) Charlton Athletic	Undisclosed	
2 February 2021	FW	(England) Will Goodwin	(England) Chester	Undisclosed	
2 February 2021	FW	(England) D'Margio Wright-Phillips	(England) Manchester City	Undisclosed	

=== Out ===
Date	Pos.	Name	To	Fee	Ref.
30 June 2020	MF	(France) Ibrahim Doucoure	—	Released	
30 June 2020	MF	(Northern Ireland) Jake Dunwoody	(Republic of Ireland) Derry City	Free	
30 June 2020	GK	(Australia) Adam Federici	(Australia) Macarthur	Free	
30 June 2020	FW	(Republic of Ireland) James Jennings	—	Released	
30 June 2020	MF	(England) Reece Jones	—	Released	
30 June 2020	DF	(England) Ash Kigbu	—	Released	
30 June 2020	DF	(England) Cameron McJannet	(Republic of Ireland) Derry City	Free	
30 June 2020	MF	(England) Tre Pemberton	—	Released	
30 June 2020	FW	(Netherlands) Abdul Sankoh	—	Released	
30 June 2020	MF	(England) Ollie Shenton	(England) Chorley	Free	
30 June 2020	DF	(Fiji) Scott Wara	—	Released	
17 July 2020	DF	(Republic of Ireland) Stephen Ward	(England) Ipswich Town	Released	
20 July 2020	FW	(Senegal) Mame Biram Diouf	(Turkey) Hatayspor	Released	
8 August 2020	FW	(Belgium) Julien Ngoy	(Belgium) KAS Eupen	Undisclosed	
16 October 2020	GK	(England) Jack Butland	(England) Crystal Palace	Undisclosed	
9 January 2021	GK	(England) Andy Lonergan	(England) West Bromwich Albion	Free transfer	
22 January 2021	MF	(Belgium) Thibaud Verlinden	(Netherlands) Fortuna Sittard	Undisclosed	
19 February 2021	DF	(England) Ryan Shawcross	(United States) Inter Miami	Mutual Consent	

=== Loans in ===
Date from	Pos.	Name	From	Date to	Ref.
16 October 2020	GK	(England) Angus Gunn	(England) Southampton	End of season	
7 January 2021	FW	(Wales) Rabbi Matondo	(Germany) Schalke 04	End of season	
12 January 2021	DF	(Wales) Rhys Norrington-Davies	(England) Sheffield United	End of season	
14 January 2021	FW	(England) Jack Clarke	(England) Tottenham Hostpur	End of season	

=== Loans out ===
Date from	Pos.	Name	To	Date to	Ref.
27 July 2020	MF	(England) Ryan Woods	(England) Millwall	30 June 2021	
20 August 2020	GK	(England) Josef Bursik	(England) Doncaster Rovers	30 June 2021	
4 September 2020	MF	(Denmark) Lasse Sørensen	(England) Milton Keynes Dons	30 June 2021	
9 September 2020	MF	(Nigeria) Peter Etebo	(Turkey) Galatasaray	30 June 2021	
17 September 2020	FW	(Democratic Republic of the Congo) Benik Afobe	(Turkey) Trabzonspor	30 June 2021	
28 September 2020	MF	(Senegal) Badou Ndiaye	(Turkey) Fatih Karagümrük	7 February 2021	
6 October 2020	DF	(Netherlands) Bruno Martins Indi	(Netherlands) AZ Alkmaar	30 June 2021	
15 October 2020	DF	(England) Tom Edwards	(England) Fleetwood Town	20 January 2021	
13 November 2020	DF	(Wales) Eddy Jones	(England) AFC Telford United	December 2020	
18 December 2020	DF	(England) Connor Taylor	(England) Chester	31 January 2021	
27 January 2021	DF	(England) Tom Edwards	(United States) New York Red Bulls	End of season	
1 February 2021	FW	(England) Lee Gregory	(England) Derby County	End of season	
1 February 2021	MF	(England) Tom Ince	(England) Luton Town	End of season	
1 February 2021	DF	(Scotland) Liam Lindsay	(England) Preston North End	End of season	
1 February 2021	DF	(Austria) Kevin Wimmer	(Germany) Karlsruher SC	End of season	
5 February 2021	DF	(Austria) Moritz Bauer	(Russia) FC Ufa	End of season	
7 February 2021	MF	(Senegal) Badou Ndiaye	(Saudi Arabia) Al-Ain	End of season	
8 April 2021	GK	(England) Josef Bursik	(England) Peterborough United	End of season	
