= Tashan Oakley-Boothe =

English footballer

Personal information
- Full name: Tashan Dinnachi Oakley-Boothe
- Date of birth: 14 February 2000 (age 26)
- Place of birth: Lambeth, England
- Height: 6 ft 0 in (1.82 m)
- Position: Midfielder

Team information
- Current team: Eastern
- Number: 8

Youth career
- 2016–2017: Tottenham Hotspur

Senior career*
Years	Team	Apps	(Gls)
2017–2020	Tottenham Hotspur	0	(0)
2020–2023	Stoke City	18	(0)
2022–2023	→ Lincoln City (loan)	16	(0)
2023–2024	Blackpool	3	(0)
2024–2025	Estrela da Amadora	2	(0)
2025–2026	Dunfermline Athletic	31	(0)
2026–	Eastern	2	(0)

International career
2015–2016	England U16	9	(0)
2016–2017	England U17	19	(0)
2017	England U18	2	(0)
Medal record
Men's football
Representing England
FIFA U-17 World Cup
Winner	2017
UEFA European Under-17 Championship
Runner-up	2017
- * Club domestic league appearances and goals as of 22 November 2026

Tashan Dinnachi Oakley-Boothe (born 14 February 2000) is an English professional footballer who plays as a midfielder for Hong Kong Premier League club Eastern.

== Club career ==
=== Tottenham Hotspur ===
Oakley-Boothe was born in Lambeth and attended Canonbury Primary School and Highbury Grove School. He joined the Tottenham Hotspur academy team on 1 July 2016, and was called up to senior team by Mauricio Pochettino for a pre-season tour. On 22 July 2017, Oakley-Boothe made his first senior appearance for Tottenham against Paris Saint-Germain in 2017 International Champions Cup pre-season match.

Oakley-Boothe made his first-team debut for Tottenham Hotspur in a 1–0 win against Barnsley in the EFL Cup on 19 September 2017, replacing Dele Alli in added time. He remained with Spurs' under-23 side in 2018–19 and 2019–20. During this time he played in the EFL Trophy, in which he scored his first senior goal, in a 1–1 draw with Colchester United.

He rejected a new contract offer from Spurs in January 2020.

=== Stoke City ===
Oakley-Boothe joined Stoke City on 31 January 2020 signing a three-and-a-half-year contract for an undisclosed fee. He made his debut for Stoke on 7 March 2020 in a 5–1 victory against Hull City, a match in which he provided the assist for Nick Powell for Stoke's fifth goal. Oakley-Boothe made his first start for the club the final day of the season on 22 July 2020, in a 4–1 win against Nottingham Forest. In the 2020–21 campaign, he suffered a season-ending back injury at the start of April. He was released by Stoke at the end of the 2022–23 season.

==== Lincoln City (loan) ====
On 27 June 2022, Oakley-Boothe joined EFL League One side Lincoln City on a season-long loan. He made his Lincoln debut on the opening day of the season, against Exeter City. He made 25 appearances for Lincoln in 2022–23, helping the side finish eleventh.

=== Blackpool ===
Oakley-Boothe joined Blackpool on 16 August 2023, following a successful trial.

=== Estrela da Amadora ===
On 31 January 2024, Oakley-Boothe moved to Portugal, signing a three-and-a-half-year contract with Primeira Liga club Estrela da Amadora.

=== Dunfermline Athletic ===
In February 2025, Oakley-Boothe signed for Scottish Championship side Dunfermline Athletic on a short term deal until the end of the season. He made his debut for the club from the bench in a goalless draw against Livingston. At the end of the season, he signed a one year contract extension keeping him at the club until the summer of 2026.

In April 2026, Oakley-Boothe scored the winning penalty during their Scottish Cup semi–final victory over Falkirk. He started in the 2026 Scottish Cup final at Hampden Park which saw Dunfermline lose against Celtic to finish runners–up.

=== Eastern ===
On 27 October 2026, Oakley-Boothe joined Hong Kong Premier League club Eastern.

== International career ==
Oakley-Boothe was born in England and is of Jamaican descent. In May 2017, he was part of the England under-17 squad which reached the final of the 2017 UEFA European Under-17 Championship, playing five games. On 16 May 2017, Oakley-Boothe suffered a head injury, in the under-17s' semi-final game against Turkey, which caused a lengthy stoppage and ruled him out of the final.

Oakley-Boothe was also part of the England team that competed at the 2017 FIFA U-17 World Cup in India. On 28 October 2017, he started in the final and helped the team beat Spain 5–2 and win the FIFA U-17 World Cup.

== Career statistics ==
As of match played 23 May 2026

Appearances and goals by club, season and competition
Club	Season	League			National cup (Note: Includes FA Cup)		League cup (Note: Includes EFL Cup)		Other		Total	
Club	Season	Division	Apps	Goals	Apps	Goals	Apps	Goals	Apps	Goals	Apps	Goals
Tottenham Hotspur	2017–18	Premier League	0	0	0	0	1	0	0	0	1	0
Tottenham Hotspur U21	2018–19	—	—		—		—		3 (Note: Appearances in EFL Trophy)	0	3	0
Tottenham Hotspur U21	2019–20	—	—		—		—		3	1	3	1
Tottenham Hotspur U21	Tottenham Total		—		—		1	0	6	1	7	1
Stoke City	2019–20	EFL Championship	2	0	0	0	0	0	—		2	0
Stoke City	2020–21	EFL Championship	16	0	0	0	5	0	—		21	0
Stoke City	2021–22	EFL Championship	0	0	0	0	0	0	—		0	0
Stoke City	2022–23	EFL Championship	0	0	0	0	0	0	—		0	0
Stoke City	Stoke Total		18	0	0	0	5	0	—		23	0
Lincoln City (loan)	2022–23	EFL League One	16	0	1	0	3	0	5	0	25	0
Blackpool	2023–24	EFL League One	3	0	1	0	1	0	5	0	10	0
Estrela da Amadora	2023–24	Primeira Liga	2	0	0	0	0	0	0	0	2	0
Dunfermline Athletic	2024–25	Scottish Championship	9	0	0	0	0	0	0	0	9	0
Dunfermline Athletic	2025–26	Scottish Championship	22	0	5	0	4	0	3 (Note: One appearance in Scottish Challenge Cup, two appearances in Scottish Championship promotion play-offs)	0	34	0
Dunfermline Athletic	Dunfermline Total		31	0	5	0	4	0	3	0	43	0
Eastern	2026–27	Hong Kong Premier League	0	0	0	0	0	0	0	0	0	0
Career total			70	0	7	0	14	0	19	1	110	1

== Honours ==
England U17

- FIFA U-17 World Cup: 2017
- UEFA European Under-17 Championship runner-up: 2017

Dunfermline Athletic

- Scottish Cup runner-up: 2025–26
