= Thibaud Verlinden =

Belgian footballer

Personal information
- Full name: Thibaud Christa Philippe Verlinden
- Date of birth: 9 July 1999 (age 27)
- Place of birth: Brussels, Belgium
- Height: 1.73 m (5 ft 8 in)
- Position: Winger

Team information
- Current team: OH Leuven
- Number: 7

Youth career
- 2009–2010: Club Brugge
- 2010–2015: Standard Liège
- 2015–2017: Stoke City

Senior career*
Years	Team	Apps	(Gls)
2017–2021	Stoke City	11	(0)
2018	→ FC St. Pauli (loan)	0	(0)
2018	→ FC St. Pauli II (loan)	2	(0)
2019–2020	→ Bolton Wanderers (loan)	15	(3)
2021	Fortuna Sittard	6	(0)
2021–2022	DAC Dunajská Streda	16	(1)
2022–2025	Beerschot	80	(12)
2025–	OH Leuven	40	(3)

International career
2014	Belgium U15	5	(0)
2014–2015	Belgium U16	12	(1)
2015–2016	Belgium U17	17	(1)
2016–2018	Belgium U19	14	(2)
- * Club domestic league appearances and goals as of 1 June 2026

Thibaud Christa Philippe Verlinden (born 9 July 1999) is a Belgian professional footballer who plays as a winger for Belgian Pro League club OH Leuven.

== Career ==
=== Stoke City ===
Verlinden was born in Brussels and began his career playing in the youth teams at Club Brugge and Standard Liège. In the summer of 2015, he joined English club Stoke City from Standard Liège for a fee of €40,000. He made his professional debut on 23 August 2017 in a 4–0 EFL Cup win over Rochdale. In January 2018, it Verlinden's joined 2. Bundesliga side FC St. Pauli on loan until the end of the 2017–18 season. Verlinden had already participated at two training camps of the club. He made just two appearances for St. Pauli's reserve side in the Regionalliga Nord during his loan spell.

Verlinden made his league debut for Stoke on 16 March 2019 in a 0–0 draw against Reading. On 2 September 2019 Verlinden joined League One side Bolton Wanderers on loan until January 2020. He made his debut on 14 September 2019, starting against Rotherham United and scored in the fourth minute to give Bolton the lead, however Rotherham went on to win 6–1. At the end of his loan period Stoke chose to recall Verlinden. On his return to Stoke, Verlinden made a number of Championship appearances from the bench until he sustained an anterior cruciate ligament injury in on 12 February 2020, ruling him out of the remainder of the 2019–20 season. After returning fitness in 2020–21, Verlinden was unable to force his way into Michael O'Neill's team and in December 2020, stated he wanted to leave in order to find regular first team football.

=== Fortuna Sittard ===
Verlinden joined Dutch Eredivisie club Fortuna Sittard in January 2021.

=== Dunajská Streda ===
Verlinden signed a contract with DAC Dunajská Streda on 3 September 2021. His tenure was to last one year.

=== OH Leuven ===
On 3 February 2025, Verlinden signed a three-and-a-half-year contract with OH Leuven.

== Personal life ==
Verlinden's father, Dany, played professional football for Club Brugge and Lierse.

== Career statistics ==
As of match played 19 April 2024

Appearances and goals by club, season and competition
Club	Season	League			National cup		League cup		Other		Total	
Club	Season	Division	Apps	Goals	Apps	Goals	Apps	Goals	Apps	Goals	Apps	Goals
Stoke City U23	2016–17	–	—		—		—		2 (Note: Appearances in EFL Trophy)	0	2	0
Stoke City U23	2018–19	–	—		—		—		2	0	2	0
Stoke City U23	Total		0	0	0	0	0	0	4	0	4	0
Stoke City	2017–18	Premier League	0	0	0	0	1	0	—		1	0
Stoke City	2018–19	EFL Championship	5	0	0	0	0	0	—		5	0
Stoke City	2019–20	EFL Championship	5	0	1	0	0	0	—		6	0
Stoke City	2020–21	EFL Championship	1	0	0	0	0	0	—		1	0
Stoke City	Total		11	0	1	0	1	0	0	0	13	0
FC St. Pauli (loan)	2017–18	2. Bundesliga	0	0	0	0	0	0	—		0	0
FC St. Pauli II (loan)	2017–18	Regionalliga Nord	2	0	—		—		—		2	0
Bolton Wanderers (loan)	2019–20	League One	15	3	0	0	0	0	2	0	17	3
Fortuna Sittard	2020–21	Eredivisie	5	0	0	0	—		—		5	0
Fortuna Sittard	2021–22	Eredivisie	1	0	0	0	—		—		1	0
Fortuna Sittard	Total		6	0	0	0	0	0	0	0	6	0
Dunajská Streda	2021–22	Slovak Super Liga	16	1	0	0	—		—		16	1
Beerschot	2022–23	Challenger Pro League	31	5	2	1	—		—		33	6
Beerschot	2023–24	Challenger Pro League	28	5	0	0	—		—		28	5
Beerschot	Total		59	10	2	1	0	0	0	0	61	11
Career total			109	14	4	1	1	0	6	0	119	15
