= Jordan Cousins =

Jamaica footballer (born 1994)

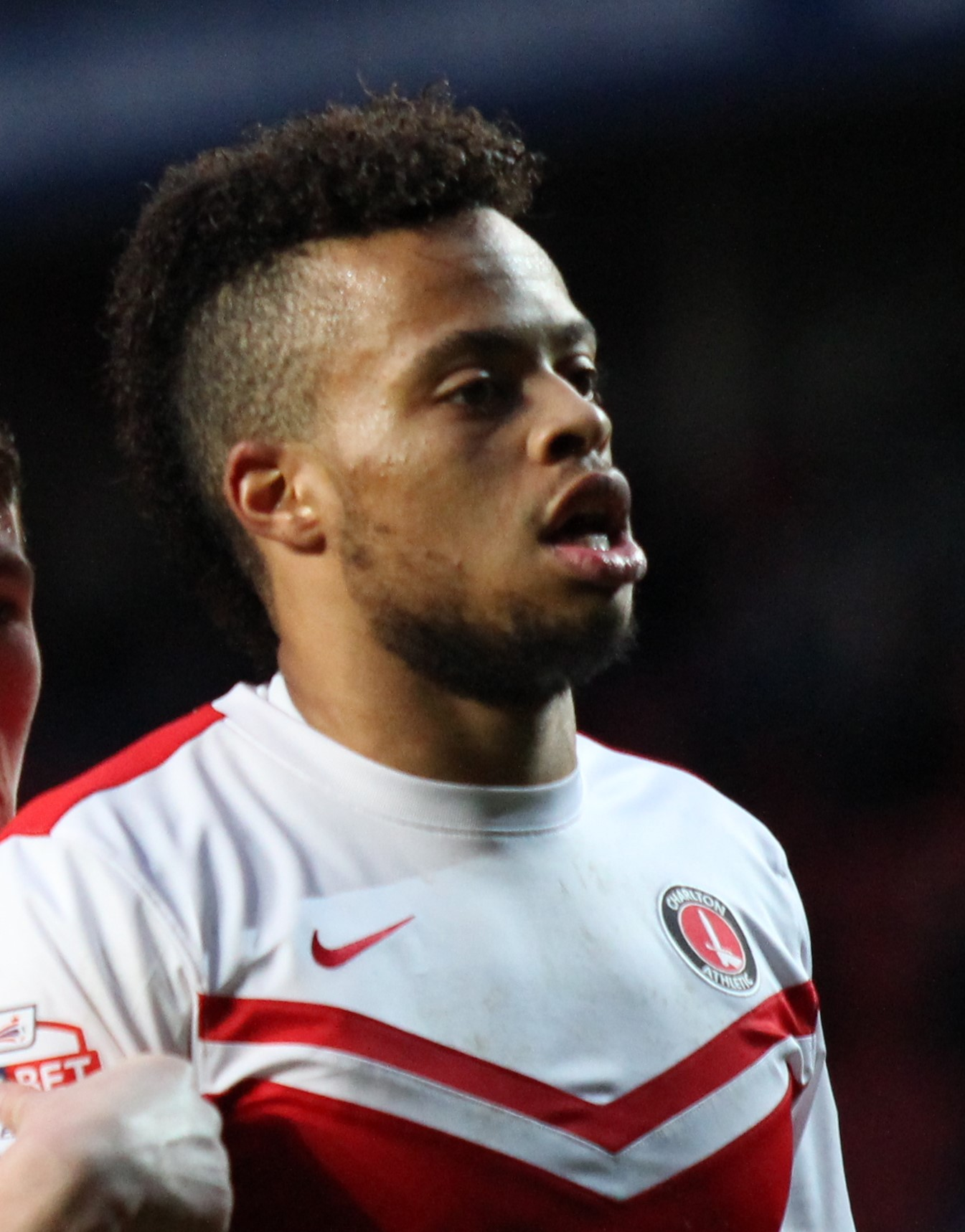
- Cousins with Charlton Athletic in 2015

Personal information
- Full name: Jordan Paul Cousins
- Date of birth: 6 March 1994 (age 32)
- Place of birth: Greenwich, England
- Height: 5 ft 10 in (1.78 m)
- Position: Midfielder

Team information
- Current team: Eastleigh
- Number: 24

Youth career
- 2006–2012: Charlton Athletic

Senior career*
Years	Team	Apps	(Gls)
2012–2016	Charlton Athletic	125	(7)
2016–2019	Queens Park Rangers	61	(1)
2019–2021	Stoke City	39	(0)
2021–2023	Wigan Athletic	26	(0)
2023–2025	Cambridge United	63	(2)
2025–	Eastleigh	38	(0)

International career
2008–2010	England U16	11	(1)
2009–2011	England U17	22	(0)
2011	England U18	1	(0)
2014	England U20	3	(1)
2022	Jamaica	1	(0)
- * Club domestic league appearances and goals as of 17:10, 18 September 2026 (UTC)

Jordan Paul Cousins (born 6 March 1994) is a professional footballer who plays as a midfielder for National League club Eastleigh. Born in England, he plays for the Jamaica national team.

Cousins began his career with Charlton Athletic, breaking into the first team in 2013–14 after progressing thorough their academy. He became a regular with the Addicks until the side suffered relegation in 2015–16 and he left for Queens Park Rangers. He spent three seasons at Loftus Road making 70 appearances before joining Stoke City in June 2019.

== Club career ==
=== Charlton Athletic ===
Cousins began his career with the Charlton Athletic Academy joining the under-13s and he signed professional terms in March 2011. He won the League One Apprentice of the Year award in 2012. He made his Charlton Athletic debut on 6 August 2013 in a 4–0 win against Oxford United in the League Cup. On 17 August 2013, he scored on his league debut in a 2–2 draw against Barnsley. Cousins described his first league goal as a "a dream come true". On 4 October 2013, Cousins signed a new three-year contract at the club, keeping him at The Valley until 2016. Cousins impressed manager Chris Powell enough to establish himself in the first team at The Valley and his bright start to life in Championship football saw him win the Football League Young Player of the Month award for October 2013. Cousins played 47 times in 2013–14 as Charlton finished in 18th position. He made the same number of appearances in 2014–15 as the Addicks finished in 12th. On 31 July 2015, Cousins signed a new four-year contract. Cousins played 42 times in 2015–16 as Charlton had a poor campaign and were relegated to League One. Following Charlton's relegation they received a bid for Cousins from Queens Park Rangers.

=== Queens Park Rangers ===
On 13 July 2016, Cousins joined Queens Park Rangers on a three-year deal. His first season with QPR, in 2016–17 was disrupted by injuries with Cousins undergoing surgery on a quad muscle injury in April 2016. His missed the start of the 2017–18 season after picking up another hamstring injury. He returned to the first team in October 2017 and went on to make 16 appearances as QPR finished in 16th position. He was sent-off for the first time in his career in a 2–0 EFL Cup defeat at Blackpool on 25 September 2018. Cousins scored his only goal for QPR in a 4–3 defeat against Birmingham City on 9 February 2019. His 2018–18 season was ended after he was stretchered off in a 2–1 home defeat to Blackburn Rovers on 19 April 2019. Cousins was released by QPR at the end of the season.

=== Stoke City ===
On 25 June 2019, Cousins joined Stoke City. He had previously worked with manager Nathan Jones at the Charlton Athletic Academy. He made his debut on the opening day of the 2019–20 season in a 2–1 defeat against his old club Queens Park Rangers. Cousins struggled for game time under Jones and spent two months out the squad before Michael O'Neill started him against Luton Town in December 2019. He kept his place in the side as Stoke's results began to improve and they edged away from the relegation zone. Cousins made 24 appearances in 2019–20 as Stoke finished in 15th position. Cousins was mainly used as back-up by O'Neill in the 2020–21 season, making 21 appearances before leaving the club after his contract expired in the summer.

=== Wigan Athletic ===
Cousins signed a two-year contract with Wigan Athletic on 15 June 2021.

=== Cambridge United ===
Following his release from Wigan, Cousins signed a one-year contract with Cambridge United. Following the conclusion of the 2023–24 season, the club activated the one-year extension option in Cousins' contract.

On 8 May 2025, following the conclusion of the 2024–25 season, which saw Cambridge United relegated to League Two, Cambridge United announced that Cousins would depart the club on 30 June 2025 following the expiry if his contract.

=== Eastleigh ===
On 15 July 2025, Cousins joined National League side Eastleigh.

== International career ==
Born in England, Cousins is of Jamaican descent. Cousins has been capped by England at Under 16, Under-17 and Under-18 level, he appeared for the Under-17's at both the 2011 UEFA European Under-17 Championship and the 2011 FIFA U-17 World Cup. In May 2014 he was called up to the Under-20 squad for the first time. In July 2021, he started the process of getting a Jamaican passport to represent the Jamaica national team. He was called up to represent the Jamaica national team in May 2022. He made his debut in a 6–0 friendly defeat to Catalonia on 25 May.

== Personal life ==
Cousins is the cousin of former Arsenal full back Kerrea Gilbert.

== Career statistics ==
As of match played 15 September 2026

Appearances and goals by club, season and competition
Club	Season	League			FA Cup		League Cup		Other		Total	
Club	Season	Division	Apps	Goals	Apps	Goals	Apps	Goals	Apps	Goals	Apps	Goals
Charlton Athletic	2013–14	Championship	42	2	4	0	1	0	—		47	2
Charlton Athletic	2014–15	Championship	44	3	1	0	2	0	—		47	3
Charlton Athletic	2015–16	Championship	39	2	1	0	2	0	—		42	2
Charlton Athletic	Total		125	7	6	0	5	0	—		136	7
Queens Park Rangers	2016–17	Championship	18	0	1	0	2	0	—		21	0
Queens Park Rangers	2017–18	Championship	15	0	1	0	0	0	—		16	0
Queens Park Rangers	2018–19	Championship	28	1	2	0	3	0	—		33	1
Queens Park Rangers	Total		61	1	4	0	5	0	—		70	1
Stoke City	2019–20	Championship	20	0	1	0	3	0	—		24	0
Stoke City	2020–21	Championship	19	0	0	0	2	0	—		21	0
Stoke City	Total		39	0	1	0	5	0	—		45	0
Wigan Athletic	2021–22	League One	16	0	1	0	2	0	0	0	19	0
Wigan Athletic	2022–23	Championship	10	0	1	0	0	0	—		11	0
Wigan Athletic	Total		26	0	2	0	2	0	0	0	30	0
Cambridge United	2023–24	League One	35	1	2	0	1	0	1	0	39	1
Cambridge United	2024–25	League One	28	1	2	0	0	0	2	0	32	1
Cambridge United	Total		63	2	4	0	1	0	3	0	71	2
Eastleigh	2025–26	National League	31	0	1	0	—		0	0	32	0
Eastleigh	2026–27	National League	7	0	0	0	—		0	0	7	0
Eastleigh	Total		38	0	1	0	0	0	0	0	39	0
Career total			352	10	18	0	18	0	3	0	391	10

== Honours ==
Wigan Athletic

- EFL League One: 2021–22
