= Josef Bursik (footballer) =

English footballer

Personal information
- Full name: Josef John Bursik
- Date of birth: 12 July 2000 (age 26)
- Place of birth: Lambeth, England
- Height: 6 ft 2 in (1.87 m)
- Position: Goalkeeper

Team information
- Current team: AFC Wimbledon (on loan from Portsmouth)

Youth career
- 2009–2017: AFC Wimbledon
- 2017–2018: Stoke City

Senior career*
Years	Team	Apps	(Gls)
2018–2023	Stoke City	50	(0)
2018	→ Hednesford Town (loan)	6	(0)
2019	→ AFC Telford United (loan)	17	(0)
2019–2020	→ Accrington Stanley (loan)	16	(0)
2020	→ Doncaster Rovers (loan)	10	(0)
2021	→ Peterborough United (loan)	6	(0)
2021	→ Lincoln City (loan)	0	(0)
2023–2025	Club Brugge	0	(0)
2023	Club NXT	6	(0)
2024–2025	→ Hibernian (loan)	13	(0)
2025–	Portsmouth	10	(0)
2026–	→ AFC Wimbledon (loan)	9	(0)

International career
2017	England U17	8	(0)
2017–2018	England U18	5	(0)
2018–2019	England U19	8	(0)
2019	England U20	4	(0)
2020–2022	England U21	10	(0)
- * Club domestic league appearances and goals as of 1 November 2026

Josef John Bursik (Czech: Buršík) is an English professional footballer who plays as a goalkeeper for EFL League One club AFC Wimbledon on loan from EFL Championship club Portsmouth.

== Club career ==
=== Stoke City ===
Bursik began his career at the youth academy at AFC Wimbledon, where he spent eight years before joining Stoke City on 1 July 2017. Bursik spent time on loan at Hednesford Town and AFC Telford United. On 2 August 2019, Bursik joined EFL League One side Accrington Stanley on loan for the 2019–20 season. Bursik made his Accrington Stanley debut on 29 October 2019 in the EFL Trophy. He made his League debut on 14 December 2019 in a 4–1 victory against Portsmouth. Bursik signed a new three-and-a-half-year contract with Stoke in January 2020. Bursik played 20 matches for Stanley in 2019–20 until the season was ended early due to the COVID-19 pandemic at the time Accrington were in 17th position.

In August 2020 Bursik joined Doncaster Rovers on loan for the 2020–21 season. After making 11 appearances for Doncaster, he was recalled by Stoke on 19 November 2020 following injuries to Adam Davies and Angus Gunn. Bursik made his Stoke debut on 21 November 2020 in a 4–3 win against Huddersfield Town. Bursik made 16 appearances for Stoke from November 2020 until January 2021 and kept seven clean sheets. Bursik joined Peterborough United on 8 April 2021 in an emergency loan deal following a season ending injury to Christy Pym. He made six appearances for Peterborough, helping them to gain promotion to the Championship. On 18 May 2021 Bursik joined Lincoln City on an emergency loan for their League One play-offs following a head injury to Alex Palmer. He played in the first leg a 2–0 win against Sunderland before Palmer was cleared to return. Bursik began the 2021–22 season as Stoke's first choice goalkeeper until he suffered a quad muscle injury with England U21s in November 2021. His place was taken by Jack Bonham until he returned to the team towards the end of the season.

=== Club Brugge ===
On 14 January 2023, Bursik signed for Belgian Pro League club Club Brugge for an undisclosed fee. After failing to break into the first team at Club Brugge, only appearing for their reserve team, Club NXT in the Challenger Pro League, Bursik joined Scottish Premiership side Hibernian on loan for the 2024–25 season.

=== Portsmouth ===
On 1 September 2025, Bursik signed for Championship club Portsmouth for an undisclosed fee.

He joined EFL League One club AFC Wimbledon on loan from Portsmouth on 1 September 2026.

== International career ==
Bursik was the starting goalkeeper for the England Under-17 team that lost to Spain on a penalty shoot-out in the final of the 2017 UEFA European Under-17 Championship. He was also a member of the squad that won the 2017 FIFA U-17 World Cup.

Having gone on to represent England at U18, U19 and U20 level, Bursik made his U21 debut during a 5–0 win over Albania at Molineux Stadium on 17 November 2020.

== Personal life ==
Bursik is named after his grandfather Josef Buršík, a Czech war hero. Bursik's father, Alex, died in September 2022.

== Career statistics ==
As of 25 April 2026

Appearances and goals by club, season and competition
Club	Season	League			National cup (Note: Includes FA Cup, Belgian Cup, Scottish Cup)		League cup (Note: Includes EFL Cup, Scottish League Cup)		Other		Total	
Club	Season	Division	Apps	Goals	Apps	Goals	Apps	Goals	Apps	Goals	Apps	Goals
Stoke City U23	2017–18	—	—		—		—		1 (Note: Appearances in EFL Trophy)	0	1	0
Stoke City	2017–18	Premier League	0	0	0	0	0	0	—		0	0
Stoke City	2018–19	Championship	0	0	0	0	0	0	—		0	0
Stoke City	2019–20	Championship	0	0	0	0	0	0	—		0	0
Stoke City	2020–21	Championship	15	0	1	0	0	0	—		16	0
Stoke City	2021–22	Championship	19	0	1	0	1	0	—		21	0
Stoke City	2022–23	Championship	16	0	0	0	0	0	—		16	0
Stoke City	Total		50	0	2	0	1	0	—		53	0
Hednesford Town (loan)	2018–19	Northern Premier League Premier Division	6	0	—		—		0	0	6	0
AFC Telford United (loan)	2018–19	National League North	17	0	—		—		—		17	0
Accrington Stanley (loan)	2019–20	League One	16	0	0	0	0	0	4	0	20	0
Doncaster Rovers (loan)	2020–21	League One	10	0	0	0	1	0	0	0	11	0
Peterborough United (loan)	2020–21	League One	6	0	0	0	0	0	0	0	6	0
Lincoln City (loan)	2020–21	League One	0	0	0	0	0	0	1 (Note: Appearances in League One Play-offs)	0	1	0
Club Brugge	2022–23	Belgian Pro League	0	0	0	0	—		0	0	0	0
Club Brugge	2023–24	Belgian Pro League	0	0	0	0	—		0	0	0	0
Club Brugge	2024–25	Belgian Pro League	0	0	0	0	—		0	0	0	0
Club Brugge	Total		0	0	0	0	—		0	0	0	0
Club NXT	2022–23	Challenger Pro League	1	0	—		—		—		1	0
Club NXT	2023–24	Challenger Pro League	5	0	—		—		—		5	0
Club NXT	Total		6	0	—		—		—		6	0
Hibernian (loan)	2024–25	Scottish Premiership	0	0	0	0	0	0	—		0	0
Portsmouth	2025–26	Championship	10	0	1	0	0	0	0	0	11	0
AFC Wimbledon (loan)	2026–27	League One	0	0	0	0	—		0	0	0	0
Career total			121	0	3	0	2	0	6	0	132	0

== Honours ==
England U17

- FIFA U-17 World Cup: 2017
- UEFA European Under-17 Championship runner-up: 2017
