= Jordan Thompson (footballer, born 1997) =

Northern Irish footballer (born 1997)

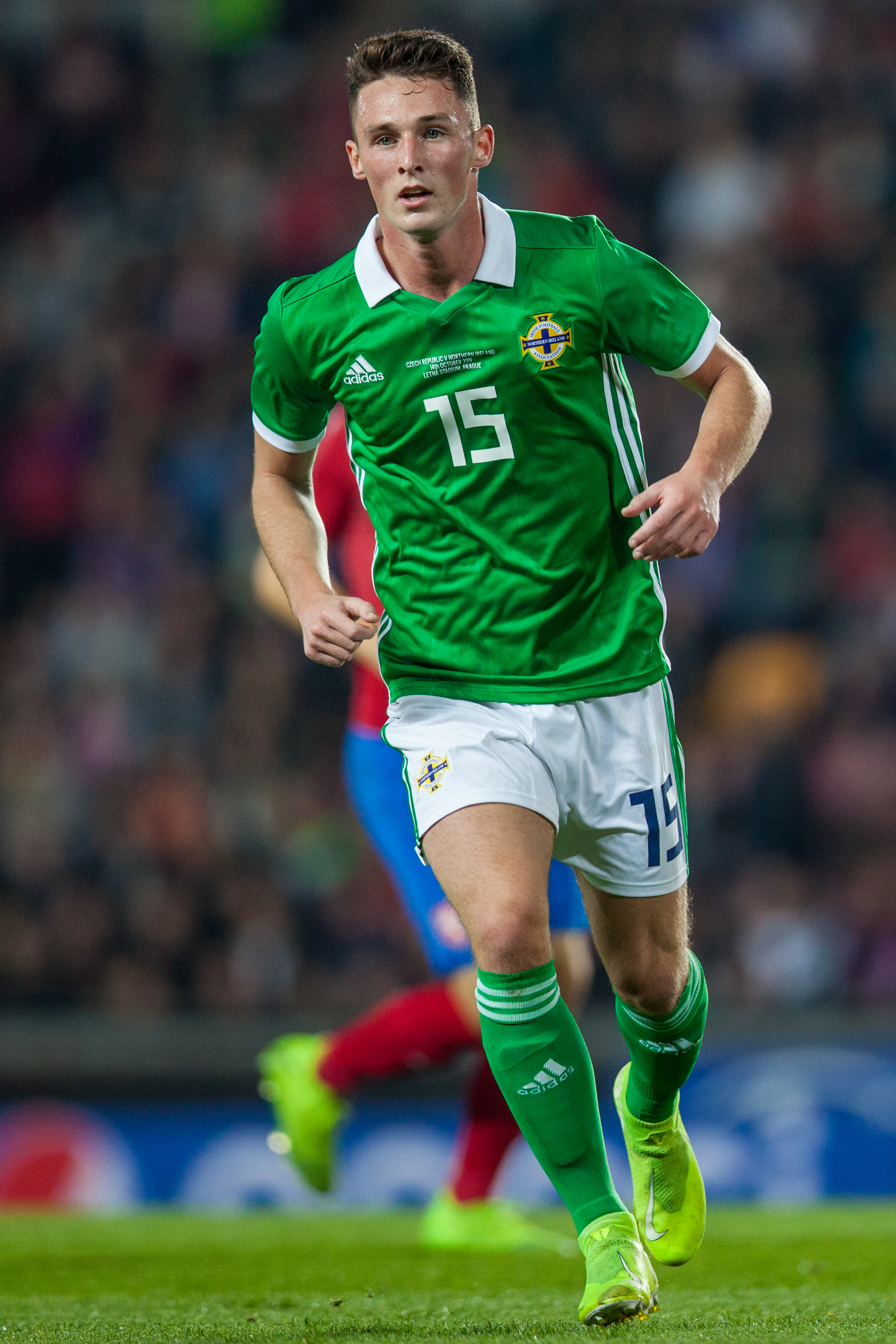
- Thompson with Northern Ireland in 2019

Personal information
- Full name: Jordan Andrew Thompson
- Date of birth: 3 January 1997 (age 29)
- Place of birth: Belfast, Northern Ireland
- Height: 5 ft 9 in (1.75 m)
- Position: Midfielder

Team information
- Current team: Preston North End
- Number: 15

Youth career
- 2011–2015: Manchester United

Senior career*
Years	Team	Apps	(Gls)
2015–2018	Rangers	2	(0)
2016	→ Airdrieonians (loan)	7	(1)
2016–2017	→ Raith Rovers (loan)	29	(1)
2018	→ Livingston (loan)	11	(0)
2018–2020	Blackpool	56	(4)
2020–2025	Stoke City	156	(3)
2025–	Preston North End	34	(2)

International career^{‡}
2013	Northern Ireland U17	3	(1)
2014–2016	Northern Ireland U19	8	(1)
2016–2018	Northern Ireland U21	12	(0)
2018–	Northern Ireland	39	(0)
- * Club domestic league appearances and goals as of 16:19, 9 November 2026 (UTC) ‡ National team caps and goals as of 10:01, 11 June 2024 (UTC)

Jordan Andrew Thompson (born 3 January 1997) is a Northern Irish professional footballer who plays as a midfielder for club Preston North End and the Northern Ireland national team.

Thompson began his career with Rangers after progressing through the youth teams at Manchester United. He spent time out on loan at Airdrieonians, Raith Rovers and Livingston before he joined EFL League One side Blackpool in June 2018. Thompson spent a year-and-a-half at Bloomfield Road and moved on to Stoke City in January 2020.

== Early life ==
Thompson grew up in Belfast, Northern Ireland, supporting Rangers.

== Club career ==
=== Rangers ===
Thompson started his career at Manchester United, spending four years at the club's academy but was unable to break into the first team and was released in the summer of 2015. He then joined Rangers on trial after a meeting with coach Ian Durrant. After impressing then-manager Mark Warburton, Thompson signed a two-year contract. He made his professional debut for Rangers in a 4–0 win against Alloa Athletic on 7 November 2015. On 23 February 2016, Thompson joined Scottish League One side Airdrieonians on a 28-day emergency loan and this loan was later extended to the end of the 2015–16 season. Thompson played seven times for Airdrieonians, scoring once in 3–1 win at Cowdenbeath.

After making his first appearance for Rangers in the 2016–17 season, against East Stirlingshire in the Scottish League Cup on 22 July, Thompson joined Scottish Championship side Raith Rovers on loan, on 5 August 2016 until January 2017. On 11 January 2017 he extended his contract with Rangers until 2018 and his loan at Raith Rovers until the end of the season. Thompson played 32 times for Raith in 2016–17 and was unable to help them avoid relegation after they lost the relegation play-off on penalties to Brechin City.

In January 2018, Thompson signed on loan for Scottish Championship side Livingston until the end of the 2017–18 season. Thompson made 15 appearances for Livi helping them gain promotion to the Scottish Premiership via the play-offs.

=== Blackpool ===
Thompson was released by Rangers in June 2018 and he then signed a two-year contract with EFL League One club Blackpool. Thompson played 45 times for Blackpool in 2018–19 as the team finished in 10th position. Thompson and Blackpool began the 2019–20 season in good form, with Thompson scoring a "wonderful" goal in a 2–1 win against Lincoln City. In January 2020 Blackpool manager Simon Grayson revealed that Thompson had attracted the attentions of Championship clubs.

=== Stoke City ===
Thompson joined EFL Championship club Stoke City on 17 January 2020 for an undisclosed fee. Thompson had previously worked with manager Michael O'Neill at International level with Northern Ireland. Thompson made 15 appearances for Stoke in 2019–20, helping the team avoid relegation and finish in 15th place. He scored his first goal for Stoke in a 3–1 defeat to Tottenham Hotspur in the EFL Cup on 23 December 2020. In the 2020–21 season Thompson, formed a midfield partnership alongside John Obi Mikel, making 40 appearances. Thompson struggled with injuries in 2021–22, undergoing knee surgery in December 2021 and damaging ankle ligaments in April 2022.

In April 2022, Thompson signed a new two-year contract with Stoke keeping him contracted until June 2024. Thompson made 38 appearances in 2022–23 as Stoke finished in 16th position. Thompson was sent-off for dissent on 1 January 2024 against Ipswich Town. Thompson made 35 appearances in 2023–24, scoring twice both against Birmingham City. At the end of the season Stoke triggered a one-year contract extension to Thompson's contract. Thompson struggled with injuries in 2024–25, making 26 appearances, as Stoke avoided relegation on the final day of the season, finishing in 18th. Thompson departed the club upon the expiration of his contract after making 178 appearances in all competitions.

=== Preston North End ===
Following his departure from Stoke, Thompson signed a two-year contract with Preston North End effective from 1 July 2025.

== International career ==
Thompson has represented Northern Ireland at various age levels. He made his international debut in May 2018. He started for the first time in a friendly against Luxembourg at Windsor Park on 5 September 2019.

== Career statistics ==
=== Club ===
As of 7 November 2026

Appearances and goals by club, season and competition
Club	Season	League			National cup (Note: Includes Scottish Cup, FA Cup)		League cup (Note: Includes Scottish League Cup, EFL Cup)		Other		Total	
Club	Season	Division	Apps	Goals	Apps	Goals	Apps	Goals	Apps	Goals	Apps	Goals
Rangers	2015–16	Scottish Championship	2	0	0	0	0	0	0	0	2	0
Rangers	2016–17	Scottish Premiership	0	0	0	0	1	0	0	0	1	0
Rangers	2017–18	Scottish Premiership	0	0	0	0	0	0	0	0	0	0
Rangers	Total		2	0	0	0	1	0	0	0	3	0
Airdrieonians (loan)	2015–16	Scottish League One	7	1	0	0	0	0	0	0	7	1
Rangers U20s	2016–17	—	—		—		—		2 (Note: Appearances in Scottish Challenge Cup)	0	2	0
Raith Rovers (loan)	2016–17	Scottish Championship	29	1	2	0	0	0	1 (Note: Appearance in Scottish Championship play-offs)	0	32	1
Livingston (loan)	2017–18	Scottish Championship	11	0	0	0	0	0	4	0	15	0
Blackpool	2018–19	EFL League One	38	3	3	0	4	0	0	0	45	3
Blackpool	2019–20	EFL League One	18	1	2	0	1	0	1 (Note: Appearances in EFL Trophy)	0	22	1
Blackpool	Total		56	4	5	0	5	0	1	0	67	4
Stoke City	2019–20	EFL Championship	15	0	0	0	0	0	—		15	0
Stoke City	2020–21	EFL Championship	34	1	1	0	5	1	—		40	2
Stoke City	2021–22	EFL Championship	18	0	2	0	4	0	—		24	0
Stoke City	2022–23	EFL Championship	34	0	3	0	1	0	—		38	0
Stoke City	2023–24	EFL Championship	32	2	0	0	3	0	—		35	2
Stoke City	2024–25	EFL Championship	23	0	0	0	3	0	—		26	0
Stoke City	Total		156	3	6	0	16	1	—		178	4
Preston North End	2025–26	EFL Championship	20	0	0	0	0	0	—		20	0
Preston North End	2026–27	EFL Championship	14	2	0	0	2	0	—		16	2
Preston North End	Total		34	2	0	0	2	0	—		36	2
Career total			295	11	13	0	24	1	8	0	340	12

=== International ===
National team	Year	Apps	Goals
Northern Ireland	2018	2	0
Northern Ireland	2019	5	0
Northern Ireland	2020	5	0
Northern Ireland	2021	8	0
Northern Ireland	2022	7	0
Northern Ireland	2023	8	0
Northern Ireland	2024	3	0
Northern Ireland	2025	1	0
Total		39	0

== Honours ==
Individual

- SuperCupNI (senior) Player of the Tournament: 2014
