= Sam Vokes =

Wales international footballer (born 1989)

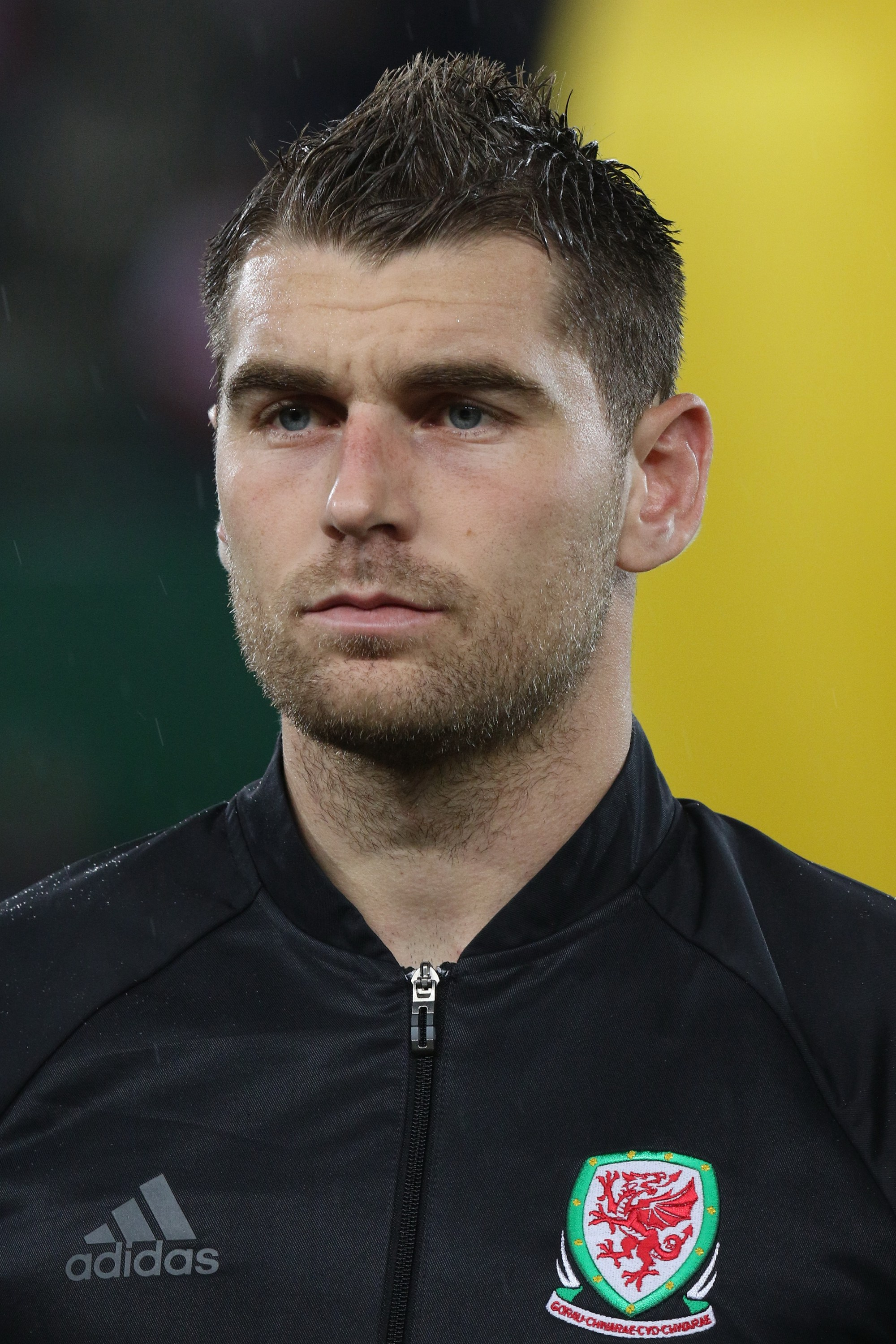
- Vokes with Wales, 2016

Personal information
- Full name: Samuel Michael Vokes
- Date of birth: 21 October 1989 (age 37)
- Place of birth: Southampton, England
- Height: 6 ft 1 in (1.86 m)
- Position: Striker

Youth career
- 2005–2006: AFC Bournemouth

Senior career*
| Years | Team | Apps | (Gls) |
| 2006–2008 | AFC Bournemouth | 54 | (16) |
| 2008–2012 | Wolverhampton Wanderers | 47 | (6) |
| 2009 | → Leeds United (loan) | 8 | (1) |
| 2010–2011 | → Bristol City (loan) | 1 | (0) |
| 2011 | → Sheffield United (loan) | 6 | (1) |
| 2011 | → Norwich City (loan) | 4 | (1) |
| 2011–2012 | → Burnley (loan) | 9 | (2) |
| 2012 | → Brighton & Hove Albion (loan) | 14 | (3) |
| 2012–2019 | Burnley | 230 | (56) |
| 2019–2021 | Stoke City | 78 | (8) |
| 2021–2025 | Wycombe Wanderers | 125 | (28) |
| 2025–2026 | Gillingham | 34 | (2) |
| Total | | 610 | (124) |

International career
| 2007–2010 | Wales U21 | 14 | (4) |
| 2008–2019 | Wales | 64 | (11) |
Medal record
Men's football
Representing Wales
UEFA European Championship
| Bronze medal – third place | 2016 France |
- * Club domestic league appearances and goals

Samuel Michael Vokes (born 21 October 1989) is a former professional footballer who played as a striker.

Vokes began his professional career at AFC Bournemouth in League One, making his debut in 2006. His form there earned a move to Championship side Wolverhampton Wanderers, where he helped them win promotion to the Premier League in his first season. In four seasons at Wolves, he played only 59 games, spending time on loan at six other clubs. In 2012, he transferred to Burnley, where he made 258 appearances and scored 62 goals, twice earning promotion to the Premier League. He signed for Stoke City in January 2019.

He has become an established member of the Wales national team, who he has also represented at under-21 level. Born and raised in England, Vokes is eligible to represent Wales through descendancy from his Welsh born grandfather. He has earned over 60 caps since his debut in 2008, and was part of their team that reached the semi-finals of UEFA Euro 2016.

== Early life ==
Vokes was born in Southampton and raised in Lymington, and attended Priestlands School in Pennington. Vokes began playing in the Southampton Academy but was released when he was ten-years-old. Vokes took a BTEC at Brockenhurst College and was taken on by Bournemouth's Academy.

== Club career ==
=== AFC Bournemouth ===
Vokes stepped up into AFC Bournemouth's first team on 5 December 2006 in a 2–0 victory over Nottingham Forest. His first senior goal came in a 1–1 draw at Gillingham on 16 December. The club gave him a three-and-a-half-year professional contract during the following month. He made 14 appearances and scored four goals in his debut season as the Cherries finished in 18th spot.

Vokes remained at Bournemouth during the 2007–08 season, despite being linked to several other clubs, including Newcastle United, Aston Villa, Everton and Celtic. He also turned down Crewe Alexandra in January 2008 who had made a £200,000 bid. Vokes was a bright spark in an otherwise tumultuous season for the Cherries as they were embroiled in a club ownership saga. His 12-goal tally could not prevent Bournemouth from being relegated to League Two.

=== Wolverhampton Wanderers ===
He eventually signed a four-year contract with Championship side Wolverhampton Wanderers on 23 May 2008. Vokes marked his debut for the club by coming off the bench to equalise in a 2–2 draw away to Plymouth Argyle on the opening day of the 2008–09 season. With the goal-scoring form of Chris Iwelumo and Sylvan Ebanks-Blake firing the club to the top of the table – that they led for almost the entire season – Vokes was mostly only employed as a substitute. Nonetheless he contributed to eight goals to help the team win promotion to the Premier League as champions.

To gain playing time, Vokes moved to League One side Leeds United in October 2009 on loan until the New Year, making his Leeds debut in a 2–1 victory over Norwich City on 19 October. He scored once for the club against Bristol Rovers but competition between Leeds strikers meant Vokes returned to Wolves when the deal ended.

Vokes went out on loan once more in August 2010 when he moved to Championship side Bristol City. He endured a miserable stay, tearing his hamstring within minutes of making his debut in a match against Millwall and re-aggravating the injury in a reserve match in December. He returned to Wolves when his loan expired in January having played just 13 minutes of first team football.

Once again fit, he moved on a month-long loan to another Championship side, Sheffield United, in February 2011 and made his début the same evening in a 1–1 draw with Reading. With their other attacking options regaining fitness, the Blades elected not to extend Vokes' loan period, meaning he was instead signed up by promotion-chasing Norwich City on 23 March on an emergency loan for the rest of the season. However, an injury to Wolves' leading goalscorer Kevin Doyle saw the club recall him after just four appearances for the Canaries, during which he scored once. Back at Molineux, he made two substitute appearances for the team during the run-in as they narrowly avoided relegation on the final day despite losing 3–2 against Blackburn Rovers.

During the 2011–12 season, he made four Premier League appearances for Wolves, but did not start a league match. In November 2011 he once more went out on loan to a Championship side, this time joining Burnley until 15 January. He played nine times for Burnley, scoring twice and impressed manager Eddie Howe.

On 30 January 2012, Vokes joined Championship side Brighton & Hove Albion on loan until the end of the season. He scored on his full home debut in a 2–2 draw with Millwall on 14 February 2012. He scored three goals in total during his 14 appearances for the Seagulls.

=== Burnley ===
On 31 July 2012, Vokes joined Championship side Burnley permanently signing a three-year contract for an undisclosed fee, believed to be £350,000. On 2 December, Vokes scored an equalising goal for Burnley in the 89th minute against fierce rivals Blackburn Rovers a match which ended 1–1. Despite this goal, Vokes struggled to establish himself in the first eleven and was used predominantly as a substitute. This was mainly down to the form of top scorer Charlie Austin, with manager Sean Dyche often opting to partner Austin with fellow strikers Martin Paterson or Danny Ings, both being quicker and more mobile than Vokes.

On the eve of the 2013–14 Championship season, Burnley agreed a deal with Queens Park Rangers for the transfer of Charlie Austin, who had attracted much attention from Premier League teams throughout the summer. With Austin moving out of the club, this gave Vokes his long-awaited chance in the starting eleven, and he formed a striking partnership with Danny Ings and he finished the season with 21 goals in 44 matches helping the Clarets finished 2nd, gaining promotion to the Premier League. He missed the run in after he ruptured his anterior cruciate ligament which kept him out until December 2014. He marked his return from injury with a goal against Tottenham Hotspur in the FA Cup. Vokes played 15 league matches in 2014–15 as Burnley suffered relegation back to the Championship.

On 8 August 2015, on the opening day of the 2015–16 Championship season, Vokes scored his first league goal since returning from a knee injury for Burnley against former club Leeds United in a 1–1 draw. Vokes signed a new three-and-a-half-year contract with Burnley in January 2016. He scored 16 goals in 46 appearances as Burnley returned to the Premier League as Championship title winners.

Vokes scored his first Premier League goal on 20 August 2016 at Turf Moor in a 2–0 win against Liverpool. Vokes scored 12 goals in 36 games in 2016–17 helping the team avoid relegation, finishing in 16th. Vokes scored twice in a 3–2 win away at champions Chelsea on the opening day of the 2017–18 season. He made 32 appearances as Burnley had a successful campaign finishing in 7th, qualifying for the UEFA Europa League. In the 2018–19 season, Vokes scored the club's first European goal in over half a century from close range for an equaliser away to Aberdeen. Burnley went out to Greek side Olympiacos in the play-off round. In October 2018 Vokes signed new contract at Turf Moor keeping him contract until 2021. However, in January 2019 manager Sean Dyche said he would allow Vokes to leave in the club in the January transfer window.

=== Stoke City ===
Vokes joined Stoke City on 31 January 2019 on a three-and-a-half-year contract for an undisclosed fee. He made his debut two days later against Hull City, and missed a penalty in a 2–0 defeat. Vokes scored his first goal for Stoke on 23 February in a 1–1 draw with Aston Villa. Vokes ended the 2018–19 season with three goals from 12 appearances. Stoke made a poor start to the 2019–20 season failing to win any of the first ten matches under Nathan Jones. Vokes scored in all three rounds of the EFL Cup in August and September but didn't score in the league until December. He scored a dramatic 97th-minute winner against Sheffield Wednesday on boxing day which lifted the team off the bottom of the table. The season extended into June due to the COVID-19 pandemic and Vokes played in all the remaining matches and scored against relegation rivals Barnsley on 4 July 2020. He ended the campaign with eight goals from 40 appearances as Stoke avoided relegation and finished in 15th position.

In the 2020–21 season, Vokes was used mainly as a substitute by Michael O'Neill, starting only five of his 30 league appearances as Stoke finished in mid-table. His only goal during the campaign came in a 1–0 EFL Cup win away at Aston Villa on 1 October 2020.

=== Wycombe Wanderers ===
Vokes joined Wycombe Wanderers on 28 July 2021 for an undisclosed fee. On 16 May 2022, ahead of the play-off final, Vokes signed a new one-year contract with the club. On 24 April 2023, he said he had signed another new contract.

On 20 May 2025, the club announced he would be leaving in June when his contract expired.

=== Gillingham ===
Following his departure from Wycombe, Vokes signed a one-year contract with EFL League Two club Gillingham, managed by his former Wycombe manager Gareth Ainsworth. In April 2026, Vokes announced he would retire from professional football at the end of the 2025–26 season.

== International career ==
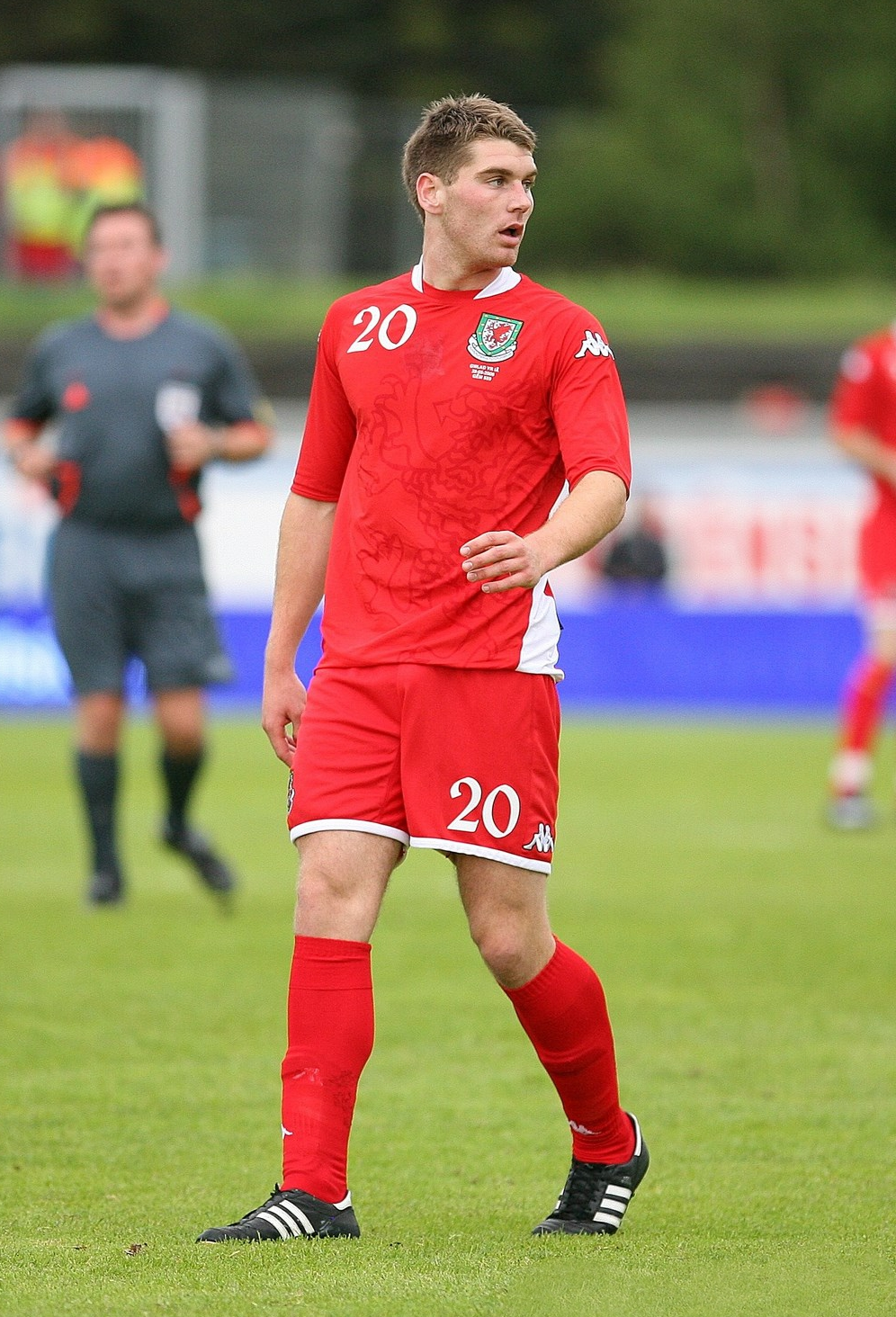
Vokes making his Welsh debut against Iceland in 2008

Born and brought up in England, Vokes is eligible to represent Wales through a grandfather born in Colwyn Bay. He did not know he was eligible for Wales until manager Brian Flynn called him up to the Welsh under-21 team, and he made his debut against Northern Ireland on 6 February 2007. The seventeen-year-old made an instant impression by scoring after 36 seconds, a team record, in a 4–0 victory. He remained in the team and featured in their European U-21 Championship qualifying campaign.

He was soon called up to the senior squad and made his debut in a 1–0 friendly win over Iceland on 28 May 2008, coming on as a substitute for Freddy Eastwood early into the second half. Vokes scored his first senior international goal when he netted the winner in a 1–0 win over Azerbaijan in their opening 2010 World Cup qualifier on 6 September 2008, striking seven minutes before the end at the Millennium Stadium.

In May 2016, Vokes was listed for the 29-man squad for a pre-Euro 2016 training camp, and was retained for the tournament final squad. On 1 July, he came on as a substitute and scored for Wales in a 3–1 win over Belgium at the finals, sealing the victory to take Wales to their first ever semi-final appearance at a major tournament.

At the 2018 China Cup, where Wales finished as runners-up, Vokes scored twice in a 6–0 win over the hosts in the semi-finals on 22 March.

== Career statistics ==
=== Club ===
Appearances and goals by club, season and competition
| Club | Season | League | | | FA Cup | | League Cup | | Other | | Total | |
| Club | Season | Division | Apps | Goals | Apps | Goals | Apps | Goals | Apps | Goals | Apps | Goals |
|---|---|---|---|---|---|---|---|---|---|---|---|---|
| AFC Bournemouth | 2006–07 | League One | 13 | 4 | 1 | 0 | 0 | 0 | 0 | 0 | 14 | 4 |
| AFC Bournemouth | 2007–08 | League One | 41 | 12 | 1 | 0 | 1 | 0 | 2 (Note: Appearances in Football League Trophy) | 0 | 45 | 12 |
| AFC Bournemouth | Total | | 54 | 16 | 2 | 0 | 1 | 0 | 2 | 0 | 59 | 16 |
| Wolverhampton Wanderers | 2008–09 | Championship | 36 | 6 | 2 | 2 | 1 | 0 | — | | 39 | 8 |
| Wolverhampton Wanderers | 2009–10 | Premier League | 5 | 0 | 3 | 0 | 1 | 0 | — | | 9 | 0 |
| Wolverhampton Wanderers | 2010–11 | Premier League | 2 | 0 | 2 | 0 | 0 | 0 | — | | 4 | 0 |
| Wolverhampton Wanderers | 2011–12 | Premier League | 4 | 0 | 0 | 0 | 3 | 1 | — | | 7 | 1 |
| Wolverhampton Wanderers | Total | | 47 | 6 | 7 | 2 | 5 | 1 | — | | 59 | 9 |
| Leeds United (loan) | 2009–10 | League One | 8 | 1 | 0 | 0 | 0 | 0 | 2 | 0 | 10 | 1 |
| Bristol City (loan) | 2010–11 | Championship | 1 | 0 | 0 | 0 | 0 | 0 | — | | 1 | 0 |
| Sheffield United (loan) | 2010–11 | Championship | 6 | 1 | 0 | 0 | 0 | 0 | — | | 6 | 1 |
| Norwich City (loan) | 2010–11 | Championship | 4 | 1 | 0 | 0 | 0 | 0 | — | | 4 | 1 |
| Burnley (loan) | 2011–12 | Championship | 9 | 2 | 0 | 0 | 0 | 0 | — | | 9 | 2 |
| Brighton & Hove Albion (loan) | 2011–12 | Championship | 14 | 3 | 1 | 0 | 0 | 0 | — | | 15 | 3 |
| Burnley | 2012–13 | Championship | 46 | 4 | 1 | 0 | 2 | 0 | — | | 49 | 4 |
| Burnley | 2013–14 | Championship | 39 | 20 | 1 | 1 | 4 | 0 | — | | 44 | 21 |
| Burnley | 2014–15 | Premier League | 15 | 0 | 2 | 1 | 0 | 0 | — | | 17 | 1 |
| Burnley | 2015–16 | Championship | 43 | 15 | 2 | 1 | 1 | 0 | — | | 46 | 16 |
| Burnley | 2016–17 | Premier League | 37 | 10 | 4 | 2 | 1 | 0 | — | | 42 | 12 |
| Burnley | 2017–18 | Premier League | 30 | 4 | 1 | 0 | 1 | 0 | — | | 32 | 4 |
| Burnley | 2018–19 | Premier League | 20 | 3 | 1 | 0 | 1 | 0 | 6 (Note: Appearances in UEFA Europa League) | 1 | 28 | 4 |
| Burnley | Total | | 230 | 56 | 12 | 5 | 10 | 0 | 6 | 1 | 258 | 62 |
| Stoke City | 2018–19 | Championship | 12 | 3 | 0 | 0 | 0 | 0 | — | | 12 | 3 |
| Stoke City | 2019–20 | Championship | 36 | 5 | 1 | 0 | 3 | 3 | — | | 40 | 8 |
| Stoke City | 2020–21 | Championship | 30 | 0 | 1 | 0 | 3 | 1 | — | | 34 | 1 |
| Stoke City | Total | | 78 | 8 | 2 | 0 | 6 | 4 | — | | 86 | 12 |
| Wycombe Wanderers | 2021–22 | League One | 43 | 16 | 2 | 0 | 2 | 0 | 3 (Note: Appearances in League One play-offs) | 1 | 50 | 17 |
| Wycombe Wanderers | 2022–23 | League One | 35 | 6 | 1 | 0 | 0 | 0 | 1 (Note: Appearance(s) in EFL Trophy) | 0 | 37 | 6 |
| Wycombe Wanderers | 2023–24 | League One | 40 | 4 | 0 | 0 | 2 | 0 | 6 | 1 | 48 | 5 |
| Wycombe Wanderers | 2024–25 | League One | 7 | 2 | 0 | 0 | 1 | 0 | 1 | 0 | 9 | 2 |
| Wycombe Wanderers | Total | | 125 | 28 | 3 | 0 | 5 | 0 | 11 | 2 | 144 | 30 |
| Gillingham | 2025–26 | League Two | 34 | 2 | 1 | 0 | 0 | 0 | 1 | 1 | 36 | 3 |
| Career total | | | 610 | 124 | 28 | 7 | 27 | 5 | 22 | 3 | 687 | 140 |

=== International ===
Appearances and goals by national team and year
| National team | Year | Apps | Goals |
|---|---|---|---|
| Wales | 2008 | 6 | 1 |
| Wales | 2009 | 8 | 1 |
| Wales | 2010 | 2 | 0 |
| Wales | 2011 | 3 | 2 |
| Wales | 2012 | 5 | 0 |
| Wales | 2013 | 6 | 1 |
| Wales | 2014 | 1 | 1 |
| Wales | 2015 | 6 | 0 |
| Wales | 2016 | 11 | 2 |
| Wales | 2017 | 8 | 0 |
| Wales | 2018 | 5 | 3 |
| Wales | 2019 | 3 | 0 |
| Total | | 64 | 11 |

Wales score listed first, score column indicates score after each Vokes goal.

International goals by date, venue, cap, opponent, score, result and competition
| No. | Date | Venue | Cap | Opponent | Score | Result | Competition | Ref |
|---|---|---|---|---|---|---|---|---|
| 1 | 6 September 2008 | Millennium Stadium, Cardiff, Wales | 3 | Azerbaijan | 1–0 | 1–0 | 2010 FIFA World Cup qualification | |
| 2 | 12 August 2009 | Podgorica City Stadium, Podgorica, Montenegro | 11 | Montenegro | 1–2 | 1–2 | Friendly | |
| 3 | 12 November 2011 | Cardiff City Stadium, Cardiff, Wales | 19 | Norway | 3–1 | 4–1 | Friendly | |
| 4 | 12 November 2011 | Cardiff City Stadium, Cardiff, Wales | 19 | Norway | 4–1 | 4–1 | Friendly | |
| 5 | 6 February 2013 | Liberty Stadium, Swansea, Wales | 25 | Austria | 2–0 | 2–1 | Friendly | |
| 6 | 5 March 2014 | Cardiff City Stadium, Cardiff, Wales | 31 | Iceland | 2–1 | 3–1 | Friendly | |
| 7 | 1 July 2016 | Stade Pierre-Mauroy, Villeneuve-d'Ascq, France | 43 | Belgium | 3–1 | 3–1 | UEFA Euro 2016 | |
| 8 | 5 September 2016 | Cardiff City Stadium, Cardiff, Wales | 45 | Moldova | 1–0 | 4–0 | 2018 FIFA World Cup qualification | |
| 9 | 22 March 2018 | Guangxi Sports Center, Nanning, China | 57 | China | 3–0 | 6–0 | 2018 China Cup | |
| 10 | 22 March 2018 | Guangxi Sports Center, Nanning, China | 57 | China | 4–0 | 6–0 | 2018 China Cup | |
| 11 | 11 October 2018 | Millennium Stadium, Cardiff, Wales | 60 | Spain | 1–4 | 1–4 | Friendly | |

== Honours ==
Wolverhampton Wanderers

- Football League Championship: 2008–09

Burnley

- Football League Championship: 2015–16; runner-up: 2013–14

Wycombe Wanderers

- EFL Trophy runner-up: 2023–24
