= Ash Kigbu =

English association football player (1999-)

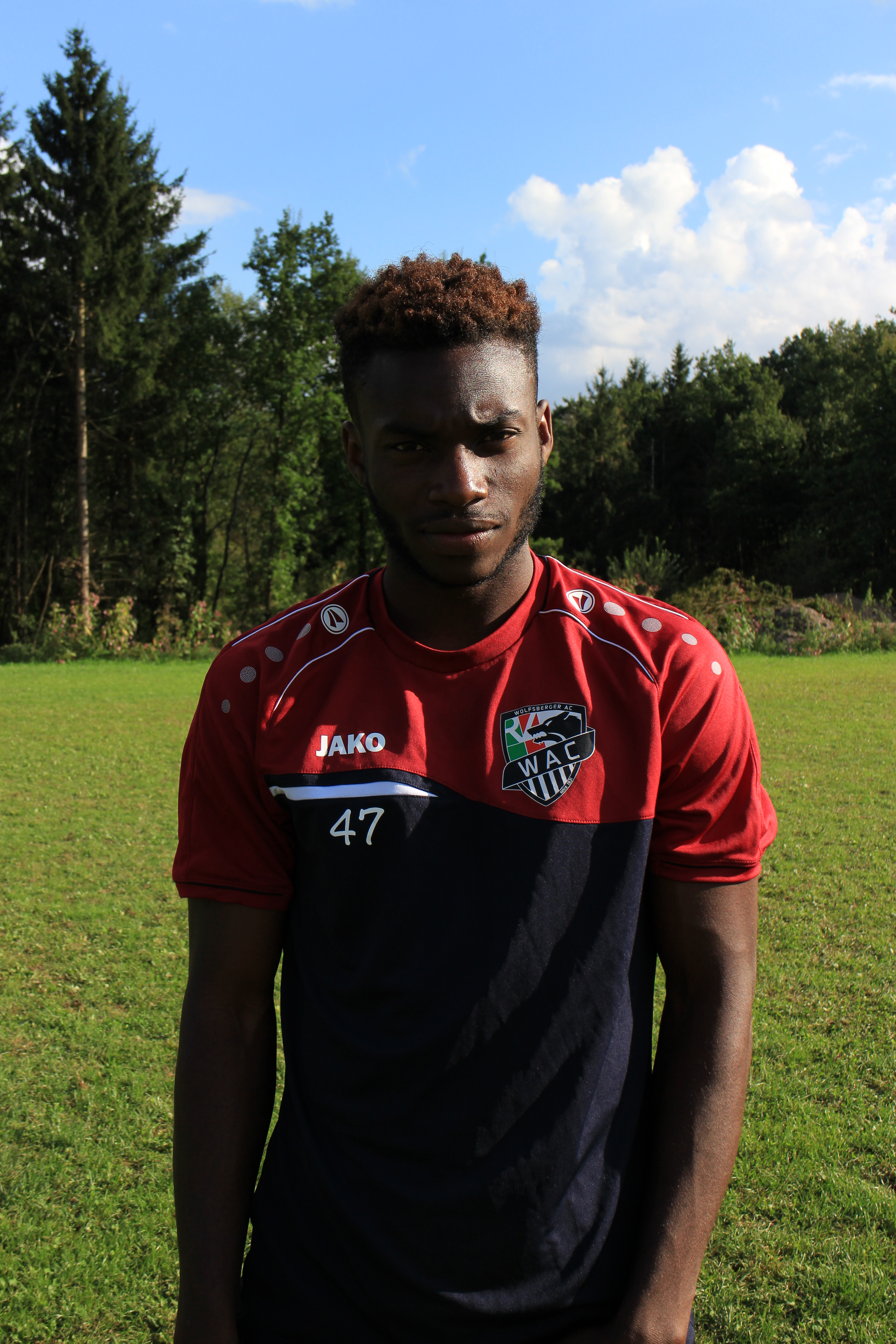

Personal information
- Full name: Ahogrenashinme Kigbu
- Date of birth: 5 February 1999 (age 27)
- Place of birth: Manchester, England
- Height: 1.86 m (6 ft 1 in)
- Position: Defender

Youth career
- 2015–2018: Manchester City

Senior career*
Years	Team	Apps	(Gls)
2018–2019	Wolfsberger II	3	(0)
2018–2019	Wolfsberger AC	4	(0)
2019–2020	Stoke City	0	(0)

International career^{‡}
2016	England U18	2	(0)
- * Club domestic league appearances and goals as of 19:57, 9 August 2019 (UTC) ‡ National team caps and goals as of 14:31, 17 December 2018 (UTC)

Ahogrenashinme Kigbu (born 5 February 1999) is an English former professional footballer who played as a defender.

== Career ==
Growing up, Kigbu trained with both Manchester United and Manchester City but eventually chose to sign for the later after attending St Bede's College. On 31 July 2018, Kigbu joined Austrian Bundesliga side Wolfsberger AC on a two-year deal with the option of a third. Two weeks later, he made his professional debut, playing the last ten minutes in a 0–0 draw with Rapid Wien.

On 8 August 2019, Kigbu signed for Championship side Stoke City joining their under-23 squad. Kigbu was released by Stoke in July 2020.

== International career ==
Born in England, Kigbu is of Nigerian descent. Kigbu was called up to the England under-18 team for the first time in August 2016 for a four-team mini tournament. He went on to make his debut in a 2–1 win over Italy U18.

== Career statistics ==
As of 9 August 2019

Appearances and goals by club, season and competition
Club	Season	League			Cup		League Cup		Other		Total	
Club	Season	Division	Apps	Goals	Apps	Goals	Apps	Goals	Apps	Goals	Apps	Goals
Wolfsberger II	2018–19	Austrian Regionalliga	3	0	—		—		—		3	0
Wolfsberger AC	2018–19	Austrian Bundesliga	4	0	1	0	—		—		5	0
Stoke City	2019–20	EFL Championship	0	0	0	0	0	0	—		0	0
Career total			7	0	1	0	0	0	0	0	8	0
