= Nick Powell =

English footballer (born 1994)

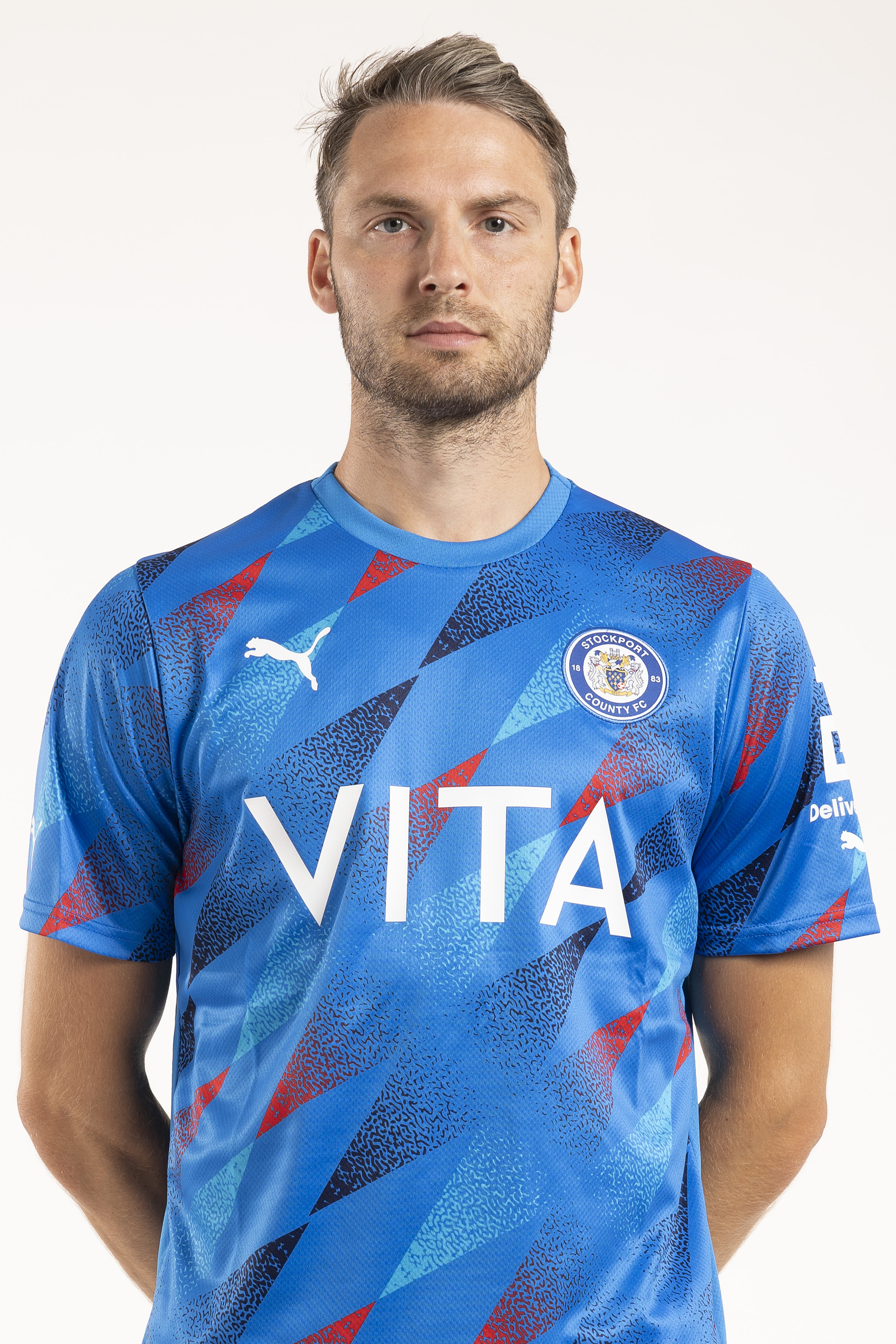
- Powell with Stockport in 2023

Personal information
- Full name: Nicholas Edward Powell
- Date of birth: 23 March 1994 (age 32)
- Place of birth: Crewe, England
- Height: 6 ft 0 in (1.83 m)
- Positions: Attacking midfielder; left winger

Team information
- Current team: Bradford City
- Number: 25

Youth career
- 1999–2010: Crewe Alexandra

Senior career*
Years	Team	Apps	(Gls)
2010–2012	Crewe Alexandra	55	(14)
2012–2016	Manchester United	3	(1)
2013–2014	→ Wigan Athletic (loan)	31	(7)
2014–2015	→ Leicester City (loan)	3	(0)
2016	→ Hull City (loan)	3	(0)
2016–2019	Wigan Athletic	92	(29)
2019–2023	Stoke City	111	(27)
2023–2025	Stockport County	39	(3)
2025–	Bradford City	24	(3)

International career
2009–2010	England U16	7	(1)
2010–2011	England U17	17	(5)
2012	England U18	1	(0)
2012–2013	England U19	2	(1)
2012–2013	England U21	2	(0)
- * Club domestic league appearances and goals as of 22 November 2026 (UTC)

Nicholas Edward Powell (born 23 March 1994) is an English professional footballer who plays as an attacking midfielder or left winger for EFL League One club Bradford City.

He began his career at Crewe Alexandra, initially as a forward, making his debut at the age of 16. After impressing for Crewe Alexandra during the 2011–12 season, including scoring in their 2–0 victory in the League Two play-off final, he moved to Manchester United in July 2012. Unable to break into the Manchester United first team, however, he went on loan to Wigan Athletic, Leicester City and Hull City before being released in June 2016. He re-joined Wigan Athletic in July 2016. He spent three seasons at the DW Stadium before joining Stoke City in June 2019. He has represented England at under-16, under-17, under-18, under-19 and under-21 levels.

== Club career ==
=== Crewe Alexandra ===
Born in Crewe, Cheshire, Powell attended Sandbach School and started his career at home-town club Crewe Alexandra, joining their youth system as a five-year-old. He made his debut for Crewe on 19 August 2010, in a League Two game against Cheltenham Town, which ended in a 3–2 defeat at Whaddon Road. At the age of 16 he came on as a second-half substitute for Clayton Donaldson, becoming the second youngest player ever to appear for Crewe.

On 20 August 2011, after only being on the pitch for eight minutes, Powell was sent off for the first time in the 2–0 defeat to Shrewsbury Town, following a poor challenge on Terry Gornell. Powell scored his first senior goal in a 3–1 away win at AFC Wimbledon on 15 October 2011. In January 2012, Powell was awarded the Football League's Young Player of the Month Award for December. He scored his first brace against Gillingham in a 4–3 win on 10 March 2012. On 21 April 2012, he won every award at Crewe's end of season awards ceremony, becoming the first player to win all five, including Goal of the Season (for his 30-yard strike in the 4–3 win at Gillingham), Young Player of the Year and Player of the Year.

On 27 May 2012, Powell scored the most important goal of his career so far, a volley from outside the box into the top corner in the 2–0 victory over Cheltenham Town in the 2012 League Two play-off final at Wembley Stadium, to win promotion to League One.

=== Manchester United ===
Powell joined Manchester United from Crewe Alexandra on 2 July 2012 in a deal reported to be worth up to £6 million, depending on future success and appearances. He was allocated the number 25 shirt that had been worn by Antonio Valencia, who took the number 7 shirt. It is also the same shirt number that he had worn at Crewe.

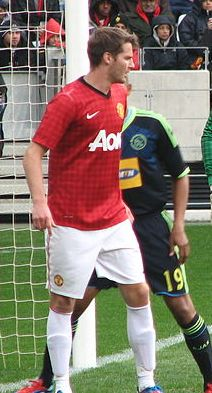
Powell playing for Manchester United in 2012

Powell played his first match for United on 21 July 2012 coming on as a second-half substitute in a pre-season friendly against Ajax Cape Town in South Africa. Four days later, he made his first start for Manchester United in a pre-season friendly match against Shanghai Shenhua. He made his Premier League debut against Wigan Athletic in a 4–0 win on 15 September 2012, coming on as a substitute for Ryan Giggs in the 71st minute, and scoring his first goal for United in the 82nd minute after receiving a pass from Javier Hernández.

On 2 September 2013, Powell joined Wigan Athletic on a season-long loan, following in the footsteps of fellow Manchester United player Tom Cleverley who had been on loan at the club. Powell then went on to score Wigan's first ever European goal, against NK Maribor on 3 October 2013, and later added the third goal in a 3–1 victory for his side. Powell then increased his European tally to three with a right-footed equaliser in Wigan's home tie against Rubin Kazan. On 15 December 2013, Powell scored an overhead kick in a 3–2 win over Bolton Wanderers. On 14 January 2014, Powell scored twice against Milton Keynes Dons in the FA Cup, overcoming the 1–0 deficit to help Wigan win 3–1.

Powell was given the number 22 for the 2014–15 season. He started the first game of the season in a League Cup match against Milton Keynes Dons which United lost 4–0. He was later substituted for James Wilson.

On 2 September, he was loaned to newly promoted Premier League team Leicester City for the rest of the season, with Tom Lawrence also making the move but on a permanent basis. On 1 November, Powell made his Leicester debut against West Bromwich Albion in the Premier League, coming on as a second-half substitute for Danny Drinkwater on 81 minutes in a 0–1 home defeat. On 27 December, it was reported that Leicester City had opted to terminate Powell's loan early due to the player showing a lack of commitment to training.

On 23 November 2015, Powell made his first appearance in 2015, playing 55 minutes in an under-21 game against Norwich City, having been sidelined by serious hamstring problems for around nine months.

Powell was included in United's Champions League squad for their crucial group game against VfL Wolfsburg on 9 December 2015, due to a number of injuries. He came on as a replacement for Juan Mata in this game which United went on to lose 3–2. PSV knocked Manchester United out of the Champions League, defeating CSKA Moscow in the other Group B match. He also came on as a second-half substitute in United's next game, a league defeat at Bournemouth, his first league appearance for United in over three years.

On transfer deadline day, 1 February 2016, Powell moved to Hull City on loan until the end of the 2015–16 season. He made his debut on 20 February 2016 in the FA Cup fifth round match at the Emirates Stadium against Arsenal that ended in a 0–0 draw.

In June 2016, Powell was released by Manchester United, and in July 2016 was variously reported to be set to sign for Wolverhampton Wanderers.

=== Wigan Athletic ===
On 12 July 2016, Powell returned to Wigan Athletic on a free transfer, signing a three-year contract. On 13 August 2016, Powell scored in his first appearance of the season, in a 3–0 home win against Blackburn Rovers. His first season was seemingly ended prematurely by injury during a January 2017 FA Cup game against Nottingham Forest, but Powell returned to first-team action three months later, coming on as a substitute and scoring an injury-time winner against Rotherham United. On 13 April 2017, Powell scored an 11-minute hat-trick for Wigan, who were 2–0 down in the second half against Barnsley, earning his side a 3–2 home win. Powell continued his scoring momentum four days later, netting from the bench in Wigan's 2–1 away defeat to Brighton & Hove Albion on 17 April 2017. Despite scoring five goals in three consecutive substitute appearances, Powell's exploits weren't enough to help Wigan avoid relegation to EFL League One.

Powell opened his account for the 2017–18 campaign on 5 August 2017, scoring from close range in Wigan's 1–0 opening day victory at Milton Keynes Dons. Powell claimed a second-half brace the following week, scoring a header and converting a penalty as Wigan cruised to a 4–1 home win against Bury. Powell scored 15 goals during the season helping the Latics win the League One title. In April 2018 he was nominated for the EFL League One Player of the Season award but he missed out to Blackburn Rovers' Bradley Dack.

Powell began the 2018–19 season well scoring in the first three matches against Aston Villa, Nottingham Forest and Sheffield Wednesday. Powell scored eight goals in 32 matches as Wigan secured Championship survival, finishing in 18th position. Wigan manager Paul Cook revealed in June 2019 that Powell had turned down the offer of a new contract and instead agreed one with Stoke City.

=== Stoke City ===
On 25 June 2019, Powell joined Championship side Stoke City. Powell made his debut on the opening day of the 2019–20 season against Queens Park Rangers but was unable to finish the match due to injury. He didn't return to the side until the end of the September against Nottingham Forest by which time Stoke had failed to register a victory and were bottom of the table. Michael O'Neill was appointed Stoke manager in November and Powell became a key member of his team as Stoke's results began to improve and the team move away from the foot of the table. He scored his first goal for the club on 1 January 2020 in a 5–2 victory against Huddersfield Town. Powell scored twice in a 5–1 win against relegation rivals Hull City on 7 March 2020 just before the season was suspended due to the COVID-19 pandemic. The season returned in June and Powell scored a 93rd-minute equaliser in the first match of the restart away at Reading. He came in for criticism in the next match against Middlesbrough after picking up two yellow cards within a minute. Powell ended the campaign with five goals from 30 appearances as Stoke avoided relegation and finished in 15th position.

The continuing COVID-19 pandemic meant all of Stoke City's 2020–21 matches were played behind closed doors, but Powell enjoyed a productive year, making 42 league and cup appearances, top-scoring with 12 Championship goals while also making three assists. In May 2021, he won the club's end-of-season Player of the Year award with almost 60% of the votes. He started the 2021–22 season with six goals in 10 first team appearances before suffering a fibula injury ruling him out for eight weeks. In March 2022, after a somewhat lacklustre return to the first team, Powell was sidelined for another six weeks with a new quad muscle injury. He returned for the final two matches of the season as Stoke finished in 14th. At the end of the season Powell signed a one-year contract extension. In 2022–23 Powell scored four goals in 26 appearances and was released at the end of the season.

=== Stockport County ===
Following his release by Stoke, Powell joined League Two side Stockport County on a three-year contract, and helped the club to the 2023–24 League Two title and promotion to League One.

=== Bradford City ===
On 18 August 2025, Powell signed for Bradford City following a mutual agreement to terminate his contract with Stockport County. After Powell had considered retirement in January 2026, his contract was extended in August 2026.

== International career ==
Powell has represented England at under-16, under-17, under-18, under-19 and under-21 levels. On 5 November 2009, he made his debut for the under-16 team in a 2–0 win against Northern Ireland. On 25 August 2010, Powell made his debut against Turkey for the under-17 side. On 28 August 2010, Powell scored a free-kick for the under-17s in a 4–0 win against Australia in the FA Men's under-17 International Tournament. He played in the 2011 UEFA European U-17 Football Championship, with England making it to the semi-final and Powell scoring against France in the group stage. Powell made his under-18 debut in a 3–0 win against Poland on 7 March 2012 at Crewe's Alexandra Stadium. He scored on his under-19 debut against Germany on 6 September 2012. He was called up to the under-21 squad for the first time on 3 October 2012, for the play-off games against Serbia. He made his debut on 13 November, playing the full 90 minutes of a 2–0 win against Northern Ireland at Bloomfield Road.

== Career statistics ==
As of 22 November 2026

Appearances and goals by club, season and competition
Club	Season	League			FA Cup		League Cup		Europe		Other		Total	
Club	Season	Division	Apps	Goals	Apps	Goals	Apps	Goals	Apps	Goals	Apps	Goals	Apps	Goals
Crewe Alexandra	2010–11	League Two	17	0	1	0	0	0	—		1 (Note: Appearance(s) in EFL Trophy)	0	19	0
Crewe Alexandra	2011–12	League Two	38	14	1	0	1	0	—		5 (Note: Two appearances in Football League Trophy, three in Football League Two play-offs)	2	45	16
Crewe Alexandra	Total		55	14	2	0	1	0	—		6	2	64	16
Manchester United	2012–13	Premier League	2	1	0	0	2	0	2 (Note: Appearance(s) in Champions League)	0	—		6	1
Manchester United	2013–14	Premier League	0	0	0	0	0	0	0	0	0	0	0	0
Manchester United	2014–15	Premier League	0	0	0	0	1	0	—		—		1	0
Manchester United	2015–16	Premier League	1	0	0	0	0	0	1	0	—		2	0
Manchester United	Total		3	1	0	0	3	0	3	0	0	0	9	1
Wigan Athletic (loan)	2013–14	Championship	31	7	3	2	1	0	6 (Note: Appearances in UEFA Europa League)	3	—		41	12
Leicester City (loan)	2014–15	Premier League	3	0	0	0	0	0	—		—		3	0
Hull City (loan)	2015–16	Championship	3	0	2	0	0	0	—		—		5	0
Wigan Athletic	2016–17	Championship	21	6	1	0	0	0	—		—		22	6
Wigan Athletic	2017–18	League One	39	15	6	0	0	0	—		—		45	15
Wigan Athletic	2018–19	Championship	32	8	0	0	0	0	—		—		32	8
Wigan Athletic	Total		92	29	7	0	0	0	—		—		99	29
Stoke City	2019–20	Championship	29	5	1	0	0	0	—		—		30	5
Stoke City	2020–21	Championship	39	12	0	0	3	0	—		—		42	12
Stoke City	2021–22	Championship	18	6	2	0	1	1	—		—		21	7
Stoke City	2022–23	Championship	25	4	1	0	0	0	—		—		26	4
Stoke City	Total		111	27	4	0	4	1	—		—		119	28
Stockport County	2023–24	League Two	32	3	2	0	0	0	—		2	0	36	3
Stockport County	2024–25	League One	7	0	0	0	0	0	—		2	1	9	1
Stockport County	Total		39	3	2	0	0	0	—		4	1	45	4
Bradford City	2025–26	League One	10	1	0	0	2	0	—		2 (Note: Appearances in League One play-offs)	0	14	1
Bradford City	2026–27	League One	14	2	1	2	3	1	—		3	4	21	9
Bradford City	Total		24	3	1	2	5	1	—		5	4	35	10
Career total			361	84	21	4	14	2	9	3	15	7	410	100

== Honours ==
Crewe Alexandra

- Football League Two play-offs: 2012

Wigan Athletic

- EFL League One: 2017–18

Stockport County

- EFL League Two: 2023–24

Individual

- Crewe Alexandra Player of the Year: 2011–12
- Crewe Alexandra Young Player of the Year: 2011–12
- Crewe Alexandra Goal of the Season: 2011–12
- Football League Two Apprentice of the Year: 2011–12
- PFA Team of the Year: 2017–18 League One
- Stoke City Player of the Year: 2021
