= 2019–20 Stoke City F.C. season =

Stoke City
2019–20 season
- Chairman: Peter Coates
- Manager: Nathan Jones (until 1 November 2019); Rory Delap (caretaker) (until 8 November 2019); Michael O'Neill (from 8 November 2019)
- Stadium: bet365 Stadium
- Championship: 15th
- FA Cup: Third round
- EFL Cup: Third round
- Top goalscorer: League: Sam Clucas (11); All: Sam Clucas (11)
- Highest home attendance: 25,436 v Cardiff City (22 February 2020)
- Lowest home attendance: 20,216 v Luton Town (10 December 2019)
Home colours	Away colours

The 2019–20 season was Stoke City's 103rd season in the Football League, and the 43rd in the second tier.

Stoke manager Nathan Jones brought in ten new players ahead of the 2019–20 season in order to play in his preferred 'diamond' formation. These changes failed to improve the team and they began the season in terrible form collecting just eight points from the first 14 matches which lead to Jones being sacked by the club on 1 November 2019. He was replaced by the Northern Ireland manager Michael O'Neill. He had an instant impact as the team beat relegation rivals Barnsley, Wigan Athletic and Luton Town, however they went into Boxing Day bottom of the Championship table before a dramatic late victory over Sheffield Wednesday lifted them out of the relegation zone.

Stoke began 2020 well, beating Huddersfield Town 5–2 and also registering wins over promotion contenders West Bromwich Albion and Swansea City. Poor defeats against Derby County and Queens Park Rangers prevented the side from pulling clear of the bottom three, until a 5–1 win over Hull City at the beginning of March. The EFL was suspended on 13 March due to the COVID-19 pandemic. The EFL returned on 20 June with the final nine matches played behind closed doors. Stoke won four of the nine and finished in 15th position, eight points clear of the relegation zone.

== Pre-season ==
Stoke announced their retained list in May 2019, the most notable departures were the veteran Scottish duo Charlie Adam and Darren Fletcher and reserve goalkeeper Jakob Haugaard. Stoke returned to training on 26 June 2019 with Jones making six new signings. In came goalkeeper Adam Davies, defenders Liam Lindsay and Stephen Ward, midfielders Jordan Cousins and Nick Powell and striker Lee Gregory. Stoke played a training match against Leek Town at Clayton Wood on 5 July, winning 6–0. The squad then traveled to De Lutte on the Dutch-German border for a week-long a training camp. Stoke played out a 1–1 draw against German 3. Liga side MSV Duisburg with Sam Clucas cancelling out Vincent Vermeij's strike. Stoke's first domestic friendly saw them beat National League side Wrexham 3–1. This was followed up with a 2–0 win at League One Tranmere Rovers and a 2–1 victory at Lincoln City with a brace from Campbell. Stoke ended pre-season with a 2–1 home defeat to Leicester City, with Ryan Shawcross suffering up a serious injury.

Date	Opponent	Venue	Result	Scorers	Report
5 July 2019	Leek Town	H	6–0	Campbell (2) 25', 33', Afobe 58', Vokes (3) 63', 67', 68'	Report
13 July 2019	MSV Duisburg	A	1–1	Clucas 67'	Report
17 July 2019	Wrexham	A	3–1	Campbell 5', Vokes (2) 69', 79'	Report
20 July 2019	Tranmere Rovers	A	2–0	Smith 54', Batth 85'	Report
24 July 2019	Lincoln City	A	2–1	Campbell (2) 10', 21'	Report
27 July 2019	Leicester City	H	1–2	Powell 70'	Report

== Championship ==
=== August ===
For the season opener against Queens Park Rangers, manager Nathan Jones started three of his new signings Tommy Smith, Jordan Cousins and Nick Powell as well as handing 18-year-old Nathan Collins his first league start. Stoke made a bad start as Jordan Hugill took advantage of a mistake from Jack Butland after only seven minutes and Eberechi Eze doubled Rangers' advantage early in the second half. Sam Clucas pulled one back but the match finished 2–1 to QPR. Stoke lost their first away match of the season 3–1 at newly promoted Charlton Athletic. Stoke conceded after just two minutes against Derby County, Martyn Waghorn finding the net. Stoke went in front after two goals from Scott Hogan but a penalty from Waghorn denied the Potters victory. Against Preston North End goalkeeper Jack Butland made two horrendous first-half errors gifting the Lillywhites a 2–0 lead. Preston added to their lead in the second half with James McClean getting a late consolation. The result increased the pressure on manager Nathan Jones who questioned Butland's state of mind. Jones made six changes to his side for the visit of Leeds with Allen, Batth and Butland being dropped. It had no impact however as Leeds ran out 3–0 winners. Stoke ended August with only a point after a 2–1 defeat at Birmingham City.

=== September ===
Following the international break, Jones again made a number of changes against Bristol City with most notably the return of Badou Ndiaye. Stoke made a good start with Clucas scoring after four minutes but soon after Joe Allen was shown a red card for a foul on Josh Brownhill and Stoke were unable to see the game out with ten men, losing 2–1. Stoke then made their final league trip to Brentford's Griffin Park where they played out an uninspiring goalless draw. Stoke lost again the following week, 3–2 at home to Nottingham Forest.

=== October ===
The first match of October was against Huddersfield Town who like Stoke, had made a bad start to the season. It was a match of poor quality which was won late on by the Terriers leaving Stoke cut adrift at the bottom of the table. There was confusion following the match as it appeared that Jones had admitted that he would be sacked but then took media duties for the next game against Swansea City days later. Stoke made a terrible start to the match as André Ayew scored inside the first minute. Stoke recovered though and levelled through Sam Clucas and they went on to earn their first victory of the season with a late goal from Scott Hogan. Following the international break Stoke took on promotion favorites Fulham. A first league goal from Tyrese Campbell and a penalty from Gregory saw the Potters win 2–0 lifting themselves off the bottom of the table and ended a club record run of home games without a victory. Stoke then lost 1–0 at Sheffield Wednesday, with a mistake from Liam Lindsay gifting Massimo Luongo a simple chance to score. City suffered another damaging defeat, their tenth of the season away at Millwall.

=== November ===
Jones was sacked by Stoke on 1 November 2019. Rory Delap took caretaker charge of the team for the next match, a 2–0 home defeat to promotion chasing West Bromwich Albion. Northern Ireland manager Michael O'Neill was appointed on 8 November just before an important match against Barnsley. O'Neill set the side up in a more familiar 4–3–3 formation which paid off as Stoke made a great start with Clucas lobbing Tykes keeper Bradley Collins from halfway. Gregory then converted a penalty after McClean was brought down by Alex Mowatt. Cameron McGeehan pulled one back for Barnsley just after half time before two quick goals from Allen and Clucas put Stoke into a 4–1 lead. Barnsley substitute Patrick Schmidt added a late consolation to make it 4–2. The result ended a run of 88 games without scoring three or more in a match. O'Neill won his first home game 2–1 against Wigan Athletic on 23 November. Wigan took the lead through Sam Morsy after another defensive mistake from Butland and Edwards. Danny Batth equalised just after half time and deep into stoppage time Mame Biram Diouf scored his first goal since April 2018 to earn the three points. Stoke lost their next match 1–0 at Cardiff City, and ended November with a 2–1 defeat against Blackburn Rovers.

=== December ===
Stoke lost 2–1 at Hull City on 7 December, despite taking an early lead through Sam Vokes. A pathetic second half display saw Jarrod Bowen score twice and Stoke failed to trouble the Tigers' goalkeeper which prompted an angry reaction from the traveling support. The players responded by beating relegation rivals Luton Town 3–0. City then played out a dreadful goalless draw against Reading where neither side registered a shot on target. Stoke began the Christmas period with a 2–1 defeat at Middlesbrough. Stoke seemed destined for another defeat against Sheffield Wednesday on Boxing Day after two quick goals from Morgan Fox and Tom Lees had cancelled out McClean's first half opener. Stoppage time goals from Campbell and Vokes earned Stoke a 3–2 victory and moved the side out of the bottom three for the first time this season. Stoke ended a forgettable 2019 with a 1–0 loss at Fulham.

=== January ===
Stoke began 2020 with a resounding victory away at Huddersfield Town. Vokes had given Stoke a first half lead but two quick Terriers goals following the restart turned the game in their favour. But Stoke rallied and goals from Powell, Gregory and a brace from Campbell gave City a 5–2 win. After their FA Cup exit at Brentford, Stoke then played out an uneventful goalless draw with Millwall. Stoke then claimed their most important victory of the season on 20 January, beating top of the table West Bromwich Albion 1–0 with an early goal from Campbell. Stoke continued their revival with a 2–0 home win against Swansea City with goals from Clucas and McClean. Stoke ended January with a heavy defeat at Phillip Cocu's Derby County.

In the January transfer window Stoke cancelled the loans of Cameron Carter-Vickers, Mark Duffy and Scott Hogan, whilst also letting Peter Etebo, Badou Ndiaye and Ryan Woods leave on loan. Into the team came Northern Irish midfielder Jordan Thompson from Blackpool, centre-back James Chester on loan from Aston Villa and young midfielder Tashan Oakley-Boothe from Tottenham Hotspur.

=== February ===
Stoke started February with a comfortable 3–1 victory against Charlton Athletic with goals from Ince, McClean and Powell. This was followed by a 2–0 loss to Preston where wingers, McClean and Verlinden both picked up knee injuries. The team suffered another heavy away defeat this time going down 4–2 at Queens Park Rangers, having taken a 2–0 lead. Stoke made amends the following week, beating play-off chasing Cardiff City 2–0 and gaining a goalless draw at in-form Blackburn Rovers. Stoke then began a run of fixtures against their relegation rivals with a 1–1 draw at Luton Town, with a late James Collins penalty cancelling out Vokes' opener.

=== March, April & May ===
The only game in March saw Stoke easily defeat Hull City 5–1, with Clucas and Powell both scoring twice and Campbell slotting in a penalty, although there was a bad moment through as Joe Allen suffered a season-ending ankle injury. On 13 March The EFL was suspended until 3 April due to the COVID-19 pandemic. This was extended until 30 April, but was then suspended indefinitely on 3 April 2020. On 11 May 2020 the UK government confirmed there will be no professional sport in England until 1 June 2020 at the earliest.

During the crisis Stoke allowed the NHS to set up a drive-through test centre on the Bet365 Stadium east car park whilst a local company used the north car park to fulfill a government contract to make equipment for the NHS Nightingale Hospitals. Championship squads returned to training on 25 May with the intention to finish the season behind closed doors, with some temporary new rules including five substitutes being allowed.

=== June ===
The provisional fixture list for the remaining nine matches was announced on 8 June 2020. Stoke's preparations for the season restart were disrupted after manager O'Neill tested positive for coronavirus on 9 June which caused a training match against Manchester United to be cancelled. Stoke played two ninety-minute practice matches against Derby County on 13 June 2020. O'Neill was able to return to work on 19 June after displaying no symptoms.

Stoke drew their first match of the restart 1–1 away at Reading with a 92nd-minute header from Nick Powell cancelling out Lucas João's early strike. City then suffered a poor 2–0 defeat against relegation rivals Middlesbrough which saw Powell sent-off late on for two bookable offences. This was followed by a shambolic performance at Wigan Athletic who easily outplayed Stoke winning 3–0 with O'Neill questioning the players desire and attitude.

=== July ===
The players responded by beating relegation rivals Barnsley 4–0 with Campbell scoring twice. They were then heavily beaten 5–0 at league leaders Leeds United. Stoke secured a vital 2–0 victory against out of form Birmingham City on 12 July, lifting the team four points above the relegation zone with three games remaining. City continued to edge closer to safety with a 1–1 draw at Bristol City, Danny Batth's powerful 64th-minute header cancelling out Filip Benković's first half opener. Stoke secured their Championship status with a 1–0 win against promotion chasing Brentford, with Lee Gregory scoring after Bees' keeper David Raya spilled a shot from Clucas. Stoke ended the 2019–20 season with a 4–1 victory at Nottingham Forest a result which saw Forest dramatically miss out on a play-off place, whilst Stoke finished the campaign in 15th position.

=== Results ===
Match	Date	Opponent	Venue	Result	Attendance	Scorers	Report
1	3 August 2019	Queens Park Rangers	H	1–2	24,004	Clucas 78'	Report
2	10 August 2019	Charlton Athletic	A	1–3	17,848	Ince 37'	Report
3	17 August 2019	Derby County	H	2–2	23,863	Hogan (2) 32', 55'	Report
4	21 August 2019	Preston North End	A	1–3	11,973	McClean 89'	Report
5	24 August 2019	Leeds United	H	0–3	24,090		Report
6	31 August 2019	Birmingham City	A	1–2	20,652	Lindsay 58'	Report
7	14 September 2019	Bristol City	H	1–2	22,357	Clucas 4'	Report
8	21 September 2019	Brentford	A	0–0	11,870		Report
9	27 September 2019	Nottingham Forest	H	2–3	23,800	Gregory 10', McClean 84'	Report
10	1 October 2019	Huddersfield Town	H	0–1	20,372		Report
11	5 October 2019	Swansea City	A	2–1	16,612	Clucas 22', Hogan 90'	Report
12	19 October 2019	Fulham	H	2–0	23,189	Campbell 16', Gregory 80' (pen)	Report
13	22 October 2019	Sheffield Wednesday	A	0–1	22,460		Report
14	26 October 2019	Millwall	A	0–2	14,008		Report
15	4 November 2019	West Bromwich Albion	H	0–2	22,360		Report
16	9 November 2019	Barnsley	A	4–2	14,891	Clucas (2) 8', 67', Gregory 30' (pen), Allen 64'	Report
17	23 November 2019	Wigan Athletic	H	2–1	22,530	Batth 55', Diouf 90+3'	Report
18	26 November 2019	Cardiff City	A	0–1	20,884		Report
19	30 November 2019	Blackburn Rovers	H	1–2	22,292	Evans 80' (o.g.)	Report
20	7 December 2019	Hull City	A	1–2	11,019	Vokes 7'	Report
21	10 December 2019	Luton Town	H	3–0	20,216	McClean 35', Allen (2) 45+2', 50'	Report
22	14 December 2019	Reading	H	0–0	21,701		Report
23	20 December 2019	Middlesbrough	A	1–2	18,270	Clucas 53'	Report
24	26 December 2019	Sheffield Wednesday	H	3–2	25,359	McClean 11', Campbell 90+3', Vokes 90+7'	Report
25	29 December 2019	Fulham	A	0–1	18,747		Report
26	1 January 2020	Huddersfield Town	A	5–2	21,933	Vokes 15', Powell 57', Campbell (2) 66', 70', Gregory 90'	Report
27	11 January 2020	Millwall	H	0–0	22,515		Report
28	20 January 2020	West Bromwich Albion	A	1–0	23,199	Campbell 9'	Report
29	25 January 2020	Swansea City	H	2–0	22,593	Clucas 55', McClean 90+1'	Report
30	31 January 2020	Derby County	A	0–4	27,984		Report
31	8 February 2020	Charlton Athletic	H	3–1	23,508	McClean 28', Ince 47', Powell 66'	Report
32	12 February 2020	Preston North End	H	0–2	20,418		Report
33	15 February 2020	Queens Park Rangers	A	2–4	13,125	Clucas 27', Campbell 31'	Report
34	22 February 2020	Cardiff City	H	2–0	25,436	Paterson 25' (o.g.), Allen 72'	Report
35	26 February 2020	Blackburn Rovers	A	0–0	12,343		Report
36	29 February 2020	Luton Town	A	1–1	10,070	Vokes 9'	Report
37	7 March 2020	Hull City	H	5–1	23,126	Powell (2) 11', 86', Clucas (2) 18', 50', Campbell 16' (pen)	Report
38	20 June 2020	Reading	A	1–1	—	Powell 90+2'	Report
39	27 June 2020	Middlesbrough	H	0–2	—		Report
40	30 June 2020	Wigan Athletic	A	0–3	—		Report
41	4 July 2020	Barnsley	H	4–0	—	Vokes 8', Campbell (2) 10', 38', Ince 87'	Report
42	9 July 2020	Leeds United	A	0–5	—		Report
43	12 July 2020	Birmingham City	H	2–0	—	Batth 12', Clucas 45'	Report
44	15 July 2020	Bristol City	A	1–1	—	Batth 64'	Report
45	18 July 2020	Brentford	H	1–0	—	Gregory 38'	Report
46	22 July 2020	Nottingham Forest	A	4–1	—	Batth 19', McClean 73', Gregory 78', da Costa 90+6' (o.g.)	Report

=== League table ===
Pos	Team	Pld	W	D	L	GF	GA	GD	Pts
12	Bristol City	46	17	12	17	60	65	−5	63
13	Queens Park Rangers	46	16	10	20	67	76	−9	58
14	Reading	46	15	11	20	59	58	+1	56
15	Stoke City	46	16	8	22	62	68	−6	56
16	Sheffield Wednesday	46	15	11	20	58	66	−8	56
17	Middlesbrough	46	13	14	19	48	61	−13	53
18	Huddersfield Town	46	13	12	21	52	70	−18	51

Source: EFL Official Website
Rules for classification: 1) Points; 2) Goal difference; 3) Number of goals scored; 4) Head-to-head results; 5) Wins; 6) Away goals; 7) Penalty points (sec 9.5); 8) 12-point sending off offences

== FA Cup ==
Stoke were knocked out of the FA Cup in the Third Round for a fourth season in a row, losing 1–0 at Brentford.

Round	Date	Opponent	Venue	Result	Attendance	Scorers	Report
R3	4 January 2020	Brentford	A	0–1	7,575		Report

== EFL Cup ==
Stoke were drawn away at Wigan Athletic in the first round of the EFL Cup. They won 1–0 with a first goal from Sam Vokes. Stoke faced Leeds United at Elland Road just three days after the sides met in the Championship. City took a 2–0 lead through Danny Batth and Sam Vokes before a Butland error gifted Leeds a way back and Hélder Costa sent the tie to penalties. With both sides scoring four each, Butland made it 5–4 and Jack Harrison missed to send Stoke through. Stoke were then knocked out on penalties in the third round by Crawley Town despite Vokes giving them a 23rd-minute lead.

Round	Date	Opponent	Venue	Result	Attendance	Scorers	Report
R1	12 August 2019	Wigan Athletic	A	1–0	3,821	Vokes 10'	Report
R2	27 August 2019	Leeds United	A	2–2 (5–4 pens)	30,002	Batth 39', Vokes 44'	Report
R3	24 September 2019	Crawley Town	A	1–1 (3–5 pens)	4,165	Vokes 23'	Report

== Squad statistics ==
No.	Pos.	Name	Championship		FA Cup		League Cup		Total		Discipline	
No.	Pos.	Name	Apps	Goals	Apps	Goals	Apps	Goals	Apps	Goals	Yellow card	Red card
1	GK	(England) Jack Butland	35	0	0	0	1	0	36	0	0	0
2	DF	(England) Tom Edwards	13	0	1	0	1	0	15	0	0	0
3	DF	(Republic of Ireland) Stephen Ward	15	0	0	0	2	0	17	0	3	0
4	MF	(Wales) Joe Allen	34(1)	4	0	0	0	0	34(1)	4	5	1
5	DF	(Scotland) Liam Lindsay	17(3)	1	1	0	2	0	20(3)	1	4	0
6	MF	(England) Danny Batth	40(3)	4	0	0	2	1	42(3)	5	4	0
7	MF	(England) Tom Ince	31(7)	3	1	0	1	0	33(7)	3	1	0
8	MF	(Nigeria) Peter Etebo	8(3)	0	0	0	0(3)	0	8(6)	0	1	0
9	FW	(Wales) Sam Vokes	18(18)	5	0(1)	0	3	3	21(19)	8	0	0
10	FW	(Democratic Republic of the Congo) Benik Afobe	1	0	0	0	0	0	1	0	0	0
11	MF	(Republic of Ireland) James McClean	33(3)	7	0	0	1	0	34(3)	7	10	0
12	DF	(United States) Cameron Carter-Vickers	12	0	0	0	2(1)	0	14(1)	0	2	0
12	DF	(Wales) James Chester	13(3)	0	0	0	0	0	13(3)	0	0	0
14	DF	(England) Tommy Smith	27(3)	0	0	0	2	0	29(3)	0	5	0
15	DF	(Netherlands) Bruno Martins Indi	31(2)	0	1	0	1	0	33(2)	0	3	0
16	GK	(Wales) Adam Davies	4	0	1	0	0	0	5	0	0	0
17	DF	(England) Ryan Shawcross (c)	5	0	0	0	0	0	5	0	1	0
18	FW	(Senegal) Mame Biram Diouf	0(8)	1	0	0	0	0	0(8)	1	0	0
19	FW	(England) Lee Gregory	22(18)	6	1	0	0	0	23(18)	6	1	0
20	FW	(Republic of Ireland) Scott Hogan	4(9)	3	0	0	1(1)	0	5(10)	3	0	0
20	MF	(England) Tashan Oakley-Boothe	1(1)	0	0	0	0	0	1(1)	0	0	0
22	MF	(England) Sam Clucas	44	11	0	0	2	0	46	11	7	0
23	MF	(Belgium) Thibaud Verlinden	0(5)	0	0(1)	0	0	0	0(6)	0	0	0
24	MF	(England) Jordan Cousins	15(5)	0	1	0	2(1)	0	18(6)	0	3	0
25	MF	(England) Nick Powell	22(7)	5	1	0	0	0	23(7)	5	4	1
26	FW	(England) Tyrese Campbell	18(15)	9	1	0	2(1)	0	21(16)	9	3	0
27	MF	(Senegal) Badou Ndiaye	10(3)	0	0	0	0	0	10(3)	0	3	0
28	FW	(Belgium) Julien Ngoy	0(1)	0	0(1)	0	0	0	0(2)	0	0	0
31	MF	(England) Mark Duffy	1(5)	0	0	0	1(2)	0	2(7)	0	0	0
32	GK	(Australia) Adam Federici	7	0	0	0	2	0	9	0	0	0
33	MF	(Denmark) Lasse Sørensen	2(4)	0	0	0	0	0	2(4)	0	0	0
34	MF	(Northern Ireland) Jordan Thompson	8(7)	0	0	0	0	0	8(7)	0	2	0
35	DF	(England) Josh Tymon	1(1)	0	0	0	0	0	1(1)	0	1	0
37	DF	(Republic of Ireland) Nathan Collins	6(8)	0	1	0	2	0	9(8)	0	3	1
38	MF	(England) Ryan Woods	8	0	1	0	3	0	12	0	3	0
–	–	Own goals	–	3	–	0	–	0	–	3	–	–

== Transfers ==
=== In ===
Date	Pos.	Name	From	Fee	Ref.
25 June 2019	MF	(England) Jordan Cousins	(England) Queens Park Rangers	Free	
25 June 2019	GK	(Wales) Adam Davies	(England) Barnsley	Free	
25 June 2019	FW	(England) Lee Gregory	(England) Millwall	Free	
25 June 2019	DF	(Scotland) Liam Lindsay	(England) Barnsley	£2 million	
25 June 2019	MF	(England) Nick Powell	(England) Wigan Athletic	Free	
26 June 2019	DF	(Republic of Ireland) Stephen Ward	(England) Burnley	Free	
15 July 2019	DF	(England) Tommy Smith	(England) Huddersfield Town	Undisclosed	
9 August 2019	DF	(England) Ash Kigbu	(Austria) Wolfsberger AC	Undisclosed	
17 January 2020	MF	(Northern Ireland) Jordan Thompson	(England) Blackpool	Undisclosed	
31 January 2020	MF	(England) Tashan Oakley-Boothe	(England) Tottenham Hotspur	Undisclosed	

=== Out ===
Date	Pos.	Name	To	Fee	Ref.
30 June 2019	MF	(Scotland) Charlie Adam	(England) Reading	Free	
30 June 2019	MF	(Scotland) Darren Fletcher	Released	Free	
30 June 2019	GK	(Denmark) Jakob Haugaard	Released	Free	
30 June 2019	GK	(Hungary) Máté Deczki	(Hungary) Ajka	Free	
30 June 2019	GK	(Hungary) Daniel Gyollai	(England) Wigan Athletic	Free	
30 June 2019	DF	(France) Moussa Niakate	Released	Free	
30 June 2019	DF	(England) Simranjit Thandi	(Cyprus) AEK Larnaca	Free	
30 June 2019	MF	(England) Jacob Twyford	Released	Free	
30 June 2019	MF	(England) Mark Waddington	(England) Barrow	Free	
8 July 2019	DF	(Netherlands) Erik Pieters	(England) Burnley	Undisclosed fee	
25 July 2019	MF	(United States) Geoff Cameron	(England) Queens Park Rangers	Free	
6 August 2019	FW	(Spain) Bojan Krkić	(Canada) Montreal Impact	Mutual consent	
7 August 2019	FW	(Burundi) Saido Berahino	(Belgium) Zulte Waregem	Mutual consent	
17 January 2020	MF	(England) Daniel Jarvis	(Wales) Wrexham	Undisclosed	
24 February 2020	MF	(Democratic Republic of the Congo) Giannelli Imbula	(Russia) Sochi	Free	

=== Loans in ===
Date from	Pos.	Name	From	Date to	Ref.
7 August 2019	FW	(Republic of Ireland) Scott Hogan	(England) Aston Villa	29 January 2020	
8 August 2019	DF	(United States) Cameron Carter-Vickers	(England) Tottenham Hotspur	2 January 2020	
8 August 2019	MF	(England) Mark Duffy	(England) Sheffield United	31 January 2020	
31 January 2020	DF	(Wales) James Chester	(England) Aston Villa	End of season	

=== Loans out ===
Date from	Pos.	Name	To	Date to	Ref.
17 July 2019	DF	(England) Josh Tymon	(Portugal) Famalicão	1 January 2020	
18 July 2019	DF	(Australia) Harry Souttar	(England) Fleetwood Town	30 June 2020	
2 August 2019	GK	(England) Josef Bursik	(England) Accrington Stanley	30 June 2020	
8 August 2019	FW	(Democratic Republic of the Congo) Benik Afobe	(England) Bristol City	30 June 2020	
28 August 2019	DF	(Austria) Moritz Bauer	(Scotland) Celtic	30 June 2020	
31 August 2019	MF	(Democratic Republic of the Congo) Giannelli Imbula	(Italy) Lecce	30 June 2020	
31 August 2019	DF	(Austria) Kevin Wimmer	(Belgium) Mouscron	30 June 2020	
2 September 2019	FW	(Belgium) Thibaud Verlinden	(England) Bolton Wanderers	1 January 2020	
10 October 2019	MF	(England) Adam Porter	(England) Leek Town	January 2020	
24 November 2019	MF	(England) Ethan Stanton	(England) Market Drayton Town	December 2019	
5 January 2020	MF	(Senegal) Badou Ndiaye	(Turkey) Trabzonspor	30 June 2020	
8 January 2020	MF	(Nigeria) Peter Etebo	(Spain) Getafe	30 June 2020	
10 January 2020	FW	(Republic of Ireland) Ethon Varian	(England) Nantwich Town	Work experience	
16 January 2020	MF	(Wales) Tom Sparrow	(England) Kidsgrove Athletic	February 2020	
17 January 2020	MF	(England) Ryan Woods	(England) Millwall	30 June 2020	
18 February 2020	FW	(Netherlands) Abdul Sankoh	(England) Kidsgrove Athletic	March 2020	
