= 2009–10 Oldham Athletic A.F.C. season =

Oldham Athletic A.F.C.
2009–10 season
- Chairman: Simon Blitz
- Manager: Dave Penney (until 6 May); Paul Dickov (from 9 June)
- Football League One: 16th
- FA Cup: First round
- League Cup: First round
- Football League Trophy: First round
- Top goalscorer: League: Paweł Abbott (13); All: Paweł Abbott (13)
- Highest home attendance: 8,569 (1 November vs Huddersfield Town)
- Lowest home attendance: 1,619 (1 September 2009 vs Accrington Stanley)
- Average home league attendance: 4,630
Home colours	Away colours	Third colours

The 2009–10 season was Oldham Athletic's 11th season in the third tier of the English football league system, and their 114th overall. The first-team squad was led by manager Dave Penney in his first season with the club, following the departure of former manager John Sheridan in the previous season.

== Results ==
=== Legend ===
Win	Draw	Loss

=== Pre-season and friendlies ===
Date	Opponent	Venue	Result	Scorers
13 July 2009	Hyde United	A	2–0	Whitaker 13', Alessandra 42'
16 July 2009	FC Halifax Town	A	1–2	O'Grady
18 July 2009	Bury	A	0–0	
21 July 2009	Macclesfield Town	A	2–1	Parker 5', O'Grady 90'
25 July 2009	Sunderland	H	1–2	Abbott 55'
28 July 2009	Stalybridge Celtic	A	3–3	Stephens (2)
30 July 2009	Middlesbrough	H	2–2	Taylor 6', Parker
1 August 2009	Blackpool	H	2–4	Abbott, Furman 15'

=== League One ===
The 2009–10 Football League One fixtures were released on 17 June 2009, with Oldham Athletic opening their league campaign versus local rivals Stockport County on 8 August 2009. In Dave Penney's first competitive game in charge of the club, Oldham were held a scoreless draw against Stockport County. Despite having numerous shots, Owain Fôn Williams kept the Latics out of goal to keep the two teams level at 0–0 for the full 90 minutes.

=== League One ===
8 August 2009 1	Oldham Athletic	0–0	Stockport County	Oldham
	Whitaker (yellow card) 78'	Report	Havern (yellow card) 66'; Williams (yellow card) 90'	Stadium: Boundary Park; Attendance: 6,918; Referee: Oliver Langford

15 August 2009 2	Leyton Orient	1–2	Oldham Athletic	London
	Jarvis 31'; Demetriou (yellow card) 34'; Purches (yellow card) 44'; Thornton (yellow card) 58'	Report	Abbott 12', 59' (pen.); Holdsworth (yellow card) 25'; Gilbert (yellow card) 28'; Parker (yellow card) 34'; Worthington (yellow card) 62'; Marrow (yellow card) 75'	Stadium: Brisbane Road; Attendance: 4,061; Referee: Graham Scott

18 August 2009 3	Millwall	2–0	Oldham Athletic	London
	Martin 12'; Craig (yellow card) 30'; Fuseini (yellow card) 32'; Friend (yellow card) 38'; Harris (yellow card) 78' (goal) 90'	Report	Taylor (yellow card) 32'; Worthington (yellow card) 69'; Furman (yellow card) 77'	Stadium: The Den; Attendance: 7,369; Referee: Andy D' Urso

23 August 2009 4	Oldham Athletic	2–2	Swindon Town	Oldham
	Worthington (yellow card) 36'; Marrow 37'; Lee 90+4'	Report	McGovern 83'; Paynter 89'	Stadium: Boundary Park; Attendance: 4,229; Referee: Mark Haywood

29 August 2009 5	Brentford	1–1	Oldham Athletic	Brentford
	O'Connor 43' (pen.)	Report	Blackman 52'	Stadium: Griffin Park; Attendance: 5,125; Referee: Grant Hegley

4 September 2009 6	Oldham Athletic	0–3	Hartlepool United	Oldham
		Report	Jones (yellow card) 18'; Brown 21'; McSweeney 37'; Behan 60'	Stadium: Boundary Park; Attendance: 4,014; Referee: Rob Shoebridge

12 September 2009 7	Bristol Rovers	1–0	Oldham Athletic	Bristol
	Anthony (yellow card) 54'; Kuffour 90'	Report	Marrow (yellow card) 27'; Sheehan (yellow card) 38'	Stadium: Eastville Stadium; Attendance: 6,674; Referee: Steve Bratt

19 September 2009 8	Oldham Athletic	2–0	Carlisle United	Oldham
	Abbott 13'; Parker 52'	Report	Kavanagh (yellow card) 31'; Livesey (yellow card) 84'	Stadium: Boundary Park; Attendance: 4,268; Referee: Phil Gibbs

26 September 2009 9	Southend United	0–1	Oldham Athletic	Southend-on-Sea
	Christophe (yellow card) 34'; Barnard (yellow card) 86'	Report	Abbott 76'; Taylor (yellow card) 80'; Furman (yellow card) 90'	Stadium: Roots Hall; Attendance: 6,979; Referee: Keith Hill

29 September 2009 10	Oldham Athletic	2–1	Milton Keynes Dons	Oldham
	Sheehan 8'; Marrow (yellow card) 9'; Parker 70'	Report	Doumbé (yellow card) 6'; Leven (yellow card) 26'; Howell (yellow card) 45'; Lewington (yellow card) 46'; Brill 87' (o.g.); Johnson (yellow card) 88'	Stadium: Boundary Park; Attendance: 3,630; Referee: Tony Bates

3 October 2009 11	Oldham Athletic	0–0	Yeovil Town	Oldham
	Worthington (yellow card) 57'	Report	Kalala (yellow card) 25'; Davies (yellow card) 35'; Tomlin (yellow card) 64'; Smith (yellow card) 90'	Stadium: Boundary Park; Attendance: 4,208; Referee: Nigel Miller

10 October 2009 12	Charlton Athletic	0–0	Oldham Athletic	London
		Report	Lomax (yellow card) 71'; Brill (yellow card) 85'	Stadium: The Valley; Attendance: 16,441; Referee: Graham Horwood

17 October 2009 13	Oldham Athletic	1–3	Southampton	Oldham
	Abbott 65'; Lomax (yellow card) 76'	Report	Hammond 12'; Lambert 23'; Connolly 82' (yellow card) 83'	Stadium: Boundary Park; Attendance: 5,341; Referee: Dave Foster

24 October 2009 14	Brighton & Hove Albion	0–2	Oldham Athletic	Brighton and Hove
		Report	Gregan (yellow card) 56'; Abbott 57' (yellow card) 81'; Furman (yellow card) 62'; Hazell 81'	Stadium: Withdean Stadium; Attendance: 6,205; Referee: Dean Whitestone

1 November 2009 15	Oldham Athletic	0–1	Huddersfield Town	Oldham
	Hazell (yellow card) 59'; Holdsworth (yellow card) 61'; Abbott (yellow card) 63'	Report	Williams 59'; Rhodes (yellow card) 60'; Smithies (yellow card) 90'	Stadium: Boundary Park; Attendance: 8,569; Referee: Trevor Kettle

14 November 2009 16	Gillingham	1–0	Oldham Athletic	Gillingham
	Weston 61' (pen.)	Report	Taylor (yellow card) 45'; Marrow (yellow card) 69'; Holdsworth (yellow card) 79'; Furman (yellow card) 82'; Hazell (yellow card) 87'; Parker (yellow card) 89'	Stadium: Priestfield Stadium; Attendance: 4,787; Referee: Mike Russell

21 November 2009 17	Oldham Athletic	2–2	Colchester United	Oldham
	Colbeck (yellow card) 52'; Taylor 63' (pen.); Brooke 88'	Report	Fox 12'; Tierney (yellow card) 41' (yellow-red card) 56'; Odejayi 50'; White (yellow card) 90'	Stadium: Boundary Park; Attendance: 3,607; Referee: Eddie Ilderton

24 November 2009 18	Walsall	3–0	Oldham Athletic	Walsall
	O'Keefe (yellow card) 2'; Deeney 20', 80'; Hughes (yellow card) 34'; Jones 45'; Sansara (yellow card) 74'	Report	Hills (red card) 43'; Smalley (yellow card) 52'; Parker (yellow card) 89'	Stadium: Bescot Stadium; Attendance: 3,191; Referee: Andy Woolmer

1 December 2009 19	Oldham Athletic	0–2	Leeds United	Oldham
	Marrow (yellow card) 43'; Black (yellow card) 58'	Report	Kilkenny 37'; Becchio 82'	Stadium: Boundary Park; Attendance: 7,793; Referee: Colin Webster

5 December 2009 20	Norwich City	2–0	Oldham Athletic	Norwich
	Holt 21'; Hoolahan 32'	Report	Furman (yellow card) 27'; Gregan (yellow card) 80'	Stadium: Carrow Road; Attendance: 24,404; Referee: David Phillips

12 December 2009 21	Oldham Athletic	2–0	Exeter City	Oldham
	Colbeck (yellow card) 13'; Smalley (yellow card) 27' (goal) 51'; Gregan (yellow card) 57'; Heffernan 58'; Marrow (yellow card) 79'; Stephens (yellow card) 90'	Report	Duffy (yellow card) 56'	Stadium: Boundary Park; Attendance: 6,230; Referee: Jock Waugh

19 December 2009 22	Wycombe Wanderers	2–2	Oldham Athletic	Wycombe
	Akinde 9' (red card) 22'; Doherty (yellow card) 50'; Harold 88' (pen.)	Report	Stephens (yellow card) 13'; Furman (yellow card) 24'; Smalley (yellow card) 34'; Whitaker 45'; Hazell 51' (yellow card) 81'; Lee (yellow card) 67'	Stadium: Adams Park; Attendance: 4,160; Referee: Danny McDermid

2 January 2010 23	Hartlepool United	2–1	Oldham Athletic	Hartlepool
	Jones 32'; Monkhouse 40'; Hartley (yellow card) 82' (red card) 83'	Report	Goodwin (yellow card) 51'; Gregan (yellow card) 83'; Abbott 88'	Stadium: Victoria Park; Attendance: 2,634; Referee: Carl Boyeson

20 January 2010 24	Oldham Athletic	0–0	Tranmere Rovers	Oldham
	Marrow (yellow card) 44'	Report	Logan (yellow card) 55'	Stadium: Boundary Park; Attendance: 3,688; Referee: Craig Pawson

23 January 2010 25	Oldham Athletic	0–1	Millwall	Oldham
	Gregan (yellow card) 56'	Report	Martin (yellow card) 25'; Craig (yellow card) 44'; Schofield (yellow card) 53'; Harris 57' (pen.); Smith (yellow card) 72'; Morison (yellow card) 76'; Ward (yellow card) 90'	Stadium: Boundary Park; Attendance: 3,656; Referee: Andy Haines

6 February 2010 26	Tranmere Rovers	0–1	Oldham Athletic	Birkenhead
	Goodison (yellow card) 65'	Report	Abbott 41'; Stephens (yellow card) 73'; Smalley (yellow card) 85'	Stadium: Prenton Park; Attendance: 5,518; Referee: Chris Sarginson

9 February 2010 27	Swindon Town	4–2	Oldham Athletic	Swindon
	Paynter 45' 45' (pen.); Austin 48'; Ward 58'	Report	Colbeck 79'; Hazell (yellow card) 81'; Price 90'	Stadium: County Ground; Attendance: 6,183; Referee: Darren Deadman

13 February 2010 28	Oldham Athletic	1–0	Walsall	Oldham
	Smalley (yellow card) 34'; Abbott 78'	Report	Deeney (yellow card) 45'; Westlake (yellow card) 77'; Byfield (yellow card) 90'; McDonald (yellow card) 90'	Stadium: Boundary Park; Attendance: 3,968; Referee: Kevin Wright

20 February 2010 29	Colchester United	1–0	Oldham Athletic	Colchester
	Prutton (yellow card) 56'; Batth 64'	Report		Stadium: Colchester Community Stadium; Attendance: 5,321; Referee: James Linington

23 February 2010 30	Leeds United	2–0	Oldham Athletic	Leeds
	Lowry (yellow card) 13'; Becchio 54', 61'	Report	Furman (yellow card) 15'; Taylor (yellow card) 24'; Smalley (yellow card) 25'; Gregan (yellow card) 58'	Stadium: Elland Road; Attendance: 17,635; Referee: Paul Taylor

27 February 2010 31	Oldham Athletic	0–1	Norwich City	Oldham
	Stephens (yellow card) 47'	Report	Holt 53'	Stadium: Boundary Park; Attendance: 5,344; Referee: Rob Shoebridge

6 March 2010 32	Exeter City	1–1	Oldham Athletic	Exeter
	Golbourne (yellow card) 50'; Harley 60' (pen.); Dunne (yellow card) 76'	Report	Stephens (yellow card) 15'; Hazell (yellow card) 59'; Furman (yellow card) 60'; Gregan 81'; Taylor (yellow card) 89'	Stadium: St James Park; Attendance: 4,997; Referee: Simon Hooper

9 March 2010 33	Oldham Athletic	2–0	Leyton Orient	Oldham
	Smalley 20'; Stephens 49'	Report	Chambers (yellow card) 53'; Daniels (yellow card) 75'	Stadium: Boundary Park; Attendance: 3,126; Referee: Geoff Eltringham

13 March 2010 34	Oldham Athletic	2–2	Wycombe Wanderers	Oldham
	Hazell 29' (yellow card) 36'; Abbott 90'	Report	Harrold 42' (pen.); Betsy 49'	Stadium: Boundary Park; Attendance: 3,846; Referee: Eddie Ilderton

16 March 2010 35	Stockport County	0–1	Oldham Athletic	Stockport
	Swailes (red card) 24'; Turnbull (yellow card) 55'; Mullins (yellow card) 90'	Report	Abbott 25' (pen.); Eaves (yellow card) 90'	Stadium: Edgeley Park; Attendance: 4,283; Referee: Jonathan Moss

20 March 2010 36	Oldham Athletic	0–2	Brighton & Hove Albion	Oldham
	Worthington (yellow card) 62'; Furman (yellow card) 85'; Eaves (yellow card) 90'	Report	Bennett 40'; Worthington 57' (o.g.); Elphick (yellow card) 81'; Navarro (yellow card) 85'	Stadium: Boundary Park; Attendance: 4,059; Referee: David Webb

30 March 2010 37	Oldham Athletic	2–3	Brentford	Oldham
	Abbott 22', 82'	Report	O'Connor (yellow card) 22'; MacDonald 30'; Balkestein 64'; Legge (yellow card) 67'; MacDonald 69'	Stadium: Boundary Park; Attendance: 2,833; Referee: Tony Bates

3 April 2010 38	Oldham Athletic	1–0	Gillingham	Oldham
	Gregan (yellow card) 40'; Guy 59'; Millar (yellow card) 74'	Report	Howe (yellow card) 71'; Nutter (yellow card) 75'	Stadium: Boundary Park; Attendance: 3,486; Referee: Carl Boyeson

6 April 2010 39	Huddersfield Town	2–0	Oldham Athletic	Huddersfield
	Robinson 38', 90'	Report	Lee (yellow card) 55' (yellow-red card) 75'	Stadium: Kirklees Stadium; Attendance: 14,561; Referee: Anthony Taylor

10 April 2010 40	Oldham Athletic	2–1	Bristol Rovers	Oldham
	Guy 48'; Smalley 88'	Report	Lines (yellow card) 9'; Elliott (yellow card) 45'; Kuffour 77'; Coles (yellow card) 87'	Stadium: Boundary Park; Attendance: 3,769; Referee: Mark Halsey

13 April 2010 41	Milton Keynes Dons	0–0	Oldham Athletic	Milton Keynes
		Report	Stephens (yellow card) 79'	Stadium: Stadium MK; Attendance: 8,528; Referee: Craig Pawson

17 April 2010 42	Carlisle United	1–2	Oldham Athletic	Carlisle
	Madine 69'	Report	Guy 59'; Stephens 64'; Furman (yellow card) 80'	Stadium: Brunton Park; Attendance: 4,484; Referee: Danny McDermid

20 April 2010 43	Southampton	0–0	Oldham Athletic	Southampton
	Harding (yellow card) 45'	Report	Abbott (yellow card) 63'; Marrow (yellow card) 72'	Stadium: St Mary's Stadium; Attendance: 18,366; Referee: Kevin Wright

24 April 2010 44	Oldham Athletic	2–2	Southend United	Oldham
	Whitaker 2'; Stephens (yellow card) 6'; Smalley (yellow card) 35'; Black 43'; Furman (yellow card) 89'	Report	Laurent 6'; Mvoto 75'; Crawford (yellow card) 78'	Stadium: Boundary Park; Attendance: 4,225; Referee: Steve Tanner

1 May 2010 45	Yeovil Town	3–0	Oldham Athletic	Yeovil
	Tomlin 18'; Kalala (yellow card) 68'; Williams 83', 90'	Report	Gregan (yellow card) 20'; Taylor (yellow card) 88'	Stadium: Huish Park; Attendance: 4,513; Referee: Jarnail Singh

8 May 2010 46	Oldham Athletic	0–2	Charlton Athletic	Oldham
	Gregan (yellow card) 54'	Report	Bailey 23'; Llera 48'; Sam (yellow card) 61'	Stadium: Boundary Park; Attendance: 5,686; Referee: Colin Webster

=== FA Cup ===
7 November 2009 1	Oldham Athletic	0–2	Leeds United	Oldham
	Furman (yellow card) 70'; Smalley (yellow card) 86'	Report	Howson (yellow card) 23' (goal) 36'; Kilkenny (yellow card) 54'; Grella 90'; Doyle (yellow card) 90'	Stadium: Boundary Park; Attendance: 5,552; Referee: Gavin Ward

=== League Cup ===
On 16 June 2009, the draws for the first round of the 2009–10 Football League Cup was drawn. Oldham Athletic was drawn against fellow League One club Carlisle United. Throughout the game, both teams remained scoreless until an 89th-minute winner was scored by Scott Dobie. The goal allowed Carlisle to advance with a 1–0 victory, as Oldham were eliminated in the first round of the Cup.

11 August 2009 1	Carlisle United	1–0	Oldham Athletic	Carlisle
	Kavanagh (yellow card) 59'; Dobie 89'	Report	Hazell (yellow card) 75'	Stadium: Brunton Park; Attendance: 2,509; Referee: Eddie Ilderton

=== Johnstone's Paint Trophy ===
On 15 August 2009, the First Round draw for the 2009–10 Football League Trophy was made on Soccer AM, where Oldham was drawn against League Two club Accrington Stanley. The Latics held a 1–0 lead at halftime after Danny Whitaker grabbed a goal in the 10th minute, though Accrington Stanley came back on level terms in the 60th minute due to an own goal by Oldham defender Sean Gregan. Phil Edwards scored the winning goal seven minutes later following a free kick, giving Accrington a 2–1 victory and knocking Oldham out of the competition in the First Round.

1 September 2009 1	Oldham Athletic	1–2	Accrington Stanley	Oldham
	Whitaker 10'; Hazell (yellow card) 59'; Gregan (yellow card) 66'	Report	Kempson (yellow card) 19'; Gregan 60' (o.g.); Edwards 67'; Grant (yellow card) 90'	Stadium: Boundary Park; Attendance: 1,619; Referee: Paul Tierney

== Squad statistics ==
Accurate as of end of season

No.	Pos.	Name	League One		FA Cup		League Cup		FL Trophy		Total		Discipline	
No.	Pos.	Name	Apps	Goals	Apps	Goals	Apps	Goals	Apps	Goals	Apps	Goals	Yellow card	Red card
1	GK	Dean Brill	28	0	0	0	1	0	1	0	30	0	1	0
2	DF	Hasney Aljofree	1	0	0	0	0	0	0	0	1	0	0	0
2	DF	Lee Hills	2	0	1	0	0	0	0	0	4	0	0	1
2	DF	Krisztian Timar	2	0	0	0	0	0	0	0	2	0	0	0
3	DF	Joe Jacobson	14+1	0	0	0	0	0	0	0	14+1	0	0	0
4	MF	Jon Worthington	12+5	0	0	0	1	0	0	0	13+5	0	5	0
5	MF	Andy Holdsworth	11+1	0	1	0	1	0	1	0	14+1	0	3	0
6	DF	Reuben Hazell	41	3	1	0	1	0	1	0	44	3	8	0
7	MF	Danny Whitaker	30+10	2	0+1	0	1	0	1	1	32+11	3	1	0
8	FW	Deane Smalley	23+6	3	1	0	0	0	0	0	24+6	3	8	0
9	FW	Paweł Abbott	38+1	13	0	0	0+1	0	1	0	39+2	13	3	0
11	FW	Chris O'Grady	0	0	0	0	1	0	0	0	1	0	0	0
11	FW	Lewis Guy	12	3	0	0	0	0	0	0	12	3	0	0
11	FW	Jason Price	7	1	0	0	0	0	0	0	7	1	0	0
12	DF	Kelvin Lomax	11+4	0	0	0	0	0	0	0	11+4	0	2	0
14	MF	Dean Furman	32+6	0	1	0	1	0	1	0	35+6	0	12	0
15	FW	Lewis Alessandra	0+1	0	0	0	0+1	0	0	0	0+2	0	0	0
16	MF	Sean Gregan	46	1	1	0	1	0	1	0	49	1	10	0
17	MF	Keigan Parker	17+10	2	1	0	0+1	0	0	0	18+11	2	3	0
18	MF	Chris Taylor	27+5	1	1	0	1	0	0	0	29+5	1	6	0
19	MF	Kieran Lee	16+8	1	0+1	0	0	0	1	0	17+9	1	1	1
20	MF	Dale Stephens	24+2	2	0	0	0	0	0	0	24+2	2	7	0
21	DF	Paul Black	12+1	1	0	0	0	0	0	0	12+1	1	1	0
22	FW	Ryan Brooke	2+13	1	0+1	0	0	0	0+1	0	2+15	1	0	0
25	MF	Chris Rowney	0+1	0	0	0	0	0	0+1	0	0+2	0	0	0
26	MF	Alex Marrow	26+6	1	1	0	0	0	1	0	7	1	1	0
27	DF	Peter Gilbert	5	0	0	0	1	0	0	0	6	0	1	0
27	FW	Kirk Millar	2+4	0	0	0	0	0	0	0	28+6	1	1	0
28	MF	Joe Colbeck	18+9	1	1	0	0	0	0	0	19+9	1	2	0
29	FW	Darren Byfield	0+3	0	0	0	1	0	0	0	1+3	0	0	0
29	FW	Djeny Bembo-Leta	0	0	0	0	0	0	0+1	0	0+1	0	0	0
30	FW	Nick Blackman	6+6	1	0	0	0	0	1	0	7+6	1	0	0
30	FW	Daniel Nardiello	2	0	0	0	0	0	0	0	2	0	0	0
33	DF	Jim Goodwin	8	0	0	0	0	0	0	0	8	0	1	0
33	FW	Paul Heffernan	4	1	0	0	0	0	0	0	4	1	0	0
33	DF	Alan Sheehan	8	1	0	0	0	0	1	0	9	1	1	0
37	GK	Darryl Flahavan	18	0	1	0	0	0	0	0	19	0	0	0
38	FW	Tom Eaves	0+15	0	0	0	0	0	0	0	0+15	0	2	0

== Transfers ==
=== In ===
Date	Pos.	Name	From	Fee
1 July 2009	GK	Dean Brill	Unattached	Free
22 July 2009	DF	Andy Holdsworth	Huddersfield Town	Undisclosed
23 July 2009	FW	Keigan Parker	Huddersfield Town	Undisclosed
24 July 2009	DF	Rene Steer	Arsenal	Undisclosed
25 July 2009	MF	Philip Ojapah	A.F.C. Liverpool	Undisclosed
28 July 2009	DF	Michael McKerr	Unattached	Free
6 August 2009	FW	Darren Byfield	Unattached	Free
6 August 2009	DF	Peter Gilbert	Unattached	Free
6 August 2009	GK	Przemysław Kazimierczak	Unattached	Free
1 September 2009	MF	Joe Colbeck	Bradford City	Undisclosed

=== Out ===
Date	Pos.	Name	To	Fee
23 July 2009	FW	Matthew Wolfenden	Wrexham	Free
7 August 2009	DF	Neal Eardley	Blackpool	Undisclosed
25 August 2009	FW	Darren Byfield	Walsall	
1 September 2009	GK	Przemysław Kazimierczak	Released	
1 September 2009	DF	Peter Gilbert	Northampton Town	

=== Loan in ===
Date From	Date To	Pos	Name	Loaned from
6 August 2009	January 2009	DF	Alex Marrow	Blackburn Rovers
20 August 2009	January 2009	FW	Nick Blackman	Blackburn Rovers
1 September 2009	1 October 2009	DF	Alan Sheehan	Leeds United

=== Loan out ===
Date From	Date To	Pos	Name	Loaned to
10 July 2009	30 June 2010	GK	Greg Fleming	Dunfermline Athletic
14 August 2009	14 September 2009	MF	Dale Stephens	Rochdale
20 August 2009	20 September 2009	FW	Lewis Alessandra	Chester City
21 August 2009	January 2010	FW	Chris O'Grady	Rochdale
28 August 2009	28 September 2009	MF	Philip Ojapah	Stalybridge Celtic

== Players ==
=== First-team squad ===
Squad at end of season

Note: Flags indicate national team as defined under FIFA eligibility rules; some limited exceptions apply. Players may hold more than one non-FIFA nationality.

No.	Pos.	Nation	Player
1	GK	ENG	Dean Brill
2	DF	ENG	Hasney Aljofree
3	DF	WAL	Joe Jacobson
4	MF	ENG	Jon Worthington
5	DF	ENG	Andy Holdsworth
6	DF	ENG	Reuben Hazell
7	MF	ENG	Danny Whitaker
8	FW	ENG	Deane Smalley
9	FW	POL	Pawel Abbott (Note: Abbott was born in York, England, but also qualified to represent Poland internationally through his mother and represented them at U-21 level.)
10	MF	ENG	Rob Purdie
11	FW	ENG	Lewis Guy (on loan from Doncaster Rovers)
12	DF	ENG	Kelvin Lomax
13	GK	SCO	Greg Fleming
14	MF	RSA	Dean Furman
15	FW	ENG	Lewis Alessandra
16	MF	ENG	Sean Gregan
17	FW	SCO	Keigan Parker
18	MF	ENG	Chris Taylor

No.	Pos.	Nation	Player
19	MF	ENG	Kieran Lee
20	MF	ENG	Dale Stephens
21	DF	ENG	Paul Black
22	FW	ENG	Ryan Brooke
23	GK	ENG	Josh Ollerenshaw
24	DF	ENG	Liam Dawson
25	MF	ENG	Chris Rowney
26	MF	ENG	Alex Marrow (on loan from Blackburn Rovers)
27	FW	NIR	Kirk Millar
28	MF	ENG	Joe Colbeck
29	FW	COD	Djeny Bembo-Leta
30	FW	WAL	Daniel Nardiello (Note: Nardiello was born in Coventry, England, but also qualified to represent Wales internationally through his father, the United States through his mother, and Italy and Puerto Rico through his grandparents, and made his international debut for Wales in May 2007.) (on loan from Bury)
31	MF	NIR	Philip McGrath
33	MF	IRL	Jim Goodwin (on loan from Huddersfield Town)
36	DF	NIR	Michael McKerr
37	GK	ENG	Darryl Flahavan (on loan from Crystal Palace)
38	FW	ENG	Tom Eaves

=== Left club during season ===
Note: Flags indicate national team as defined under FIFA eligibility rules; some limited exceptions apply. Players may hold more than one non-FIFA nationality.

No.	Pos.	Nation	Player
2	DF	ENG	Lee Hills (on loan from Crystal Palace)
2	DF	HUN	Krisztián Timár (on loan from Plymouth Argyle)
11	FW	ENG	Chris O'Grady (to Rochdale)
11	FW	WAL	Jason Price (on loan from Millwall)
13	GK	SCO	Greg Fleming (on loan to Dunfermline Athletic)
27	DF	WAL	Peter Gilbert (Note: Gilbert was born in Newcastle upon Tyne, England, but also qualified to represent Wales internationally and represented them at U-21 level.) (to Northampton Town)
28	GK	POL	Przemysław Kazimierczak (released)

No.	Pos.	Nation	Player
29	FW	JAM	Darren Byfield (Note: Byfield was born in Sutton Coldfield, England, but also qualified to represent Jamaica internationally and made his international debut for Jamaica in 2003.) (released)
30	FW	ENG	Nick Blackman (Note: Blackman was born in Salford, England, but also qualifies to represent Barbados internationally through his father, the Netherlands and Poland through his maternal grandparents, and Israel through other family members, and would make his international debut for Barbados in September 2019.) (on loan from Blackburn Rovers)
31	DF	HUN	Dávid Kálnoki-Kis (on loan from MTK)
33	DF	IRL	Alan Sheehan (on loan from Leeds United)
33	FW	IRL	Paul Heffernan (on loan from Doncaster Rovers)
34	FW	HUN	Patrick Tischler (on loan from MTK)
35	FW	HUN	Norbert Csiki (on loan from MTK)
