= 2008–09 Oldham Athletic A.F.C. season =

Oldham Athletic
2008–09 season
- Chairman: Simon Blitz
- Manager: John Sheridan (until 15 March 2009); Joe Royle (15 March – 2 May 2009); Dave Penney (as of 30 April 2009)
- Football League One: 10th
- Carling Cup: Second Round
- FA Cup: First Round
- Johnstone's Paint Trophy: First Round
- Top goalscorer: League: Lee Hughes (18); All: Lee Hughes (18)
- Highest home attendance: 8,901 vs Leicester City (18 October 2008)
- Lowest home attendance: 2,016 vs Morecambe (2 September 2008)
- Average home league attendance: 5,636
Home colours	Away colours	Third colours

The 2008–09 season was Oldham Athletic's 113th season and their 10th consecutive season in the third tier of the English football league system.

== Review ==
=== Pre-season and friendlies ===
Oldham Athletic was originally scheduled to play their first pre-season friendly versus Belgian First Division side, Cercle Brugge, on 15 July 2008, but the game was cancelled due to disputes between the two clubs. On 16 July, the Latics played their first friendly versus Rhyl of the Welsh Premier League at Belle Vue. Oldham won the game 3–0 as new midfielder Danny Whitaker scored in the 71st minute. The club's next pre-season friendly was a 2–1 victory over Grimsby Town three days later. Oldham included many new transfers in the line-up, as well as Demar Phillips who was on trial from Premier League club Stoke City. Deane Smalley won the match for Oldham with a goal just five minutes before the final whistle.

On 23 July, Oldham faced former-Premier League club Derby County at Boundary Park. Following a John Oster goal for Derby in the 16th minute, new striker Chris O'Grady put the Latics back level just six minutes later, with the game finishing in a 1–1 draw. Oldham once again faced Premier League competition on 29 July, as Hull City visited Boundary Park. The Latics would once again finish with a 1–1 draw, following goals from Caleb Folan for Hull and Lewis Alessandra for Oldham. The following day, Oldham faced Barrow at Holker Street. After two early goals, new midfielder Dale Stephens pulled Oldham back to 2–1 in the 17th minute, though Jason Walker scored his second of the game as Oldham lost their first match of the pre-season. Oldham's final pre-season friendly was on 2 August versus Bradford City. Omar Daley of Bradford City scored the only goal of the game, giving Bradford City a 1–0 victory over Oldham in both clubs's final pre-season games.

Win	Draw	Loss

Date	Opponent	Venue	Result	Scorers	Attendance
16 July 2008	(Wales) Rhyl	A	3 – 0	Davies 31', Whitaker 71', Alessandra 82'	672
19 July 2008	Grimsby Town	A	2 – 1	Davies 31', Smalley	N/A
23 July 2008	Derby County	H	1 – 1	O'Grady 22'	1,745
29 July 2008	Hull City	H	1 – 1	Alessandra 70'	N/A
30 July 2008	Barrow	A	1 – 3	Stephens 17'	480
2 August 2008	Bradford City	A	0 – 1		N/A

=== League One ===
Oldham was at home to face Millwall for their first league game of the 2008–09 season. Oldham found themselves down within 1–3 early into the second half. After Andy Liddell scored from a penalty kick in the 74th minute, Lewis Alessandra and Chris Taylor scored twice in the final ten minutes to earn Oldham a 4–3 victory after being down by two goals. In mid-August, Oldham traveled to Elland Road to face Leeds United. Following a 0–0 halftime draw, Chris Taylor scored after a little more than five minutes following the restart. His second came in the 65th minute when he scored from a curler from 18 yards out from goal—giving Oldham 2–0 victory. Following a 2–0 victory over Leeds, Oldham was back at Boundary Park to face Cheltenham Town. Lee Hughes would give Oldham their first of the game shortly before halftime whistle. Shortly after the restart, Hughes would score his second of the game before netting his third in the 62nd minute. Danny Whitaker added Oldham's fourth of the game in the 85th minute for a 4–0 victory, sending Oldham to top of the table. After an impressive 4–0 rout of Cheltenham Town, Oldham was set to face middle-of-the-table Colchester United at Weston Homes Community Stadium. Mark Yeates gave the home side a 1–0 lead heading into the break, before grabbing his second in the 63rd minute. But in less than 60 seconds, Chris Taylor scored his 4th of the season to bring Oldham back to 2–1 down before Deane Smalley grabbed a goal shortly before full-time—giving Oldham a 2–2 draw.

Oldham dropped to second place in League One following the 2–2 draw to start September, and was again on the road as they faced Tranmere Rovers. The only goal came in the 35th minute, when Reuben Hazell headed in a goal after a cross from Neal Eardley. The game was played at a quick pace for most of the day as a total of 10 yellow cards were shown, but Oldham held out for a 1–0 win. On 13 September, Oldham was back at home to face 2007–08 League Two champions, Milton Keynes Dons. Lee Hughes didn't wait long to get the scoring started as he gave Oldham a 1–0 lead by scoring in the 8th minute. Despite seven shots on target, MK Dons could not get a goal past goalkeeper Mark Crossley before Mark Allott grabbed Oldham's second and final goal in the 95th minute. Oldham battled Hartlepool United on 20 September for their seventh league game of the season. Lee Hughes and Chris Taylor gave Oldham a solid 2–0 lead heading into the halftime break. Hartlepool battled back hard in the opening moments of the second half, scoring three times in first ten minutes of the second half with goals from Andy Monkhouse, Antony Sweeney, and Joel Porter. In the 58th minute, Taylor scored Oldham's third of the game as the two teams finished the game with a 3–3 draw. Again at home, Oldham faced off against 15th placed local rivals Huddersfield. Ian Craney scored his second in five games, giving the visitors an early 1–0 lead in the 29th minute. An Andy Liddell free kick early in the second half would be enough, as the game ended with a 1–1 draw.

The Latics began the month of October in first place, where they had remained for most of the season. Oldham played a Friday night match versus local rival Stockport County, who sat in 7th place at the time. Oldham controlled the first half of the match, as an Andy Liddell goal in the 24th minute gave them a 1–0 halftime lead. However, Stockport dominated the second half, scoring three goals en route to giving Oldham their first defeat of the season. An 82nd-minute goal from Stockport defender Michael Raynes secured the victory, as the Hatters defeated Oldham 3–1. After dropping to third place, Oldham looked to regain the top spot in the league versus Hereford United. Lee Hughes got the action started quickly, scoring his fourth goal in the fifth minute of the game. Oldham continued their early pressure against the Hereford defence, which included Hughes earning Oldham a penalty kick after he was taken down in the area by Frenchman Bruno Ngotty—with Andy Liddell converting on the penalty to give Oldham a 2–0 advantage. Wolves loaned defender Daniel Jones netted in the 36th minute for the Latics, giving the home side a 3–0 lead at the halftime break. Stephen O'Leary picked up a yellow card in the 81st minute for taking down Jones with a bad challenge, and was sent off only a minute later, forcing Hereford to play out the final minutes with only ten men. Danny Whitaker took advantage of the sending off, netting the final goal in the 90th.

Oldham played their third game of the month on 18 October against Leicester. A lackluster first half of action led to scoreless action until the 54th minute, when a Steve Howard header gave the visitors a 1–0 lead. Danny Whitaker equalised a quarter-hour later, earning a 1–1 draw as Oldham maintained an unbeaten home record. Three days later, Oldham traveled to Memorial Stadium to face Bristol Rovers. A solid attack was stifled by Rovers goalkeeper Steve Phillips, who stopped all seven shots that were on target. Rickie Lambert netted his 11th goal of the season in the 16th minute, which led the way to a Chris Lines goal in the 35th minute. Phillips and Oldham's Mark Crossley both kept out the opposition for the remainder of the match, as Oldham dropped their second consecutive away match. For their second straight away match, Oldham faced Swindon Town who sat in 18th place in League One. Oldham looked to be in control in the first 20 minutes of the match, putting pressure on Swindon's net without any success. Shortly after their barrage on the goal, defender Sean Morrison scored for Swindon. A handball in the penalty area by Lee Hughes gave Swindon the opportunity to net another in the 34th minute, which was converted by Jack Smith to double Swindon's lead. The ball was bogged down in midfielder for second half, as neither side put pressure on goal—letting Swindon wrap up their third home victory of the season. A Lewis Alessandra assured that Oldham would end October on a high note, as the striker scored his first hat trick in a 3–0 victory over Scunthorpe United. The 19-year-old led Oldham struck first in the 26th, before quickly earning his hat trick in the second half with goals in the 50th and 60th minutes. Oldham's 3–0 win over the Iron was Scunthorpe's first loss since 16 October, and helped the Latics move to 4th place in the league to end October.

After struggling through October, Oldham started November at home against Yeovil Town who was coming off consecutive scoreless draws. It appeared it could have been three consecutive scoreless matches for Yeovil when the two teams were left without goals at halftime. Aaron Brown capitalised from a deep free kick, ending his side's goal drought to give the visitors a 1–0 lead. Ex-Oldham player Paul Warne grabbed another goal for the Glovers three minutes later from hesitant play by Neal Eardley. Oldham was unable to get a ball past goalkeeper Asmir Begović, who secured a 2–0 victory for Yeovil and gave the Latics their first home loss since March 2008. After a 2–2 draw in the FA Cup, the Latics faced Northampton Town on 15 November. Oldham had several chances in the first half including a shot by Lee Hughes which was an apparent early goal, though he was flagged by the official for offsides. With a quarter of an hour left in the match, Hughes was cut down in the box to give Andy Liddell a chance to give the Latics a lead. Liddell easily converted on the spot-kick, sending Frank Fielding the wrong way. Despite the 1–0 victory, the game ended on a bad note as Hughes was sent off with his second yellow card. At Roots Hall, Southend United was just once beaten in their previous thirteen home games. James Walker tried to help him side continue the streak as he smashed the ball past Mark Crossley from point-blank range for a 1–0 Southend advantage. Chris Taylor pulled Oldham back on level terms with a 67th-minute header, before Hughes scored his seventh of the season to give Oldham a 2–1 victory. Three days later, Oldham faced off against Walsall at home. Mark Allott started the scoring early, grabbing an early 1–0 lead for Oldham from a deflected shot. Michael Ricketts, a former Oldham striker, struck back in 23rd minute with a goal before Alex Nicholls gave the visitors a 2–1 advantage. Shortly before the halftime whistle, Hughes scored his 8th goal of the season which put the two sides on level terms at the break. With the game looking like a sure draw, Hughes grabbed another goal in the 89th minute as Oldham moved up to 4th place to end November.

To begin the final month of 2008, Oldham was at home to play Brighton & Hove Albion. Oldham started the match quickly when Adam Virgo brought down Chris Taylor in the penalty box, allowing Andy Liddell to convert a spot-kick for a 1–0 Latics advantage in the 9th minute. However, Steven Thomson slid a ball past the Oldham defence to Glenn Murray who fired a shot into the roof of the net, putting the Seagulls back level at 1–1. Adam Virgo, who received a yellow card for his tackle of Taylor, received a second in the 48th minute and was sent off. Despite having only ten men, the Brighton defence frustrated the Latics, holding on for a 1–1 draw. A week later, the Latics traveled to face Peterborough United at London Road Stadium. This game was again off to a quick start, however, it was the opposition who struck first. A shot from Aaron McLean in the 12th minute deflected off Latics defender Stefan Stam, giving Peterborough a 1–0 lead. Eight minutes before the halftime break, McLean extended the lead with another goal with a rebound from a spot-kick, shortly after having another spot-kick saved by Oldham goalkeeper Greg Fleming. After several comebacks throughout the season, Oldham again showed their intentions when Lee Hughes poked the ball into the opposition's net for a 2–1 halftime lead for Peterborough. Just before the hour mark, Hughes again scored when he put a loose ball into the net. With several more chances for both sides, the game ended with a 2–2 draw.

After two consecutive draws, Oldham was set to face Leyton Orient. Despite early efforts from Danny Whitaker and Darren Byfield, Oldham was unable to net an early goal. A Leyton Orient goal looked possible when Adam Chambers got a rebound twelve yards out, but the midfielder sent the ball high over the net. After Byfield was pulled down in the penalty area by Tamika Mkandawire, Andy Liddell struck his 8th goal of the season via a penalty kick for a 1–0 halftime advantage. Near the midway point of the second half, Greg Fleming gave Orient a chance to get back on level terms when he fouled Ryan Jarvis in the box. Fleming saved the penalty, but Jason Demetriou scored from a rebound, earning Leyton Orient a 1–1 draw—Oldham's third consecutive. Oldham was away to face Crewe Alexandra under new manager Gudjon Thordarson on Boxing Day. Despite struggling with an illness just days before the match, Darren Byfield was named to the starting lineup. Just before the hour mark in the match, Byfield scored his first for the club from a through back from Kelvin Lomax. The win was secured when Lee Hughes curled a ball past Stuart Tomlinson, before Hughes grabbed another five minutes before the final whistle for a 3–0 win. Two days after the Boxing Day victory, Oldham faced off against Carlisle United for the final match of 2008. Terrific play from Carlisle goalkeeper Tim Krul kept Oldham out of goal, despite giving the Latics nineteen corners. Neither side had an attacking threat until 17 minutes in when a Reuben Hazell header forced Krul into a saved shot. With nineteen total shots for the Latics, manager John Sheridan was surprised when the game ended in a scoreless draw.

Win	Draw	Loss

Date	Opponent	Venue	Result	Scorers	Attendance	League position
9 August 2008	Millwall	H	4 – 3	Liddell (2) 3', 74' (pen.), Alessandra 80', Taylor 85'	5,367	5th
16 August 2008	Leeds United	A	2 – 0	Taylor (2) 51', 65'	24,631	2nd
23 August 2008	Cheltenham Town	H	4 – 0	Hughes (3) 45', 50', 62', Whitaker 85'	4,673	1st
30 August 2008	Colchester United	A	2 – 2	Taylor 64', Smalley 88'	4,708	2nd
6 September 2008	Tranmere	A	1 – 0	Hazell 35'	6,802	1st
13 September 2008	MK Dons	H	2 – 0	Hughes 8', Allott 95'	5,530	1st
20 September 2008	Hartlepool United	A	3 – 3	Hughes 23', Taylor (2) 44', 58'	4,507	1st
27 September 2008	Huddersfield Town	H	1 – 1	Allott 50'	7,418	1st
3 October 2008	Stockport County	A	1 – 3	Liddell 24'	8,360	3rd
12 October 2008	Hereford United	H	4 – 0	Hughes 4', Liddell 15' (pen.), Jones 36', Whitaker 90'	5,468	3rd
18 October 2008	Leicester City	H	1 – 1	Whitaker 69'	8,901	4th
21 October 2008	Bristol Rovers	A	0 – 2		6,379	5th
25 October 2008	Swindon Town	A	0 – 2		6,756	7th
28 October 2008	Scunthorpe United	H	3 – 0	Alessandra (3) 26', 50', 60'	6,057	4th
1 November 2008	Yeovil Town	H	0 – 2		5,318	7th
15 November 2008	Northampton Town	A	1 – 0	Liddell 76' (pen.)	5,067	7th
22 November 2008	Southend United	A	2 – 1	Taylor 67', Hughes 71'	7,041	7th
25 November 2008	Walsall	H	3 – 2	Allott 15', Hughes (2) 38', 89'	3,936	4th
6 December 2008	Brighton	H	1 – 1	Liddell 9' (pen.)	4,803	6th
13 December 2008	Peterborough United	A	2 – 2	Hughes (2) 40', 59'	6,219	6th
20 December 2008	Leyton Orient	H	1 – 1	Liddell 32' (pen.)	6,839	6th
26 December 2008	Crewe Alexandra	A	3 – 0	Byfield 57', Hughes (2) 68', 85'	5,780	5th
28 December 2008	Carlisle United	H	0 – 0		6,254	5th
3 January 2009	Huddersfield Town	A	1 – 1	Liddell 6'	16,950	5th
12 January 2009	Hartlepool United	H	2 – 1	Hughes 21', Smalley 52'	4,211	3rd
17 January 2009	Hereford United	A	0 – 5		3,342	5th
24 January 2009	Stockport County	H	3 – 1	Whitaker 3', Hughes 18', Taylor 55'	7,605	3rd
27 January 2009	Scunthorpe United	A	0 – 2		4,447	6th
31 January 2009	Swindon Town	H	0 – 0		4,712	6th
7 February 2009	Leicester City	A	0 – 0		22,328	5th
14 February 2009	Northampton Town	H	2 – 1	Hazell 8', Windass 60'	4,629	5th
21 February 2009	Yeovil Town	A	2 – 2	Smalley 12', Forbes 39' (o.g.)	4,130	4th
24 February 2009	Bristol Rovers	H	0 – 2		3,745	5th
28 February 2009	Millwall	A	3 – 2	Smalley 5', Hughes 10', Taylor 90+2'	8,551	4th
2 March 2009	Leeds United	H	1 – 1	Hughes 51'	7,835	4th
7 March 2009	Colchester United	H	0 – 1		4,591	5th
14 March 2009	Milton Keynes Dons	A	2 – 6	Maher 4', Hughes 40'	10,621	8th
21 March 2009	Tranmere Rovers	H	0 – 2		7,489	8th
24 March 2009	Cheltenham Town	A	1 – 1	Whitaker 90+4'	2,992	8th
28 March 2009	Leyton Orient	A	1 – 2	Whitaker 34'	4,034	9th
4 April 2009	Peterborough	H	1 – 2	Taylor 43'	5,083	9th
11 April 2009	Carlisle United	A	1 – 1	Eardley 89'	6,635	10th
13 April 2009	Crewe Alexandra	H	1 – 1	Hazell 41'	4,334	10th
18 April 2009	Brighton & Hove Albion	A	1 – 3	Alessandra 62'	6,618	10th
25 April 2009	Southend United	H	1 – 1	Eardley 51' (pen.)	4,830	10th
2 May 2009	Walsall	A	2 – 1	Smalley 44', Brooke 74'	4,807	10th

Pos	Team	Pld	W	D	L	GF	GA	GD	Pts
8	Southend United	46	21	8	17	58	61	−3	71
9	Huddersfield Town	46	18	14	14	62	65	−3	68
10	Oldham Athletic	46	16	17	13	66	65	+1	65
11	Bristol Rovers	46	17	12	17	79	61	+18	63
12	Colchester United	46	18	9	19	58	58	0	63

Updated to match(es) played on 2 May 2009. Source: The Football League
Rules for classification: 1) points; 2) goal difference; 3) number of goals scored.

=== FA Cup ===
In the first round of the 2008–09 FA Cup, Oldham was paired against League One side Cheltenham Town. Five minutes into the opening half, Scott Murray for Cheltenham opened the scoring with a strike, getting past goalkeeper Mark Crossley. The Robins gained a 2–0 halftime advantage when Lloyd Owusu earned and converted a penalty kick, getting it past the fingertips of Crossley. The Latics got a goal back when Chris Taylor's free kick was deflected by Cheltenham goalkeeper Shane Higgs, with the rebound falling immediately back to Taylor. In the 76th minute, Danny Whitaker equalised the game at 2–2 when a deflected shot crept into the corner of the net. A late robins shot from substitute Damian Spencer hit the post at the end of the match, but Oldham held on for a draw—forcing a replay at Boundary Park. In the replay, an early 22nd minute shot from Lewis Montrose proved enough for Cheltenham to advance to the second round, and knock out Oldham for the fourth time in FA Cup history. Despite 17 shots to Cheltenham's three, Oldham could not muster a goal against Scott Brown. Shortly before the halftime break, Oldham was dealt a blow when Deane Smalley picked up an injury—giving Matthew Wolfenden his first senior appearance of the season. Shortly before the final whistle, Kieran Lee almost equalised with a diving header, but the ball rolled past the far post.

Win	Draw	Loss

Date	Round	Opponent	Venue	Result	Scorers	Attendance
8 November 2008	First Round	Cheltenham Town	A	2 – 2	Taylor 49', Whitaker 79'	2,585
17 November 2008	First Round; Replay	Cheltanham Town	H	0 – 1		2,552

=== Carling Cup ===
Oldham's 2008–09 Carling Cup campaign began at near neighbours Rochdale. Craig Davies picked up his first red card of the season in the 45th minute following a clash with Nathan Stanton. Though Rochdale had a one-man advantage for the second half, the game was still level at 0–0 following regular time and extra time. Neal Eardley, Chris Taylor, and Danny Whitaker converted on penalties to put Oldham up 3–1 before Lee Hughes scored the fourth to give Oldham the victory over Rochdale. For their second game, the Latics were once again away—this time to Burnley at Turf Moor, and Greg Fleming made his debut for the club in goal. The visitors found themselves down 1–0 early to Burnley after a Chris McCann goal in the 12th minute. After just over an hour played, Martin Paterson extended Burnley's lead to 2–0, before getting another in the 79th to secure a 3–0 victory.

Win	Draw	Loss

Date	Round	Opponent	Venue	Result	Scorers	Attendance
12 August 2008	First Round	Rochdale	A	0 – 0 (4 – 1 p)		5,786
26 August 2008	Second Round	Burnley	A	0 – 3		5,528

=== Johnstone's Paint Trophy ===
Oldham faced League Two side Morecambe in the first round of the 2008–09 Johnstone's Paint Trophy. Though both sides had numerous chances to take the lead in the first half, the two sides were scoreless at the halftime break. A little over ten minutes after the restart, Danny Whitaker gave Oldham a 1–0 lead in the 56th minute before Stewart Drummond equalised for Morecambe in the 65th. The two teams ended regular time level at 1–1, and after neither side could get a winning goal, they went into a penalty shootout. Following Lewis Alessandra's miss in "sudden death", Andy Parrish sent Oldham goalkeeper Greg Fleming the wrong way to give Morcambe a victory.

Win	Draw	Loss

Date	Round	Opponent	Venue	Result	Scorers	Attendance
2 September 2008	First Round	Morecambe	H	1 – 1 (4 – 5 p)	Whitaker 56'	2,016

== Squad statistics ==
No.	Pos.	Name	League		FA Cup		Carling Cup		FL Trophy		Total		Discipline	
No.	Pos.	Name	Apps	Goals	Apps	Goals	Apps	Goals	Apps	Goals	Apps	Goals	Yellow card	Red card
1	GK	(Wales) Mark Crossley	21	0	2	0	1	0	0	0	24	0	0	0
2	DF	(Wales) Neal Eardley	31(3)	2	0	0	2	0	1	0	34(3)	2	6	0
3	DF	(Republic of Ireland) Richie Byrne	3(1)	0	0	0	0	0	0	0	3(1)	0	0	0
3	DF	(Republic of Ireland) Scott Golbourne	7(1)	0	0	0	0	0	0	0	7(1)	0	0	0
4	MF	(Democratic Republic of the Congo) Jean-Paul Kalala	0	0	0	0	0	0	0	0	0	0	0	0
4	MF	(England) Jon Worthington	0	0	0	0	0	0	0	0	0	0	0	0
5	DF	(Republic of Ireland) John Thompson	0	0	0	0	0	0	0	0	0	0	0	0
5	FW	(England) Dean Windass	8(2)	1	0	0	0	0	0	0	8(2)	1	2	0
6	DF	(Netherlands) Stefan Stam	11(2)	0	2	0	1(1)	0	1	0	15(3)	0	1	1
7	MF	(England) Danny Whitaker	30(9)	5	1	1	2	0	1	1	34(9)	8	3	0
8	MF	(England) Mark Allott	44(1)	3	2	0	2	0	1	0	49(1)	3	8	0
9	FW	(England) Lee Hughes	37(1)	18	0	0	1(1)	0	1	0	38(2)	18	9	1
10	FW	(Wales) Craig Davies	6(6)	0	0	0	1	0	1	0	8(6)	0	1	1
10	FW	(England) Steve Kabba	7(1)	0	0	0	0	0	0	0	7(1)	0	0	0
11	FW	(England) Chris O'Grady	3(10)	0	0	0	2	0	0(1)	0	5(11)	0	2	0
12	DF	(England) Kelvin Lomax	27	0	2	0	1	0	1	0	31	0	3	0
13	GK	(Scotland) Greg Fleming	15(1)	0	0	0	1	0	1	0	18(1)	0	1	1
14	DF	(England) Reuben Hazell	41	1	2	0	2	0	1	0	45	1	11	0
15	MF	(Republic of Ireland) Kevin Maher	21(7)	1	1(1)	0	1	0	1	0	24(8)	1	1	0
16	MF	(England) Sean Gregan (c)	37(2)	0	2	0	1	0	0	0	40(2)	0	6	1
17	FW	(England) Matthew Wolfenden	1(4)	0	0(1)	0	0	0	0	0	1(5)	0	1	0
18	DF	(England) Chris Taylor	42	10	2	1	2	0	0	0	46	11	7	0
19	MF	(England) Kieran Lee	6(1)	0	0(1)	0	0(1)	0	0(1)	0	6(4)	0	0	0
20	MF	(England) Dale Stephens	0	0	0	0	0	0	0	0	0	0	0	0
21	DF	(England) Daniel Jones	23	1	2	0	0	0	0	0	25	1	1	1
22	MF	(Scotland) Andy Liddell	18(14)	8	0(1)	0	0(1)	0	0	0	18(16)	8	1	0
23	FW	(Jamaica) Darren Byfield	8	1	0	0	0	0	0	0	8	1	2	0
23	DF	(England) Seb Hines	4	0	0	0	0	0	0	0	4	0	0	0
23	GK	(Republic of Ireland) Shane Supple	5	0	0	0	0	0	0	0	5	0	0	0
24	FW	(England) Deane Smalley	22(12)	4	2	0	2	0	1	0	27(12)	5	2	0
25	FW	(England) Lewis Alessandra	12(20)	5	2	0	0(2)	0	0(1)	0	14(23)	5	0	0
26	GK	(England) Josh Bell	0	0	0	0	0	0	0	0	0	0	0	0
27	DF	(England) Paul Black	2(1)	0	0	0	0	0	0	0	2(1)	0	0	0
28	FW	(England) Brett Ormerod	2(3)	0	0	0	0	0	0	0	2(3)	0	1	0
28	DF	(Denmark) Jan Budtz	3	0	0	0	0	0	0	0	3	0	0	0
29	MF	(Portugal) Fabio Ferreira	0(1)	0	0	0	0	0	0	0	0(1)	0	0	0
32	FW	(England) Ryan Brooke	0(1)	1	0	0	0	0	0	0	0(1)	1	0	0
33	MF	(England) Ian Westlake	5	0	0	0	0	0	0	0	5	0	1	0
39	FW	(England) David Williams	0	0	0	0	0	0	0	0	0	0	0	0
42	MF	(England) Aaron Chalmers	0	0	0	0	0	0	0	0	0	0	0	0
–	MF	(Wales) Joe Jacobson	0	0	0	0	0	0	0	0	0	0	0	0
–	MF	(England) Rob Purdie	0	0	0	0	0	0	0	0	0	0	0	0

== Transfers ==
=== In ===
Date	Pos.	Name	From	Fee
2008-07-10	FW	David Williams	Unattached	Free
2008-07-23	MF	Kevin Maher	Unattached	Free
2008-10-06	DF	Richie Byrne	Aberdeen	Free
2009-05-22	MF	Rob Purdie	Darlington	Free
2009-05-26	MF	Jon Worthington	Huddersfield Town	Free
2009-06-18	DF	Joe Jacobson	Bristol Rovers	Free
2009-06-25	DF	Sean Gregan	Unattached	Free
2009-06-26	FW	Paweł Abbott	Darlington	Free

=== Out ===
Date	Pos.	Name	To	Fee
2008-12-02	MF	Aaron Chalmers	Released	
2008-11-06	DF	Richie Byrne	Released	
2009-01-05	MF	John Thompson	Released	
2009-01-30	FW	David Williams	Released	
2009-02-02	FW	Craig Davies	Brighton & Hove Albion	Undisclosed
2009-04-07	MF	Andy Liddell	Released	
2009-05-12	DF	Sean Gregan	Released	
2009-05-13	DF	Jean-Paul Kalala	Released	
2009-05-13	FW	Lee Hughes	Released	
2009-05-13	MF	Kevin Maher	Released	
2009-05-14	DF	Stefan Stam	Released	

=== Loan in ===
Date From	Date To	Pos	Name	Loaned from
2008-10-02	2009-01-03	DF	Daniel Jones	Wolverhampton
2008-10-16	2008-11-16	FW	Brett Ormerod	Preston North End
2008-11-14	2009-01-10	FW	Darren Byfield	Doncaster
2009-01-10	2009-03-16	FW	Dean Windass	Hull City
2009-01-19	2009-03-24	DF	Scott Golbourne	Reading
2009-02-02	End of 2008–09 season	DF	Daniel Jones	Wolverhampton
2009-02-12	2009-03-16	DF	Seb Hines	Middlesbrough
2009-02-14	2009-03-16	GK	Jan Budtz	Hartlepool United
2009-02-20	2009-04-23	FW	Fabio Ferreira	Chelsea
2009-02-26	2009-04-16	FW	Steve Kabba	Watford
2009-03-18	2009-04-18	GK	Shane Supple	Ipswich Town
2009-03-19	End of 2008–09 season	MF	Ian Westlake	Cheltenham Town

=== Loan out ===
Date From	Date To	Pos	Name	Loaned to
2008-08-22	2009-01-05	DF	Paul Black	Barrow
2008-10-17	2008-11-17	FW	Chris O'Grady	Bury
2008-10-17	2009-01-03	DF	John Thompson	Notts County
2008-10-30	End of 2008–09 season	MF	Jean-Paul Kalala	Grimsby Town
2008-11-01	2008-12-30	FW	Craig Davies	Stockport County
2009-01-02	2009-02-03	FW	Chris O'Grady	Bradford City
2009-02-02	End of 2008–09 season	FW	Chris O'Grady	Stockport County
2009-03-26	End of 2008–09 season	FW	Lee Hughes	Blackpool

== Awards ==
=== League One Team of the Week ===
The following Oldham Athletic players have appeared on the official Football League One team of the week.

- 18 August 2008: Chris Taylor, Reuben Hazell
- 26 August 2008: Lee Hughes
- 16 September 2008: Mark Crossley
- 6 October 2008: Chris Taylor
- 13 October 2008: Andy Liddell
- 20 October 2008: Sean Gregan
- 17 November 2008: Chris Taylor, Kelvin Lomax
- 29 December 2008: Lee Hughes
- 26 January 2009: Chris Taylor
- 9 February 2009: Sean Gregan, Dean Windass
- 2 March 2009: Deane Smalley

=== League One Team of the Year ===
The following Oldham Athletic players were named to the PFA Team of the Year for Football League One.

- Neal Eardley, Chris Taylor

=== Internal awards ===
Each season, the club allows fans to vote on several awards, including Oldham's Player of the Year and the Colin Shaw Memorial Trophy, which goes to the Young Player of the Year.

- Fans' Player of the Year: Reuben Hazell
- Colin Shaw Memorial Trophy: Deane Smalley
- Goal of the Season: Mark Allott v Huddersfield Town, 1–1, 3 January 2009
