= Ryan Brooke =

English footballer (born 1990)

Personal information
- Full name: Ryan Michael Brooke
- Date of birth: 4 October 1990 (age 36)
- Place of birth: Holmes Chapel, England
- Height: 6 ft 1 in (1.85 m)
- Position: Forward

Team information
- Current team: Trafford

Youth career
- ?–2009: Oldham Athletic

Senior career*
Years	Team	Apps	(Gls)
2009–2012	Oldham Athletic	29	(2)
2011	→ Barrow (loan)	6	(0)
2012	→ AFC Telford United (loan)	11	(2)
2012–2013	Altrincham	22	(6)
2013–2016	Curzon Ashton		
2016–2017	Nantwich Town		
2017–2019	Curzon Ashton		
2019–2020	Mossley		
2020–2026	Runcorn Linnets		
2026–	Trafford		

Managerial career
- 2025–2025: Runcorn Linnets (co-caretaker)
- * Club domestic league appearances and goals

Ryan Michael Brooke (born 4 October 1990) is an English footballer who plays as a forward for North West Counties League Premier Division club Trafford.

== Career ==
On 2 May 2009, Brooke was handed his league debut against Walsall in Oldham's final game of the 2008–09 season. After being named as a substitute, he came on in the 71st minute for Danny Whitaker. In the 74th minute, he scored with his first touch of the ball, the winning goal in the 2–1 victory. He studied at the same school in Holmes Chapel as Seth Johnson and Dean Ashton.

In September 2011 he joined Barrow on a months loan, and played in 6 League games. However Oldham manager Paul Dickov informed Brooke that he still had a future at the club.

On the January transfer window deadline day of 2012, Brooke signed for Conference Premier side AFC Telford United on a one-month loan deal.

He was released by Oldham at the end of the 2011–12 season, along with eight other players.

He joined Altrincham in May 2012. He scored his first goal for Altrincham, a penalty, in a 6–0 win over Hinckley United.

In August 2016 he signed for Nantwich Town and scored on his debut for the club the following day.

In March 2026, Brooke scored his 77th goal for Runcorn Linnets to become the club's all time record goal scorer.

In May 2026, having extended his tally with Runcorn Linnets to 83 goals, he departed the club to join Trafford.

== Career statistics ==
As of match played 26 December 2017

Appearances and goals by club, season and competition
Club	Season	League			FA Cup		League Cup		Other		Total	
Club	Season	Division	Apps	Goals	Apps	Goals	Apps	Goals	Apps	Goals	Apps	Goals
Oldham Athletic	2008–09	League One	1	1	0	0	0	0	0	0	1	1
Oldham Athletic	2009–10	League One	15	1	1	0	0	0	1 (Note: Appearance in the Football League Trophy)	0	17	1
Oldham Athletic	2010–11	League One	13	0	0	0	0	0	0	0	13	0
Oldham Athletic	2011–12	League One	0	0	0	0	0	0	0	0	0	0
Oldham Athletic	Oldham total		29	2	1	0	0	0	1	0	31	2
Barrow (loan)	2011–12	Conference Premier	6	0	0	0	—		0	0	6	0
Telford United (loan)	2011–12	Conference Premier	11	2	0	0	—		0	0	11	2
Altrincham	2012–13	Conference North	30	6	2	0	—		1 (Note: Appearances in the FA Trophy)	0	33	6
Curzon Ashton	2013–14	NPL – Division One North					—		1	0	1	0
Curzon Ashton	2014–15	NPL – Premier Division					—					
Curzon Ashton	2015–16	National League North	32	8	0	0	—		2	0	34	8
Curzon Ashton	2016–17	National League North	4	1	0	0	—		0	0	4	1
Curzon Ashton	Curzon Ashton total		36	9	0	0	0	0	3	0	39	9
Nantwich Town	2016–17	NPL – Premier Division			1	0	—		1	0	2	0
Nantwich Town	2017–18	NPL – Premier Division					—					
Curzon Ashton	2017–18	National League North	3	1	0	0	—		0	0	3	1
Career total			115	20	4	0	0	0	6	0	125	20
