= Lewis Alessandra =

English footballer (born 1989)

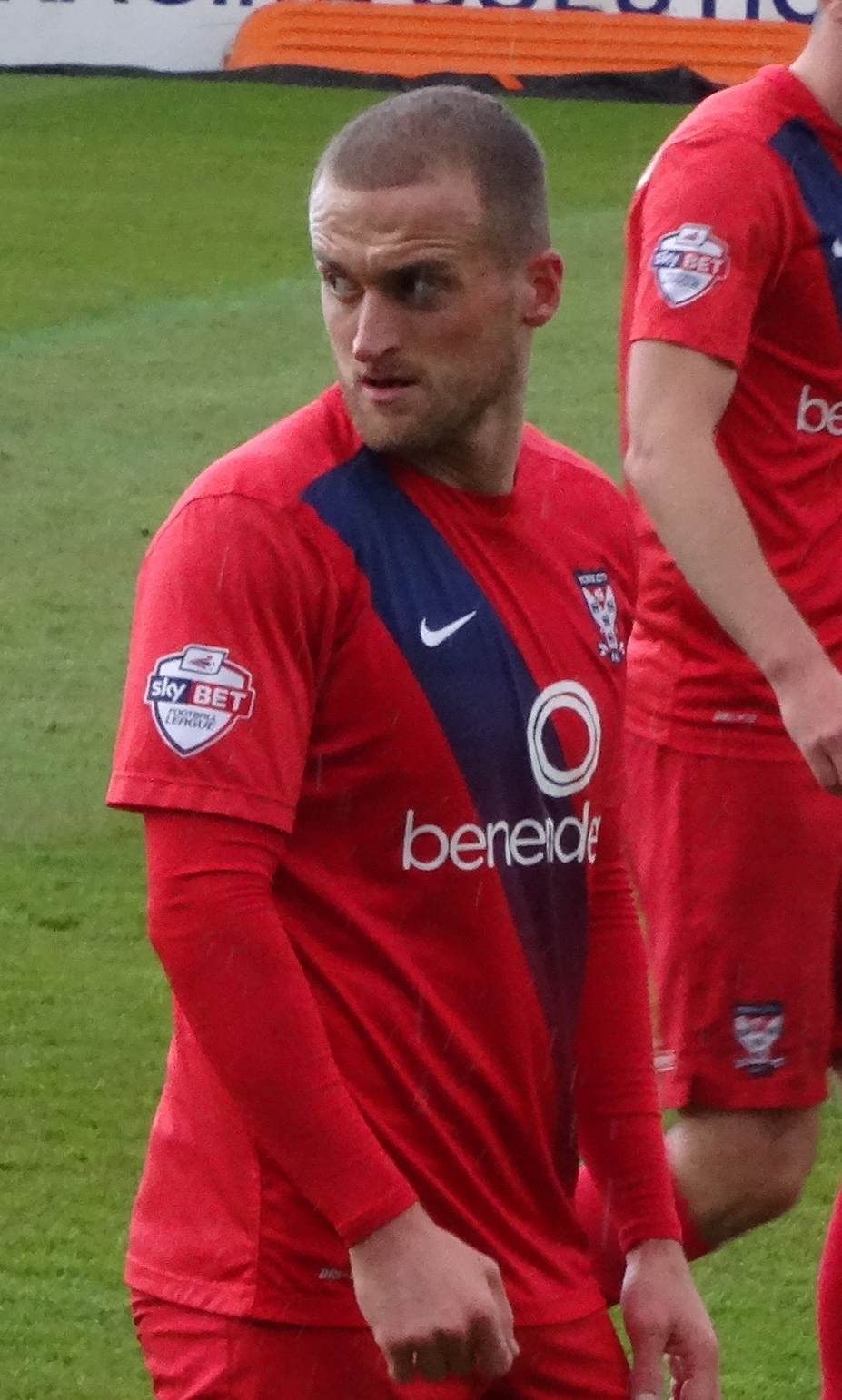
- Alessandra with York City in 2016

Personal information
- Full name: Lewis Peter Alessandra
- Date of birth: 8 February 1989 (age 37)
- Place of birth: Heywood, England
- Height: 5 ft 10 in (1.78 m)
- Positions: Striker; winger

Youth career
- Roach Dynamos
- –2007: Oldham Athletic

Senior career*
Years	Team	Apps	(Gls)
2007–2011	Oldham Athletic	67	(8)
2009	→ Chester City (loan)	0	(0)
2011–2013	Morecambe	82	(7)
2013–2015	Plymouth Argyle	86	(18)
2015–2016	Rochdale	8	(1)
2016	→ York City (loan)	11	(2)
2016–2017	Hartlepool United	46	(9)
2017–2019	Notts County	65	(9)
2019–2020	Morecambe	22	(5)
2020–2022	Carlisle United	79	(11)
2022–2023	South Shields	35	(6)
2023–2024	Hyde United	37	(12)
2024	Bury	19	(1)
Total		496	(81)
- * Club domestic league appearances and goals

Lewis Peter Alessandra (born 8 February 1989) is an English former professional footballer who played as a striker or winger.

He has played in the English Football League for Oldham Athletic, Morecambe, Plymouth Argyle, Rochdale, York City, Hartlepool United and Notts County and Carlisle United. The last full-team that Alessandra played for was South Shields who at the time were in the Northern Premier League. After leaving Shields, he played semi-professionally for Hyde United.

== Career ==
=== Oldham Athletic ===
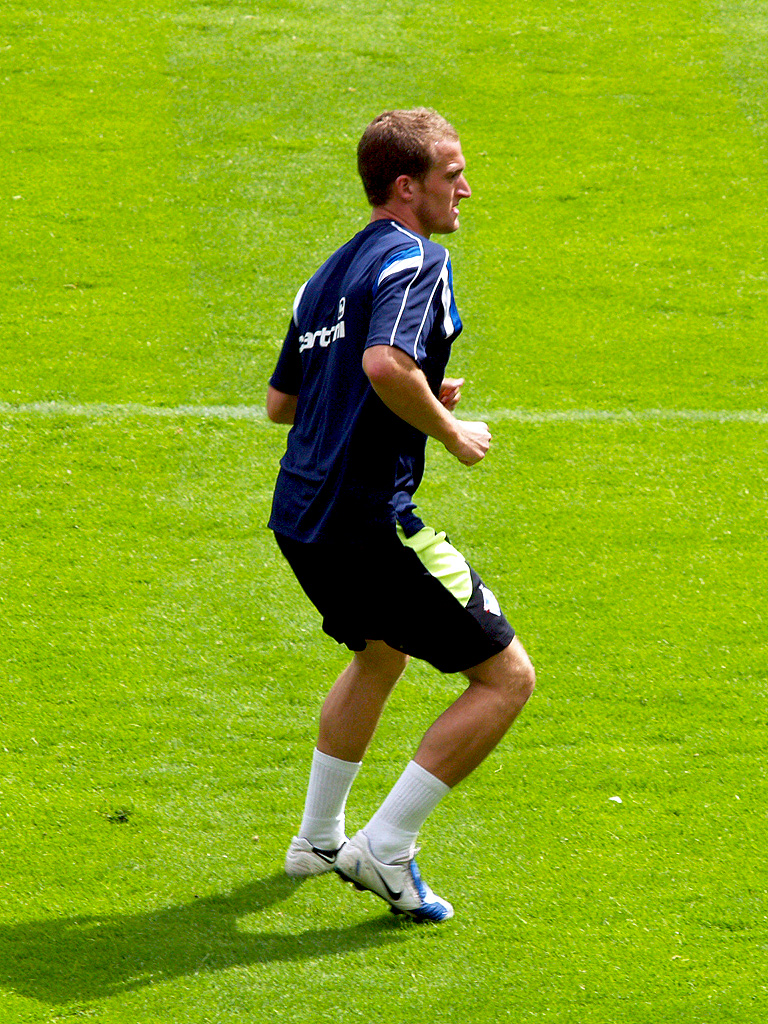
Alessandra training with Oldham Athletic in 2009

Alessandra was born in Heywood, Greater Manchester. Along with his teammate Deane Smalley, Alessandra graduated from Oldham Athletic's youth system. He was a regular in the reserve squad, receiving a contract extension in the summer of 2008. The club awarded the youngster a three-year contract.

On 20 October 2007, Alessandra made his first-team debut in a 1–1 draw versus Huddersfield Town, with his first start coming on 2 February 2008 in a loss to Swansea City. His first goal with the senior squad came at Boundary Park in a 3–1 win over Tranmere Rovers on 8 March 2008. On 26 April 2008, Alessandra scored his second league goal in the 87th minute versus Cheltenham Town, giving Oldham a 2–1 win.

In Oldham's first match of the 2008–09 season, Alessandra scored Oldham's third goal in a 4–3 victory over Millwall. He scored his first senior hat-trick on 28 October, in a 3–0 victory over Scunthorpe United.

At the beginning of the 2010–11 season, Alessandra was converted to a wide player for upcoming season by the new manager enabling him to play up front or on either wing. At the end of the campaign his contract expired and he was informed that he would not be offered a new one.

=== Chester City (loan) ===
On 31 July 2009, it was reported that Alessandra was set to join Conference Premier club Chester City on loan. The move was done with the idea of giving the player more time playing and he commented himself that "if he was not getting games with Latics, he might as well go on loan to Chester." The move was initially a trial until the club was able to sign players again. Alessandra scored in a trial match for the club against a Burnley XI and scored his second goal in two matches with an early effort against Droylsden.

After briefly returning to Oldham, Chester confirmed they had signed Alessandra on an initial one-month loan on 21 August. The following day, he made his debut in a scoreless draw versus Luton Town, playing more than 90 minutes before he was substituted for defender Kristian Platt. He made four appearances for Chester but after club was expelled from the Football Conference their record was expunged.

=== Morecambe ===
Alessandra signed for League Two club Morecambe on 23 June 2011. In two years with the club, he made 82 league appearances and scored nine goals playing in a number of different positions. He was offered a new contract at the end of the 2012–13 season and agreed to sign it but then decided against it and joined Plymouth Argyle.

=== Plymouth Argyle ===
Alessandra signed a two-year contract with Plymouth Argyle in June 2013. "I know Lewis very well, and his strengths as a striker," said Argyle manager John Sheridan, who gave him his first team debut at Oldham in 2007. "Lewis can play on the right and left of the front line as well as down the middle." Alessandra made his debut in the club's first match of the new season at Southend United, and scored two goals in a League Cup match at Birmingham City three days later. Alessandra scored his first league goal for Argyle against Northampton Town in November. In total Alessandra scored 12 goals in 49 matches in all competitions in his first season with the Pilgrims.

In November 2014, be scored his 18th goal in Argyle colours, scoring in a 3–0 win against Portsmouth. This rose Argyle up to 4th in the table, just off the automatic promotion spots. Alessandra's initial role at Plymouth was to be used as a right midfielder, where he spent the duration of the first half of the Pilgrims' 2013–14 season. Sheridan later saw the Midfielder's attacking attributes and decided to play him as a striker, alongside Reuben Reid. Alessandra ended the season with 12 goals in 49 matches, with Plymouth finishing 10th in League Two. Alessandra scored 13 goals in 51 matches the following season as his team qualified for the League 2 play-offs, but were defeated by Wycombe Wanderers in the semi-final.

=== Rochdale and Hartlepool United ===
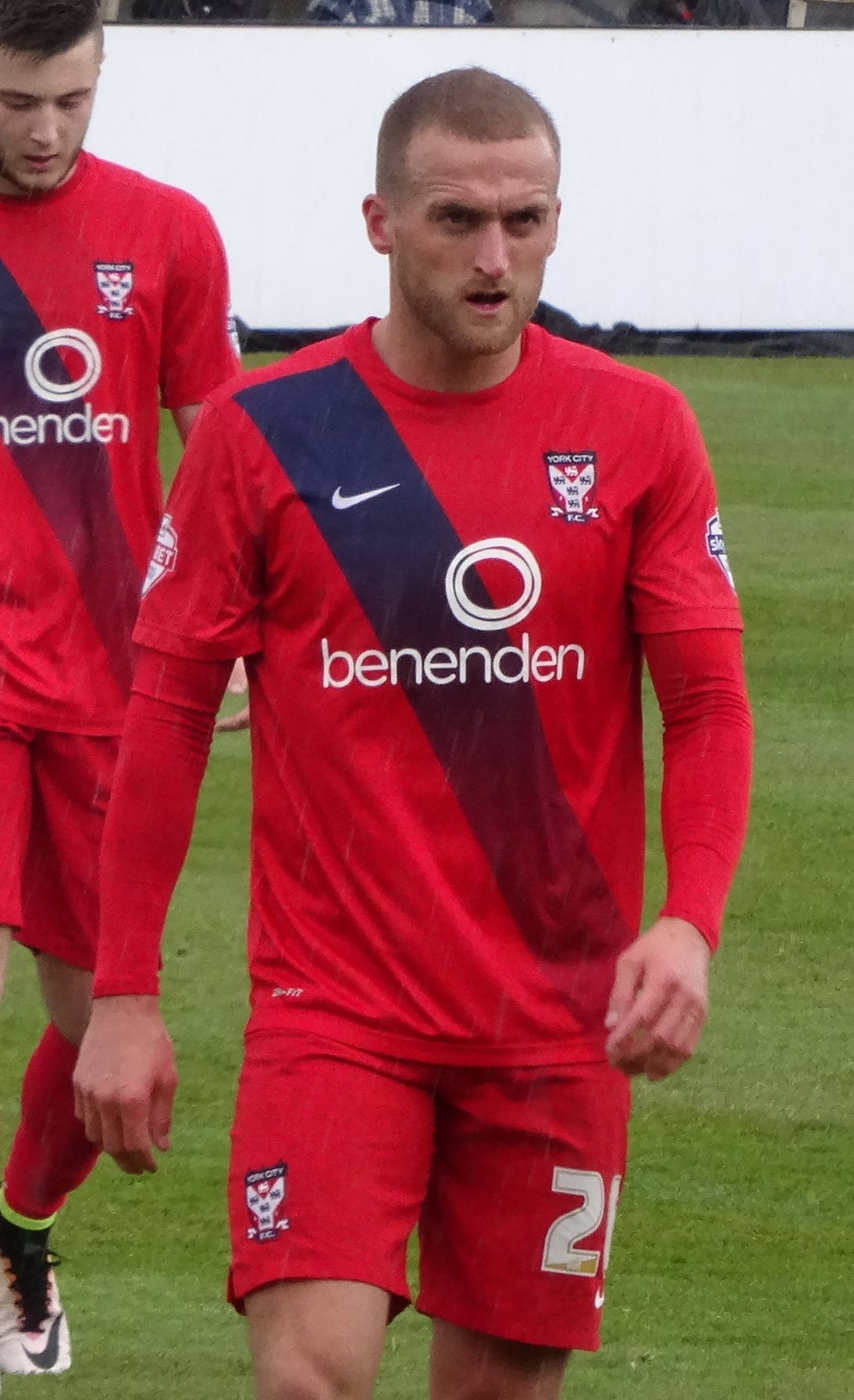
Alessandra playing for York City in 2016

On 8 June 2015, Alessandra signed a two-year contract with League One club Rochdale. Having had limited chances at Rochdale, he joined League Two club York City on 8 March 2016 on a one-month emergency loan. He scored in the 20th minute of his debut in a 1–1 home draw with Barnet on 12 March 2016.

On 29 June 2016, Alessandra signed for League Two club Hartlepool United on undisclosed terms, after having his contract with Rochdale cancelled by mutual consent.

=== Notts County and return to Morecambe ===
On 26 May 2017, Alessandra signed for League Two club Notts County on a two-year contract for an undisclosed fee. He was released by Notts County at the end of the 2018–19 season.

Alessandra re-signed for League Two club Morecambe on 25 July 2019 on a contract of undisclosed length.

=== Carlisle United ===
On 24 January 2020, Alessandra signed a short-term contract with Carlisle United until the end of the 2019–20 season. He scored his first goal for Carlisle in a 2–1 win against Cambridge United on 29 February 2020. Alessandra was released by the club at the end of the 2021–22.

=== South Shields ===
On 5 August 2022, Alessandra dropped out of the Football League for the first time when he signed for Northern Premier League side South Shields. Shields manager Kevin Phillips said of Alessandra's signing "He is someone who has only ever played league football, so to attract a player of his calibre is a massive coup. He brings brilliant pedigree, experience and leadership qualities, and fits well with the players we have signed this summer and those who were already here." He scored his first goal for the club on 6 September 2022 in a 2–1 win against Guiseley. On 17 September 2022, Alessandra scored a hat-trick in a 5–0 win against Shildon in the FA Cup second qualifying round. He was released by Shields at the end of the 2022–23 season.

=== Hyde United ===
On 24 June 2023, it was announced he had signed for Northern Premier League side Hyde United.

=== Bury ===
In August 2024, he signed for Bury. Upon signing Bury manager Dave McNabb said "Lewis Alessandra is a player who I'm sure many of the fans will be familiar with having spent much of his career in the football league. Lewis has had an unbelievable career and will add some much needed experience to the squad."

On 30 November 2024, Alessandra announced his retirement due to recurring injuries and ongoing work commitments.

== Career statistics ==
Appearances and goals by club, season and competition
Club	Season	League			FA Cup		League Cup		Other		Total	
Club	Season	Division	Apps	Goals	Apps	Goals	Apps	Goals	Apps	Goals	Apps	Goals
Oldham Athletic	2007–08	League One	15	2	1	0	0	0	0	0	16	2
Oldham Athletic	2008–09	League One	32	5	2	0	2	0	1 (Note: Appearance(s) in Football League Trophy)	0	37	5
Oldham Athletic	2009–10	League One	1	0	0	0	1	0	0	0	2	0
Oldham Athletic	2010–11	League One	19	1	1	0	1	0	0	0	21	1
Oldham Athletic	Total		67	8	4	0	4	0	1	0	76	8
Morecambe	2011–12	League Two	42	4	1	0	2	0	1	0	46	4
Morecambe	2012–13	League Two	40	3	3	0	2	1	2	0	47	4
Morecambe	Total		82	7	4	0	4	1	3	0	93	8
Plymouth Argyle	2013–14	League Two	42	7	5	2	1	2	1	1	49	12
Plymouth Argyle	2014–15	League Two	44	11	2	0	1	0	4 (Note: Two appearances and two goals in Football League Trophy, two appearances in League Two play-offs)	2	51	13
Plymouth Argyle	Total		86	18	7	2	2	2	5	3	100	25
Rochdale	2015–16	League One	8	1	0	0	1	0	2	1	11	2
York City (loan)	2015–16	League Two	11	2	—		—		—		11	2
Hartlepool United	2016–17	League Two	46	9	2	0	1	0	1 (Note: Appearance(s) in EFL Trophy)	0	50	9
Notts County	2017–18	League Two	39	7	4	0	0	0	5 (Note: Three appearances in EFL Trophy, two in League Two play-offs)	0	48	7
Notts County	2018–19	League Two	26	2	1	0	1	0	1	1	29	3
Notts County	Total		65	9	5	0	1	0	6	1	77	10
Morecambe	2019–20	League Two	22	5	1	0	2	0	1	0	26	5
Carlisle United	2019–20	League Two	10	1	—		—		—		10	1
Carlisle United	2020–21	League Two	45	8	2	0	1	0	2	1	50	9
Carlisle United	2021–22	League Two	24	2	1	0	1	0	1	0	27	2
Carlisle United	Total		79	11	3	0	2	0	3	1	87	12
South Shields	2022–23	NPL Premier Division	35	6	4	3	0	0	1	1	40	10
Hyde United	2023–24	NPL Premier Division	36	12	2	0	0	0	4	1	42	13
Bury	2024–25	North West Counties Football League Premier Division	19	1	5	2	0	0	1	0	25	3
Career total			496	81	34	7	16	3	25	7	571	98

== Honours ==
South Shields

- Northern Premier League: 2022–23
