= Dale Stephens (footballer) =

English footballer (born 1989)

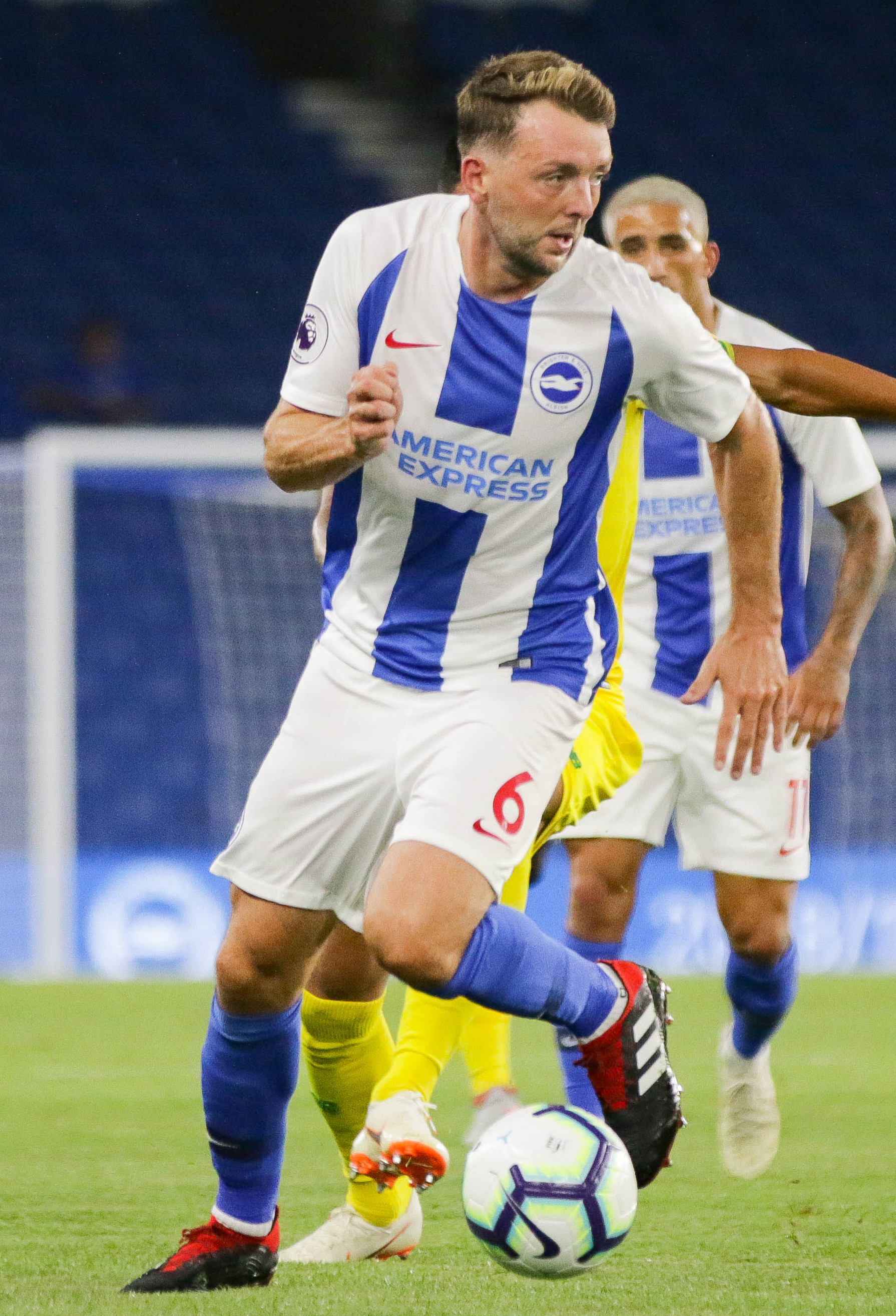
- Stephens playing for Brighton & Hove Albion in 2018

Personal information
- Full name: Dale Christopher Stephens
- Date of birth: 12 June 1989 (age 37)
- Place of birth: Bolton, England
- Height: 6 ft 1 in (1.85 m)
- Position: Central midfielder

Youth career
- –2007: Bury

Senior career*
Years	Team	Apps	(Gls)
2007–2008	Bury	9	(1)
2007	→ Droylsden (loan)	7	(0)
2007	→ Hyde United (loan)	4	(0)
2008–2011	Oldham Athletic	60	(11)
2009	→ Rochdale (loan)	6	(1)
2011	→ Southampton (loan)	6	(0)
2011–2014	Charlton Athletic	84	(9)
2014–2020	Brighton & Hove Albion	213	(14)
2020–2022	Burnley	10	(0)
Total		399	(36)
- * Club domestic league appearances and goals

Dale Christopher Stephens (born 12 June 1989) is an English former professional footballer who played as a central midfielder.

== Early life ==
Stephens was born in Bolton, Greater Manchester.

== Career ==
=== Oldham Athletic ===
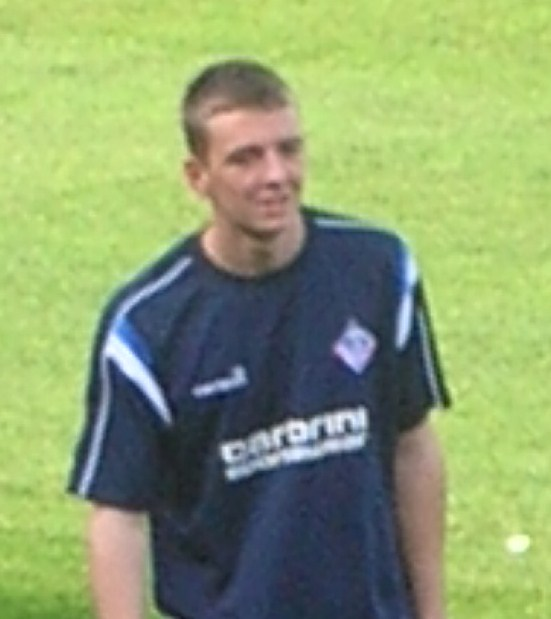
Stephens warming up for Oldham Athletic in 2008

Stephens joined Oldham Athletic on 1 July 2008 after rejecting a new deal at Bury. On 9 March 2010, he scored his first goal for Oldham in a 2–0 win over Leyton Orient.

=== Loans to Rochdale and Southampton ===
On 14 August 2009, Stephens joined Rochdale on a month's loan. He made his debut in a 3–3 draw with Morecambe on 4 September 2009, where he scored the equaliser. It was later extended by another month. On 12 October he extended the loan spell for a third time.

On 24 March 2011, Stephens signed on loan for Southampton until the end of the season. He made his debut as a substitute in a 3–2 victory over MK Dons. He started days later against Charlton Athletic but had to be stretchered off at the end of the first half.

=== Charlton Athletic ===
On 29 June 2011, Stephens signed a three-year contract for Charlton Athletic for an undisclosed fee, estimated to be around £350,000.On the 2011-2012 season with the League One club Charlton Athletic, Stephens won the 2011-2012 League One Title. Stephens made 30 league appearances and scored 4 goals for Charlton Athletic as the club finished top of England's third tier to secure promotion

=== Brighton & Hove Albion ===
On 30 January 2014, Stephens signed a three-and-a-half-year contract with the Premier League club Brighton & Hove Albion for an undisclosed fee. Stephens scored his first goal of the 2015–16 season with a strike against Rotherham United, in a 2–1 win. He followed this up with goals against Bolton Wanderers (2–2 draw), Cardiff (1–1 draw), QPR (2–2 draw), Cardiff (4–1 loss), and Burnley (2–2 draw). He formed a vital partnership with Beram Kayal, and would play an integral part in the side that would go 21 league matches unbeaten.

On 7 May 2016, in an away tie against Middlesbrough with winner takes all to win automatic promotion to the Premier League, Stephens scored a 55th minute equaliser to give Brighton a lifeline as Brighton needed a win to go up. Four minutes after his headed goal, Stephens was sent off for a tackle on Gastón Ramírez. The game finished 1–1, meaning Boro won promotion to the top flight and Stephens' suspension meant he would miss the play-offs in which The Seagulls would lose the two legged semi final to Sheffield Wednesday.

Stephens was a key performer for Brighton throughout the 2016–17 season, helping the club to earn promotion to the Premier League. He signed a new four-year contract with the club in the summer of 2017, with his previous contract set to run out at the conclusion of the season.

Brighton's first match in the top flight for 34 years was at home to eventual champions Manchester City. Stephens played the whole match in the 2–0 defeat on his Premier League debut. He played in Brighton's first ever win in the Premier League in a 3–1 home win over West Brom on 9 September 2017. Stephens scored his first goal of the 2017–18 season on 8 January opening the scoreline in a 2–1 home win against bitter rivals Crystal Palace in the third round of the FA Cup. On 4 May 2018 Stephens played in the match that ensured Brighton Premier League safety with a 1–0 win over Manchester United at Falmer Stadium.

On 10 November 2018 Stephens received his first Premier League red card away against Cardiff. He was sent off at 1–1, it eventually finished 2–1 to The Bluebirds. Stephens scored his first ever Premier League goal away against West Ham opening the scoreline in the 2–2 draw on 2 January 2019. He made 5 FA Cup appearances in the 2018–19 season where The Seagulls made the semi-final.

Stephens played in Brighton's first home win of the 2019–20 season which came on the 5 October where Brighton put three past Tottenham and keeping a clean sheet.

=== Burnley ===
On 24 September 2020, Burnley announced the signing of Stephens on a two-year deal. Two days after the announcement of his signing he made his debut in what also happened to be his 100th Premier league appearance, starting and playing the whole match in the 1–0 home defeat against his former club Southampton.

He made his first appearance of the 2021–22 season on 30 December, coming on as a substitute in the 3–1 away loss at Manchester United. Stephens made his first start of the season on 8 January 2022, starting and playing 82 minutes of the eventual 2–1 FA Cup third round home loss against Huddersfield of the Championship. He made his first Premier League start in over a year on 5 February, playing the whole match of the frustrating 0–0 home draw against Watford. On 10 June, Burnley announced that Stephens would leave the club at the end of the month when his contract expired.

On 28 March 2023, Stephens announced his retirement from football.

== Career statistics ==
As of match played 30 April 2022

Appearances and goals by club, season and competition
Club	Season	League			FA Cup		League Cup		Other		Total	
Club	Season	Division	Apps	Goals	Apps	Goals	Apps	Goals	Apps	Goals	Apps	Goals
Bury	2006–07	League Two	3	0	0	0	0	0	0	0	3	0
Bury	2007–08	League Two	6	1	3	0	0	0	0	0	9	1
Bury	Total		9	1	3	0	0	0	0	0	12	1
Droylsden (loan)	2007–08	Conference Premier	7	0	—		—		—		7	0
Hyde United (loan)	2007–08	Conference North	4	0	—		—		—		4	0
Oldham Athletic	2008–09	League One	0	0	0	0	0	0	0	0	0	0
Oldham Athletic	2009–10	League One	26	2	0	0	0	0	0	0	26	2
Oldham Athletic	2010–11	League One	34	9	1	1	1	0	1 (Note: Appearance in Football League Trophy)	0	37	10
Oldham Athletic	Total		60	11	1	1	1	0	1	0	63	12
Rochdale (loan)	2009–10	League Two	6	1	—		—		—		6	1
Southampton (loan)	2010–11	League One	6	0	—		—		—		6	0
Charlton Athletic	2011–12	League One	30	4	0	0	0	0	1	0	31	4
Charlton Athletic	2012–13	Championship	28	2	1	0	0	0	—		29	2
Charlton Athletic	2013–14	Championship	26	3	2	0	2	1	—		30	4
Charlton Athletic	Total		84	9	3	0	2	1	1	0	90	10
Brighton & Hove Albion	2013–14	Championship	14	2	—		—		0	0	14	2
Brighton & Hove Albion	2014–15	Championship	16	2	0	0	0	0	—		16	2
Brighton & Hove Albion	2015–16	Championship	45	7	0	0	0	0	0	0	45	7
Brighton & Hove Albion	2016–17	Championship	39	2	0	0	0	0	—		39	2
Brighton & Hove Albion	2017–18	Premier League	36	0	3	1	0	0	—		39	1
Brighton & Hove Albion	2018–19	Premier League	30	1	5	0	0	0	—		35	1
Brighton & Hove Albion	2019–20	Premier League	33	0	1	0	0	0	—		34	0
Brighton & Hove Albion	2020–21	Premier League	0	0	—		1	0	—		1	0
Brighton & Hove Albion	Total		213	14	9	1	1	0	0	0	223	15
Burnley	2020–21	Premier League	7	0	3	0	—		—		10	0
Burnley	2021–22	Premier League	3	0	1	0	0	0	—		4	0
Burnley	Total		10	0	4	0	0	0	0	0	14	0
Career total			399	36	20	2	4	1	2	0	425	39

== Honours ==
Charlton Athletic

- Football League One: 2011–12

Brighton & Hove Albion

- EFL Championship runner-up: 2016–17

Other Promotions (2009–10 & 2010–11) :

- Earlier in his career, Stephens also contributed to promotion-winning campaigns during brief loan spells with Rochdale (League Two third-place finish in 2009–10) and Southampton (League One runner-up in 2010–11
