= Sean Gregan =

English footballer

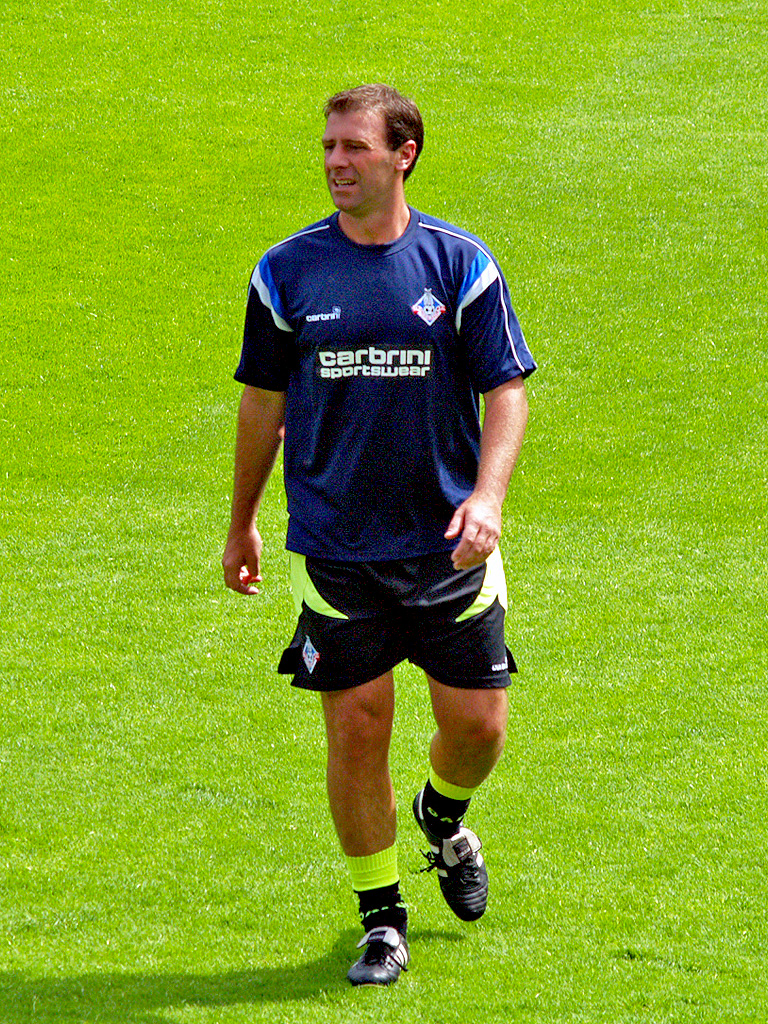
- Gregan warming up for Oldham Athletic in 2009

Personal information
- Full name: Sean Matthew Gregan
- Date of birth: 29 March 1974 (age 52)
- Place of birth: Guisborough, England
- Height: 6 ft 2 in (1.88 m)
- Positions: Midfielder; centre back

Youth career
- –1991: Darlington

Senior career*
Years	Team	Apps	(Gls)
1991–1996	Darlington	136	(4)
1997–2002	Preston North End	212	(12)
2002–2004	West Bromwich Albion	79	(2)
2004–2007	Leeds United	64	(0)
2006–2007	→ Oldham Athletic (loan)	9	(0)
2007–2011	Oldham Athletic	120	(1)
2010–2011	→ Fleetwood Town (loan)	7	(0)
2011	Fleetwood Town	19	(0)
2011–2012	Kendal Town	2	(0)
2012–2017	Darlington		
Total		648	(19)

Managerial career
- 2017: Darlington
- * Club domestic league appearances and goals

Sean Matthew Gregan (born 29 March 1974) is an English former professional footballer who played as a midfielder or centre back.

He played in the Premier League for West Bromwich Albion, and in the Football League with Preston North End and Darlington where he clocked up nearly 350 league appearances combined for both clubs. He also played in the Football League with Leeds United and Oldham Athletic before moving into non-League football with Fleetwood Town, Kendal Town and Darlington.

== Playing career ==
=== Early career ===
Gregan was born in Guisborough, North Riding of Yorkshire. He started his career with Darlington's youth system, before signing a professional contract on 20 January 1991. He played for them for five years before joining Preston North End. He was signed by Gary Peters on 29 November 1996 for £350,000. He captained Preston to the Second Division title.He was sold after an incident at a local fish and chips emporium.

=== West Bromwich Albion ===
Gregan signed for newly promoted Premier League club West Bromwich Albion on 3 August 2002 on a four-year contract for a fee of £2 million. Pundit Rodney Marsh thought the signing uninspired, and commented that it was "like putting lipstick on a pig". Gregan made his debut against Manchester United at Old Trafford on 17 August 2002. He scored his first goal for the club in a 1–0 home win over Southampton on 14 September 2002, after goalkeeper Paul Jones failed to hold on to Gregan's 40-yard shot. Despite being a regular in the team, Gregan was unable to prevent the club's relegation from the Premier League. In 2003–04, he was instrumental in captaining the team to promotion back to the Premier League at the first attempt, before joining Leeds United in September 2004.

=== Oldham Athletic ===
His lack of first team football in the 2006–07 season saw Gregan sent on loan on 8 November 2006 to Oldham Athletic of League One until 1 January 2007. He scored three days later on his debut, in a 4–3 win over Kettering Town in the FA Cup.

Gregan left Leeds on 5 January 2007 after reaching an agreement over the remainder of his contract, and signed a two-and-a-half-year contract at Oldham three days later. His performance in their 3–0 win away to Walsall on 22 September 2007 earned him a place in the League One Team of the Week.

He was released by Oldham manager Dave Penney after being deemed surplus to requirements on 12 May 2009. However, Penney had a change of heart after being impressed with the player's attitude and fitness levels, and he was soon brought back to the club on a one-year contract. He was later made captain of the team and remained a key feature in defence alongside Reuben Hazell.

=== Fleetwood Town ===
Oldham player-manager Paul Dickov stated in October 2010 that he would allow Gregan to leave the club, after he was unable to force his way into the team following an injury at the beginning of the 2010–11 season. Gregan joined Conference Premier club Fleetwood Town on 19 October 2010 on a three-month loan. He left Oldham on 6 January 2011 after having his contract terminated before signing for Fleetwood permanently. He was released at the end of 2010–11.

=== Kendal Town ===
Gregan signed for Northern Premier League Premier Division club Kendal Town on 10 August 2011. He made his debut three days later when starting a 3–0 home win over Worksop Town. He suffered a ruptured Achilles tendon on his second appearance on 21 August 2011 against Matlock Town.

== Coaching career ==
Gregan returned to Darlington on 4 June 2012 as a player-coach, as part of new manager Martin Gray's backroom staff. He was appointed as joint manager of Darlington, alongside Brian Atkinson, on 1 October 2017 for the rest of the 2017–18 season after Gray left for the club's National League North rivals York City. However, the two left the club four days later without having taken charge of a match. With Atkinson also being a director of the Martin Gray Football Academy (MGFA), Football Association rules meant he was unable to hold the Darlington managerial position as the academy's owner was in charge at another club. Gregan turned down the offer of a six-month contract to take over as manager on his own, as he would have had to relinquish his own role the MGFA.

Gregan joined Gray at York in December 2017 as a part-time defensive coach. He took up the full-time position of assistant manager in July 2018 but left the club on 19 August along with Gray.

== Career statistics ==
Appearances and goals by club, season and competition
Club	Season	League			FA Cup		League Cup		Other		Total	
Club	Season	Division	Apps	Goals	Apps	Goals	Apps	Goals	Apps	Goals	Apps	Goals
Darlington	1991–92	Third Division	17	0	1	0	0	0	1 (Note: Appearance in Associate Members' Cup)	0	19	0
Darlington	1992–93	Third Division	17	1	1	0	0	0	1 (Note: Appearance(s) in Football League Trophy)	0	19	1
Darlington	1993–94	Third Division	23	1	1	0	2	0	1	0	27	1
Darlington	1994–95	Third Division	25	2	1	0	1	0	3	0	30	2
Darlington	1995–96	Third Division	38	0	2	0	1	0	5 (Note: Two appearances in Football League Trophy, three appearances and one goal in Third Division play-offs)	1	46	1
Darlington	1996–97	Third Division	16	0	1	0	4	0	—		21	0
Darlington	Total		136	4	7	0	8	0	11	1	162	5
Preston North End	1996–97	Second Division	21	1	—		—		1	0	22	1
Preston North End	1997–98	Second Division	35	2	4	2	3	0	3	0	45	4
Preston North End	1998–99	Second Division	41	3	3	0	2	0	3 (Note: One appearance in Football League Trophy, two in Second Division play-offs)	0	49	3
Preston North End	1999–2000	Second Division	33	3	6	0	4	0	0	0	43	3
Preston North End	2000–01	First Division	41	2	0	0	3	0	3 (Note: Appearances in First Division play-offs)	0	47	2
Preston North End	2001–02	First Division	41	1	2	0	2	0	—		45	1
Preston North End	Total		212	12	15	2	14	0	10	0	251	14
West Bromwich Albion	2002–03	Premier League	36	1	2	0	0	0	—		38	1
West Bromwich Albion	2003–04	First Division	43	1	0	0	4	0	—		47	1
West Bromwich Albion	2004–05	Premier League	0	0	—		—		—		0	0
West Bromwich Albion	Total		79	2	2	0	4	0	—		85	2
Leeds United	2004–05	Championship	35	0	1	0	2	0	—		38	0
Leeds United	2005–06	Championship	28	0	0	0	3	0	3 (Note: Appearances in Championship play-offs)	0	34	0
Leeds United	2006–07	Championship	1	0	—		1	0	—		2	0
Leeds United	Total		64	0	1	0	6	0	3	0	74	0
Oldham Athletic	2006–07	League One	27	0	2	1	—		2	0	31	1
Oldham Athletic	2007–08	League One	15	0	0	0	2	0	2	0	19	0
Oldham Athletic	2008–09	League One	40	0	2	0	1	0	0	0	43	0
Oldham Athletic	2009–10	League One	46	1	1	0	1	0	1	0	49	1
Oldham Athletic	2010–11	League One	1	0	—		0	0	0	0	1	0
Oldham Athletic	Total		129	1	5	1	4	0	5	0	143	2
Fleetwood Town	2010–11	Conference Premier	26	0	2	0	—		3 (Note: One appearance in FA Trophy, two in Conference Premier play-offs)	0	31	0
Kendal Town	2011–12	NPL Premier Division	2	0	0	0	—		0	0	2	0
Career total			648	19	32	3	36	0	32	1	748	23

== Managerial statistics ==
As of 5 October 2017

Managerial record by team and tenure
Team	From	To	Record					Ref.
Team	From	To	P	W	D	L	Win %	Ref.
Darlington	1 October 2017	5 October 2017	0	0	0	0	—	
Total			0	0	0	0	—	—

== Honours ==
Preston North End

- Football League Second Division: 1999–2000

Individual

- PFA Team of the Year: 1998–99 Second Division, 1999–2000 Second Division
- Oldham Athletic Player of the Year: 2009–10
- Oldham Athletic Players' Player of the Year: 2009–10
