= Chris Taylor (footballer, born 1986) =

English footballer

Personal information
- Full name: Christopher David Taylor
- Date of birth: 20 December 1986 (age 39)
- Place of birth: Oldham, England
- Height: 6 ft 0 in (1.83 m)
- Position: Midfielder

Team information
- Current team: FC United of Manchester (Under-18s coach)

Youth career
- 1998–2005: Oldham Athletic

Senior career*
Years	Team	Apps	(Gls)
2005–2012	Oldham Athletic	254	(33)
2012–2013	Millwall	22	(3)
2013–2016	Blackburn Rovers	73	(5)
2016	→ Millwall (loan)	9	(3)
2016–2018	Bolton Wanderers	16	(0)
2017	→ Oldham Athletic (loan)	16	(0)
2018–2019	Blackpool	18	(1)
2019–2020	Bradford City	15	(0)
2020–2021	Barrow	34	(2)
2021–2022	Radcliffe	5	(1)
2022–2023	FC United of Manchester	5	(0)
Total		431	(43)
- * Club domestic league appearances and goals

Christopher David Taylor (born 20 December 1986) is an English former professional footballer who played as a midfielder. He is currently Under 18s coach at FC United of Manchester.

== Career ==
=== Oldham Athletic ===
Taylor, who is a lifelong Oldham fan, signed a professional contract with his hometown club, where a scout, Colin Shaw, scouted him and where he had been a trainee, on 1 August 2005. He made his debut for the club in a 3–0 home win over Nottingham Forest in the 2005–06 season, during which he made a further thirteen league appearances. In the 2006–07 season he made 51 appearances.

On 3 March 2007, Taylor scored his first professional goal in a 1–1 draw with Carlisle United. After waiting 51 games for his first goal, Taylor then scored twice in a 4–0 demolition of Doncaster Rovers in his next game. He then made it four goals from three games with a goal against Leyton Orient in his next game. In April 2007 he signed a new three-year contract until summer 2010.

On 2 June 2008, the Oldham Chronicle reported that Oldham had, the week before, rejected a bid for Taylor by Championship club Blackpool. Newly promoted Doncaster Rovers were also linked with a possible offer and it was claimed that Oldham had placed a £500,000 price tag on Taylor.

Early in Oldham's 2008–09 campaign, Taylor scored a double in a 2–0 victory over Leeds United. Several weeks later on 20 September, he scored another double in a 3–3 draw with Hartlepool United. On 18 March 2009, he signed a new contract for Oldham, extending his contract with the club until 2012. After signing the deal Taylor told the club website: "Everyone knows Oldham is where I want to be, I love playing for this club. "There has always been speculation but all I want is to play for Oldham." His season was cut short, however, when he picked up an ankle injury during a morning training session on 21 April. On 26 April, Taylor was named to League One's Team of the Year, along with teammate Neal Eardley.

On 8 June 2009, both the Oldham Chronicle and Yorkshire Evening Post reported that Leeds United were preparing to make a bid of over £500,000 for Taylor.

=== Millwall ===
On 31 May 2012, Taylor signed a one-year contract for Millwall on a Bosman free transfer from Oldham.

=== Blackburn Rovers ===
On 16 May 2013, it was revealed that Taylor would be signing for Blackburn Rovers at the end of his contract with Millwall. He signed on 1 July 2013. He made his debut in a 1–1 draw against Derby County coming as a 63-minute substitute for Joshua King, putting in a superb cross for Leon Best's equaliser. He scored his first goal for the club three days later in the League Cup against Carlisle United. Taylor scored both of Blackburn's goals in the FA Cup third round against Charlton Athletic, in a game that Blackburn went on to win 2–1. He also scored in the next round as Blackburn knocked out Premier League team Swansea City. Taylor's first league goal for Blackburn came in a 3–2 defeat to Brentford on 17 March 2015.

=== Bolton Wanderers ===
On 1 July 2016, upon the expiry of his Blackburn contract, he made the short move to join Bolton Wanderers on a Free Transfer, becoming Phil Parkinson's first signing since taking over as manager of the Wanderers. In January 2017, he rejoined Oldham Athletic on loan for the rest of the season, making 16 appearances before returning to his parent club. On 24 May 2018, Bolton confirmed that Taylor would leave the club on 30 June when his contract came to an end.

=== Blackpool ===
On 13 June 2018 Taylor signed a one-year contract with Blackpool.

=== Bradford City ===
In July 2019 Taylor went on trial with Bradford City. On 14 October he signed a short-term deal with Bradford City which would keep him at the club until the middle of January 2020. Bradford City manager Gary Bowyer admitted he was shocked that nobody had signed Taylor in the intervening period.

However on 23 October, the deal fell through due to a registration problem stemming from Taylor playing in a FA Lancashire Cup match as a trialist for Barrow after the closure of the transfer window, which could result in a points deduction should he play for Bradford. Bowyer criticised the Football Association and English Football League for the mix-up.

The deal was resurrected and completed on 11 November after Bradford were finally given full assurances that they would not face any sanctions for signing him, with Taylor signing an initial 2-month contract. Bowyer praised Taylor's versatility in November 2019. In December 2019 Taylor said he was keen to make up for the lost time.

In January 2020 Taylor signed a contract extension with the club. Taylor left Bradford City on 13 May 2020 after his contract ended.

=== Barrow ===
On 5 October 2020, nearly a year after they almost cost him a contract at Bradford City, Taylor signed for Barrow on a short-term contract.

=== Non-League ===
On 29 October 2021, aged 34, he dropped into non-league football for the first time when he signed for Northern Premier League Premier Division side Radcliffe.

On 10 February 2022, Taylor signed for Northern Premier League Premier Division side FC United of Manchester.

On 24 April 2023, Taylor announced his retirement from football and he will coach the Under 18s at FC United of Manchester.

== Career statistics ==
As of match played 26 December 2022

Appearances and goals by club, season and competition
Club	Season	League			FA Cup		League Cup		Other		Total	
Club	Season	Division	Apps	Goals	Apps	Goals	Apps	Goals	Apps	Goals	Apps	Goals
Oldham Athletic	2005–06	League One	14	0	0	0	0	0	—		14	0
Oldham Athletic	2006–07	League One	44	4	3	0	0	0	3 (Note: Appearances in Football League Trophy and Football League play-offs)	0	50	4
Oldham Athletic	2007–08	League One	42	5	4	0	2	0	2 (Note: Appearances in Football League Trophy)	0	50	5
Oldham Athletic	2008–09	League One	42	10	2	1	2	0	—		46	11
Oldham Athletic	2009–10	League One	32	1	1	0	1	0	—		34	1
Oldham Athletic	2010–11	League One	42	11	1	0	1	0	1	0	45	11
Oldham Athletic	2011–12	League One	38	2	3	1	1	0	4	0	46	3
Oldham Athletic	Total		254	33	14	2	7	0	10	0	285	35
Millwall	2012–13	Championship	22	3	3	0	1	0	—		26	3
Blackburn Rovers	2013–14	Championship	34	0	2	0	1	1	—		37	1
Blackburn Rovers	2014–15	Championship	16	1	4	3	1	0	—		21	4
Blackburn Rovers	2015–16	Championship	12	0	3	0	0	0	0	0	15	0
Blackburn Rovers	Total		62	1	9	3	2	1	—		73	5
Millwall (loan)	2015–16	League One	10	3	0	0	0	0	3 (Note: Appearances in Football League play-offs)	0	13	3
Bolton Wanderers	2016–17	League One	16	0	4	0	1	0	2	0	23	0
Bolton Wanderers	2017–18	Championship	0	0	0	0	0	0	0	0	0	0
Bolton Wanderers	Total		16	0	4	0	1	0	2	0	23	0
Oldham Athletic (loan)	2016–17	League One	16	0	0	0	0	0	0	0	16	0
Blackpool	2018–19	League One	12	1	2	0	1	0	3	0	18	1
Bradford City	2019–20	League Two	14	0	0	0	0	0	1	0	15	0
Barrow	2020–21	League Two	31	1	1	0	0	0	2	0	34	1
Radcliffe	2021–22	Northern Premier League	5	1	0	0	—		3 (Note: Appearance(s) in the FA Trophy.)	0	8	1
FC United of Manchester	2021–22	Northern Premier League	1	0	0	0	—		0	0	1	0
FC United of Manchester	2022–23	Northern Premier League	4	0	0	0	—		0	0	4	0
Career total			433	43	33	5	12	1	25	0	503	48

== Honours ==
Individual

- PFA Team of the Year: 2009
