= Danny Whitaker =

English footballer (born 1980)

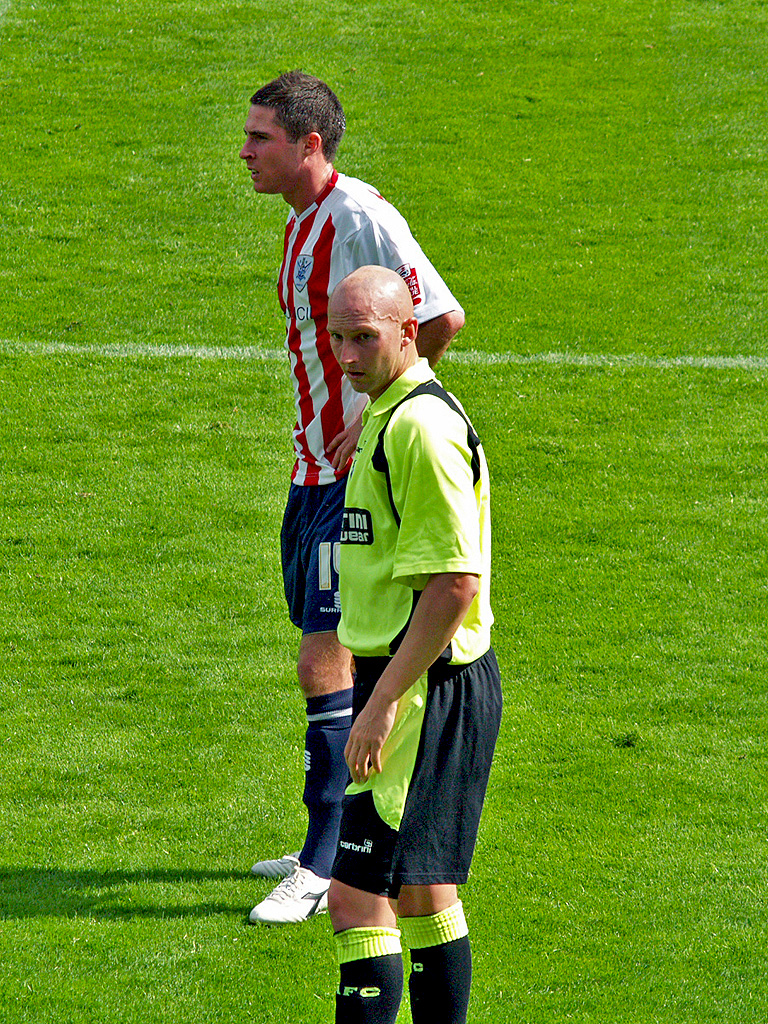
- Whitaker (in green) playing for Oldham Athletic

Personal information
- Full name: Daniel Phillip Whitaker
- Date of birth: 14 November 1980 (age 45)
- Place of birth: Wilmslow, England
- Height: 5 ft 10 in (1.78 m)
- Position: Midfielder

Youth career
- Manchester United
- Bradford City

Senior career*
Years	Team	Apps	(Gls)
- Wilmslow Albion
2001–2006	Macclesfield Town	172	(23)
2006–2008	Port Vale	86	(13)
2008–2010	Oldham Athletic	80	(8)
2010–2013	Chesterfield	106	(21)
2013–2019	Macclesfield Town	226	(37)
2020	Macclesfield Town	0	(0)
2021–2022	Macclesfield	1	(0)
Total		671	(102)

Managerial career
- 2018: Macclesfield Town (caretaker)
- 2019: Macclesfield Town (caretaker)
- 2020: Macclesfield Town (caretaker)
- 2020–2022: Macclesfield
- 2023–2024: Bradford (Park Avenue)
- * Club domestic league appearances and goals

Daniel Phillip Whitaker (born 14 November 1980) is an English former professional football player and manager.

A former Manchester United Academy player, Whitaker turned professional with Macclesfield Town in 2001. He spent five years with the club and made over 200 appearances in all competitions before he switched to Port Vale in June 2006. He played over 100 games for the Vale in two seasons before he signed for Oldham Athletic in June 2008. Again a first-team regular, he left after two seasons to join Chesterfield in May 2010. He helped the club to the League Two title in 2010–11 and also won himself a place on the division's PFA Team of the Year. He also helped the club to the Football League Trophy title in 2012. He returned to Macclesfield Town in August 2013. He played in the club's defeat at the 2017 FA Trophy final before helping the club to win promotion back to the English Football League as champions of the National League. He was appointed the club's caretaker manager in November 2018 before retiring in July 2019. He again became caretaker manager at Macclesfield in August 2019 and January 2020 before being appointed the first manager in October 2020.

Whitaker led phoenix club Macclesfield to the North West Counties Premier Division title at the end of the 2021–22 season before losing his job in October 2022. He took charge at Bradford (Park Avenue) in December 2023, lasting nine months in the role.

== Playing career ==
=== Macclesfield Town ===
Whitaker was a Manchester United junior, and spent time at both Bradford City and local side Wilmslow Albion before signing with Macclesfield Town. He scored on his Football League debut; during a 2–1 home defeat to Exeter City on 2 February 2002. He went on to make another 15 Third Division appearances that season, earning a fresh contract upon the season's end.

A regular in the 2002–03 season, he scored a hat-trick in the League Cup 4–1 triumph over Barnsley on 11 September. In the most unusual fashion, all three goals came in the second period of extra time. With ten goals before the winter break, he was linked to both Oldham Athletic and Preston North End. However, manager David Moss was highly dismissive of such speculation, saying: "Quite frankly, I am sick and tired of reading about players who have just signed two-year contracts but want to get away. Danny Whitaker will be going nowhere except Macclesfield reserves if he doesn't improve." The club insisted that Whitaker was too valuable a player to let go. This transfer talk came despite him having recently signed a contract to keep him with the "Silkmen" until June 2005.

Rated as a star player before the start of the 2003–04 season, he had a rather quiet season with just six goals, going 22 games without a goal from November to the season's finish. He scored just four goals in the 2004–05 season, though manager Brian Horton was still keen to hold on to him, despite nine others being deemed unworthy of a new deal. Six goals in 45 appearances followed in 2005–06. However, despite having been established in the heart of the Macclesfield midfield for the past four years and winning the club's Player of the Year award, he was released at the end of the season.

=== Port Vale ===
Now a free agent, Whitaker moved up to League One with Port Vale in June 2006. He played 51 games in his first season at Vale Park. At the end of the 2007–08 season, where Whitaker again played 40+ games, he was offered a new contract with three other players. But in May he rejected the contract and was told he could look for another club. However, Lee Sinnott told Whitaker that he would get back to him with a better offer if chairman Bill Bratt could raise some more money, the wage bill having been cut due to relegation. In June, he was offered an improved deal. Whilst mulling over the offer he was given a deadline. On 20 June 2008, he turned down the chance to stay at Vale, and instead opted to join Oldham Athletic, still in League One.

=== Oldham Athletic ===
Whitaker scored eight goals in 42 appearances for the "Latics" during the 2008–09 season. He was released at the end of the 2009–10 season despite missing only a handful of games during his spell at the club.

=== Chesterfield ===
Whitaker was signed by Chesterfield in May 2010, linking up with his old boss John Sheridan. He started the 2010–11 campaign with three goals in as many league games, having bagged a hat-trick against Hereford United. Playing in all of the club's league games, scoring 15 goals, Chesterfield won promotion as champions of League Two. He was also named in the PFA Team of the Year, along with teammates Craig Davies and Tommy Lee. The following season, 2011–12, the "Spireites" struggled at the bottom of League One, and Whittaker lost his first-team place in the new year. He was an unused substitute as Chesterfield beat Swindon Town in the final of the Football League Trophy at Wembley Stadium. The club offered him a new one-year contract in May 2012. He made 34 appearances in the 2012–13 campaign and was not offered a new contract by manager Paul Cook.

=== Return to Macclesfield ===
Whitaker re-signed with Conference Premier club Macclesfield Town in August 2013. He made 49 appearances for John Askey's "Silkmen" across the 2013–14 campaign. He agreed to a new one-year deal in July 2014. He scored six goals in 30 games in the 2014–15 season. He scored eight goals in 50 appearances in the 2015–16 campaign as Macclesfield finished in tenth position and signed a new one-year contract in July 2016. He made 55 appearances across the 2016–17 campaign, including in the 2017 FA Trophy final at Wembley Stadium, where Macclesfield were beaten 3–2 by York City. He scored eight goals in 45 appearances in 2017–18 as Macclesfield won promotion back to the Football League as champions of the National League, as the 37-year-old earned the nickname of "Benjamin Button" from his teammates. He was named on the National League Team of the Season.

On 8 October 2018, Whitaker and Neil Howarth were appointed as Macclesfield Town's joint-caretaker managers following the dismissal of Mark Yates. They remained in charge until Sol Campbell was appointed as manager on 27 November. He scored three goals in 26 games as Macclesfield secured their safety at the end of the 2018–19 season. He announced his retirement in July 2019. He again was appointed as Macclesfield Town's caretaker-manager following the resignation of Sol Campbell on 15 August 2019. He won his one game in charge, before returning to his coaching duties once Daryl McMahon was appointed as manager four days later. McMahon resigned on 3 January 2020, leaving Whitaker to once again step in as caretaker manager. He remained in the role for 13 days until the appointment of Mark Kennedy. He stayed on in the role of assistant manager under first Kennedy and then Tim Flowers. He came out of retirement to sign a one-year playing contract with Macclesfield on 15 September 2020, but the club was liquidated a day later.

== Coaching career ==
=== Macclesfield ===
Whitaker was appointed as the first-ever manager of Macclesfield Town's phoenix club, Macclesfield F.C., on 13 October 2020. He was also registered as a player, and played himself in the first competitive match for the new club on 31 July 2021, in a 1–0 win at home to Burscough in the North West Counties League Premier Division. Following the early suspension of the 2020–21 season, the 2021–22 season saw Macclesfield win the title having finished on 94 points, 15 clear of second placed Skelmersdale United, the title having been secured on 12 March after a 4–0 victory over Ashton Athletic. Whittaker was sacked by the club on 29 October 2022, following a sequence of three defeats in five home games and the club's elimination from the FA Cup and FA Trophy.

=== Bradford (Park Avenue) ===
On 20 December 2023, Whitaker was appointed head coach of Northern Premier League Premier Division club Bradford (Park Avenue). The club were relegated at the end of the 2023–24 season. He was sacked on 26 August 2024.

=== Return to Macclesfield ===
In August 2024, he returned to Macclesfield as a coach in head coach's Robbie Savage backroom staff.

== Career statistics ==
=== Playing statistics ===
Appearances and goals by club, season and competition
Club	Season	League			FA Cup		League Cup		Other		Total	
Club	Season	Division	Apps	Goals	Apps	Goals	Apps	Goals	Apps	Goals	Apps	Goals
Macclesfield Town	2001–02	Third Division	16	2	0	0	0	0	0	0	16	2
Macclesfield Town	2002–03	Third Division	41	10	3	1	2	3	1 (Note: Appearance(s) in the Football League Trophy / EFL Trophy)	0	47	14
Macclesfield Town	2003–04	Third Division	36	5	4	0	1	1	1	0	42	6
Macclesfield Town	2004–05	League Two	38	2	3	1	1	0	3	1	45	4
Macclesfield Town	2005–06	League Two	41	4	2	0	2	1	6	1	51	6
Macclesfield Town	Total		172	23	12	2	6	5	11	2	201	32
Port Vale	2006–07	League One	45	6	2	1	4	1	2	0	53	8
Port Vale	2007–08	League One	41	7	3	0	1	0	0	0	45	7
Port Vale	Total		86	13	5	1	5	1	2	0	98	15
Oldham Athletic	2008–09	League One	39	6	1	1	2	0	1	1	43	8
Oldham Athletic	2009–10	League One	41	2	1	0	1	0	1	1	44	3
Oldham Athletic	Total		80	8	2	1	3	0	2	2	87	11
Chesterfield	2010–11	League Two	46	15	2	0	1	0	2	0	51	15
Chesterfield	2011–12	League One	30	5	1	0	1	2	3	1	35	8
Chesterfield	2012–13	League Two	30	1	2	0	1	0	1	1	34	2
Chesterfield	Total		106	21	5	0	3	2	6	2	120	25
Macclesfield Town	2013–14	Conference Premier	44	4	5	1	—		0	0	49	5
Macclesfield Town	2014–15	Conference Premier	29	6	0	0	—		1 (Note: Appearance(s) in the FA Trophy)	0	30	6
Macclesfield Town	2015–16	National League	44	7	2	0	—		4	1	50	8
Macclesfield Town	2016–17	National League	43	8	4	2	—		8	1	55	11
Macclesfield Town	2017–18	National League	44	9	1	0	—		0	0	45	9
Macclesfield Town	2018–19	EFL League Two	22	3	0	0	3	1	1	0	26	4
Macclesfield Town	Total		226	37	12	3	3	1	14	2	255	43
Macclesfield	2021–22	North West Counties League; Premier Division	1	0	0	0	—		0	0	1	0
Career total			671	102	36	7	20	9	35	8	762	126

=== Managerial statistics ===
As of match played 26 August 2024

Managerial record by team and tenure
Team	From	To	Record					Ref.
Team	From	To	P	W	D	L	Win %	Ref.
Macclesfield Town (caretaker)	8 October 2018	27 November 2018	11	4	0	7	36.4	
Macclesfield Town (caretaker)	15 August 2019	19 August 2019	1	1	0	0	100.0	
Macclesfield Town (caretaker)	3 January 2020	16 January 2020	2	1	1	0	50.0	
Macclesfield	13 October 2020	29 October 2022	68	48	7	13	70.6	
Bradford (Park Avenue)	20 December 2023	26 August 2024	27	5	5	17	18.5	
Total			109	59	13	37	54.1	

== Honours ==
=== As a player ===
Chesterfield

- Football League Two: 2010–11
- Football League Trophy: 2011–12

Macclesfield Town

- National League: 2017–18
- FA Trophy runner-up: 2016–17

Individual

- Macclesfield Town Player of the Year: 2005–06
- PFA Team of the Year: 2010–11 League Two
- National League Team of the Season: 2017–18

=== As a manager ===
Macclesfield

- North West Counties Premier Division: 2021–22
