= Reuben Hazell =

English footballer (born 1979)

Personal information
- Full name: Reuben Hazell
- Date of birth: 24 April 1979 (age 47)
- Place of birth: Birmingham, England
- Height: 5 ft 11 in (1.80 m)
- Position: Defender

Senior career*
Years	Team	Apps	(Gls)
1998–1999	Aston Villa	0	(0)
1999–2002	Tranmere Rovers	42	(1)
2002	→ Torquay United (loan)	5	(0)
2002–2004	Torquay United	79	(2)
2004–2005	Kidderminster Harriers	0	(0)
2005–2007	Chesterfield	72	(1)
2007–2011	Oldham Athletic	151	(7)
2011–2012	Shrewsbury Town	10	(0)
Total		359	(11)
- * Club domestic league appearances and goals

Reuben Daniel Hazell (born 24 April 1979) is an English former professional footballer who played as a defender.

== Club career ==
Hazell started his career as a youth player with Aston Villa before playing for Tranmere Rovers, Torquay United, Kidderminster Harriers and Chesterfield, where he scored once against Swansea City. Whilst at Tranmere he played in the 2000 Football League Cup Final, and scored one league goal in a 2–1 win over Portsmouth in March 2000.

He joined Oldham Athletic in September 2007. He was appointed the club's vice-captain at the start of the 2010–11 season before being promoted to club captain after the departure of Sean Gregan.

At the end of the 2010–11 season he declined the offer of a new contract from Oldham and he left the club in June 2011. He subsequently joined Shrewsbury Town ahead of the start of pre-season training on a two-year deal. However, he was missed most of the season after suffering cruciate ligament damage in a match against Torquay United as a result of a tackle by Torquay striker Rene Howe, whom Hazell later criticised in the Shropshire Star. On 15 October 2012, Hazell left Shrewsbury after his contract was terminated by mutual consent.

== Coaching career ==
Hazell managed the Panjab football team at the 2018 ConIFA World Football Cup.

== Honours ==
Tranmere Rovers

- Football League Cup runner-up: 1999–2000
