= Paul Black (English footballer) =

English footballer

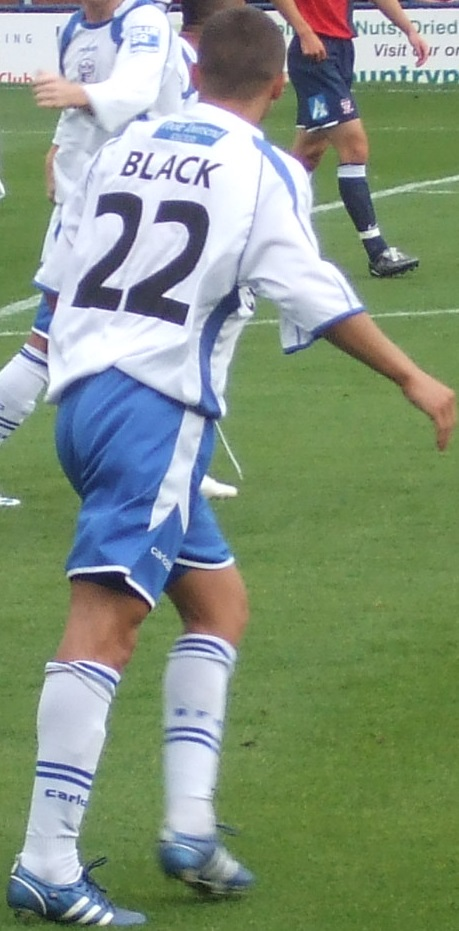
- Black playing for Barrow in 2008

Personal information
- Full name: Paul Michael Black
- Date of birth: 18 January 1990 (age 36)
- Place of birth: Middleton, England
- Height: 6 ft 0 in (1.83 m)
- Position: Defender

Youth career
- 2006–2008: Oldham Athletic

Senior career*
Years	Team	Apps	(Gls)
2008–2012	Oldham Athletic	103	(1)
2008–2009	→ Barrow (loan)	7	(2)
2012–2013	Tranmere Rovers	18	(0)
2013–2014	Mansfield Town	0	(0)
2013	→ Carlisle United (loan)	4	(0)
2014–2015	Cheltenham Town	3	(0)
2015	Atlanta Silverbacks	29	(0)
2016–2017	North Carolina FC	49	(0)
- * Club domestic league appearances and goals as of 13:27, 30 October 2017 (UTC)

Paul Michael Black (born 18 January 1990) is an English footballer.

== Career ==
=== Oldham Athletic ===
Growing up to have the dream to become a footballer, Black was a product of the Manchester City FC's youth system before joining Oldham Athletic and becoming a regular in the starting eleven during the 2006–07 season, becoming a captain for the youth squad. In November 2007, he was included in the senior team for the first time but was not used as a substitute in a 2–2 draw versus Doncaster Rovers. On 16 January 2008, Black signed a two-and-a-half-year contract with Oldham Athletic. His first appearance came on 29 March 2008 as he came on in the 76th minute as a substitute during a 4–1 rout of Huddersfield Town.

He joined Barrow A.F.C. on a one-month loan deal on 22 August 2008, though it was later extended until 5 January 2009. However, he rejoined Oldham on 1 January 2009, becoming a first team regular under manager Dave Penney during the latter half of the 2009–10 season and then scored his first goal, in a 2–2 draw against Southend United on 24 April 2010, which led Southend United relegated to League Two. The following season he continued to hold down a regular place under new manager Paul Dickov, starting most of Oldham's league matches in the left back position, and being offered a new contract in May 2011

After a similar start to the 2011–12 season, injury kept him out from the end of August until November. He made his return, setting up one of the goals, in a 5–2 win against Chesterfield on 19 November 2011 and then won his place back, but a further injury in February took him out of the picture, and on 27 April 2012, Black was informed that he would not be offered a new contract at the end of the season. He left the club having made over 100 appearances and scoring once.

=== Tranmere Rovers ===
He signed for Tranmere Rovers on a 1-year deal on 5 July 2012, just in time for pre season training. However, Black's debut was delayed after suffering a thigh injury and made his return in the reserve match in late-September.

Black made his debut for the club on 13 October 2012, coming on as a substitute for Adam McGurk in the 86th minute, in a 3–2 win over Yeovil Town. After making ten appearances for Tranmere Rovers, it announced on 29 April 2013 that Black was among five players to be released by the club.

=== Mansfield Town, Carlisle United and Cheltenham Town ===
On 22 May 2013, Black signed for Mansfield Town. At the end of the 2013/14 season, he was released by Mansfield, having made only one appearance for the club (as a late FA Cup substitute).

On 9 August 2013 he joined Carlisle United on a months loan. Explaining the move, Manager Paul Cox stated Black joined Carlisle United for match experience after Black was not included for the first two opening game of the season. Black made his Carlisle United the next day, coming on as a substitute for Patrick Brough in the last 20 minutes, in a 4–0 loss against Bradford City. After making four appearances, Black made his return to his parent club after sustaining a minor groin problem, which kept him for weeks.

After leaving Mansfield Town, Black joined Cheltenham Town on a one-year contract on 24 June 2014. After months joining the club, Black finally made his league debut for the club, in a 1–1 draw against Dagenham & Redbridge on 20 September 2014. It announced on 19 January 2015 that Black left Cheltenham Town, having made five appearances in all competitions. However, Black stated he already made a move to play in the America.

=== Atlanta Sliverbacks ===
After hinting a move to USA, the move for Black was revealed when he joined Atlanta Silverbacks in the NASL on 27 January 2015, along with another compatriot player, Simon Mensing and Gary Smith.

=== Carolina RailHawks ===
After one season in Atlanta, Black signed with fellow NASL side Carolina RailHawks on 6 January 2016.

== International ==
Black was called up for the England national under-18 football team and also England national under-19 football team.
