= Greg Fleming (footballer) =

Scottish footballer (born 1986)

Personal information
- Full name: Greg William Edward Fleming
- Date of birth: 27 September 1986 (age 40)
- Place of birth: Dunfermline, Scotland
- Position: Goalkeeper

Team information
- Current team: Annan Athletic (player/goalkeeping coach)
- Number: 12

Youth career
- Woodside BC (Glenrothes)
- 2001–2005: Livingston

Senior career*
Years	Team	Apps	(Gls)
2005–2008	Gretna	30	(0)
2008–2011	Oldham Athletic	18	(0)
2009–2010	→ Dunfermline Athletic (loan)	26	(0)
2011	Galway United	21	(0)
2011–2012	Chesterfield	10	(0)
2012–2013	Grimsby Town	3	(0)
2013–2014	Carlisle United	4	(0)
2014	Celtic Nation	0	(0)
2014–2015	Stenhousemuir	18	(0)
2015–2017	Ayr United	72	(0)
2017–2020	Peterhead	99	(0)
2020–2021	Stranraer	22	(0)
2021–	Annan Athletic	99	(0)

International career
2008	Scotland U21	1	(0)
- * Club domestic league appearances and goals as of 11:19, 6 May 2023 (UTC)

Greg William Edward Fleming (born 27 September 1986) is a Scottish footballer who plays as a goalkeeper for Scottish League One club Annan Athletic.

He has previously played for Livingston, Gretna, Oldham Athletic, Dunfermline Athletic, Galway United, Chesterfield, Grimsby Town, Carlisle United, Celtic Nation, Stenhousemuir, Ayr United, Peterhead and Stranraer.

== Club career ==
=== Early career ===
Fleming was born on 27 September 1986, in Dunfermline. He attended Dunfermline High School where Craig Wilson was in the same year group. Fleming started his career with Livingston as part of the youth system, but he did not make a first-team appearance. He signed for Gretna in the summer of 2005. Fleming started to become a first-team regular during Gretna's only season in the Scottish Premier League. During October 2007, Fleming's contract was extended by Gretna and he was selected by the Scotland Under-21 side.

On 19 May 2008, however, Fleming was part of the remaining 40 staff members who were released by Gretna due to their severe financial problems.

=== England and Ireland club career ===
After leaving Gretna, Greg was not out of work long as Oldham Athletic signed him to a three-year contract on 21 May. He joined Dunfermline Athletic on a one-year loan deal in July 2009.

In July 2010, he was transfer-listed by the club, along with five other first team players.

On 31 January 2011, Fleming was released by Oldham Athletic.

Fleming found a new club, signing for Galway United on a deal until the end of the season.

On 29 July 2011, he signed a 12-month contract to be Tommy Lee's understudy at Chesterfield. He was released by the club in May 2012 after not being offered a new deal.

On 21 July 2012 Fleming joined Grimsby Town on trial and played in the club's 0–0 draw with Hull City. On 24 July 2012 he accepted an offer from Grimsby and signed a one-year contract to compete with the club's first choice keeper James McKeown. Despite being handed the number 1 shirt for the season Fleming become the second choice at Blundell Park and didn't make his league debut until 22 January 2013 in a 2–0 victory over Hyde United. Fleming was released by Grimsby on 3 May 2013.

In July 2013, Fleming joined Workington on trial. Having played against Carlisle United for Workington he earned a trial with Carlisle United. On 2 August 2013, he signed a short-term deal with the club before being released at the end of the season. On 17 June 2014, Fleming signed for Carlisle's Northern League side Celtic Nation.

=== Return to Scotland ===
Fleming signed for Scottish League One club Stenhousemuir on 15 August 2014, having been released by Celtic Nation following their financial problems. He made his debut the following day, in a 1–0 defeat against Brechin City. After just one season with The Warriors, Fleming transferred to Scottish League One rivals Ayr United. Since signing for Ayr United, Fleming has saved 12 out of the 14 penalties he has faced, including 3 from 4 in the 2015–16 Scottish Championship play off win over Stranraer.

Following Ayr's relegation back to Scottish League One, and their decision to become a full-time club from the beginning of 2017–18 season, Fleming departed Somerset Park in June 2017 due to work commitments that meant he would be unable to train and play with the club on a full-time basis. Fleming subsequently signed with Scottish League Two side Peterhead.

After leaving Peterhead, Fleming signed for Stranraer. He made 31 appearances for the club in all competitions.

At the start of the 2021–22 season, Fleming signed for Scottish League Two club Annan Athletic. In April 2022, he signed a new contract with the club to take him through to the 2022–23 season. Following Annan's promotion to Scottish League One, he signed a new contract in June 2023. In a 1–1 draw against Stirling Albion on 4 May 2024, Fleming made his 550th career appearance in all competitions. The result also meant that Annan had stayed up from relegation.

== International career ==
In 2007, he was selected by the Scotland under-21 side.

== Honours ==
Chesterfield

- Football League Trophy: 2011–12

Stenhousemuir

- Scottish League One play-offs: 2015

Ayr United

- Scottish Championship play-offs: 2016

Annan Athletic

- Scottish League Two play-offs: 2023
