= Kelvin Lomax =

English footballer (born 1986)

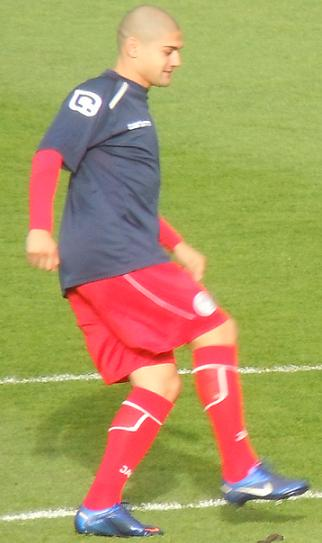
- Lomax with Hyde United in 2012

Personal information
- Full name: Kelvin Trippier
- Date of birth: 12 November 1986 (age 39)
- Place of birth: Bury, England
- Height: 5 ft 9 in (1.75 m)
- Position: Defender

Youth career
- 2000–2004: Oldham Athletic

Senior career*
Years	Team	Apps	(Gls)
2004–2011	Oldham Athletic	82	(0)
2007	→ Rochdale (loan)	10	(0)
2010–2011	→ Chesterfield (loan)	4	(0)
2011	Shrewsbury Town	1	(0)
2011–2012	Barrow	26	(0)
2012–2013	Hyde United	29	(0)
2013	Shepparton United	17	(6)
2013–2014	Ramsbottom United	9	(0)
2014	Hyde United	13	(0)
2015	Bacup Borough		
Total		191	(0)
- * Club domestic league appearances and goals as of 22:23, 31 December 2013 (UTC)

Kelvin Lomax, or Kelvin Trippier, (born 12 November 1986) is an English former footballer. He played as a defender.

He started his career in the youth team at Oldham Athletic before working his way through to the first team. He went on loan spells with Rochdale and Chesterfield during his time with the "Latics". After seven years with Oldham's first team, he was released and he subsequently signed for Shrewsbury Town. After one season with Shrewsbury, he was released and he dropped down to non-League to play for Barrow and then Hyde United. When he left Hyde he moved to Australia to play for Shepparton United, before moving back to England signing for Ramsbottom United. He then played for Hyde United and Bacup Borough before retiring.

== Career ==
Kelvin Lomax was born in Bury, Greater Manchester. His father is Chris Trippier, although he later used his mother Eleanor Lomax's surname in his professional career. Lomax started his career at Oldham Athletic, making his senior debut in May 2004. He spent seven years at Oldham, including a few loan spells at other clubs. He made a total of 82 appearances for Oldham. He had his first loan spell at Rochdale in 2007, where he made 10 appearances. He made regular appearances for Oldham after returning from loan in January 2008. In October 2009, when he was only 22, he fractured his tibia and fibula during a match against Brighton, which affected his career. Although he returned to the team a month later he played only a few more games for the club. The following season he played for Chesterfield, whom he signed for on an emergency loan in November 2010, and for whom he appeared five times before an injury meant his return to Oldham.

In July 2010 he was transfer-listed by the club, along with five other first team players. His contract was terminated by Oldham on 31 January 2011 and a day later he signed for Shrewsbury Town on a six-month contract. He made his debut for the club coming on as an 86th-minute substitute for Jermaine Grandison in a 3–0 defeat to Bury on 1 March 2011. This proved to be his only appearance for the club and he was released at the end of the season.

After his release from Shrewsbury, Lomax went on trial with Conference National side Barrow, Dave Bayliss, manager of Barrow said, "Kelvin is a lad we do want to sign, we'll see what's in the budget and hopefully get something done." On 12 August 2011, he completed his move to Barrow after his successful trial period. Just a day later, he made his debut for the club as part of a 1–1 draw with Tamworth. Just three days after his debut he was sent off in a 3–1 defeat to York City. After 26 appearances and no goals, he was released at the end of the 2011–12 season.

On 10 August 2012, he signed for Conference National side Hyde. He made his Hyde debut on 14 August 2012, coming on as a substitute for Tunji Moses in their 0–0 draw with Barrow. After making 34 appearances without scoring he left Hyde to sign for Australian side Shepparton United. He made his debut for the Australian club in their 1–0 defeat to Shepparton South on 14 April 2013. He scored his first goal for the club just over a month later, scoring in a 3–1 win over Cobram SC on 19 May 2013. He left Australia at the end of their season, having scored six goals in seventeen games for Shepparton United.

On his return to England he signed for his local side Ramsbottom United on 31 October 2013. He made his Ramsbottom debut in a 4–0 win over Harrogate Railway Athletic on 26 October 2013. He left the club two months later having made twelve appearances, nine of which in the league. On 1 January 2014, Lomax re-signed for Conference Premier side Hyde, making the first appearance of his second spell on the same day in a 3–0 defeat to Macclesfield Town.

== Personal life ==
Lomax attended Woodhey High School in Ramsbottom. His brother Kieran Trippier is also a professional footballer.

== Career statistics ==
As of 1 January 2013.

Club	Season	League^{[A]}		FA Cup		League Cup		Other^{[B]}		Total	
Club	Season	Apps	Goals	Apps	Goals	Apps	Goals	Apps	Goals	Apps	Goals
Oldham Athletic	2003–04	1	0	0	0	0	0	0	0	1	0
Oldham Athletic	2004–05	9	0	1	0	0	0	2	0	12	0
Oldham Athletic	2005–06	0	0	0	0	0	0	0	0	0	0
Oldham Athletic	2006–07	9	0	1	0	0	0	2	0	12	0
Oldham Athletic	2007–08	21	0	1	0	0	0	1	0	23	0
Oldham Athletic	2008–09	27	0	2	0	1	0	1	0	31	0
Oldham Athletic	2009–10	15	0	0	0	0	0	0	0	15	0
Oldham Athletic	2010–11	0	0	0	0	0	0	0	0	0	0
Oldham Athletic	Total	82	0	5	0	1	0	6	0	94	0
Rochdale (loan)	2007–08	10	0	0	0	0	0	0	0	10	0
Chesterfield (loan)	2010–11	4	0	1	0	0	0	0	0	5	0
Shrewsbury Town	2010–11	1	0	0	0	0	0	0	0	1	0
Barrow	2011–12	26	0	1	0	0	0	1	0	28	0
Hyde	2012–13	12	0	1	0	0	0	0	0	13	0
Shepparton United	2013	17	6	0	0	0	0	0	0	17	6
Ramsbottom United	2013–14	9	0	0	0	0	0	3	0	12	0
Hyde	2013–14	1	0	0	0	0	0	0	0	1	0
Career totals		154	6	8	0	1	0	10	0	181	6

== Footnotes ==
A. The "League" column constitutes appearances and goals (including those as a substitute) in the Football League and Football Conference.
B. The "Other" column constitutes appearances and goals (including those as a substitute) in the Football League Trophy and FA Trophy.
