= 2013–14 Oldham Athletic A.F.C. season =

Oldham Athletic
2013–14 season
- Chairman: Simon Corney
- Manager: Lee Johnson
- League One: 15th
- FA Cup: Third round
- League Cup: First round
- Johnstone's Paint Trophy: Semi-final (N)
- Top goalscorer: League: Jonson Clarke-Harris (6); All: Danny Philliskirk (12)
- Highest home attendance: 7,698; Notts County (Lg 1) (03/05/14)
- Lowest home attendance: 2,646; Notts County (JPT) (12/11/13)
Home colours	Away colours	Third colours

The 2013–14 season was Oldham Athletic's 17th consecutive season in the third division of the English football league system and Lee Johnson's first full season as manager of the club.

The Latics faced a summer of rebuilding on and off the pitch as 18 players were out of contract from the 2012–13 season and work finally recommenced on the demolition of the old Broadway Stand in preparation for its replacement by the new North Stand. Dean Bouzanis, Robbie Simpson, Connor Hughes, Liam Jacob, Alex Cisak, Lee Croft and Dan Taylor were all released at the end of the 2012–13 season with new contracts handed to Glenn Belezika, Cliff Byrne, Connor Brown, David Mellor, James Tarkowski and Kirk Millar as well as youngsters Joe Cooper, Chris Sutherland, Luke Simpson and Danny Gosset. Matt Smith opted to join Leeds United after his impressive run of goals during the 2012-13 FA Cup while Dean Furman joined former manager Paul Dickov at Doncaster Rovers and Jean-Yves Mvoto joined Barnsley.

In their place, Johnson signed wingers Sidney Schmeltz and James Dayton as well as strengthening the centre of midfield with Anton Rodgers and the permanent acquisition of Korey Smith who had ended the previous season on loan at Boundary Park from Norwich City. A trio of forwards were also recruited: Charlie MacDonald, Jonson Clarke-Harris and, following a protracted contract dispute with Swindon Town, Adam Rooney. Johnson signed goalkeeper Mark Oxley on a season long loan from Hull City but his only defensive acquisition before the season began was the young Latvian centre back, Edijs Joksts. As a result, the season began with young midfielder David Mellor employed at centre back alongside James Tarkowski.

The season began positively for Oldham with a 4–3 victory away at Stevenage. This was followed by defeat at home to Derby in the first round of the Capital One Cup and a run of games in which Oldham were praised for their attractive style of play but ultimately achieved only 8 points from their first 10 league games. In the meantime, the summer transfer window had closed with the departure of Baxter to Sheffield United for an undisclosed fee, the return of Danny Philliskirk and the arrival of defensive duo Matteo Lanzoni and Genseric Kusunga.

== Squad & Coaching Staff ==
=== First Team Squad ===
Includes all players who were awarded a squad number during the season. Last updated on 15 December 2013
*Total appearances and goals as at the end of the 2013–14 season

Squad No.	Name	Nat.	Position	Date of birth	Signed from	Signed in	Total Apps*	Total Goals*	Notes
Goalkeepers
1	Mark Oxley	(England)	GK	28-09-1990	Hull City	2013 (loan)	24	0	Season long loan from Hull City.
25	Luke Simpson	(England)	GK	23-09-1994	Youth Team	2013 (turned pro)	0	0	Loaned to Nantwich Town on 17 August 2013. Contract expired at end of season.
29	Paul Rachubka	(United States)	GK	21-05-1981	Unattached	2013	19	0	Signed on 7 September 2013.
33	Joel Coleman	(England)	GK		Youth Team	2013 (turned pro)	0	0	
Defenders
2	Connor Brown	(England)	RB	02-10-1991	Unattached	2012	35	0	
3	Jonathan Grounds	(England)	LB	02-02-1988	Unattached	2012	78	1	Contract expired at end of season.
5	Genseric Kusunga	(Angola)	CB	12-03-1988	Unattached	2013	14	1	Signed on 2 September 2013.
6	James Tarkowski	(England)	CB	19-11-1992	Youth Team	2011 (turned pro)	78	6	
6	Adel Gafaiti	(Algeria)	CB	16-07-1994	Norwich City	2014			Loaned from Norwich City on 14 March 2014.
16	Cliff Byrne	(Republic of Ireland)	CB	26-04-1982	Unattached	2012	43	1	Loaned to Scunthorpe on 12 September 2013.
16	James Wilson	(Wales)	CB	26-02-1989	Bristol City	2014			Signed from Bristol City on 31 January 2014.
18	Matteo Lanzoni	(Italy)	CB	18-07-1988	Unattached	2013	12	1	Signed on 29 August 2013.
18	Adam Lockwood	(England)	CB	26-10-1981	Unattached	2014			Signed on 3 January 2014.
22	Glenn Belezika	(England)	CB	24-12-1994	Youth Team	2012 (turned pro)	5	0	Loaned to Salisbury City on 23 August 2013.
23	Joseph Mills	(England)	LB	30-10-1989	Burnley	2014	1	0	Loaned from Burnley on 16 August 2013.
24	Edijs Joksts	(Latvia)	CB	21-07-1992	FK Tukums 2000	2013	0	0	
26	Ellis Plummer	(England)	FB	02-09-1994	Manchester City	2013	3	0	Loaned from Manchester City on 28 November 2013.
30	Joe Cooper	(England)	FB	25-09-1994	Youth Team	2013 (turned pro)	1	0	Loaned to Celtic Nation on 27 August 2013. Resigned on 16 September 2013.
32	Jack Truelove	(England)	FB		Youth Team	2013 (turned pro)	1	0	
34	Tomos Clarke	(Wales)	CB	01-08-1996	Youth Team	Youth Team			
Midfielders
4	James Wesolowski	(Australia)	CM	25-08-1987	Peterborough United	2011	92	5	Contract expired at end of season.
7	Sidney Schmeltz	(Netherlands)	RW	08-06-1989	Unattached	2013	22	1	
7	Terry Dunfield	(Canada)	CM	20-02-1982	Unattached	2014			Signed on 20 February 2014. Contract expired at end of season.
8	Korey Smith	(England)	CM	31-01-1991	Norwich City	2013	37	1	
11	Cristian Montaño	(Colombia)	LW	11-12-1991	West Ham United	2012	48	4	Sacked on 16 December 2013 due to spot-fixing allegations
12	David Mellor	(England)	CM	10-07-1993	Youth Team	2011 (turned pro)	46	1	
15	Carl Winchester	(Northern Ireland)	CM	12-04-1993	Youth Team	2011 (turned pro)	36	2	
17	Anton Rodgers	(Republic of Ireland)	CM	26-01-1993	Unattached	2013	11	0	Signed on 12 July 2013. Contract expired at end of season.
19	James Dayton	(England)	LW	12-12-1988	Kilmarnock	2013	23	3	
20	Mike Petrasso	(Canada)	RW	09-07-1995	QPR	2013	6	1	Loaned from QPR on 22 November 2013.
20	John Paul Kissock	(England)	MF	29-09-1989	Macclesfield Town	2014			Loaned from Macclesfield Town on 30 January 2014.
23	Wade Joyce	(England)	MF	01-05-1994	Barnsley	2013	0	0	Loaned from Barnsley on 28 November 2013.
24	Joel Byrom	(England)	MF	14-09-1986	Preston North End	2014			Loaned from Preston North End on 14 March 2014.
26	Albert Rusnak	(Slovakia)	MF	07-07-1994	Manchester City	2013	3	0	Loaned from Manchester City on 30 August 2013. Returned to Manchester City on 17 September 2013.
28	Chris Sutherland	(England)	RW	04-08-1995	Youth Team	2012 (turned pro)	11	0	Loaned to Barrow on 26 August 2013.
28	David Worrall	(England)	LW	12-06-1990	Rotherham United	2014			Loaned from Rotherham United on 3 January 2014.
30	Gary Harkins	(Scotland)	MF	02-01-1985	St Mirren	2014			Loaned from St Mirren on 3 January 2014.
31	Danny Gosset	(Wales)	CM	21-02-1995	Youth Team	2013 (turned pro)	2	0	Loaned to Stockport County on 29 August 2013.
Forwards
09	Adam Rooney	(Republic of Ireland)	FW	21-04-1988	Birmingham City	2013	25	6	Signed on 1 August 2013. Joined Aberdeen on 23 January.
09	Jon Stead	(England)	FW	07-04-1983	Huddersfield Town	2014			Loaned from Huddersfield Town on 31 January 2014.
10	Charlie MacDonald	(England)	FW	13-02-1981	Unattached	2013	10	4	Signed on 5 July 2013. Contract expired at end of season.
14	Jonson Clarke-Harris	(England)	FW	20-07-1994	Peterborough United	2013	23	3	
20	Jose Baxter	(England)	FW	07-02-1992	Unattached	2012	50	17	Sold to Sheffield United on 29 August 2013.
21	Kirk Millar	(Northern Ireland)	FW	07-07-1992	Youth Team	2010 (turned pro)	38	1	Contract expired at end of season.
23	Rhys Turner	(England)	FW	22-07-1995	Stockport County	2014			Signed on 31 January 2014.
27	Danny Philliskirk	(England)	FW	10-04-1991	Unattached	2013	21	9	Signed on 16 August 2013.
35	Jordan Bove	(England)	FW	12-11-1995	Youth Team	Youth Team	1	0	
36	John Pritchard	(England)	FW	29-09-1995	Youth Team	Youth Team	1	0	

=== Management & Coaching Staff ===
Position	Name	Notes
Manager	Lee Johnson	
Assistant manager	Tommy Wright	Signed on 20 February 2014.
First Team coach	Paul Murray	
Goalkeeping coach	Bobby Mimms	Signed on a short-term contract on 1 July 2013. Left on 17 Feb 2014
Fitness coach	Lee Steele	Signed on a short-term contract on 1 July 2013.
Head of Sports Medicine	Jon Guy	
Head of Youth Development	Tony Philliskirk	

== League table ==
Pos	Team	Pld	W	D	L	GF	GA	GD	Pts
13	Walsall	46	14	16	16	49	49	0	58
14	Crawley Town	46	14	15	17	48	54	−6	57
15	Oldham Athletic	46	14	14	18	50	59	−9	56
16	Colchester United	46	13	14	19	53	61	−8	53
17	Gillingham	46	15	8	23	60	79	−19	53

Updated to match(es) played on 3 May 2014. Source: BBC Sport
Rules for classification: 1) Points; 2) Goal difference; 3) Number of goals scored

== Transfers ==
Players transferred in
Date	Pos.	Name	Previous club	Fee	Ref.
12 May 2013	FW	(England) Jonson Clarke-Harris	(England) Peterborough United	Undisclosed	
20 May 2013	MF	(England) James Dayton	(Scotland) Kilmarnock	Free	
12 June 2013	MF	(Netherlands) Sidney Schmeltz	Unattached	Free	
20 June 2013	MF	(England) Korey Smith	(England) Norwich	Free	
5 July 2013	FW	(England) Charlie MacDonald	Unattached	Free	
12 July 2013	MF	(Republic of Ireland) Anton Rodgers	Unattached	Free	
17 July 2013	DF	(Latvia) Edijs Joksts	(Latvia) FK Tukums 2000	Free	
1 August 2013	FW	(Republic of Ireland) Adam Rooney	(England) Birmingham City	Free	
16 August 2013	FW	(England) Danny Philliskirk	Unattached	Free	
29 August 2013	DF	(Italy) Matteo Lanzoni	Unattached	Free	
2 September 2013	DF	(Angola) Genseric Kusunga	Unattached	Free	
7 September 2013	GK	(United States) Paul Rachubka	Unattached	Free	
3 January 2014	DF	(England) Adam Lockwood	Unattached	Free	
31 January 2014	DF	(England) James Wilson	Bristol City	Free	
31 January 2014	FW	(England) Rhys Turner	Stockport County	Undisclosed	
20 February 2014	MF	(Canada) Terry Dunfield	Unattached	Free	
Players loaned in
Date from	Pos.	Name	From	Date to	Ref.
4 July 2013	GK	(England) Mark Oxley	(England) Hull City	End of season	
16 August 2013	DF	(England) Joseph Mills	(England) Burnley	Three months (Initially for one month)	
30 August 2013	MF	(Slovakia) Albert Rusnak	(England) Manchester City	5 January 2014 (Returned on 17 September 2013)	
22 November 2013	MF	(Canada) Mike Petrasso	(England) QPR	One month	
28 November 2013	DF	(England) Ellis Plummer	(England) Manchester City	One month	
28 November 2013	MF	(England) Wade Joyce	(England) Barnsley	One month	
3 January 2014	MF	(England) David Worrall	(England) Rotherham United	End of season	
3 January 2014	MF	(Scotland) Gary Harkins	(Scotland) St Mirren	End of season	
30 January 2014	MF	(England) John Paul Kissock	(England) Macclesfield Town	End of season	
31 January 2014	FW	(England) Jon Stead	(England) Huddersfield Town	One month	
14 March 2014	DF	(Algeria) Adel Gafaiti	(England) Norwich City	Until 21 April 2014	
14 March 2014	MF	(England) Joel Byrom	(England) Preston North End	End of season	
Players transferred out
Date	Pos.	Name	Subsequent club	Fee	Ref
29 August 2013	FW	(England) Jose Baxter	(England) Sheffield United	Undisclosed	
31 December 2013	DF	(Italy) Matteo Lanzoni	Unattached	Contract expired	
2 January 2014	MF	(England) Chris Sutherland	Unattached	Released	
23 January 2014	FW	(Republic of Ireland) Adam Rooney	Unattached	Released	
30 January 2014	DF	(Latvia) Edijs Joksts	Unattached	Released	
31 January 2014	DF	(England) James Tarkowski	Brentford	Undisclosed	
14 February 2014	MF	(Netherlands) Sidney Schmeltz	Unattached	Released	
Players loaned out
Date from	Pos.	Name	To	Date to	Ref.
17 August 2013	GK	(England) Luke Simpson	(England) Nantwich Town	One month	
23 August 2013	DF	(England) Glenn Belezika	(England) Salisbury City	One month	
26 August 2013	MF	(England) Chris Sutherland	(England) Barrow	One month	
27 August 2013	DF	(England) Joe Cooper	(England) Celtic Nation	One month	
29 August 2013	MF	(Wales) Danny Gosset	(England) Stockport County	Two months (Initially for one month)	
12 September 2013	DF	(Republic of Ireland) Cliff Byrne	(England) Scunthorpe United	Until 13 December 2013	
18 October 2013	DF	(England) Glenn Belezika	(England) Hyde United	One month	
31 January 2014	GK	(England) Luke Simpson	(England) Leicester City	End of season	

== Squad statistics ==
=== Appearances ===
Last updated on 24 November 2013

Number	Position	Name	Tot Apps	Tot Start	Tot Sub	Lg Apps	Lg Start	Lg Sub	FAC Apps	FAC Start	FAC Sub	Lg Cup Apps	Lg Cup Start	Lg Cup Sub	JPT Apps	JPT Start	JPT Sub
01	GK	Mark Oxley	24	24	0	19	19	0	3	3	0	1	1	0	1	1	0
02	DF	Connor Brown	6	5	1	4	4	0	0	0	0	1	1	0	1	0	1
03	DF	Jonathan Grounds	26	26	0	19	19	0	2	2	0	1	1	0	4	4	0
04	MF	James Wesolowski	22	19	3	17	15	2	2	2	0	1	0	1	2	2	0
05	DF	Genseric Kusunga	14	14	0	9	9	0	2	2	0	0	0	0	3	3	0
06	DF	James Tarkowski	25	25	0	17	17	0	3	3	0	1	1	0	4	4	0
07	MF	Sidney Schmeltz	22	8	14	16	5	11	2	1	1	1	0	1	3	2	1
08	MF	Korey Smith	27	27	0	19	19	0	3	3	0	1	1	0	4	4	0
09	FW	Adam Rooney	25	17	8	18	12	6	3	2	1	1	1	0	3	2	1
10	FW	Charlie MacDonald	10	7	3	10	7	3	0	0	0	0	0	0	0	0	0
11	MF	Cristian Montaño	15	9	6	10	6	4	2	1	1	1	1	0	2	1	1
12	MF	David Mellor	15	11	4	9	7	2	3	2	1	1	1	0	3	1	2
14	FW	Jonson Clarke-Harris	23	12	11	16	7	9	3	2	1	1	1	0	3	2	1
15	MF	Carl Winchester	5	3	2	5	3	2	0	0	0	0	0	0	0	0	0
16	DF	Cliff Byrne	3	0	3	3	0	3	0	0	0	0	0	0	0	0	0
17	MF	Anton Rodgers	11	6	5	6	2	4	2	2	0	0	0	0	3	2	1
18	DF	Matteo Lanzoni	12	11	1	8	8	0	2	1	1	0	0	0	2	2	0
19	MF	James Dayton	23	23	0	17	17	0	3	3	0	1	1	0	2	2	0
20	FW	Jose Baxter	5	4	1	4	3	1	0	0	0	1	1	0	0	0	0
20	FW	Mike Petrasso	6	4	2	4	3	1	1	0	1	0	0	0	1	1	0
21	FW	Kirk Millar	8	2	6	5	2	3	1	0	1	1	0	1	1	0	1
22	DF	Glenn Belezika	1	0	1	0	0	0	0	0	0	0	0	0	1	0	1
23	DF	Joseph Mills	14	14	0	11	11	0	0	0	0	0	0	0	3	3	0
24	DF	Edijs Joksts	0	0	0	0	0	0	0	0	0	0	0	0	0	0	0
25	GK	Luke Simpson	0	0	0	0	0	0	0	0	0	0	0	0	0	0	0
26	MF	Albert Rusnak	3	1	2	2	0	2	0	0	0	0	0	0	1	1	0
26	DF	Ellis Plummer	3	3	0	2	2	0	1	1	0	0	0	0	0	0	0
27	FW	Danny Philliskirk	21	19	2	14	12	2	3	3	0	0	0	0	4	4	0
28	MF	Chris Sutherland	0	0	0	0	0	0	0	0	0	0	0	0	0	0	0
29	GK	Paul Rachubka	3	3	0	0	0	0	0	0	0	0	0	0	3	3	0
30	DF	Joe Cooper	0	0	0	0	0	0	0	0	0	0	0	0	0	0	0
31	MF	Danny Gosset	0	0	0	0	0	0	0	0	0	0	0	0	0	0	0
32	DF	Jack Truelove	0	0	0	0	0	0	0	0	0	0	0	0	0	0	0
33	GK	Joel Coleman	0	0	0	0	0	0	0	0	0	0	0	0	0	0	0
35	FW	Jordan Bove	1	0	1	0	0	0	0	0	0	0	0	0	1	0	1

=== Goal Scorers ===
Last updated on 15 December 2013

Rank	Pos	No.	Player	Total	League One	FA Cup	League Cup	Johnstone's Paint Trophy
1	FW	27	(England) Danny Philliskirk	9	2	1	0	6
2	FW	9	(Republic of Ireland) Adam Rooney	6	4	1	0	1
3	FW	10	(England) Charlie MacDonald	4	4	0	0	0
4	FW	14	(England) Jonson Clarke-Harris	3	2	0	0	1
4	MF	19	(England) James Dayton	3	2	0	0	1
4	DF	6	(England) James Tarkowski	3	2	0	0	1
5	FW	20	(England) Jose Baxter	2	2	0	0	0
5	MF	11	(Colombia) Cristian Montaño	2	2	0	0	0
6	DF	5	(Angola) Genseric Kusunga	1	0	1	0	0
6	DF	18	(Italy) Matteo Lanzoni	1	1	0	0	0
6	MF	20	(Canada) Mike Petrasso	1	1	0	0	0
6	MF	7	(Netherlands) Sidney Schmeltz	1	0	0	0	1
6	MF	4	(England) Korey Smith	1	0	1	0	0
6	MF	4	(Australia) James Wesolowski	1	0	0	0	1
6	MF	15	(Northern Ireland) Carl Winchester	1	1	0	0	0
TOTALS				39	23	4	0	12

=== Disciplinary ===
Last updated on 15 December 2013

Rank	Pos.	No.	Player	Total		League One		FA Cup		League Cup		Johnstone's Paint Trophy	
Rank	Pos.	No.	Player	Booked	Sent off (straight red)	Booked	Sent off (straight red)	Booked	Sent off (straight red)	Booked	Sent off (straight red)	Booked	Sent off (straight red)
1	DF	6	(England) James Tarkowski	6	0	5	0	0	0	0	0	1	0
2	DF	3	(England) Jonathan Grounds	4	0	2	0	0	0	1	0	1	0
2	MF	11	(Colombia) Cristian Montaño	4	0	2	0	0	0	1	0	1	0
2	MF	4	(Australia) James Wesolowski	4	0	2	0	1	0	0	0	1	0
3	FW	14	(England) Jonson Clarke-Harris	3	0	2	0	0	0	0	0	1	0
3	DF	5	(Angola) Genseric Kusunga	2	1	1	1	0	0	0	0	1	0
3	DF	12	(England) David Mellor	2	1	2	1	0	0	0	0	0	0
3	MF	8	(England) Korey Smith	3	0	1	0	1	0	0	0	1	0
4	FW	20	(England) Jose Baxter	2	0	1	0	0	0	1	0	0	0
4	DF	2	(England) Connor Brown	2	0	2	0	0	0	0	0	0	0
4	MF	19	(England) James Dayton	2	0	1	0	1	0	0	0	0	0
4	DF	18	(Italy) Matteo Lanzoni	2	0	2	0	0	0	0	0	0	0
4	GK	1	(England) Mark Oxley	2	0	2	0	0	0	0	0	0	0
4	DF	26	(England) Ellis Plummer	2	0	2	0	0	0	0	0	0	0
4	MF	17	(Republic of Ireland) Anton Rodgers	2	0	1	0	1	0	0	0	0	0
5	FW	35	(England) Jordan Bove	0	1	0	0	0	0	0	0	0	1
5	FW	10	(England) Charlie MacDonald	1	0	1	0	0	0	0	0	0	0
5	DF	23	(England) Joseph Mills	1	0	0	0	0	0	0	0	1	0
5	MF	7	(Netherlands) Sidney Schmeltz	1	0	0	0	1	0	0	0	0	0
TOTALS				45	3	29	2	5	0	3	0	8	1

== Results and fixtures ==
=== Pre–season friendlies ===
5 July 2013	Oldham Athletic	2–2	Dinamo Bucharest	Leigh Sports Village
20:00	Baxter 19' (pen.); MacDonald 68'	First Half Report; Second Half Report	Rus 29'; Alexe 60'

15 July 2013	Curzon Ashton	0–2	Oldham Athletic	Tameside Stadium
19:00		First Half Report; Second Half Report	Schmeltz 12'; Hampson 37' (o.g.)	Attendance: 1,009; Referee: Paul Graham

20 July 2013	Oldham Athletic	4–1	Macclesfield Town	Boundary Park
15:00	Rooney 50' (pen.); Montaño 53', 61'; Taylor 90' (o.g.)	First Half Report; Second Half Report	Boden 34'	Attendance: 1,049; Referee: Scott Mathieson

23 July 2013	Accrington Stanley	1–1	Oldham Athletic	Crown Ground
19:45	Clark 12'	First Half Report; Second Half Report	Baxter 42'

27 July 2013	Oldham Athletic	3–2	Huddersfield Town	Boundary Park
15:00	Baxter 25' (pen.); Montaño 71', 76'	Report	Lopez 64'; Paterson 67'	Attendance: 1,661

=== League One ===
3 August 2013 1	Stevenage	3–4	Oldham Athletic	Broadhall Way
15:00	Charles 45'; Tansey 76'; Morais 84'	Report	Tarkowski 50'; Baxter 67', 86' (pen.); Montaño 70'	Attendance: 3,009; Referee: Darren Sheldrake

10 August 2013 2	Oldham Athletic	0–1	Walsall	Boundary Park
15:00		Report	Baxendale 25'	Attendance: 4,538; Referee: Gary Sutton

17 August 2013 3	Peterborough United	2–1	Oldham Athletic	London Road
15:00	Assombalonga 34'; Tomlin 84' (pen.)	Report	MacDonald 90'	Attendance: 6,184; Referee: Tony Harrington

24 August 2013 4	Oldham Athletic	3–1	Port Vale	Boundary Park
15:00	Rooney 15', 57'; Dayton 77'	Report	Myrie–Williams 31'	Attendance: 4,788; Referee: Chris Sarginson

31 August 2013 5	Oldham Athletic	0–1	Tranmere Rovers	Boundary Park
15:00		Report	Lowe 90' (pen.)	Attendance: 4,792; Referee: Eddie Ilderton

9 September 2013 6	Preston North End	2–1	Oldham Athletic	Deepdale
19:35	Beavon 13'; Davies 38' (pen.)	Report	Tarkowski 83'	Attendance: 10,292; Referee: Michael Naylor

14 September 2013 7	Rotherham United	3–2	Oldham Athletic	New York Stadium
15:00	Nardiello 21' (pen.); Frecklington 63'	Report	Montaño 44'; Lanzoni 53'	Attendance: 8,306; Referee: Richard Clark

21 September 2013 8	Oldham Athletic	1–1	Crewe Alexandra	Boundary Park
15:00	MacDonald 54'	Report	Turton 13'	Attendance: 4,273; Referee: Carl Boyeson

28 September 2013 9	Crawley Town	1–0	Oldham Athletic	Broadfield Stadium
15:00	Walsh 7'	Report		Attendance: 3,142; Referee: Andy Davies

5 October 2013 10	Oldham Athletic	1–1	Leyton Orient	Boundary Park
15:00	MacDonald 36'	Report	Batt 66'	Attendance: 4,062; Referee: Kevin Wright

19 October 2013 11	Oldham Athletic	1–0	Carlisle United	Boundary Park
15:00	Rooney 26' (pen.)	Report		Attendance: 4,478; Referee: Mark Heywood

22 October 2013 12	Wolverhampton Wanderers	2–0	Oldham Athletic	Molineux
19:45	Henry 50'; Griffiths 66'	Report		Attendance: 15,959; Referee: Mark Haywood

26 October 2013 13	Oldham Athletic	2–1	Swindon Town	Boundary Park
15:00	Winchester 32'; Philliskirk 77'	Report	Tarkowski 56' (o.g.)	Attendance: 3,837; Referee: Jeremy Simpson

29 October 2013 14	Notts County	3–2	Oldham Athletic	Meadow Lane
19:45	Haynes 20'; Arquin 60'; McGregor 68'	Report	Rooney 45'; Clarke–Harris 70'	Attendance: 3,385; Referee: Gavin Ward

2 November 2013 15	Bristol City	1–1	Oldham Athletic	Ashton Gate
15:00	Emmanuel–Thomas 36'	Report	Dayton 77'	Attendance: 11,352; Referee: Andy Madley

23 November 2013 16	Gillingham	0–1	Oldham Athletic	Priestfield Stadium
15:00		Report	Petrasso 57'	Attendance: 6,025; Referee: Graham Scott

26 November 2013 17	Shrewsbury Town	1–2	Oldham Athletic	New Meadow
19:45	Ugwu 16'	Report	MacDonald 44'; Philliskirk 76'	Attendance: 4,563; Referee: James Adcock

1 December 2013 18	Oldham Athletic	1–1	Bradford City	Boundary Park
15:00	Clarke–Harris 23'	Report	Wells 21'	Attendance: 7,180; Referee: David Webb

14 December 2013 19	Brentford	1–0	Oldham Athletic	Griffin Park
15:00	Douglas 90'	Report		Attendance: 6,594; Referee: Carl Berry

21 December 2013 20	Oldham Athletic	0–2	Colchester United	Boundary Park
15:00

26 December 2013 21	Sheffield United	1–1	Oldham Athletic	Bramall Lane
15:00

29 December 2013 22	Coventry City	1–1	Oldham Athletic	Sixfields Stadium
15:00

1 January 2014 23	Oldham Athletic	1–2	Shrewsbury Town	Boundary Park
15:00

11 January 2014 24	Oldham Athletic	1–0	Stevenage	Boundary Park
15:00

14 January 2014 25	Walsall	1–0	Oldham Athletic	Bescot Stadium

18 January 2014 26	Port Vale	1–0	Oldham Athletic	Vale Park
15:00

25 January 2014 27	Oldham Athletic	5–4	Peterborough United	Boundary Park
15:00

28 January 2014 28	Oldham Athletic	0–3	Wolverhampton Wanderers	Boundary Park
19:45

1 February 2014 29	Swindon Town	0–1	Oldham Athletic	County Ground
15:00

8 February 2014 30	Oldham Athletic	1–1	Bristol City	Boundary Park
15:00

15 February 2014 31	MK Dons	1–2	Oldham Athletic	Stadium mk
15:00

22 February 2014 32	Oldham Athletic	1–0	Gillingham	Boundary Park
15:00

25 February 2013 33	Oldham Athletic	1–2	MK Dons	Boundary Park

1 March 2014 34	Tranmere Rovers	2–2	Oldham Athletic	Prenton Park
15:00

8 March 2014 35	Oldham Athletic	1–3	Preston North End	Boundary Park
15:00

11 March 2014 36	Oldham Athletic	0–2	Rotherham United	Boundary Park
19:45

15 March 2014 37	Crewe Alexandra	1–1	Oldham Athletic	Alexandra Stadium
15:00

22 March 2014 38	Oldham Athletic	1–0	Crawley Town	Boundary Park
15:00

25 March 2014 39	Leyton Orient	1–1	Oldham Athletic	Matchroom Stadium
19:45

29 March 2014 40	Oldham Athletic	0–0	Brentford	Boundary Park
15:00

5 April 2014 41	Bradford City	2–3	Oldham Athletic	Valley Parade
15:00

18 April 2014 42	Colchester United	0–1	Oldham Athletic	Colchester Community Stadium
15:00

21 April 2014 43	Oldham Athletic	0–0	Coventry City	Boundary Park
15:00

26 April 2014 44	Carlisle United	0–1	Oldham Athletic	Brunton Park
15:00			Dayton 70'	Attendance: 5,313

29 April 2014 45	Oldham Athletic	1–1	Sheffield United	Boundary Park
15:00	Wilson 17'		Porter 84'	Attendance: 3,939

3 May 2014 46	Oldham Athletic	1–1	Notts County	Boundary Park
15:00	Lockwood 68'		Sheehan 75'	Attendance: 7,698

=== FA Cup ===
9 November 2013 First round	Oldham Athletic	1–1	Wolverhampton Wanderers	Boundary Park
15:00	Kusunga 2'	Report	Golbourne 37'	Attendance: 3,916; Referee: Geoff Eltringham

19 November 2013 First round (R)	Wolverhampton Wanderers	1–2	Oldham Athletic	Molineux
19:45	Griffiths 90'	Report	Philliskirk 21'; Rooney 73'	Attendance: 4,226; Referee: Keith Stroud

7 December 2013 Second round	Oldham Athletic	1–1	Mansfield Town	Boundary Park
15:00	Smith 28'	Report	Clucas 45'	Attendance: 3,916; Referee: Iain Williamson

17 December 2013 Second round (R)	Mansfield Town	1–4	Oldham Athletic	Field Mill
19:45

17 December 2013 Third Round	Liverpool	2–0	Oldham Athletic	Anfield
19:45

=== League Cup ===
6 August 2013 First round	Oldham Athletic	0–1	Derby County	Boundary Park
19:45		Report	Jacobs 20'	Attendance: 5,000; Referee: Rob Lewis

=== Football League Trophy ===
3 September 2013 First Round (N)	Shrewsbury Town	1–4	Oldham Athletic	New Meadow
19:30	Burke 45'	Report	Philliskirk 9', 26'; Rooney 42'; Schmeltz 76'	Attendance: 1,748; Referee: Seb Stockbridge

8 October 2013 Second Round (N)	Preston North End	0–2	Oldham Athletic	Deepdale
19:45		Report	Philliskirk 1'; Wesolowski 9'	Attendance: 5,987; Referee: Oliver Langford

12 November 2013 Quarter Final (N)	Oldham Athletic	5–1	Notts County	Boundary Park
19:45	James Tarkowski 30'; Philliskirk 45', 84'; Dayton 67'; Clarke–Harris 90'	Report	Murray 13'	Attendance: 2,646; Referee: Andy Haines

10 December 2013 Semi Final (N)	Oldham Athletic	1–1 (5–6 p)	Chesterfield	Boundary Park
19:45	Philliskirk 21'	Report	Darikwa 28'	Attendance: 3,534; Referee: Kevin Wright
	Penalties
	Rooney (penalty scored); Philliskirk (penalty missed); Clarke–Harris (penalty scored); Tarkowski (penalty scored); Smith (penalty scored); Grounds (penalty scored); Rodgers (penalty missed)		(penalty scored) Richards; (penalty scored) Doyle; (penalty scored) Ryan; (penalty missed) Banks; (penalty scored) McSheffrey; (penalty scored) Darikwa; (penalty scored) Talbot
