= 2012–13 Oldham Athletic A.F.C. season =

Oldham Athletic A.F.C.
2012–13 season
- Chairman: Simon Corney
- Manager: Paul Dickov (to 3 February 2013); Tony Philliskirk (caretaker) (from 3 February 2013 to 18 March 2013); Lee Johnson (from 18 March 2013)
- League One: 19th
- FA Cup: 5th Round
- League Cup: 1st Round
- Football League Trophy: 1st Round (Northern)
- Top goalscorer: League: Jose Baxter (13 goals); All: Jose Baxter (15 goals)
- Highest home attendance: 10,295 (27 January vs Liverpool)
- Lowest home attendance: 2,969 (18 September vs Scunthorpe United)
Home colours	Away colours

The 2012–13 season was Oldham Athletic's 16th consecutive season in the third division of the English football league system. It was Paul Dickov's third season as manager of the club. Oldham began inconsistently in the league before a poor run of form before Christmas 2012 led to Dickov's coaching team being placed on gardening leave. Victories over Nottingham Forest and Liverpool in the FA Cup followed but after a run of one point from nine games, Dickov resigned as manager on 3 February 2013.

Tony Philliskirk took over as caretaker manager and Matt Smith's last minute equaliser earned Philliskirk's men an FA Cup fifth round replay against Everton which Everton ultimately won 3–1. It was the furthest that the Latics had progressed in the FA Cup since reaching the semi-final in 1994.

Lee Johnson was appointed as Oldham's new manager on 18 March 2013, becoming the youngest manager in the Football League at only 31 years of age. Johnson led Oldham to safety with two games to spare with four wins, three draws and three defeats from the last ten games. Oldham finished the season in 19th position and with many of his first team squad out of contract, Johnson faced a summer of rebuilding in preparation for the 2013-14 season.

== Squad & Coaching Staff ==
=== First Team Squad ===
Includes all players who were awarded a squad number during the season. Last updated on 7 July 2013
*Total appearances and goals as at the end of the 2012-13 season

Squad No.	Name	Nat.	Position	Date of birth	Signed from	Signed in	Total Apps*	Total Goals*	Notes
Goalkeepers
1	Alex Cisak	(Poland)	GK	19-05-1989	Accrington Stanley	2011	59	0	On loan to Portsmouth in November.
13	Dean Bouzanis	(Australia)	GK	02-10-90	Unattached	2011	51	0	
25	Liam Jacob	(Australia)	GK	18-08-1994	Unattached	2012	1	0	
Defenders
2	Connor Brown	(England)	RB	02-10-1991	Unattached	2012	29	0	
3	Jonathan Grounds	(England)	LB	02-02-1988	Unattached	2012	52	1	
5	Jean-Yves Mvoto	(France)	CB	06-09-1988	Sunderland	2011	123	8	
6	James Tarkowski	(England)	CB	19-11-1992	Youth Team	2011 (turned pro)	53	3	
16	Cliff Byrne	(Republic of Ireland)	CB	26-04-1982	Unattached	2012	40	1	
23	Reece Wabara	(England)	FB/CB	28-12-1991	Manchester City	2012 (loan)	29	2	On loan from September to January.
27	Glenn Belezika	(England)	CB	24-12-1994	Youth Team	2012 (turned pro)	4	0	
30	Joe Cooper	(England)	FB	25-09-1994	Youth Team	Youth Team	1	0	
33	Jack Truelove	(England)	FB		Youth Team	Youth Team	1	0	
Midfielders
4	James Wesolowski	(Australia)	CM	25-08-1987	Peterborough United	2011	70	4	
7	Lee Croft	(England)	RW	21-06-1985	Derby County	2012 (loan)	69	2	On loan until January, signed on contract from January.
8	Dean Furman	(England)	CM	22-06-1988	Rangers	2009	148	9	On loan to Doncaster from March.
11	Cristian Montaño	(Colombia)	LW	11-12-1991	West Ham United	2012	33	2	
15	Jordan Obita	(England)	LW	08-12-1993	Reading	2013 (loan)	10	1	On loan from January.
17	Paul Murray	(England)	CM	31-08-1976	Unattached	2013			Signed in January.
21	Kirk Millar	(Northern Ireland)	RW	07-07-1992	Youth Team	2010 (turned pro)	30	1	On loan to Chorley in October.
22	Youssouf M'Changama	(Comoros)	CM	29-08-1990	Unattached	2012	30	2	Released in March.
22	Bobby Reid	(England)	CM	02-02-1993	Bristol City	2013 (loan)	7	0	On loan from March.
23	Korey Smith	(England)	CM	31-01-1991	Norwich City	2013	10	0	On loan from March.
24	Connor Hughes	(England)	RW	06-05-1993	Youth Team	2011 (turned pro)	10	0	
26	Carl Winchester	(Northern Ireland)	CM	12-04-1993	Youth Team	2011 (turned pro)	31	1	
28	Chris Sutherland	(England)	RW	04-08-1995	Youth Team	2012 (turned pro)	11	0	
29	David Mellor	(England)	CM	10-07-1993	Youth Team	2011 (turned pro)	31	1	
31	Danny Gosset	(England)	CM	21-02-95	Youth Team	Youth Team	2	0	
Forwards
9	Jordan Slew	(England)	FW	07-09-1992	Blackburn Rovers	2012 (loan)	4	1	On loan until September.
9	Matt Derbyshire	(England)	FW	14-04-1986	Nottingham Forest	2012 (loan)	20	6	On loan from September to December.
9	Chris Iwelumo	(England)	FW	01-08-1978	Watford	2013 (loan)	9	1	On loan from January.
10	Robbie Simpson	(England)	FW	15-03-1985	Huddersfield Town	2012	80	13	
14	Matt Smith	(England)	FW	07-06-1989	Solihull Moors	2011	75	14	
18	Lee Barnard	(England)	FW	18-07-1984	Southampton	2013 (loan)	16	3	On loan from January.
19	Dan Taylor	(England)	FW	17-03-1993	Unattached	2012	10	1	
20	Jose Baxter	(England)	FW	07-02-1992	Unattached	2012	45	15	Signed in September.

=== Management & Coaching Staff ===
Position	Name	Notes
Manager	Paul Dickov	Until February.
Manager (caretaker)	Tony Philliskirk	February to March.
Manager	Lee Johnson	From March.
Assistant manager	Gerry Taggart	Until December.
First Team coach	Lee Duxbury	Until December.
Goalkeeping coach	Paul Gerrard	
Fitness coach	Paul Butler	Until December.
Head of Sports Medicine	Jon Guy	
Academy Manager	Tony Philliskirk	
Centre of Excellence Manager	Mick Priest	
Youth Team Therapist	Anthony Gray	
Chief Youth Scout	Ron Millward	

== League table ==
Pos	Team	Pld	W	D	L	GF	GA	GD	Pts	Promotion, qualification or relegation
17	Carlisle United	46	14	13	19	56	77	−21	55	
18	Stevenage	46	15	9	22	47	64	−17	54	
19	Oldham Athletic	46	14	9	23	46	59	−13	51	
20	Colchester United	46	14	9	23	47	68	−21	51	
21	Scunthorpe United (R)	46	13	9	24	49	73	−24	48	Relegation to Football League Two

Updated to match(es) played on 27 April 2013. Source: BBC Sport
Rules for classification: 1) Points; 2) Goal difference; 3) Number of goals scored
(R) Relegated

== Squad statistics ==
=== Appearances ===
Number	Position	Name	Tot Apps	Tot Start	Tot Sub	Lg Apps	Lg Start	Lg Sub	FAC Apps	FAC Start	FAC Sub	Lg Cup Apps	Lg Cup Start	Lg Cup Sub	JPT Apps	JPT Start	JPT Sub
01	GK	Alex Cisak	12	12	0	10	10	0	1	1	0	1	1	0	0	0	0
02	DF	Connor Brown	29	23	6	25	20	5	4	3	1	0	0	0	0	0	0
03	DF	Jonathan Grounds	52	52	0	44	44	0	6	6	0	1	1	0	1	1	0
04	MF	James Wesolowski	39	37	2	33	32	1	5	4	1	1	1	0	0	0	0
05	DF	Jean-Yves Mvoto	49	49	0	42	42	0	5	5	0	1	1	0	1	1	0
06	DF	James Tarkowski	26	22	4	21	17	4	3	3	0	1	1	0	1	1	0
07	MF	Lee Croft	53	52	1	45	44	1	6	6	0	1	1	0	1	1	0
08	MF	Dean Furman	34	28	6	28	24	4	5	3	2	1	1	0	0	0	0
09	FW	Jordan Slew	4	4	0	3	3	0	0	0	0	1	1	0	0	0	0
09	FW	Matt Derbyshire	20	20	0	18	18	0	2	2	0	0	0	0	0	0	0
09	FW	Chris Iwelumo	9	6	3	7	4	3	2	2	0	0	0	0	0	0	0
10	MF	Robbie Simpson	44	28	16	37	23	14	5	3	2	1	1	0	1	1	0
11	MF	Cristian Montaño	33	28	5	30	25	5	2	2	0	0	0	0	1	1	0
13	GK	Dean Bouzanis	42	42	0	36	36	0	5	5	0	0	0	0	1	1	0
14	FW	Matt Smith	40	17	23	34	14	20	4	2	2	1	0	1	1	1	0
15	MF	Jordan Obita	10	6	4	8	4	4	2	2	0	0	0	0	0	0	0
16	DF	Cliff Byrne	40	37	3	35	32	3	3	3	0	1	1	0	1	1	0
18	FW	Lee Barnard	16	16	0	14	14	0	2	2	0	0	0	0	0	0	0
19	FW	Dan Taylor	10	1	9	8	1	7	2	0	2	0	0	0	0	0	0
20	FW	Jose Baxter	45	40	5	39	34	5	6	6	0	0	0	0	0	0	0
21	MF	Kirk Millar	14	2	12	12	2	10	1	0	1	0	0	0	1	0	1
22	MF	Youssouf M'Changama	20	14	6	16	10	6	2	2	0	1	1	0	1	1	0
22	MF	Bobby Reid	7	3	4	7	3	4	0	0	0	0	0	0	0	0	0
23	DF	Reece Wabara	29	29	0	25	25	0	4	4	0	0	0	0	0	0	0
23	MF	Korey Smith	10	9	1	10	9	1	0	0	0	0	0	0	0	0	0
24	MF	Connor Hughes	6	0	6	4	0	4	0	0	0	1	0	1	1	0	1
25	GK	Liam Jacob	1	0	1	1	0	1	0	0	0	0	0	0	0	0	0
26	MF	Carl Winchester	11	7	4	9	6	3	1	0	1	0	0	0	1	1	0
27	DF	Glenn Belezika	3	3	0	3	3	0	0	0	0	0	0	0	0	0	0
28	MF	Chris Sutherland	11	1	10	10	1	9	1	0	1	0	0	0	0	0	0
29	MF	David Mellor	7	4	3	5	4	1	1	0	1	0	0	0	1	0	1
30	DF	Joe Cooper	1	1	0	1	1	0	0	0	0	0	0	0	0	0	0
31	MF	Danny Gosset	2	1	1	2	1	1	0	0	0	0	0	0	0	0	0
33	DF	Jack Truelove	1	0	1	1	0	1	0	0	0	0	0	0	0	0	0

=== Top scorers ===
Place	Position	Nation	Name	League One	FA Cup	League Cup	JP Trophy	Total
1	FW	(England)	Jose Baxter	13	2	0	0	15
2	FW	(England)	Matt Smith	6	4	0	1	11
3	FW	(England)	Matt Derbyshire	4	2	0	0	6
4	DF	(France)	Jean-Yves Mvoto	4	0	1	0	5
5	FW	(England)	Robbie Simpson	2	2	0	0	4
6	FW	(England)	Lee Barnard	3	0	0	0	3
7	MF	(Comoros)	Youssouf M'Changama	2	0	0	0	2
7	MF	(South Africa)	Dean Furman	2	0	0	0	2
7	DF	(England)	James Tarkowski	2	0	0	0	2
7	n/a	n/a	Own Goals	2	0	0	0	2
7	MF	(Colombia)	Cristian Montaño	1	1	0	0	2
7	DF	(England)	Reece Wabara	0	2	0	0	2
8	DF	(Republic of Ireland)	Cliff Byrne	1	0	0	0	1
8	DF	(England)	Jonathan Grounds	1	0	0	0	1
8	FW	(England)	Chris Iwelumo	1	0	0	0	1
8	MF	(Northern Ireland)	Kirk Millar	1	0	0	0	1
8	FW	(England)	Daniel Taylor	1	0	0	0	1
8	FW	(England)	Jordan Obita	0	1	0	0	1
8	FW	(England)	Jordan Slew	0	0	1	0	1
			TOTALS	46	14	2	1	63

== Transfers ==
Players transferred in
Date	Pos.	Name	Previous club	Fee	Ref.
8 June 2012	DF	(England) Connor Brown	Unattached	Free	
18 June 2012	FW	(England) Dan Taylor	Unattached	Free	
27 June 2012	GK	(Australia) Liam Jacob	Unattached	Free	
2 July 2012	DF	(England) Jonathan Grounds	Unattached	Free	
27 July 2012	DF	(Republic of Ireland) Cliff Byrne	Unattached	Free	
17 August 2012	MF	(Colombia) Cristian Montaño	West Ham United	Undisclosed	
14 September 2012	FW	(England) Jose Baxter	Unattached	Free	
29 January 2013	MF	(England) Paul Murray	Unattached	Free	
12 June 2013	MF	(Netherlands) Sidney Schmeltz	Unattached	Free	
Players transferred out
Date	Pos.	Name	To	Fee	Ref.
7 May 2012	FW	(England) Ryan Brooke	Released	Free	
7 May 2012	MF	(Democratic Republic of the Congo) Djeny Bembo-Leta	Released	Free	
7 May 2012	DF	(England) Matthew D Carr	Released	Free	
7 May 2012	MF	(England) Keanu Marsh-Brown	Released	Free	
7 May 2012	MF	(Northern Ireland) Phillip McGrath	Released	Free	
7 May 2012	MF	(Antigua and Barbuda) Josh Parker	Released	Free	
7 May 2012	FW	(England) Reuben Reid	Released	Free	
28 May 2012	DF	(England) Kieran Lee	Sheffield Wednesday	Free	
15 June 2012	MF	(England) Chris Taylor	Millwall	Free	
2 July 2012	FW	(Finland) Shefki Kuqi	Released	Free	
2 July 2012	MF	(Portugal) Filipe Morais	Released	Free	
15 March 2013	MF	(Comoros) Youssouf M'Changama	Released	Free	
1 May 2013	GK	(Australia) Dean Bouzanis	Released	Free	
1 May 2013	GK	(Australia) Liam Jacob	Released	Free	
1 May 2013	MF	(England) Connor Hughes	Released	Free	
1 May 2013	FW	(England) Robbie Simpson	Released	Free	
1 May 2013	GK	(England) Dan Taylor	Released	Free	
24 May 2013	MF	(England) Lee Croft	Released	Free	
Players loaned in
Date from	Pos.	Name	From	Date to	Ref.
4 July 2012	MF	(England) Lee Croft	Derby County	End of season	
8 August 2012	FW	(England) Jordan Slew	Blackburn Rovers	Six months (Recalled 14 September 2012 due to injury)	
14 September 2012	FW	(England) Matt Derbyshire	Nottingham Forest	15 December 2012 (Initially for 6 weeks)	
15 September 2012	DF	(England) Reece Wabara	Manchester City	28 January 2013 (Initially for 1 month)	
31 January 2013	MF	(England) Jordan Obita	Reading	1 April 2013 (Initially for 1 month)	
31 January 2013	FW	(England) Lee Barnard	Southampton	End of season	
31 January 2013	FW	(Scotland) Chris Iwelumo	Watford	End of season	
15 March 2013	MF	(England) Korey Smith	Norwich City	15 April 2013	
Players loaned out
Date from	Pos.	Name	To	Date to	Ref.
14 March 2013	MF	(South Africa) Dean Furman	Doncaster Rovers	End of season	

== Results and fixtures ==
=== Pre-season friendlies ===
11 July 2012	Mossley	0–3	Oldham Athletic	Seel Park
19:00			Simpson 14' (pen.); Smith 47'; M'Changama 90'

18 July 2012	Rotherham United	3–1	Oldham Athletic	Vilamoura, Loulé
10:30	Taylor 10'; Revell 55'; Nardiello 71'	Report	M'Changama 75'

21 July 2012	York City	0–2	Oldham Athletic	Bootham Crescent
15:00			Tarkowski; Simpson

27 July 2012	Fleetwood Town	1–3	Oldham Athletic	Highbury Stadium
19:30	Mangan 62'		Furman 17', 27'; Simpson 31'

31 July 2012	Oldham Athletic	2–1	Manchester City	Boundary Park
19:45	Simpson; Grounds		Santa Cruz

4 August 2012	Oldham Athletic	0–0	Huddersfield Town	Boundary Park
15:00

=== League One ===
18 August 2012 1	Milton Keynes Dons	2–0	Oldham Athletic	Stadium mk
15:00 BST	Potter 34'; Powell 59'	Report		Attendance: 7,409; Referee: Iain Williamson (Berkshire)

21 August 2012 2	Oldham Athletic	1–1	Walsall	Boundary Park
19:45 BST	M'Changama 36'	Report	Bowerman 79'	Attendance: 3,496; Referee: Mark Brown (East Yorkshire)

25 August 2012 3	Oldham Athletic	0–1	Stevenage	Boundary Park
15:00 BST		Report	Akins 33' (pen.)	Attendance: 3,142; Referee: Michael Naylor (South Yorkshire)

1 September 2012 4	Portsmouth	0–1	Oldham Athletic	Fratton Park
15:00 BST	Obita (red card) 62'	Report	Grounds 59'; Byrne (red card) 63'	Attendance: 12,635; Referee: Carl Berry (Surrey)

8 September 2012 Postponed (International call ups)	Doncaster Rovers	P-P	Oldham Athletic	Keepmoat Stadium
15:00 BST

15 September 2012 5	Oldham Athletic	2–2	Notts County	Boundary Park
15:00 BST	Derbyshire 49'; Baxter 85'	Report	Labadie 46'; Campbell-Ryce 82'; Boucard (red card) 22'	Attendance: 4,039; Referee: Chris Sarginson (Staffordshire)

18 September 2012 6	Oldham Athletic	1-1	Scunthorpe United	Boundary Park
19:45 BST	Derbyshire 40'	Report	Clarke 3'	Attendance: 2,969; Referee: Geoff Eltringham (Sunderland)

22 September 2012 7	Brentford	1–0	Oldham Athletic	Griffin Park
15:00 BST	Forshaw 17'	Report		Attendance: 5,251; Referee: Fred Graham (Essex)

29 September 2012 8	Oldham Athletic	0–1	Coventry City	Boundary Park
15:00 BST		Report	McDonald 89'	Attendance: 4,022; Referee: David Coote (Nottinghamshire)

2 October 2012 9	Crewe Alexandra	0–2	Oldham Athletic	Alexandra Stadium
19:45 BST		Report	Tarkowski 61'; Derbyshire 79'	Attendance: 3,935; Referee: Mark Haywood (West Riding)

6 October 2012 10	Oldham Athletic	3–1	Preston North End	Boundary Park
15:00 BST	Baxter 27'; Montaño 57'; Furman 69'	Report	Sodje 90'	Attendance: 5,496; Referee: Paul Tierney (Lancashire)

13 October 2012 11	Sheffield United	1–1	Oldham Athletic	Bramall Lane
15:00 BST		Report		Attendance: 18,188

20 October 2012 12	Oldham Athletic	2–0	Leyton Orient	Boundary Park
15:00 BST		Report		Attendance: 3,919

23 October 2012 13	Carlisle United	3–1	Oldham Athletic	Brunton Park
19:45 BST		Report		Attendance: 3,310

27 October 2012 14	Crawley Town	1–1	Oldham Athletic	Broadfield Stadium
15:00 BST		Report		Attendance: 3,375

6 November 2012 15	Oldham Athletic	1–2	Bury	Boundary Park
19:45 BST		Report		Attendance: 4,120

10 November 2012 16	Oldham Athletic	0–1	Tranmere Rovers	Boundary Park
15:00 BST		Report		Attendance: 5,159

17 November 2012 17	Bournemouth	4–1	Oldham Athletic	Dean Court
15:00 BST		Report		Attendance: 6,118

20 November 2012 18	Hartlepool United	1–2	Oldham Athletic	Victoria Park
19:45 BST		Report		Attendance: 3,078

24 November 2012 19	Oldham Athletic	1–0	Shrewsbury Town	Boundary Park
15:00 BST		Report		Attendance: 3,886

27 November 2012 20	Doncaster Rovers	1–0	Oldham Athletic	Keepmoat Stadium
19:45 BST		Report		Attendance: 4,252

8 December 2012 21	Colchester United	0–2	Oldham Athletic	Colchester Community Stadium
15:00 BST		Report		Attendance: 2,987

15 December 2012 22	Oldham Athletic	0–2	Swindon Town	Boundary Park
15:00 BST		Report		Attendance: 3,345

22 December 2012 23	Yeovil Town	4–1	Oldham Athletic	Huish Park
15:00 BST		Report		Attendance: 3,492

26 December 2012 24	Oldham Athletic	1–2	Doncaster Rovers	Boundary Park
15:00 BST	M'Changama 27'	Report	Jones 3'; Syers 90'	Attendance: 4,252; Referee: Rob Lewis (Shropshire)

29 December 2012 25	Oldham Athletic	1–2	Crewe Alexandra	Boundary Park
15:00 BST	Taylor 82'	Report	Pogba 61'; Ellis 84'	Attendance: 3,451; Referee: Tony Harrington (North Riding)

1 January 2013 26	Scunthorpe United	2–2	Oldham Athletic	Glanford Park
15:00 BST	Canavan 16'; Duffy 19'	Report	Byrne 35'; Baxter (pen.), 65'	Attendance: 3,116; Referee: Richard Clark (Northumberland)

5 January 2013 Postponed (FA Cup 3rd round)	Notts County	P–P	Oldham Athletic	Meadow Lane
15:00 BST

12 January 2013 27	Oldham Athletic	0–2	Brentford	Boundary Park
15:00 BST		Report	Donaldson 5' 82'	Attendance: 4,615; Referee: Andy Haines (Northumberland)

19 January 2013 28	Coventry City	2–1	Oldham Athletic	Ricoh Arena
15:00 BST	Elliott 65'; Bailey 90'	Report	Smith 89'	Attendance: 10,108; Referee: Lee Collins (Surrey)

22 January 2013 29	Notts County	1–0	Oldham Athletic	Meadow Lane
19:45 BST	Showunmi 35'	Report		Attendance: 3,409; Referee: Mark Brown (East Yorkshire)

26 January 2013 Postponed (FA Cup 4th round)	Oldham Athletic	P–P	Yeovil Town	Boundary Park
15:00 BST

2 February 2013 30	Walsall	3–1	Oldham Athletic	Bescot Stadium
15:00 BST	Baxendale 40'; Paterson 74' 90'	Report	Barnard 19'	Attendance: 4,672; Referee: Mick Russell (Hertfordshire)

5 February 2013 Postponed (Snow)	Oldham Athletic	P–P	Yeovil Town	Boundary Park
19:45 BST

9 February 2013 31	Oldham Athletic	3–1	MK Dons	Boundary Park
15:00 BST	Barnard 22'; Mvoto 44'; Iwelumo 53'	Report	Powell 39'	Attendance: 4,094; Referee: Dean Whitestone (Northamptonshire)

16 February 2013 Postponed (FA Cup 5th round)	Stevenage	v	Oldham Athletic	Broadhall Way
15:00 BST		[ Report]

19 February 2013 32	Stevenage	1–2	Oldham Athletic	Broadhall Way
19:45 BST	Dunne 9'	Report	Furman 46'; Tarkowski 60'	Attendance: 2,748; Referee: Stephen Martin (Staffordshire)

23 February 2013 33	Oldham Athletic	1–0	Portsmouth	Boundary Park
15:00 BST	Baxter 11'	Report		Attendance: 4,527; Referee: Mark Heywood (Cheshire)

26 February 2013 Postponed (FA Cup 5th round)	Preston North End	P–P	Oldham Athletic	Deepdale
		[ Report]

2 March 2013 34	Oldham Athletic	0–2	Sheffield United	Boundary Park
15:00 BST		Report	Doyle 57'; Kitson 86'	Attendance: 6,426; Referee: Woolmer (Northamptonshire)

9 March 2013 35	Tranmere Rovers	1–0	Oldham Athletic	Prenton Park
15:00 BST	Power 61'	Report		Attendance: 5,560; Referee: Robinson (Sussex)

12 March 2013 Postponed (frozen pitch)	Oldham Athletic	P–P	Hartlepool United	Boundary Park
19:45 BST

16 March 2013 36	Oldham Athletic	0–1	Bournemouth	Boundary Park
1500 BST		Report	Pitman 22'	Attendance: 3,540; Referee: Hill (Hertfordshire)

19 March 2013 37	Oldham Athletic	3–0	Hartlepool United	Boundary Park
19:45 BST	Simpson 17'; Mvoto 27'; Baxter 69'	Report		Attendance: 3,269; Referee: Langford (Birmingham)

23 March 2013 Postponed (snow)	Shrewsbury Town	P–P	Oldham Athletic	New Meadow
15:00 BST

29 March 2013 38	Swindon Town	1–1	Oldham Athletic	County Ground
15:00 BST		[ Report]		Attendance: 10,040

1 April 2013 39	Oldham Athletic	1–1	Colchester United	Boundary Park
15:00 BST		[ Report]		Attendance: 4,244

6 April 2013 40	Oldham Athletic	1–2	Carlisle United	Boundary Park
15:00 BST	Baxter (pen.), 73'	Report	Noble 9'; Mustoe 33'	Attendance: 4,271; Referee: Naylor (South Yorkshire)

9 April 2013 41	Preston North End	0–2	Oldham Athletic	Deepdale
19:45 BST	Wroe (pen.), 73'; Hayhurst 90'	Report		Attendance: 9,080; Referee: Mathieson (Cheshire)

13 April 2013 42	Bury	0–1	Oldham Athletic	Gigg Lane
15:00 BST		Report	Smith 79'	Attendance: 4,558; Referee: Gibbs (West Midlands)

16 April 2013 43	Oldham Athletic	1–0	Yeovil Town	Boundary Park
19:45 BST	Smith 45'	Report		Attendance: 3,888; Referee: Simpson (Lancashire)

20 April 2013 44	Oldham Athletic	2–1	Crawley Town	Boundary Park
15:00 BST	Smith 56'; Mvoto 90'	Report	Connolly 77'	Attendance: 4,794; Referee: Madley (West Yorkshire)

23 April 2013 45	Shrewsbury Town	1–0	Oldham Athletic	New Meadow
15:00 BST	Jacobson 49'	Report		Attendance: 5,332; Referee: Ilderton (Northumberland)

27 April 2013 46	Leyton Orient	1–1	Oldham Athletic	Matchroom Stadium
15:00 BST	Smith 22'	Report	Millar 46'	Attendance: 5,191; Referee: Graham (Essex)

=== FA Cup ===
3 November 2012 First round	Kidderminster Harriers	0–2	Oldham Athletic	Aggborough
15:00 BST		Report	Montaño 52'; Baxter 65'	Attendance: 2,888; Referee: Webb

1 December 2012 Second round	Oldham Athletic	3–1	Doncaster Rovers	Boundary Park
15:00 BST	Wabara 45'; Derbyshire 70' 77'	Report	Blake 4'	Attendance: 2,783; Referee: Miller (Durham)

5 January 2013 Third round	Nottingham Forest	2–3	Oldham Athletic	The City Ground
15:00 BST	Smith 13' (o.g.); Sharp 90'	Report	Simpson 54' 58'; Baxter 61'	Attendance: 11,293; Referee: Roger East (Wiltshire)

27 January 2013 Fourth round	Oldham Athletic	3–2	Liverpool	Boundary Park
16:00 BST	Simpson (yellow card) 9'; Smith 3', 45+3' (yellow card) 72'; Wabara (yellow card) 23' (goal) 48'	Report	Sterling (yellow card) 6'; Suárez 17'; Allen 80'	Attendance: 10,295; Referee: Probert (Wiltshire)

16 February 2013 Fifth round	Oldham Athletic	2–2	Everton	Boundary Park
18:00 BST	Obita 13'; Smith 90'	Report	Anichebe 24'; Jagielka 48'; Neville (yellow card) 55'	Attendance: 9,473; Referee: Dowd (Staffordshire)

26 February 2013 Fifth round replay	Everton	3–1	Oldham Athletic	Goodison Park
19:45 BST	Mirallas 15'; Baines (pen.), 34'; Osman 62'	Report	Smith 64'	Attendance: 32,688; Referee: Oliver (Northumberland)

=== League Cup ===
13 August 2012 First round	Oldham Athletic	2–4	Sheffield Wednesday	Boundary Park
19:45	Slew 7'; Mvoto 27'	Report	Johnson 53'; O'Grady 62', 70'; Antonio 87'	Attendance: 3,474; Referee: Ilderton

=== Football League Trophy ===
4 September 2012 First round (Northern)	Chesterfield	2–1	Oldham Athletic	Proact Stadium
19:00 BST	Whitaker 48'; Smith 90+1' (o.g.)	Report	Smith 23'	Attendance: 2,384; Referee: Harrington
