= Luke Simpson =

English footballer

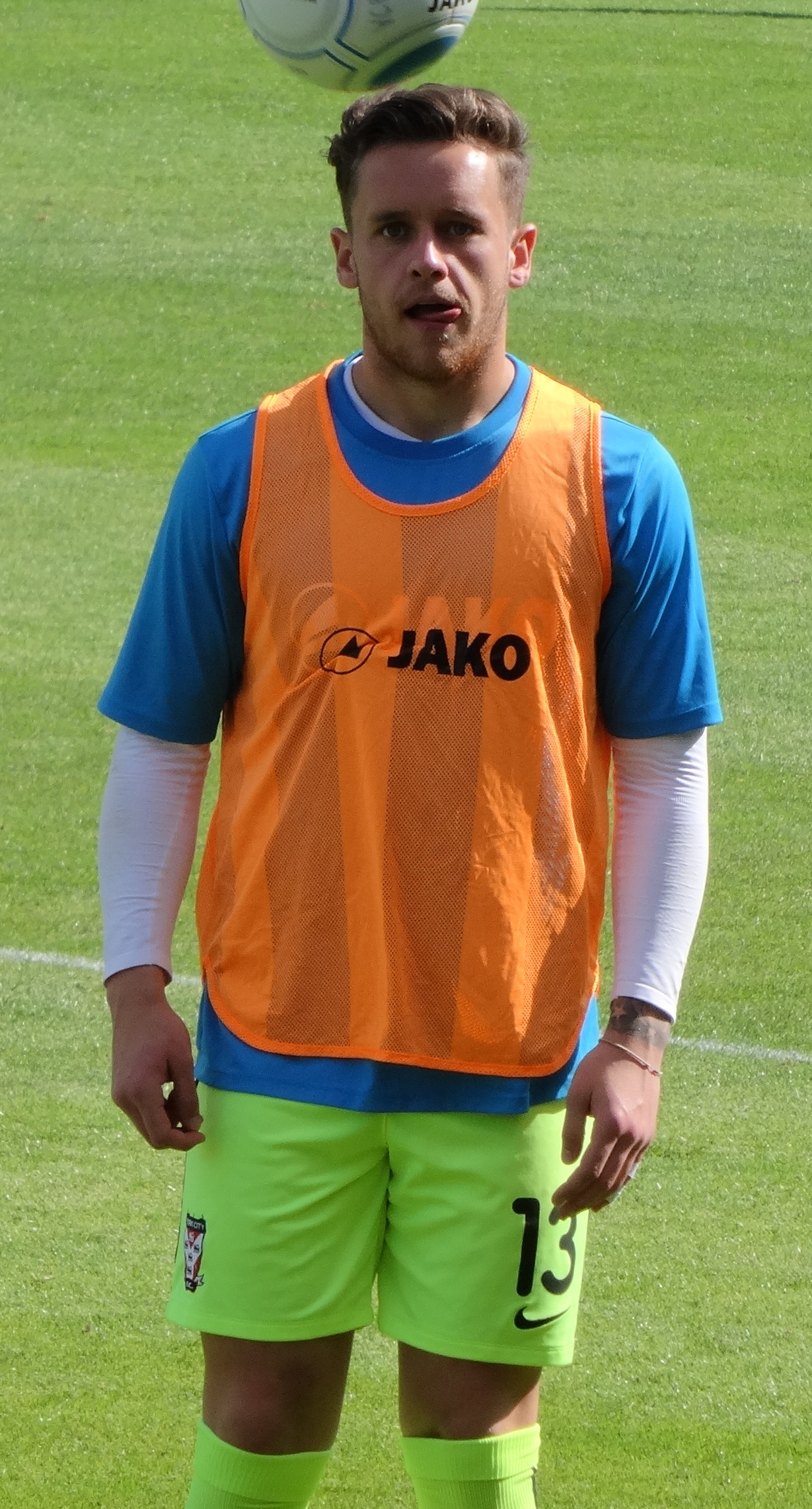
- Simpson training with York City in 2016

Personal information
- Full name: Luke Thomas Simpson
- Date of birth: 23 September 1994 (age 32)
- Place of birth: Heywood, England
- Height: 6 ft 2 in (1.88 m)
- Position: Goalkeeper

Youth career
- 2003–2012: Oldham Athletic

Senior career*
Years	Team	Apps	(Gls)
2012–2014	Oldham Athletic	0	(0)
2013	→ Nantwich Town (loan)	4	(0)
2013–2014	→ Workington (loan)	6	(0)
2014	→ Leicester City (loan)	0	(0)
2014–2015	Accrington Stanley	8	(0)
2015–2016	Watford	0	(0)
2016–2018	York City	3	(0)
2018	Macclesfield Town	0	(0)
2018–2019	Tamworth	5	(0)
2019	Wrexham	0	(0)
2019–2020	Barrow	0	(0)
2020–2022	Kidderminster Harriers	57	(0)
2022–2023	The New Saints	0	(0)
2023–2024	Ashton United	38	(0)
- * Club domestic league appearances and goals as of 10:05, 12 May 2022 (UTC)

Luke Thomas Simpson (born 23 September 1994) is an English former professional English professional footballer who played as a goalkeeper. He last played for Kidderminster Harriers, and has also played in the Football League for Accrington Stanley.

Simpson started his career with Oldham Athletic's youth system and signed a professional contract with the club in June 2013. He had loan spells with Nantwich Town, Workington and Leicester City. He had spells with Accrington Stanley and Watford before spending two seasons with York City from 2016 to 2018.

== Playing career ==
Born in Heywood, Greater Manchester, Simpson started his career as a youth player at Oldham Athletic, signing his first professional contract in June 2013. Having been an unused substitute for Oldham's first three matches of the 2013–14 season, he joined Northern Premier League Premier Division club Nantwich Town on 17 August 2013 on a one-month loan. On 20 December 2013, Simpson joined Conference North club Workington on a one-month youth loan, going on to make six appearances. On 31 January 2014, he joined Championship club Leicester City on a youth loan until the end of 2013–14.

He signed up for the League Two club Accrington Stanley on 4 August 2014. Simpson made his debut against Southend United, saving Barry Corr's 46th-minute penalty. In January 2015, he left the club after turning down a contract offer. He made nine appearances for the club in all competitions.

On 14 December 2015, Simpson signed with Premier League club Watford, to play for the under-21 team. He was released at the end of the 2015–16 season.

Simpson joined newly relegated National League club York City on 25 July 2016 on a two-year contract. He was an unused substitute as York beat Macclesfield Town 3–2 at Wembley Stadium in the 2017 FA Trophy Final. Simpson made one appearance as York ranked in 11th place in the National League North in 2017–18. He left the club at the expiry of his contract.

Simpson signed with newly promoted League Two club Macclesfield Town on 2 August 2018.

Simpson signed for Southern League Premier Division Central club Tamworth on 31 December 2018, following an injury to first-choice goalkeeper Jasbir Singh. He made his debut the following day, starting in a 3–3 draw at home to Barwell in the league. He made five appearances before leaving the club on 11 February following Singh's return to fitness.

Following leaving Tamworth, Simpson signed for Wrexham on 23 February 2019 until the end of the 2018–19 season.

Simpson joined Barrow on 25 November 2019. He left the club at the end of the 2019–20 season.

In October 2020, Simpson joined National League North side, Kidderminster Harriers, playing all 17 competitive fixtures that year before the season was curtailed due to COVID-19. Simpson signed a new 18-month contract for the club in February 2021. Following the 2021–22 season, Simpson opted against renewing his contract, citing personal reasons.

Simpson signed for The New Saints F.C. in October 2022 on a 12-month contract. https://www.tnsfc.co.uk/2022/10/20/welcome-to-park-hall-luke-simpson/

== Career statistics ==
As of 12 May 2022

Appearances and goals by club, season and competition
Club	Season	League			FA Cup		League Cup		Other		Total	
Club	Season	Division	Apps	Goals	Apps	Goals	Apps	Goals	Apps	Goals	Apps	Goals
Oldham Athletic	2011–12	League One	0	0	0	0	0	0	0	0	0	0
Oldham Athletic	2012–13	League One	0	0	0	0	0	0	0	0	0	0
Oldham Athletic	2013–14	League One	0	0	0	0	0	0	0	0	0	0
Oldham Athletic	Total		0	0	0	0	0	0	0	0	0	0
Nantwich Town (loan)	2013–14	Northern Premier League; Premier Division	4	0	—		—		—		4	0
Workington (loan)	2013–14	Conference North	6	0	—		—		—		6	0
Leicester City (loan)	2013–14	Championship	0	0	—		—		—		0	0
Accrington Stanley	2014–15	League Two	8	0	0	0	1	0	0	0	9	0
Watford	2015–16	Premier League	0	0	0	0	—		—		0	0
York City	2016–17	National League	2	0	1	0	—		0	0	3	0
York City	2017–18	National League North	1	0	0	0	—		0	0	1	0
York City	Total		3	0	1	0	—		0	0	4	0
Macclesfield Town	2018–19	League Two	0	0	0	0	0	0	0	0	0	0
Tamworth	2018–19	Southern League; Premier Division Central	5	0	—		—		0	0	5	0
Wrexham	2018–19	National League	0	0	0	0	–		0	0	0	0
Barrow	2019–20	National League	0	0	0	0	–		3	0	3	0
Kidderminster Harriers	2020–21	National League North	15	0	1	0	–		1	0	17	0
Kidderminster Harriers	2021–22	National League North	42	0	8	0	–		2	0	52	0
Kidderminster Harriers	Total		57	0	9	0	—		3	0	69	0
Career total			82	0	10	0	2	0	7	0	102	0

== Honours ==
York City

- FA Trophy: 2016–17

Barrow A.F.C.

- National League 2019–20: 2019–20

The New Saints F.C.

- 2022-23 Cymru League
- 2022-23 Welsh Fa Cup
