= Glenn Belezika =

English footballer (born 1993)

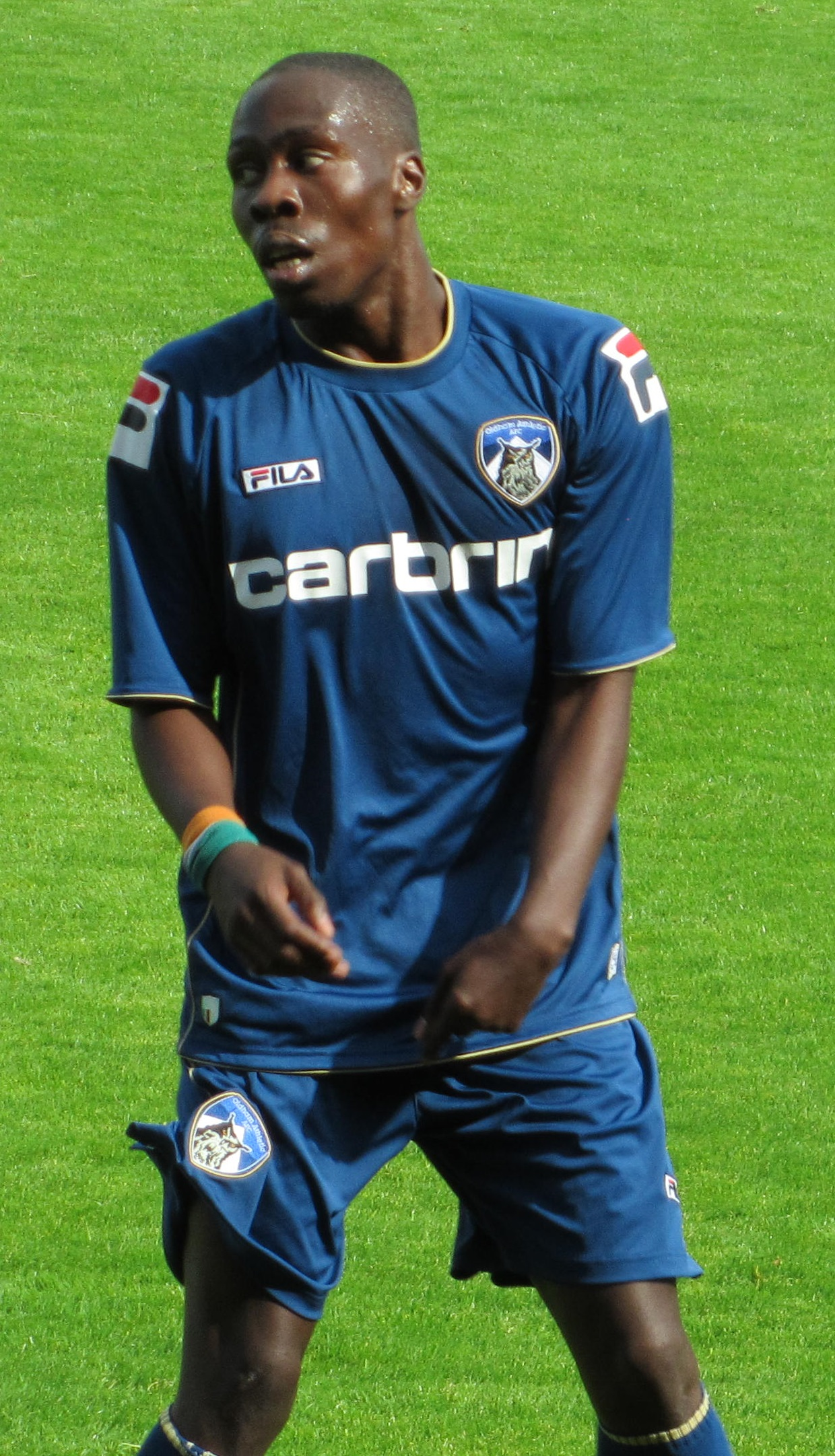
- Belezika playing for Oldham Athletic in 2012

Personal information
- Full name: Glenn Belezika
- Date of birth: 24 December 1993 (age 32)
- Place of birth: Camden, England
- Height: 5 ft 11 in (1.80 m)
- Position: Defender

Youth career
- 2011–2012: Oldham Athletic

Senior career*
Years	Team	Apps	(Gls)
2012–2014	Oldham Athletic	4	(0)
2013	→ Salisbury City (loan)	5	(0)
2013	→ Hyde (loan)	4	(0)
2014–2015	Stockport County	20	(0)
2015	→ Linfield (loan)		
2015–2016	Buxton		
2016	→ Droylsden (loan)		
2016	→ Burscough (loan)		
2016–?	Radcliffe Borough	3	(0)
- * Club domestic league appearances and goals as of 01:21, 15 December 2013 (UTC)

Glenn Belezika (born 24 December 1993) is an English footballer. He plays as a defender.

== Club career ==
=== Oldham Athletic ===
Belezika was awarded his first professional contract, signing a one-year contract with Oldham Athletic. The day after signing his first professional contract he made his first appearance for the club, coming on as a late substitute in the 3–0 loss against Sheffield Wednesday in a Football League match on 9 April 2012.

On 23 August 2013, Belezika joined Conference Premier club Salisbury City on a one-month loan deal. He made his debut for the club a day later as his side beat Aldershot Town 1–0. He made a total of five appearances before returning to Oldham.

He played his first game of the 2013–14 season for Oldham in October, as his side won 2–0 at Preston North End. But on 19 October, he joined Conference Premier side Hyde on a one-month loan deal. He made his debut the next day, losing 4–3 away at Dartford. He returned to Oldham upon completion of his loan at Hyde, appearing 4 times.

=== Stockport County ===
On 27 March 2014, Belezika had his contract cancelled at Oldham Athletic by mutual consent.

In May 2014, he agreed with Stockport County manager Alan Lord to join Edgeley Park after being clubless for nearly two months. Belezika made his debut for the Stockport against North Ferriby United at right back. Belezika put in some notable performances against Tamworth FC in Stockport's 1–0 away win and again in Stockport's 3–1 win at home against Bradford PA.

On 16 January 2015, Belezika joined Northern Irish Premiership club Linfield on loan until the end of the 2014–15 season.

=== Non-League ===
In August 2015 he signed for Buxton. He then had various loan spells from Buxton – in March 2016 he joined Droylsden and in August 2016, Burscough.

In September 2016 he moved Radcliffe Borough.

== Career statistics ==
Club	Season	League		Cup		League Cup		Europe		Other		Total	
Club	Season	Apps	Goals	Apps	Goals	Apps	Goals	Apps	Goals	Apps	Goals	Apps	Goals
Oldham Athletic	2011–12	1	0	0	0	0	0	0	0	0	0	1	0
Oldham Athletic	2012–13	3	0	0	0	0	0	0	0	0	0	3	0
Oldham Athletic	2013–14	0	0	0	0	0	0	0	0	1	0	1	0
Salisbury City(loan)	2013–14	5	0	0	0	0	0	0	0	4	0	5	0
Hyde(loan)	2013–14	4	0	0	0	0	0	0	0	0	0	4	0
Stockport	2014–15	20	0	0	0	0	0	0	0	4	0	24	0
Career total		13	0	0	0	0	0	0	0	1	0	14	0

Up to date, as of 17 August 2014.
