= Korey Smith =

English footballer

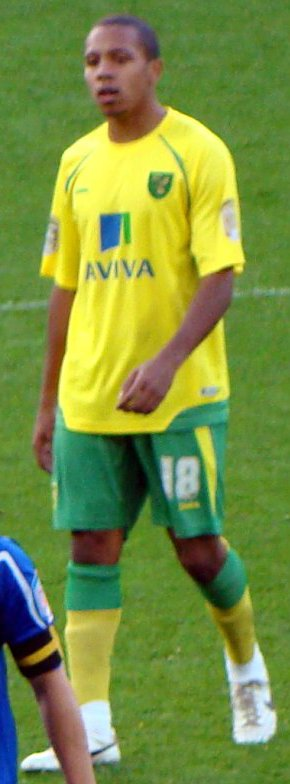
- Smith playing for Norwich City in 2010

Personal information
- Full name: Korey Alexander Sheridan Smith
- Date of birth: 31 January 1991 (age 35)
- Place of birth: Hatfield, England
- Height: 6 ft 0 in (1.83 m)
- Position: Midfielder

Youth career
- 2007–2008: Norwich City

Senior career*
Years	Team	Apps	(Gls)
2008–2013	Norwich City	67	(4)
2012	→ Barnsley (loan)	12	(0)
2012	→ Yeovil Town (loan)	17	(0)
2013	→ Oldham Athletic (loan)	10	(0)
2013–2014	Oldham Athletic	42	(1)
2014–2020	Bristol City	175	(1)
2020–2022	Swansea City	72	(0)
2022–2024	Derby County	72	(1)
2024–2026	Cambridge United	46	(1)
- * Club domestic league appearances and goals as of 15:38, 6 May 2026 (UTC)

Korey Alexander Sheridan Smith (born 31 January 1991) is an English professional footballer who plays as a midfielder.

Smith started his career at Norwich City, making his senior debut in April 2009, he had loan spells at Barnsley, Yeovil Town and Oldham Athletic, he would join Oldham permanently in June 2013. A year later, Oldham would sell Smith to Bristol City for an undisclosed fee, where he would make 196 appearances in six years and in his first season at the club would win the League One title. Smith joined Swansea City in August 2020, where he would spend two years, before he joined Derby County where in his second and final season for the club would help the club gain promotion to the Championship.

== Early life ==
Smith was "discovered plying his trade on the Sunday league park pitches". He became the captain of Norwich City Academy. He has two younger sisters. He is of Jamaican descent.

== Career ==
Smith first appeared on the bench for Norwich City in January 2008 as an unused substitute in an FA Cup match against Charlton Athletic. He made his professional debut in a 0–1 defeat to Sheffield Wednesday at Carrow Road on 4 April 2009, as an 82nd-minute substitute for David Carney.

Smith featured regularly in the Norwich team during the 2009–10 season as they won promotion from League One to the Championship as champions.

In July 2010, Smith was handed the number 18 shirt and continued to play regularly as Norwich won promotion to the Premier League.

In January 2012, Smith penned a one-month loan deal at Barnsley. He made an instant impact at Oakwell, assisting two goals on debut against Derby County in a 3–2 victory for the Reds on his 21st birthday.

In September 2012, Smith signed on a 93-day emergency loan at League One club Yeovil Town, making his debut as a substitute away at MK Dons in a 1–0 defeat.

On 15 March 2013, Smith signed on loan with Oldham Athletic until the end of the season.

=== Oldham Athletic ===
Smith signed a permanent two-year deal with Oldham Athletic on 20 June 2013, after being released by Norwich City having been at the club for seven years. Smith was made captain of Oldham Athletic after manager Lee Johnson said Smith was as brave as a lion, brave on the ball and can take the ball anywhere. He scored his first goal for the club with a strike in the FA Cup 2013–14 second round against Mansfield Town.

Smith scored his first league goal for the club in a 1–1 draw against Leyton Orient, scoring in added time to bring the scores level and earn the club a point away against the then third in the division Leyton Orient with a chipped effort from 30 yards out.

=== Bristol City ===
Smith signed a three-year deal with Bristol City on 27 June 2014 for an undisclosed fee. He scored his first goals for Bristol City when he scored twice in a 3–1 Football League Trophy win against Cheltenham Town on 8 October 2014. He helped Bristol City to a Football League Trophy and League One double in his first season with the club. Smith started 38 times the following season, as Bristol City finished 18th, meaning they avoided relegation straight back to League One. Smith underwent ankle surgery in April, returning to full training on 5 September 2016.

On 20 December 2017, Smith scored a last minute winner as Bristol City upset Premier League side Manchester United 2–1 in the EFL Cup quarter-finals at Ashton Gate.

Smith left Bristol City on 9 August 2020 after spending six years with the club.

=== Swansea City ===
On 14 August 2020, Smith joined Swansea City on a two-year contract. It was confirmed that Smith would leave the club upon the expiration of his contract at the end of the 2021–22 season.

=== Derby County ===
On 16 July 2022, Smith dropped down to League One to join newly relegated Derby County on a two-year contract. Smith would make 48 appearances for Derby County during the 2022–23 season, 40 these in the league, he was ultised as a midfielder as well as a right-back under Paul Warne.

Smith scored his first goal in nearly six years on 29 July 2023 in a 2023–24 pre-season friendly for Derby against Premier League side Sheffield United, tapping in from close range after a Nathaniel Mendez-Laing cross, Derby would go on to lose the game 3–1. Smith scored his first goal for Derby in a competitive fixture during the 2023–24 season, scoring the first goal in a 3–1 League One victory at Blackpool on 3 October 2023, he also played a part in the other two Derby goals that night. Smith made 37 appearances for Derby during the season, to go alongside his goal against Blackpool as Derby managed to secure automatic promotion by finishing runners-up in League One.

On 18 May 2024, it was announced that Smith would leave Derby at the end of his contract on 30 June 2024, after 85 appearances and one goal over two seasons.

=== Cambridge United ===
On 17 July 2024, Smith joined Cambridge United on a two-year deal. On 6 May 2026 the club announced he was being released.

=== Personal life ===
Korey is married to Hattie Bourn with whom he shares three children. His brother in law is England Rugby player Joe Launchbury (their wives are sisters).

== Career statistics ==
As of match played 25 April 2026

Appearances and goals by club, season and competition
Club	Season	League			FA Cup		League Cup		Other		Total	
Club	Season	Division	Apps	Goals	Apps	Goals	Apps	Goals	Apps	Goals	Apps	Goals
Norwich City	2007–08	Championship	0	0	0	0	0	0	—		0	0
Norwich City	2008–09	Championship	2	0	0	0	0	0	—		2	0
Norwich City	2009–10	League One	37	4	2	0	1	0	0	0	40	4
Norwich City	2010–11	Championship	28	0	1	0	1	0	—		30	0
Norwich City	2011–12	Premier League	0	0	0	0	1	0	—		1	0
Norwich City	2012–13	Premier League	0	0	0	0	0	0	—		0	0
Norwich City	Total		67	4	3	0	3	0	0	0	73	4
Barnsley (loan)	2011–12	Championship	12	0	—		—		—		12	0
Yeovil Town (loan)	2012–13	League One	17	0	—		—		2 (Note: Appearances in Football League Trophy)	0	19	0
Oldham Athletic (loan)	2012–13	League One	10	0	—		—		—		10	0
Oldham Athletic	2013–14	League One	42	1	5	1	1	0	4	0	52	1
Bristol City	2014–15	League One	44	0	4	0	0	0	6	2	54	2
Bristol City	2015–16	Championship	36	0	1	0	1	0	—		38	0
Bristol City	2016–17	Championship	23	0	1	0	0	0	—		24	0
Bristol City	2017–18	Championship	45	1	1	0	6	2	—		52	3
Bristol City	2018–19	Championship	5	0	0	0	1	0	—		6	0
Bristol City	2019–20	Championship	22	0	0	0	0	0	—		22	0
Bristol City	Total		175	1	7	0	8	2	6	2	196	5
Swansea City	2020–21	Championship	37	0	1	0	1	0	1 (Note: Appearances in Championship play-offs)	0	40	0
Swansea City	2021–22	Championship	35	0	1	0	1	0	0	0	37	0
Swansea City	Total		72	0	2	0	2	0	1	0	77	0
Derby County	2022–23	League One	40	0	4	0	3	0	1	0	48	0
Derby County	2023–24	League One	32	1	2	0	1	0	2	0	37	1
Derby County	Total		72	1	6	0	4	0	3	0	85	1
Cambridge United	2024–25	League One	23	1	2	0	1	0	3	0	29	1
Cambridge United	2025–26	League Two	23	0	2	0	1	0	2	0	28	0
Cambridge United	Total		46	1	4	0	2	0	5	0	57	1
Career Total			513	8	27	1	15	2	24	2	579	13

== Honours ==
Norwich City

- Football League Championship second-place promotion: 2010–11
- Football League One: 2009–10

Bristol City

- Football League One: 2014–15
- Football League Trophy: 2014–15

Derby County

- EFL League One second-place promotion: 2023–24

Individual

- PFA Team of the Year: 2014–15 League One
