= Matteo Lanzoni =

Italian footballer

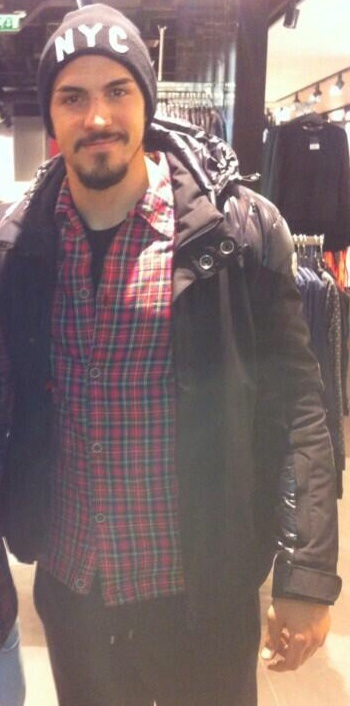
- Lanzoni in 2014

Personal information
- Date of birth: 18 July 1988 (age 38)
- Place of birth: Como, Italy
- Height: 1.89 m (6 ft 2 in)
- Position: Defender

Youth career
- Como
- 2005–2008: Sampdoria

Senior career*
Years	Team	Apps	(Gls)
2008–2013	Sampdoria	0	(0)
2008–2009	→ Bari (loan)	0	(0)
2009	→ Sambenedettese (loan)	13	(1)
2009–2010	→ Mantova (loan)	20	(1)
2010–2011	→ Portogruaro (loan)	18	(0)
2011–2012	→ Foggia (loan)	24	(0)
2012–2013	→ Carrarese (loan)	21	(0)
2013	Oldham Athletic	10	(1)
2014	Yeovil Town	6	(0)
2014–2015	Cambridge United	3	(0)
2014	→ Hartlepool United (loan)	1	(0)
2017	Mendrisio	?	(?)
2017-	Collina d'Oro	?	(?)

International career^{‡}
2006	Italy U-19	1	(0)
- * Club domestic league appearances and goals as of 31 May 2015 ‡ National team caps and goals as of 21 September 2006

Matteo Lanzoni (born 18 July 1988) is an Italian professional footballer who plays for Collina d'Oro as a defender.

Lanzoni was born in Como and began his career at local club Calcio Como, before joining Sampdoria as a trainee in 2005; signing his first professional contract three years later. Lanzoni failed to make a first-team appearance for Sampdoria but spent several loan spells with Bari, Sambenedettese, Mantova, Portogruaro, Foggia and Carrarese before being released in 2013. After his release Lanzoni signed a short-term deal for English Football League One side Oldham Athletic.

== Career ==
=== Sampdoria ===
Lanzoni spent most of his early career at Serie A side Sampdoria. After several loans to various clubs throughout Italy he was released by Sampdoria after five years at the club.

=== Oldham Athletic ===
Lanzoni went on trial at English League One club Oldham Athletic in 2013. After impressing manager Lee Johnson he was offered a four-month contract with the club, which he signed on 29 August 2013 to officially become an Oldham Athletic player.

Lanzoni made his debut for the Latics within a couple of days after signing his contract, starting against Tranmere at right-back following an injury to right-back Connor Brown. Lanzoni played the whole 90 minutes and received the Man of the Match award.

On 14 September 2013, against Rotherham United, Lanzoni scored his first goal for the club, scoring Oldham's second goal of the game from close range.

On 31 December 2013, it was announced that he had left Oldham after turning down a new contract from the club. He had made 15 appearances for the club, scoring twice.

=== Yeovil Town ===
On 2 January 2014, Lanzoni signed for Yeovil Town on an 18-month contract.

=== Cambridge United ===
On 28 August 2014, Lanzoni left Yeovil by mutual consent and signed for Cambridge United. At the end of the 2014–15 season the club did not offer him a new deal when his contract expired.
