= Jack Truelove =

English footballer

- Jack Truelove whilst on loan to Brackley Town in 2015/16

Personal information
- Full name: Jack Christopher Truelove
- Date of birth: 27 December 1995 (age 30)
- Place of birth: Burnley, England
- Height: 1.80 m (5 ft 11 in)
- Position: Defender

Youth career
- 2004–2011: Burnley
- 2011–2013: Oldham Athletic

Senior career*
Years	Team	Apps	(Gls)
2013–2016	Oldham Athletic	1	(0)
2014	→ Stalybridge Celtic (loan)	7	(0)
2014–2015	→ Colwyn Bay (loan)	4	(0)
2015	→ Brackley Town (loan)	4	(0)
2015–2016	→ Curzon Ashton (loan)	4	(0)
2016	→ Hednesford Town (loan)	13	(0)
2016	Curzon Ashton	1	(0)
2017	Mornington Soccer Club	0	(0)
2018	Curzon Ashton	0	(0)
2019-2020	Padiham	0	(0)
- * Club domestic league appearances and goals as of 07:01, 11 October 2020 (UTC)

Jack Christopher Truelove (born 27 December 1995) is former English Football League footballer with Oldham Athletic.

== Career ==
=== Oldham Athletic ===
Truelove made his professional debut for Oldham Athletic on 27 April 2013, as a second-half substitute in the game against Leyton Orient at Brisbane Road.

Truelove signed his first professional contract on 1 July 2014, signing a one-year contract with an option for a second.

On 11 May 2015, the Latics announced that Truelove was Oldham's Community Trust Player of the Season.

Following his loan-move to National League North side Brackley Town in September 2015, Truelove scored his first ever competitive goal in The Saints' 3–1 win over Tooting & Mitcham United in the FA Cup second round qualifying.

On 3 December 2015, Truelove joined National League North side Curzon Ashton on a 28-day youth loan, which proved to be fruitful for both the club and the player. Truelove made quite an impression during his stay at the Tameside Stadium, so much so that the Nash faithful even chanted a song about the Latics' fullback, appropriately titled: 'It must be love, Truelove' – a throw-back to the classic Madness anthem: 'It must be love', which topped in the UK charts at number 4 in 1983.

In a bid to help preserve their National League status, Oldham Athletic agreed to loan Truelove to Hednesford Town on another 28-day youth-loan. He made his debut for The Pitmen in the 4–1 win over Stafford Rangers in the Staffordshire Senior Cup on 19 January 2016. At the end of the initial loan period, Truelove's loan was extended at Keys Park until the end of the 2015/6 season.

=== Curzon Ashton ===
After being released by Oldham Athletic in May 2016, Truelove signed for National League North side Curzon Ashton in a bid to maintain a level of match fitness. He played just two games for The Nash against Chorley and Worcester City before agreeing a move to Mornington Soccer Club, which play in Australian Men's State League 1 South-East division.

=== Padiham ===
On 13 June 2019, Truelove signed for North West Counties Premier League side Padiham

== Career statistics ==
Appearances and goals by club, season and competition
Club	Season	League		FA Cup		League Cup		Other		Total	
Club	Season	Apps	Goals	Apps	Goals	Apps	Goals	Apps	Goals	Apps	Goals
Oldham Athletic	2012–13	1	0	0	0	0	0	0	0	1	0
Oldham Athletic	2013–14	0	0	0	0	0	0	0	0	0	0
Oldham Athletic	2014–15	0	0	0	0	0	0	0	0	0	0
Oldham Athletic	2015–16	0	0	0	0	0	0	0	0	0	0
Oldham Athletic	Total	1	0	0	0	0	0	0	0	1	0
Stalybridge Celtic (loan)	2014–15	7	0	0	0	0	0	0	0	7	0
Colwyn Bay (loan)	2014–15	4	0	0	0	0	0	0	0	4	0
Brackley Town (loan)	2015–16	3	0	1	1	0	0	0	0	4	1
Curzon Ashton (loan)	2015–16	4	0	0	0	0	0	0	0	0	0
Hednesford Town (loan)	2015–16	13	0	0	0	0	0	2	0	15	0
Curzon Ashton	2016–17	1	0	0	0	0	0	1	0	2	0
Career total		33	0	1	1	0	0	3	0	37	1

Up-to-date, as of 29 December 2016.
