= Cristian Montaño =

Colombian footballer (born 1991)

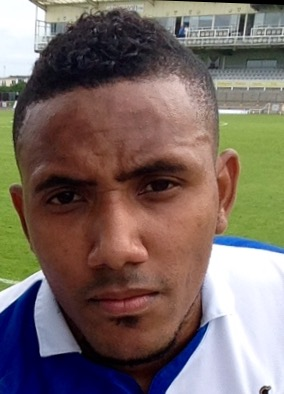
- Montaño in 2015

Personal information
- Full name: Cristian Alexis Montaño Castillo
- Date of birth: 11 December 1991 (age 34)
- Place of birth: Cali, Colombia
- Height: 5 ft 11 in (1.80 m)
- Positions: Winger; forward; left-back

Team information
- Current team: Livingston
- Number: 26

Youth career
- 2002–2010: West Ham United

Senior career*
Years	Team	Apps	(Gls)
2010–2012	West Ham United	0	(0)
2011	→ Notts County (loan)	11	(4)
2011	→ Swindon Town (loan)	4	(1)
2011–2012	→ Dagenham & Redbridge (loan)	10	(3)
2012	→ Notts County (loan)	4	(0)
2012	→ Oxford United (loan)	9	(2)
2012–2013	Oldham Athletic	40	(3)
2014–2015	América de Cali	9	(1)
2015–2017	Bristol Rovers	53	(3)
2017–2021	Port Vale	118	(12)
2021–	Livingston	112	(10)
- * Club domestic league appearances and goals as of 22:11, 20 May 2026 (UTC)

Cristian Alexis Montaño Castillo (born 11 December 1991) is a Colombian professional footballer who plays for Scottish Championship club Livingston. A versatile player, he can play at left-back or as a forward, though his preferred position is as a winger; he is known for his pace.

Born in Cali, Colombia, he emigrated to London at a young age and joined the West Ham United Academy. He never played a first-team game for the club. He did play on loan at Notts County, Swindon Town, Dagenham & Redbridge and Oxford United. He was signed by Oldham Athletic in August 2012 but was sacked in December 2013 after being arrested for spot-fixing and rape. All charges were later dropped, and he returned to his hometown in Colombia to play for América de Cali. He returned to England and joined Bristol Rovers in July 2015. He helped the club to win promotion out of League Two in 2015–16 before he moved on to Port Vale in June 2017. He stayed at Vale Park for four seasons, where he learned to play at left-back. He signed with Livingston in May 2021. The club were relegated from the Scottish Premiership in 2024, though managed to win the Scottish Challenge Cup the following year before winning promotion via the play-offs in 2025.

== Early life ==
Born in Cali, Colombia, Montaño moved to London as a child and holds the nationality of both Colombia and the United Kingdom. He recalled that he "always heard gun shots growing up in Colombia", before moving to England at the age of ten to join his mother, who had emigrated four years previously.

== Playing career ==
=== West Ham United ===
Montaño joined West Ham United as an under-12 player before he signed his first professional contract in June 2010. In August 2011, he signed a one-month loan deal with League One side Notts County, making his debut on 9 August in a League Cup game against Nottingham Forest, which Notts County lost on penalties after the game had finished 3–3. He scored on his league debut four days later in a 2–1 defeat to Charlton Athletic at Meadow Lane. His loan with the "Magpies" was extended until 9 October, after which he returned to West Ham. Manager Martin Allen said that "he's a fantastic player and what a lovely lad. He's humble, hard-working and dedicated".

Soon after leaving Notts County, Montaño signed a one-month loan deal with Swindon Town of League Two. He made his debut for the "Robins" on 15 October, scoring the second goal in a 2–0 away win against Accrington Stanley. His loan was cut short in November and he returned to the Boleyn Ground having scored one goal in four appearances. Swindon boss Paolo Di Canio said that "I don't know if he feels part of Swindon Town. He didn't prove this to me." Days after leaving Swindon, Montaño signed a one-month loan deal with League Two rivals Dagenham & Redbridge. He scored on his debut for the "Daggers" in a 3–2 defeat to Southend United at Victoria Road on 19 November. Montaño's loan was twice extended as manager John Still felt that "it gives us a player who has done very well for a little bit longer."

Montaño again joined Notts County on loan in February 2012. However, he played only four games in his second spell and the loan was not extended and he returned to West Ham in March. On 16 March, Montaño returned to League Two when he joined Oxford United on loan as a replacement for ex-loanee Lee Holmes. His first goal for the "U's" came on 7 April in a 2–1 away defeat to Northampton Town. Manager Chris Wilder decided to extend the loan spell after finding that striker Tom Craddock would not recover from his injury before the end of the season. In total he scored ten goals in 39 appearances for four different clubs across five separate loan spells during the 2011–12 season.

=== Oldham Athletic ===
In August 2012, Montaño signed a two-year contract with Oldham Athletic, with the option of a third year, for an undisclosed fee (reported as being £50,000). Manager Paul Dickov said that: "I gather he could have stayed at West Ham, but he was keen to move because of his wish to play football rather than being a squad player." He scored two goals in 33 games in the 2012–13 campaign after missing two months with a tore thigh muscle. He scored twice in 15 games in the first half of the 2013–14 season.

He was sacked by the club in December 2013 on the grounds of gross misconduct relating to alleged spot-fixing in relation to the 2013 English match fixing scandal. He said he was preparing to head to Manchester to speak to manager Lee Johnson when a club director rang to ask his location, the director then informed the police, who came to his location and arrested him, and the club announced that they had sacked Montaño whilst he was at the police station; he said "no-one from Oldham spoke to me about it. ... they were turning against me, I was left on my own". In November 2014, having been released from bail but with investigation still ongoing by the National Crime Agency, Montaño announced his intention to sue Oldham Athletic for unlawful dismissal and loss of earnings; this would be the remaining £39,000 of his £1,500 a week wages and compensation of £76,500. The spot-fixing charges were dropped in January 2015.

"I had got no club. I thought my life was over, all I know is football. Then I saw all the abuse I was getting on Twitter. How much people were talking. People wishing bad on me, saying, 'I hope someone breaks your legs'. Other people were laughing at me and telling me I wouldn't get back into football and wishing the worst on me. Listening to what people were saying about me on social media led to me thinking about taking my own life."

— Montaño was suicidal after facing possible financial ruin and the prospect of the criminal charges costing him his career, as well as turning friends and supporters against him.

=== América de Cali ===
Following his dismissal by Oldham Athletic, Montaño returned to his hometown to play for América de Cali in the Categoría Primera B; he slept on a friend's couch and took a bus to the training ground. He scored one goal in nine league games in the 2014 season to help the "Scarlets" to a fifth-place finish and also made seven appearances in the Copa Colombia. He featured twice at the Estadio Olímpico Pascual Guerrero in the 2015 season before returning to England after the criminal charges against him were dropped.

=== Bristol Rovers ===
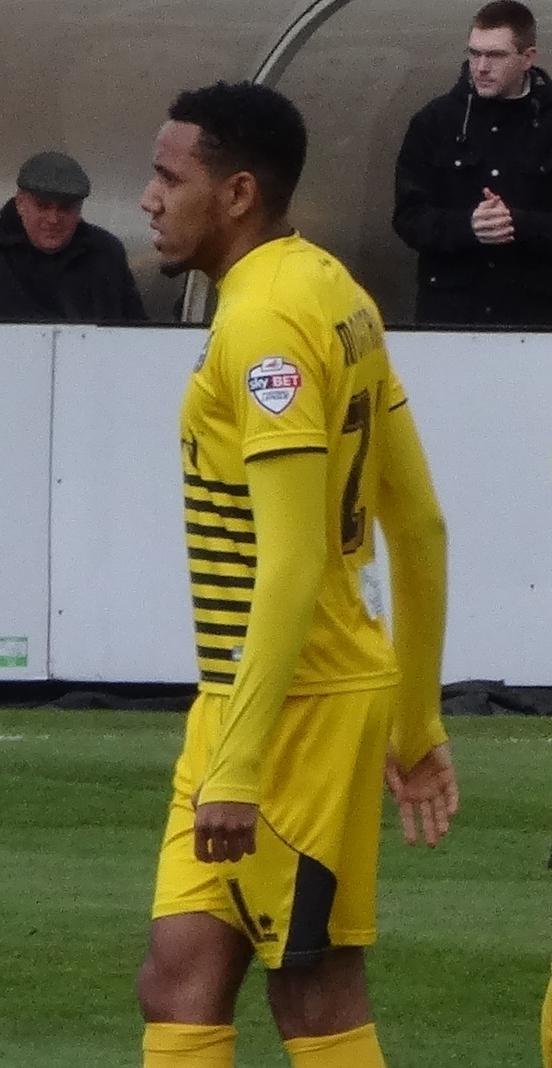
Montaño playing for Bristol Rovers in 2016

Montaño joined Bristol Rovers in July 2015; manager Darrell Clarke stated that "he comes with quite a lot of baggage [but] I know that he is desperate for another opportunity to play league football and I'm a firm believer in giving everyone a second chance". He scored two goals in 31 appearances as the "Gas" secured automatic promotion out of League Two in 2015–16. He signed a contract extension of an undisclosed length in June 2016. He played 31 games in the 2016–17 campaign before he was released in April 2017. Clarke said that "Montaño was a very tough decision, it was borderline really. But there has to be a freshness and a bigger freshness than we've had in the last couple of seasons".

=== Port Vale ===
Montaño signed a two-year contract with newly-relegated League Two side Port Vale in June 2017. Manager Michael Brown stated that "hopefully he will be an exciting player for us. We have someone who has to put the ball in the box – to feed the Pope!" Montaño impressed in pre-season, however, struggled at the start of the 2017–18 season after picking up a troublesome hamstring injury. The injury developed into a tear in early September, ruling him out of action for two months. He returned to action as a late substitute on 17 October, when he scored his first goal for the club in a 3–0 win at Morecambe. He went on to establish himself in the first-team and scored three goals within the space of four days at the start of December – his brace against Cambridge United earned him a mention on the League Two team of the week. He was sent off after giving away a penalty in an FA Cup match at Yeovil Town on 12 December, but was defended by manager Neil Aspin, who claimed it was a "soft" penalty. Montaño became unpopular with some supporters, but was praised by Aspin after filling in at left-back in February. He excelled in his new role, and was one of the "Valiants" most in-form players until he was sidelined with a hamstring injury in mid-April. Aspin handed him a new two-year contract the following month and told the press that "I felt it was imperative to what we want to do next season that we got him signed".

He struggled with injury at the start of the 2018–19 season, missing most of September with a knee injury and then breaking down upon his return to action at home to Milton Keynes Dons on 2 October, leaving the team to go down to ten men after leaving the pitch 20 minutes after coming on as a half-time substitute. Speaking at the end of the month, Aspin said Montaño "needs to get his finger out [as] the time for pussy-footing about is over" and that he needed to return to fitness and rediscover the excellent form he showed at full-back the previous season. He managed to show his ability by scoring two goals in a 3–0 victory at Yeovil Town on 27 November, after the game he said that "I feel really happy with myself and my performance – being able to repay the gaffer and the confidence he gave me to be in the front three". Seven days later he again scored a brace at Vale Park, helping Vale to a 4–0 over Stoke City U21 in the EFL Trophy; Aspin went on to say that Montaño had been disappointing at left-back at the start of the campaign, but had been excellent in his traditional role as a left-winger. The performance against Stoke earned him the EFL Trophy's Player of the second round award. He ended the campaign with seven goals in 20 starts and 13 substitute appearances.

He picked up a hamstring injury in the first pre-season game of the 2019–20 campaign and was ruled out of action until the season's opening game. Though John Askey put him back to his favoured position on the left-wing, Montaño said that he learned a lot from his time as a left-back under Aspin and became a better winger as a result. He was then returned to the left-back role in the absence of Adam Crookes in October/November and Askey said that "I would say he has looked better at left back than when he was playing left wing at the start of the season". He was at fault for Macclesfield Town's opening goal in a 2–2 Boxing Day draw, but responded well by being named as man of the match in the next two games. He was praised by the Port Vale Foundation Trust for helping the charity to support the local community during the COVID-19 pandemic in England. He signed a new one-year contract after he ended the campaign with 36 appearances.

He scored a "goal-of-the-season contender" in a 3–2 home defeat to Leyton Orient on 29 November 2020, "charging forward [from left-back] and bending the ball into the top corner with his weaker right foot". He was named on the League Two Team of the Week for his performance during the 6–3 win at Bolton Wanderers on 5 December. Port Vale appointed former Bristol Rovers boss Darrell Clarke as the club's new manager and he expressed his surprise at how well Montaño could play at left-back. He was sent off for dissent in his final game for the club, much to Clarke's anger. At the end of the 2020–21 season however, it was announced that Montano's contract would not be renewed and he would be leaving the club later that month.

=== Livingston ===
On 12 May 2021, Montaño signed for Scottish Premiership club Livingston on a two-year deal with the club having the option of an additional year following a lengthy pursuit by manager David Martindale. Injuries restricted him to just 11 appearances and six starts in the first half of the 2021–22 season, only managing to get a run of games in December. However, he was then again sidelined with a hamstring injury. On 5 February, he was sent off after receiving two yellow cards during a 2–1 win over Aberdeen at the Almondvale Stadium. He started just seven league games for the "Lions" in his debut season, featuring 19 times in total. However, he started the 2022–23 season in fine form, and his third goal of the campaign moved Livingston into third place with a 1–0 win over Kilmarnock on 17 September. He ended the season with four Premiership goals from 25 starts and six substitute appearances. He was sidelined for six weeks after sustaining a calf injury in training in August 2023. He picked up another injury in January. He was named on the Premiership Team of the Week for his performance in a 2–1 win over St Johnstone on 11 May 2024. On 30 March 2025, he won the Scottish Challenge Cup with Livingston as they beat Queen's Park by five goals to nil in the final at the Falkirk Stadium. Promotion back to the Premiership was then secured with a 5–3 aggregate victory over Ross County in the play-off final.

Montaño signed a new two-year contract in July 2025. On 27 December, he scored a brace against Celtic, though Livingston lost the game by four goals to two to keep themselves at the bottom of the table and without a win in 16 league games. On 22 February, he was sent off for a last-man challenge on Djeidi Gassama in a 2–2 draw with Rangers. He played 28 games in the 2025–26 season, which culminated in relegation.

== Personal life ==
In December 2013, Montaño and two friends were charged with the rape of a woman in Romford, London. He appeared in court in March 2014. He admitted to having sex with the woman but maintained it was entirely consensual. No verdict was returned by the jury and the prosecution dropped the case.

Speaking in July 2018, he stated that "My missus is English [and] my two kids were born in England". In 2020, he began co-hosting a mental health podcast called The Men Unite Podcast with Daniel Biddulph. His partner, as of 2022, is finance worker Jo-Hannah Eardley.

== Career statistics ==
As of match played 17 May 2026

Appearances and goals by club, season and competition
Club	Season	League			National cup (Note: Includes FA Cup, Copa Colombia, Scottish Cup)		League cup (Note: Includes League/EFL Cup, Scottish League Cup)		Other		Total	
Club	Season	Division	Apps	Goals	Apps	Goals	Apps	Goals	Apps	Goals	Apps	Goals
West Ham United	2010–11	Premier League	0	0	0	0	0	0	—		0	0
West Ham United	2011–12	Premier League	0	0	0	0	0	0	—		0	0
West Ham United	Total		0	0	0	0	0	0	0	0	0	0
Notts County (loan)	2011–12	League One	15	4	0	0	1	0	0	0	16	4
Swindon Town (loan)	2011–12	League Two	4	1	0	0	—		0	0	4	1
Dagenham & Redbridge (loan)	2011–12	League Two	10	3	0	0	—		—		10	3
Oxford United (loan)	2011–12	League Two	9	2	—		—		—		9	2
Oldham Athletic	2012–13	League One	30	1	2	1	0	0	1 (Note: Appearance(s) in the Football League Trophy / EFL Trophy.)	0	33	2
Oldham Athletic	2013–14	League One	10	2	2	0	1	0	2	0	15	2
Oldham Athletic	Total		40	3	4	1	1	0	3	0	48	4
América de Cali	2014	Categoría Primera B	9	1	7	0	—		0	0	16	1
América de Cali	2015	Categoría Primera B	0	0	1	0	—		1 (Note: Appearance(s) in the Categoría Primera B promotion tournament.)	0	2	0
América de Cali	Total		9	1	8	0	0	0	1	0	18	1
Bristol Rovers	2015–16	League Two	28	2	0	0	1	0	2	0	31	2
Bristol Rovers	2016–17	League One	25	1	3	0	1	0	2	0	31	1
Bristol Rovers	Total		53	3	3	0	2	0	4	0	62	3
Port Vale	2017–18	League Two	30	4	2	0	0	0	3	2	35	6
Port Vale	2018–19	League Two	29	5	1	0	1	0	2	2	33	7
Port Vale	2019–20	League Two	30	0	3	0	1	0	2	0	36	0
Port Vale	2020–21	League Two	29	3	0	0	1	0	4	1	34	4
Port Vale	Total		118	12	6	0	3	0	11	5	138	17
Livingston	2021–22	Scottish Premiership	14	0	2	0	3	0	—		19	0
Livingston	2022–23	Scottish Premiership	31	4	1	0	4	0	—		36	4
Livingston	2023–24	Scottish Premiership	16	1	2	0	5	2	—		23	3
Livingston	2024–25	Scottish Championship	25	3	3	1	4	0	8 (Note: 4 appearances in the Scottish Challenge Cup and 4 appearances in the play-offs)	0	40	4
Livingston	2025–26	Scottish Premiership	26	2	1	0	1	0	—		28	2
Livingston	2026–27	Scottish Championship	0	0	0	0	0	0	—		0	0
Livingston	Total		112	10	9	1	17	2	8	0	146	13
Career total			370	39	30	2	24	2	27	5	451	48

== Honours ==
Bristol Rovers

- League Two third-place promotion: 2015–16

Livingston

- Scottish Challenge Cup: 2024–25
- Scottish Premiership play-offs: 2025
