= Chris Sutherland (footballer) =

English footballer

Personal information
- Full name: Christopher Paul Sutherland
- Date of birth: 4 August 1995 (age 31)
- Place of birth: Manchester, England
- Position: Winger

Team information
- Current team: Hyde United

Youth career
- 2011–2012: Oldham Athletic

Senior career*
Years	Team	Apps	(Gls)
2012–2014	Oldham Athletic	10	(0)
2013	→ Barrow (loan)	6	(0)
2015	Ashton United	14	(0)
2015–2017	Macclesfield Town	9	(0)
2017	→ Hyde United (loan)	13	(2)
2017–2020	Hyde United	25	(1)
- * Club domestic league appearances and goals as of 21:40, 30 April 2020 (UTC)

Christopher Paul Sutherland (born 4 August 1995) is an English footballer who plays as a winger for Northern Premier League Division One North club Hyde United.

== Career ==
Sutherland made his professional debut for Oldham Athletic on 15 September 2012, as a second-half substitute, in a 2–2 draw with Notts County at Boundary Park. On 26 August, Sutherland was sent out on a months loan to Barrow. He was released by Oldham in January 2014 and he subsequently joined Northern Premier League Premier Division side Ashton United in the summer of 2015 but was released by them the following November. On 18 December, Sutherland joined National League side Macclesfield Town. He went on to make nine appearances across 2015–16 and 2016–17 before joining Northern Premier League Division One North club Hyde United on a one-month loan on 6 January 2017.

== Career statistics ==
As of 30 May 2017.

Appearances and goals by club, season and competition
Club	Season	League			Cup (Note: Includes the FA Cup.)		League Cup (Note: Includes the EFL Cup and Northern Premier League Challenge Cup.)		Continental		Other (Note: Includes the EFL Trophy and FA Trophy.)		Total	
Club	Season	Division	Apps	Goals	Apps	Goals	Apps	Goals	Apps	Goals	Apps	Goals	Apps	Goals
Oldham Athletic	2012–13	League One	10	0	1	0	0	0	—		0	0	11	0
Oldham Athletic	2013–14	League One	0	0	0	0	0	0	—		0	0	0	0
Oldham Athletic	Total		10	0	1	0	0	0	—		0	0	11	0
Barrow (loan)	2013–14	Football Conference	6	0	0	0	—		—		0	0	6	0
Ashton United	2015–16	NPL Premier Division	14	0	3	0	0	0	—		4	1	21	1
Macclesfield Town	2015–16	National League	8	0	0	0	—		—		0	0	8	0
Macclesfield Town	2016–17	National League	1	0	0	0	—		—		0	0	1	0
Macclesfield Town	Total		9	0	0	0	—		—		0	0	9	0
Hyde United (loan)	2016–17	NPL Division One North	13	2	0	0	0	0	—		0	0	13	2
Career total			41	2	4	0	0	0	—		4	1	54	3
