= Joe Cooper (footballer, born 1994) =

English footballer

Personal information
- Full name: Joseph Mark Cooper
- Date of birth: 1994 (age 31–32)
- Place of birth: Oldham, England
- Position: Defender

Youth career
- –2013: Oldham Athletic

Senior career*
| Years | Team | Apps | (Gls) |
| 2013–2013 | Oldham Athletic | 1 | (0) |
| 2013 | → Celtic Nation FC (loan) | 1 | (0) |
- * Club domestic league appearances and goals as of 16:39, 28 August 2013 (UTC)

Joseph Mark Cooper (born 1994) is an English former footballer who played for Oldham Athletic. He played as a defender. He decided to leave football and study economics at Leeds Metropolitan University.

== Career ==
=== Oldham Athletic ===
Joe Cooper made his professional debut for Oldham Athletic on 23 April 2013, starting the match against Shrewsbury Town at New Meadow.

Joe Cooper was sent out on a months loan to Celtic Nation FC in August 2013, around about the start of the new football season to gain first - team experience.

On 17 September 2013 Cooper quit professional football to study economics at Leeds Metropolitan University.

== Career statistics ==
Appearances and goals by club, season and competition
| Club | Season | League | | FA Cup | | League Cup | | Europe | | Other | | Total | |
| Club | Season | Apps | Goals | Apps | Goals | Apps | Goals | Apps | Goals | Apps | Goals | Apps | Goals |
|---|---|---|---|---|---|---|---|---|---|---|---|---|---|
| Oldham Athletic | 2012–13 | 1 | 0 | 0 | 0 | 0 | 0 | 0 | 0 | 0 | 0 | 1 | 0 |
| Celtic Nation FC (loan) | 2013-14 | 1 | 0 | 0 | 0 | 0 | 0 | 0 | 0 | 0 | 0 | 1 | 0 |
| Career total | | 2 | 0 | 0 | 0 | 0 | 0 | 0 | 0 | 0 | 0 | 2 | 0 |

Up to date, as of 28 August 2013.
