= Connor Brown (footballer) =

English footballer (born 1991)

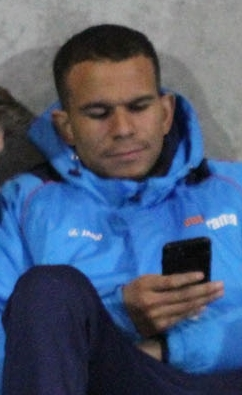
- Brown with York City in 2018

Personal information
- Full name: Connor Anton Brown
- Date of birth: 2 October 1991 (age 35)
- Place of birth: Sheffield, England
- Height: 5 ft 8 in (1.73 m)
- Position: Right back

Team information
- Current team: Bradford (Park Avenue)

Youth career
- –2011: Sheffield United

Senior career*
Years	Team	Apps	(Gls)
2011–2012	Sheffield United	0	(0)
2011	→ Eastwood Town (loan)	4	(0)
2012	→ Hinckley United (loan)	6	(0)
2012–2016	Oldham Athletic	89	(1)
2014–2015	→ Carlisle United (loan)	8	(0)
2016–2018	Guiseley	51	(0)
2018	→ York City (loan)	4	(0)
2018	York City	7	(0)
2018–2023	Barrow	90	(2)
2023–2024	Buxton	42	(0)
2024	Ilkeston Town	6	(0)
2024–2025	Spalding United	24	(0)
2025–	Bradford (Park Avenue)	0	(0)
- * Club domestic league appearances and goals as of 18:15, 26 June 2025 (UTC)

Connor Anton Brown (born 2 October 1991) is an English professional footballer who plays as a right back for Northern Premier League Division One East club Bradford (Park Avenue). He has played in the Football League for Oldham Athletic, Carlisle United and Barrow.

== Career ==
=== Sheffield United ===
Brown was born in Sheffield, South Yorkshire. He started his career with Sheffield United as a junior in their Academy before signing a professional contract in the summer of 2011. After failing to make the breakthrough into the first team, he was released in the summer of 2012.

=== Oldham Athletic ===
Brown signed a one-year contract with Sheffield United's League One rivals Oldham Athletic on 8 June 2012, with the option of a further year. In his first season with the club, Brown made 29 appearances in all competitions.

In May 2013, he was rewarded with the one-year option on his contract being exercised.

At the end of the 2013–14 season, Brown was offered a new contract. In spite of this, he was seldom in the starting line-up at the beginning of the 2014–15 season and on 3 November 2014 he joined League Two club Carlisle United on a 28-day loan, which was later extended until 3 January 2015. He played nine matches there before returning to Oldham on 3 January.

On 31 August 2016, Brown had his contract terminated by mutual consent after four years at the club.

=== Guiseley and York City ===
Brown signed for National League club Guiseley on 29 September 2016.

On 20 January 2018, Brown joined National League North club York City on loan until the end of the 2017–18 season. He made his debut the same day, starting in a 2–2 draw at home to Spennymoor Town. Having made four appearances, he signed for York permanently on 13 February 2018. Brown totalled 11 appearances as York finished 2017–18 in 11th place in the table. He was released at the end of the season.

=== Barrow ===
Brown signed for National League club Barrow on 9 July 2018. In May 2019, he agreed a new one-year contract, with the option for a further year.

=== Buxton ===
On 3 February 2023, Brown signed for National League North side Buxton.

=== Ilkeston Town ===
In May 2024, Brown joined Northern Premier League Premier Division side Ilkeston Town.

=== Spalding United ===
On 18 September 2024, Brown joined Southern League Premier Division Central club Spalding United.

=== Bradford (Park Avenue) ===
In June 2025, Brown joined Northern Premier League Division One East side Bradford (Park Avenue).

== Suspension from Sheffield United ==
Following the conviction of teammate Ched Evans for rape in 2012, Brown posted defamatory comments about the victim on social networking service Twitter and was subsequently suspended by Sheffield United before being released.

== Career statistics ==
As of end of 2024–25 season

Appearances and goals by club, season and competition
Club	Season	League			FA Cup		League Cup		Other		Total	
Club	Season	Division	Apps	Goals	Apps	Goals	Apps	Goals	Apps	Goals	Apps	Goals
Sheffield United	2011–12	League One	0	0	0	0	0	0	0	0	0	0
Eastwood Town (loan)	2011–12	Conference North	4	0	—		—		—		4	0
Hinckley United (loan)	2011–12	Conference North	6	0	—		—		—		6	0
Oldham Athletic	2012–13	League One	25	0	4	0	0	0	0	0	29	0
Oldham Athletic	2013–14	League One	27	1	0	0	1	0	1 (Note: Appearance in Football League Trophy)	0	29	1
Oldham Athletic	2014–15	League One	24	0	—		1	0	1	0	26	0
Oldham Athletic	2015–16	League One	13	0	0	0	0	0	1	0	14	0
Oldham Athletic	2016–17	League One	0	0	—		0	0	0	0	0	0
Oldham Athletic	Total		89	1	4	0	2	0	3	0	98	1
Carlisle United (loan)	2014–15	League Two	8	0	1	0	—		—		9	0
Guiseley	2016–17	National League	31	0	2	0	—		2 (Note: Appearance(s) in FA Trophy)	0	35	0
Guiseley	2017–18	National League	20	0	4	0	—		1	0	25	0
Guiseley	Total		51	0	7	0	—		3	0	60	0
York City	2017–18	National League North	11	0	—		—		—		11	0
Barrow	2018–19	National League	30	0	1	0	—		1	0	32	0
Barrow	2019–20	National League	17	1	0	0	—		3	0	20	1
Barrow	2020–21	League Two	19	1	1	0	1	0	3	0	24	1
Barrow	2021–22	League Two	21	0	4	0	2	0	1	0	28	0
Barrow	2022–23	League Two	3	0	0	0	0	0	0	0	3	0
Total			90	2	6	0	3	0	8	0	107	2
Buxton	2022–23	National League North	17	0	0	0	—		0	0	17	0
Buxton	2023–24	National League North	25	0	0	0	—		0	0	25	0
Buxton	Total		42	0	0	0	0	0	0	0	42	0
Ilkeston Town	2024–25	NPL Premier Division	6	0	0	0	—		0	0	6	0
Spalding United	2024–25	Southern League Premier Division Central	24	0	0	0	—		1	0	25	0
Career total			331	3	17	0	5	0	15	0	368	3
