= Danny Gosset =

Welsh footballer

Daniel Gosset
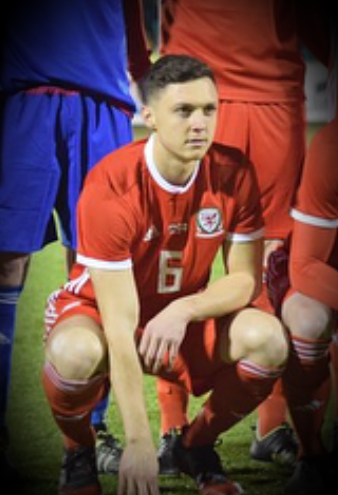

Personal information
- Full name: Daniel Sion Gosset
- Date of birth: 30 September 1994 (age 32)
- Place of birth: Bangor, Wales
- Position: Midfielder

Team information
- Current team: Caernarfon Town
- Number: 8

Youth career
- 2008–2013: Oldham Athletic

Senior career*
Years	Team	Apps	(Gls)
2013–2014	Oldham Athletic	2	(0)
2013–2014	→ Stockport County (loan)	15	(0)
2014–2015	Rhyl	21	(2)
2015–2016	The New Saints	10	(0)
2016–2018	Bangor City	64	(2)
2018–2021	Bala Town	24	(0)
2019	→ Cefn Druids (loan)	9	(0)
2021–	Caernarfon Town	112	(13)
- * Club domestic league appearances and goals as of 20:28, 22 August 2026 (UTC)

Daniel Sion "Danny" Gosset (born 30 September 1994) is a Welsh footballer who plays for Cymru Premier club Caernarfon Town. He began his career with Oldham Athletic and has made appearances in the Football League before his release.

== Club career ==
=== Oldham Athletic ===
Gosset made his professional debut for Oldham Athletic on 23 April 2013, as a second-half substitute, in aOne match against Shrewsbury Town at New Meadow. Gosset went on to make his full debut for the club a few days later with a promising performance in midfield in a match against Leyton Orient at Brisbane Road. Johnson praised the influence of Gosset: "I thought he was fantastic," said Johnson. "He is a lad who has come from nowhere, really, and impressed me in training. It was a good-tempo, proper game and he was a real positive."

On 29 August, Gosset was sent out on a months loan to Stockport County. Gosset made his first appearance for Stockport County, starting for County in a 3-1 win against Gainsborough Trinity and producing a fantastic performance in the centre of midfield.

On 1 November, after promising performances for the club, Gosset's loan was extended for a further month until the end of November.

Gosset's loan ended at Stockport County at the end of November, Gosset was a first team regular during his loan spell and produced excellent performances, he returned to the Latics upon completion of his loan, featuring in 15 games during his three - month loan with The Hatters.

Gosset was released at the end of the 2013–14 season, after failing to break into the first-team picture.

=== Rhyl ===
Following a mixed pre-season, Gosset went on to sign for Rhyl late in the 2014 season. Daniel made his full debut for the lillywhites on 1 November 2014 against fellow Welsh Premier side Bala Town.

Gosset's first goal for the Lillywhites came on 14 March 2015 in a derby match against fellow Welsh Premier Side rivals, Bangor City A stunning 20 yard strike capped off a solid performance from the youngster at right back.

=== The New Saints (TNS) ===
After impressing on trial Gosset joined Craig Harrison's side in September 2015 and wore the number 15 shirt for The Saints.

Gosset struggled to break into the starting eleven mainly due to the success that TNS were having at the time and an unfortunate injury. Gosset went out on loan to Rhyl FC to pursue more game time.

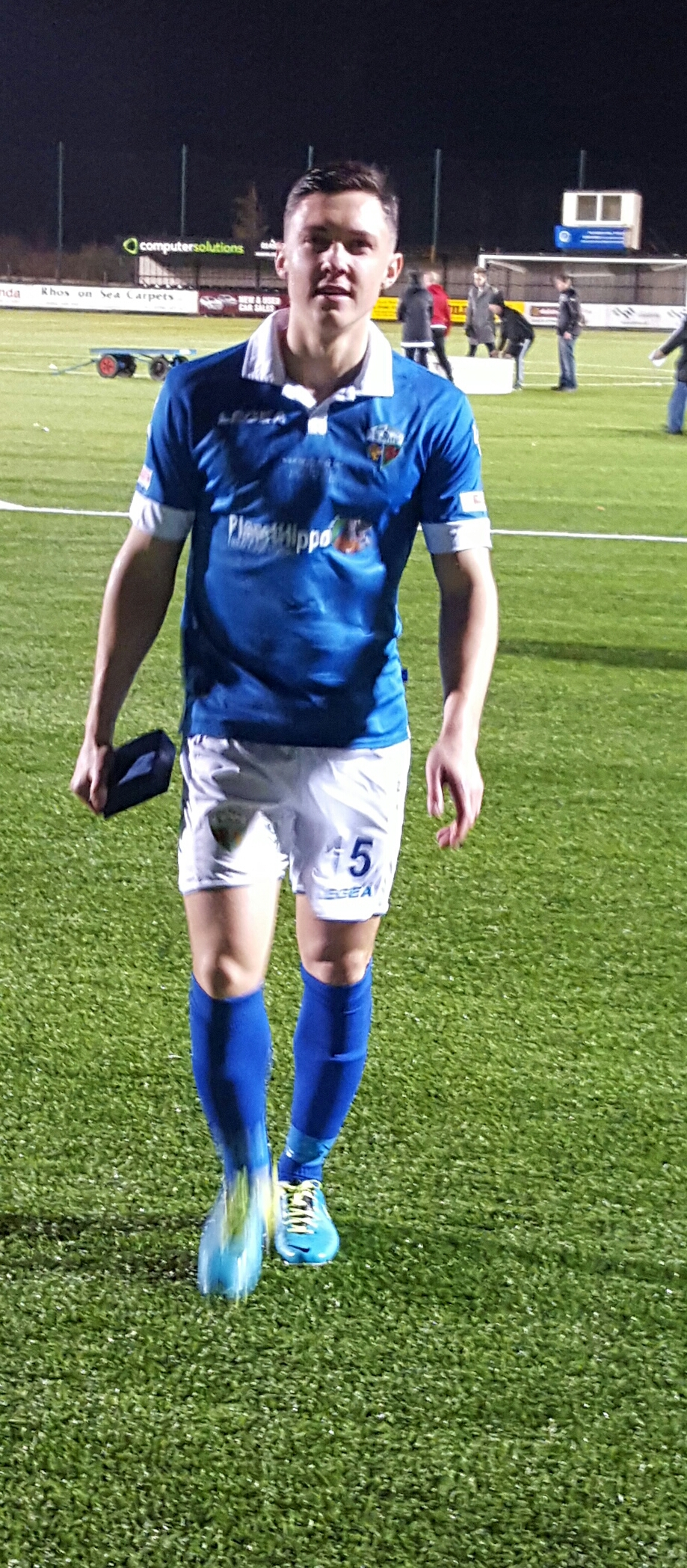
Gosset in 2016

Gosset's contract expired at the end of the 2015–16 season.

=== Bangor City ===
On 22 June 2016, he signed for Bangor City. It was a successful season and Bangor City FC qualified for the 2017/18 Europa League by beating Cardiff MET in the play off Final.

Gosset made his Europa League debut appearance on 29 June 2017 away at Danish side Lyngby BK.

=== Bala Town ===
On 4 August 2018, he signed for Bala Town.

=== Caernarfon Town ===
In June 2021 he signed for Caernarfon Town. on 24 September 2022 Caernarfon Town would play in the Scottish SPFL TrustTrophy they would be beaten by Clyde 1-0 at New Douglas Park.

== International career ==
Gosset has represented Wales at C level and made his international debut on 20 March 2018 where he faced a strong England side made up of the best young talent of the English National League System.

== Career statistics ==
Club	Season	League		FA Cup		League Cup		Welsh Cup		Welsh League Cup		Europe		Other		Total	
Club	Season	Apps	Goals	Apps	Goals	Apps	Goals	Apps	Goals	Apps	Goals	Apps	Goals	Apps	Goals	Apps	Goals
Oldham Athletic	2012–13	2	0	0	0	0	0	-	-	-	-	0	0	0	0	2	0
Stockport County (loan)	2013–14	15	0	0	0	0	0	-	-	-	-	0	0	0	0	15	0
Rhyl	2014–15	21	2	-	-	-	-	0	0	0	0	0	0	0	0	21	2
TNS	2015–16	4	0	-	-	-	-	3	0	3	0	-	-	0	0	10	0
Bangor City	2016–17	31	1	-	-	-	-	3	0	1	0	-	-	0	0	35	1
Bangor City	2017–18	23	0	-	-	-	-	4	1	1	0	1	0	0	0	29	1
Bala Town	2018–19																
Career		96	2	0	0	0	0	10	0	5	0	1	0	0	0	112	4

== Honours ==
The New Saints

- Welsh Premier League: 2015–16
- Welsh Cup: 2015–16

Caernarfon Town

- Welsh Cup: 2025–26

Individual

- Welsh Premier League Team of the Year: 2017–18

== Personal life ==
Gosset grew up on the outskirts of Snowdonia, North Wales and attended Ysgol Gynradd Waunfawr, Ysgol Gynradd Y Felinheli and Ysgol Syr Hugh Owen, Caernarfon.

In August 2019, he was diagnosed with B-Cell Non-Hodgkin's Lymphoma. On 28 January 2020, Gosset announced via his Twitter page he has been given the all clear.
