= David Mellor (footballer) =

English footballer

Personal information
- Full name: David Anthony Mellor
- Date of birth: 10 July 1993 (age 33)
- Place of birth: Oldham, England
- Height: 5 ft 9 in (1.75 m)
- Positions: Midfielder; defender

Team information
- Current team: Harrisburg Heat
- Number: 12

Youth career
- 2001–2009: Manchester United
- 2009–2011: Oldham Athletic

Senior career*
Years	Team	Apps	(Gls)
2011–2015	Oldham Athletic	47	(1)
2012	→ Chorley (loan)	8	(0)
2014	→ Alfreton Town (loan)	7	(1)
2015	→ FC Halifax Town (loan)	0	(0)
2015–2016	Barrow	20	(0)
2016–	Harrisburg Heat (indoor)	82	(22)
- * Club domestic league appearances and goals as of 16 December 2022

David Anthony Mellor is an English footballer who plays for the Harrisburg Heat in the Major Arena Soccer League.

== Career ==
=== Oldham Athletic ===
Mellor joined Oldham Athletic as sixteen-year-old from Manchester United. However, Mellor suffered a knee injury, but was given a full-time two-year scholarships, having initially joined the club on a non-contract basis. After spending time in Oldham's youth team he made his competitive debut during the second match of the 2011–12 season, as a substitute in a Football League Cup match against Carlisle United. He scored sixteen minutes into his Football League debut on 16 August in a match against Scunthorpe.

On 28 August 2011 The People reported that Premier League Fulham manager Martin Jol was preparing a bid for teenager Mellor after scouts were impressed with his strength and maturity. Nothing came of this report however, and he remained at Oldham by signing his first professional contract with the club, keeping him until 2013. In October 2011, Oldham Athletic rejected a bid for Mellor from an unnamed club, which the club's captain Dean Furman was urgent for Mellor to stay at the club. However, Mellor's form at Oldham Athletic soon slumped because of family reasons and his own injury concern, though Mellor made his return to the first team against Carlisle United on the final game of the season. Despite the issues, Mellor made 21 appearances at the end of the season.

However, Mellor soon lost his first team place to Jonathan Grounds at the start of the 2012–13 season and in October 2012 he joined Chorley on loan for a one-month period and made his club debut on 16 October in a Northern Premier League match against AFC Fylde. After just nine appearances for Chorley, Mellor returned to his parent club on 19 November 2012. After his return, Mellor made his first appearance of the season on 19 January 2013, in a 2–1 loss against Coventry City. After making three appearances playing as a centre-midfielder against Bury, Yeovil Town and Crawley Town, Mellor signed a twelve-month contract with the club. Mellor stated he signed a contract with the club, citing Manager Lee Johnson gave him confidence in the first team.

At the start of the 2013–14 season, Mellor made two starts for the first two matches before suffering a hamstring against Walsall, though it was not serious. Mellor made his first team on 14 September 2013, against Rotherham United, only to be sent-off in the 41st minute, in a 3–2 loss. After serving three match ban, Mellor made his return, coming on as a substitute for Joseph Mills in the 62nd minute, in a 2–0 loss against Wolverhampton Wanderers on 22 October 2013. Mellor would be often used in first team ins and out throughout the second half of the season before a knee injury kept him sidelined throughout the season. Despite making twenty appearances in the 2013–14 season, the one-year option that the club had on Mellor's contract was exercised, extending his contract until the end of the 2014–15 season.

In the 2014–15 season, Mellor joined Alfreton Town for a one-month loan on 17 September 2014. Mellor made his Alfreton Town debut, in a 3–2 win over Telford United on 16 September 2014. Mellor scored his first Alfreton Town in three years, in a 1–0 win over Nuneaton Town on 20 September 2014. After scoring once in seven starts, Mellor made his return to his parent club on 21 October 2014. After making his return to his parent club, Mellor made his Oldham Athletic debut, coming on as a substitute for Carl Winchester in the 78th minute, in a 2–2 draw against Doncaster Rovers on 10 January 2015. Mellor made another appearance on 25 April 2015, making his first start of the season in a 2–0 loss against Walsall.

With Mellor only featuring twice all season for Oldham Athletic and seemingly falling out of favour, he joined FC Halifax Town on 2 February 2015 on loan until the end of the season. However, after one appearance for Halifax, Mellor's loan spell at the club was terminated. At the end of the 2014–15 season, Mellor was among five players to have been released by the club.

=== Barrow ===
On 18 June 2015 Mellor signed a two-year deal with Barrow AFC.On 2 September 2016 Mellor's contract was terminated after only appearing 26 times for Barrow, 5 of them were under the new manager Paul Cox

=== Harrisburg Heat ===
The Harrisburg Heat have signed midfielder Mellor to a growing roster of experienced players joining the 2017 team.

"I can't wait to start the season. I'm looking forward to a new challenge and I am ready to embrace it," said Mellor. "I'm excited to be a part of the club's new direction and I just want to show people what I can do on the pitch."

"David is a great player with size, speed, skill and the versatility we are looking for," said Harrisburg Heat CEO Carl Delmont.

"We are looking at a lot of great players to bring our fans quality soccer. This is one of several great signings we are announcing in the coming days," Delmont continued.
