= Dan Taylor (footballer, born 1993) =

English footballer

Personal information
- Date of birth: 17 March 1993 (age 33)
- Place of birth: Newcastle upon Tyne, England
- Position: Striker

Team information
- Current team: Spennymoor Town
- Number: 19

Youth career
- 2009–2011: Newcastle United

Senior career*
Years	Team	Apps	(Gls)
2011–2012	Newcastle United	0	(0)
2011–2012	→ Ashington (loan)	3	(4)
2012–2013	Oldham Athletic	8	(1)
2013–	Spennymoor Town	45	(22)
- * Club domestic league appearances and goals as of 11:58, 3 February 2013 (UTC)

Daniel Scott Taylor (born 17 March 1993) is an English footballer who plays for Spennymoor Town in the Northern League.

== Career ==
Born in Newcastle upon Tyne, Taylor joined the academy setup at Newcastle United in 2010 as a scholar. In the summer of 2011, he signed his first professional contract.

=== Oldham Athletic ===
On 18 June 2012, he joined Football League One side Oldham Athletic on a one-year deal, after being recommended by Peter Beardsley. His professional debut for Oldham came on 18 August 2011, in a 2–0 defeat to Milton Keynes Dons, replacing Jordan Slew as a substitute. He scored his first goal for the club against Crewe Alexandra on Boxing Day 2012 after coming on as a substitute.

Taylor was released by the club at the end of the 2012–13 season, after only managing to make several substitute appearances during his time with the club.
