= Sidney Schmeltz =

Dutch footballer

Personal information
- Full name: Sidney Schmeltz
- Date of birth: 8 June 1989 (age 37)
- Place of birth: Nieuwegein, Netherlands
- Height: 1.78 m (5 ft 10 in)
- Position: Winger

Team information
- Current team: Al-Ahli Manama

Youth career
- SV Geinoord
- RKC Waalwijk

Senior career*
Years	Team	Apps	(Gls)
2008–2010	Willem II	5	(0)
2010–2011	Almere City	33	(4)
2011–2012	Sparta Rotterdam	22	(2)
2012–2013	SC Veendam	26	(2)
2013–2014	Oldham Athletic	17	(0)
2014	→ Shrewsbury Town (loan)	4	(0)
2014	Hartlepool United	5	(0)
2015	Petrojet	1	(1)
2015–2016	Magreb '90	8	(0)
2016–	Al-Ahli Manama	0	(0)
- * Club domestic league appearances and goals as of 29 September 2016

Sidney Schmeltz (born 8 June 1989) is a Dutch footballer who currently plays for Al-Ahli Manama. He is a convert to Islam.

Schmeltz started his career with SV Geinoord in Nieuwegein, but was scouted by RKC Waalwijk on early age. August 2008 he switched to Willem II Tilburg. Despite he was not allowed to play yet, he made his debut for the Willem II reserve squad in a cup-match against RKC Waalwijk. Therefore, the Royal Dutch Football Association (KNVB) decided to play a rematch.

On 19 April 2009 Schmeltz made his first appearance in the Willem II First Squad in the home-match against ADO Den Haag (3–3), as a substitute for Sergio Zijler. Schmeltz appeared in the starting line-up for the first time two weeks later against Roda JC (0–1 win).

In August 2010, Schmeltz was signed by Almere City in a one-year deal. He left City after one season to play for Sparta Rotterdam, but was released despite an ongoing contract in the summer after it. He signed with SC Veendam, but became a free agent after the club's bankruptcy in March 2013.

In June 2013, Schmeltz signed a three-year deal with League One side Oldham Athletic.

On 10 January 2014, Schmeltz joined Shrewsbury Town on loan until the end of the season, making his debut the following day against Milton Keynes Dons. Schmeltz had his contract terminated with immediate effect in February 2014.

Schmeltz joined Hartlepool United on 31 October 2014 on a short-term deal and was released at the end of the year.
