= Kirk Millar =

Northern Irish footballer (born 1992)

Personal information
- Full name: Kirk Steven Millar
- Date of birth: 7 July 1992 (age 34)
- Place of birth: Belfast, Northern Ireland
- Height: 1.75 m (5 ft 9 in)
- Positions: Winger; striker

Team information
- Current team: Linfield
- Number: 7

Youth career
- –2009: Linfield
- 2009–: Oldham Athletic

Senior career*
Years	Team	Apps	(Gls)
2008–2009	Linfield	1	(0)
2009–2014	Oldham Athletic	35	(1)
2012	→ Chorley (loan)	8	(0)
2014–	Linfield	383	(50)

International career^{‡}
2010–2014	Northern Ireland U21	11	(0)
- * Club domestic league appearances and goals as of 29 April 2026 ‡ National team caps and goals as of 19:28, 9 September 2014 (UTC)

Kirk Steven Millar (born 7 July 1992) is a Northern Irish footballer who plays for NIFL Premiership side Linfield.

== Career ==
=== Oldham Athletic ===
He joined Oldham's Centre of Excellence as a first year scholar in May 2009, having previously been at Linfield from the age of ten, progressing to reserve team football at the age of fifteen and then making a first team appearance at the age of sixteen.

He made his Football League debut on 13 March 2010 as a substitute during a 2–2 draw with Wycombe Wanderers and started his first match for the club on 30 March in a 3–2 defeat against Brentford. He was offered a two-year professional contract by Oldham in April 2010, twelve months ahead of his scholarship expiring. Millar's chances of establishing a first team place for Oldham Athletic in the 2011–12 season were dealt a blow as he was sent off in a reserves team match against Morecambe for clashing with the keeper Lawrie Walker just after being told by the manager Paul Dickov that he was going to be given a chance to show his ability at the end of the 2010–11 season.

Millar had scarcely featured for Latics throughout the 2012–13 season but found a place in the team when Paul Dickov left the club and new man Lee Johnson arrived. Millar played a crucial part in Oldham's survival, assisting several goals, most notably Matt Smith's late winner against Bury FC at Gigg Lane. Millar scored his first & only goal for Oldham during the last game of the season against Leyton Orient, slotting the ball into the bottom right hand corner to make it 1–1.

At the end of the 2013–14 season, a season in which he was limited to a few substitute appearances, Millar was released after 6 years at the club.

=== Chorley (Loan) ===
In October 2012 he joined Chorley on loan for a one-month period and made his club debut on 16 October in a Northern Premier League match against AFC Fylde.

Millar made a guest appearance and scored for Shamrock Rovers in a friendly against Wolves in July 2014 at Tallaght Stadium.

=== Linfield ===
In August 2014, Linfield manager Warren Feeney announced the signing of Millar on a free transfer. Millar signed a 2-year contract following a trial period with the club.

=== International career ===
In February 2011 Millar received a call-up to the Northern Ireland Under-21 team On 9 February 2011 Millar received his first cap coming on as a second-half substitute against Wales Under-21. On 13 May 2011, Millar was called up for stand-bye for the Northern Ireland U-21 in their euro qualifier against Faroe Islands Under-21.

In June 2011 he received his first call-up to the Northern Ireland Under-20 team, along with teammate Carl Winchester for July's Milk Cup tournament.

== Career statistics ==
As of 10 December 2022.

Appearances and goals by club, season and competition
Club	Season	League			Cup (Note: Appearances in the FA Cup and Irish Cup.)		League Cup (Note: Appearances in the EFL Cup and Northern Irish League Cup.)		Continental		Other		Total	
Club	Season	Division	Apps	Goals	Apps	Goals	Apps	Goals	Apps	Goals	Apps	Goals	Apps	Goals
Linfield	2008–09	IFA Premiership	1	0	0	0	0	0	—		—		1	0
Oldham Athletic	2009–10	League One	6	0	0	0	0	0	—		—		6	0
Oldham Athletic	2010–11	League One	4	0	0	0	0	0	—		—		4	0
Oldham Athletic	2011–12	League One	4	0	0	0	0	0	—		1 (Note: Appearances in the EFL Trophy.)	0	5	0
Oldham Athletic	2012–13	League One	12	1	1	0	0	0	—		1	0	14	1
Oldham Athletic	2013–14	League One	9	0	1	0	1	0	—		1	0	12	0
Oldham Athletic	Total		35	1	2	0	1	0	—		3	0	41	1
Coleraine (loan)	2009–10	IFA Premiership	1	0	0	0	0	0	—		—		1	0
Chorley (loan)	2012–13	Northern Premier League	8	0	0	0	0	0	—		1	1	9	1
Linfield	2014–15	NIFL Premiership	21	0	2	0	1	0	—		—		24	0
Linfield	2015–16	NIFL Premiership	34	7	5	0	2	0	1 (Note: Appearances in the UEFA Europa League.)	0	—		42	7
Linfield	2016–17	NIFL Premiership	33	4	2	0	1	0	2	0	1 (Note: Appearances in the Scottish Challenge Cup.)	0	36	4
Linfield	2017–18	NIFL Premiership	37	3	2	0	2	0	1 (Note: Appearances in the UEFA Champions League.)	0	2	0	41	3
Linfield	2018–19	NIFL Premiership	35	2	0	0	3	1	—		—		38	3
Linfield	2019–20	NIFL Premiership	28	8	1	0	4	0	8	2	3	1	44	11
Linfield	2020–21	NIFL Premiership	37	6	4	0	0	0	2	0	2	0	45	6
Linfield	2021–22	NIFL Premiership	34	3	2	0	3	0	5	0	1	0	45	3
Linfield	2022–23	NIFL Premiership	14	3	0	0	3	1	7	1	5	0	29	5
Linfield	Total		273	36	18	0	19	2	26	3	14	1	346	42
Career total			318	37	20	0	20	2	26	3	18	2	402	44
