= 2010–11 Oldham Athletic A.F.C. season =

Oldham Athletic
2010–11 season
- Chairman: Simon Corney
- Manager: Paul Dickov
- Stadium: Boundary Park
- League One: 18th
- FA Cup: First round
- League Cup: First round
- Football League Trophy: First round
- Top goalscorer: League: Chris Taylor (11); All: Chris Taylor (11)
- Highest home attendance: 8,564 (15 February vs Carlisle United)
- Lowest home attendance: 2,703 (31 August vs Shrewsbury Town)
- Average home league attendance: 4,392
| Home colours | Away colours | Third colours |

The 2011–12 season was the 14th consecutive season in the third tier of the English football league system played by Oldham Athletic Association Football Club, a professional association football club based in Oldham, Greater Manchester, England.

== League table ==
| Pos | Team | Pld | W | D | L | GF | GA | GD | Pts |
|---|---|---|---|---|---|---|---|---|---|
| 15 | Sheffield Wednesday | 46 | 16 | 10 | 20 | 67 | 67 | 0 | 58 |
| 16 | Hartlepool United | 46 | 15 | 12 | 19 | 47 | 65 | −18 | 57 |
| 17 | Oldham Athletic | 46 | 13 | 17 | 16 | 53 | 60 | −7 | 56 |
| 18 | Tranmere Rovers | 46 | 15 | 11 | 20 | 53 | 60 | −7 | 56 |
| 19 | Notts County | 46 | 14 | 8 | 24 | 46 | 60 | −14 | 50 |

Updated to match(es) played on 2 May 2011. Source: BBC
Rules for classification: 1) points; 2) goal difference; 3) number of goals scored.

== Squad statistics ==
=== First-team squad ===
Includes all players who were awarded squad numbers during the season.

Note: Flags indicate national team as defined under FIFA eligibility rules; some limited exceptions apply. Players may hold more than one non-FIFA nationality.

| No. | Pos. | Nation | Player |
|---|---|---|---|
| 1 | GK | ENG | Dean Brill |
| 2 | DF | FRA | Jean-Yves Mvoto (from Aug 2010) |
| 3 | DF | WAL | Joe Jacobson (until Jan 2011) |
| 4 | MF | ENG | Jon Worthington (until Jan 2011) |
| 4 | DF | ENG | Andy Todd (from Jan 2011) |
| 5 | MF | ENG | Andy Holdsworth (until Jan 2011) |
| 6 | DF | ENG | Reuben Hazell (Captain) |
| 7 | MF | ENG | Ritchie Jones |
| 8 | FW | ENG | Deane Smalley |
| 9 | FW | POL | Paweł Abbott (until Jul 2010) |
| 9 | FW | EIR | Dean Kelly (between Jul 2010 and Jan 2011) |
| 9 | FW | ENG | Reuben Reid (from Jan 2011) |
| 10 | MF | ENG | Rob Purdie (until Jan 2011) |
| 11 | MF | ENG | Jason Jarrett (until Jan 2011) |
| 11 | MF | ENG | Sam Mantom (between Feb and Mar 2011) |
| 11 | MF | ENG | Jason Lowe (from Mar 2011) |
| 12 | DF | ENG | Kelvin Lomax (until Jan 2011) |
| 12 | DF | CGO | Medi Adalimba (between Jan and Mar 2011) |
| 13 | GK | SCO | Greg Fleming (until Jan 2011) |
| 14 | MF | RSA | Dean Furman |
| 15 | FW | ENG | Lewis Alessandra |
| 16 | DF | ENG | Sean Gregan (until Jan 2011) |
| 16 | GK | ENG | Ben Amos (between Jan and Mar 2011) |
| 17 | FW | NIR | Warren Feeney |
| 18 | MF | ENG | Chris Taylor |
| 19 | MF | ENG | Kieran Lee |
| 20 | MF | ENG | Dale Stephens |

| No. | Pos. | Nation | Player |
|---|---|---|---|
| 21 | DF | ENG | Paul Black |
| 22 | FW | ENG | Ryan Brooke |
| 23 | GK | ENG | Josh Ollerenshaw |
| 24 | MF | NIR | Kirk Millar |
| 25 | MF | ENG | Joe Colbeck (until Jul 2010) |
| 25 | MF | COD | Rodrigue Dikaba (between Aug and Oct 2010) |
| 25 | FW | POR | Filipe Morais (from Oct 2010) |
| 26 | FW | COD | Djeny Bembo-Leta |
| 27 | MF | NIR | Phillip McGrath |
| 28 | FW | ENG | Tom Eaves (until Aug 2010) |
| 28 | GK | ENG | Paul Gerrard (Player/Coach) |
| 29 | FW | SCO | Paul Dickov (Player/Manager) |
| 30 | DF | HUN | Ferenc Fodor (until Jan 2011) |
| 30 | MF | ENG | Connor Hughes (from Apr 2011) |
| 31 | GK | HUN | Tamas Floszman (until Jan 2011) |
| 31 | DF | ENG | James Tarkowski (from Jan 2011) |
| 32 | DF | ENG | Matthew D Carr |
| 33 | MF | ENG | Andy Crompton (until Apr 2011) |
| 33 | MF | ENG | David Mellor (from Apr 2011) |
| 34 | DF | ENG | Rod McDonald |
| 35 | DF | CMR | Cedric Evina (from Oct 2010) |
| 36 | FW | FRA | Oumare Tounkara (from Aug 2010) |
| 37 | DF | NIR | Carl Winchester (from Nov 2010) |
| 38 | DF | FRA | Jean-François Christophe (between Sept and Nov 2010) |
| 38 | MF | NIR | Ryan Burns (from Nov 2010) |
| 39 | MF | ENG | Aidan White (from Nov 2010) |
| 41 | DF | ENG | Neal Trotman (from Nov 2010) |

=== Appearances and goals ===
As of 7 May 2011

| No. | Pos | Nat | Player | Total | | League One | | FA Cup | | League Cup | | JP Trophy | |
| No. | Pos | Nat | Player | Apps | Goals | Apps | Goals | Apps | Goals | Apps | Goals | Apps | Goals |
|---|---|---|---|---|---|---|---|---|---|---|---|---|---|
| 1 | GK | (England) ENG | Dean Brill | 33 | 0 | 30+0 | 0 | 1+0 | 0 | 1+0 | 0 | 1+0 | 0 |
| 2 | DF | (France) FRA | Jean-Yves Mvoto | 30 | 2 | 25+2 | 2 | 1+0 | 0 | 1+0 | 0 | 1+0 | 0 |
| 3 | DF | (Wales) WAL | Joe Jacobson | 1 | 0 | 0+1 | 0 | 0+0 | 0 | 0+0 | 0 | 0+0 | 0 |
| 4 | DF | (England) ENG | Andy Todd | 6 | 0 | 5+1 | 0 | 0+0 | 0 | 0+0 | 0 | 0+0 | 0 |
| 6 | DF | (England) ENG | Reuben Hazell | 35 | 0 | 33+0 | 0 | 1+0 | 0 | 0+0 | 0 | 1+0 | 0 |
| 7 | MF | (England) ENG | Ritchie Jones | 33 | 1 | 21+10 | 1 | 1+0 | 0 | 1+0 | 0 | 0+0 | 0 |
| 8 | FW | (England) ENG | Deane Smalley | 4 | 0 | 0+3 | 0 | 0+0 | 0 | 0+0 | 0 | 1+0 | 0 |
| 9 | FW | (Ireland) EIR | Dean Kelly | 15 | 1 | 1+12 | 1 | 0+0 | 0 | 1+0 | 0 | 1+0 | 0 |
| 9 | FW | (England) ENG | Reuben Reid | 19 | 2 | 11+8 | 2 | 0+0 | 0 | 0+0 | 0 | 0+0 | 0 |
| 11 | DF | (England) ENG | Jason Jarrett | 10 | 0 | 7+1 | 0 | 1+0 | 0 | 1+0 | 0 | 0+0 | 0 |
| 11 | MF | (England) ENG | Sam Mantom | 4 | 0 | 3+1 | 0 | 0+0 | 0 | 0+0 | 0 | 0+0 | 0 |
| 11 | MF | (England) ENG | Jason Lowe | 7 | 2 | 7+0 | 2 | 0+0 | 0 | 0+0 | 0 | 0+0 | 0 |
| 14 | MF | (South Africa) RSA | Dean Furman | 44 | 5 | 42+0 | 5 | 0+0 | 0 | 1+0 | 0 | 1+0 | 0 |
| 15 | FW | (England) ENG | Lewis Alessandra | 21 | 1 | 10+9 | 1 | 0+1 | 0 | 1+0 | 0 | 0+0 | 0 |
| 16 | DF | (England) ENG | Sean Gregan | 1 | 0 | 0+1 | 0 | 0+0 | 0 | 0+0 | 0 | 0+0 | 0 |
| 16 | GK | (England) ENG | Ben Amos | 16 | 0 | 16+0 | 0 | 0+0 | 0 | 0+0 | 0 | 0+0 | 0 |
| 17 | FW | (Northern Ireland) NIR | Warren Feeney | 24 | 1 | 13+10 | 0 | 0+1 | 1 | 0+0 | 0 | 0+0 | 0 |
| 18 | MF | (England) ENG | Chris Taylor | 45 | 11 | 41+1 | 11 | 1+0 | 0 | 0+1 | 0 | 1+0 | 0 |
| 19 | DF | (England) ENG | Kieran Lee | 45 | 2 | 43+0 | 2 | 0+0 | 0 | 1+0 | 0 | 1+0 | 0 |
| 20 | MF | (England) ENG | Dale Stephens | 37 | 10 | 34+0 | 9 | 1+0 | 1 | 1+0 | 0 | 1+0 | 0 |
| 21 | DF | (England) ENG | Paul Black | 32 | 0 | 28+1 | 0 | 1+0 | 0 | 1+0 | 0 | 1+0 | 0 |
| 22 | FW | (England) ENG | Ryan Brooke | 13 | 0 | 2+11 | 0 | 0+0 | 0 | 0+0 | 0 | 0+0 | 0 |
| 24 | MF | (Northern Ireland) NIR | Kirk Millar | 5 | 0 | 0+5 | 0 | 0+0 | 0 | 0+0 | 0 | 0+0 | 0 |
| 25 | MF | (Democratic Republic of the Congo) COD | Rodrigue Dikaba | 2 | 0 | 1+0 | 0 | 0+0 | 0 | 0+0 | 0 | 0+1 | 0 |
| 25 | MF | (Portugal) POR | Filipe Morais | 24 | 3 | 20+3 | 3 | 0+1 | 0 | 0+0 | 0 | 0+0 | 0 |
| 26 | FW | (Democratic Republic of the Congo) COD | Djeny Bembo-Leta | 5 | 1 | 2+1 | 0 | 0+0 | 0 | 1+0 | 1 | 1+0 | 0 |
| 27 | MF | (Northern Ireland) NIR | Phillip McGrath | 1 | 0 | 0+1 | 0 | 0+0 | 0 | 0+0 | 0 | 0+0 | 0 |
| 29 | FW | (Scotland) SCO | Paul Dickov | 2 | 0 | 0+2 | 0 | 0+0 | 0 | 0+0 | 0 | 0+0 | 0 |
| 31 | DF | (England) ENG | James Tarkowski | 9 | 0 | 7+2 | 0 | 0+0 | 0 | 0+0 | 0 | 0+0 | 0 |
| 33 | MF | (England) ENG | Andy Crompton | 1 | 0 | 0+0 | 0 | 0+0 | 0 | 0+1 | 0 | 0+0 | 0 |
| 34 | DF | (England) ENG | Rod McDonald | 1 | 0 | 0+0 | 0 | 0+0 | 0 | 0+0 | 0 | 0+1 | 0 |
| 35 | DF | (Cameroon) CMR | Cedric Evina | 28 | 2 | 24+3 | 2 | 1+0 | 0 | 0+0 | 0 | 0+0 | 0 |
| 36 | FW | (France) FRA | Oumare Tounkara | 45 | 7 | 40+4 | 7 | 1+0 | 0 | 0+0 | 0 | 0+0 | 0 |
| 37 | DF | (Northern Ireland) NIR | Carl Winchester | 7 | 1 | 5+1 | 1 | 1+0 | 0 | 0+0 | 0 | 0+0 | 0 |
| 38 | DF | (France) FRA | Jean-François Christophe | 1 | 0 | 0+1 | 0 | 0+0 | 0 | 0+0 | 0 | 0+0 | 0 |
| 38 | MF | (Northern Ireland) NIR | Ryan Burns | 1 | 0 | 1+0 | 0 | 0+0 | 0 | 0+0 | 0 | 0+0 | 0 |
| 39 | DF | (England) ENG | Aidan White | 24 | 4 | 19+5 | 4 | 0+0 | 0 | 0+0 | 0 | 0+0 | 0 |
| 41 | DF | (England) ENG | Neal Trotman | 18 | 0 | 15+3 | 0 | 0+0 | 0 | 0+0 | 0 | 0+0 | 0 |

=== Top scorers ===
| Position | Nation | Number | Name | League One | League Cup | FA Cup | Football League Trophy | Total |
|---|---|---|---|---|---|---|---|---|
| 1 | (England) | 18 | Chris Taylor | 11 | 0 | 0 | 0 | 11 |
| 2 | (England) | 20 | Dale Stephens | 9 | 0 | 1 | 0 | 10 |
| 3 | (France) | 36 | Oumare Tounkara | 7 | 0 | 0 | 0 | 7 |
| 4 | (South Africa) | 14 | Dean Furman | 5 | 0 | 0 | 0 | 5 |
| 5 | (England) | 39 | Aidan White | 4 | 0 | 0 | 0 | 4 |
| 6 | (Portugal) | 25 | Filipe Morais | 3 | 0 | 0 | 0 | 3 |
| 7 | (Cameroon) | 35 | Cedric Evina | 2 | 0 | 0 | 0 | 2 |
| = | (England) | 19 | Kieran Lee | 2 | 0 | 0 | 0 | 2 |
| = | (England) | 11 | Jason Lowe | 2 | 0 | 0 | 0 | 2 |
| = | (France) | 2 | Jean-Yves Mvoto | 2 | 0 | 0 | 0 | 2 |
| = | (England) | 9 | Reuben Reid | 2 | 0 | 0 | 0 | 2 |
| 8 | (England) | 15 | Lewis Alessandra | 1 | 0 | 0 | 0 | 1 |
| = | (Democratic Republic of the Congo) | 26 | Djeny Bembo-Leta | 0 | 1 | 0 | 0 | 1 |
| = | (Northern Ireland) | 17 | Warren Feeney | 0 | 0 | 1 | 0 | 1 |
| = | (England) | 7 | Ritchie Jones | 1 | 0 | 0 | 0 | 1 |
| = | (Republic of Ireland) | 9 | Dean Kelly | 1 | 0 | 0 | 0 | 1 |
| = | (Northern Ireland) | 37 | Carl Winchester | 1 | 0 | 0 | 0 | 1 |
| | | | TOTALS | 53 | 1 | 2 | 0 | 56 |

== Transfers ==
=== In ===
| Pos | Name | From | Fee |
|---|---|---|---|
| FW | Dean Kelly | Crumlin United | Unknown |
| MF | Filipe Morais | Unattached | Free Transfer |
| FW | Paul Dickov | Leeds United | Free Transfer |
| FW | Warren Feeney | Cardiff City | Free Transfer |
| MF | Jason Jarrett | Unattached | Free Transfer |
| MF | Ritchie Jones | Hartlepool United | Free Transfer |
| GK | Paul Gerrard | Unattached | Free Transfer |
| DF | Rodrigue Dikaba | Unattached | Free Transfer |
| MF | Jean-Francois Christophe | Unattached | Free Transfer |

=== Out ===
| Pos | Name | To | Fee |
|---|---|---|---|
| GK | Przemyslaw Kazimierczak | Flota Świnoujście | Free Transfer |
| DF | Rodrigue Dikaba | Unattached | Released |
| DF | Ferenc Fodor | Unattached | Released |
| DF | Sean Gregan | Fleetwood Town | Released |
| MF | Jean-Francois Christophe | AFC Compiègne | Released |
| MF | Joe Colbeck | Hereford United | Free Transfer |
| MF | Jason Jarrett | Unattached | Unknown |
| MF | Danny Whitaker | Chesterfield | Free Transfer |
| FW | Paweł Abbott | Charlton Athletic | Nominal |
| FW | Dean Kelly | Unattached | Unknown |
| FW | Tom Eaves | Bolton Wanderers | Undisclosed |

=== Loaned in ===
| Pos | Name | From | End date |
|---|---|---|---|
| DF | Aidy White | Leeds United | 3 January 2011 |
| DF | Neal Trotman | Preston North End | 30 June 2011 |
| FW | Oumare Tounkara | Sunderland | 30 June 2011 |
| DF | Jean-Yves Mvoto | Sunderland | 30 June 2011 |
| DF | Cedric Evina | Arsenal | 3 January 2011 |
| GK | Tamas Floszman | Honved | 3 January 2011 |
| GK | Ben Amos | Manchester United | 30 June 2011 |

=== Loaned out ===
| Pos | Name | To | End date |
|---|---|---|---|
| GK | Josh Ollerenshaw | Mossley | 28 November 2010 |
| GK | Josh Ollerenshaw | Salford City | 18 February 2011 |
| DF | Ferenc Fodor | Northwich Victoria | 24 November 2010 |
| DF | Sean Gregan | Fleetwood Town | 20 January 2011 |
| DF | Joe Jacobson | Accrington Stanley | 29 January 2011 |
| DF | Kelvin Lomax | Chesterfield | 31 January 2011 |
| DF | Rod McDonald | Stafford Rangers | 29 November 2010 |
| MF | Rob Purdie | Hereford United | 29 January 2011 |
| MF | Jon Worthington | Fleetwood Town | 2 January 2011 |
| FW | Deane Smalley | Rochdale | 23 October 2010 |
| FW | Deane Smalley | Chesterfield | 31 January 2011 |

== Results ==
=== Friendlies ===
| 10 July 2010 | Barrow | 0–2 | Oldham Athletic | Barrow-in-Furness |
| | | | | Stadium: Holker Street |

| 12 July 2010 | Oldham Athletic | 1–2 | Burnley | Oldham |
| | | | | Stadium: Boundary Park |

| 17 July 2010 | Oldham Athletic | 0–2 | Falkirk | Wincham |
| | | | | Stadium: Victoria Stadium |

| 20 July 2010 | Oldham Athletic | 1–1 | Wigan Athletic | Oldham |
| | | | | Stadium: Boundary Park |

| 24 July 2010 | Liverpool | 3–0 | Oldham Athletic | Leyland |
| | | | | Stadium: County Ground |

| 28 July 2010 | Oldham Athletic | 3–0 | Bolton Wanderers | Oldham |
| | | | | Stadium: Boundary Park |

| 31 July 2010 | Oldham Athletic | 1–0 | Preston North End | Oldham |
| | | | | Stadium: Boundary Park |

=== League One ===
| 7 August 2010 1 | Tranmere Rovers | 1–2 | Oldham Athletic | Birkenhead |
| | Thomas-Moore 89'; Labadie (yellow card) 89' | Report | Stephens 27', 81' (yellow card) 90'; Hazell (yellow card) 79'; Jarrett (yellow card) 90' | Stadium: Prenton Park; Attendance: 7,270 (1,764 visitors); Referee: G Salisbury |

| 14 August 2010 2 | Oldham Athletic | 3–0 | Notts County | Oldham |
| | Furman 31'; Tounkara (yellow card) 36' (goal) 66'; Lee 87' | Report | Pearce (yellow card) 54' | Stadium: Boundary Park; Attendance: 5,037 (695 visitors); Referee: C Webster |

| 21 August 2010 3 | Charlton Athletic | 1–1 | Oldham Athletic | Charlton, London |
| | Wagstaff 24' (yellow card) 81' | Report | Furman 45'; Jarrett (yellow card) 16' (yellow-red card) 87' | Stadium: The Valley; Attendance: 14,842; Referee: R Shoebridge |

| 28 August 2010 4 | Oldham Athletic | 0–0 | Yeovil Town | Oldham |
| | Furman (yellow card) 43'; Hazell (yellow card) 72' | Report | Welsh (yellow card) 23'; Virgo (yellow card) 27' | Stadium: Boundary Park; Attendance: 4,180 (168 visitors); Referee: Oliver Langford |

| 4 September 2010 5 | Oldham Athletic | 1–1 | Bristol Rovers | Oldham |
| | Taylor 45'; Dickov (yellow card) 90' | Report | Regan (yellow card) 3'; Hoskins 8'; Coles (yellow card) 48' (yellow-red card) 86'; Lines (yellow card) 80'; Green (yellow card) 90' | Stadium: Boundary Park; Attendance: 4,039 (219 visitors); Referee: Geoff Eltringham |

| 11 September 2010 6 | Peterborough United | 5–2 | Oldham Athletic | Peterborough |
| | Tomlin (yellow card) 61'; Wesolowski 45'; McLean 62' (yellow card) 62'; Boyd 71'; Hibbert 82'; Mendez-Laing (yellow card) 87'; McCann 90+6' (pen.) | Report | Lee (yellow card) 45'; Jones 19' (yellow card) 62'; Taylor 38'; Jarrett (yellow card) 75'; Furman (yellow card) 86' | Stadium: London Road; Attendance: 6,337 (381 visitors); Referee: G Horwood |

| 18 September 2010 7 | Oldham Athletic | 2–1 | Bournemouth | Oldham |
| | Hazell (yellow card) 35'; Lee 78'; Feeney (yellow card) 63'; Tounkara 81' | Report | Wiggins (yellow card) 12' (goal) 45+2' | Stadium: Boundary Park; Attendance: 3,912 (285 visitors); Referee: C Pawson |

| 25 September 2010 8 | Brighton & Hove Albion | 2–1 | Oldham Athletic | Brighton |
| | Barnes 44' (yellow card) 67'; Kishishev (yellow card) 64'; Sandaza 90+6' | Report | Alessandra 30'; Taylor (yellow card) 34'; Black (yellow card) 47'; Lee (yellow card) 55'; Mvoto (yellow card) 67'; Furman (yellow card) 87' | Stadium: Withdean Stadium; Attendance: 7,148 (152 visitors); Referee: Andy Penn |

| 28 September 2010 9 | Sheffield Wednesday | 0–0 | Oldham Athletic | Owlerton, Sheffield |
| | Coke (yellow card) 32'; O'Connor (yellow card) 34'; Purse (yellow card) 51' | Report | Hazell (yellow card) 66'; Tounkara (yellow card) 80' | Stadium: Hillsborough Stadium; Attendance: 16,609; Referee: D Webb |

| 2 October 2010 10 | Oldham Athletic | 1–1 | Leyton Orient | Oldham |
| | Taylor 40' | | McGleish 79' | Stadium: Boundary Park; Attendance: 3,806 (144 visitors); Referee: Bobby Madley |

| 9 October 2010 11 | Brentford | 1–3 | Oldham Athletic | Brentford, London |
| | Weston 4' | | Furman 14'; Taylor 46'; Stephens 65' | Stadium: Griffin Park; Attendance: 5,339 (322 visitors); Referee: Keith Stroud |

| 16 October 2010 12 | Oldham Athletic | 0–0 | Colchester United | Oldham |
| | | Report | | Stadium: Boundary Park; Attendance: 4,136 |

| 23 October 2010 13 | Southampton | 2–1 | Oldham Athletic | Southampton |
| | Fonte 45'; Oxlade-Chamberlain 73' | REport | Dean Furman 22' | Stadium: St Mary's Stadium; Attendance: 20,968; Referee: Andy D'Urso |

| 30 October 2010 14 | Oldham Athletic | 4–2 | Plymouth Argyle | Oldham |
| | Stephens 5' (pen.); Tounkara 64'; Mvoto 90'; Kelly 90' | Report | Noone 7'; Wright-Phillips 48'; N'Gala (red card) 18'; Árnason (red card) 45' | Stadium: Boundary Park; Attendance: 4,080; Referee: Ilderton |

| 13 November 2010 15 | Oldham Athletic | 1–0 | Huddersfield Town | Oldham |
| 15:00 | Tounkare 24' | Report | | Stadium: Boundary Park; Attendance: 7,723; Referee: Hooper |

| 20 November 2010 16 | Dagenham & Redbridge | 0–1 | Oldham Athletic | Dagenham, London |
| 15:00 | | Report | White 57' | Stadium: Victoria Road; Attendance: 2,239; Referee: Wright |

| 23 November 2010 17 | Oldham Athletic | 3–3 | Exeter City | Oldham |
| 19:45 | White 8'; Tounkare 17'; Taylor 42' | Report | Logan 77'; Cureton 85'; Nardiello 89' | Stadium: Boundary Park; Attendance: 3,561; Referee: Coote |

| 27 November 2010 18 | Rochdale | 1–1 | Oldham Athletic | Rochdale |
| 15:00 | Done 36' | | Evina 16' | Stadium: Spotland Stadium; Attendance: 6,483 |

| 1 January 2011 19 | Hartlepool United | 4–2 | Oldham Athletic | Hartlepool |
| 15:00 | Austin 27' (pen.); Hartley 45'; Humphreys 58'; Sweeney 69' | | Stephens 18'; Mvoto 81' | Stadium: Victoria Park; Attendance: 3,411 |

| 3 January 2011 20 | Oldham Athletic | 1–2 | Rochdale | Oldham |
| 15:00 | Furman 87' | | O'Grady 64', 76'; Wiseman (red card) 85' | Stadium: Boundary Park; Attendance: 7,251 |

| 8 January 2011 21 | Oldham Athletic | 2–0 | Swindon Town | Oldham |
| 15:00 | Taylor 4'; Stephens 88' (pen.) | | | Stadium: Boundary Park; Attendance: 3,573 |

| 11 January 2011 22 | Oldham Athletic | 0–6 | Southampton | Oldham |
| 19:45 | | | Oxlade-Chamberlain 9'; Lallana 38'; Guly 52'; Chaplow 69'; Lambert 74'; Barnard 86' | Stadium: Boundary Park; Attendance: 3,767 |

| 15 January 2011 23 | Plymouth Argyle | 0–2 | Oldham Athletic | Plymouth |
| 15:00 | | | Stephens 47'; Tounkara 72' | Stadium: Home Park; Attendance: 8,106 |

| 22 January 2011 24 | Oldham Athletic | 2–1 | Brentford | Oldham |
| 15:00 | Tounkara 40'; Morais 70' | | Simpson 82' | Stadium: Boundary Park; Attendance: 3,759 |

| 25 January 2011 25 | Walsall | 1–1 | Oldham Athletic | Walsall |
| 19:45 | Westlake 61' | | Morais 39' | Stadium: Bescot Stadium; Attendance: 3,247 |

| 29 January 2011 26 | Carlisle United | 2–2 | Oldham Athletic | Carlisle |
| 15:00 | Zoko 75'; Berrett 90' (pen.) | | White 8'; Taylor 33' | Stadium: Brunton Park; Attendance: 5,389 |

| 1 February 2011 27 | Oldham Athletic | 4–0 | Hartlepool United | Oldham |
| 19:45 | White 7'; Taylor 51'; Evina 69'; Reid 90' | | | Stadium: Boundary Park; Attendance: 3,056 |

| 5 February 2011 28 | Oldham Athletic | 1–1 | Dagenham & Redbridge | Oldham |
| 15:00 | Stephens 50' | | Vincelot 73'; Gain (red card) 90' | Stadium: Boundary Park; Attendance: 4,121 |

| 12 February 2011 29 | Huddersfield Town | 0–0 | Oldham Athletic | Huddersfield |
| 15:00 | | | | Stadium: Kirklees Stadium; Attendance: 16,176 |

| 15 February 2011 30 | Oldham Athletic | 0–1 | Carlisle United | Oldham |
| 19:45 | | | Curran 80' | Stadium: Boundary Park; Attendance: 8,564 |

| 19 February 2011 31 | Bristol Rovers | 1–0 | Oldham Athletic | Bristol |
| 15:00 | Howe 73' | Report | | Stadium: Memorial Stadium; Attendance: 5,379; Referee: Crossley |

| 22 February 2011 32 | Milton Keynes Dons | 0–0 | Oldham Athletic | Bletchley, Milton Keynes |
| 19:45 | | Report | | Stadium: Stadium MK; Attendance: 7,806; Referee: Williamson |

| 26 February 2011 33 | Oldham Athletic | 0–5 | Peterborough United | Oldham |
| 15:00 | | | Rowe 49'; Ball 52'; Zakuani 61'; Mackail-Smith 68', 83' | Stadium: Boundary Park; Attendance: 4,263 |

| 5 March 2011 34 | Bournemouth | 3–0 | Oldham Athletic | Bournemouth |
| 15:00 | Hollands 20'; Symes 47'; Dalla Valle 80' | | | Stadium: Dean Court; Attendance: 7,075 |

| 8 March 2011 35 | Oldham Athletic | 2–3 | Sheffield Wednesday | Oldham |
| 19:45 | Morais 22'; Stephens 45+1' | | Beevers 3'; Sedgwick 68', 83' | Stadium: Boundary Park; Attendance: 4,133 |

| 12 March 2011 36 | Leyton Orient | 1–0 | Oldham Athletic | Leyton, London |
| 15:00 | M'Poku 87' | | | Stadium: Brisbane Road; Attendance: 4,349 |

| 19 March 2011 37 | Oldham Athletic | 0–1 | Brighton & Hove Albion | Oldham |
| 15:00 | | | Barness 67' | Stadium: Boundary Park; Attendance: 3,863 |

| 22 March 2011 38 | Colchester United | 1–0 | Oldham Athletic | Colchester |
| 19:45 | Vincent 52' | | | Stadium: Colchester Community Stadium; Attendance: 2,892 |

| 28 March 2011 39 | Oldham Athletic | 0–0 | Tranmere Rovers | Oldham |
| 19:45 | | | | Stadium: Boundary Park; Attendance: 3,114 |

| 2 April 2011 40 | Notts County | 0–2 | Oldham Athletic | Nottingham |
| 15:00 | | | Lowe 87' (pen.); Reid 90+3' | Stadium: Meadow Lane; Attendance: 5,538; Referee: Bobby Madley |

| 9 April 2011 41 | Oldham Athletic | 0–0 | Charlton Athletic | Oldham |
| 15:00 | | | | Stadium: Boundary Park; Attendance: 3,562; Referee: K Wright |

| 16 April 2011 42 | Yeovil Town | 1–1 | Oldham Athletic | Yeovil |
| 15:00 | Welsh 85' | | Taylor 17' | Stadium: Huish Park; Attendance: 3,350; Referee: T Kettle |

| 22 April 2011 43 | Exeter City | 2–0 | Oldham Athletic | Exeter |
| 15:00 | Golbourne 34'; Cureton 42' | | | Stadium: St James Park; Attendance: 5,458; Referee: J Waugh |

| 25 April 2011 44 | Oldham Athletic | 1–1 | Walsall | Oldham |
| 15:00 | Williams 58' | | Lowe 88' | Stadium: Boundary Park; Attendance: 3,463; Referee: Darren Drysdale |

| 30 April 2011 45 | Swindon Town | 0–2 | Oldham Athletic | Swindon |
| 15:00 | | | Taylor 17'; Taylor 65' | Stadium: County Ground; Attendance: 7,420; Referee: Michael Naylor |

| 7 May 2011 46 | Oldham Athletic | 1–2 | Milton Keynes Dons | Oldham |
| 15:00 | Winchester 34' | | Balanta 28'; Marsh-Brown 50' | Stadium: Boundary Park; Attendance: 4,063; Referee: Phil Gibbs |

=== FA Cup ===
| 6 November 2010 | Accrington Stanley | 3–2 | Oldham Athletic | Accrington |
| 15:00 | Putterill 8', 52'; Ryan 36' | | Feeney 69'; Stephens 75' (pen.) | Stadium: Crown Ground; Attendance: 2,275 |

=== League Cup ===
| 10 August 2010 first round | Scunthorpe United | 2–1 | Oldham Athletic | Scunthorpe |
| | Forte 65'; Woolford 83'; Togwell (red card) 90+2' | | Bembo-Leta 23' | Stadium: Glanford Park; Attendance: 2,602 (273 visitors); Referee: Steve Rushton |

=== Football League Trophy ===
| 31 August 2010 first round north | Oldham Athletic | 0–1 | Shrewsbury Town | Oldham |
| | | | Leslie 83' | Stadium: Boundary Park; Attendance: 2,703 (265 visitors); Referee: G Sutton |
