= 2011–12 Oldham Athletic A.F.C. season =

Oldham Athletic A.F.C.
2011–12 season
- Chairman: Simon Corney
- Manager: Paul Dickov
- League One: 16th
- FA Cup: Third round
- League Cup: First round
- Football League Trophy: Northern section final
- Top goalscorer: League: Shefki Kuqi (11); All: Shefki Kuqi (16)
- Highest home attendance: 8,032 (6 August vs Sheffield United)
- Lowest home attendance: 1,786 (9 August vs Carlisle United)
- Average home league attendance: 5,012
Home colours	Away colours	Third colours

The 2011–12 season was Oldham Athletic's 15th consecutive season in the third tier of the English football league system. The team was managed by Paul Dickov and captained by Dean Furman following the departure of the previous captain, Reuben Hazell after the 2010–11 season.

As well as Hazell's departure, a number of other players, including goalkeeper Dean Brill, former youth team players Lewis Alessandra and Deane Smalley and highly rated midfielder Dale Stephens left the Latics before the start of the season. In their place, Dickov signed goalkeeper Alex Cisak from Accrington Stanley and Zander Diamond from Aberdeen. Jean-Yves Mvoto, who had been on loan at Oldham during the 2010–11 season was also signed on a permanent contract. Dickov made his highest profile signing of the summer on transfer deadline day, 31 August 2011, when he signed Finnish forward Shefki Kuqi following his release by Newcastle United. Kuqi became an immediate success, scoring 11 goals in his first 15 games for Oldham.

The Latics struggled with inconsistency in the league for the first half of the season, ending 2011 in 14th place in League One. However, propelled by Kuqi's goals and the form of loan signings Luca Scapuzzi and Robbie Simpson, Oldham progressed to the Northern Section Final of the Football League Trophy and the third round of the FA Cup, eventually losing over two legs to Chesterfield in the Football League Trophy and going down 5–1 to Premier League Liverpool in the FA Cup after a creditable display at Anfield.

The end of Oldham's cup runs coincided with a loss of form in the league and the end of Kuqi's goalscoring run. After starting 2012 eight points from the play-offs in 14th place, the Latics slipped into a relegation battle, winning only 5 of their next 20 matches before their League One status was guaranteed by a 1–1 draw at home with Preston North End. The season ended with a 2–1 victory at home to Carlisle, following which Oldham prepared for a summer of change, with a total of 18 first-team players out of contract for the 2012–13 season.

== League table ==
Pos	Team	Pld	W	D	L	GF	GA	GD	Pts
14	Bury	46	15	11	20	60	79	−19	56
15	Preston North End	46	13	15	18	54	68	−14	54
16	Oldham Athletic	46	14	12	20	50	66	−16	54
17	Yeovil Town	46	14	12	20	59	80	−21	54
18	Scunthorpe United	46	10	22	14	55	59	−4	52

Updated to match(es) played on 5 May 2012. Source: BBC Sport
Rules for classification: 1) Points; 2) Goal difference; 3) Number of goals scored

== Squad statistics ==
=== First-team squad ===
Includes all players who were awarded squad numbers during the season.

Note: Flags indicate national team as defined under FIFA eligibility rules; some limited exceptions apply. Players may hold more than one non-FIFA nationality.

No.	Pos.	Nation	Player
1	GK	POL	Alex Cisak
2	DF	FRA	Jean-Yves Mvoto
3	DF	ENG	Paul Black
4	MF	AUS	James Wesolowski (from August 2011)
5	DF	SCO	Zander Diamond (to May 2012)
6	DF	ENG	Nathan Clarke (from August 2011 to January 2012)
6	DF	ENG	Reece Brown (from March 2012)
7	MF	POR	Filipe Morais
8	MF	RSA	Dean Furman (Captain)
9	FW	ENG	Reuben Reid
10	FW	ENG	Robbie Simpson (from September to December 2011 and from January 2012)
11	MF	ENG	Tom Adeyemi (from August 2011 to April 2012)
12	DF	FRA	Bradley Diallo (from August 2011)
13	GK	AUS	Dean Bouzanis (from November 2011)
14	FW	ENG	Matt Smith
15	FW	ENG	Ryan Brooke
16	DF	ENG	James Tarkowski
17	MF	ANT	Josh Parker
18	MF	ENG	Chris Taylor
19	DF	ENG	Kieran Lee

No.	Pos.	Nation	Player
20	MF	NIR	Matthew Lund (to October 2011)
20	FW	ITA	Luca Scapuzzi (from November 2011 to January 2012)
20	MF	COM	Youssouf M'Changama (from March 2012)
21	MF	NIR	Kirk Millar
22	MF	COD	Djeny Bembo-Leta
23	MF	NIR	Phillip McGrath
24	MF	ENG	Connor Hughes
25	DF	ENG	Matthew D Carr
26	DF	NIR	Carl Winchester
27	MF	NIR	Ryan Burns
28	GK	ENG	Paul Gerrard (Player/Coach)
29	MF	ENG	David Mellor
30	MF	ITA	Andreas Mancini (from November 2011 to January 2012)
30	MF	ENG	Keanu Marsh-Brown (from January 2012)
32	FW	FIN	Shefki Kuqi (from August 2011)
33	GK	ENG	Luke Simpson
36	FW	FRA	Oumare Tounkara (from March 2012)
39	FW	ENG	Harry Bunn (from March 2012)
41	DF	ENG	Glenn Belezika
42	DF	ENG	Alex Parks

=== Appearances, goals & disciplinary record ===
As of 6 May 2012

No	Nat	Pos	Name	Total				League				FA Cup				League Cup				JP Trophy			
No	Nat	Pos	Name	Apps	Goal	Yellow card	Red card	Apps	Goal	Yellow card	Red card	Apps	Goal	Yellow card	Red card	Apps	Goal	Yellow card	Red card	Apps	Goal	Yellow card	Red card
1	(Poland)	GK	Alex Cisak	47 (0)	0	1	1	38 (0)	0	1	1	4 (0)	0	0	0	1 (0)	0	0	0	4 (0)	0	0	0
2	(France)	DF	Jean-Yves Mvoto	43 (1)	1	3	2	35 (1)	1	2	2	3 (0)	0	0	0	1 (0)	0	0	0	4 (0)	0	1	0
3	(England)	DF	Paul Black	18 (1)	0	2	0	13 (0)	0	2	0	2 (1)	0	0	0	1 (0)	0	0	0	2 (0)	0	0	0
4	(Australia)	MF	James Wesolowski	31 (0)	4	6	0	21 (0)	3	3	0	4 (0)	1	1	0	1 (0)	0	0	0	5 (0)	0	2	0
6	(England)	DF	Reece Brown	15 (0)	0	3	0	15 (0)	0	3	0	0 (0)	0	0	0	0 (0)	0	0	0	0 (0)	0	0	0
7	(Portugal)	MF	Filipe Morais	26 (19)	5	5	0	23 (13)	5	4	0	0 (4)	0	1	0	1 (0)	0	0	0	2 (2)	0	0	0
8	(South Africa)	MF	Dean Furman	27 (2)	2	6	0	21 (2)	1	4	0	4 (0)	1	1	0	1 (0)	0	1	0	1 (0)	0	0	0
9	(England)	FW	Reuben Reid	19 (3)	6	2	0	17 (3)	5	2	0	0 (0)	0	0	0	1 (0)	1	0	0	1 (0)	0	0	0
10	(England)	FW	Robbie Simpson	33 (3)	9	6	0	26 (3)	6	5	0	3 (0)	2	0	0	0 (0)	0	0	0	4 (0)	1	1	0
12	(France)	DF	Bradley Diallo	13 (3)	0	3	1	12 (3)	0	3	1	0 (0)	0	0	0	0 (0)	0	0	0	1 (0)	0	0	0
13	(Australia)	GK	Dean Bouzanis	8 (1)	0	0	0	8 (1)	0	0	0	0 (0)	0	0	0	0 (0)	0	0	0	0 (0)	0	0	0
14	(England)	FW	Matt Smith	4 (31)	3	1	0	3 (25)	3	1	0	0 (2)	0	0	0	1 (0)	0	0	0	0 (4)	0	0	0
16	(England)	DF	James Tarkowski	14 (4)	1	0	1	13 (3)	1	0	1	0 (0)	0	0	0	0 (0)	0	0	0	1 (1)	0	0	0
17	(Antigua and Barbuda)	FW	Josh Parker	9 (9)	0	1	0	7 (6)	0	1	0	0 (2)	0	0	0	0 (1)	0	0	0	2 (0)	0	0	0
18	(England)	MF	Chris Taylor	46 (0)	3	6	0	38 (0)	2	4	0	3 (0)	1	1	0	1 (0)	0	1	0	4 (0)	0	0	0
19	(England)	DF	Kieran Lee	53 (0)	2	5	0	43 (0)	2	4	0	4 (0)	0	0	0	1 (0)	0	0	0	5 (0)	0	1	0
20	(Comoros)	MF	Youssouf M'Changama	8 (2)	0	0	0	8 (2)	0	0	0	0 (0)	0	0	0	0 (0)	0	0	0	0 (0)	0	0	0
21	(Northern Ireland)	MF	Kirk Millar	2 (3)	0	0	0	2 (2)	0	0	0	0 (0)	0	0	0	0 (0)	0	0	0	0 (1)	0	0	0
24	(England)	MF	Connor Hughes	0 (4)	0	0	0	0 (4)	0	0	0	0 (0)	0	0	0	0 (0)	0	0	0	0 (0)	0	0	0
26	(Northern Ireland)	DF	Carl Winchester	9 (4)	0	0	0	9 (3)	0	0	0	0 (0)	0	0	0	0 (1)	0	0	0	0 (0)	0	0	0
28	(England)	GK	Paul Gerrard	1 (1)	0	0	0	0 (1)	0	0	0	0 (0)	0	0	0	0 (0)	0	0	0	1 (0)	0	0	0
29	(England)	DF	David Mellor	20 (4)	1	2	0	19 (2)	1	0	0	1 (0)	0	1	0	0 (1)	0	0	0	0 (1)	0	1	0
30	(England)	MF	Keanu Marsh-Brown	5 (7)	1	1	1	5 (6)	1	1	1	0 (0)	0	0	0	0 (0)	0	0	0	0 (1)	0	0	0
32	(Finland)	FW	Shefki Kuqi	48 (1)	16	8	0	39 (1)	11	7	0	4 (0)	1	1	0	0 (0)	0	0	0	5 (0)	4	0	0
36	(France)	FW	Oumare Tounkara	3 (5)	1	1	0	3 (5)	1	1	0	0 (0)	0	0	0	0 (0)	0	0	0	0 (0)	0	0	0
39	(England)	FW	Harry Bunn	8 (3)	0	0	0	8 (3)	0	0	0	0 (0)	0	0	0	0 (0)	0	0	0	0 (0)	0	0	0
41	(England)	DF	Glenn Belezika	0 (1)	0	0	0	0 (1)	0	0	0	0 (0)	0	0	0	0 (0)	0	0	0	0 (0)	0	0	0
Players appeared for Oldham this season on loan who have returned to their parent club:
6	(England)	DF	Nathan Clarke	19 (1)	1	5	0	16 (0)	1	4	0	1 (1)	0	0	0	0 (0)	0	0	0	2 (0)	0	1	0
11	(England)	MF	Tom Adeyemi	41 (4)	3	4	0	33 (3)	2	3	0	3 (1)	0	1	0	0 (0)	0	0	0	5 (0)	1	0	0
20	(Northern Ireland)	MF	Matthew Lund	2 (1)	0	1	0	2 (1)	0	1	0	0 (0)	0	0	0	0 (0)	0	0	0	0 (0)	0	0	0
20	(Italy)	FW	Luca Scapuzzi	15 (2)	2	1	0	8 (2)	1	1	0	4 (0)	0	0	0	0 (0)	0	0	0	3 (0)	1	0	0
30	(Italy)	MF	Andreas Mancini	0 (2)	0	0	0	0 (1)	0	0	0	0 (0)	0	0	0	0 (0)	0	0	0	0 (1)	0	0	0
Players released or transferred out during the season:
5	(Scotland)	DF	Zander Diamond	29 (2)	2	2	0	21 (2)	2	2	0	4 (0)	0	0	0	1 (0)	0	0	0	3 (0)	0	0	0
			TOTALS		64	75	6		50	59	6		6	7	0		1	2	0		7	7	0

=== Top scorers ===
Place	Position	Nation	Name	League One	FA Cup	League Cup	JP Trophy	Total
1	FW	(Finland)	Shefki Kuqi	11	1	0	4	16
2	FW	(England)	Robbie Simpson	6	2	0	1	9
3	FW	(England)	Reuben Reid	5	0	1	0	6
4	MF	(Portugal)	Filipe Morais	5	0	0	0	5
5	MF	(Australia)	James Wesolowski	3	1	0	0	4
6	MF	(England)	Tom Adeyemi	2	0	0	1	3
=	FW	(England)	Matt Smith	3	0	0	0	3
=	MF	(England)	Chris Taylor	2	1	0	0	3
7	DF	(Scotland)	Zander Diamond	2	0	0	0	2
=	MF	(South Africa)	Dean Furman	1	1	0	0	2
=	DF	(England)	Kieran Lee	2	0	0	0	2
=	MF	(Italy)	Luca Scapuzzi	1	0	0	1	2
8	DF	(England)	Nathan Clarke	1	0	0	0	1
=	MF	(England)	Keanu Marsh-Brown	1	0	0	0	1
=	MF	(England)	David Mellor	1	0	0	0	1
=	DF	(France)	Jean-Yves Mvoto	1	0	0	0	1
=	DF	(England)	James Tarkowski	1	0	0	0	1
=	FW	(France)	Oumare Tounkara	1	0	0	0	1
			TOTALS	50	6	1	7	64

== Transfers ==
Players transferred in
Date	Pos.	Name	Previous club	Fee	Ref.
30 June 2011	DF	(France) Jean-Yves Mvoto	(England) Sunderland	Free	
6 July 2011	GK	(Australia) Alex Cisak	(England) Accrington Stanley	Free	
14 July 2011	DF	(Scotland) Zander Diamond	(Scotland) Aberdeen	Free	
5 August 2011	MF	(Antigua and Barbuda) Josh Parker	(England) Queens Park Rangers	Free	
8 August 2011	MF	(Australia) James Wesolowski	(England) Peterborough United	Free	
19 August 2011	DF	(France) Bradley Diallo	(France) Olympique Marseille	Free	
31 August 2011	FW	(Finland) Shefki Kuqi	Unattached	Free	
26 November 2011	GK	(Australia) Dean Bouzanis	Unattached	Free	
30 January 2012	FW	(England) Robbie Simpson	(England) Huddersfield Town	Free	
30 January 2012	FW	(England) Keanu Marsh-Brown	Unattached	Free	
5 March 2012	MF	(Comoros) Youssouf M'Changama	Unattached	Free	
Players transferred out
Date	Pos.	Name	To	Fee	Ref.
21 June 2011	DF	(Cameroon) Cedric Evina	(England) Charlton Athletic	Free	
23 June 2011	FW	(England) Lewis Alessandra	(England) Morecambe	Free	
29 June 2011	MF	(England) Dale Stephens	(England) Charlton Athletic	Undisclosed	
1 May 2012	DF	(Scotland) Zander Diamond	Released	Free	
Players loaned in
Date from	Pos.	Name	From	Date to	Ref.
28 July 2011	MF	(Northern Ireland) Matthew Lund	(England) Stoke City	October 2011	
19 August 2011	DF	(England) Nathan Clarke	(England) Huddersfield Town	January 2012	
31 August 2011	MF	(England) Tom Adeyemi	(England) Norwich City	9 April 2012	
9 September 2011	FW	(England) Robbie Simpson	(England) Huddersfield Town	9 December 2011	
3 November 2011	FW	(Italy) Luca Scapuzzi	(England) Manchester City	29 January 2012	
3 November 2011	FW	(Italy) Andreas Mancini	(England) Manchester City	3 January 2012	
2 January 2012	FW	(England) Robbie Simpson	(England) Huddersfield Town	2 February 2012	
2 March 2012	DF	(England) Reece Brown	(England) Manchester United	6 May 2012	
16 March 2012	FW	(England) Harry Bunn	(England) Manchester City	6 May 2012	
23 March 2012	FW	(England) Oumare Tounkara	(England) Sunderland	6 May 2012	
Players loaned out
Date from	Pos.	Name	To	Date to	Ref.
10 September 2011	FW	(England) Ryan Brooke	(England) Barrow	9 October 2011	
31 January 2012	FW	(England) Ryan Brooke	(England) AFC Telford United	29 April 2012	
6 March 2012	DF	(England) Matthew D Carr	(England) Woodley Sports	22 April 2012	
8 March 2012	MF	(England) Josh Parker	(England) Dagenham & Redbridge	6 May 2012	
14 March 2012	FW	(England) Matt Smith	(England) Macclesfield Town	6 May 2012	

== Results & fixtures ==
=== Pre-season friendlies ===
9 July 2011	Barrow	2–0	Oldham Athletic	Holker Street
15:00	Pearson; Mellor

23 July 2011	Oldham Athletic	2–1	Blackpool	Boundary Park
15:00	Smith 4'; Mellor 71'		Clarke 80'

26 July 2011	Oldham Athletic	0–0	Burnley	Boundary Park
19:45				Attendance: 2,153

30 July 2011	Fleetwood Town	0–1	Oldham Athletic	Highbury Stadium
15:00			Diamond 34'

=== League One ===
6 August 2011 1	Oldham Athletic	0–2	Sheffield United	Boundary Park
15:00			Maguire 48'; Cresswell 54'	Attendance: 8,032

13 August 2011 2	Yeovil Town	3–1	Oldham Athletic	Huish Park
15:00	Upson 49'; A. Williams 74'; Wotton 82' (pen.)		Reid 90+2' (pen.)	Attendance: 3,237

16 August 2011 3	Scunthorpe United	1–2	Oldham Athletic	Glanford Park
19:45	Dagnall 63'		Mellor 16'; Smith 82'	Attendance: 4,142

20 August 2011 4	Oldham Athletic	2–0	Rochdale	Boundary Park
15:00	Reid 32' (pen.); Clarke 45+3'			Attendance: 5,266

27 August 2011 5	Colchester United	4–1	Oldham Athletic	Colchester Community Stadium
15:00	Wordsworth 1', 45+5' (pen.); Henderson 46'; Heath 56'		Reid 37' (pen.)	Attendance: 3,023

3 September 2011 6	Oldham Athletic	1–1	Huddersfield Town	Boundary Park
15:00	Kuqi 6'		Kay 16'	Attendance: 6,213

10 September 2011 7	Oldham Athletic	1–1	Stevenage	Boundary Park
15:00	Kuqi 19'		Roberts 4'	Attendance: 3,402

13 September 2011 8	Walsall	0–1	Oldham Athletic	Bank's Stadium
19:45			Taylor 29'	Attendance: 3,250

17 September 2011 9	Leyton Orient	1–3	Oldham Athletic	Brisbane Road
15:00	Porter 18'		Kuqi 49'; Reid 65'; Smith 89'	Attendance: 3,699

24 September 2011 10	Oldham Athletic	0–2	Brentford	Boundary Park
15:00			Douglas 38'; Weston 73'	Attendance: 3,777

1 October 2011 11	Exeter City	2–0	Oldham Athletic	St James Park
15:00	Nardiello 18'; Bauza 49'			Attendance: 3,753

10 October 2011 12	Oldham Athletic	2–1	MK Dons	Boundary Park
19:45	Kuqi 43'; Adeyemi 56'		Morrison 85'	Attendance: 2,408

15 October 2011 13	Tranmere Rovers	1–0	Oldham Athletic	Prenton Park
15:00	Baxter 18'			Attendance: 5,117

22 October 2011 14	Oldham Athletic	2–0	Wycombe Wanderers	Boundary Park
15:00	Wesolowski 59'; Dean Furman 80'			Attendance: 3,592

25 October 2011 15	Preston	3–3	Oldham Athletic	Deepdale
19:45	Tsoumou 28'; Proctor 32'; Devine 64'		Kuqi 41'; Wesolowski 44', 86'	Attendance: 11,370

29 October 2011 16	Carlisle United	3–3	Oldham Athletic	Brunton Park
15:00	Miller 45+2'; Zoko 48', 90+4'		Kuqi 22' (pen.), 38'; Adeyemi 33'	Attendance: 4,803

5 November 2011 17	Oldham Athletic	0–2	Bury	Boundary Park
15:00			Bishop 22', 30'	Attendance: 5,149

19 November 2011 18	Oldham Athletic	5–2	Chesterfield	Boundary Park
15:00	Lee 3'; Simpson 12', 17', 33'; Kuqi 58'		Westcarr 30'; Clarke 87'	Attendance: 3,699

26 November 2011 19	Bournemouth	0–0	Oldham Athletic	Dean Court
15:00				Attendance: 5,478

10 December 2011 20	Oldham Athletic	0–2	Sheffield Wednesday	Boundary Park
15:00			Prutton 62'; Lowe 84' (pen.)	Attendance: 7,060

17 December 2011 21	Charlton Athletic	1–1	Oldham Athletic	The Valley
15:00	Russell 60'		Morais 84'	Attendance: 19,564

26 December 2011 22	Oldham Athletic	0–1	Hartlepool United	Boundary Park
15:00			Poole 7'	Attendance: 4,459

31 December 2011 23	Oldham Athletic	3–2	Notts County	Boundary Park
15:00	Scapuzzi 27'; Morais 70'; Diamond 86'		Hughes 10'; Bishop 39'	Attendance: 3,623

2 January 2012 24	Chesterfield	1–1	Oldham Athletic	B2net Stadium
15:00	Bowery 34'		Smith 45+3'	Attendance: 6,723

7 January 2012 Postponed (Clash with F.A. Cup)	Oldham Athletic	P–P	Colchester United	Boundary Park
15:00

14 January 2012 25	Huddersfield Town	1–0	Oldham Athletic	Galpharm Stadium
15:00	Lee 86'			Attendance: 15,229

21 January 2012 26	Oldham Athletic	0–0	Exeter City	Boundary Park
15:00				Attendance: 3,587

28 January 2012 Postponed (Frozen Pitch)	Stevenage	P–P	Oldham Athletic	Broadhall Way
15:00

4 February 2012 Postponed (Frozen Pitch)	Oldham Athletic	P–P	Leyton Orient	Boundary Park
15:00

11 February 2012 Postponed (Frozen Pitch)	Brentford	P–P	Oldham Athletic	Griffin Park
15:00

14 February 2012 27	Oldham Athletic	2–1	Walsall	Boundary Park
19:45	Morais 2'; Simpson		Cuvelier 74'	Attendance: 2,583

18 February 2012 28	MK Dons	5–0	Oldham Athletic	Stadium MK
15:00	Bowditch 9' (pen.); Powell 47', 66'; Doumbe 69'; Gleeson 78'			Attendance: 7,817

25 February 2012 29	Oldham Athletic	1–0	Tranmere Rovers	Boundary Park
15:00	Kuqi 48' (pen.)			Attendance: 3,866

28 February 2012 30	Oldham Athletic	1–1	Colchester United	Boundary Park
19:45	Marsh-Brown 37'		Wordsworth 81'	Attendance: 3,956

3 March 2012 31	Sheffield United	2–3	Oldham Athletic	Brammall Lane
15:00	Lowton 22'; Evans 38'		Cresswell 65' (o.g.); Lee 69'; Kuqi 90' (pen.)	Attendance: 17,267

6 March 2012 32	Oldham Athletic	1–2	Scunthorpe United	Boundary Park
19:45	Morais 78'		Mirfin 73'; Thompson 80'	Attendance: 4,376

10 March 2012 33	Oldham Athletic	1–2	Yeovil Town	Boundary Park
15:00	Diamond 55'		Williams 10'; Williams 65'	Attendance: 4,689

13 March 2012 34	Stevenage	1–0	Oldham Athletic	Broadhall Way
19:45	Wilson 90'			Attendance: 2,453

17 March 2012 35	Rochdale	3–2	Oldham Athletic	Spotland
15:00	Symes 3', 47', 70'		Kuqi 21'; Reid 74'	Attendance: 4,671

20 March 2012 36	Hartlepool United	0–1	Oldham Athletic	Victoria Park
19:45			Mvoto 8'	Attendance: 4,109

24 March 2012 37	Oldham Athletic	1–0	Bournemouth	Boundary Park
15:00	Taylor 52'			Attendance: 4,459

27 March 2012 38	Oldham Athletic	0–1	Leyton Orient	Boundary Park
19:45			Mooney 70'	Attendance: 4,145

31 March 2012 39	Notts County	1–0	Oldham Athletic	Meadow Lane
15:00	Sheehan 89'			Attendance: 6,326

3 April 2012 40	Brentford	2–0	Oldham Athletic	Griffin Park
19:45	Bean 2'; McGinn 67'			Attendance: 4,573

7 April 2012 41	Oldham Athletic	0–1	Charlton Athletic	Boundary Park
15:00			Kermorgant 49'	Attendance: 3,641

9 April 2012 42	Sheffield Wednesday	3–0	Oldham Athletic	Hillsborough
12:45	Madine 43'; Llera 67'; Lowe 80'			Attendance: 22,232

14 April 2012 43	Wycombe Wanderers	2–2	Oldham Athletic	Adams Park
15:00	Beavon 34'; Grant 78'		Morais 14'; Simpson 90' (pen.)	Attendance: 5,109

21 April 2012 44	Oldham Athletic	1–1	Preston North End	Boundary Park
15:00	Simpson 69'		Holroyd 79'	Attendance: 4,824

28 April 2012 45	Bury	0–0	Oldham Athletic	Gigg Lane
15:00				Attendance: 5,111

5 May 2012 46	Oldham Athletic	2–1	Carlisle United	Boundary Park
15:00	Tarkowski 49'; Diallo (yellow card) 64'; Tounkara 72'		Noble (yellow card) 56'; Taiwo 68'	Attendance: 5,152

=== FA Cup ===
12 November 2011 Round 1	Oldham Athletic	3–1	Burton Albion	Boundary Park
15:00	Kuqi 4' (pen.); Simpson 13'; Furman 35'		Zola 71'	Attendance: 3,102

3 December 2011 Round 2	Southend United	1–1	Oldham Athletic	Roots Hall
15:00	Hall 67'		Wesolowski 39'	Attendance: 4,613

13 December 2011 Round 2 (Replay)	Oldham Athletic	1–0	Southend United	Boundary Park
19:45	Taylor 58'			Attendance: 4,207

6 January 2012 Round 3	Liverpool	5–1	Oldham Athletic	Anfield
20:00	Bellamy 30'; Gerrard 45+1' (pen.); Shelvey 68'; Carroll 89'; Downing 90+5'		Simpson 28'	Attendance: 44,556

=== League Cup ===
9 August 2011 Round 1	Oldham Athletic	1–1 (a.e.t.) (2–4 p)	Carlisle United	Boundary Park
19:45	Reid 24' (pen.)		McGovern 57'	Attendance: 1,786
	Penalties
	Furman (penalty scored); Smith (penalty scored); Taylor (penalty missed); Parker (penalty missed)		McGovern (penalty scored); Welsh (penalty scored); Robson (penalty missed); Berrett (penalty scored); Loy (penalty scored)

=== Football League Trophy ===
Round 1 (N)	bye

4 October 2011 Round 2 (N)	Scunthorpe United	0–1	Oldham Athletic	Glanford Park
19:45			Kuqi 26'	Attendance: 2,106

8 November 2011 Quarter Final (N)	Oldham Athletic	3–1	Crewe Alexandra	Boundary Park
19:00	Kuqi 12', 59'; Scapuzzi 72'		Powell 54'	Attendance: 2,163

6 December 2011 Semi Final (N)	Oldham Athletic	2–0	Bradford City	Boundary Park
19:45	Adeyemi 61'; Kuqi 80'			Attendance: 5,697

17 January 2012 Final (N) (L1) (Frozen Pitch)	Chesterfield	P–P	Oldham Athletic	B2net Stadium
19:45

18 January 2012 Final (N) (L1)	Chesterfield	2–1	Oldham Athletic	B2net Stadium
19:45	Boden 49'; Whitaker 67' (pen.)		Simpson 58'	Attendance: 5,724

30 January 2012 Final (N) (L2)	Oldham Athletic	0–1	Chesterfield	Boundary Park
19:45			Lestor 88'	Attendance: 5,622
