= Luca Scapuzzi =

Italian footballer

Personal information
- Date of birth: 15 April 1991 (age 35)
- Place of birth: Milan, Italy
- Height: 1.87 m (6 ft 1 1/2 in)
- Position: Striker

Team information
- Current team: Caratese

Youth career
- 1999–2001: Olmi
- 2001–2009: Milan

Senior career*
Years	Team	Apps	(Gls)
2009–2011	Portogruaro	29	(0)
2011–2014	Manchester City	0	(0)
2011–2012	→ Oldham Athletic (loan)	10	(1)
2012	→ Portsmouth (loan)	2	(0)
2013	→ Varese (loan)	10	(0)
2013–2014	→ Siena (loan)	12	(0)
2014–2016	Como	23	(1)
2016–2022	Pro Sesto	171	(31)
2022–2023	Lecco	12	(1)
2023–	Caratese	1	(0)
- * Club domestic league appearances and goals as of 4 October 2023

Luca Scapuzzi (born 15 April 1991) is an Italian professional footballer who plays as a striker for Serie D club Caratese.

He most notably signed professional terms for Premier League side Manchester City in 2011 under Roberto Mancini, however he only made two appearances in the EFL Cup. During his three-year stay he spent time on loan with Oldham Athletic, Portsmouth, Varese and Siena. He signed for Como in 2014 on a permanent basis and later had a six-year spell with Pro Sesto.

== Club career ==
=== A.C. Milan Primavera and Portogruaro ===
Scapuzzi joined A.C. Milan's youth system from Olmi in 2001. He spent eight years at the A.C. Milan academy before released in June 2009. He joined Portogruaro at the beginning of the 2009–10 season. Scapuzzi made his professional debut with his new club in the first league game of the season, a home loss to Ravenna on 23 August 2009. He went on to make a total of 22 league appearances but remained scoreless as Portogruaro won promotion to Serie B. He made 7 more appearances in the second division before mutually terminating his contract with Portogruaro in July 2011.

=== Manchester City ===
On 30 July 2011 Scapuzzi played for the Manchester City first team in the Dublin Super Cup while on trial with the Elite Development Squad. He scored after coming on as a substitute late in the game against the League of Ireland XI. After a successful trial period with the EDS Scapuzzi signed a 3-year contract with the club.

On 19 September 2011 Scapuzzi made his official debut for the Manchester City first team as a substitute against Birmingham City in the third round of the League Cup. Scapuzzi played again in the next round of the League Cup on 26 October 2011, this time starting the match against Wolverhampton Wanderers, a game in which he made two assists and scored a deflected goal, however the goal was attributed as an own goal to the opposition goalkeeper.

==== Oldham Athletic (loan) ====
It was announced on 3 November 2011 that Scapuzzi and fellow EDS youth player Andrea Mancini would both be joining Oldham Athletic for two and one-month loan spells respectively. Scapuzzi made his debut two days later in the starting eleven that lost 0–2 to local rivals Bury. Unfortunately, he was replaced by substitute goalkeeper Paul Gerrard in only the tenth minute of the game as part of a tactical rearrangement of the 10-man Latics team by manager Paul Dickov after their goalkeeper Alex Cisak was shown an early straight red card for an unfair challenge in the penalty box. Three days later Scapuzzi again started for the home side in the Football League Trophy quarter-final game against Crewe Alexandra, this time managing to get on the score sheet before being substituted in the 74th minute. Scapuzzi returned to playing Premier League opponents, as he started against Liverpool in the FA Cup third round, taking the first shot in the game. On the day of the match, it was reported that Scapuzzi had signed a contract extension until the end of January. Scapuzzi ended his loan spell at Oldham Athletic with a substitute appearance in the 57th minute, in a 0–0 draw. He returned to Manchester City the following day.

==== Portsmouth (loan) ====
On 22 March 2012, it was confirmed that Scapuzzi and Rekik will join Portsmouth in a month's loan. He made his début two days later coming on as a substitute in a 2–0 defeat to Coventry City. After just two league appearances, Scapuzzi returned to Manchester City following a disappointing loan spell after finding his playing chances limited.

==== Varese, Siena (loan) ====
Scapuzzi signed for Italian Serie B side Varese on loan on 8 January 2013 until the end of the season. He made his debut as a 77th-minute sub against Brescia on 22 January 2013. In August 2013 he has signed for Italian Serie B side Siena on loan. He will wear the No. 14 shirt at Siena next season.

=== Calcio Como ===
Scapuzzi signed for Como on 9 September 2014, going on to make 15 appearances over two years.

=== Pro Sesto ===
On 11 November 2016 Scapuzzi signed for Italian Serie D side Pro Sesto on a one-year contract until June 2017.

== Career statistics ==
=== Club ===
As of match played 17 October 2021.

Appearances and goals by club, season and competition
Club	Season	League			National Cup		League Cup		Other		Total	
Club	Season	Division	Apps	Goals	Apps	Goals	Apps	Goals	Apps	Goals	Apps	Goals
Portogruaro	2009–10	Lega Pro 1	22	0	0	0	—		—		22	0
Portogruaro	2010–11	Serie B	7	0	0	0	—		—		7	0
Portogruaro	Total		29	0	0	0	0	0	0	0	29	0
Manchester City	2011–12	Premier League	0	0	0	0	2	0	—		2	0
Oldham Athletic (loan)	2011–12	League One	10	1	4	0	—		3 (Note: Appearance(s) in EFL Trophy)	1	17	2
Portsmouth (loan)	2011–12	Championship	2	0	0	0	—		—		2	0
Varese (loan)	2012–13	Serie B	10	0	0	0	—		—		10	0
Siena (loan)	2013–14	Serie B	12	0	2	0	—		—		14	0
Como	2014–15	Lega Pro 1	15	1	0	0	5	2	—		20	3
Como	2015–16	Serie B	8	0	1	0	—		—		9	0
Como	Total		23	1	1	0	5	2	0	0	29	3
Pro Sesto	2016–17	Serie D	12	2	0	0	—		—		12	2
Pro Sesto	2017–18	Serie D	31	12	0	0	1	0	1 (Note: Appearance(s) in Promotion Playoffs)	0	33	12
Pro Sesto	2018–19	Serie D	32	6	0	0	1	0	2	2	35	8
Pro Sesto	2019–20	Serie D	25	6	0	0	1	1	—		26	7
Pro Sesto	2020–21	Serie C	33	1	0	0	—		—		33	1
Pro Sesto	2021–22	Serie C	9	0	0	0	1	0	—		10	0
Pro Sesto	Total		142	27	0	0	4	1	3	2	149	30
Career total			228	29	7	0	11	3	6	3	252	35
