= Jean-Yves Mvoto =

French professional footballer (born 1988)

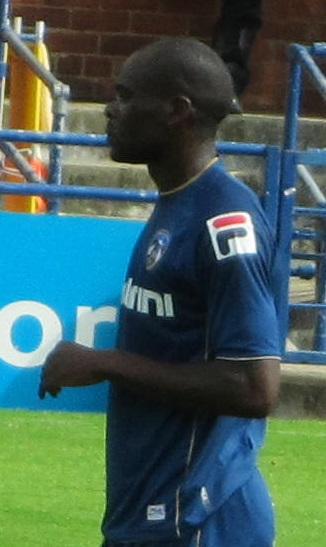
- Mvoto playing for Oldham Athletic in 2012

Personal information
- Full name: Jean-Yves Mvoto Owono
- Date of birth: 6 September 1988 (age 38)
- Place of birth: Paris, France
- Height: 1.94 m (6 ft 4 in)
- Position: Defender

Youth career
- 1999–2003: USM Carrières sur Seine
- 2003–2005: Paris Saint-Germain

Senior career*
Years	Team	Apps	(Gls)
2005–2008	Paris Saint-Germain	0	(0)
2008–2011	Sunderland	0	(0)
2009–2010	→ Southend United (loan)	17	(1)
2010–2011	→ Oldham Athletic (loan)	27	(2)
2011–2013	Oldham Athletic	78	(5)
2013–2015	Barnsley	43	(2)
2015–2016	Leyton Orient	8	(0)
2016	Zawisza Bydgoszcz	6	(0)
2016–2017	Raith Rovers	34	(2)
2017–2018	Dunfermline Athletic	13	(0)
2019	Nybergsund	16	(2)
2020–2024	Wormatia Worms	51	(7)
Total		293	(21)
- * Club domestic league appearances and goals

Jean-Yves Mvoto Owono (born 6 September 1988) is a French former professional footballer who played as a defender. He has played for English teams Oldham Athletic, Barnsley, Leyton Orient, Polish team Zawisza Bydgoszcz, Scottish sides Raith Rovers and Dunfermline Athletic, Norwegian outfit Nybergsund, before retiring after a four-year stint with German club Wormatia Worms.

== Club career ==
Mvoto was born in Paris. He joined Sunderland on a 3 1/2-year contract for an undisclosed fee on 15 January 2008. On 7 August 2009, Mvoto signed a six-month loan with Southend United.

On 12 January 2010, Mvoto extended his loan with Southend until the end of the season. He scored his first goal for Southend in a 2–2 draw with future club Oldham Athletic on 24 April 2010.

On 5 August 2010 he, along with teammate Oumare Tounkara, joined Oldham Athletic on a season-long loan. He scored his first Oldham goal on 30 October 2010 in a 4–2 victory over Plymouth Argyle. After being virtually ever present for the team he injured his ankle and Oldham cancelled the remainder of his loan in January 2011. However, on 18 March 2011, after regaining full fitness, Oldham Athletic re-signed the defender on loan from Sunderland until the end of the season. On 7 April, Sunderland announced that he was amongst eight players to be released at the end of the season.

On 30 June 2011, Oldham Athletic announced that Mvoto had signed a two-year contract with the club, despite interest from other clubs.

Mvoto signed a two-year contract with Championship club Barnsley on 23 July 2013.

After leaving Barnsley in the summer of 2015, he spent some time without a club before signing on a two-month contract with League Two club Leyton Orient on 20 November 2015. On 20 January 2016, Leyton Orient announced that Mvoto would be departing the club at the conclusion of his two-month deal.

In January 2016, he signed at Polish club Zawisza Bydgoszcz.

On 8 July 2016, it was announced that Mvoto had signed for Raith Rovers. After one year with Raith, Mvoto signed a one-year deal for Fife rivals Dunfermline Athletic in May 2017. Mvoto left East End Park at the end of his contract.

Mvoto joined Norwegian Third Division side Nybergsund in April 2019.

== International career ==
Mvoto is a former France Under-19 international.

== Career statistics ==
As of 5 May 2018

Appearances and goals by club, season and competition
Club	Season	League			National cup		League cup		Other		Total	
Club	Season	Division	Apps	Goals	Apps	Goals	Apps	Goals	Apps	Goals	Apps	Goals
Sunderland	2009–10	Premier League	0	0	0	0	0	0	—		0	0
Sunderland	2010–11	Premier League	0	0	0	0	0	0	—		0	0
Sunderland	Total		0	0	0	0	0	0	0	0	0	0
Southend United (loan)	2009–10	League One	17	1	0	0	2	0	0	0	19	1
Oldham Athletic (loan)	2010–11	League One	27	2	1	0	1	0	1 (Note: Appearances in Football League Trophy)	0	30	2
Oldham Athletic	2011–12	League One	36	1	3	0	1	0	4	0	44	1
Oldham Athletic	2012–13	League One	42	4	5	0	1	1	1	0	49	5
Oldham Athletic	Total		105	7	9	0	3	1	6	0	123	8
Barnsley	2013–14	Championship	28	2	1	0	1	0	—		30	2
Barnsley	2014–15	League One	15	0	0	0	1	0	0	0	16	0
Barnsley	Total		43	2	1	0	2	0	0	0	46	0
Leyton Orient	2015–16	League Two	8	0	2	0	0	0	0	0	10	0
Zawisza Bydgoszcz	2015–16	I liga	6	0	1	0	—		—		7	0
Raith Rovers	2016–17	Scottish Championship	34	2	2	0	2	0	3 (Note: One appearance in the Scottish Challenge Cup and two in the Championship play-offs)	0	41	2
Dunfermline Athletic	2017–18	Scottish Championship	13	0	1	0	4	0	3 (Note: Appearances in the Scottish Challenge Cup)	0	21	0
Career totals			226	12	16	0	13	1	12	0	267	13
