= Andy Crompton =

English footballer

Personal information
- Full name: Andrew Crompton
- Place of birth: Stretford, England
- Position: Forward

Youth career
- ?–2008: Fletcher Moss Rangers
- 2008–2011: Oldham Athletic

Senior career*
Years	Team	Apps	(Gls)
2010–2011	Oldham Athletic	0	(0)
- * Club domestic league appearances and goals as of 12 August 2010

Andrew Crompton is an English footballer who is a free agent, having last played for Oldham Athletic.

== Career ==
=== Early years ===
Crompton spent six months as a youth player with Manchester United, but he never earned an academy contract. Before joining Oldham Athletic, he played for Fletcher Moss Rangers, the Greater Manchester side that spawned Manchester United defender Wes Brown.

=== Oldham Athletic ===
Crompton joined Oldham Athletic from Fletcher Moss as a junior in 2008. He made his senior debut for the club on 10 August 2010, coming on for Lewis Alessandra with Oldham 2–1 down in the 85th minute of their League Cup first round match against Scunthorpe United. He had a late opportunity to equalise for the Latics, but he was unable to prevent the defeat. On 31 March 2011 it was announced by the club that they were not going to offer Crompton a professional contract and that he would be released at the end of the season, mainly because of attitude and behaviour issues. He made one appearance for the first team, scoring no goals. In April it was announced he had left the club.

He had a trial in July 2011 with Plymouth Argyle but was not offered a contract.

== Career statistics ==
Club	Season	League		Cup		League Cup		Europe		Other		Total	
Club	Season	Apps	Goals	Apps	Goals	Apps	Goals	Apps	Goals	Apps	Goals	Apps	Goals
Oldham Athletic	2010–11	0	0	0	0	1	0	0	0	0	0	1	0
Career total		0	0	0	0	1	0	0	0	0	0	1	0

Up to date, as of 12 August 2010.
