= Oumare Tounkara =

French association football player (born 1990)

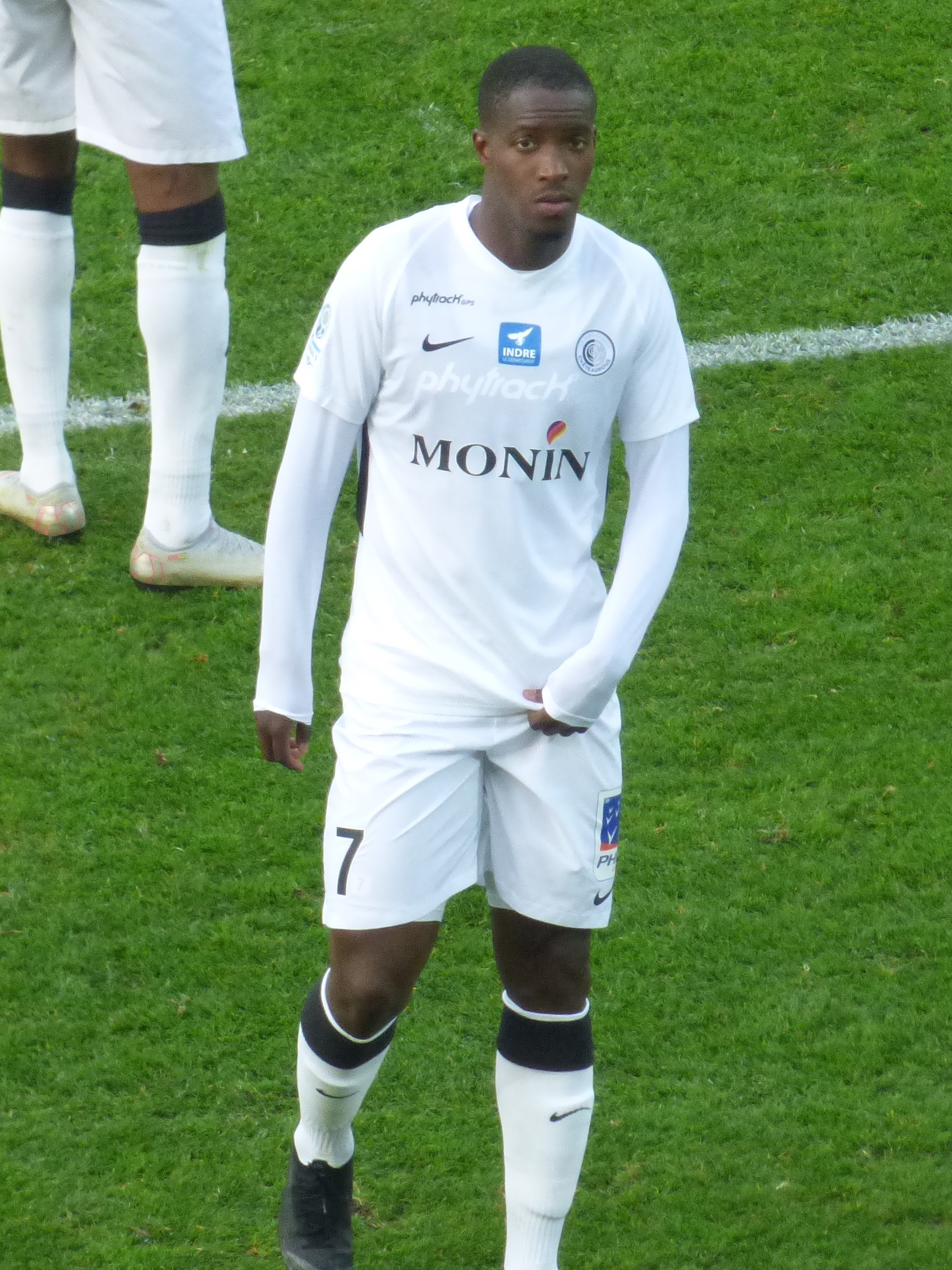
- Tounkara playing for Châteauroux in 2018

Personal information
- Full name: Oumare Tounkara
- Date of birth: 25 May 1990 (age 36)
- Place of birth: Paris, France
- Height: 6 ft 2 in (1.89 m)
- Positions: Winger; centre forward

Senior career*
Years	Team	Apps	(Gls)
2008–2009	Sedan	0	(0)
2009–2012	Sunderland	0	(0)
2010–2011	→ Oldham Athletic (loan)	44	(7)
2012	→ Oldham Athletic (loan)	8	(1)
2012	Red Star	0	(0)
2013	Bristol Rovers	9	(2)
2013–2014	Stevenage	15	(0)
2014	→ Grimsby Town (loan)	12	(2)
2014–2015	Drancy	19	(11)
2015–2019	Châteauroux	122	(28)
2019–2020	Astra Giurgiu	14	(0)
2020–2021	Lyon La Duchère	24	(4)
2021	Fleury	10	(0)
Total		277	(55)
- * Club domestic league appearances and goals as of 00:25, 2 December 2021 (UTC)

Oumare Tounkara (born 25 May 1990) is a French former professional footballer who played as a winger and centre forward.

Tounkara began his career at French club Sedan before signing for Sunderland in the summer of 2009. He spent time on loan at League One club Oldham Athletic, playing regularly during the 2010–11 season and making eight appearances during a brief second loan in the latter stages of the 2011–12 season. He was released by Sunderland in May 2012 without making a senior appearance and briefly returned to France with Red Star of the Championnat National, where he did not feature competitively.

In March 2013, Tounkara joined League Two club Bristol Rovers on a short-term deal, leaving at the end of the season. He subsequently signed for League One club Stevenage, with a loan spell at Grimsby Town. Returning to France in 2014, he joined JA Drancy and scored 11 goals in 19 appearances, earning a move to Châteauroux, where he helped the club gain promotion to Ligue 2 in the 2016–17 season. After 31 goals in 136 appearances across four years at Châteauroux, Tounkara played for Astra Giurgiu in Romania in 2019–20, before returning to France with Lyon La Duchère and Fleury, the latter marking the final role of his playing career before retiring in 2021.

== Early life ==
Tounkara was born in Paris into a Senegalese-Malian family and is one of six siblings.

== Club career ==
=== Sunderland ===
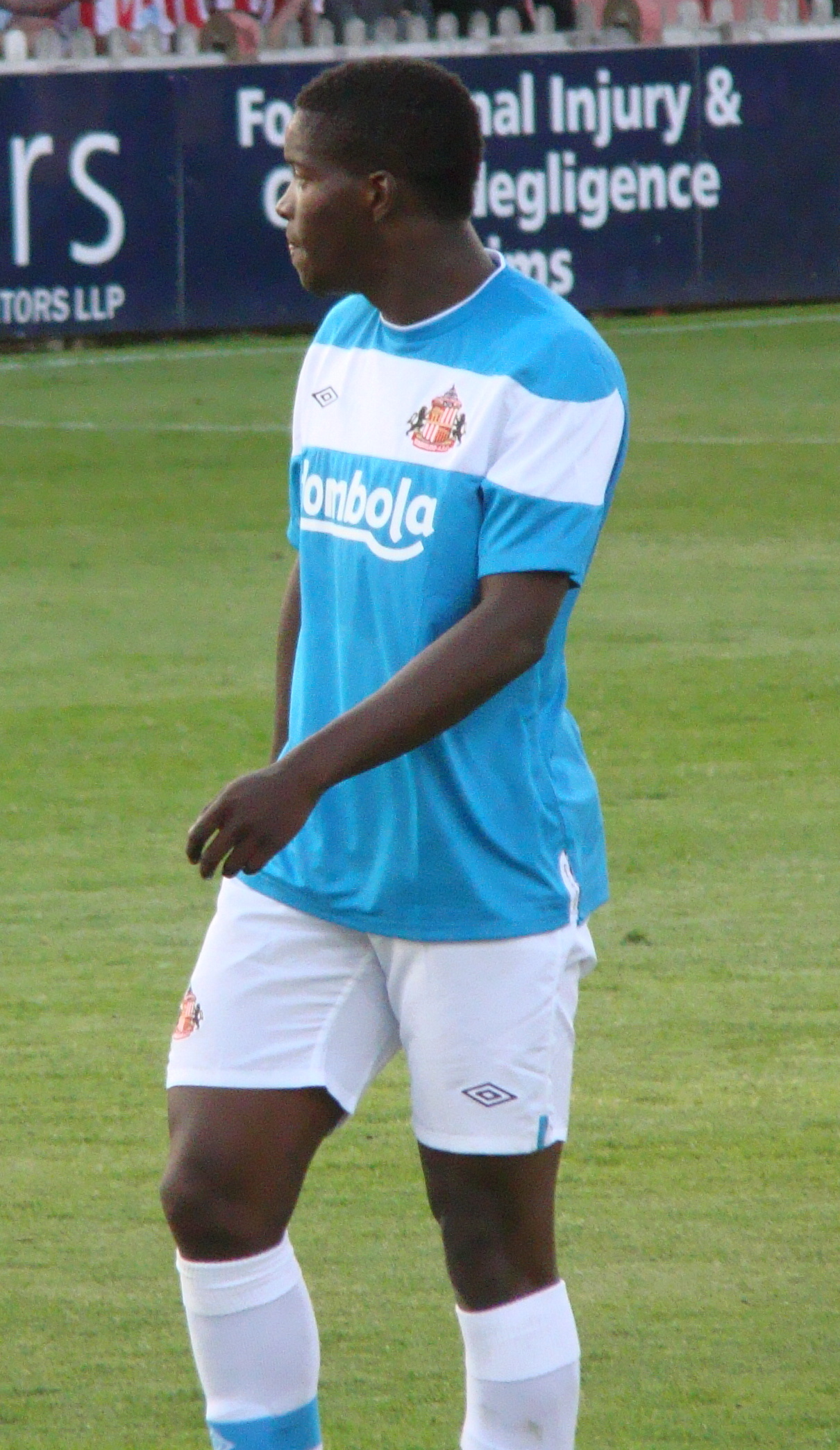
Tounkara playing for Sunderland in 2011

Tounkara signed a professional contract with French Ligue 2 club Sedan ahead of the 2008–09 season, although he did not make a senior appearance during his 12 months at the club. He was subsequently invited for a trial at Premier League club Sunderland and joined permanently in July 2009, having featured in several of the reserve team's pre-season fixtures. He struggled with persistent injuries during his first season, making 13 appearances for the reserves.

Ahead of the 2010–11 season, Tounkara joined League One club Oldham Athletic on a season-long loan deal, along with team-mate Jean-Yves Mvoto, to gain senior experience. He made his debut for Oldham on 7 August 2010, playing 84 minutes in a 2–1 victory over Tranmere Rovers. A week later, he scored his first goal for the club, doubling Oldham's lead in a 3–0 home win against Notts County. Tounkara scored three goals in five matches during late October and November 2010, all at Boundary Park. He was a regular throughout his year at Oldham, making 46 appearances and scoring seven goals.

Tounkara returned to Sunderland at the end of the season and trained with the first team during pre-season ahead of the 2011–12 season, scoring in a 2–1 friendly victory over York City on 13 July 2011. He was assigned a squad number for the season after impressing manager Steve Bruce in pre-season. Although early indications suggested he might feature for the senior team, he resumed playing for Sunderland's reserve team during the first half of the season. He later described the experience as valuable but expressed disappointment at not being given a first-team opportunity. In March 2012, Tounkara rejoined Oldham on loan for the remainder of the 2011–12 season. He made eight appearances, of which three were starts, and scored once, on the last day of the season in a 2–1 victory over Carlisle United. Tounkara was released in May 2012 as one of nine departing players, having made no senior appearances during his three-year spell at the club.

=== Bristol Rovers ===
Following his release from Sunderland, Tounkara briefly returned to France to play for Red Star of the Championnat National, although he did not make any first-team appearances during his time at the club. In February 2013, Tounkara joined League Two club Bristol Rovers on a week-long trial. The trial proved to be successful, and he signed a short-term contract until the end of the 2012–13 season. He made his debut for Bristol Rovers in the club's 3–0 win over Burton Albion on 2 March 2013, coming on as a substitute for Ryan Brunt on the hour mark. He scored twice on his first start for the club, on Easter Monday, in a 4–2 away victory against Dagenham & Redbridge. Manager John Ward praised his performance, describing him as "an interesting player" with good awareness and finishing ability. However, he was released at the end of the season, with Ward citing limited playing opportunities due to the return to fitness of other strikers. Tounkara made nine appearances for Bristol Rovers, scoring twice.

=== Stevenage ===
Tounkara signed for League One club Stevenage on a free transfer on 21 May 2013. He made his debut on the opening day of the 2013–14 season, playing the full match in a 4–3 defeat to former club Oldham Athletic. Tounkara played a peripheral role during the first half of the season, making seven starts and 10 substitute appearances, before being made available for loan in January 2014.

Tounkara joined Conference Premier club Grimsby Town on 27 January 2014, on a loan deal for the remainder of the season. He made his debut the following day, coming on as an 83rd-minute substitute in Grimsby's 2–1 away victory at Cambridge United. Tounkara scored his first goal for the club on his first start, scoring in a 4–1 FA Trophy win over Tamworth on 1 February 2014. He added two further goals in April 2014, both at Blundell Park: first, a late equaliser as a substitute against Woking, and then in a 2–1 win over Chester. He made 15 appearances in all competitions during his loan spell, including six starts, and scored three goals.

=== Drancy ===
Tounkara was released by Stevenage in May 2014 and began the 2014–15 season without a club. He joined JA Drancy of the Championnat National 2, the fourth tier of the French football, in October 2014. He made his debut for Drancy on 19 October 2014, playing 83 minutes in the club's 2–0 away victory at Metz II. His arrival coincided with an upturn in form for the club, scoring five goals in his five opening games to help lift Drancy out of the relegation places into mid-table. His early season form at Drancy attracted the interest of Ligue 1 clubs Saint-Étienne and Toulouse, although no move materialised and he remained at Drancy to see out the 2014–15 season. Tounkara scored his first career hat-trick in a 3–1 win over Raon-l'Étape in March 2015, and ended the season having scored 11 goals in 19 appearances for the Parisien team, with Drancy finishing ninth in the league.

=== Châteauroux ===
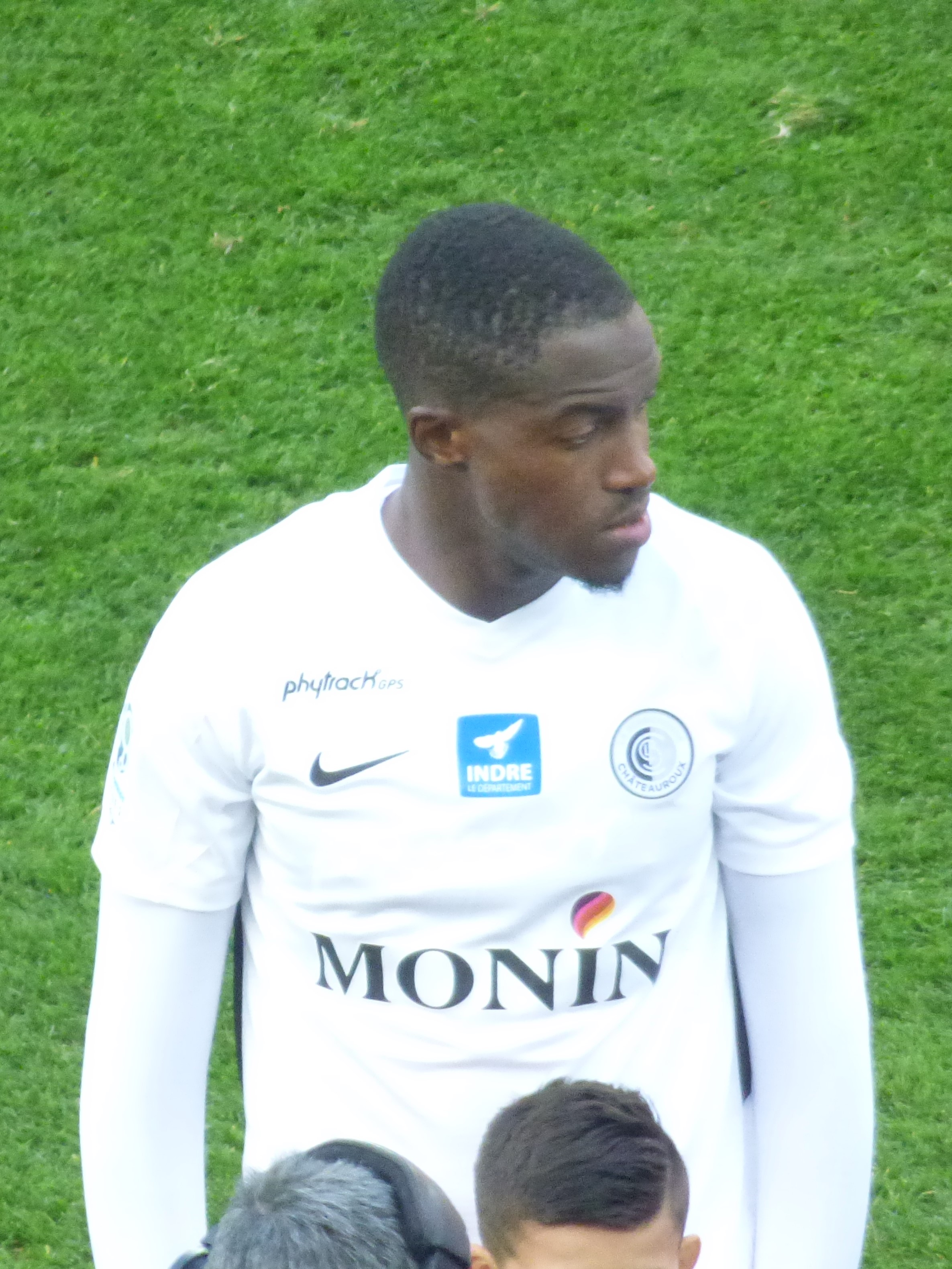
Tounkara playing for Châteauroux in 2018

Tounkara left Drancy at the end of the season and signed for Championnat National club LB Châteauroux on a free transfer ahead of the 2015–16 season. He made his debut in the club's opening game of the season, on 7 August 2015, playing the full 90 minutes in a 1–0 defeat to Fréjus Saint-Raphaël. Tounkara scored his first goals for Châteauroux on 4 September 2015, netting twice late on in a 3–1 victory against US Boulogne at Stade de la Libération. He was a regular for the club throughout the season and adapted well to the step up to the third tier of French football, making 29 appearances in all competitions and scoring 12 times as Châteauroux missed out on promotion with a fifth-placed finish.

Tounkara remained at Châteauroux for the 2016–17 season, which proved successful individually and collectively. He opened the season by scoring in Châteauroux's first league fixture, a 2–0 away win at Les Herbiers VF. Tounkara was a mainstay in the starting line-up for most of the season, starting 30 of the 34 league matches, and made two further substitute appearances, scoring seven goals as Châteauroux won Championnat National and secured promotion to Ligue 2. At the end of the season, it was initially reported that Tounkara had departed following the expiry of his contract, amid interest from "many clubs". However, in June 2017, Châteauroux stated that Tounkara had signed a new three-year contract, extending his stay until 2020.

Tounkara started Châteauroux's opening match of the 2017–18 season, an away fixture against Stade Brest on 28 July 2017, although his Ligue 2 debut was curtailed after he sustained an injury in the ninth minute and was substituted. He returned to first-team action a month later, appearing as a late substitute in a 5–1 win at Sochaux, before scoring his first goal of the season in the club's next match, doubling Châteauroux's lead in an eventual 3–2 home win over US Quevilly on 8 September 2017. Tounkara scored six goals in 34 appearances during the season, as Châteauroux finished ninth, consolidating their place in the second tier. He made 32 appearances in all competitions during the 2018–19 season, scoring four goals.

=== Astra Giurgiu ===
He spent the 2019–20 season with Romanian club Astra Giurgiu, having signed on 26 July 2019. He made his debut in the club's 2–1 victory over FCSB on 5 August 2019, coming on as a 91st-minute substitute. Limited to six starts, he made 15 appearances in all competitions during his time at the club.

=== Return to France ===
Tounkara returned to France and signed for Championnat National club SC Lyon on 1 June 2020, scoring four times in 24 appearances during the 2020–21 season as the club were relegated to Championnat National 2. Tounkara signed for Championnat National 2 club Fleury on 5 August 2021. He debuted for the club in a 2–1 away victory at Beauvais on 14 August 2021, coming on as a 78th-minute substitute in the match.

== International career ==
Tounkara was named in the provisional squad for France's under-20 team for the 2011 Toulon Tournament, but was not selected in the final 20-man selection.

== Style of play ==
Predominantly deployed as a centre forward, Tounkara was also utilised as a left-sided winger during his time at Châteauroux. Upon rejoining Oldham Athletic, manager Paul Dickov identified his physicality and pace as key attributes.

== Career statistics ==
Appearances and goals by club, season and competition
Club	Season	League			National cup (Note: Includes Coupe de France, Cupa României, FA Cup)		League cup (Note: Includes Coupe de la Ligue, Football League Cup)		Other		Total	
Club	Season	Division	Apps	Goals	Apps	Goals	Apps	Goals	Apps	Goals	Apps	Goals
Sedan	2008–09	Ligue 2	0	0	0	0	0	0	0	0	0	0
Sunderland	2009–10	Premier League	0	0	0	0	0	0	0	0	0	0
Sunderland	2010–11	Premier League	0	0	0	0	0	0	0	0	0	0
Sunderland	2011–12	Premier League	0	0	0	0	0	0	0	0	0	0
Sunderland	Total		0	0	0	0	0	0	0	0	0	0
Oldham Athletic (loan)	2010–11	League One	44	7	1	0	0	0	1 (Note: Appearance in the EFL Trophy)	0	46	7
Oldham Athletic (loan)	2011–12	League One	8	1	0	0	0	0	0	0	8	1
Oldham Athletic (loan)	Total		52	8	1	0	0	0	1	0	54	8
Red Star	2012–13	Championnat National	0	0	0	0	0	0	0	0	0	0
Bristol Rovers	2012–13	League Two	9	2	0	0	0	0	0	0	9	2
Stevenage	2013–14	League One	15	0	0	0	2	0	0	0	17	0
Grimsby Town (loan)	2013–14	Conference Premier	12	2	0	0	—		3 (Note: Appearances in the FA Trophy)	1	15	3
Drancy	2014–15	Championnat National 2	19	11	0	0	—		0	0	19	11
Châteauroux	2015–16	Championnat National	28	12	0	0	1	0	0	0	29	12
Châteauroux	2016–17	Championnat National	32	7	3	2	2	0	0	0	37	10
Châteauroux	2017–18	Ligue 2	32	5	3	1	0	0	0	0	35	6
Châteauroux	2018–19	Ligue 2	29	4	1	0	2	0	0	0	32	4
Châteauroux	Total		122	28	7	3	7	0	0	0	136	31
Astra Giurgiu	2019–20	Liga I	14	0	1	0	0	0	0	0	15	0
Sporting Club Lyon	2020–21	Championnat National	24	4	0	0	—		0	0	24	4
Fleury	2021–22	Championnat National 2	10	0	0	0	—		0	0	10	0
Career total			277	55	9	3	7	0	4	1	297	59

== Honours ==
Châteauroux

- Championnat National: 2016–17
