= Connor Hughes (footballer) =

English footballer (born 1993)

Personal information
- Full name: Connor Niall Hughes
- Date of birth: 6 May 1993 (age 33)
- Place of birth: Bolton, England
- Height: 5 ft 11 in (1.80 m)
- Positions: Forward; winger

Team information
- Current team: Nelson

Youth career
- 2009–2011: Oldham Athletic

Senior career*
Years	Team	Apps	(Gls)
2011–2013	Oldham Athletic	8	(0)
2013–2015	Hyde	79	(11)
2015–2016	FC Halifax Town	41	(4)
2015	→ Bradford Park Avenue (loan)	4	(0)
2016–2017	Worcester City	4	(0)
2017	Warrington Town		
2017–2018	Stalybridge Celtic	26	(6)
2018–2019	Curzon Ashton	18	(2)
2019	→ Atherton Collieries (loan)	11	(2)
2019–2020	Ashton United	10	(1)
2019–2020	→ Hyde United (loan)	5	(1)
2020	→ Radcliffe (loan)	7	(0)
2020–2021	Widnes		
2021	Bury	0	(0)
2021–2022	Daisy Hill		
2022–2024	Witton Albion	44	(23)
2024–2025	Darwen	22	(14)
2025	Daisy Hill	5	(1)
2025–2026	Mossley		
2026	Nelson	15	(7)
- * Club domestic league appearances and goals as of 15:33, 22 May 2026 (UTC)

Connor Niall Hughes (born 6 May 1993) is an English semi-professional footballer who plays as a midfielder for Nelson. He played for Oldham Athletic in the Football League as a professional footballer.

== Career ==
=== Oldham Athletic ===
Hughes started playing junior football at his local side Mosley Common before joining the youth system at Oldham Athletic, going on to sign a two-year scholarship in May 2009. Towards the end of his scholarship he featured on the bench as an unused substitute for the 1–1 draw against Yeovil Town at Huish Park in April 2011. He followed in the footsteps of youth teammate James Tarkowski, committing his future at Boundary Park by signing a two-year professional contract in June 2011.

He missed the early part of the 2011–12 season due to a training ground injury, where it was feared that he might have broken his leg in a tackle, however, an x-ray confirmed that he had minimal ligament damage. He had to wait until the 17 March 2012 to made his professional first-team debut, when he came on as a substitute in a 3–2 defeat to Rochdale in League One. Manager, Paul Dickov, used him another three times as a substitute during the season as Oldham finished in 16th place.

He was again used sparingly by Dickov during the 2012–13 season, being restricted to six substitute appearances as Oldham struggled near the bottom of the table. Dickov was replaced by Lee Johnson in March 2013, but Hughes failed to feature under him. He was released by Oldham in the summer of 2013 along with five other players following the expiration of his contract.

=== Non-League ===
==== Hyde ====
Following his release from Oldham, he dropped into Non-League football when he signed for Conference Premier side Hyde on a two-year deal, becoming the club's first signing of the summer. The club were managed by former Oldham stalwart, Scott McNiven, and were only one of a number of part-time sides in the division. The season started terribly for Hyde with an 8–0 loss away to Forest Green Rovers in the league, but Hughes remained an unused substitute. He made his debut for the club on 17 August 2013, coming on as a second-half substitute in Hyde's 2–2 draw with Hereford United. He scored his first league goal for the club in their 5–2 home defeat to Wrexham on 28 December 2013. Hyde had a miserable campaign, with it taking until January 2014 for them to record their first and only league victory, beating Welling United 2–0 following a winless league run of 29 games, with Hughes scoring the second. Hughes remained a regular, featuring 37 times in the league as Hyde finished rock bottom with a Conference record low of 10 points. They faired better in the Manchester Premier Cup, with Hughes scoring five goals in four games as Hyde reached the final, only to be defeated by Trafford on penalties at Gigg Lane.

Hyde's downward trajectory couldn't be stopped in the 2014–15 season as they struggled to adapt to life in the Conference North, only winning one of their opening 20 league games. McNiven was replaced by former Hyde manager, Gary Lowe, in January 2015, but he only managed to win one league game before the end of the campaign. Hyde finished rock bottom again, suffering their second consecutive relegation but Hughes featured in every league game and finished as top goalscorer with seven. He subsequently left the club following the expiration of his contract having featured in 94 games for the club, scoring 25 goals.

==== FC Halifax Town ====
He joined Halifax on 15 July 2015. Bradford Park Avenue signed Hughes on a month's loan in October 2015.

In November 2017 he joined Stalybridge Celtic.

In the summer of 2018 he joined Curzon Ashton, moving to Ashton United the following summer. On 20 December 2019, Hughes returned to Hyde on a one-month loan. He then joined Radcliffe F.C. on a one-month loan on 1 February 2020. The deal was later extended.

In September 2020 he joined Widnes.

In July 2021, Hughes joined North West Counties Football League Division One North club Daisy Hill, despite having signed for Bury the following week. Following an impressive first season, he signed a two-year contract upon the conclusion of the 2021–22 season.

On 12 November 2022, Hughes joined NPL Division One West side Witton Albion. Following a strong start to his time at the club, he signed an eighteen-month contract in January 2023 before suffering a leg injury that ruled him out for the remainder of the season.

In August 2024, he signed for Darwen on a player-coaching basis.

== Career statistics ==
As of match played 3 May 2025

Appearances and goals by club, season and competition
Club	Season	League			FA Cup		League Cup		Other		Total	
Club	Season	Division	Apps	Goals	Apps	Goals	Apps	Goals	Apps	Goals	Apps	Goals
Oldham Athletic	2010–11	League One	0	0	0	0	0	0	0	0	0	0
Oldham Athletic	2011–12	League One	4	0	0	0	0	0	0	0	4	0
Oldham Athletic	2012–13	League One	4	0	0	0	1	0	1 (Note: Appearances in Football League Trophy)	0	6	0
Oldham Athletic	Total		8	0	0	0	1	0	1	0	10	0
Hyde	2013–14	Conference Premier	37	4	1	0	—		7 (Note: One appearance in FA Trophy, four appearance & five goals in Manchester Premier Cup, two appearances & one goal in Cheshire Senior Cup)	6	45	10
Hyde	2014–15	Conference North	42	7	1	1	—		6 (Note: Two appearances & one goal in FA Trophy, two appearances & four goals in Manchester Premier Cup, two appearance & two goals in Cheshire Senior Cup)	7	49	15
Hyde	Total		79	11	2	1	—		13	13	94	25
FC Halifax Town	2015–16	National League	33	4	0	0	—		6 (Note: Appearances in FA Trophy)	2	39	6
Career total			120	15	2	1	1	0	20	15	143	31

== Honours ==
FC Halifax Town

- FA Trophy: 2015–16

Nelson

- North West Counties Football League Division One North: 2025–26
