= Kieran Lee =

English footballer (born 1988)

Personal information
- Full name: Kieran Christopher Lee
- Date of birth: 22 June 1988 (age 38)
- Place of birth: Stalybridge, England
- Height: 6 ft 1 in (1.85 m)
- Position: Midfielder

Youth career
- 2004–2006: Manchester United

Senior career*
Years	Team	Apps	(Gls)
2006–2008	Manchester United	1	(0)
2008	→ Queens Park Rangers (loan)	7	(0)
2008–2012	Oldham Athletic	117	(5)
2012–2020	Sheffield Wednesday	196	(20)
2021–2023	Bolton Wanderers	77	(10)
Total		398	(35)
- * Club domestic league appearances and goals

Kieran Christopher Lee (born 22 June 1988) is a former professional footballer who played as a central midfielder.

Lee began his career with Manchester United, before moving on to play for Oldham Athletic, Sheffield Wednesday, and Bolton Wanderers.

== Career ==
=== Manchester United ===
A central midfielder earlier in his career, he was deployed more often by Manchester United as a full back, either on the left or on the right. He signed for the club on a youth contract in July 2004, after impressing in the club's Under-17 team for the past two years. He continued to progress up the youth system, playing 25 times for the Under-18s in 2004–05, and making another 23 appearances in 2005–06. He also played in 16 matches for the Reserves that season, in various competitions.

His performances that season earned him a two-year professional contract with the club and, just three days after signing it, he was given his first taste of first team football, coming on as a second-half substitute for Wes Brown in Roy Keane's testimonial against Celtic at Old Trafford. In addition to this, he also made appearances in first team friendlies prior to the 2006–07 season, first coming on as a substitute for Phil Bardsley away to Preston North End, and then playing the full 90 minutes of a 2–1 victory over Macclesfield Town.

Lee's Reserve team performances were rewarded in the 2006–07 season by him being given the captain's armband. In between his 25 appearances for the Reserves that season, Lee also made his first team debut. He was named as a substitute in the League Cup Third Round tie against Crewe Alexandra and, with the score at 1–1, he came on for David Gray in the 77th minute. The match went to extra time and, with less than two minutes remaining, Lee made a charging run up from right back to latch onto an Alan Smith through-ball. He composed himself, and slid the ball coolly past Crewe's former Manchester United goalkeeper, Ben Williams.

This appearance was followed up by another in the Fourth Round of the League Cup, this time against Southend United. Lee came on for John O'Shea in the 75th minute, but was unable to rescue the team from a 1–0 loss. Towards the end of the season, United suffered a dearth of defenders, with Mikaël Silvestre, Patrice Evra, Gary Neville and Nemanja Vidić all out through injury at one time or another, so Lee was called into the squad for the matches against Milan and Everton, although he did not play in either game. He finally made his Premier League debut against Chelsea on 9 May 2007. Since the title race had been sewn up the game before, United manager Alex Ferguson was able to select a team of fringe players for the game, including Lee. At the end of the season, in recognition of his fine performances over the preceding 12 months, Lee was awarded the Denzil Haroun Reserve Team Player of the Year award.

On 12 December 2007, Lee was again named as a substitute for the Champions League game against Roma, but did not get to play. It was announced on 28 December 2007 that Lee would be joining Queens Park Rangers on loan from 2 January 2008. He would then be eligible to play for QPR against Chelsea in the FA Cup on 5 January.

=== Oldham Athletic ===
After spending four months on loan at QPR, making seven appearances, Lee became Oldham Athletic's first signing of summer 2008. Moving on a free transfer, Lee signed a two-year contract with the Latics, beginning on 1 July 2008. His first game with Oldham came in the League Cup second round in a 3–0 loss to Burnley. On 26 December, he made his league debut for Oldham in a 3–0 win versus Crewe Alexandra, assisting in the final goal by Lee Hughes.

His first goal for Oldham was a 95th-minute equaliser against Swindon Town on 22 August 2009, and after struggling to make an impression in the previous season, he appeared far more regularly from then on, becoming the regular choice at right back as the season progressed. He maintained this progress under new manager Paul Dickov, and for the rest of his career at Boundary Park he made the right back position his own. He signed a new one-year contract with Oldham Athletic on 4 March 2011. and on 27 April 2011, he won four Player of the Year awards for Oldham including Players' Player of the Year and Fans' Player of the Year, as well as the honours from Boundary Blues and Oldham Athletic Supporters Association.

Kieran Lee scored his first goal of the 2011–12 season against Chesterfield with a 25-yard strike to the bottom left hand corner in a 5–2 win for the Latics. He also dominated the end-of-season awards presentation in May 2012, again winning the Latics' 4 'Player of the Year' awards.

=== Sheffield Wednesday ===
On 28 May 2012, Lee signed a three-year deal with newly promoted Championship club Sheffield Wednesday, after rejecting the offer of a new contract with Oldham. Lee initially struggled for game time, making only one league start in the first half of the 2012-13 season. With Wednesday in 23rd position in the table at Christmas, Lee was brought in to the right midfield position, playing all but two of the remaining games that season helping lift Wednesday to a safe 18th place finish.

Lee was dealt a blow at the start of his second season with the Owls, suffering a hip injury in pre-season which required surgery and meant that he missed most of the first half of the season. Lee made his first appearance of the 2013–14 season on 3 December 2013 in a 2-1 win over Leicester City. The appointment of Stuart Gray as Sheffield Wednesday manager in January 2014 saw Lee move to a central role in midfield, utilising his athleticism as a box-to-box midfielder which became his signature position throughout the remainder of his time with the Owls. Lee provided 2 assists as Wednesday beat Leeds United 6-0 on 11 January 2014, earning him a place in the Championship Team of the Week. Lee scored his first goal for Sheffield Wednesday on the final day of the season in a 2-1 loss to Ipswich Town. Lee finished the season with 26 league appearances, 1 goal and 4 assists.

The 2014–15 season saw Lee continue in the box-to-box midfield role, returning 6 goals across 33 league appearances that season as Wednesday finished 13th in the table. He finished 3rd in Sheffield Wednesday's Player of the Month vote in both February and March 2015, the latter after Lee scored a memorable 95th minute winning goal in a local derby game against Rotherham United. His performances were enough for him to be offered a new two-year contract in June 2015.

Under new ownership and with Carlos Carvalhal installed as manager, Sheffield Wednesday made a number of new signings for the 2015–16 season including midfielders Barry Bannan, Ross Wallace and Álex López, casting doubt on Kieran Lee's position in the first team. Despite this, Lee had his best season in a Wednesday shirt, making 43 league appearances and scoring 5 goals. He was named Wednesday's Player of the Month in September 2015 and finished 3rd in the clubs annual Player of the Year awards. Sheffield Wednesday finished the season in 6th position, their highest league finish in 16 years, qualifying the team for the play-offs with promotion to the Premier League at stake. Lee scored the 2nd goal as Sheffield Wednesday beat Brighton 2-0 at Hillsborough in the first leg of the play-offs. Wednesday then held on for a 1-1 draw in the return leg, securing a place in the play-off final at Wembley Stadium. Lee played the full 90 minutes as Sheffield Wednesday lost 1-0 to Hull City in the 2016 Championship play-off final, narrowly missing out on promotion. Lee signed a 3-year contract extension in July 2016.

Lee started the 2016–17 season strongly, winning the clubs Player of the Month award in September 2016 after scoring a stoppage time winner in the 3-2 win over Bristol City and both goals in the 2-1 win over Nottingham Forest that month. Lee started every league game in the first half of the season until a hip injury ruled him out of the Boxing Day match against Newcastle United. He underwent surgery in January 2017 with the injury expected to rule him out for the remainder of the season. Lee returned to the first team in April 2017, playing in the final three fixtures of the regular season. Lee scored the winning goal in a 1-0 win over Ipswich Town, securing Sheffield Wednesday's spot in the play-offs for the second consecutive season with a 4th place finish. Wednesday were defeated in the 2017 play-offs semi-final by Huddersfield Town on penalties after the two games ended 0-0 and 1-1 with Lee playing the complete game in both legs and scoring his penalty in the shoot-out.

His 2017–18 season was plagued by a persistent hip injury which ruled him out of the first six games of the season. Lee made 15 league appearances, scoring 3 goals before the hip injury recurred, requiring work with a specialist in December 2017. He resumed training in August 2018 but further injury ruled him out for almost all of the 2018-19 season. He returned to first team action on 27 April 2019, coming on as a substitute in the 3-3 draw with Preston North End. Despite almost 18 months on the sidelines, Lee signed a new one-year contract with Sheffield Wednesday in July 2019.

The 2019–20 season saw Kieran Lee return to regular first team action, making 28 league appearances and contributing 5 assists. On 24 June 2020, he signed a one-month extension to cover the rest of the season which was delayed due to the coronavirus pandemic. He left Sheffield Wednesday in July 2020 at the expiry of his contract having made 216 appearances across all competitions in his 8 year spell at the club, scoring 22 goals.

=== Bolton Wanderers ===
On 8 January 2021, Lee signed an 18-month contract with EFL League Two side Bolton Wanderers after spending the previous few weeks training at the University of Bolton Stadium. He made his debut on 13 January 2021, starting and playing 71 minutes in a 1–1 draw against Exeter City. He scored his first goal in the 2-1 win against Walsall on 20 March. This was his first goal since scoring against Bolton for Sheffield Wednesday in October 2017. On 5 November, he signed a one-year contract extension extending it to 2023. On 2 April, he came on as a substitute in the 2023 EFL Trophy final against Plymouth Argyle. Bolton went on to win 4–0. On 23 May the club confirmed that Lee would be leaving at the end of his contract in June.

== Career statistics ==
As of match played 13 May 2023

Appearances and goals by club, season and competition
Club	Season	League			FA Cup		League Cup		Other		Total	
Club	Season	Division	Apps	Goals	Apps	Goals	Apps	Goals	Apps	Goals	Apps	Goals
Manchester United	2006–07	Premier League	1	0	0	0	2	1	0	0	3	1
Manchester United	2007–08	Premier League	0	0	–		0	0	0	0	0	0
Manchester United	Total		1	0	0	0	2	1	0	0	3	1
Queens Park Rangers (loan)	2007–08	Championship	7	0	1	0	–		–		8	0
Oldham Athletic	2008–09	League One	7	0	1	0	1	0	1 (Note: Appearances in Football League Trophy)	0	10	0
Oldham Athletic	2009–10	League One	24	1	1	0	0	0	1	0	26	1
Oldham Athletic	2010–11	League One	43	2	0	0	1	0	1	0	45	2
Oldham Athletic	2011–12	League One	43	2	4	0	1	0	5	0	53	2
Oldham Athletic	Total		117	5	6	0	3	0	8	0	134	5
Sheffield Wednesday	2012–13	Championship	23	0	2	0	1	0	–		26	0
Sheffield Wednesday	2013–14	Championship	26	1	3	0	0	0	–		29	1
Sheffield Wednesday	2014–15	Championship	33	6	1	0	0	0	–		34	6
Sheffield Wednesday	2015–16	Championship	43	5	2	0	4	1	3 (Note: Appearances in Championship play-offs)	1	52	7
Sheffield Wednesday	2016–17	Championship	26	5	0	0	0	0	2	0	28	5
Sheffield Wednesday	2017–18	Championship	15	3	0	0	0	0	–		15	3
Sheffield Wednesday	2018–19	Championship	2	0	0	0	0	0	–		2	0
Sheffield Wednesday	2019–20	Championship	28	0	2	0	0	0	–		30	0
Sheffield Wednesday	Total		196	20	10	0	5	1	5	1	216	22
Bolton Wanderers	2020–21	League Two	20	2	–		–		–		20	2
Bolton Wanderers	2021–22	League One	25	5	2	0	2	0	1	1	31	6
Bolton Wanderers	2022–23	League One	32	3	1	0	2	0	6 (Note: Five appearances in EFL Trophy, one appearance in League One play-offs)	0	41	3
Bolton Wanderers	Total		77	10	3	0	4	0	7	1	91	11
Career totals			398	36	20	0	14	2	20	2	452	40

== Honours ==
Bolton Wanderers

- EFL League Two third-place promotion: 2020–21
- EFL Trophy: 2022–23

Individual

- Denzil Haroun Reserve Team Player of the Year: 2006–07
