= Cedric Evina =

Cameroonian footballer

Personal information
- Full name: David Cedric Yannick Evina-Si
- Date of birth: 16 November 1991 (age 35)
- Place of birth: Cameroon
- Height: 1.75 m (5 ft 9 in)
- Position: Left wing back

Youth career
- 2000–2010: Arsenal

Senior career*
Years	Team	Apps	(Gls)
2010–2011	Arsenal	0	(0)
2010–2011	→ Oldham Athletic (loan)	12	(1)
2011	Oldham Athletic	15	(1)
2011–2014	Charlton Athletic	23	(0)
2014–2018	Doncaster Rovers	77	(1)
2017–2018	→ Crawley Town (loan)	34	(0)
2018–2019	Notts County	17	(0)
2020	Romford	0	(0)
- * Club domestic league appearances and goals as of 15:38, 29 May 2019 (UTC)

David Cedric Yannick Evina-Si (born 16 November 1991) is a Cameroonian professional footballer who plays as a defender or midfielder.

== Club career ==
=== Arsenal ===
As a nine-year-old playing district football in Barnet, Evina was invited by Liam Brady's scouting team for a trial. He then signed up and made his way up through the club's youth teams. He signed professional terms with the club in August 2009 and then followed this up with captaining the club's 2009–10 FA Youth Cup side, as well being a key part of the FA Premier Academy League winning team. He also played 11 times for the Reserves.

On 5 October 2010, he joined Oldham Athletic on loan until 4 January 2011. He made his Football League debut on 9 October 2010 in a League One match against Brentford. He scored his first ever professional goal against Rochdale on 27 November 2010.

=== Oldham Athletic ===
On 28 January 2011, Evina was signed on a free transfer by Paul Dickov after being released from Arsenal and impressing on his loan. Evina's first goal after signing came in a 4–0 win against Hartlepool United with a strike in the top right hand corner. Evina went on to make a further 14 appearances for Oldham, predominantly occupying the left-back spot and occasionally left-wing. His impressive performances during the season earned Evina Oldham's Young Player of the Year award. At the end of the 2010–11 season he was offered a new contract by Oldham. On 9 June it was confirmed by the club that Evina had rejected a new contract for personal reasons. Evina stated in an interview with the club that "Manchester is a long way from home and I decided I wanted to be closer to my family", and went on to state it was nothing to do with the club or the monetary contract.

=== Charlton Athletic ===
Evina signed a two-year contract at Charlton Athletic in June 2011. He found first team opportunities limited at Charlton in the 2011–12 season and made only one start for the club. Following an injury to regular left-back Rhoys Wiggins against Crystal Palace at the start of the 2012–13 season, Evina was subsequently handed a run of games in the side. However, he too picked up an injury which left him out of the side for almost two months. With Wiggins still sidelined, Evina returned to the fold and impressed the fans with some solid performances. On 19 July 2013, Evina signed a new one-year deal. On 22 May 2014, he was released from Charlton Athletic.

=== Doncaster Rovers ===
Evina signed for Doncaster Rovers on 30 July 2014 on a two-year contract.

On 12 December 2015, Evina signed a new two-and-a-half-year contract which will see him remain at Keepmoat Stadium until the summer of 2018.

On 30 June 2017, Evina joined League Two side Crawley Town on a season-long loan.

=== Notts County ===
On 14 September 2018, Evina signed for Notts County.

He was released by Notts County at the end of the 2018–19 season.

=== Romford ===
On 15 January 2020, Evina signed for Romford. However, after a couple of training sessions with Romford in January, he decided it wasn't for him and extended his hiatus to work on projects outside of football.

== International career ==
Evina is eligible to play for three countries, Cameroon, where he was born, France, where he grew up and England, where he has lived for several years. He was named in the provisional squad for France's Under-20 team for the 2011 Toulon Tournament, however he did not make the final cut and was not chosen for the final squad.

== Career statistics ==
As of match played 19 January 2019.

Appearances and goals by club, season and competition
Club	Season	League			FA Cup		EFL Cup		Other		Total	
Club	Season	Division	Apps	Goals	Apps	Goals	Apps	Goals	Apps	Goals	Apps	Goals
Arsenal	2010–11	Premier League	0	0	0	0	0	0	0	0	0	0
Oldham Athletic (loan)	2010–11	League One	12	1	1	0	0	0	0	0	13	1
Oldham Athletic	2010–11	League One	15	1	0	0	0	0	0	0	15	1
Charlton Athletic	2011–12	League One	3	0	3	0	2	0	1	0	9	0
Charlton Athletic	2012–13	Championship	12	0	1	0	1	0	—		14	0
Charlton Athletic	2013–14	Championship	8	0	2	0	2	0	—		12	0
Charlton Athletic	Total		23	0	6	0	5	0	1	0	35	0
Doncaster Rovers	2014–15	League One	19	0	0	0	3	0	2	0	24	0
Doncaster Rovers	2015–16	League One	42	1	3	0	2	0	2	0	49	1
Doncaster Rovers	2016–17	League Two	16	0	1	0	0	0	4	0	21	0
Doncaster Rovers	Total		77	1	4	0	5	0	8	0	94	1
Crawley Town (loan)	2017–18	League Two	34	0	0	0	0	0	0	0	34	0
Notts County	2018–19	League Two	17	0	1	0	0	0	1	0	19	0
Romford	2019–20	Isthmian League North Division	0	0	0	0	0	0	0	0	0	0
Career total			178	3	12	0	10	0	10	0	210	3

== Honours ==
- Oldham Athletic Young Player of the Year Award: 2011
