= Djeny Bembo-Leta =

Congolese footballer (born 1991)

Personal information
- Date of birth: 9 November 1991 (age 34)
- Place of birth: Kinshasa, Zaire
- Height: 1.83 m (6 ft 0 in)
- Position: Forward

Youth career
- ?–2009: Oldham Athletic

Senior career*
Years	Team	Apps	(Gls)
2009–2012	Oldham Athletic	3	(0)
2012	→ Stalybridge Celtic (loan)	8	(0)
2012	Radcliffe Borough		
2012	Northwich Victoria		
2012	Floriana		
2012–	Wolfsdonk		
2013–	Droylsden		
2015	Buxton		
2016	Droylsden		
- * Club domestic league appearances and goals as of 20:45, 7 May 2012 (UTC)

Djeny Bembo-Leta (born 9 November 1991) is a Congolese professional footballer who plays as a forward. (Note: Djeny Bembo-Leta at WorldFootball.net)

== Career ==
=== Oldham Athletic ===
Bembo-Leta made his debut on 1 September 2009 for Oldham Athletic in their 2–1 home defeat to Accrington Stanley in the Football League Trophy, replacing Kieran Lee in the 85th minute as a substitute.

In April 2010 he was awarded his first professional contract, a two-year deal.

He made his second appearance for the team on 10 August 2010 in a League Cup match against Scunthorpe, where he scored his first senior goal.

He made his Football League debut on 14 August 2010 in the 3–0 win over Notts County.

He was released by Oldham at the end of the 2011–12 season, along with eight other players.

==== Stalybridge Celtic (loan) ====
In the January transfer window of 2012, Bembo-Leta joined Stalybridge Celtic on loan for the rest of the season.

=== Radcliffe Borough ===
In October 2012 he joined Radcliffe Borough.

=== Northwich Victoria ===
The following month he joined Northwich Victoria.

=== Floriana ===
He then moved to Malta, appearing for Floriana.

=== Wolfsdonk ===
Following on from this, he moved to Belgium, joining Wolfsdonk.

=== Droylsden ===
In October 2013 he joined Droylsden.

=== Buxton ===
In 2015 he joined Buxton.

In a match for Buxton against Blyth Spartans in 2016, Buxton history was made when he and his twin, Fabrice came off the bench to join their brother, Joel, to become the first trio of siblings to appear for the club in a game.

=== Droylsden ===
In March 2016 he rejoined Droylsden.

== Personal life ==
He has two brothers, one of which is a twin, Fabrice; and the other, Joel, who both of whom also played for teams at Oldham Athletic but who have since been released. Fabrice was released by Stalybridge Celtic after being remanded in custody in August 2011, accused of involvement in looting during the 2011 England riots. He was later jailed for 32 months.

== Career statistics ==
As of match played 31 August 2010

Appearances and goals by club, season and competition
Club	Season	League			National cup		League cup		Continental		Other (Note: Includes FA Community Shield, UEFA Super Cup, Intercontinental Cup, FIFA Club World Cup, Football League Trophy)		Total	
Club	Season	Division	Apps	Goals	Apps	Goals	Apps	Goals	Apps	Goals	Apps	Goals	Apps	Goals
Oldham Athletic	2010–11	Football League One	3	0	0	0	1	1	–		1	0	5	1
Oldham Athletic	2009–10	Football League One	0	0	0	0	0	0	–		1	0	1	0
Career total			3	0	0	0	1	1	0	0	1	0	6	1
