= Rodrigue Dikaba =

Footballer (born 1985)

Personal information
- Date of birth: 28 October 1985 (age 41)
- Place of birth: Toulouse, France
- Height: 1.75 m (5 ft 9 in)
- Positions: Defender; midfielder

Senior career*
Years	Team	Apps	(Gls)
2003–2006	Arras		
2006–2009	Beauvais	87	(1)
2009–2010	Ceahlăul Piatra Neamţ	7	(0)
2010	Oldham Athletic	1	(0)
2011	Beauvais	7	(0)
2012–2014	RBD Borinage	60	(0)
2014–2015	Seraing United	28	(3)
2015–2018	F91 Dudelange	57	(3)
2018–2022	Fola Esch	60	(5)
2022	Racing FC Union Luxembourg	2	(0)
2022–2023	US Thionville Lusitanos		

International career
2008–2011	DR Congo	11	(0)
- * Club domestic league appearances and goals

Rodrigue Dikaba (born 28 October 1985) is a former professional footballer who played as a defender or midfielder. Born in France, he represented the DR Congo national team internationally.

== Career ==
Dikaba was born in Toulouse, France.

He made his first cap for Congo DR national team against Gabon on 25 March 2008.

Dikaba officially signed a short-term deal with Oldham Athletic on Friday 20 August 2010. Oldham manager Paul Dickov said of Dikaba, "His attitude is spot on, he is hungry and a very good defender. And he also fits the bill in being a good age,"

He started his only game for the Latics against Bristol Rovers on 4 September 2010 playing on the right side of midfield. He additionally made one additional appearance as a substitute in a Football League Trophy match.

On 18 October 2010, Dikaba was released from his Oldham contract having spent less than two months at the club. He had been injured on international duty and then had defied manager Paul Dickov's instructions to return to the club for treatment, opting to see his own doctor in Paris.

After three years playing for Luxembourg National Division club F91 Dudelange, Dikaba moved to league rivals Fola Esch.

== Honours ==
F91 Dudelange

- Luxembourg National Division: 2015–16, 2016–17, 2017–18
- Luxembourg Cup: 2015–16, 2016–17
