= James Wesolowski =

Australian soccer player (born 1987)

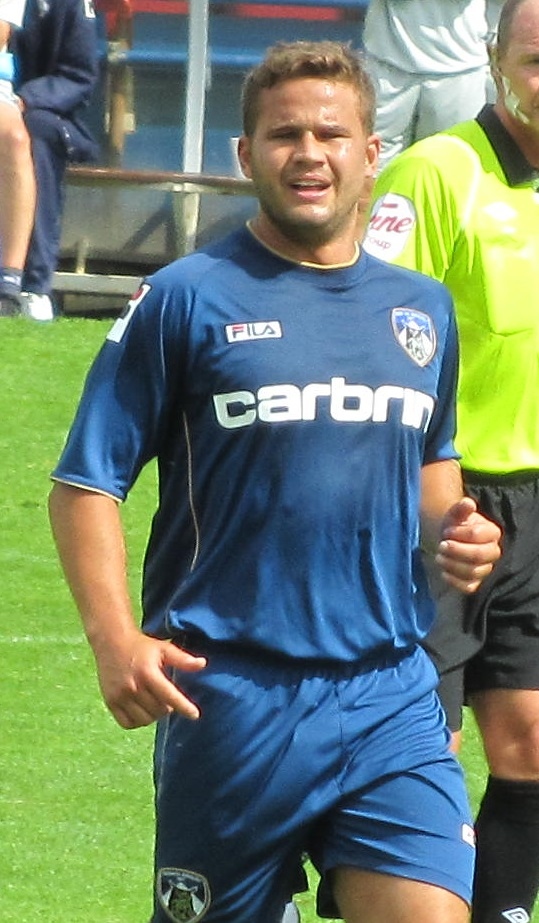
- Wesolowski playing for Oldham Athletic in 2012

Personal information
- Full name: James Peter Wesolowski
- Date of birth: 25 August 1987 (age 39)
- Place of birth: Sydney, Australia
- Position: Midfielder

Youth career
- 2002: Northern Spirit
- 2002–2006: Leicester City

Senior career*
| Years | Team | Apps | (Gls) |
| 2006–2010 | Leicester City | 46 | (0) |
| 2008 | → Cheltenham Town (loan) | 4 | (0) |
| 2009 | → Dundee United (loan) | 8 | (0) |
| 2009–2010 | → Hamilton Academical (loan) | 29 | (4) |
| 2010–2011 | Peterborough United | 32 | (2) |
| 2011–2014 | Oldham Athletic | 93 | (7) |
| 2014–2016 | Shrewsbury Town | 26 | (1) |
| 2016–2018 | Guiseley | 19 | (0) |
| 2018 | Nuneaton Borough | 9 | (0) |
| 2019 | Hereford | 3 | (0) |
| Total | | 269 | (14) |

International career
| 2005 | Australia U20 | 2 | (2) |
- * Club domestic league appearances and goals

James Peter Wesolowski (born 25 August 1987) is an Australian former professional soccer player who played as a midfielder.

== Club career ==
=== Leicester City ===
Wesolowski played for Australian side Northern Spirit before signing for Leicester City in 2002. After showing a lot of potential in the reserves, Wesolowski played for Leicester in a pre-season friendly against Celtic in 2005, but suffered a broken leg due to a challenge from Bobo Baldé. He underwent surgery on the leg but the injury sidelined him until the start of 2006. Wesolowski returned and impressed for the Leicester first team, making his debut at home to Cardiff City in January 2006. However, after only five appearances, he broke his same leg against Brighton in February.

The departure of Joey Guðjónsson gave Wesolowski the opportunity to become a first team regular, although he still faced stiff competition from teammates Stephen Hughes and Andy Johnson for the central midfield spot. He scored his first senior goal in a 4–3 FA Cup defeat to Fulham on 17 January 2007.

In July 2007, Wesolowski agreed to a contract extension with Leicester that would see him remain at the club until 2011. He scored his second goal of his career in a 1–0 League Cup win over Accrington Stanley on 14 August 2007, before being sidelined for six weeks with a hamstring injury on 18 September in a 3–2 League Cup win over Nottingham Forest. Wesolowski had more hamstring problems following recovery, and he was injured again on 8 December in a 2–1 defeat to West Brom, sidelining him until Christmas.

Wesolowski lost his place in the first team the following season, playing just four cup matches. On 2 October 2008, he joined Cheltenham Town on a three-month loan deal, linking up with former Leicester manager Martin Allen and fellow loanee Barry Hayles, with the option of being recalled after the first month. His loan ended early after suffering a fractured ankle in a 2–0 away defeat to Tranmere Rovers in October. On 2 February 2009, Wesolowski joined Dundee United on loan for the remainder of the 2008–09 season, with the option of making the deal permanent. He made his debut in a 1–0 home defeat to Hearts, playing for 65 minutes before being substituted.

On 4 August 2009, Wesolowski joined SPL side Hamilton Academical on loan for an initial six-month period, which was extended till the end of the season after some impressive run of form.

=== Peterborough United ===
On 1 June 2010, Wesolowski signed a two-year deal at Peterborough United for an undisclosed sum.

=== Oldham Athletic ===
On 8 August 2011, Wesolowski signed a one-year deal with league one club Oldham Athletic.

Wesolowski had his best season for the club yet in the 2013–14 season, he played nearly every game for the club & scored 5 goals, his best ever goal – scoring season. The vast improvement he had shown resulted in him scooping up 5 awards at the end of season awards, including Player of the Year.

On 7 May, when the clubs retained list was announced, it was confirmed that a formal contract offer had been made to Wesolowski. With Wesolowski stating that he "would love to stay here" and that he would like to come to an arrangement with the club over a new contract.

=== Shrewsbury Town ===
On 6 June 2014, despite a contract offer from Oldham, Wesolowski moved to Shrewsbury Town in League Two on a free transfer. He made his debut on the opening day of the season, coming on as a substitute in a 2–2 draw away at AFC Wimbledon, and was a regular in the first team squad until suffering a season-ending injury in a home match against Hartlepool United on 17 January 2015 where he ruptured two knee ligaments. He scored his first and what turned out to be only goal for Shrewsbury in a 2–1 win over Portsmouth on 25 October 2014.

Wesolowski returned to the side following their promotion to League One, but suffered a further knee injury in September 2015 just three matches into his comeback, which was initially thought to rule him out for the rest of the season. After playing a full ninety minutes and scoring Shrewsbury's equalising goal in their Shropshire Senior Cup final win against local rivals AFC Telford United, he returned to the first team ahead of schedule in a home match against Sheffield United in April 2016. At the end of the season, Wesolowski was offered a new contract – reportedly on reduced terms – and was still training with the first-team during the following pre-season. He was later reported to be training with National League side Lincoln City, but was unable to agree to a contract.

=== Guiseley ===
Wesolowski joined National League club Guiseley in October 2016.

== International career ==
Wesolowski was born in Australia, and is of Polish descent through his grandfather. Wesolowski received international acclaim at the end of the 2004–05 season after competing for Australia in the FIFA World Youth Championship and was labelled "a star in the making" by the Australian Football Federation. Wesolowski was called up to the Australian national team on his 19th birthday for the 2007 Asian Cup qualifier against Kuwait, but was withdrawn from the squad days later after consultation with medical staff from both parties 'on precautionary grounds'. On 6 November 2007, he was called up to the national team for a friendly match against Nigeria on 17 November, but was an unused substitute as Australia won 1–0.

== Career statistics ==
As of match played 21 November 2017

Appearances and goals by club, season and competition
| Club | Season | League | | | National Cup | | League Cup | | Other | | Total | |
| Club | Season | Division | Apps | Goals | Apps | Goals | Apps | Goals | Apps | Goals | Apps | Goals |
|---|---|---|---|---|---|---|---|---|---|---|---|---|
| Leicester City | 2005–06 | Championship | 5 | 0 | − | | − | | − | | 5 | 0 |
| Leicester City | 2006–07 | Championship | 19 | 0 | 2 | 1 | 3 | 0 | − | | 24 | 1 |
| Leicester City | 2007–08 | Championship | 22 | 0 | 1 | 0 | 2 | 1 | − | | 25 | 1 |
| Leicester City | 2008–09 | League One | 0 | 0 | 0 | 0 | 2 | 0 | 2 (Note: Appearances in the Football League Trophy) | 0 | 4 | 0 |
| Leicester City | 2009–10 | Championship | 0 | 0 | 0 | 0 | − | | − | | 0 | 0 |
| Leicester City | Total | | 46 | 0 | 3 | 1 | 7 | 1 | 2 | 0 | 58 | 2 |
| Cheltenham Town (loan) | 2008–09 | League One | 4 | 0 | − | | − | | − | | 4 | 0 |
| Dundee United (loan) | 2008–09 | Scottish Premier League | 8 | 0 | 0 | 0 | 0 | 0 | − | | 8 | 0 |
| Hamilton Academical (loan) | 2009–10 | Scottish Premier League | 29 | 4 | 0 | 0 | 1 | 0 | − | | 30 | 4 |
| Peterborough United | 2010–11 | League One | 32 | 2 | 3 | 0 | 2 | 0 | 2 | 0 | 39 | 2 |
| Oldham Athletic | 2011–12 | League One | 21 | 3 | 4 | 1 | 1 | 0 | 4 | 0 | 30 | 4 |
| Oldham Athletic | 2012–13 | League One | 33 | 0 | 5 | 0 | 1 | 0 | 0 | 0 | 39 | 0 |
| Oldham Athletic | 2013–14 | League One | 39 | 4 | 4 | 0 | 1 | 0 | 2 | 1 | 46 | 5 |
| Oldham Athletic | Total | | 93 | 7 | 13 | 1 | 3 | 0 | 6 | 1 | 115 | 9 |
| Shrewsbury Town | 2014–15 | League Two | 21 | 1 | 3 | 0 | 3 | 0 | 1 | 0 | 28 | 1 |
| Shrewsbury Town | 2015–16 | League One | 5 | 0 | 0 | 0 | 1 | 0 | 1 | 0 | 7 | 0 |
| Shrewsbury Town | Total | | 26 | 1 | 3 | 0 | 4 | 0 | 2 | 0 | 35 | 1 |
| Guiseley | 2016–17 | National League | 12 | 0 | 0 | 0 | − | | 1 (Note: Appearance in the FA Trophy) | 0 | 13 | 0 |
| Guiseley | 2017–18 | National League | 7 | 0 | 0 | 0 | 0 | 0 | 0 | 0 | 7 | 0 |
| Guiseley | Total | | 19 | 0 | 0 | 0 | 0 | 0 | 1 | 0 | 20 | 0 |
| Nuneaton Borough | 2018–19 | National League North | 9 | 0 | 0 | 0 | 0 | 0 | 0 | 0 | 9 | 0 |
| Hereford | 2018–19 | National League North | 3 | 0 | 0 | 0 | 0 | 0 | 1 | 0 | 4 | 0 |
| Career total | | | 269 | 14 | 22 | 2 | 17 | 1 | 14 | 1 | 322 | 18 |

== Honours ==
Peterborough United

- Football League One play-offs: 2011
