= Phillip McGrath =

Northern Irish footballer (born 1992)

Personal information
- Date of birth: 7 April 1992 (age 34)
- Place of birth: Banbridge, Northern Ireland
- Position: Midfielder

Youth career
- –2008: Glenavon Academy
- 2008–2010: Oldham Athletic

Senior career*
Years	Team	Apps	(Gls)
2010–2012	Oldham Athletic	1	(0)
2012	FC United of Manchester	1	(0)
2012	Salford City	3	(0)
Total		5	(0)

International career
2008	Northern Ireland U-17	2	(0)
- * Club domestic league appearances and goals

Phillip McGrath (born 7 April 1992) is a Northern Irish former football player, who is now a Foundation Hub Officer for The Manchester United Foundation, based at Werneth School, Stockport. He began his youth career at Glenavon Academy, making appearances for the Northern Ireland U-17 in 2008. He was signed by Oldham in 2008, but spent much of his time there side-lined by injuries. He subsequently joined FC United of Manchester and Salford City.

== Career ==
=== Early years ===
As a child he played for his home town side Banbridge Football Club as a youth and progressed to play for Glenavon Academy in the Lisburn Junior League and was awarded the Player's player of the year award in 2008.

=== Oldham Athletic ===
He moved to Oldham Athletic in the summer of 2008, joining the youth team on a two-year scholarship. His early career at the club was troubled by a succession of injuries. He was injured on international duty in his first year at the club, with damaged ankle ligaments keeping him out for three months. In 2009–10, he sustained medial ligament damage in a knee which kept him on the sidelines for a similar length of time, before then being out after a hernia operation.

In April 2010, he was awarded a one-year professional contract by the club after his injury-ravaged season. In September 2010 he was injured again, and had an operation to repair an anterior cruciate knee ligament. It was expected that this injury would keep him out for the rest of the season but in early April 2011 he made his comeback for Oldham's reserve team. He finally made his senior debut for the club on 30 April 2011, as an 89th-minute substitute in the League One match against Swindon Town.

At the end of the 2010–11 season, he was offered a new contract by Oldham which was signed on 12 May 2011. However, in July he was injured again, with a second cruciate ligament injury to his right knee in twelve months.

He was released by Oldham at the end of the 2011–12 season, along with eight other players.

=== FC United of Manchester ===
In September 2012, McGrath signed for FC United of Manchester. He made his debut in an FA Trophy match against Mossley on 29 September as a second-half substitute.

=== Salford City ===
In late 2012 he signed for Salford City.

== Post professional career ==
He is now a coach at Oldham Athletic coaching at Under 12 level, having passed his UEFA B in March 2014.

== International career ==
In September 2008 he was called up for the Under 17 Northern Ireland team. In September 2009 he was selected as a Northern Ireland standby player for the UEFA Under-19 Championship Qualifying Round Mini-Tournament in Bosnia & Herzegovina

== Career statistics ==
correct as of 13 October 2012

Club	Season	League		Cup		League Cup		Continental		Other		Total	
Club	Season	Apps	Goals	Apps	Goals	Apps	Goals	Apps	Goals	Apps	Goals	Apps	Goals
Oldham Athletic	2010–11	1	0	0	0	0	0	–		0	0	1	0
FC United of Manchester	2012–13	1	0	1	0	0	0	–		2	0	4	0
Career total		2	0	1	0	0	0	0	0	2	0	5	0
