= 2006–07 Oldham Athletic A.F.C. season =

Oldham Athletic A.F.C.
2006–07 season
- Chairman: Simon Blitz
- Manager: John Sheridan
- Stadium: Boundary Park
- League One: 6th (qualified for playoffs)
- Play-offs: Semi-finals
- FA Cup: Third round
- League Cup: First round
- Football League Trophy: Second round
- Top goalscorer: League: Chris Porter (21); All: Chris Porter (22)
- Highest home attendance: 12,154 vs. Blackpool
- Lowest home attendance: 2,118 vs. Chesterfield
- Average home league attendance: 6,334
Home colours	Away colours

During the 2006–07 English football season, Oldham Athletic A.F.C. competed in Football League One.

== Season summary ==
Oldham finished the season in sixth, qualifying for the playoffs, but were beaten 5–2 on aggregate by Blackpool in the semi-finals.

== First-team squad ==
Squad at end of season

Note: Flags indicate national team as defined under FIFA eligibility rules; some limited exceptions apply. Players may hold more than one non-FIFA nationality.

No.	Pos.	Nation	Player
1	GK	(Australia) AUS	Les Pogliacomi
2	DF	(England) ENG	Simon Charlton
3	DF	(Spain) ESP	Miki Roqué (on loan from Liverpool)
4	MF	(England) ENG	Craig Rocastle
5	DF	(Scotland) SCO	Will Haining
6	DF	(Netherlands) NED	Stefan Stam
7	MF	(England) ENG	Richie Wellens
9	FW	(France) FRA	Luigi Glombard (on loan from Cardiff City)
10	MF	(England) ENG	Neil Wood
11	MF	(England) ENG	Paul Edwards
12	FW	(England) ENG	Chris Hall
13	GK	(Northern Ireland) NIR	Alan Blayney
14	FW	(England) ENG	Paul Warne
15	MF	(Scotland) SCO	Gary McDonald
16	MF	(England) ENG	Sean Gregan

No.	Pos.	Nation	Player
18	MF	(England) ENG	Chris Taylor
20	DF	(England) ENG	Gareth Owen
21	FW	(England) ENG	Chris Porter
22	FW	(England) ENG	Andy Liddell
25	GK	(England) ENG	Terry Smith
26	FW	(England) ENG	Matty Barlow
27	MF	(England) ENG	Matthew Wolfenden
28	DF	(England) ENG	Chris Lever
29	MF	(England) ENG	Chris Baguley
30	MF	(England) ENG	Michael Pearson
31	DF	(England) ENG	Neal Trotman
35	DF	(Wales) WAL	Neal Eardley
38	FW	(England) ENG	Deane Smalley
39	GK	(England) ENG	Ryan Smith
51	DF	(England) ENG	Kelvin Lomax

=== Left club during season ===
Note: Flags indicate national team as defined under FIFA eligibility rules; some limited exceptions apply. Players may hold more than one non-FIFA nationality.

No.	Pos.	Nation	Player
3	DF	(England) ENG	Ben Turner (on loan from Coventry City)
8	MF	(England) ENG	Mark Hughes (to Chesterfield)
8	MF	(Poland) POL	Tomasz Cywka (on loan from Wigan Athletic)
8	FW	(England) ENG	Leon Clarke (on loan from Sheffield Wednesday)
9	FW	(England) ENG	Lewis Grabban (on loan from Crystal Palace)
13	GK	(England) ENG	Chris Howarth (on loan from Bolton Wanderers)
13	GK	(England) ENG	Adam Legzdins (on loan from Birmingham City)

No.	Pos.	Nation	Player
16	DF	(England) ENG	Rob Scott (to Macclesfield Town)
17	MF	(France) FRA	Moussa Dabo (released)
19	DF	(England) ENG	Marc Tierney (to Shrewsbury Town)
19	DF	(England) ENG	Hasney Aljofree (on loan from Plymouth Argyle)
23	DF	(England) ENG	Chris Swailes (to Hamilton Academical)
24	FW	(Switzerland) SUI	Maheta Molango (on loan from Brighton)
52	GK	(England) ENG	David Knight (on loan from Middlesbrough)

== Transfers ==
=== In ===
- Alan Blayney - unattached (last at Doncaster Rovers), 16 February
- Les Pogliacomi - Blackpool
- Neil Wood - Blackpool
- Simon Charlton - Norwich City
- Craig Rocastle - Sheffield Wednesday

=== Loan in ===
- Miki Roqué - Liverpool
- Luigi Glombard - Cardiff City

=== League One ===
5 August 2006 1	Tranmere Rovers	1–0	Oldham Athletic	Prenton
	Greenacre 24'; Ellison (yellow card) 33'	Report	Eardley (red card) 90'	Stadium: Prenton Park; Attendance: 8,586; Referee: Ray Olivier

8 August 2006 2	Oldham Athletic	0–1	Port Vale	Oldham
	Rocastle (yellow card) 90'	Report	Miles (yellow card) 22'; Sodje 66'	Stadium: Boundary Park; Attendance: 4,975; Referee: Neil Swarbrick

12 August 2006 3	Oldham Athletic	1–0	Swansea City	Oldham
	Hall (yellow card) 16'; Molango 67'; Warne (yellow card) 80'; Charlton (yellow card) 82'	Report	Knight (yellow card) 65'	Stadium: Boundary Park; Attendance: 4,708; Referee: Graham Laws

19 August 2006 4	Millwall	1–0	Oldham Athletic	London
	Shaw (yellow card) 77'; Hübertz 79'	Report	Wellens (yellow card) 77'; Tierney (yellow card) 90'	Stadium: The Den; Attendance: 7,455; Referee: Carl Boyeson

27 August 2006 5	Oldham Athletic	0–0	Carlisle United	Oldham
		Report	Raven (yellow card) 78'; Gray (yellow card) 90'; Murphy (yellow card) 90'	Stadium: Boundary Park; Attendance: 6,080; Referee: Graham Salisbury

2 September 2006 6	Bournemouth	3–2	Oldham Athletic	Bournemouth
	Hayter 28', 43'; Best (yellow card) 62'; Browning 90'	Report	Liddell 47' (pen.), 79'	Stadium: Dean Court; Attendance: 4,838; Referee: Mike Russell

9 September 2006 7	Oldham Athletic	1–0	Scunthorpe United	Oldham
	McDonald 34'; Eardley (yellow card) 48'; Edwards (yellow card) 54'	Report		Stadium: Boundary Park; Attendance: 4,812; Referee: Mike Pike

12 September 2006 8	Nottingham Forest	0–2	Oldham Athletic	Nottingham
	Lester (yellow card) 1'; Holt (yellow card) 80'	Report	Porter 29', 45' (yellow card) 85'	Stadium: City Ground; Attendance: 17,446; Referee: Darren Drysdale

16 September 2006 9	Blackpool	2–2	Oldham Athletic	Blackpool
	Vernon 41'; Southern (yellow card) 54'; Gillett (yellow card) 57'; Morrell 90' (yellow card) 90'; Evatt (yellow card) 90'	Report	Wellens (yellow card) 57' (goal) 63'; Porter 72' (yellow card) 80'	Stadium: Bloomfield Road; Attendance: 6,794; Referee: Michael Jones

23 September 2006 10	Oldham Athletic	4–1	Gillingham	Oldham
	Haining 4'; Porter 24', 90'; Charlton 46'	Report	Flynn 51' (pen.)	Stadium: Boundary Park; Attendance: 4,652; Referee: Trevor Kettle

26 September 2006 11	Oldham Athletic	2–1	Rotherham United	Oldham
	Wellens (yellow card) 29'; Haining (yellow card) 38'; Stam 51'; Warne 76'	Report	Mills (yellow card) 42'; Keane (yellow card) 63'; Hoskins 68'; Sharps (yellow card) 76'	Stadium: Boundary Park; Attendance: 4,880; Referee: Jonathan Moss

30 September 2006 12	Bristol City	0–0	Oldham Athletic	Bristol
	Murray (yellow card) 75'	Report	Warne (yellow card) 70'; Pogliacomi (yellow card) 90'	Stadium: Ashton Gate; Attendance: 11,656; Referee: Jarnail Singh

6 October 2006 13	Doncaster Rovers	1–1	Oldham Athletic	Doncaster
	Lee 23'; Heffernan (yellow card) 58'	Report	McDonald (yellow card) 36'; Porter 45'; Wellens (yellow card) 90'	Stadium: Belle Vue; Attendance: 6,241; Referee: Colin Webster

14 October 2006 14	Oldham Athletic	3–3	Leyton Orient	Oldham
	Rocastle (yellow card) 29'; Stam (yellow card) 42'; Porter 78', 82'; Liddell 90' (pen.)	Report	Ibehre 9'; Chambers (yellow card) 55'; Alexander 59', 86'; Miller (yellow card) 90'	Stadium: Boundary Park; Attendance: 5,014; Referee: Rob Lewis

21 October 2006 15	Yeovil Town	1–0	Oldham Athletic	Yeovil
	Skiverton 45'	Report	McDonald (yellow card) 13'; Charlton (yellow card) 69'; Haining (yellow card) 71'	Stadium: Huish Park; Attendance: 5,471; Referee: Danny McDermid

28 October 2006 16	Oldham Athletic	3–0	Brentford	Oldham
	Warne 15'; McDonald 47'; Stam (yellow card) 78'; Wellens 90'	Report	Carder-Andrews (yellow card) 53'; Heywood (yellow card) 69'; Osborne (yellow card) 90'	Stadium: Boundary Park; Attendance: 4,708; Referee: Pat Miller

4 November 2006 17	Cheltenham Town	1–2	Oldham Athletic	Cheltenham
	McCann (yellow card) 67'; Odejayi 90'	Report	Warne 23'; McDonald 41'; Haining (yellow card) 88'	Stadium: Whaddon Road; Attendance: 4,054; Referee: Dean Whitestone

18 November 2006 18	Oldham Athletic	2–0	Bradford City	Oldham
	Porter 79', 82'	Report		Stadium: Boundary Park; Attendance: 6,001; Referee: Nigel Miller

25 November 2006 19	Huddersfield Town	0–3	Oldham Athletic	Huddersfield
		Report	McDonald 16'; Porter 59'; Warne 67'	Stadium: Kirklees Stadium; Attendance: 13,280; Referee: Steve Tanner

5 December 2006 20	Oldham Athletic	1–0	Crewe Alexandra	Oldham
	McDonald (yellow card) 29'; Porter 45'	Report	Otsemobor (yellow card) 63'; Jones (yellow card) 65'	Stadium: Boundary Park; Attendance: 4,798; Referee: Russell Booth

9 December 2006 21	Chesterfield	2–1	Oldham Athletic	Chesterfield
	Larkin 14', 33'; Allott (yellow card) 67'	Report	Eardley 45'; Wellens (yellow card) 85'; Charlton (yellow card) 86'	Stadium: Saltergate; Attendance: 4,059; Referee: Eddie Ilderton

16 December 2006 22	Oldham Athletic	1–1	Brighton & Hove Albion	Oldham
	Warne 18'	Report	Fraser (yellow card) 58'; Hammond 61'	Stadium: Boundary Park; Attendance: 9,321; Referee: Andy Hall

23 December 2006 23	Oldham Athletic	3–0	Northampton Town	Oldham
	McDonald 22'; Porter 37'; Liddell 61'; Taylor (yellow card) 71'	Report	Bojic (yellow card) 50'; Watt (yellow card) 77'; Crowe (yellow card) 79'	Stadium: Boundary Park; Attendance: 5,662; Referee: Mike Pike

26 December 2006 24	Rotherham United	2–3	Oldham Athletic	Rotherham
	Bopp 54'; Hoskins 81' (pen.)	Report	Porter 29', 67'; Haining 42'; Charlton (yellow card) 80'; Pogliacomi (yellow card) 88'; Rocastle (yellow card) 90'	Stadium: Millmoor; Attendance: 6,512; Referee: Ray Olivier

30 December 2006 25	Gillingham	0–3	Oldham Athletic	Gillingham
	Cox (red card) 35'; Sancho (yellow card) 81'; Chorley (yellow card) 90'	Report	Wellens (yellow card) 23'; Porter 26', 28'; Eardley 54'; Haining (yellow card) 66'; Edwards (yellow card) 80'; Liddell 36' (pen.)	Stadium: Priestfield Stadium; Attendance: 6,790; Referee: Paul Taylor

1 January 2007 26	Oldham Athletic	5–0	Nottingham Forest	Oldham
	Warne 30'; Porter 39'; Liddell 43' (pen.), 68' (pen.); Rocastle 90'	Report	Clingan (red card) 21'; Southall (yellow card) 42'; Cullip (red card) 66'; Holt (yellow card) 69'	Stadium: Boundary Park; Attendance: 9,768; Referee: Kevin Friend

13 January 2007 27	Scunthorpe United	1–1	Oldham Athletic	Scunthorpe
	Foster (yellow card) 22'; Crosby (yellow card) 37'; Goodwin (yellow card) 42'; Gregan 54' (o.g.); Sharp (yellow card) 58'; Byrne (red card) 60'; Taylor (yellow card) 61' (yellow-red card) 64'; Murphy (yellow card) 85'; Baraclough (yellow card) 87'	Report	Wellens (yellow card) 61'; Rocastle (yellow card) 89'; McDonald 90'	Stadium: Glanford Park; Attendance: 7,685; Referee: Darren Deadman

20 January 2007 28	Oldham Athletic	0–3	Bristol City	Oldham
	Gregan (yellow card) 59'; McDonald (yellow card) 69'; Hall (yellow card) 86'	Report	Showunmi 9'; McCombe (yellow card) 16'; McAllister 37'; Andrews 65'; Noble (yellow card) 90'; Orr (yellow card) 90'	Stadium: Boundary Park; Attendance: 6,924; Referee: Mike Thorpe

28 January 2007 29	Northampton Town	2–3	Oldham Athletic	Northampton
	Kirk 24'; Robertson 88'	Report	Wellens 2'; Warne 44'; Porter 58'	Stadium: Sixfields Stadium; Attendance: 5,662; Referee: Mike Pike

3 February 2007 30	Oldham Athletic	1–0	Tranmere Rovers	Oldham
	Eardley (yellow card) 21'; Hall 90'; Liddell (yellow card) 90'; Wellens (red card) 90'	Report	Mullin (yellow card) 79'; Davies (yellow card) 85'; Ellison (yellow card) 89'; Ward (yellow card) 90'	Stadium: Boundary Park; Attendance: 6,944; Referee: Trevor Kettle

10 February 2007 31	Swansea City	0–1	Oldham Athletic	Swansea
	Robinson (yellow card) 51'; Lawrence (yellow card) 66'	Report	Warne 32'; Gregan (yellow card) 45'; Charlton (yellow card) 82'	Stadium: Liberty Stadium; Attendance: 9,880; Referee: Steve Tanner

17 February 2007 32	Oldham Athletic	1–2	Millwall	Oldham
	Warne 55'; Rocastle (yellow card) 65'; Haining (yellow card) 83'	Report	Dunne (yellow card) 10'; Byfield (yellow card) 42' (goal) 82' (pen.); Brammer (yellow card) 45'; Williams 61'; Hübertz (yellow card) 63'	Stadium: Boundary Park; Attendance: 6,181; Referee: Steve Bratt

20 February 2007 33	Port Vale	3–0	Oldham Athletic	Burslem
	Whitaker 18'; Walsh (yellow card) 45'; Weston (yellow card) 45'; Pilkington 49'; Kamara (yellow card) 54'; Constantine 79' (pen.)	Report	Edwards (yellow card) 51'; Taylor (yellow card) 63'; Pogliacomi (red card) 77'; McDonald (yellow card) 81'	Stadium: Vale Park; Attendance: 4,061; Referee: Richard Beeby

24 February 2007 34	Oldham Athletic	1–2	Bournemouth	Oldham
	Liddell 45' (pen.); Turner (red card) 90'	Report	Broadhurst (yellow card) 17'; McGoldrick 29'; Viðarsson 31'; Moss (yellow card) 45'; Young (yellow card) 45'; Browning (yellow card) 48'; Hollands (yellow card) 82'; Wilson (yellow card) 90'	Stadium: Boundary Park; Attendance: 5,429; Referee: Graham Laws

27 February 2007 35	Oldham Athletic	0–1	Blackpool	Oldham
	Haining (yellow card) 88'	Report	Morrell 67'; Hoolahan (yellow card) 73'; Parker (yellow card) 82'	Stadium: Boundary Park; Attendance: 6,956; Referee: Andy Penn

3 March 2007 36	Carlisle United	1–1	Oldham Athletic	Carlisle
	Aranalde (yellow card) 16'; Holmes 87'	Report	Taylor 13' (yellow card) 14'; Liddell (yellow card) 28'; Wellens (yellow card) 66'; Warne (yellow card) 72'	Stadium: Brunton Park; Attendance: 7,951; Referee: Carl Boyeson

11 March 2007 37	Oldham Athletic	4–0	Doncaster Rovers	Oldham
	Clarke 8'; Warne (yellow card) 31'; Rocastle 74'; Taylor 76', 90'	Report	Wilson (yellow card) 53'	Stadium: Boundary Park; Attendance: 6,619; Referee: Andre Marriner

17 March 2007 38	Leyton Orient	2–2	Oldham Athletic	Leyton
	Alexander 13' (yellow card) 33' (yellow-red card) 49'; Hooper 70'; Demetriou (yellow card) 79'	Report	Eardley (yellow card) 42'; Clarke (yellow card) 44'; Taylor 73'; Liddell 81' (pen.)	Stadium: Brisbane Road; Attendance: 5,443; Referee: Phil Joslin

25 March 2007 39	Brentford	2–2	Oldham Athletic	Brentford
	Richards 59'; Keith 85'; Griffiths (yellow card) 90'	Report	Aljofree (yellow card) 57'; Clarke 86', 90' (pen.)	Stadium: Griffin Park; Attendance: 4,720; Referee: Andy Hall

31 March 2007 40	Oldham Athletic	1–0	Yeovil Town	Oldham
	McDonald 37'	Report		Stadium: Boundary Park; Attendance: 6,035; Referee: Colin Webster

7 April 2007 41	Oldham Athletic	1–1	Huddersfield Town	Oldham
	Porter 23'; Gregan (yellow card) 34'	Report	McIntosh (yellow card) 38'; Beckett 78'	Stadium: Boundary Park; Attendance: 7,096; Referee: Andy Woolmer

9 April 2007 42	Bradford City	1–1	Oldham Athletic	Bradford
	Colbeck (yellow card) 24' (yellow-red card) 73'; Ashikodi 65' (yellow card) 77'; Edghill (yellow card) 90'	Report	Aljofree (yellow card) 30'; Liddell (yellow card) 40'; Gregan (yellow card) 64'; Glombard 87'; Rocastle (yellow card) 87'	Stadium: Valley Parade; Attendance: 9,940; Referee: Rob Lewis

14 April 2007 43	Oldham Athletic	0–2	Cheltenham Town	Oldham
		Report	Odejayi 22'; Finnigan 31' (yellow card) 34'; Gill (yellow card) 53'; Brown (yellow card) 74'	Stadium: Boundary Park; Attendance: 5,426; Referee: Keith Hill

21 April 2007 44	Crewe Alexandra	2–1	Oldham Athletic	Crewe
	Maynard 25', 71'; Woodards (yellow card) 36'; Williams (yellow card) 77'	Report	Gregan (yellow card) 17'; Haining (yellow card) 40'; Warne (yellow card) 77'; Wellens 85'	Stadium: Gresty Road; Attendance: 6,304; Referee: Mark Haywood

28 April 2007 45	Brighton & Hove Albion	1–2	Oldham Athletic	Brighton
	Bertin (yellow card) 54'; Cox 85'; El-Abd (yellow card) 87'; Rents (yellow card) 90'	Report	Porter 18'; Liddell 40'; Rocastle (yellow card) 87'	Stadium: Withdean Stadium; Attendance: 7,588; Referee: Mike Russell

5 May 2007 46	Oldham Athletic	1–0	Chesterfield	Oldham
	Porter 58'	Report	Allott (yellow card) 15'	Stadium: Boundary Park; Attendance: 8,148; Referee: Eddie Ilderton

=== Play-Offs ===
13 May 2007 SF	Oldham Athletic	1–2	Blackpool	Oldham
	Gregan (yellow card) 20'; Wellens (yellow card) 27'; Liddell 75' (pen.); Edwards (yellow card) 90'/	Report	Jørgensen (yellow card) 28'; Forbes (yellow card) 44'; Barker 52'; Parker (yellow card) 83'; Williams (yellow card) 86'; Hoolahan 87'	Stadium: Boundary Park; Attendance: 12,154; Referee: Iain Williamson

19 May 2007 SF	Blackpool	3–1	Oldham Athletic	Blackpool
	Southern 28' (yellow card) 38'; Parker (yellow card) 65' (goal) 90'; Morrell 75'	Report	Wellens (yellow card) 17'; Wolfenden 83'	Stadium: Bloomfield Road; Attendance: 9,453; Referee: Lee Probert

=== FA Cup ===
11 November 2006 1	Kettering Town	3–4	Oldham Athletic	Kettering
	Boucaud (yellow card) 40'; McIlwain 52' (yellow card) 60'; Abbey 62'; Solkhon 84'	Report	Gregan 43'; Warne 56'; Trotman 60'; Hall 90'	Stadium: Rockingham Road; Attendance: 3,481; Referee: Neil Swarbrick

1 December 2006 2	Kings Lynn	0–2	Oldham Athletic	King's Lynn
	Defty (yellow card) 62'	Report	Porter 10'; Hall 82'	Stadium: The Walks; Attendance: 5,444; Referee: Mike Thorpe

6 January 2007 3	Wolverhampton Wanderers	2–2	Oldham Athletic	Wolverhampton
	Potter (yellow card) 31'; Olofinjana 35'; Davies 42'	Report	Warne 19'; Hall 78'; Eardley (yellow card) 39'; McDonald (yellow card) 59'	Stadium: Molineux Stadium; Attendance: 14,524; Referee: Phil Crossley

16 January 2007 3	Oldham Athletic	0–2	Wolverhampton Wanderers	Oldham
	McDonald (yellow card) 42'	Report	Potter 56'; Davies 75'	Stadium: Boundary Park; Attendance: 9,628; Referee: Kevin Wright

=== Football League Cup ===
22 August 2006 1	Rotherham United	3–1	Oldham Athletic	Rotherham
	Sharps 48' (yellow card) 77'; Hoskins 54'; Woods (yellow card) 87'; Partridge 88'/	Report	Rocastle 41'; Eardley (yellow card) 76'	Stadium: Millmoor; Attendance: 3,065; Referee: Gary Sutton

=== Football League Trophy ===
1 November 2006	Oldham Athletic	0–1	Chesterfield	Oldham
		Report	Smith 19'	Stadium: Boundary Park; Attendance: 2,118; Referee: Tony Bates

== Statistics ==
=== Appearances and goals ===
No.	Pos	Nat	Player	Total		League 1		FA Cup		League Cup		League Trophy		L1 Play-Offs	
No.	Pos	Nat	Player	Apps	Goals	Apps	Goals	Apps	Goals	Apps	Goals	Apps	Goals	Apps	Goals
1	GK	(Australia) AUS	Les Pogliacomi	46	0	40+0	0	4+0	0	0+0	0	1+0	0	1+0	0
2	DF	(England) ENG	Simon Charlton	39	1	34+0	1	4+0	0	0+0	0	0+0	0	1+0	0
3	DF	(Spain) ESP	Miki Roqué	4	0	1+3	0	0+0	0	0+0	0	0+0	0	0+0	0
3	DF	(England) ENG	Ben Turner	1	0	1+0	0	0+0	0	0+0	0	0+0	0	0+0	0
4	MF	(Grenada) GRN	Craig Rocastle	39	3	17+18	2	0+2	0	1+0	1	0+0	0	1+0	0
5	DF	(Scotland) SCO	Will Haining	52	2	44+0	2	4+0	0	1+0	0	1+0	0	2+0	0
6	DF	(Netherlands) NED	Stefan Stam	26	1	19+3	1	2+0	0	1+0	0	1+0	0	0+0	0
7	MF	(England) ENG	Richie Wellens	50	4	42+0	4	4+0	0	1+0	0	0+1	0	2+0	0
8	FW	(England) ENG	Leon Clarke	5	3	5+0	3	0+0	0	0+0	0	0+0	0	0+0	0
8	MF	(Poland) POL	Tomasz Cywka	5	0	0+4	0	0+0	0	0+0	0	1+0	0	0+0	0
9	FW	(France) FRA	Luigi Glombard	10	1	3+5	1	0+0	0	0+0	0	0+0	0	0+2	0
9	FW	(England) ENG	Lewis Grabban	10	0	1+8	0	0+0	0	1+0	0	0+0	0	0+0	0
10	FW	(England) ENG	Neil Wood	7	0	3+2	0	0+0	0	1+0	0	1+0	0	0+0	0
11	MF	(England) ENG	Paul Edwards	32	0	10+16	0	1+2	0	1+0	0	0+0	0	1+1	0
12	FW	(England) ENG	Chris Hall	24	4	2+17	1	0+4	3	0+0	0	1+0	0	0+0	0
13	GK	(Northern Ireland) NIR	Alan Blayney	5	0	2+1	0	0+0	0	0+0	0	0+0	0	1+1	0
13	GK	(England) ENG	Chris Howarth	4	0	2+1	0	0+0	0	1+0	0	0+0	0	0+0	0
13	GK	(England) ENG	Adam Legzdins	1	0	0+0	0	0+0	0	0+0	0	0+1	0	0+0	0
14	FW	(England) ENG	Paul Warne	54	11	42+4	9	4+0	2	1+0	0	1+0	0	2+0	0
15	MF	(Scotland) SCO	Gary McDonald	49	7	39+4	7	4+0	0	0+0	0	0+0	0	1+1	0
16	DF	(England) ENG	Sean Gregan	31	1	27+0	0	2+0	1	0+0	0	0+0	0	2+0	0
18	MF	(England) ENG	Chris Taylor	50	4	40+4	4	3+0	0	0+0	0	1+0	0	2+0	0
19	DF	(England) ENG	Hasney Aljofree	5	0	5+0	0	0+0	0	0+0	0	0+0	0	0+0	0
19	DF	(England) ENG	Marc Tierney	8	0	1+4	0	0+1	0	0+1	0	1+0	0	0+0	0
21	FW	(England) ENG	Chris Porter	40	22	34+1	21	3+0	1	0+0	0	0+0	0	2+0	0
22	FW	(Scotland) SCO	Andy Liddell	54	11	44+2	10	4+0	0	1+0	0	1+0	0	2+0	1
23	DF	(England) ENG	Chris Swailes	4	0	4+0	0	0+0	0	0+0	0	0+0	0	0+0	0
24	FW	(Democratic Republic of the Congo) COD	Maheta Molango	6	1	3+2	1	0+0	0	0+1	0	0+0	0	0+0	0
25	GK	(England) ENG	Terry Smith	2	0	0+1	0	0+0	0	0+1	0	0+0	0	0+0	0
26	FW	(England) ENG	Matty Barlow	1	0	0+0	0	0+0	0	0+0	0	0+1	0	0+0	0
27	FW	(England) ENG	Matthew Wolfenden	8	1	0+6	0	1+0	0	0+0	0	0+0	0	0+1	1
30	DF	(Wales) WAL	Michael Pearson	1	0	0+1	0	0+0	0	0+0	0	0+0	0	0+0	0
31	DF	(England) ENG	Neal Trotman	2	1	0+1	0	0+1	1	0+0	0	0+0	0	0+0	0
35	DF	(Wales) WAL	Neal Eardley	41	2	36+0	2	3+0	0	1+0	0	0+0	0	1+0	0
38	MF	(England) ENG	Deane Smalley	2	0	0+2	0	0+0	0	0+0	0	0+0	0	0+0	0
51	MF	(England) ENG	Kelvin Lomax	12	0	3+6	0	1+0	0	0+0	0	1+0	0	1+0	0
52	GK	(England) ENG	David Knight	2	0	2+0	0	0+0	0	0+0	0	0+0	0	0+0	0
