= 2005–06 Oldham Athletic A.F.C. season =

Oldham Athletic
2005–06 season
- Chairman: Simon Blitz
- Manager: Ronnie Moore
- Stadium: Boundary Park
- Football League One: 10th
- FA Cup: Second round
- League Cup: First round
- Football League Trophy: First round
- Top goalscorer: Beckett (18)
- Highest home attendance: 7,772 vs. Barnsley
- Lowest home attendance: 2,226 vs. Carlisle United
Home colours	Away colours

During the 2005–06 English football season, Oldham Athletic competed in Football League One where they finished in 10th position with 65 points.

== Final league table ==
Pos	Team	Pld	W	D	L	GF	GA	GD	Pts
8	Doncaster Rovers	46	20	9	17	55	51	+4	69
9	Bristol City	46	18	11	17	66	62	+4	65
10	Oldham Athletic	46	18	11	17	58	60	−2	65
11	Bradford City	46	14	19	13	51	49	+2	61
12	Scunthorpe United	46	15	15	16	68	73	−5	60

Rules for classification: 1) Points; 2) Goal difference; 3) Goals scored

== Results ==
Oldham Athletic's score comes first

=== Legend ===
Win	Draw	Loss

=== Football League One ===
Match	Date	Opponent	Venue	Result	Attendance	Scorers
1	6 August 2005	Yeovil Town	H	2–0	6,979	Porter, Warne
2	9 August 2005	Swindon Town	A	3–2	5,294	Scott, Liddell (2 - 1 pen)
3	12 August 2005	Tranmere Rovers	A	0–4	8,466	
4	20 August 2005	Chesterfield	H	4–1	5,347	Liddell, Warne (2), Branston
5	27 August 2005	Colchester United	A	0–0	2,742	
6	29 August 2005	Rotherham United	H	0–1	6,950	
7	4 September 2005	Southend United	A	1–2	5,261	Bonner
8	10 September 2005	Huddersfield Town	H	0–3	6,803	
9	17 September 2005	Gillingham	A	1–0	6,259	Killen
10	24 September 2005	Bournemouth	H	1–0	5,058	Liddell pen
11	28 September 2005	Port Vale	A	2–2	3,796	Killen, Beckett
12	1 October 2005	Barnsley	A	0–4	8,077	
13	9 October 2005	Brentford	H	0–1	5,089	
14	15 October 2005	Swansea City	A	0–0	14,029	
15	22 October 2005	Bristol City	H	4–3	5,456	Liddell, Porter, Hughes, Wellens
16	29 October 2005	Scunthorpe United	A	2–4	5,055	Liddell (2)
17	13 November 2005	Doncaster Rovers	H	0–1	5,800	
18	19 November 2005	Brentford	A	3–3	5,450	Porter (3)
19	26 November 2005	Yeovil Town	A	2–0	5,852	Warne (2)
20	6 December 2005	Walsall	H	2–1	3,878	Warne, Porter
21	10 December 2005	Swindon Town	H	2–2	5,354	Liddell, Wellens
22	17 December 2005	Chesterfield	A	1–1	4,304	Warne
23	26 December 2005	Bradford City	H	2–1	6,982	Beckett, Butcher
24	31 December 2005	Hartlepool United	H	2–1	5,047	Beckett, Liddell
25	2 January 2006	Milton Keynes Dons	A	1–0	5,082	Beckett
26	7 January 2006	Southend United	H	0–0	5,662	
27	10 January 2006	Blackpool	A	0–1	5,977	
28	14 January 2006	Nottingham Forest	A	0–3	17,807	
29	21 January 2006	Gillingham	H	2–0	5,783	Beckett (2)
30	28 January 2006	Huddersfield Town	A	2–3	12,973	Beckett, Porter
31	4 February 2006	Port Vale	H	0–1	5,555	
32	11 February 2006	Bournemouth	A	0–0	5,453	
33	15 February 2006	Nottingham Forest	H	3–0	5,584	Beckett, Butcher, Wellens
34	18 February 2006	Walsall	A	2–0	5,816	Beckett, Warne
35	25 February 2006	Tranmere Rovers	H	1–0	5,281	Wellens
36	11 March 2006	Colchester United	H	1–0	5,822	Butcher
37	14 March 2006	Rotherham United	A	0–2	5,823	
38	18 March 2006	Bradford City	A	4–1	7,959	Butcher, Beckett (2), Warne
39	25 March 2006	Blackpool	H	3–1	6,480	Beckett (3 - 1 pen)
40	31 March 2006	Hartlepool United	A	1–1	5,259	Beckett pen
41	8 April 2006	Milton Keynes Dons	H	1–2	5,919	Beckett pen
42	15 April 2006	Barnsley	H	0–3	7,772	
43	17 April 2006	Bristol City	A	1–2	12,779	Beckett
44	22 April 2006	Swansea City	H	1–1	5,179	Beckett pen
45	29 April 2006	Doncaster Rovers	A	0–1	6,104	
46	6 May 2006	Scunthorpe United	H	1–1	5,544	Eyres

=== FA Cup ===
Round	Date	Opponent	Venue	Result	Attendance	Scorers
R1	6 November 2005	Chasetown	A	1–1	1,997	Eyres
R1 Replay	16 November 2005	Chasetown	H	4–0	7,235	Porter (2), Warne, Hall
R2	3 December 2005	Brentford	H	1–1	4,365	Liddell pen
R2 Replay	13 December 2005	Brentford	A	0–1	3,146	

=== League Cup ===
Round	Date	Opponent	Venue	Result	Attendance	Scorers
R1	23 August 2005	Leeds United	A	0–2	14,970	

=== Football League Trophy ===
Round	Date	Opponent	Venue	Result	Attendance	Scorers
R1	18 October 2005	Carlisle United	H	1–1 (5–6 pens)	2,226	Liddell pen

== Squad statistics ==
No.	Pos.	Name	League		FA Cup		League Cup		Other		Total	
No.	Pos.	Name	Apps	Goals	Apps	Goals	Apps	Goals	Apps	Goals	Apps	Goals
1	GK	(England) Lee Grant	16	0	0	0	0	0	0	0	16	0
1	GK	(Australia) Les Pogliacomi	0	0	0	0	0	0	0	0	0	0
2	DF	(England) Terrell Forbes	33(6)	0	3	0	1	0	1	0	38(6)	0
3	DF	(England) Adam Griffin	0	0	0	0	0	0	0	0	0	0
4	MF	(England) Mark Bonner	5(2)	1	0	0	0(1)	0	0	0	5(2)	1
4	DF	(England) Anthony Grant	2	0	0	0	0	0	0	0	2	0
5	DF	(Scotland) Will Haining	13(2)	0	1	0	0	0	0	0	14(2)	0
6	DF	(Netherlands) Stefan Stam	9(4)	0	0	0	0	0	0	0	9(4)	0
7	MF	(England) Richie Wellens	45	4	4	0	1	0	1	0	51	4
8	MF	(Northern Ireland) Mark Hughes	30(3)	1	4	0	1	0	1	0	36(3)	1
9	FW	(England) Luke Beckett	27(7)	18	1(2)	0	0	0	1	0	29(9)	18
10	FW	(England) Delroy Facey	0(3)	0	0	0	0(1)	0	0	0	0(4)	0
11	MF	(England) Paul Edwards	29(5)	0	2	0	0(1)	0	0	0	31(6)	0
12	FW	(New Zealand) Chris Killen	10(2)	2	0	0	0	0	0	0	10(2)	2
13	GK	(England) Chris Day	30	0	4	0	1	0	1	0	36	0
14	FW	(England) Paul Warne	38(2)	9	4	1	1	0	1	0	44(2)	10
15	DF	(England) Danny Hall	9(1)	0	2	0	0	0	1	0	12(1)	0
16	DF	(England) Rob Scott	19(2)	1	2(1)	0	1	0	1	0	23(3)	1
17	MF	(England) Richard Butcher	32(4)	4	3	0	0	0	0	0	35(4)	4
18	DF	(England) Guy Branston	38	1	2	0	1	0	0	0	41	1
19	DF	(England) Marc Tierney	13(6)	0	2(1)	0	0	0	0(1)	0	15(7)	1
20	DF	(Wales) Gareth Owen	17	0	2(1)	0	1	0	0	0	19(1)	0
21	FW	(England) Chris Porter	18(13)	7	3	2	0	0	0(1)	0	21(14)	9
22	FW	(England) Andy Liddell	29	9	4	1	1	0	1	1	35	10
23	DF	(England) Chris Swailes	14(1)	0	0	0	0	0	0	0	14(1)	0
25	GK	(England) Lance Cronin	0	0	0(1)	0	0	0	0	0	0(1)	0
28	MF	(England) David Eyres	15(6)	4	1(1)	1	0	0	1	0	17(6)	5
30	FW	(England) Chris Hall	3(14)	0	0(2)	1	0	0	0(1)	0	3(17)	1
31	FW	(England) Matthew Wolfenden	0(1)	0	0	0	0	0	0	0	0(1)	0
35	FW	(England) Chris Taylor	11(3)	0	0	0	0	0	0	0	11(3)	0
43	DF	(Wales) Neal Eardley	1	0	0	0	0	0	0	0	1	0
