= 2007–08 Oldham Athletic A.F.C. season =

Athletic season

Oldham Athletic
2007–08 season
- Chairman: Simon Blitz
- Manager: John Sheridan
- Stadium: Boundary Park
- Football League One: 8th
- League Cup: Second round
- FA Cup: Fourth round
- Football League Trophy: Second round
- Top goalscorer: League: Davies (10); All: Davies (14)
- Highest home attendance: 12,749 vs. Huddersfield Town
- Lowest home attendance: 3,155 vs. Mansfield Town
- Average home league attendance: 5,326
Home colours	Away colours

This article details Oldham Athletic A.F.C.'s season in League One during the 2007–08 season.

== Club ==
=== Players ===
As of 15 March 2008:

Note: Flags indicate national team as defined under FIFA eligibility rules; some limited exceptions apply. Players may hold more than one non-FIFA nationality.

No.	Pos.	Nation	Player
1	GK	(Wales) WAL	Mark Crossley
2	DF	(Wales) WAL	Neal Eardley
3	MF	(England) ENG	David Livermore (on loan from Hull City)
4	MF	(Democratic Republic of the Congo) COD	Jean-Paul Kalala
5	DF	(Republic of Ireland) IRL	John Thompson
6	DF	(Netherlands) NED	Stefan Stam
8	MF	(England) ENG	Mark Allott
9	FW	(England) ENG	Lee Hughes
10	FW	(Wales) WAL	Craig Davies
11	MF	(England) ENG	Jason Jarrett (on loan from Preston North End)
12	DF	(England) ENG	Kelvin Lomax
13	GK	(England) ENG	Richard O'Donnell (on loan from Sheffield Wednesday)
14	DF	(England) ENG	Reuben Hazell

No.	Pos.	Nation	Player
15	MF	(Scotland) SCO	Gary McDonald
16	DF	(England) ENG	Sean Gregan (captain)
17	FW	(England) ENG	Matthew Wolfenden
18	MF	(England) ENG	Chris Taylor
19	MF	(England) ENG	Mike Pearson
22	MF	(Scotland) SCO	Andy Liddell
24	FW	(England) ENG	Deane Smalley
25	FW	(England) ENG	Lewis Alessandra
26	MF	(England) ENG	Ashley Kelly
31	GK	(England) ENG	Josh Bell
32	DF	(England) ENG	Paul Black
42	MF	(England) ENG	Aaron Chalmers

=== Statistics leaders ===
Club Statistics | Oldham Athletic

Appearances	Neal Eardley	48
Scorer	Craig Davies	14
Assists	Chris Taylor	6
Shots	Craig Davies	128
Red Cards	Neal Trotman; Neal Eardley; Reuben Hazell	1
Yellow Cards	Neal Trotman	10
Fouls	Craig Davies	95

== Transfers ==
=== In ===
Date	Pos.	Name	From	Fee
10 July 2007	FW	Michael Ricketts	Preston North End	Free
14 September 2007	DF	Reuben Hazell	Chesterfield	Free
27 March 2008	FW	(Scotland) Robbie Winters	(Norway) SK Brann	?
22 April 2008	GK	Greg Fleming	(Scotland) Gretna	Free
22 April 2008	MF	Kieran Lee	Manchester United	Free
28 April 2008	FW	Chris O'Grady	Rotherham	?
5 June 2008	MF	Dale Stephens	Bury	?
20 June 2008	MF	Danny Whitaker	Port Vale	?

=== Out ===
Date	Pos.	Name	To	Fee
1 July 2007	FW	Danny Philliskirk	Chelsea	Free
16 July 2007	GK	Terry Smith	Southport	?
1 August 2007	MF	Paul Warne	Yeovil	Free
1 October 2007	FW	Neil Wood	Released	
4 January 2008	DF	Marcus Holness	Rochdale	Free
30 January 2008	DF	Neal Trotman	Preston North End	£500,000
April 2008	MF	Ashley Kelly	Released	
April 2008	FW	Mike Pearson	Released	

=== Loan in ===
Date	Pos.	Name	From
30 July 2007	MF	(Australia) Neil Kilkenny	Birmingham City
10 August 2007	DF	Stuart Giddings	Coventry City
21 August 2007	DF	Ryan Bertrand	Chelsea
18 October 2007	GK	Marlon Beresford	Luton Town
29 January 2008	MF	Jason Jarrett	Preston North End
31 January 2008	MF	David Livermore	Hull City
26 February 2008	FW	Jordan Robertson	Sheffield United
4 March 2008	FW	Leon Constantine	Leeds United
27 March 2008	GK	Richard O'Donnell	Sheffield Wednesday

=== Loan out ===
Date	Pos.	Name	To
13 September 2007	DF	Kelvin Lomax	Rochdale
1 October 2007	DF	Marcus Holness	Rochdale
9 October 2007	FW	Mike Pearson	Farsley
2 November 2007	FW	Michael Ricketts	Walsall
27 December 2007	MF	Ashley Kelly	Barrow

== League position ==
Pos	Team	Pld	W	D	L	GF	GA	GD	Pts	Promotion, qualification or relegation
6	Southend United	46	22	10	14	70	55	+15	76	Qualification for League One play-offs (Note: Four teams play for one spot and promotion to the Football League Championship.)
7	Brighton & Hove Albion	46	19	12	15	58	50	+8	69	
8	Oldham Athletic	46	18	13	15	58	45	+13	67	
9	Northampton Town	46	17	15	14	60	55	+5	66	
10	Huddersfield Town	46	20	6	20	50	62	−12	66	

Updated to match(es) played on 3 May 2008. Source: The Football League
Rules for classification: 1) points; 2) goal difference; 3) number of goals scored.

== Results ==
=== Legend ===
Win	Draw	Loss

=== League One ===
Date	Opponent	Venue	Result	Scorers
11 August 2007	Swansea City	H	2–1	Ricketts 3' (pen.), Davies 90'
18 August 2007	Carlisle	A	0–1	—
25 August 2007	Bristol Rovers	H	0–1	—
1 September 2007	Hartlepool	A	1–4	Davies 14'
15 September 2007	Southend United	H	0–1	—
22 September 2007	Walsall	A	3–0	Ricketts 33', Liddell 65' (pen.), Davies 90'
29 September 2007	Crewe Alexandra	H	3–2	Allott 36', Wolfenden 83', Kilkenny 90'
2 October 2007	Leeds United	H	0–1	—
6 October 2007	Cheltenham Town	A	1–1	Liddell 46'
20 October 2007	Huddersfield Town	A	1–1	Davies 27'
27 October 2007	Northampton Town	H	0–1	—
30 October 2007	Nottingham Forest	A	0–0	—
3 November 2007	Leyon Orient	A	0–1	—
6 November 2007	Tranmere Rovers	A	1–0	Davies 90'
17 November 2007	Port Vale	H	1–1	Davies 23'
24 November 2007	Bournemouth	A	3–0	Hughes (2) 56', 90' (pen.), Taylor 70'
4 December 2007	Luton Town	H	1–1	Davies 32'
8 December 2007	Doncaster Rovers	H	1–1	Allott 44'
15 December 2007	Millwall	A	3–2	Hughes (3) 32', 74' (pen.), 80'
22 December 2007	Southend United	A	1–0	Hughes 4'
26 December 2007	Nottingham Forest	H	0–0	—
29 December 2007	Walsall	H	0–2	—
1 January 2008	Leeds United	A	3–1	Hazell 28', Trotman 36', Davies 41'
12 January 2008	Brighton & Hove Albion	H	1–1	Hughes 40'
19 January 2008	Yeovil Town	A	0–0	—
22 January 2008	Gillingham	A	0–0	—
29 January 2008	Carlisle	H	2–0	McDonald (2) 21', 44'
2 February 2008	Swansea City	A	1–2	Davies 76' (pen.)
9 February 2008	Gillingham	H	2–1	Taylor 42', Davies 67'
12 February 2008	Bristol Rovers	A	0–1	—
16 February 2008	Yeovil Town	H	3–0	McDonald 15', Peltier 77' (og), Davies 87'
23 February 2008	Brighton & Hove Albion	A	0–1	—
26 February 2008	Swindon Town	H	2–2	Livermore 50', Allott 55'
1 March 2008	Port Vale	A	3–0	Robertson 23', Eardly 78', Wolfenden 90'
4 March 2008	Hartlepool	H	0–1	—
8 March 2008	Tranmere Rovers	H	3–1	Eardley 41' (pen.), Taylor 45', Alessandra 76'
11 March 2008	Bournemouth	H	2–0	Eardley (2) 24' (pen.), 80' (pen.)
15 March 2008	Luton Town	A	0–3	—
22 March 2008	Millwall	H	1–1	Constantine 79'
24 March 2008	Doncaster Rovers	A	1–1	Jarrett 52'
29 March 2008	Huddersfield Town	H	4–1	Jarrett (2) 8', 45', Constantine 40', Taylor 61'
5 April 2008	Swindon Town	A	0–3	—
12 April 2008	Leyton Orient	A	2–0	Taylor 22', Allott 42'
19 April 2008	Northampton Town	A	0–2	—
26 April 2008	Cheltenham Town	H	2–1	Smalley 16', Alessandra 87'
3 May 2008	Crewe Alexandra	A	4–1	Smalley 5', Eardley (2) 32', 59', McDonald 69'

=== FA Cup ===
Round	Date	Opponent	Venue	Result	Scorers	Ref.
First round	10 November 2007	Doncaster Rovers	H	2–2	Trotman 32', Davies 42'	
First round replay	27 November 2007	Doncaster Rovers	A	2–1	Kilkenny 45', McDonald 49'	
Second round	1 December 2007	Crewe Alexandra	H	1–0	Hughes 41'	
Third round	5 January 2008	Everton	A	1–0	McDonald 45'	
Fourth round	26 January 2008	Huddersfield Town	H	0–1	—	

=== League Cup ===
Round	Date	Opponent	Venue	Result	Scorers	Ref.
First round	14 August 2007	Mansfield Town	H	4–1	Kilkenny 20', Kalala 27', Smalley 82', Davies 86'	
Second round	28 August 2007	Burnley	A	0–3	—	

=== Football League Trophy ===
Round	Date	Opponent	Venue	Result	Scorers	Ref.
First round	4 September 2007	Accrington Stanley	A	3–2	Liddell 55', Davies 56', Wolfenden 73'	
Second round	23 October 2007	Doncaster Rovers	A	0–3	—	
