= Terry Smith =

Terry Smith may refer to:

== Entertainment ==
- Terry Smith (guitarist) (born 1943), British jazz guitarist
- Terry Smith (art historian) (born 1944), Australian art historian and critic
- Terry Smith (artist) (born 1956), English sculptor
- Terry Smith (dancer), with English troupe Diversity

== Sports ==
- Terry Smith (Australian footballer) (1959–2006), player with St Kilda and Richmond
- Terry Smith (footballer, born 1951), English football player for Stoke City
- Terry Smith (American football, born 1959), American pro football player, head coach, owner
- Terry Smith (American football, born 1969), American college football coach and player
- Terry Smith (basketball) (born 1986), American basketball player
- Terry Smith (footballer, born 1987), English football goalkeeper

== Other ==
- Terry Smith (politician) (born 1946), Australian politician
- Terry Smith (businessman) (born 1953), British fund manager
- Terry Smith (sportscaster) (fl. 2000s), radio

== See also ==
- Terence Smith (disambiguation)
- Smith (surname)
