= Maheta Molango =

Swiss footballer (born 1982)

Personal information
- Full name: Maheta Matteo Molango
- Date of birth: 24 July 1982 (age 44)
- Place of birth: Saint-Imier, Switzerland
- Height: 6 ft 1 in (1.85 m)
- Position: Forward

Team information
- Current team: Sampdoria (counselor)

Senior career*
Years	Team	Apps	(Gls)
2003–2004	Atlético Madrid		
	SV Wacker Burghausen	5	(0)
2004–2007	Brighton & Hove Albion	6	(1)
2005–2006	→ Lincoln City (loan)	10	(0)
2006	→ UB Conquense (loan)	8	(0)
2006	→ Oldham Athletic (loan)	5	(1)
2006	→ Wrexham (loan)	3	(0)
2007	Grays Athletic	2	(0)
- Conquense
2009–2010	Villanueva Pardillo		
2010–2015	Unión Adarve		
- * Club domestic league appearances and goals

Maheta Matteo Molango (born 24 July 1982) is a Swiss-born sports executive and former professional footballer. He was born in Saint-Imier, Switzerland, he is an Italian citizen, born to a Congolese father and Italian mother.

He became the Chief Executive of the Professional Footballers' Association for England and Wales on 1 June 2021, replacing Gordon Taylor.

== Career ==
Molango began his professional career at Atletico Madrid when he was aged 18, following a successful trial with the club he signed a two-year professional contract. Molango signed a three-year contract with Brighton & Hove Albion, after impressing then-manager Mark McGhee during a two-week trial for the club in the summer of 2004, shortly after being released by SV Wacker Burghausen in Germany. His career at Brighton got off to a quick start, scoring a goal just 12 seconds into his debut versus Reading at Madejski Stadium. Despite his early goal, Brighton fell 3–2. Shortly after, Molango had a falling out with McGhee and after six total appearances, would not make another appearance in the 2004–05 season.

In the summer of 2005, Brighton allowed Molango to pursue a move elsewhere. After a successful trial with Lincoln City, Keith Alexander signed Molango on 3 August on a season-long loan. He scored his first and only goal for Lincoln in a 5-1 League Cup victory over Crewe Alexandra on 23 August 2005. In December 2005, while still at Lincoln City, Brighton informed Molango that he did not have a future with the Seagulls. After being sent back to Brighton by Keith Alexander, he again went on loan, this time to UB Conquense for the remainder of the 2005–06 season. He debuted for the club in their 1-1 Segunda División B home draw with UD Almansa on 29 January 2006 and went on to make eight league appearances for the club without finding the net.

At the start of the 2006–07 season, Molango went on loan to League One side Oldham Athletic on a month's loan. On 12 August 2006, he scored his only goal for the Latics in a 1–0 win over Swansea City. After six appearances and one goal for the club, Oldham decided not to renew his loan.

After returning to Brighton, Molango was given another chance under manager Dean Wilkins after Jake Robinson fell to an illness. However, Brighton lost to Carlisle United 3–1. Molango failed to impress Wilkins in the loss, who loaned him out to Wrexham the following week on a one-month loan. At Wrexham, Molango earned four starts including one in the FA Cup. However, his loan again was unrenewed, effectively sending him back to Brighton. After failing to make any more first-team appearances, Brighton and Molango agreed to part ways several months before his three-year contract was set to expire.

The day after ending his career with Brighton, Molango signed with Conference National side Grays Athletic until the end of the 2006–07 season. However, after just two league appearances for the Essex club, he was released after just a month.

As a player, his last team was Unión Adarve in group one of the Preferente de Madrid.

Molango represented Congo Under-21s, making six appearances for the team.

== Legal career ==
Following his release from Grays Athletic, he returned to Spain, trialling with Albacete Balompié in March 2007, UD Las Palmas in July 2007 and Lucena CF in August 2007.

Having obtained a LL.B and B.A. Political Science from Charles III University of Madrid, he joined the employment law department of the Madrid office of Baker & McKenzie in April 2007. Molango is a specialist in employment and sports law and was part of the Baker McKenzie Advisory Board. In January 2008 he moved to the United States to study for the LL.M program in International Legal Studies at the American University Washington College of Law graduating in 2009 whilst also being the recipient of the college's Rubin Scholarship. Returning to Madrid and Baker & McKenzie, he played part-time football in the 2009–10 season for FC Villanueva del Pardillo in group one of the Preferente before moving on to join their divisional counterparts Unión Adarve for the 2010–2011 season. He passed the New York bar examination in 2011.

Molango was seconded to Atlético Madrid in 2015, where he served as legal counsel. In his time at Atlético Madrid he focused on contract and transfer negotiations and within two transfer windows helped oversee 30 deals, including the sale of Mario Mandžukić to Juventus, Filipe Luís’ return from Chelsea, Yannick Carrasco’s switch from Monaco and Antoine Griezmann’s new deal.

Fluent in English, Spanish, French, Italian and German, Maheta was twice named one of the best sports lawyers in Spain by international rankings company Chambers and Partners.

== RCD Mallorca ==
He was appointed the Chief Executive of RCD Mallorca in 2016 following the takeover by former NBA star Steve Nash and Phoenix Suns owner Robert Sarver. His four years at RCD Mallorca saw the club achieve back-to-back promotions from Segunda División B to La Liga.

== FIFA ==
Molango was appointed Director of FIFA’s Diploma in Club management programme, which commenced in March 2021. In the role, he helps train executives, with speakers ranging from Arsène Wenger to Fabio Cannavaro.

== Professional Footballers' Association ==
From 1 June 2021, Molango was appointed as the Chief Executive of the Professional Footballers' Association (PFA) for England and Wales.

PFA and Premier League Funding Agreement

In May 2023, the PFA and the Premier League announced a new five-year partnership.

The agreement saw an uplift in funding to help support the wide range of services the players’ union provides to its members across the professional game at all stages of their careers, including, enhanced focus on player welfare and support, community initiatives and coaching programmes to increase diversity in the workforce, greater support for Academy players, mental health support, education for careers after playing and medical research.

The five-year partnership is the longest agreement that has existed between the PFA and the Premier League.

Women's Football

The PFA outlined details of reforms to contracts in the women's game in February 2022. Following negotiations with The FA, the PFA achieved three significant policy changes relating to maternity provision, injury and illness and the termination of contracts due to long-term injury. The changes will apply to players in the Women's Super League (WSL) and the Women's Championship.

Molango spoke at the Trades Union Congress (TUC) in September 2023 where he highlighted the current lack of security around the contracts and conditions of female professionals. He also called for the immediate implementation of structures, which already exist in the men's game, to better protect players.

PFA Business School

In January 2022, Molango unveiled the PFA's ambitious initiative, the PFA Business School. The project, led by experts from the world of football, sport, and beyond, is designed to enable players to acquire new skills, discover their potential and unlock new career opportunities within the industry.

In September 2023, under Molango's leadership, the PFA Business School launched seven programmes covering areas including football business management, psychology and leadership, and data analytics, with courses taught by figures such as Gary Neville, Andoni Zubizarreta, Giorgio Furlani, Hope Powell and Steve Parish.

PFA Awards

In August 2023, Molango presided over a significant revamp of the PFA Awards, celebrating its 50th anniversary. This milestone event, hosted by Alex Scott and Jules Breach, introduced a fresh format and marked the first time the Awards were held outside of London, finding a new home at the Lowry Theatre in Salford. The winners on the night included Erling Haaland of Manchester City, Rachel Daly of Aston Villa, Bukayo Saka of Arsenal, and Lauren James of Chelsea. The star-studded affair attracted icons past and present from the world of football, including Reuben Dias, Martin Ødegaard, Bunny Shaw, Alan Shearer and Jill Scott.

Brain Health

In September 2021, Molango pledged to donate his brain as part of a concussion initiative which will research Chronic Traumatic Encephalopathy and other consequences of brain trauma in athletes.

It was announced in October 2021 that Molango and the PFA were calling on football stakeholders to establish an industry-wide care fund to support players living with dementia and other neurodegenerative conditions.

In February 2022, Molango, working closely with Dawn Astle, announced the creation of a dedicated Brain Health department focused on neurodegenerative diseases within football. It is the first of its kind in world football. The department is now led by Dr Adam White, a renowned research leader in sports, medicine and health.

In September 2023, it was announced that the PFA and the Premier League would launch a new Brain Health Fund. An initial £1 million has been made available to assist former players and their families who have been impacted by dementia and other neurodegenerative conditions.

== FIFPRO ==
In January 2023, Molango joined the Global and European Boards of FIFPRO, the Global Players’ Union. Molango joins an 18-person Board, which carries the responsibility of representing over 66,000 professional footballers from across Africa, Asia/Oceania, Central and North America, South America and Europe.

== Career statistics ==
Appearances and goals by club, season and competition
Club	Years	League			FA Cup		League Cup		Other		Total	
Club	Years	Division	Apps	Goals	Apps	Goals	Apps	Goals	Apps	Goals	Apps	Goals
Brighton & Hove Albion	2004–2005	Championship	5	1	0	0	1	0	—		6	1
Brighton & Hove Albion	2005–2006	Championship	0	0	0	0	0	0	—		0	0
Brighton & Hove Albion	2006–2007	League One	1	0	0	0	0	0	0	0	1	0
Brighton & Hove Albion	Total		6	1	0	0	1	0	0	0	7	1
Lincoln City (loan)	2005–2006	League Two	10	0	1	0	2	1	1 (Note: Appearance in Football League Trophy)	0	14	1
Oldham Athletic (loan)	2006–2007	League One	5	1	0	0	1	0	0	0	6	1
Wrexham (loan)	2006–2007	League Two	3	0	1	0	0	0	0	0	4	0
Grays Athletic	2006–2007	Conference National	2	0	0	0	—		2 (Note: Appearances in FA Trophy)	0	4	0
Total			26	2	2	0	4	1	3	0	35	3
