= Paul Edwards (footballer, born 1980) =

English footballer

Personal information
- Full name: Paul Edwards
- Date of birth: 1 January 1980 (age 46)
- Place of birth: Manchester, England
- Height: 5 ft 10 in (1.78 m)
- Positions: Left-back; winger

Youth career
- Manchester City
- Crewe Alexandra

Senior career*
Years	Team	Apps	(Gls)
1996–199?	Ashton United		
199?–199?	Curzon Ashton		
1998	Doncaster Rovers	9	(0)
1998–200?	Leigh Genesis		
2000–2001	Altrincham	9	(0)
2001–2002	Swindon Town	14	(0)
2002–2004	Wrexham	79	(4)
2004–2005	Blackpool	28	(3)
2005–2007	Oldham Athletic	60	(0)
2007–2009	Port Vale	56	(2)
2010–2011	Barrow	55	(0)
2011–2012	Fleetwood Town	7	(0)
2012	→ Mansfield Town (loan)	3	(0)
2012	→ Barrow (loan)	4	(0)
2013–2014	Barrow	21	(0)
Total		345	(9)
- * Club domestic league appearances and goals

Paul Edwards (born 1 January 1980) is an English former footballer. He made 246 league appearances in the English Football League.

Starting in non-League football, he played for Ashton United and Curzon Ashton before briefly appearing with League club Doncaster Rovers in 1997. Spells at Knutsford Town and Altrincham followed before he was picked up by Swindon Town in 1999. After three years, he moved on to Welsh club Wrexham before switching to Blackpool for the 2004–05 season. After two years with Oldham Athletic, he signed with Port Vale in summer 2007. After two years with Vale, he dropped into the Conference to play for Barrow. Having won the FA Trophy with the club in 2010, he switched clubs to Fleetwood Town the following year. He joined Mansfield Town on loan in January 2012, before joining Barrow on loan two months later. He spent a year out of the game before re-signing with Barrow in August 2013.

== Career ==
=== Early career ===
Born in Manchester, Edwards started his career with Crewe Alexandra, never making the first-team he dropped into non-League football with Ashton United, He went on to play for Curzon Ashton, before signing with Doncaster Rovers and making nine Third Division appearances during the second half of the 1997–98 season. He left Belle Vue as Danny Bergara's "Donny" were relegated in last place at the end of the campaign. He returned to non-League football with Leigh Genesis and then Altrincham, featuring in nine Northern Premier League Premier Division games for "Alty" during the 2000–01 season. He returned to the Football League with Second Division club Swindon Town for the start of the 2001–02 season following a successful trial spell. After the season finished he refused a new contract with Swindon and instead signed with Welsh club Wrexham in June 2002; Swindon received an appearance-based transfer fee from Wrexham. He spent two seasons at the Racecourse Ground before rejecting a new contract with the club, instead joining Blackpool. After 31 games for the "Seasiders" in the 2004–05 season he joined Oldham Athletic on a free transfer in May 2005.

=== Port Vale ===
Rejecting a new deal at Oldham, Edwards signed with Port Vale in June 2007. After not making much of an impression at Vale Park he was placed on the transfer list. After hearing about this, he gave an outburst in The Sentinel claiming he was the best player playing at Port Vale. Despite denying the remarks, he was booed onto the pitch the following game against AFC Bournemouth. Vale lost that game 3–1 but the game after that against Yeovil Town saw Edwards answer his critics as he scored in a 2–2 draw.

During the build-up to the 2008–09, Edwards suffered an ankle injury in pre-season that threatened to cut short his Port Vale career. However, after overcoming this, he soon returned to the bench after superb performances in the reserves. He came on during Vale's 2–1 home defeat to Notts County and was arguably the best player with his trickery and pace on the left of midfield. He found himself back in the first team the following week and gave a man of the match performance against Shrewsbury Town on 11 October 2008 at the New Meadow, which Vale won 2–1. Following the conclusion of the season he was offered a new contract, but after the appointment of new manager Micky Adams the offer was withdrawn.

=== Barrow ===
It had been suggested that he would link up again with John Sheridan, his manager at Oldham, now at Chesterfield. But this came to nothing and after a brief trial with his former club Wrexham in late 2009, he signed for Barrow in March 2010, and ironically made his debut against Wrexham later in the month. Two months he lifted his first trophy with the club after a 2–1 win over Stevenage Borough in the FA Trophy final at Wembley Stadium. At the end of the season the club released left-back Gareth Jelleyman, with the intention that Edwards would fulfil this role the following season. However, the club soon discovered that Edwards had also been offered a trial with Inverness Caledonian Thistle. Edwards failed to gain a contract in Scotland however and returned to Barrow just after the start of the 2010–11 season. In May 2011 he was offered a new contract by Barrow, having made a 43-game haul in the 2010–11 campaign.

=== Fleetwood Town and return to Barrow ===
In June 2011, he signed with Barrow's Conference rivals Fleetwood Town. In January 2012 he joined Conference rivals Mansfield Town on a one-month loan, after manager Paul Cox had previously attempted to sign Edwards in the summer. He played three games for the "Stags", before returning to Highbury. In March 2012, he re-joined former club Barrow on loan until 28 April. He was released by Fleetwood in May 2012. After a year out of the game, he returned to Barrow again, this time in the Conference North. He played 25 games for the "Bluebirds" during the 2013–14 season, helping Darren Edmondson's side to an 11th-place finish.

== Personal life ==
Edwards has a son, Devonte Redmond, who plays for Gulf United as a midfielder.

== Career statistics ==
Appearances and goals by club, season and competition
Club	Season	League			FA Cup		League Cup		Other		Total	
Club	Season	Division	Apps	Goals	Apps	Goals	Apps	Goals	Apps	Goals	Apps	Goals
Doncaster Rovers	1997–98	Third Division	9	0	0	0	0	0	0	0	9	0
Altrincham	2000–01	Northern Premier League; Premier Division	9	0	0	0	—		0	0	9	0
Swindon Town	2001–02	Second Division	14	0	1	1	0	0	1 (Note: Appearance(s) in the EFL Trophy.)	0	16	1
Wrexham	2002–03	Third Division	38	4	1	0	2	0	2	0	43	4
Wrexham	2003–04	Second Division	41	0	0	0	1	0	1	0	43	0
Wrexham	Total		79	4	1	0	3	0	3	0	86	4
Blackpool	2004–05	League One	28	3	1	0	0	0	2	0	31	3
Oldham Athletic	2005–06	League One	34	0	2	0	1	0	0	0	37	0
Oldham Athletic	2006–07	League One	26	0	3	0	1	0	2 (Note: Appearance(s) in the play-offs.)	0	32	0
Oldham Athletic	Total		60	0	5	0	2	0	2	0	69	0
Port Vale	2007–08	League One	25	2	2	0	1	0	1	0	29	2
Port Vale	2008–09	League Two	31	0	2	0	0	0	0	0	33	0
Port Vale	Total		56	2	4	0	1	0	1	0	62	2
Barrow	2009–10	Conference National	12	0	0	0	—		0	0	12	0
Barrow	2010–11	Conference National	43	0	0	0	—		1 (Note: Appearance(s) in the FA Trophy.)	0	44	0
Barrow	Total		55	0	0	0	0	0	1	0	56	0
Fleetwood Town	2011–12	Conference National	7	0	0	0	—		1	0	8	0
Mansfield Town (loan)	2011–12	Conference National	3	0	0	0	—		0	0	3	0
Barrow (loan)	2011–12	Conference National	4	0	0	0	—		0	0	4	0
Barrow	2013–14	Conference North	21	0	2	0	—		2	0	25	0
Career total (Note: Statistics between 1998 and 2001 not recorded.)			345	9	14	1	6	0	13	0	378	10

== Honours ==
Barrow

- FA Trophy: 2010
