= Neal Eardley =

Welsh professional footballer

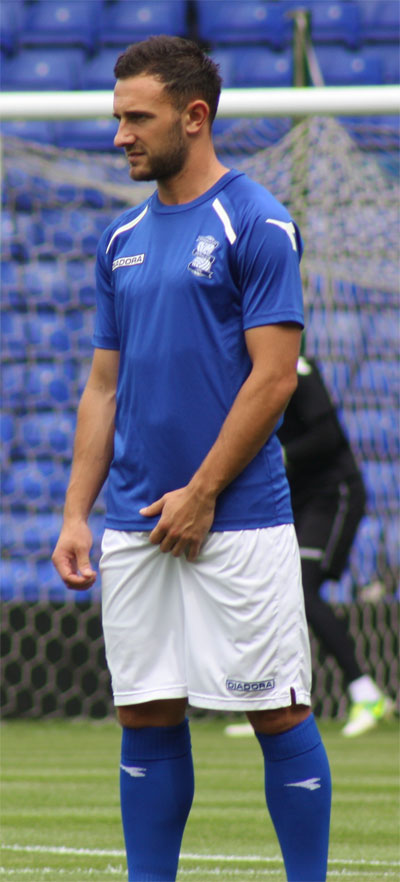
- With Birmingham City in 2013 pre-season

Personal information
- Full name: Neal James Eardley
- Date of birth: 6 November 1988 (age 38)
- Place of birth: Llandudno, Wales
- Height: 5 ft 11 in (1.80 m)
- Position: Right back

Team information
- Current team: Blackpool (U-18s coach)

Youth career
- Oldham Athletic

Senior career*
Years	Team	Apps	(Gls)
2006–2009	Oldham Athletic	113	(10)
2009–2013	Blackpool	104	(2)
2013–2016	Birmingham City	14	(0)
2015–2016	→ Leyton Orient (loan)	1	(0)
2016–2017	Hibernian	2	(0)
2017	Northampton Town	10	(0)
2017–2020	Lincoln City	122	(3)
2020–2021	Burton Albion	10	(0)
2021	→ Barrow (loan)	19	(0)
2021–2022	Connah's Quay Nomads	19	(1)
Total		414	(16)

International career
2003–2004	Wales U17	3	(0)
2005	Wales U19	1	(0)
2006–2010	Wales U21	10	(1)
2007–2011	Wales	16	(0)
- * Club domestic league appearances and goals

Neal James Eardley (born 6 November 1988) is a Welsh former international footballer who last played for Cymru Premier champions Connah's Quay Nomads. He represented Wales at under-17, under-19 and under-21 levels, before winning the first of his 16 senior caps in August 2007. Eardley is now a coach for former club Blackpool.

He began his career at Oldham Athletic, and made his first team debut in May 2006. He turned professional four months later and quickly became a regular first team player before he was named in the 2008–09 League One PFA Team of the Year. He was signed by Blackpool in August 2009 for a reported fee of £350,000. Blackpool were promoted out of the Championship via the play-offs in 2010, and he played 31 Premier League matches in their 2010–11 relegation campaign. He spent a further two seasons at Blackpool, before he moved on to Birmingham City in July 2013. He struggled with injuries throughout his three-year stay at Birmingham, playing just 21 matches, as well as one appearance on loan at Leyton Orient in January 2015. He joined Scottish club Hibernian on a short-term deal in September 2016, and then returned to England to play for Northampton Town in January 2017. He signed a short-term contract with Lincoln City in August 2017. On 4 August 2020, Eardley signed for League One Burton Albion. He was released at the end of the 2020–21 season.

== Club career ==
=== Oldham Athletic ===
Born in Llandudno, Eardley graduated from the youth system at Oldham Athletic to make his first team debut under Ronnie Moore in a 1–1 draw with Scunthorpe United at Boundary Park on 6 May 2006. In the 2006–07 season, Eardley became a regular starter under new manager John Sheridan, initially starting in a more attacking role before being shifted to defence. However, his season got off to a rough start, when he was sent off in the opening game on 5 August shortly after teammate Chris Taylor was also red carded, as Oldham lost 1–0 to Tranmere Rovers. In September he was given his first professional contract, which was due to run until June 2009. He scored his first goal with a free kick in a 2–1 loss at Chesterfield on 9 December. In his first season as a regular starter, Eardley made 41 appearances, scoring twice, as the "Latics" qualified for the League One play-offs, but were beaten by Blackpool at the semi-final stage.

The following season Eardley cemented his place as an integral member of the Oldham defence and was named captain during Sean Gregan's absence. He signed a one-year extension to his contract in October, extending it until 2010. On 11 March, he scored a brace from penalty kicks in a 2–0 win over AFC Bournemouth. Almost two months later, he again scored a brace in a 4–1 victory over Crewe Alexandra. In total, he made 49 appearances and scored six goals as Oldham posted an eighth-place finish.

Eardley earned praise from manager Joe Royle in April 2009, but despite missing matches through international call-ups was named in the League One Team of the Year for his performances across his 34 league appearances during the 2008–09 campaign, alongside teammate Chris Taylor. However Royle left the club and his successor, Dave Penney, signed cover at right-back in apparent anticipation at losing Eardley during the transfer window.

=== Blackpool ===
Blackpool manager, Ian Holloway signed Eardley on 7 August 2009 for an undisclosed fee – reported to be about £350,000; Eardley signed a two-year contract, with an option for a further 12 months. On 18 August, Eardley made his debut for the "Seasiders" in a 0–0 draw with Derby County at Bloomfield Road. He and teammate Charlie Adam were named in the Championship Team of the Week following their performance in the 3–2 home victory over Watford on 23 January 2010. However he was disciplined by Holloway the following month, along with Barry Bannan and Ishmel Demontagnac, when they were seen out at a nightclub in Blackpool following a home defeat to Leicester City, even though Eardley had a knee problem and was due to undergo treatment the next day. Holloway explained: "I'm disappointed – we'll have a party once we've got 52 points". All three were dropped from the squad for the next game, away to Sheffield Wednesday. The 2009–10 season ended on a high note though as Blackpool far exceeded their 52 points target to instead qualify for the play-offs with 70 points; they went on to beat Cardiff City 3–2 in the play-off final at Wembley Stadium, though Eardley was not in the matchday squad.

Eardley scored his first goal for the Tangerines with a free kick in a 2–2 draw with Everton in the Premier League at Bloomfield Road on 6 November 2010 – the day of his 21st birthday. He was subsequently named in the Premier League Team of the Week, alongside teammate and fellow goalscorer David Vaughan. He played 33 games across the 2010–11 campaign, but could not prevent Blackpool from being relegated with a 4–2 defeat to champions Manchester United at Old Trafford on 22 May.

After Blackpool's relegation from the Premier League, Eardley's pay was cut by 50%: Holloway suggested he was "so messed up by the whole thing" that he would be left out of the squad for the opening game of the 2011–12 season. For the following game, a League Cup first-round tie at Sheffield Wednesday, Eardley, playing in central midfield, captained a weakened side and missed a penalty. He made his first appearance in the league on 20 August; within two minutes of coming on as a second-half substitute with Blackpool 2–0 down to Brighton & Hove Albion; he set up a goal for Kevin Phillips and went on to produce a "brilliant display" that "helped Pool grab the unlikeliest of draws". He signed a new one-year contract with the club on 26 August, but injuries disrupted his first-team appearances in the early part of the season. He scored a "25-yard screamer into the top corner" in a 2–2 draw with Birmingham City on 26 November which he dedicated to Wales international manager Gary Speed, who died the next day. Eardley started at right-back in the play-off final defeat against West Ham United, taking his appearance total to 33 for the season. The club took up their option of a further year on his contract to keep him at Bloomfield Road for another season.

In September 2012, Holloway suggested that Eardley had matured over the previous year, during which his first child, a girl, had been born. He remained a first-team regular until Michael Appleton replaced Holloway as manager, but played less frequently thereafter, and appeared even less under Paul Ince as he ended the 2012–13 campaign with just 26 appearances to his name. Although disappointed by his lack of opportunity – "there has been a lot chopping and changing within the club and sometimes that happens" – he felt he had learnt from the experience and was settled at the club and in the area.

=== Birmingham City ===
In May 2013, Eardley agreed a three-year deal with Birmingham City, to begin on 1 July after his contract with Blackpool expired. He started the first seven games of the 2013–14 season, and was described as "fast emerging as a key player in Birmingham City's new-look system" playing at wing-back under manager Lee Clark. Half an hour into the match against Ipswich Town on 31 August he suffered a knee injury, later diagnosed as a ruptured medial ligament and a partial tear to the anterior cruciate ligament, which kept him out of action for the rest of the season. He returned to the starting eleven for the defeat at Middlesbrough on the opening day of the 2014–15 season, but was unable to establish himself in the first team, and was not used in the Championship again following his red card during a 1–0 defeat at Blackburn Rovers on 21 October. In January 2015, he joined League One club Leyton Orient on loan for a month. However, the loan spell was ended prematurely on 9 February after just one appearance.

Eardley finally returned to Birmingham's first team for the League Cup win at Bristol Rovers in August 2015. He was unable to dislodge Paul Caddis from the Championship starting eleven until 18 September, but after 44 minutes of the visit to Ipswich Town, he dislocated a shoulder. He made his next first-team appearance on 5 December, in a 2–0 defeat to Huddersfield Town at St Andrew's, started the next four matches, then missed a few weeks with a minor groin problem. Returning on 9 January 2016 for the FA Cup-tie with Bournemouth, he lasted until half-time, and was carried off the field with cruciate ligament damage. He was released by Birmingham when his contract expired at the end of the season.

"Every time he seems to get an innocuous bang in a game you almost fear the worst, he seems to be the unluckiest player going.".

— Birmingham manager Gary Rowett said that he was "heartbroken" at the way injuries had wrecked Eardley's time at St Andrew's.

=== Hibernian ===
On 28 September 2016, Eardley signed for Scottish Championship club Hibernian on a short-term deal, due to run until January 2017. He had impressed Hibs manager Neil Lennon on trial, winning a contract ahead of Poland international Filip Modelski. However he was unable to dislodge captain David Gray and left Easter Road shortly before his contract was due to expire, having made only two substitute appearances for the side.

=== Northampton Town ===
On 12 January 2017, Eardley signed for English League One side Northampton Town until the end of the 2016–17 season. He had originally been signed by Rob Page, who was sacked before Eardley's international clearance came through, leaving Paul Wilkinson as caretaker-manager. He had a bright start to his Cobblers career and established himself in the first team under new manager Justin Edinburgh. However he featured in only one further match following a 2–1 defeat to former club Oldham at Sixfields on 28 February, and was released in May 2017.

=== Lincoln City ===
After a trial at Port Vale in July 2017, Eardley joined Lincoln City, newly promoted to League Two, on a short-term contract until January 2018. According to manager Danny Cowley, "Technically and tactically you can see he's played in the Premier League and will be a good role model. He's one of those that makes everyone around him 5% better." Eardley went straight into the starting eleven for the opening fixture of the 2017–18 season, a 2–2 draw away to Wycombe Wanderers. He later extended his deal until the end of the season, and after he was voted Player of the Season he then re-signed until 2020. On 28 May 2020, it was announced Eardley will leave the club at the end of his current contract.

=== Burton Albion ===
Eardley joined Burton Albion on 4 August 2020 on a one-year deal.

On 14 January 2021, he moved on loan to Barrow.

On 12 May 2021 it was announced that he would be one of 12 players leaving Burton at the end of the season.

=== Connah's Quay Nomads ===
In October 2021 he moved into the Cymru Premier joining Connah's Quay Nomads.

== International career ==
=== Youth level ===
Eardley made three appearances for Wales at under–17 level in 2003 and 2004. In 2005, he played once for the Welsh under–19s before making his debut with the under-21 side in 2007. In March 2009, Eardley played in Wales under–21s' opening two games in qualifying for the 2011 European Championships, both against Luxembourg under–21s. The first game, on 27 March, was a 0–0 draw at Deich, Ettelbruck, then four days later he scored the first goal, from a penalty kick, in a 5–1 win at Parc y Scarlets, Llanelli. He started Wales under-21s' 2–1 win against Italy, also a Euro 2011 qualifier, which was their first ever victory over Italy at under-21 level.

=== Senior level ===
Eardley earned his first senior cap for Wales under John Toshack in a 1–0 win over Bulgaria on 22 August 2007, coming on as a substitute in the 46th minute. He also played twice in Wales' unsuccessful Euro 2008 qualifying campaign, in a 2–1 win over San Marino on 17 October 2007 and a 2–2 draw with Republic of Ireland on 17 November. On 6 June 2009, Eardley made his first appearance in a World Cup match, as Wales beat Azerbaijan 1–0 in their 2010 qualifier at the Tofik Bakhramov Stadium in Baku. He failed to win a cap following Chris Coleman's appointment as manager in January 2012; he had been called up by Coleman in 2013 but was forced to pull out due to the first of one of the numerous injuries that afflicted him during his time at Birmingham.

== Style of play ==
Speaking in December 2007, Eardley told FourFourTwo magazine that he felt his strength was his attacking ability, though he needed to improve on his heading skills.

== Personal life ==
He played alongside his brother at Oldham Athletic, who went on to coach at hometown club Llandudno.

== Career statistics ==
=== Club ===
Appearances and goals by club, season and competition
Club	Season	League			National cup (Note: Includes FA Cup, Welsh Cup)		League cup (Note: Includes Football League Cup / EFL Cup, Welsh League Cup)		Other		Total	
Club	Season	Division	Apps	Goals	Apps	Goals	Apps	Goals	Apps	Goals	Apps	Goals
Oldham Athletic	2005–06	League One	1	0	0	0	0	0	0	0	1	0
Oldham Athletic	2006–07	League One	36	2	3	0	1	0	1 (Note: Appearances in Football League play-offs)	0	41	2
Oldham Athletic	2007–08	League One	42	6	5	0	2	0	1 (Note: Appearances in Football League Trophy)	0	50	6
Oldham Athletic	2008–09	League One	34	2	0	0	2	0	1	0	37	2
Oldham Athletic	Total		113	10	8	0	5	0	3	0	129	10
Blackpool	2009–10	Championship	24	0	1	0	2	0	—		27	0
Blackpool	2010–11	Premier League	31	1	1	0	1	0	—		33	1
Blackpool	2011–12	Championship	26	1	3	0	1	0	3	0	33	1
Blackpool	2012–13	Championship	23	0	2	0	1	0	0	0	26	0
Blackpool	Total		104	2	7	0	5	0	3	0	119	2
Birmingham City	2013–14	Championship	5	0	0	0	2	0	—		7	0
Birmingham City	2014–15	Championship	4	0	1	0	1	0	—		6	0
Birmingham City	2015–16	Championship	5	0	1	0	2	0	—		8	0
Birmingham City	Total		14	0	2	0	5	0	0	0	21	0
Leyton Orient (loan)	2014–15	League One	1	0	—		—		—		1	0
Hibernian	2016–17	Scottish Championship	2	0	—		—		0	0	2	0
Northampton Town	2016–17	League One	10	0	—		—		—		10	0
Lincoln City	2017–18	League Two	44	1	1	0	1	0	8 (Note: Six appearances in EFL Trophy, two in Football League play-offs)	0	54	1
Lincoln City	2018–19	League Two	43	2	2	0	1	0	1 (Note: Appearance in EFL Trophy)	0	47	2
Lincoln City	2019–20	League One	35	0	2	0	2	0	0	0	39	0
Lincoln City	Total		122	3	5	0	4	0	9	0	140	3
Burton Albion	2020–21	League One	10	0	1	0	1	0	2	0	14	0
Barrow (loan)	2020–21	League Two	19	0	—		—		—		19	0
Connah's Quay Nomads	2021–22	Cymru Premier	19	1	2	0	1	0	—		22	1
Career total			414	16	25	0	21	0	17	0	477	16

=== International ===
Wales national team
Year	Apps	Goals
2007	3	0
2008	6	0
2009	4	0
2010	1	0
2011	2	0
Total	16	0

== Honours ==
Lincoln City

- EFL League Two: 2018–19
- EFL Trophy: 2017–18

Individual

- PFA Team of the Year: 2008–09 League One, 2018–19 League Two
