= Terence Smith =

Terence Smith may refer to:

- Terence Smith (journalist) (born 1938), American journalist
- Terence Smith (sailor) (1932–2021), British sailor
- Terence Smith (soccer) (born 1991), Canadian soccer player
- T. M. F. Smith (Terence Michael Frederick Smith), British statistician

== See also ==
- Terry Smith (disambiguation)
