= Richie Wellens =

English football manager & player (born 1980)

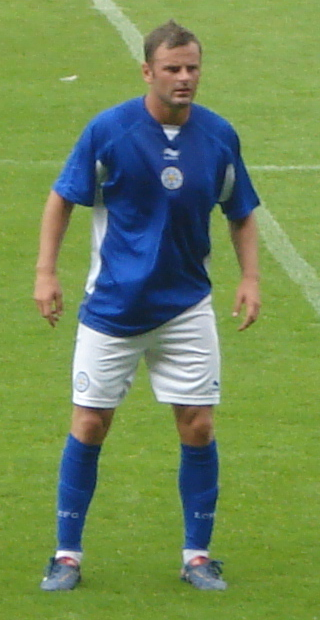
- Wellens playing for Leicester City in 2010

Personal information
- Full name: Richard Paul Wellens
- Date of birth: 26 March 1980 (age 46)
- Place of birth: Manchester, England
- Height: 5 ft 9 in (1.75 m)
- Position: Midfielder

Team information
- Current team: Leyton Orient (head coach)

Youth career
- 1997–1999: Manchester United

Senior career*
Years	Team	Apps	(Gls)
1999–2000	Manchester United	0	(0)
2000–2005	Blackpool	191	(16)
2005–2007	Oldham Athletic	87	(8)
2007–2009	Doncaster Rovers	84	(9)
2009–2013	Leicester City	129	(4)
2012	→ Ipswich Town (loan)	7	(0)
2013–2016	Doncaster Rovers	88	(3)
2015–2016	→ Oldham Athletic (loan)	3	(0)
2016	Shrewsbury Town	12	(0)
2016	Salford City	6	(1)
2016–2017	Macclesfield Town	2	(0)
Total		609	(41)

Managerial career
- 2017–2018: Oldham Athletic
- 2018–2020: Swindon Town
- 2020–2021: Salford City
- 2021: Doncaster Rovers
- 2022–: Leyton Orient
- * Club domestic league appearances and goals

Richard Paul Wellens (born 26 March 1980) is an English professional football manager and former player who played as a midfielder. He is currently head coach of EFL League One club Leyton Orient.

Wellens began his career at Manchester United before signing for Blackpool in 2000, where he went on to win promotion from League Two via the playoffs in 2001. In 2005, he left to join Oldham Athletic, where he made 87 appearances in two seasons at the club, before moving to Doncaster in 2007, becoming an instant fans' favourite by helping get the club promoted to the Championship for the first time in 50 years. After helping the club stay in the division, he moved to Leicester City, and during his time he won the club's Player of the Year in 2011. After a short loan spell with Ipswich Town, Wellens rejoined Doncaster in 2013, where he spent a further three years. Towards the end of his career, he had a short return to Oldham, before playing for Shrewsbury Town, and non-league clubs Salford City and Macclesfield Town, his final club before retiring in 2017.

Wellens' first role in management came when he returned to Oldham as first team manager from September 2017 to June 2018, when he was sacked following the club's relegation to League Two. Wellens then took over the vacant managerial position at Swindon Town in the summer of 2018, eventually leading the club to the 2019–20 League Two title on PPG during the COVID-19 pandemic. He left Swindon to manage League Two team Salford City in November 2020, but lasted less than six months in charge before being dismissed, having won the rearranged 2019–20 EFL Trophy. In May 2021 Wellens became manager of Doncaster.

== Club career ==
=== Manchester United ===
Born in Manchester, Wellens started his career at Manchester United, playing alongside the likes of Wes Brown and John O'Shea. His only first team appearance for the club was as a substitute in a 3–0 League Cup defeat to Aston Villa on 13 October 1999.

=== Blackpool ===
Frustrated at the lack of opportunities at Manchester United, he moved to Blackpool in March 2000. Wellens became an instant first team regular at the club and before long he was a fan's favourite. While at the club he helped them win promotion via winning the 2001 Football League Third Division play-off final which he played in at the Millennium Stadium. He would return to win at the Cardiff stadium two more times with Blackpool, both with the Football League Trophy; first in 2002 after scoring a crucial opening goal against Huddersfield Town in the first leg of the North Area Final, and again in 2004, the same season he was placed in the 2003–04 Football League Second Division PFA Team of the Year. He made 226 appearances with Blackpool before his move in 2005 to Oldham Athletic.

=== Oldham Athletic ===
In 2005, he left Blackpool for his local side Oldham Athletic, with Scott Vernon going the other way. This was done to bypass the 50% sell-on clause that Manchester United had added during Wellens' transfer to the Seasiders. In summer 2007, after turning down an improved contract offered by Oldham, he signed a two-year contract with fellow League One side Doncaster Rovers. Wellens made the 2004–05, 2006–07 and 2007–08 League One PFA Team of the Year. Overall, he made 101 appearances and scored 8 times for Oldham. Wellens alleged in an interview with The Deck (LSM Publishing) that he was not paid during the final six months of his time at the club, stating: "I think by the time I was sacked by Oldham, I hadn't been paid for six months. I ended up getting it [payment] but I said I'll wait and make sure you pay the players that are due it. It was difficult but I do look back on it and it was a massive learning curve."

=== Doncaster Rovers ===
Wellens was a member of the Doncaster side that gained promotion to the Championship in 2007–08. His midfield performances brought him several individual awards, several key goals and helped the team gain promotion. His first competitive goal for Doncaster was in August 2007 in the Football League Cup with the second strike in a 4–1 victory over Lincoln City. Wellens made 97 appearances, scoring 10 times, during his spell with Doncaster prior to his £1 million move to Leicester City.

=== Leicester City ===
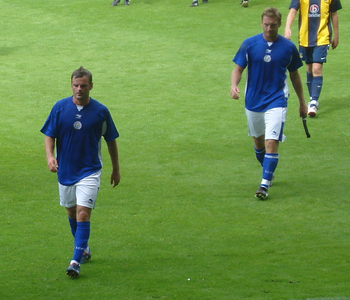
Wellens and Steve Howard playing for Leicester City in June 2010

On 7 July 2009, Wellens joined Leicester City for a potential fee of £1.2 million, signing a three-year contract. Their biggest signing of the summer, Wellens was named by the BBC Sport as the club's key player for the 2009–10 season. He made his debut in a 2–1 win over Swansea City on 8 August 2009, scoring his first goal in a 2–0 win over Middlesbrough on 2 May 2010. Wellens featured in all but three matches for Leicester in the Championship that season. He played a crucial role in Nigel Pearson's team that reached the play-offs semi-finals, where they lost to Cardiff City on penalties.

In his second season at the club, Wellens continued to play in midfield under the reign of both Paulo Sousa and Sven-Göran Eriksson. He was named Championship Player of the Month for January, and won the club's player of the year award on 3 May 2011.

During the 2011–12 season, Wellens ended the season, back under the returning Nigel Pearson, with 46 appearances in all competitions and captaining the side 19 times, but his season ended early when he suffered a cruciate knee ligament injury, ruling him out of action for six months. On 4 October, Wellens joined Ipswich Town a one-month loan deal, and returned to Leicester after an "impressive" seven game spell.

On 23 July 2013, Wellens left Leicester City by mutual consent, having played a total of 149 games and scoring 6 goals over his four seasons with them.

=== Return to Doncaster Rovers ===
On 2 August, Wellens signed a short-term contract with former club Doncaster Rovers. Having started five of Doncaster's first six games, Wellens extended his contract until January 2014.

At the end of the season, he expected to leave the club following a collapsed takeover of the club, but signed a new two-year deal at the beginning of September. He later said that it was a mistake rejoining the club, stating: "I think I was a little bit naive going in there in the first place. My head was telling me no but my heart was telling me yes"

=== Shrewsbury Town ===
Wellens joined Shrewsbury Town on a free transfer in January 2016, signing an 18-month contract. Having helped Shrewsbury to safety in League One, making twelve appearances in the second half of the 2015–16 season, he was made available on a free transfer less than five months later with manager Micky Mellon unable to guarantee him first-team football. He left in August after having game time limited.

=== Salford City ===
In September 2016, Wellens signed for National League North side Salford City. He left the club in October.

=== Macclesfield Town ===
Wellens signed for National League team Macclesfield Town in November.

== Managerial career ==
=== Oldham Athletic ===
On 4 July 2017, Wellens returned to Oldham Athletic as a first-team coach. Following the departure of John Sheridan on 25 September, Wellens was put in charge of Oldham Athletic on an caretaker basis, with his first game in charge being a 3–2 win against Peterborough United. Wellens said he was ready to be a manager, and hoped he and the club could adopt an approach for long-term success. After a five-match unbeaten run, he was appointed manager on a permanent basis on 18 October 2017 on a two-year contract, following a recommendation from Paul Scholes. He was dismissed on 8 June 2018 after Oldham's relegation to League Two. Wellens said it was "the right time" to part ways, and stated he had made mistakes that he hoped to learn from for a future managerial role.

=== Swindon Town ===
On 13 November 2018, Wellens was appointed manager of League Two side Swindon Town following the sacking of Phil Brown. His first game in charge was a 4–0 home defeat to Carlisle United, described as "the worst possible start". Wellens secured his first win as manager a week later, with a goal from Elijah Adebayo giving his side a 1–0 away win to Port Vale, and his first home victory came three days later, when academy graduate Sol Pryce scored twice on his league début to help Swindon win 3–2 against Stevenage. Wellens would guide Swindon to a 13th-place finish, ending the season with a 3–1 comeback victory against Notts County, who were relegated out of the Football League for the first time in their 157-year history as a result.

In the 2019–20 season, Wellens won the League Two title with Swindon Town on PPG during the global COVID-19 pandemic after the season was called off in March.

=== Salford City ===
On 4 November 2020, Wellens was appointed as the new manager of his former club Salford City, now playing in League Two. The first game of Wellens' reign came on 7 November, with a 2–0 win against Hartlepool in the FA Cup first round at Moor Lane, courtesy of goals from Bruno Andrade and Emmanuel Dieseruvwe in extra-time. Wellens suffered his first loss as Salford manager in his first league game in charge, a 2–0 loss against Bolton Wanderers the following week. His first league win came on 21 November against Bradford City, a 3–0 league victory with two goals from Luke Burgess and another from Ian Henderson. On 13 March 2021, Wellens guided Salford to victory in the delayed 2020 EFL Trophy Final, with a 4–2 penalty shootout victory after a 0–0 draw with Portsmouth. On 22 March 2021, it was announced that he and the club had parted company by mutual consent.

=== Doncaster Rovers ===
On 17 May 2021, Wellens was appointed manager of League One club Doncaster Rovers. On 2 December 2021, Wellens was dismissed by Doncaster with the club sitting 23rd in the table.

=== Leyton Orient ===
On 9 March 2022, Wellens was appointed head coach of the East London League Two club Leyton Orient on a two-and-a-half-year deal. At the time of his appointment, Orient were sitting in 20th position, four points clear of safety with eleven matches remaining.

An unbeaten start to the 2022–23 season saw Wellens win the EFL League Two Manager of the Month award for August 2022, his side sitting top of the league with the most goals scored and fewest conceded. A 100% record across September saw Wellens win the award for the second consecutive month. Wellens steered the club to promotion at the top of EFL League Two, which it achieved on 18 April 2023.

Having guided the club to ten points from four matches, including successive wins over the top two, Wellens was awarded the EFL League One Manager of the Month award for January 2024. At the end of the 2023–24 season, Wellens signed a new three-year contract with the club after guiding the club to an 11th place finish in League One.

Following a stellar run of form to end the calendar year, Wellens was awarded Manager of the Month for a second time for December 2024 having led his team to sixteen points from six matches without conceding a goal. With the good form continuing into the new year, he received the award for a second consecutive month after thirteen points from five matches.

== Approach and philosophy ==
Wellens favours his teams to play attacking football, believing long ball and defensive minded football to not be suitable to long-term success. He cites former Manchester United manager Alex Ferguson as a major influence on his approach. Using a preferred formation of 4-2-3-1, Wellens likes his teams to play out from the back and be patient, Wellens likes his player to maintain a high level of intensity, even during training sessions.

== Personal life ==
His sons Charlie Wellens & Alfie Wellens are both footballers who are currently contracted to Leyton Orient.

== Career statistics ==
Appearances and goals by club, season and competition
Club	Season	League			FA Cup		League Cup		Other		Total	
Club	Season	Division	Apps	Goals	Apps	Goals	Apps	Goals	Apps	Goals	Apps	Goals
Manchester United	1999–2000	Premier League	0	0	–		1	0	0	0	1	0
Blackpool	1999–2000	Second Division	8	0	0	0	0	0	0	0	8	0
Blackpool	2000–01	Third Division	39	8	1	0	3	0	1 (Note: Appearances in the Football League Trophy)	0	44	8
Blackpool	2001–02	Second Division	36	1	2	0	2	0	5	1	45	2
Blackpool	2002–03	Second Division	39	1	3	0	1	0	2	0	45	1
Blackpool	2003–04	Second Division	41	3	2	0	3	0	4	0	50	3
Blackpool	2004–05	League One	28	3	4	2	0	0	2	0	34	5
Blackpool	Total		191	16	12	2	9	0	14	1	226	19
Oldham Athletic	2005–06	League One	45	4	4	0	1	0	1	0	51	4
Oldham Athletic	2006–07	League One	42	4	4	0	1	0	3 (Note: One appearance in the Football League Trophy; two appearances in League One play-offs)	0	50	4
Oldham Athletic	Total		87	8	8	0	2	0	4	0	101	8
Doncaster Rovers	2007–08	League One	45	6	2	0	2	1	4 (Note: Two appearances in the Football League Trophy, two appearances in League One play-offs)	0	53	7
Doncaster Rovers	2008–09	Championship	39	3	4	0	1	0	–		44	3
Doncaster Rovers	Total		84	9	6	0	3	1	4	0	97	10
Leicester City	2009–10	Championship	41	1	2	0	1	0	2 (Note: Appearances in Championship play-offs)	0	46	1
Leicester City	2010–11	Championship	45	2	2	0	4	2	–		51	4
Leicester City	2011–12	Championship	41	1	5	0	0	0	–		46	1
Leicester City	2012–13	Championship	2	0	2	0	0	0	0	0	4	0
Leicester City	Total		129	4	11	0	5	2	2	0	147	6
Ipswich Town (loan)	2012–13	Championship	7	0	0	0	0	0	–		7	0
Doncaster Rovers	2013–14	Championship	37	0	0	0	2	0	–		39	0
Doncaster Rovers	2014–15	League One	39	3	4	1	2	0	2	1	47	5
Doncaster Rovers	2015–16	League One	12	0	1	0	2	0	1	0	16	0
Doncaster Rovers	Total		88	3	5	1	6	0	3	1	102	5
Oldham Athletic	2015–16	League One	3	0	0	0	0	0	0	0	3	0
Shrewsbury Town	2015–16	League One	12	0	0	0	0	0	0	0	12	0
Career total			601	40	42	3	26	3	29	2	698	48

== Managerial statistics ==
As of match played 21 November 2026

Managerial record by team and tenure
Team	From	To	Record					Ref.
Team	From	To	P	W	D	L	Win %	Ref.
Oldham Athletic	25 September 2017	8 June 2018	43	14	16	13	32.6	
Swindon Town	13 November 2018	4 November 2020	84	35	17	32	41.7	
Salford City	4 November 2020	22 March 2021	30	11	10	9	36.7	
Doncaster Rovers	17 May 2021	2 December 2021	26	6	5	15	23.1	
Leyton Orient	9 March 2022	Present	251	108	52	91	43.0	
Total			434	174	100	160	40.1	

== Honours ==
=== Player ===
Blackpool

- Football League Third Division play-offs: 2001
- Football League Trophy: 2001–02, 2003–04

Doncaster Rovers

- Football League One play-offs: 2008

Individual

- PFA Team of the Year: 2003–04 Second Division, 2006–07 League One, 2007–08 League One
- Doncaster Rovers Player of the Year: 2007–08
- Football League Championship Player of the Month: January 2011
- Leicester City Player of the Year: 2010–11

=== Manager ===
Swindon Town

- EFL League Two: 2019–20

Salford City

- EFL Trophy: 2019–20

Leyton Orient

- EFL League Two: 2022–23

Individual

- EFL League Two Manager of the Season: 2022–23
- EFL League One Manager of the Month: January 2024, December 2024, January 2025
- EFL League Two Manager of the Month: November 2019, August 2022, September 2022
