= Matty Barlow =

English footballer

Personal information
- Full name: Matthew John Barlow
- Date of birth: 25 June 1987 (age 39)
- Place of birth: Oldham, England
- Height: 5 ft 11 in (1.80 m)
- Position: Striker

Team information
- Current team: Stirling Lions

Youth career
- 2000–2004: Oldham Athletic

Senior career*
| Years | Team | Apps | (Gls) |
| 2004–2007 | Oldham Athletic | 10 | (0) |
| 2006–2007 | → Stafford Rangers (loan) | 2 | (0) |
| 2007 | → Stalybridge Celtic (loan) | 15 | (5) |
| 2007–2010 | Stalybridge Celtic | 113 | (30) |
| 2010–2011 | Armadale | ? | (?) |
| 2011 | Hyde | 12 | (3) |
| 2011–2012 | Armadale | ? | (?) |
| 2012– | Stirling Lions | 0 | (0) |
- * Club domestic league appearances and goals as of 2 February 2012 (UTC)

Matthew John Barlow (born 25 June 1987) is an English footballer who plays for Ashton United having joined them in the summer of 2012 from Stirling Lions in the Football West State League.

He started his career at his hometown club Oldham Athletic after being spotted as a child. He played ten times for their first team in the league and twelve times in total. In 2006, he joined Stafford Rangers on loan where he played in non-league football for the first time. On his return from the loan he was sent out on loan again to Stalybridge Celtic where he scored five goals in fifteen games. He returned to Oldham in the summer of 2007 and was released and subsequently re-joined Stalybridge on a permanent basis. After three seasons with Stalybridge, scoring in the double figures in every one of the three seasons, he moved to Australia to play for semi-pro side Armadale SC, but after just eight months he moved back to England to join Stalybridge rivals Hyde. In February 2012 Barlow signed for the Australian club Stirling Lions who play in the Football West State League.

Described as "quick down the middle" and "good at making surging runs", he has won a Lancashire Senior Cup winners medal with Oldham Athletic and has played in a Conference North play-off final with Stalybridge Celtic.

== Career ==
=== Oldham Athletic ===
Born in Oldham, Greater Manchester, he joined his home-town club Oldham Athletic and progressed through the youth squads. In May 2004 he turned professional by signing a professional contract at the club.

On 8 May 2004 he made his league debut as a second-half substitute replacing Scott Vernon in the 1–1 draw away to Notts County. Barlow enjoyed nine other league games, and two League Cup games the following season, after which his only first team appearance for Oldham was in the Football League Trophy defeat at home to Chesterfield in November 2006. He joined Stafford Rangers on loan later that month, playing twice in the Conference National before returning to Oldham during the January transfer window. On 30 January Barlow joined Stalybridge Celtic on loan until the end of the season. He made his debut for Stalybridge on 3 February 2007 in a 2–1 win over Alfreton Town and he scored his first goal for the club on his second appearance in a 3–2 los s to Nuneaton Town. He enjoyed another thirteen games for the club scoring four more times before returning to Oldham at the end of the 2006–07 season.

=== Stalybridge Celtic ===
On his return, Barlow was released by Oldham and he then signed permanently for Stalybridge Celtic in July 2007. He made his second debut for the club in a 1–0 loss to Kettering Town and it took him until his eighth game for the club to get his name on the scoresheet, scoring in a 5–2 win over Vauxhall Motors on 15 September 2007. On 9 October 2007, he scored his first brace for the club when Stalybridge beat Gainsborough Trinity 5–1 in the Conference North. It took until his second season with the club to score a cup goal, this goal coming as part of a 4–0 win over Farsley Celtic in the FA Cup. He enjoyed three seasons with Stalybrige playing 135 games in all competitions scoring 36 goals, before in May 2010 he decided to leave England to try his luck in Australia going to play for Armadale SC.

=== Hyde ===
On 25 February 2011, he moved back to England to join Conference North outfit Hyde. He made his debut on the following day in the Conference North in Hyde's 2–1 loss to Vauxhall Motors at Ewen Fields. He then scored his first goal in a 3–2 loss to Solihull Moors. He netted his second goal for the club in his eighth game, scoring the second as Hyde beat Hinckley United 3–0.

=== Back to Australia ===
After leaving Hyde in April 2011, he moved back to Australia to join back up with his former side Armadale, but in February 2012 he signed for Football West State League side Stirling Lions.

== Style of play ==
Barlow is described as "quick running down the centre" and good at "surging runs". Barlow was said to have had a "sensational end to the 2006–07 season" after scoring many times for Stalybridge.

== Career statistics ==
As of 5 February 2012.

Appearances and goals by club, season and competition
| Club | Season | League | | FA Cup | | League Cup | | Other | | Total | |
| Club | Season | Apps | Goals | Apps | Goals | Apps | Goals | Apps | Goals | Apps | Goals |
|---|---|---|---|---|---|---|---|---|---|---|---|
| Oldham Athletic | 2003–04 | 1 | 0 | 0 | 0 | 0 | 0 | 0 | 0 | 1 | 0 |
| Oldham Athletic | 2004–05 | 9 | 0 | 0 | 0 | 2 | 0 | 0 | 0 | 11 | 0 |
| Oldham Athletic | 2005–06 | 0 | 0 | 0 | 0 | 0 | 0 | 0 | 0 | 0 | 0 |
| Oldham Athletic | 2006–07 | 0 | 0 | 0 | 0 | 0 | 0 | 0 | 0 | 0 | 0 |
| Oldham Athletic | Total | 10 | 0 | 0 | 0 | 2 | 0 | 0 | 0 | 12 | 0 |
| Stafford Rangers (loan) | 2006–07 | 2 | 0 | 0 | 0 | — | | 0 | 0 | 2 | 0 |
| Stalybridge Celtic (loan) | 2006–07 | 15 | 5 | 0 | 0 | — | | 0 | 0 | 15 | 5 |
| Stalybridge Celtic | 2007–08 | 41 | 11 | 2 | 0 | — | | 5 | 0 | 48 | 11 |
| Stalybridge Celtic | 2008–09 | 38 | 10 | 2 | 1 | — | | 6 | 2 | 46 | 13 |
| Stalybridge Celtic | 2009–10 | 34 | 9 | 3 | 2 | — | | 4 | 1 | 41 | 12 |
| Stalybridge Celtic | Total | 113 | 30 | 7 | 3 | — | | 15 | 3 | 135 | 36 |
| Armadale | 2010–11 | ? | ? | ? | ? | — | | ? | ? | ? | ? |
| Hyde | 2010–11 | 12 | 3 | 0 | 0 | — | | 0 | 0 | 12 | 3 |
| Career totals | | 152 | 38 | 7 | 3 | 2 | 0 | 15 | 3 | 176 | 44 |

== Honours ==
=== Club ===
Oldham Athletic

- Lancashire Senior Cup (1): 2004–05

Stalybridge Celtic

- Conference North play off final, runner up (1): 2007–08
