= Sam Rents =

English footballer (born 1987)

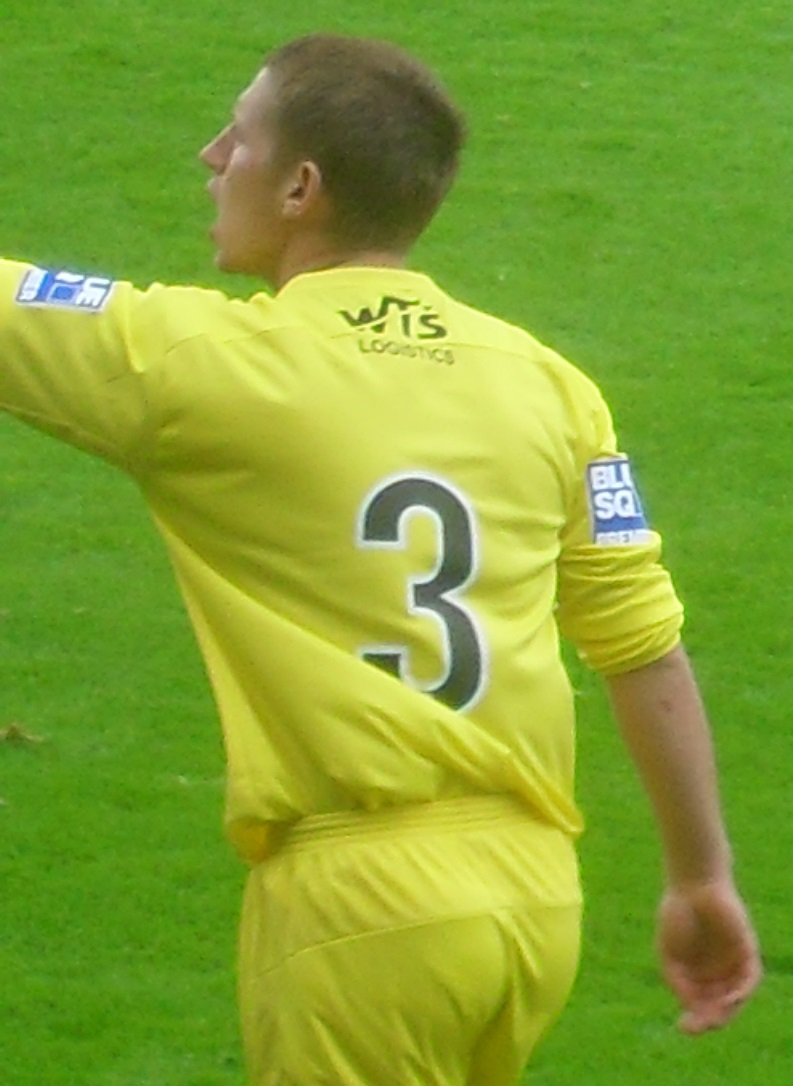
- Rents playing for Crawley Town in 2009

Personal information
- Full name: Samuel David Rents
- Date of birth: 22 June 1987 (age 39)
- Place of birth: Brighton, England
- Position: Defender

Senior career*
Years	Team	Apps	(Gls)
2006–2008	Brighton & Hove Albion	30	(0)
2008–2011	Crawley Town	83	(4)
2011	→ Hayes & Yeading United (loan)	8	(1)
2011–2012	Gateshead	29	(0)
2012–2014	Sutton United	59	(7)
2014–2016	Margate	3	(0)
2015–2016	→ Tonbridge Angels (loan)		
2016	Whitehawk	16	(0)
2016–2019	Worthing	92	(5)
2019	Eastbourne Borough	2	(0)
- * Club domestic league appearances and goals as of 16 February 2019 (UTC)

Samuel David Rents (born 22 June 1987) is an English former footballer who most recently played for Eastbourne Borough as a defender.

== Career ==
Born in Brighton, Rents signed a one-year professional contract with Brighton & Hove Albion in 2006 along with 10 others from the same youth group. He made his debut as a second-half substitute in a 1–0 defeat to Bristol City at Ashton Gate, and made his full debut a week later in Dean Wilkins' first game as manager of the club, in the 1–0 victory at Millwall's New Den stadium.

Rents also scored his first goal for the club in the first round of the FA Cup in Brighton's emphatic 8–0 victory against Northwich Victoria.

Rents was awarded with a new contract by the club during May 2007 after making his breakthrough in the first team during the 2006–07 season.

On 6 May 2008, it was revealed that Rents, along with Shane McFaul were to be released from the club.

Rents agreed a contract with Crawley Town on 23 May 2008, turning down the opportunity to join League Two Darlington. Rents was a regular fixture at left-back throughout his first two seasons at Crawley, scoring his first goal for the Red Devils in a 5–2 victory over Northwich Victoria in August 2008. On 6 June 2010, Rents signed a contract extension with Crawley Town. On 18 March 2011, Rents joined Hayes & Yeading United on loan, scoring one goal in eight appearances. He was released by Crawley Town on 13 May 2011.

On 31 May 2011, Rents joined Gateshead on an initial one-year contract. He made his debut as a late substitute in Gateshead's 3–1 win over Southport at Haig Avenue on 23 August. He made his first start for Gateshead on 29 August 2011 against Grimsby Town in a 1–0 win. Rents was released by Gateshead at the end of the season.

On 5 July 2012, it was announced that Rents would be joining Sutton United. Rents signed for Margate in January 2014 and was an integral member of the squad that won promotion to National League South in 2015. After a spell on loan at Tonbridge Angels, he joined Whitehawk in March 2016.

In June 2016, Rents signed for Isthmian League Premier newcomers Worthing.

== Career statistics ==
As of 18 May 2013

Appearances and goals by club, season and competition
Club	Season	League (Note: Includes Football League and Football Conference)		FA Cup		League Cup		Other (Note: IncludesFootball League Trophy, FA Trophy, Conference League Cup and Surrey Senior Cup.)		Total	
Club	Season	Apps	Goals	Apps	Goals	Apps	Goals	Apps	Goals	Apps	Goals
Brighton & Hove Albion	2006–07	25	0	3	1	0	0	1	0	29	1
Brighton & Hove Albion	2007–08	5	0	1	0	1	0	1	0	8	0
Brighton & Hove Albion	Total	30	0	4	1	1	0	2	0	37	1
Crawley Town	2008–09	39	3	1	0	0	0	5	1	45	4
Crawley Town	2009–10	39	1	1	0	0	0	2	1	42	2
Crawley Town	2010–11	5	0	2	0	0	0	0	0	7	0
Crawley Town	Total	83	4	4	0	0	0	7	2	94	6
Hayes & Yeading United (loan)	2010–11	8	1	0	0	0	0	0	0	8	1
Gateshead	2011–12	29	0	2	0	0	0	5	0	36	0
Sutton United	2012–13	42	7	1	0	0	0	14	0	57	7
Career total		192	12	11	1	1	0	28	2	232	15
