= Terry Smith (footballer, born 1987) =

English footballer

Personal information
- Date of birth: 16 September 1987 (age 39)
- Place of birth: Chester, England
- Position: Goalkeeper

Team information
- Current team: Runcorn Linnets

Youth career
- 2003–2005: Oldham Athletic

Senior career*
| Years | Team | Apps | (Gls) |
| 2005–2007 | Oldham Athletic | 1 | (0) |
| 2007 | → Southport (loan) | 10 | (0) |
| 2007–2008 | Southport | 1 | (0) |
| 2008–2017 | Ashton United | | |
| 2017– | Runcorn Linnets | | |
- * Club domestic league appearances and goals

Terry Smith (born 16 September 1987, in Chester) is an English former professional football goalkeeper, who plays for Ashton United

== Career ==
Smith began his career as a trainee with Oldham Athletic, turning professional in August 2005. He made his club debut on 22 August 2006 when he was a first-half substitute for the injured Chris Howarth in Oldham's 3–1 League Cup defeat away to Rotherham United. He remained on the bench for the following game, a 0–0 defeat at home to Carlisle United, and was brought on as a substitute for midfielder Paul Warne after goalkeeper David Knight had been sent off for handling the ball outside of the penalty area.

He joined Southport on loan in March 2007, and signed for them on a permanent basis in July 2007, having been released by Oldham. He played just once for Southport the following season, a 1–0 defeat away to Harrogate Town on 23 October.

He moved to Ashton United in the 2008 close-season and immediately established himself as first choice keeper, winning the Manager's and Supporters' Player of the Year Awards in his first campaign. At the start of 2010–11 he went 508 minutes until conceding his first goal of the season. Despite a broken rib, kept his sixteenth clean sheet of the season as Ashton won the Northern Premier League Cup for the first time in their history.

In 2017, he joined Hallmark Security Football League club Runcorn Linnets.
