= Ashley Kelly (footballer) =

English footballer

Personal information
- Full name: Ashley Craig Kelly
- Date of birth: 22 December 1988 (age 37)
- Place of birth: Manchester, England
- Height: 5 ft 8 in (1.73 m)
- Position: Midfielder

Youth career
- Oldham Athletic

Senior career*
Years	Team	Apps	(Gls)
2007–2012	Oldham Athletic	17	(2)
2007	→ Leigh RMI (loan)	1	(0)
2007	→ Barrow (loan)	10	(4)
2013-2014	Salford City	35	(10)
2012-2014	Curzon Ashton	3	(0)
2015	Hyde	5	(1)
2015	Northwich Victoria		
2016	Hyde	8	(3)
- * Club domestic league appearances and goals as of 07:11, 7 March 2012 (UTC)

Ashley Craig Kelly (born 22 December 1988) is an English football midfielder.

He started his career at Oldham Athletic having loan spells with Barrow and Leigh RMI, before moving to Salford City, Curzon Ashton and Chester.

== Career ==
=== Oldham Athletic ===
Born in Manchester, Kelly was given a full-time contract with Oldham Athletic in Summer 2007, having successfully played as a youth and reserve player at the club. In October 2007, he joined Leigh RMI on loan for one month, making a solitary appearance against Blyth Spartans. He later signed for Barrow on loan in December 2007 & helped them to promotion.

Kelly's first senior squad appearance for Oldham Athletic came on 12 April 2008 in a 2–0 win over Leyton Orient. In April 2008, Kelly and teammate Mike Pearson could not agree terms on a contract extension & both left the club.

=== Into Non-league ===
After leaving ‘the Latics', he has a short spell at Salford City, before moving to Curzon Ashton.

He then joined Conference North side Hyde F.C. in December 2011. In the summer of 2012 he joined Northwich Victoria but left the club within the first few months of the season.

As of 2016, Kelly does not currently play for any football team.
