= Chris Howarth =

English footballer (born 1986)

Personal information
- Full name: Christopher Howarth
- Date of birth: 23 May 1986 (age 40)
- Place of birth: Bolton, England
- Height: 5 ft 11 in (1.80 m)
- Position: Goalkeeper

Youth career
- –2005: Bolton Wanderers

Senior career*
Years	Team	Apps	(Gls)
2005–2007	Bolton Wanderers	0	(0)
2006	→ Stockport County (loan)	0	(0)
2006	→ Oldham Athletic (loan)	3	(0)
2007	→ Carlisle United (loan)	0	(0)
2007–2009	Carlisle United	0	(0)
2009–2010	Droylsden	6	(0)
2010–2011	Rhyl		
2011	Chorley		
2011–	Salford City		

International career^{‡}
2001	England Schoolboys		
- * Club domestic league appearances and goals as of 11:50, 7 May 2007 (UTC) ‡ National team caps and goals as of 17:40, 22 March 2007 (UTC)

Christopher Howarth (born 23 May 1986) is an English footballer who plays as a goalkeeper.

After gaining the distinction of England schoolboy honours in 2001, this tall and agile player was signed up by his local club Bolton under the academy scholarship scheme where he would spend three years under the supervision of the youth coaching team.

He was given a four-year professional contract in 2005 as the understudy to more senior keepers at Bolton such as Jussi Jääskeläinen, Ian Walker and Ali Al Habsi.

In January 2006, Howarth joined Stockport County on a month-long loan, but returned to Bolton without any first team experience. Howarth was linked with a season-long loan move to St Johnstone in July 2006, but after a trial the Saints dropped their interest in Howarth. In the beginning of the 2006/2007 season Howarth joined Oldham Athletic on a month-long loan, making his debut in a game against Swansea City, saving a penalty taken by Swansea icon Lee Trundle. He has since returned to The Reebok. On 22 March 2007 Horwarth joined Carlisle United on loan until the end of the 2006–07 season after Tony Williams's loan move to Wrexham.

On 7 May 2007, Howarth signed for Carlisle United on a two-year contract.

Two days before the 2009/10 season he signed for Droylsden, He was number two behind Craig Mawson but became the club's main Keeper when Mawson was released. He then signed for Welsh club Rhyl in the summer of 2010, before moving to Garry Flitcroft's Chorley in March 2011. He joined Salford City in October 2011.
