= Les Pogliacomi =

Australian soccer player

Personal information
- Full name: Leslie Amado Pogliacomi
- Date of birth: 3 May 1976 (age 50)
- Place of birth: Sydney, Australia
- Height: 1.93 m (6 ft 4 in)
- Position: Goalkeeper

Senior career*
Years	Team	Apps	(Gls)
1994–1997	Marconi Stallions	22	(0)
1997–1998	Adelaide City	0	(0)
1998	Canterbury-Marrickville	2	(0)
1998–1999	Wollongong Wolves	22	(0)
1999	Moorebanks Sports		
1999–2000	Wollongong Wolves	34	(6)
2000–2002	Parramatta Power	27	(0)
2002–2005	Oldham Athletic	141	(0)
2005–2006	Blackpool	20	(0)
2006–2008	Oldham Athletic	39	(0)
2009–2013	Campbelltown City	101	(0)
2019	Campbelltown City	1	(0)
Total		409	(6)

International career
1994–1995	Australia U-20	4	(0)
- * Club domestic league appearances and goals

Leslie Amado Pogliacomi (born 3 May 1976) is an Australian former association football player.

== Club career ==
He was dropped for Chris Day by Ronnie Moore in the 2005–06 season, and went to Blackpool; however, John Sheridan brought him back to Oldham in the 2006–07 season. Pogliacomi was an Australian Schoolboy international in 1994 and represented the Australia under-20 team in 1995. Pogliacomi started playing top-flight football in Australia for various NSL teams before being rated one of the better goalkeepers playing in Australia before moving to England. He is well known for being the goalkeeper for Wollongong Wolves in 2000 when they won the NSL grand final against Perth Glory 3–3 (7–6 on penalties) where two saves of his, with the game on the line, won the championship for Wollongong.

On 26 February 2008, it was announced that due to an injury requiring extensive surgery and rehabilitation, Pogliacomi's contract with Oldham Athletic was mutually terminated. He went on to play for a small team in Adelaide for fun and worked in his father-in-law's business.
