= Chord Melodic =

British actor (born 1986)

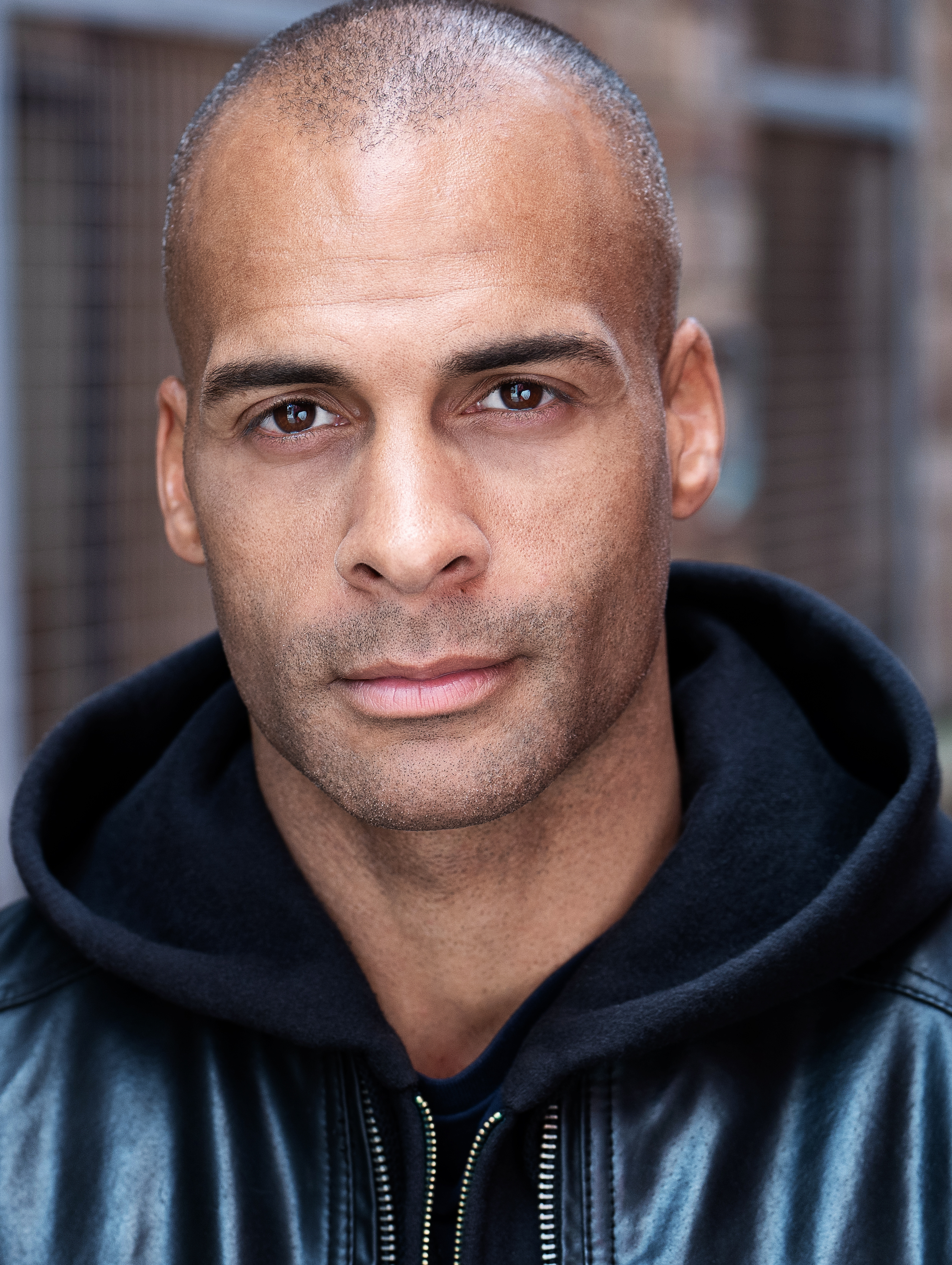
- Born: Christopher Michael Hall; 27 November 1986 (age 39); Manchester, England
- Education: Manchester School of Acting
- Occupation: Actor
- Years active: 2008–present
Association football career
- Position: Striker
Youth career
- 2003–2005: Oldham Athletic
Senior career*
Years	Team	Apps	(Gls)
2003–2007	Oldham Athletic	43	(1)
2007–2008	Stalybridge Celtic	40	(16)
2008–2010	Bradford Park Avenue	58	(35)
2011	Mossley	12	(0)
2013	Stalybridge Celtic	13	(6)
2013–2014	Harrogate Town	42	(16)
- * Club domestic league appearances and goals
- Website: chordmelodic.com

Chord Melodic (born Christopher Michael Hall; 27 November 1986) is a British actor. He is best known for his portrayal as Sledge, in the BAFTA Award-winning crime drama series Happy Valley.

Born in Manchester, he began his career as an actor in 2007, when he appeared in a groundbreaking play called OUTLOUD. His television career began a short time after in 2008, when he starred in the children's drama series Grange Hill along with various other television shows, such as British crime drama Blue Murder and police procedural series Scott & Bailey. He also starred in British comedy drama's Shameles and British television anthology series Coming Up (TV series). His other works include appearances in the medical drama series Holby City, along with a recurring role, in the world's longest running soap opera Coronation Street.

He is also a former professional footballer playing as a striker for Oldham Athletic, where he earned his first professional contract at the age of 16 and subsequently made his debut for the club shortly after in 2003. He was the second youngest player of all time to make their debut for the club during that period. In 2007, he retired from professional football to concentrate on his acting career.

== Early life ==
Born in Manchester, England, on 27 November 1986, he is of English, Irish and West Indian (St. Kitts and Nevis) ancestry.

Melodic started acting at the age of 12 and was involved in numerous school productions.

At 20, he was cast in the play OUTLOUD, a cutting-edge play that celebrates diversity and helps raise awareness of homophobia, bullying and discrimination.

== Career ==
=== Football career ===
He came through the youth team at Oldham Athletic, playing as a striker. He was prolific at youth and reserve team levels, and thus made his debut for the club in 2003 at the age of 16, which made him the second youngest player of all time to make their debut for the club at the time, after Wayne Harrison debuted at 16 in 1985, who became the world's most expensive teenager, with his record-breaking transfer from Oldham Athletic to Liverpool. After progressing through the ranks at Boundary Park, he later earned his first professional contract. However, after he broke his leg in February 2007, he decided to retire from professional football to concentrate on his acting career. He made 7 starts and 36 substitute appearances, scoring five goals, most notably his late equalizer in the 2–2 FA Cup draw against Wolverhampton Wanderers FC at Molineux Stadium, which earned Oldham a third round replay. The club had earlier banned him from appearing in a theatrical performance of the Full Monty. However, he was later given the green light by club officials, when they went back on their decision to block his participation, after he had explained to them that it was all for charity. He then signed for non-League club Stalybridge Celtic in July 2007. He finished the season top goal scorer, scoring 19 goals in 49 appearances and was called up to the England C team, which represents the best non-league talent. At the end of the 2007–08 season he left to sign for Bradford Park Avenue, where he played until the end of the 2009–10 season, scoring 35 goals in 58 league appearances. In 2010, he had a brief spell at Mossley, playing twelve games. However, he returned to Stalybridge Celtic for the remainder of the 2012–13 season, scoring 6 goals in 13 appearances, before signing for Harrogate Town for the 2013–14 season. He finished the season, scoring 16 goals in 42 league appearances, before retiring from the game in 2014.

=== Acting career ===
Chord's first paid acting role was in 2007 for Hope Theatre Company in Manchester. He was one of the four original cast members of OUTLOUD, the UK's longest running, anti-homophobia theatre project. It is a ground-breaking verbatim play devised by Adam Zane that explores homophobia, bullying and hate crime. The play is based on interviews with young LGBT+ people. He played a number of parts throughout the plays tour.

Melodic's major television debut came in 2008 when he starred in the British television children's drama series Grange Hill, where he appeared as ex-pupil and football superstar Dwayne Miller. Subsequent roles later that year included the BBC drama spin-off Spooks: Code 9 and ITV daytime drama serial The Royal Today.

He then spent three months portraying music producer Matt Crosby, in the British soap opera Hollyoaks, opposite Emma Rigby. Joining the cast in November 2008, and remaining there until his character's departure in January 2009.

Later that year, he landed a role on the ITV detective drama series Blue Murder, where he played biker Kyle Torrence, caught in the middle of a bitter and adulterous rivalry, between Helen the auntie, and her teenage niece Jess, his girlfriend, played by Holliday Grainger.

He followed that up with numerous roles including BAFTA Award-winning drama Shameless in 2011, and ITV's British drama series Scott & Bailey.

More recent projects included a guest appearance on Channel 4's comedy drama Coming Up (TV series), opposite Debra Stephenson, Con O'Neill, and Jodie Comer.

In 2015, Melodic starred in Sally Wainwright's BAFTA Award-winning crime drama series Happy Valley, as Sledge, opposite Sarah Lancashire and Charlie Murphy. In May 2015, Happy Valley won the BAFTA Award for Best Drama Series. This was the first of two Bafta's for Happy Valley, which won the same category in 2017.

He then made a guest appearance on British medical soap opera Doctors in 2016 as Police Constable Dave Blaire.

Following that, he later appeared in British medical drama television series Holby City in January 2018. He starred opposite Hugh Quarshie, as Dillon Matthews a prison kingpin, who takes Ric under his wing in order to expand his empire.

=== 2019–present ===
As of 2019, Chord has been starring in the ITV British soap opera Coronation Street as Joe Haslam, an ex-soldier and owner of a private military company, who helped to bring down super villain Pat Phelan.

In October 2022, BBC and AMC Networks confirmed, that Chord Melodic would be returning for the third series of Sally Wainwright's multi-BAFTA award-winning hit Happy Valley, alongside Sarah Lancashire and Charlie Murphy.

In 2024, Melodic starred as Owen Pierce, in series three of the acclaimed crime drama, The Tower, opposite Gemma Whelan. Based on Kate London's third novel, the series is adapted by Homeland screenwriter and executive producer, Patrick Harbinson.

== Filmography ==
=== Television ===
Year	Title	Role	Notes
2008	Grange Hill	Dwayne Miller	Episode: "Food Fight"
2008–2009	Hollyoaks	Matt Crosby	6 Episodes
2009	Blue Murder	Kyle Torrance	Episode: "Having It All"
2011	Shameless	Simon Wexford	Episode: "#8.22"
2012	Scott & Bailey	Royston Marley	Episode: "#2.6"
2012	Coming Up	Jamie	Episode: "Postcode Lottery"
2016–2023	Happy Valley	Sledge	9 Episodes
2016	Doctors	PC Dave Blaire	Episode: "In Every Home a Heartache: Part One"
2017–2019	Coronation Street	Joe Haslam	Regular role
2018	Holby City	Dillon Matthews	Episode: "The Prisoner"
2024	The Tower	Owen Pierce	Episode: "Gallowstree Lane"
