= Mike Pearson (footballer) =

Welsh association football player

Michael Pearson
Personal information
- Full name: Michael Thomas Pearson
- Date of birth: 19 January 1988 (age 38)
- Place of birth: Bangor, Wales
- Positions: Defender; midfielder

Team information
- Current team: Newtown (player/ assistant manager)

Youth career
- ?–2006: Oldham Athletic

Senior career*
| Years | Team | Apps | (Gls) |
| 2006–2008 | Oldham Athletic | 2 | (0) |
| 2006–2007 | → Farsley Celtic (loan) | 7 | (0) |
| 2008–2013 | Barrow | 151 | (4) |
| 2013–2016 | Airbus UK Broughton | 84 | (4) |
| 2016–2018 | Connah's Quay Nomads | 28 | (0) |
| 2018–2019 | Llandudno | 19 | (2) |
| 2019–2020 | Caernarfon Town | 6 | (0) |
| 2020–2023 | Llandudno | 2 | (0) |
| 2023 | Cefn Albion | 8 | (0) |
| 2024-2025 | Holywell Town | 36 | (2) |
| 2025 | Trearddur Bay | 2 | (0) |
| 2026 | Denbigh Town | 7 | (0) |
| 2026– | Newtown | 0 | (0) |

International career
- Wales U15
- Wales U16
| 2004 | Wales U17 | 4 | (0) |
| 2010–2018 | Wales C | 3 | (0) |
- * Club domestic league appearances and goals as of 07:35, 11 August 2026 (UTC)

Michael Thomas Pearson (born 19 January 1988) is a Welsh footballer who is currently assistant manager at Cymru North club Newtown where he is also registered as a player. He was previously with Barrow in the Conference National in England, with whom he played from July 2008 until June 2013. He began his career with football league team Oldham Athletic. He plays as either a defender or midfielder.

== Club career ==
=== Oldham Athletic ===
Pearson went through Oldham Athletic's youth system and was a part of the club's youth Championship. He made several appearances for the reserve team before being promoted to the first team. He made his first-team debut against Millwall in a 2–1 loss on 17 February 2007. In the summer of 2007, Pearson signed a one-year contract extension to remain at Boundary Park. Pearson was loaned out to Farsley Celtic of Conference National between October and December 2007. His first appearance came in a 3–0 rout of Droylsden. Though in April 2008, both Pearson and teammate Ashley Kelly were told by Oldham that they were to be released at the end of their contracts.

=== Barrow ===
Pearson played a series of trial games with Barrow AFC in summer 2008, before signing for the Conference National team before the start of the 2008–09 season. He made his debut in Barrow's 3–0 victory over Oxford United. In a 2008–09 FA Cup clash with Premier League side Middlesbrough, Pearson received an injury in the 52nd minute after a challenge with Marvin Emnes, a collision which left Pearson with a double leg-break. He was ruled out for the remainder of the season, but Barrow manager Dave Bayliss assured Pearson would remain with the club. The Bluebirds lost to Middlesbrough 2–1. In March, Pearson reported that he hoped to recover in time for the 2009–10 season. In May 2011 he was offered a new contract by Barrow.

=== Welsh Football ===
Pearson became a major part of the Barrow squad, making over 150 league appearances for the club. When the club was relegated in at the end of the 2012–13 season, he moved to Airbus UK Broughton.

In 2017/18, Pearson joined Connah's Quay Nomads, making his debut in a 1–0 win over HJK Helsinki in the Europa League.

In May 2018, Pearson left Connah's Quay to join Llandudno. Pearson spent a year with the club before joining Caernarfon Town, but returned to Llandudno in 2020. Due to injury, he took up the position of Assistant Manager at the club.

In January 2024, Pearson joined his younger brother Shaun at Cymru North side Holywell Town. He won the JD Cymru North with the club in his first season.

After a brief spell with Trearddur Bay, he joined Cymru North side Denbigh Town in January 2026. He made his debut as a late substitute in a 1-0 win over Newtown on January 24th.

He joined Newtown as assistant manager in June 2026.

== International career ==
Pearson has represented Wales in the Under-15 and Under-16 levels of competition. In March 2010, he made his debut for the Wales semi-professional side in a 7–2 defeat to Portugal.

== Honours ==
Barrow

- FA Trophy: 2009–10

Connah's Quay Nomads

- Welsh Cup: 2017–18

Holywell Town

- Cymru North: 2023–24

Individual

- Welsh Premier League Team of the Year: 2014–15, 2015–16
