= 2021–22 EFL Cup =

Carabao Cup, League Cup

Tournament details
- Country: England; Wales
- Dates: 31 July 2021 – 27 February 2022
- Teams: 92

Final positions
- Champions: Liverpool (9th title)
- Runners-up: Chelsea

Tournament statistics
- Matches played: 93
- Goals scored: 256 (2.75 per match)
- Top goal scorer(s): Marcus Forss; Eddie Nketiah (5 goals each)

The 2021–22 EFL Cup was the 62nd season of the EFL Cup (known as the Carabao Cup for sponsorship reasons). The competition was open to all clubs participating in the Premier League and the English Football League.

The winner of the competition qualifies for the play-off round of the 2022–23 UEFA Europa Conference League.

The competition began on 31 July 2021, and the final was played at Wembley Stadium on 27 February 2022 between Chelsea and Liverpool, with Liverpool winning a record ninth title 11–10 on penalties following a goalless draw after extra time.

Manchester City were the holders, having won the previous four editions, but they were eliminated by West Ham United on penalties in the fourth round.

== Access ==
All 92 clubs in the Premier League and English Football League entered the season's EFL Cup. Access was distributed across the top 4 leagues of the English football league system. For the first two rounds, the draw was regionalised into northern and southern clubs.

In the first round, 22 of 24 Championship clubs, and all League One and League Two clubs entered.

The following round, the two remaining Championship clubs, who finished 18th and 19th in the 2020–21 Premier League season (Fulham and West Bromwich Albion), and the Premier League clubs not involved in either the Champions League, Europa League, or Europa Conference League entered.

	Clubs entering in this round	Clubs advancing from previous round	Number of games
First round (70 clubs)	24 clubs from EFL League Two; 24 clubs from EFL League One; 22 clubs from EFL Championship	N/A	35
Second round (50 clubs)	2 clubs from EFL Championship; 13 Premier League clubs (not involved in European competition)	35 winners from first round	25
Third round (32 clubs)	7 Premier League clubs (involved in European competition)	25 winners from second round	16
Fourth round (16 clubs)	No clubs enter the fourth round	16 winners from third round	8
Quarter-finals (8 clubs)	No clubs enter the quarter-finals	8 winners from fourth round	4
Semi-finals (4 clubs)	No clubs enter the semi-finals	4 winners from fifth round	4 (two-legged)
Final (2 clubs)	No clubs enter the final	2 winners from semi-finals	1

== First round ==
A total of 70 clubs played in the first round: 24 from League Two (tier 4), 24 from League One (tier 3), and 22 from the Championship (tier 2). The draw for this round was split on a geographical basis into 'northern' and 'southern' sections. Teams were drawn against a team from the same section.

=== Northern section ===
1 August 2021	Sheffield Wednesday (3)	0–0 (2–4 p)	Huddersfield Town (2)	Sheffield
13:00 BST		Report		Stadium: Hillsborough Stadium; Attendance: 12,860; Referee: Darren Bond
	Penalties
	Hutchinson (penalty scored); Adeniran (penalty scored); Luongo (penalty missed); Palmer (penalty missed)		(penalty scored) Rhodes; (penalty scored) Thomas; (penalty scored) Sinani; (penalty scored) O'Brien

10 August 2021	Barrow (4)	1–0	Scunthorpe United (4)	Barrow-in-Furness
19:45 BST	Sea 50'	Report		Stadium: Holker Street; Attendance: 1,320; Referee: Oliver Langford

10 August 2021	Blackburn Rovers (2)	1–2	Morecambe (3)	Blackburn
19:45 BST	Dolan 22'	Report	Stockton 52'; Phillips 84' (pen.)	Stadium: Ewood Park; Attendance: 5,283; Referee: Steve Martin

10 August 2021	Bolton Wanderers (3)	0–0 (5–4 p)	Barnsley (2)	Horwich
19:45 BST		Report		Stadium: University of Bolton Stadium; Attendance: 7,147; Referee: Ollie Yates
	Penalties
	Sarcevic (penalty scored); Isgrove (penalty scored); Bakayoko (penalty scored); Kachunga (penalty scored); Sheehan (penalty scored)		(penalty scored) Benson; (penalty scored) Kane; (penalty scored) Helik; (penalty scored) J. Williams; (penalty missed) Cole

10 August 2021	Derby County (2)	3–3 (5–3 p)	Salford City (4)	Derby
19:45 BST	Hutchinson 43'; Kazim-Richards 71' (pen.); Morrison 82'	Report	Turnbull; Morris 14', 74' (pen.)	Stadium: Pride Park Stadium; Attendance: 4,747; Referee: James Bell
	Penalties
	Shinnie (penalty scored); Kazim-Richards (penalty scored); Brown (penalty scored); Forsyth (penalty scored); Watson (penalty scored)		(penalty scored) Morris; (penalty missed) Burgess; (penalty scored) Touray; (penalty scored) Lund

10 August 2021 (Note: Rochdale received a bye following the postponement of the match due to COVID-19 cases among Harrogate Town's squad.)	Harrogate Town (4)	w/o	Rochdale (4)	Harrogate
19:45 BST				Stadium: Wetherby Road

10 August 2021	Hartlepool United (4)	0–1	Crewe Alexandra (3)	Hartlepool
19:45 BST		Report	Ainley 50'	Stadium: Victoria Park; Attendance: 3,149; Referee: Thomas Bramall

10 August 2021	Hull City (2)	1–1 (7–8 p)	Wigan Athletic (3)	Kingston upon Hull
19:45 BST	Lewis-Potter 55'	Report	Humphrys 50'	Stadium: MKM Stadium; Attendance: 4,139; Referee: Martin Coy
	Penalties
	Eaves (penalty scored); Scott (penalty scored); Wood (penalty scored); Emmanuel (penalty scored); M. Smith (penalty scored); Jarvis (penalty scored); Fleming (penalty scored); Bernard (penalty missed)		(penalty scored) Keane; (penalty scored) Aasgaard; (penalty scored) Jo. Jones; (penalty scored) Massey; (penalty scored) Naylor; (penalty scored) Ja. Jones; (penalty scored) Robinson; (penalty scored) Cousins

10 August 2021	Mansfield Town (4)	0–3	Preston North End (2)	Mansfield
19:45 BST		Report	Sinclair 45+1', 81'; Jakobsen 71'	Stadium: Field Mill; Attendance: 2,526; Referee: Ross Joyce

10 August 2021	Oldham Athletic (4)	2–2 (4–3 p)	Tranmere Rovers (4)	Oldham
19:45 BST	Bahamboula 59'; T. Davies 68' (o.g.)	Report	Foley 40'; Nevitt 51'	Stadium: Boundary Park; Attendance: 2,684; Referee: Scott Oldham
	Penalties
	Hart (penalty scored); Keillor-Dunn (penalty scored); Jameson (penalty missed); Stobbs (penalty scored); Adams (penalty scored)		(penalty scored) Spearing; (penalty missed) Glatzel; (penalty scored) Morris; (penalty missed) Clarke; (penalty scored) Dieseruvwe

10 August 2021	Port Vale (4)	1–2	Sunderland (3)	Stoke-on-Trent
19:45 BST	Proctor 67'	Report	Hawkes 40'; O'Brien 50' (pen.)	Stadium: Vale Park; Attendance: 3,267; Referee: Sam Allison

10 August 2021	Rotherham United (3)	1–2	Accrington Stanley (3)	Rotherham
19:45 BST	Sadlier 76'	Report	Charles 38'; Bishop 86'	Stadium: New York Stadium; Attendance: 3,131; Referee: Will Finnie

10 August 2021	Sheffield United (2)	1–0	Carlisle United (4)	Sheffield
19:45 BST	Brewster 24'	Report		Stadium: Bramall Lane; Attendance: 6,778; Referee: James Oldham

10 August 2021	Shrewsbury Town (3)	2–2 (4–2 p)	Lincoln City (3)	Shrewsbury
19:45 BST	Udoh 69', 79'	Report	Hopper 49'; Bishop 52'	Stadium: New Meadow; Attendance: 2,069; Referee: Andy Haines
	Penalties
	Bennett (penalty scored); Nurse (penalty scored); Davis (penalty scored); Vela (penalty missed); Bloxham (penalty scored)		(penalty scored) Scully; (penalty missed) Hopper; (penalty scored) Sanders; (penalty missed) Fiorini

10 August 2021	Stoke City (2)	2–1	Fleetwood Town (3)	Stoke-on-Trent
19:45 BST	Surridge 45'; Souttar 77'	Report	Chester 90+4' (o.g.)	Stadium: Bet365 Stadium; Attendance: 4,694; Referee: Anthony Backhouse

10 August 2021	Walsall (4)	0–0 (3–4 p)	Doncaster Rovers (3)	Walsall
19:45 BST		Report		Stadium: Bescot Stadium; Attendance: 2,384; Referee: John Busby
	Penalties
	Wilkinson (penalty scored); Phillips (penalty scored); Osadebe (penalty missed); Earing (penalty missed); Kiernan (penalty missed); Ward (penalty scored); Kinsella (penalty missed)		(penalty missed) Gardner; (penalty scored) Close; (penalty missed) Cukur; (penalty missed) E. Williams; (penalty scored) Barlow; (penalty scored) Anderson; (penalty scored) Knoyle

11 August 2021	Blackpool (2)	3–0	Middlesbrough (2)	Blackpool
19:45 BST	Connolly 31'; Lavery 77'; Anderson 78'	Report		Stadium: Bloomfield Road; Attendance: 5,836; Referee: Bobby Madley

11 August 2021	Nottingham Forest (2)	2–1	Bradford City (4)	West Bridgford
19:45 BST	Carvalho 39', 41'	Report	Cooke 54'	Stadium: City Ground; Attendance: 9,514; Referee: Peter Wright

=== Southern section ===
31 July 2021	Bournemouth (2)	5–0	Milton Keynes Dons (3)	Bournemouth
15:00 BST	Brooks 35', 83'; Solanke 47'; Billing 72'; Saydee 80'	Report		Stadium: Dean Court; Attendance: 5,746; Referee: Sam Purkiss

10 August 2021	Birmingham City (2)	1–0	Colchester United (4)	Birmingham
19:45 BST	Oakley 75'	Report		Stadium: St Andrew's; Attendance: 6,199; Referee: Declan Bourne

10 August 2021	Bristol Rovers (4)	0–2	Cheltenham Town (3)	Bristol
19:45 BST		Report	May 58'; Vassell 71'	Stadium: Memorial Stadium; Attendance: 2,409; Referee: Lee Swabey

10 August 2021	Cambridge United (3)	0–0 (3–1 p)	Swindon Town (4)	Cambridge
19:45 BST		Report		Stadium: Abbey Stadium; Attendance: 1,825; Referee: Trevor Kettle
	Penalties
	Ironside (penalty scored); Smith (penalty scored); Williams (penalty scored)		(penalty missed) Payne; (penalty missed) McKirdy; (penalty scored) Reed; (penalty missed) Hunt

10 August 2021	Cardiff City (2)	3–2	Sutton United (4)	Cardiff
19:45 BST	Watkins 44', 50'; Murphy 84'	Report	Wilson 4'; Rowe 90'	Stadium: Cardiff City Stadium; Attendance: 3,505; Referee: Josh Smith

10 August 2021	Charlton Athletic (3)	0–1	AFC Wimbledon (3)	Charlton
19:45 BST		Report	Osew 26'	Stadium: The Valley; Attendance: 3,372; Referee: Robert Lewis

10 August 2021	Crawley Town (4)	2–2 (9–10 p)	Gillingham (3)	Crawley
19:45 BST	Ashford 55'; Davies 90+7'	Report	Sithole 3'; Phillips 90+5'	Stadium: Broadfield Stadium; Attendance: 1,904; Referee: Paul Howard
	Penalties
	Francomb (penalty scored); Dallison (penalty scored); Craig (penalty scored); Powell (penalty scored); Nadesan (penalty scored); Hessenthaler (penalty scored); Tilley (penalty scored); Ferry (penalty scored); Davies (penalty scored); Francillette (penalty missed)		(penalty scored) Lee; (penalty scored) Oliver; (penalty scored) Lloyd; (penalty scored) Phillips; (penalty scored) O'Keefe; (penalty scored) Tutonda; (penalty scored) Maghoma; (penalty scored) Sithole; (penalty scored) Ehmer; (penalty scored) Lintott

10 August 2021	Exeter City (4)	0–0 (3–4 p)	Wycombe Wanderers (3)	Exeter
19:45 BST		Report		Stadium: St James Park; Attendance: 2,555; Referee: David Rock
	Penalties
	Sparkes (penalty missed); Sweeney (penalty scored); Seymour (penalty scored); J. Brown (penalty scored); Grounds (penalty missed); Dodd (penalty missed)		(penalty missed) Vokes; (penalty scored) Horgan; (penalty missed) Samuel; (penalty scored) Mehmeti; (penalty scored) Stockdale; (penalty scored) Pendlebury

10 August 2021	Forest Green Rovers (4)	2–2 (6–5 p)	Bristol City (2)	Nailsworth
19:45 BST	Matt 11'; Hendry 90+6'	Report	Janneh 39', 67'	Stadium: The New Lawn; Attendance: 2,554; Referee: Darren Drysdale
	Penalties
	Matt (penalty missed); Young (penalty scored); Hendry (penalty scored); Adams (penalty scored); Cadden (penalty scored); Stevenson (penalty scored); Sweeney (penalty scored)		(penalty missed) Palmer; (penalty scored) Massengo; (penalty scored) Wells; (penalty scored) Conway; (penalty scored) Bakinson; (penalty scored) Janneh; (penalty missed) Pring

10 August 2021	Ipswich Town (3)	0–1	Newport County (4)	Ipswich
19:45 BST		Report	Abraham 4'	Stadium: Portman Road; Attendance: 6,144; Referee: Neil Hair

10 August 2021	Millwall (2)	2–1	Portsmouth (3)	Bermondsey
19:45 BST	Malone 21'; Saville 27'	Report	Hackett-Fairchild 4'	Stadium: The Den; Attendance: 7,915; Referee: Charles Breakspear

10 August 2021	Peterborough United (2)	0–4	Plymouth Argyle (3)	Peterborough
19:45 BST		Report	Hardie 23', 33'; Jephcott 66'; Camará 84'	Stadium: London Road Stadium; Attendance: 4,021; Referee: Ben Toner

10 August 2021	Reading (2)	0–3	Swansea City (2)	Reading
19:45 BST		Report	Latibeaudiere 16'; Cabango 60'; Piroe 83'	Stadium: Madejski Stadium; Attendance: 4,989; Referee: Sam Barrott

10 August 2021	Stevenage (4)	2–2 (3–0 p)	Luton Town (2)	Stevenage
19:45 BST	List 2'; Coker 26'	Report	Jerome 5'; Muskwe 40'	Stadium: Broadhall Way; Attendance: 3,052; Referee: Andy Woolmer
	Penalties
	Lines (penalty scored); James-Wildin (penalty scored); Reeves (penalty scored)		(penalty missed) Cornick; (penalty missed) Mendes Gomes; (penalty missed) Pereira

11 August 2021	Burton Albion (3)	1–1 (2–4 p)	Oxford United (3)	Burton upon Trent
19:45 BST	Mousinho 90+7' (o.g.)	Report	Holland 85'	Stadium: Pirelli Stadium; Attendance: 1,868; Referee: Seb Stockbridge
	Penalties
	Akins (penalty missed); Shaughnessy (penalty scored); O'Connor (penalty missed); Blake-Tracy (penalty scored)		(penalty scored) Sykes; (penalty scored) Forde; (penalty scored) Agyei; (penalty scored) Mousinho

11 August 2021	Coventry City (2)	1–2	Northampton Town (4)	Coventry
19:45 BST	Walker 13'	Report	Etete 52', 70'	Stadium: Ricoh Arena; Attendance: 5,284; Referee: Ben Speedie

11 August 2021	Leyton Orient (4)	1–1 (3–5 p)	Queens Park Rangers (2)	Leyton
19:45 BST	Drinan 74'	Report	Dickie 16'	Stadium: Brisbane Road; Attendance: 4,071; Referee: Craig Hicks
	Penalties
	Drinan (penalty scored); Sotiriou (penalty missed); James (penalty scored); Kemp (penalty scored)		(penalty scored) Dykes; (penalty scored) Ball; (penalty scored) Dozzell; (penalty scored) Kelman; (penalty scored) Adomah

== Second round ==
A total of 50 clubs played in the second round: the 35 winners from the first round, the 2 clubs from the Championship (tier 2) who did not enter in the first round, plus the 13 Premier League clubs who were not in European competition. The draw for this round was split on a geographical basis into 'northern' and 'southern' sections. Teams were drawn against a team from the same section. The draw was held on 11 August 2021 after the conclusion of the first round tie between Leyton Orient and Queens Park Rangers, live on Sky Sports and it was made by Andy Townsend and Jobi McAnuff at 21:15 BST.

=== Northern section ===
24 August 2021	Oldham Athletic (4)	0–0 (5–4 p)	Accrington Stanley (3)	Oldham
19:45 BST		Report		Stadium: Boundary Park; Attendance: 2,362; Referee: Sebastian Stockbridge
	Penalties
	Hart (penalty scored); Keillor-Dunn (penalty scored); Bahamboula (penalty scored); Whelan (penalty scored); Adams (penalty missed); Luamba (penalty scored)		(penalty scored) Sykes; (penalty missed) Charles; (penalty scored) Morgan; (penalty scored) Savin; (penalty scored) Leigh; (penalty missed) Butcher

24 August 2021	Wigan Athletic (3)	0–0 (5–4 p)	Bolton Wanderers (3)	Wigan
19:45 BST		Report		Stadium: DW Stadium; Attendance: 11,660; Referee: Thomas Bramall
	Penalties
	Power (penalty scored); Aasgaard (penalty scored); Jo. Jones (penalty missed); Naylor (penalty scored); Humphrys (penalty scored); Ja. Jones (penalty scored)		(penalty scored) Doyle; (penalty scored) Sarcevic; (penalty missed) Lee; (penalty scored) Afolayan; (penalty scored) Sheehan; (penalty missed) Delfouneso

24 August 2021	Huddersfield Town (2)	1–2	Everton (1)	Huddersfield
19:45 BST	Lees 45'	Report	Iwobi 26'; Townsend 79'	Stadium: John Smith's Stadium; Attendance: 10,459; Referee: Matt Donohue

24 August 2021	Sheffield United (2)	2–1	Derby County (2)	Sheffield
19:45 BST	Freeman 53'; Sharp 76'	Report	Sibley 44'	Stadium: Bramall Lane; Attendance: 7,973; Referee: Anthony Backhouse

24 August 2021	Stoke City (2)	2–0	Doncaster Rovers (3)	Stoke-on-Trent
19:45 BST	Ince 38'; Surridge 48'	Report		Stadium: bet365 Stadium; Attendance: 6,193; Referee: Marc Edwards

24 August 2021	Shrewsbury Town (3)	0–2	Rochdale (4)	Shrewsbury
19:00 BST		Report	Beesley 68' (pen.); Cashman 75'	Stadium: Montgomery Waters Meadow; Attendance: 2,229; Referee: Scott Oldham

24 August 2021	Nottingham Forest (2)	0–4	Wolverhampton Wanderers (1)	West Bridgford
20:00 BST		Report	Saïss 58'; Podence 60'; Trincão 86'; Gibbs-White 88'	Stadium: City Ground; Attendance: 10,769; Referee: Andy Davies

24 August 2021	Morecambe (3)	2–4	Preston North End (2)	Morecambe
19:45 BST	O' Connor 45+4'; Stockton 61'	Report	Riis Jakobsen 7', 33'; Ledson 64'; Van den Berg 79'	Stadium: Mazuma Stadium; Attendance: 4,334; Referee: James Oldham

24 August 2021	Blackpool (2)	2–3	Sunderland (3)	Blackpool
19:45 BST	Lavery 9'; Bowler 87'	Report	O'Brien 12', 57', 90+1'	Stadium: Bloomfield Road; Attendance: 5,756; Referee: Peter Wright

24 August 2021	Leeds United (1)	3–0	Crewe Alexandra (3)	Beeston
19:45 BST	Phillips 79'; Harrison 85', 90'	Report		Stadium: Elland Road; Attendance: 34,154; Referee: Benjamin Speedie

24 August 2021	Barrow (4)	0–6	Aston Villa (1)	Barrow-in-Furness
19:45 BST		Report	Archer 10', 62', 88'; El Ghazi 24' (pen.), 45+2'; Guilbert 75'	Stadium: Progression Solicitors Stadium; Attendance: 5,349; Referee: Martin Coy

25 August 2021	Newcastle United (1)	0–0 (3–4 p)	Burnley (1)	Newcastle upon Tyne
19:45 BST		Report		Stadium: St James' Park; Attendance: 30,082; Referee: Oliver Langford
	Penalties
	Saint-Maximin (penalty missed); Willock (penalty scored); Joelinton (penalty scored); S. Longstaff (penalty scored); Almirón (penalty missed)		(penalty scored) Wood; (penalty scored) Barnes; (penalty scored) McNeil; (penalty missed) Brownhill; (penalty scored) Taylor

=== Southern section ===
24 August 2021	Brentford (1)	3–1	Forest Green Rovers (4)	Brentford
19:45 BST	Wissa 60'; Mbeumo 75'; Forss 86'	Report	Aitchison 8'	Stadium: Brentford Community Stadium; Attendance: 12,137; Referee: Will Finnie

24 August 2021	Millwall (2)	3–1	Cambridge United (3)	Bermondsey
19:45 BST	M. Wallace 39', 42'; Smith 54'	Report	Williams 33'	Stadium: The Den; Attendance: 4,005; Referee: Neil Hair

24 August 2021	Norwich City (1)	6–0	Bournemouth (2)	Norwich
19:00 BST	Tzolis 12', 66'; McLean 26'; Rupp 33'; Sargent 49', 75'	Report		Stadium: Carrow Road; Attendance: 20,090; Referee: Charles Breakspear

24 August 2021	Cardiff City (2)	0–2	Brighton & Hove Albion (1)	Cardiff
19:45 BST		Report	Moder 9'; Zeqiri 55'	Stadium: Cardiff City Stadium; Attendance: 6,013; Referee: James Bell

24 August 2021	Birmingham City (2)	0–2	Fulham (2)	Bordesley
19:45 BST		Report	Stansfield 26'; Robinson 90+2'	Stadium: St Andrew's; Attendance: 4,783; Referee: Sam Barrott

24 August 2021	Gillingham (3)	1–1 (4–5 p)	Cheltenham Town (3)	Gillingham
19:45 BST	Oliver 20'	Report	May 24'	Stadium: MEMS Priestfield Stadium; Attendance: 2,151; Referee: David Rock
	Penalties
	Lee (penalty scored); O'Keefe (penalty missed); Lloyd (penalty scored); Carayol (penalty scored); Adshead (penalty scored)		(penalty scored) Thomas; (penalty scored) Wright; (penalty scored) Lloyd; (penalty scored) Tozer; (penalty scored) Chapman

24 August 2021	Queens Park Rangers (2)	2–0	Oxford United (3)	White City
19:45 BST	Dickie 26'; Chambers-Parillon 40' (o.g.)	Report		Stadium: Kiyan Prince Foundation Stadium; Attendance: 8,154; Referee: Tom Nield

24 August 2021	Swansea City (2)	4–1	Plymouth Argyle (3)	Swansea
19:00 BST	Williams 29'; M. Whittaker 79', 86', 90'	Report	Shirley 63'	Stadium: Swansea.com Stadium; Attendance: 7,491; Referee: Robert Madley

24 August 2021	Stevenage (4)	2–2 (3–5 p)	Wycombe Wanderers (3)	Stevenage
19:45 BST	List 50'; Reid 77'	Report	Akinfenwa 23'; De Barr 90+4'	Stadium: Lamex Stadium; Attendance: 1,934; Referee: Declan Bourne
	Penalties
	Norris (penalty scored); James-Wildin (penalty missed); Reeves (penalty scored); Coker (penalty scored)		(penalty scored) Jacobson; (penalty scored) Horgan; (penalty scored) Pendlebury; (penalty scored) Mehmeti; (penalty scored) De Barr

24 August 2021	Northampton Town (4)	0–1	AFC Wimbledon (3)	Northampton
19:45 BST		Report	Hartigan 90+4'	Stadium: Sixfields Stadium; Attendance: 3,257; Referee: Ross Joyce

24 August 2021	Watford (1)	1–0	Crystal Palace (1)	Watford
19:45 BST	Fletcher 86'	Report		Stadium: Vicarage Road; Attendance: 9,011; Referee: Tim Robinson

25 August 2021	West Bromwich Albion (2)	0–6	Arsenal (1)	West Bromwich
20:00 BST		Report	Aubameyang 17', 45', 62'; Pépé 45+1'; Saka 50'; Lacazette 80'	Stadium: The Hawthorns; Attendance: 17,016; Referee: David Webb

25 August 2021	Newport County (4)	0–8	Southampton (1)	Newport
19:45 BST		Report	Broja 9', 57'; Tella 25'; Walker-Peters 44'; Elyounoussi 48', 55', 90+1'; Redmond 69'	Stadium: Rodney Parade; Attendance: 7,002; Referee: Darren Drysdale

== Third round ==
A total of 32 teams played in the third round. Chelsea, Leicester City, Liverpool, Manchester City, Manchester United, Tottenham Hotspur, and West Ham United entered in this round due to their participation in either the 2021–22 UEFA Champions League, the 2021–22 UEFA Europa League, or the 2021–22 UEFA Europa Conference League. The draw was made on 25 August 2021 live on Sky Sports after the conclusion of the second round tie between West Bromwich Albion vs Arsenal by Kevin Phillips and Kevin Campbell. Unlike the previous rounds this round was not split into northern and southern sections. Tiebreakers were decided by penalty.

Oldham Athletic and Rochdale were the lowest level teams that were still in the competition.

21 September 2021	Burnley (1)	4–1	Rochdale (4)	Burnley
19:45 BST	Rodriguez 50', 60', 62', 76'	Report	Beesley 47'	Stadium: Turf Moor; Attendance: 9,125; Referee: Geoff Eltringham

21 September 2021	Fulham (2)	0–0 (5–6 p)	Leeds United (1)	Fulham
19:45 BST		Report		Stadium: Craven Cottage; Attendance: 11,299; Referee: Tim Robinson
	Penalties
	Onomah (penalty missed); Cavaleiro (penalty scored); Kebano (penalty scored); Bryan (penalty missed); Hector (penalty scored); Mawson (penalty scored); De Cordova-Reid (penalty scored); Rodrigo Muniz (penalty missed)		(penalty scored) Rodrigo; (penalty scored) James; (penalty scored) Phillips; (penalty missed) Dallas; (penalty missed) Forshaw; (penalty scored) Firpo; (penalty scored) Gelhardt; (penalty scored) McKinstry

21 September 2021	Manchester City (1)	6–1	Wycombe Wanderers (3)	Manchester
19:45 BST	De Bruyne 29'; Mahrez 43', 83'; Foden 45+1'; Torres 71'; Palmer 88'	Report	Hanlan 22'	Stadium: Etihad Stadium; Attendance: 30,959; Referee: Robert Jones

21 September 2021	Norwich City (1)	0–3	Liverpool (1)	Norwich
19:45 BST		Report	Minamino 4', 80'; Origi 50'	Stadium: Carrow Road; Attendance: 26,353; Referee: Darren England

21 September 2021	Preston North End (2)	4–1	Cheltenham Town (3)	Preston
19:45 BST	Hughes 25'; Rafferty 37'; Maguire 82'; Riis Jakobsen 90+3'	Report	Vassell 56'	Stadium: Deepdale; Attendance: 6,561; Referee: Dean Whitestone

21 September 2021	Queens Park Rangers (2)	2–2 (8–7 p)	Everton (1)	White City
19:45 BST	Austin 18', 34'	Report	Digne 30'; Townsend 47'	Stadium: Kiyan Prince Foundation Stadium; Attendance: 12,888; Referee: Kevin Friend
	Penalties
	Austin (penalty scored); Ball (penalty scored); Barbet (penalty scored); Willock (penalty scored); Adomah (penalty scored); Duke-McKenna (penalty scored); Amos (penalty scored); Dunne (penalty scored)		(penalty scored) Holgate; (penalty scored) Keane; (penalty scored) Townsend; (penalty scored) Gray; (penalty scored) Gordon; (penalty scored) Doucouré; (penalty scored) Godfrey; (penalty missed) Davies

21 September 2021	Sheffield United (2)	2–2 (2–4 p)	Southampton (1)	Sheffield
19:45 BST	Stevens 8'; McBurnie 66'	Report	Diallo 23'; Salisu 53'	Stadium: Bramall Lane; Attendance: 8,934; Referee: John Brooks
	Penalties
	Norwood (penalty scored); Brewster (penalty missed); Osborn (penalty scored); McBurnie (penalty missed)		(penalty scored) Ward-Prowse; (penalty scored) Adams; (penalty missed) Broja; (penalty scored) Diallo; (penalty scored) Romeu

21 September 2021	Watford (1)	1–3	Stoke City (2)	Watford
19:45 BST	Fletcher 61'	Report	Powell 25'; Clucas 80'; Tymon 85'	Stadium: Vicarage Road; Attendance: 8,421; Referee: Tony Harrington

21 September 2021	Wigan Athletic (3)	0–2	Sunderland (3)	Wigan
19:45 BST		Report	Broadhead 26'; O'Nien 54'	Stadium: DW Stadium; Attendance: 6,511; Referee: Leigh Doughty

21 September 2021	Brentford (1)	7–0	Oldham Athletic (4)	Brentford
19:45 BST	Forss 3' (pen.), 16', 44', 60'; Wissa 38', 87'; Diarra 43' (o.g.)	Report		Stadium: Brentford Community Stadium; Attendance: 12,819; Referee: Simon Hooper

22 September 2021	Brighton & Hove Albion (1)	2–0	Swansea City (2)	Brighton
19:30 BST	Connolly 33', 38'	Report		Stadium: Falmer Stadium; Attendance: 8,838; Referee: Michael Salisbury

22 September 2021	Arsenal (1)	3–0	AFC Wimbledon (3)	Holloway
19:45 BST	Lacazette 11' (pen.); Smith Rowe 77'; Nketiah 80'	Report		Stadium: Emirates Stadium; Attendance: 56,276; Referee: Jarred Gillett

22 September 2021	Chelsea (1)	1–1 (4–3 p)	Aston Villa (1)	Fulham
19:45 BST	Werner 54'	Report	Archer 64'	Stadium: Stamford Bridge; Attendance: 35,892; Referee: Graham Scott
	Penalties
	Lukaku (penalty scored); Mount (penalty scored); Barkley (penalty scored); Chilwell (penalty missed); James (penalty scored)		(penalty scored) El Ghazi; (penalty missed) A. Young; (penalty missed) Nakamba; (penalty scored) Konsa; (penalty scored) Buendía

22 September 2021	Manchester United (1)	0–1	West Ham United (1)	Manchester
19:45 BST		Report	Lanzini 9'	Stadium: Old Trafford; Attendance: 72,568; Referee: Jonathan Moss

22 September 2021	Millwall (2)	0–2	Leicester City (1)	Bermondsey
19:45 BST		Report	Lookman 50'; Iheanacho 88'	Stadium: The Den; Attendance: 9,985; Referee: Andy Madley

22 September 2021	Wolverhampton Wanderers (1)	2–2 (2–3 p)	Tottenham Hotspur (1)	Wolverhampton
19:45 BST	Dendoncker 38'; Podence 58'	Report	Ndombele 14'; Kane 23'	Stadium: Molineux Stadium; Attendance: 28,798; Referee: Peter Bankes
	Penalties
	Hwang (penalty scored); Moutinho (penalty scored); Neves (penalty missed); Dendoncker (penalty missed); Coady (penalty missed)		(penalty scored) Kane; (penalty scored) Reguilón; (penalty scored) Gil; (penalty missed) Højbjerg

== Fourth round ==
A total of 16 teams played in this round. The ties were played during the week commencing 25 October 2021. League One side Sunderland were the only team from the third division or lower left in the competition.

26 October 2021	Chelsea (1)	1–1 (4–3 p)	Southampton (1)	Fulham
19:45 BST	Havertz 44'	Report	Adams 47'	Stadium: Stamford Bridge; Attendance: 39,766; Referee: Kevin Friend
	Penalties
	Alonso (penalty scored); Mount (penalty missed); Hudson-Odoi (penalty scored); Chilwell (penalty scored); James (penalty scored)		(penalty scored) Armstrong; (penalty missed) Walcott; (penalty scored) Long; (penalty missed) Smallbone; (penalty scored) Romeu

26 October 2021	Arsenal (1)	2–0	Leeds United (1)	Holloway
19:45 BST	Chambers 55'; Nketiah 69'	Report		Stadium: Emirates Stadium; Attendance: 59,126; Referee: Andre Marriner

26 October 2021	Queens Park Rangers (2)	0–0 (1–3 p)	Sunderland (3)	Shepherd's Bush
19:45 BST		Report		Stadium: Kiyan Prince Foundation Stadium; Attendance: 15,372; Referee: Keith Stroud
	Penalties
	Austin (penalty missed); Chair (penalty missed); Dykes (penalty scored); Barbet (penalty missed)		(penalty scored) McGeady; (penalty scored) Stewart; (penalty scored) Pritchard

27 October 2021	Stoke City (2)	1–2	Brentford (1)	Stoke-on-Trent
19:45 BST	Sawyers 57'	Report	Canós 22'; Toney 40'	Stadium: Bet365 Stadium; Attendance: 9,584; Referee: Michael Salisbury

27 October 2021	West Ham United (1)	0–0 (5–3 p)	Manchester City (1)	Stratford
19:45 BST		Report		Stadium: London Stadium; Attendance: 60,000; Referee: Jonathan Moss
	Penalties
	Noble (penalty scored); Bowen (penalty scored); Dawson (penalty scored); Cresswell (penalty scored); Benrahma (penalty scored)		(penalty missed) Foden; (penalty scored) Cancelo; (penalty scored) Gabriel Jesus; (penalty scored) Grealish

27 October 2021	Leicester City (1)	2–2 (4–2 p)	Brighton & Hove Albion (1)	Leicester
19:45 BST	Barnes 6'; Lookman 45+5'	Report	Webster 45+3'; Mwepu 71'	Stadium: King Power Stadium; Attendance: 21,163; Referee: Jarred Gillett
	Penalties
	Maddison (penalty scored); Barnes (penalty scored); Daka (penalty scored); Pereira (penalty scored)		(penalty scored) Groß; (penalty missed) Maupay; (penalty scored) Mac Allister; (penalty missed) Mwepu

27 October 2021	Burnley (1)	0–1	Tottenham Hotspur (1)	Burnley
19:45 BST		Report	Lucas 68'	Stadium: Turf Moor; Attendance: 14,637; Referee: Peter Bankes

27 October 2021	Preston North End (2)	0–2	Liverpool (1)	Preston
19:45 BST		Report	Minamino 62'; Origi 84'	Stadium: Deepdale; Attendance: 22,131; Referee: David Coote

== Quarter-finals ==
A total of eight teams played in this round. The draw was held on 30 October 2021. The ties were played during the week commencing 20 December 2021. League One side Sunderland were the only team from outside the Premier League left in the competition.

21 December 2021	Arsenal (1)	5–1	Sunderland (3)	Holloway
19:45 GMT	Nketiah 17', 49', 58'; Pépé 27'; Patino 90+1'	Report	Broadhead 31'	Stadium: Emirates Stadium; Attendance: 59,027; Referee: Robert Jones

22 December 2021	Brentford (1)	0–2	Chelsea (1)	Brentford
19:45 GMT		Report	Jansson 80' (o.g.); Jorginho 85' (pen.)	Stadium: Brentford Community Stadium; Attendance: 16,577; Referee: Andre Marriner

22 December 2021	Liverpool (1)	3–3 (5–4 p)	Leicester City (1)	Liverpool
19:45 GMT	Oxlade-Chamberlain 19'; Jota 68'; Minamino 90+5'	Report	Vardy 9', 13'; Maddison 33'	Stadium: Anfield; Attendance: 52,020; Referee: Andrew Madley
	Penalties
	Milner (penalty scored); Firmino (penalty scored); Oxlade-Chamberlain (penalty scored); Keïta (penalty scored); Minamino (penalty missed); Jota (penalty scored)		(penalty scored) Tielemans; (penalty scored) Maddison; (penalty scored) Albrighton; (penalty missed) Thomas; (penalty scored) Iheanacho; (penalty missed) Bertrand

22 December 2021	Tottenham Hotspur (1)	2–1	West Ham United (1)	Tottenham
19:45 GMT	Bergwijn 29'; Lucas 34'	Report	Bowen 32'	Stadium: Tottenham Hotspur Stadium; Attendance: 40,031; Referee: Chris Kavanagh

== Semi-finals ==
A total of four teams, all of which were from the Premier League, played in this round. The draw was held on 22 December 2021.

This season saw the return of double-legged semi-finals as with the 2019–20 EFL Cup after the 2020–21 EFL Cup semi-finals were played over a single leg due to fixture congestion caused by the COVID-19 pandemic. The first and second legs were originally scheduled to be played during the weeks commencing 3 January 2022 and 10 January 2022, respectively. However, on 5 January 2022, the EFL postponed the first-leg match between Arsenal and Liverpool, originally scheduled for 6 January 2022, to 13 January 2022, due to a COVID-19 outbreak among Liverpool's players and staff. This also led to a switch to Liverpool home for the first leg, and Arsenal home for the second leg on 20 January 2022.

5 January 2022
19:45 GMT

Chelsea (1)	2–0	Tottenham Hotspur (1)
Havertz 5'; Davies 34' (o.g.)	Report

Stamford Bridge, London
Attendance: 37,868
Referee: Craig Pawson
12 January 2022
19:45 GMT

Tottenham Hotspur (1)	0–1	Chelsea (1)
	Report	Rüdiger 18'

Tottenham Hotspur Stadium, London
Attendance: 45,603
Referee: Andre Marriner

Chelsea won 3–0 on aggregate.

13 January 2022
19:45 GMT

Liverpool (1)	0–0	Arsenal (1)
	Report

Anfield, Liverpool
Attendance: 52,377
Referee: Michael Oliver
20 January 2022
19:45 GMT

Arsenal (1)	0–2	Liverpool (1)
	Report	Jota 19', 77'

Emirates Stadium, London
Attendance: 59,360
Referee: Martin Atkinson

Liverpool won 2–0 on aggregate.

== Final ==
Chelsea played Liverpool in the final, which was held on 27 February 2022. This saw the return of the EFL Cup Final to its February slot as with the 2020 EFL Cup Final, as the 2021 EFL Cup Final was played in April so that spectators could attend due to COVID-19 restrictions in England. It was played at Wembley Stadium in Wembley in the London Borough of Brent. The winner qualifies for the 2022–23 UEFA Europa Conference League unless they have qualified for the 2022–23 UEFA Champions League or 2022–23 UEFA Europa League.

27 February 2022
16:30 GMT

Chelsea	0–0 (a.e.t.)	Liverpool
	Report
Penalties
Alonso (penalty scored); Lukaku (penalty scored); Havertz (penalty scored); James (penalty scored); Jorginho (penalty scored); Rüdiger (penalty scored); Kanté (penalty scored); Werner (penalty scored); Silva (penalty scored); Chalobah (penalty scored); Arrizabalaga (penalty missed)	10–11	(penalty scored) Milner; (penalty scored) Fabinho; (penalty scored) Van Dijk; (penalty scored) Alexander-Arnold; (penalty scored) Salah; (penalty scored) Jota; (penalty scored) Origi; (penalty scored) Robertson; (penalty scored) Elliott; (penalty scored) Konaté; (penalty scored) Kelleher

Wembley Stadium, London
Attendance: 85,512
Referee: Stuart Attwell (Warwickshire)

== Top goalscorers ==
Rank	Player	Club	Goals
1	(Finland) Marcus Forss	Brentford	5
1	(England) Eddie Nketiah	Arsenal	5
3	(England) Cameron Archer	Aston Villa	4
3	(Japan) Takumi Minamino	Liverpool	4
3	(Republic of Ireland) Aiden O'Brien	Sunderland	4
3	(Denmark) Emil Riis Jakobsen	Preston North End	4
3	(England) Jay Rodriguez	Burnley	4
8	(Gabon) Pierre-Emerick Aubameyang	Arsenal	3
8	(Norway) Mohamed Elyounoussi	Southampton	3
8	(Portugal) Diogo Jota	Liverpool	3
8	(England) Morgan Whittaker	Swansea City	3
8	(Democratic Republic of the Congo) Yoane Wissa	Brentford	3
