= 2021–22 Oldham Athletic A.F.C. season =

Oldham Athletic A.F.C.
2021–22 season
- Chairman: Abdallah Lemsagam
- Head Coach: Keith Curle (until 24 November 2021); John Sheridan (from 22 January)
- Stadium: Boundary Park
- League Two: 23rd (relegated)
- FA Cup: First round
- EFL Cup: Third round
- EFL Trophy: Third round
- Top goalscorer: League: Davis Keillor-Dunn (15); All: Davis Keillor-Dunn (17)
Home colours	Away colours	Third colours

The 2021–22 season is Oldham Athletic's 127th year in their history and fourth consecutive season in League Two. Along with the league, the club will also compete in the FA Cup, the EFL Cup and the EFL Trophy. The season covers the period from 1 July 2021 to 30 June 2022. It was the most disastrous season in the club's history, which resulted in relegation and loss of English Football League status after 115 years.

== Players ==
=== Squad at the end of the season ===
As of 7 May 2022

No	Pos	Nat	Name	Age	Debut	Apps	Starts	Subs	Goals	Yellow card	(yellow card) (yellow-red card)	Red card	Notes
1	GK	(Canada)	Jayson Leutwiler	33	28 Aug 2021	29	29	0	0	1	0	0	
2	DF	(England)	Jordan Clarke	30	7 Aug 2021	46	46	0	1	9	1	0	
3	DF	(England)	Sam Hart	25	7 Aug 2021	35	33	2	1	10	0	0	Released at the end of the season
4	MF	(Mali)	Ousseynou Cissé	31	7 Aug 2021	11	11	0	0	2	0	0	Released at the end of the season
5	DF	(England)	Harrison McGahey	26	25 Sep 2021	30	30	0	1	5	0	0	
6	DF	(England)	Carl Piergianni	30	11 Jan 2020	104	102	2	9	22	0	1	Released at the end of the season
7	MF	(Wales)	Nicky Adams	35	23 Jan 2021	67	55	12	0	6	0	0	Released at the end of the season
8	MF	(England)	Callum Whelan	23	5 Sep 2020	89	74	15	1	9	0	0	Released at the end of the season
9	FW	(Barbados)	Hallam Hope	28	14 Aug 2021	46	33	13	5	5	0	0	
10	FW	(England)	Davis Keillor-Dunn	24	5 Sep 2020	105	90	15	28	4	0	0	Released at the end of the season
11	FW	(Cameroon)	Mike Fondop	28	5 Feb 2022	2	1	1	2	0	0	0	
14	MF	(France)	Dylan Fage	23	7 Aug 2019	79	55	24	1	5	0	1	Released at the end of the season
15	DF	(England)	Kyle Jameson	23	17 Oct 2020	42	31	11	2	4	0	1	Released at the end of the season
17	MF	(England)	Jack Stobbs	25	7 Aug 2021	33	20	13	2	6	0	0	
19	FW	(England)	Vani Da Silva	19	5 Sep 2020	8	1	7	0	1	0	0	
22	DF	(France)	Raphaël Diarra	26	10 Nov 2020	36	25	11	0	9	0	0	Released at the end of the season
23	GK	(Republic of Ireland)	Danny Rogers	28	7 Aug 2021	24	24	0	0	1	0	0	Released at the end of the season
24	FW	(Republic of the Congo)	Dylan Bahamboula	26	3 Oct 2020	81	64	17	11	6	0	1	Released at the end of the season
26	MF	(England)	Alex Hunt	21	22 Jan 2022	13	7	6	0	1	0	0	Loan ended at end of season
27	MF	(England)	Jamie Hopcutt	29	14 Aug 2021	19	7	12	1	1	0	0	Released at the end of the season
28	MF	(Republic of the Congo)	Christopher Missilou	29	4 Aug 2018	104	95	9	6	15	0	0	Released at the end of the season
29	FW	(England)	Junior Luamba	19	29 Dec 2020	21	12	9	2	2	0	0	
30	FW	(England)	Tope Obadeyi	32	4 Feb 2017	50	26	24	5	0	0	0	Released at the end of the season
32	DF	(England)	Will Sutton	19	10 Nov 2020	11	10	1	2	3	0	0	
33	DF	(Portugal)	Benny Couto	18	31 Aug 2021	27	22	5	1	1	0	0	
34	MF	(Republic of Ireland)	Harry Vaughan	18	23 Feb 2021	36	11	25	2	1	0	0	
38	DF	(Republic of Ireland)	Trey Turner	18	4 Jan 2022	1	1	0	0	0	0	0	
39	MF	(England)	Isaac Modi	18	30 Oct 2021	2	0	2	0	0	0	0	
40	GK	(Wales)	Luke Southerington	17									

=== Left the club during the season ===
No	Pos	Nat	Name	Age	Debut	Apps	Starts	Subs	Goals	Yellow card	(yellow card) (yellow-red card)	Red card	Notes
11	FW	(England)	Zak Dearnley	23	9 Feb 2019	55	29	26	15	0	0	0	Left by mutual consent on 27/01/22
18	MF	(England)	Jamie Bowden	20	7 Aug 2021	25	20	5	1	6	0	0	Loan ended on 10/01/22
20	DF	(Italy)	Andrea Badan	24	15 Sep 2020	20	13	7	0	4	0	0	Left by mutual consent on 31/08/21
25	FW	(England)	Jacob Blyth	29	7 Aug 2021	4	2	2	0	1	0	0	Left by mutual consent on 28/08/21
26	MF	(England)	Faysal Bettache	21	21 Aug 2021	13	8	5	0	0	0	0	Loan ended on 10/12/21
37	GK	(England)	Laurie Walker	32	13 Mar 2021	16	16	0	0	1	0	0	Loan ended on 28/08/21
44	DF	(Republic of Ireland)	Alan Sheehan	35	1 Sep 2009	15	14	1	1	2	0	0	Left on 24/11/21

== Pre-season friendlies ==
Oldham Athletic announced pre-season friendlies against Ashton United, Stalybridge Celtic, Wigan Athletic, Burnley, Crewe Alexandra and Huddersfield Town as part of their preparations for the new campaign.

10 July 2021 Friendly	Ashton United	1–2	Oldham Athletic	Ashton-under-Lyne
15:00 BST	Redshaw 43'	Report	Trialist 3'; Dearnley 82'	Stadium: Hurst Cross

13 July 2021 Friendly	Stalybridge Celtic	0–2	Oldham Athletic	Stalybridge
19:00 BST		Report	Trialist 29'; Trialist 63'	Stadium: Bower Fold

17 July 2021 Friendly	Oldham Athletic	1–2	Wigan Athletic	Oldham
15:00 BST	Hope 31'	Report	Edwards 8'; Lang 14'	Stadium: Boundary Park; Attendance: 0 (Behind-closed-doors)

24 July 2021 Friendly	Oldham Athletic	0–2	Burnley	Oldham
13:00 BST		Report	Rodriguez 55'; Richardson 58'	Stadium: Boundary Park; Attendance: 2,071

27 July 2021 Friendly	Oldham Athletic	2–1	Crewe Alexandra	Oldham
19:00 BST	Hart 12', 28'	Report	Kirk 22'	Stadium: Boundary Park; Attendance: 799

30 July 2021 Friendly	Rochdale	5–1	Oldham Athletic	Spotland
14:00 BST	Morley 49'; McNulty 55'; Hart 64' (o.g.); Beesley 66'; Done 76'	Report	Trialist 79'	Stadium: Crown Oil Arena; Attendance: 0 (Behind-closed-doors)

31 July 2021 Friendly	Huddersfield Town	Cancelled	Oldham Athletic	Huddersfield
16:30 BST				Stadium: John Smith's Stadium
Note: Cancelled due to Huddersfield Town's EFL Cup involvement.

== Competitions ==
=== League Two ===
==== League table ====
Pos	Team	Pld	W	D	L	GF	GA	GD	Pts	Promotion, qualification or relegation
19	Harrogate Town	46	14	11	21	64	75	−11	53	
20	Carlisle United	46	14	11	21	39	62	−23	53	
21	Stevenage	46	11	14	21	45	68	−23	47	
22	Barrow	46	10	14	22	44	57	−13	44	
23	Oldham Athletic (R)	46	9	11	26	46	75	−29	38	Relegation to National League
24	Scunthorpe United (R)	46	4	14	28	29	90	−61	26	Relegation to National League

Source: EFL Official Website
Rules for classification: 1) Points; 2) Goal difference; 3) Number of goals scored; 4) Head-to-head results; 5) Wins; 6) Away goals; 7) Penalty points (sec 9.5); 8) 12-point sending off offences
(R) Relegated

==== Results summary ====
Overall								Home						Away					
Pld	W	D	L	GF	GA	GD	Pts	W	D	L	GF	GA	GD	W	D	L	GF	GA	GD
46	9	11	26	46	75	−29	38	5	4	14	29	42	−13	4	7	12	17	33	−16

Last updated: 7 May 2022.

==== Results by matchday ====
Matchday	1	2	3	4	5	6	7	8	9	10	11	12	13	14	15	16	17	18	19	20	21	22	23	24	25	26	27	28	29	30	31	32	33	34	35	36	37	38	39	40	41	42	43	44	45	46
Ground	H	A	A	H	A	H	A	H	A	H	A	H	H	A	H	A	H	A	A	H	H	H	A	A	A	H	A	H	A	H	A	A	H	A	A	H	H	H	H	A	A	H	A	H	A	H
Result	L	L	L	L	W	L	L	D	W	L	D	W	L	D	L	L	W	L	L	L	D	L	D	D	L	D	W	W	D	W	D	D	L	L	L	L	L	L	W	W	L	L	L	L	L	D
Position	21	22	24	24	23	23	24	24	24	23	23	21	22	21	22	23	22	22	23	23	23	24	24	24	24	23	23	23	23	22	23	23	23	23	23	23	23	23	22	22	22	23	23	23	23	23

Updated to match(es) played on 7 May 2022. Source: Statto.com
A = Away; H = Home; W = Win; D = Draw; L = Loss

==== Matches ====
Oldham's fixtures were announced on 24 June 2021.

7 August 2021 1	Oldham Athletic	0–1	Newport County	Oldham
15:00 BST		Report	88' Ellison	Stadium: Boundary Park; Attendance: 4,094; Referee: Tom Nield

14 August 2021 2	Bradford City	2–1	Oldham Athletic	Bradford
15:00 BST	Angol 32', (yellow card) 88', (goal) 90+8' (pen.); Watt (yellow card) 64'; Cooke (yellow card) 65'	Report	Piergianni (yellow card) 35'; Hart (yellow card) 66'; Bahamboula 90+2', (yellow card) 90+3'	Stadium: Utilita Energy Stadium; Attendance: 17,624; Referee: Steve Martin

17 August 2021 3	Bristol Rovers	1–0	Oldham Athletic	Horfield
19:45 BST	Saunders (yellow card) 22', (goal) 35'; Pitman (yellow card) 90+1'	Report	Whelan (yellow card) 4'; Diarra (yellow card) 47'; Cissé (yellow card) 73'	Stadium: Memorial Stadium; Attendance: 6,005; Referee: Sam Purkiss

21 August 2021 4	Oldham Athletic	1–2	Colchester United	Oldham
15:00 BST	Hope (yellow card) 63'; Sheehan (yellow card) 68'; Bahamboula 73'; Diarra (yellow card) 90+5'	Report	Sears 9' (pen.); Chilvers 12'	Stadium: Boundary Park; Attendance: 3,496; Referee: Sam Barrott

28 August 2021 5	Sutton United	1–2	Oldham Athletic	Sutton
15:00 BST	Ajiboye (yellow card) 51', (goal) 62'; Eastmond (yellow card) 80'	Report	Diarra (yellow card) 39'; Piergianni (yellow card) 73', (goal) 88'; Luamba (yellow card) 90+5', (goal) 90+6'	Stadium: VBS Community Stadium; Attendance: 3,262; Referee: Darren Drysdale

4 September 2021 6	Oldham Athletic	0–3	Barrow	Oldham
15:00 BST		Report	Banks 15'; Grayson (yellow card) 34', (goal) 57'; Zanzala 53'	Stadium: Boundary Park; Attendance: 4,232; Referee: Carl Boyeson

11 September 2021 7	Leyton Orient	4–0	Oldham Athletic	London
15:00 BST	James (yellow card) 13', (goal) 27'; Drinan 16'; Archibald 75'; Smith 90+1'	Report	Bowden (yellow card) 25'; Jameson (yellow card) 90+5'	Stadium: Brisbane Road; Attendance: 5,315; Referee: Ben Toner

18 September 2021 8	Oldham Athletic	0–0	Hartlepool United	Oldham
15:00 BST	Jameson (yellow card) 80'; Piergianni (yellow card) 87'	Report	Ferguson (yellow card) 42'; Liddle (yellow card) 73'; Sterry (yellow card) 90+3'	Stadium: Boundary Park; Attendance: 3,934; Referee: Charles Breakspear

25 September 2021 9	Rochdale	0–1	Oldham Athletic	Spotland
15:00 BST	O'Connell (yellow card) 35'	Report	Keillor-Dunn 59'; Whelan (yellow card) 89'	Stadium: Crown Oil Arena; Attendance: 5,234; Referee: Will Finnie

2 October 2021 10	Oldham Athletic	1–2	Harrogate Town	Oldham
15:00 BST	Vaughan 76'	Report	Diamond 29'; Kerry (yellow card) 60'; Armstrong 66'	Stadium: Boundary Park; Attendance: 3,729; Referee: David Rock

9 October 2021 11	Mansfield Town	0–0	Oldham Athletic	Mansfield
15:00 BST	Clarke (yellow card) 38'; Lapslie (yellow card) 76'; Burke (yellow card) 90+2'	Report	Stobbs (yellow card) 37'; Clarke (yellow card) 86'	Stadium: One Call Stadium; Attendance: 4,556; Referee: Craig Hicks

16 October 2021 12	Oldham Athletic	3–0	Stevenage	Oldham
15:00 BST	Keillor-Dunn 6', 17'; Bowden (yellow card) 38'; Bahamboula 58'; Piergianni (yellow card) 90+1'	Report		Stadium: Boundary Park; Attendance: 3,492; Referee: Bobby Madley

19 October 2021 13	Oldham Athletic	1–3	Walsall	Oldham
19:45 GMT	Bowden (yellow card) 27'; Hope 67'; Whelan (yellow card) 76'	Report	Labadie (yellow card) 9'; Earing 33'; Miller 43'; Osadebe 85'	Stadium: Boundary Park; Attendance: 3,762; Referee: Ross Joyce

24 October 2021 14	Carlisle United	0–0	Oldham Athletic	Carlisle
15:00 BST		Report	Couto (yellow card) 31'	Stadium: Brunton Park; Attendance: 4,274; Referee: Ben Speedie

30 October 2021 15	Oldham Athletic	1–3	Swindon Town	Oldham
15:00 BST	Bowden (yellow card) 26'; Piergianni 90'	Report	McKirdy 32', (yellow card) 71'; Iandolo (yellow card) 36'; Simpson 79', 90+4'	Stadium: Boundary Park; Attendance: 4,085; Referee: Anthony Backhouse

13 November 2021 16	Exeter City	2–1	Oldham Athletic	Exeter
15:00 GMT	Jay 17'; Brown 50'; Key (yellow card) 64'; Sweeney (yellow card) 73'; Atangana (yellow card) 90+3'	Report	Bowden (yellow card) 24', (goal) 84'	Stadium: St James Park; Attendance: 5,103; Referee: Ollie Yates

20 November 2021 17	Oldham Athletic	3–2	Port Vale	Oldham
15:00 GMT	Keillor-Dunn 31'; Piergianni (yellow card) 42'; Hart (yellow card) 65', (goal) 81'; Whelan (yellow card) 76'; Martin 90+3' (o.g.)	Report	Worrall 20'; Gibbons 52'; Garrity (yellow card) 67'	Stadium: Boundary Park; Attendance: 6,080; Referee: Carl Brook

23 November 2021 18	Northampton Town	2–1	Oldham Athletic	Sixfields
19:45 GMT	Guthrie 14'; Etete 38'; McWilliams (yellow card) 90+5'	Report	Piergianni (yellow card) 45+2', (goal) 54'; McGahey (yellow card) 90+5'	Stadium: PTS Academy Stadium; Attendance: 4,059; Referee: Brett Huxtable

27 November 2021 19	Salford City	2–0	Oldham Athletic	Salford
15:00 GMT	Eastham (yellow card) 2'; Lund 45+1'; Thomas-Asante 77', (yellow card) 90+2'; Turnbull (yellow card) 80'	Report	Hart (yellow card) 45'; Hope (yellow card) 79'; Stobbs (yellow card) 87'	Stadium: Peninsula Stadium; Attendance: 3,242; Referee: Paul Howard

7 December 2021 20	Oldham Athletic	0–1	Tranmere Rovers	Oldham
19:45 GMT		Report	Jolley 90'	Stadium: Boundary Park; Attendance: 4,303; Referee: Andy Haines

11 December 2021 21	Oldham Athletic	5–5	Forest Green Rovers	Oldham
15:00 GMT	Keillor-Dunn 11', 59'; Bowden (yellow card) 47'; Hope 55'; Stobbs 65', (yellow card) 90+6'; Clarke (yellow card) 71'; Wilson 78' (o.g.)	Report	Aitchison 13'; Matt 27', 44'; Stevens 48', 63'	Stadium: Boundary Park; Attendance: 3,621; Referee: Andrew Kitchen

27 December 2021 22	Oldham Athletic	1–3	Scunthorpe United	Oldham
15:00 GMT	Couto 12'	Report	Hackney (yellow card) 8'; Loft 51', 77'; Pugh (yellow card) 57'; Hippolyte 74'	Stadium: Boundary Park; Attendance: 4,693; Referee: Seb Stockbridge

29 December 2021 23	Barrow	0–0	Oldham Athletic	Barrow-in-Furness
19:45 GMT	Brown (yellow card) 54'	Report	McGahey (yellow card) 66'; Leutwiler (yellow card) 90+6'	Stadium: The Dune Hotel Stadium; Attendance: 3,495; Referee: Ben Speedie

1 January 2022 24	Hartlepool United	0–0	Oldham Athletic	Hartlepool
15:00 GMT		Report	McGahey (yellow card) 6'; Clarke (yellow card) 38'; Hart (yellow card) 45+3'; Diarra (yellow card) 73'	Stadium: Suit Direct Stadium; Attendance: 5,026; Referee: Darren Handley

22 January 2022 25	Harrogate Town	3–0	Oldham Athletic	Harrogate
15:00 GMT	Muldoon 17', 73', 89'; Diarra (yellow card) 63'	Report	Stobbs (yellow card) 81'	Stadium: EnviroVent Stadium; Attendance: 2,689; Referee: Tom Reeves

29 January 2022 26	Oldham Athletic	0–0	Rochdale	Oldham
15:00 GMT	Hunt (yellow card) 8'; Hart (yellow card) 51'; Piergianni (yellow card) 57'	Report	O'Keeffe (yellow card) 51'; O'Connell (yellow card) 88'	Stadium: Boundary Park; Attendance: 8,199; Referee: Darren Drysdale

5 February 2022 27	Scunthorpe United	0–1	Oldham Athletic	Scunthorpe
15:00 GMT	Lewis (yellow card) 45+4'; Beestin (yellow card) 49'; Grant (yellow card) 73'; Pugh (yellow card) 79'	Report	Hart (yellow card) 32'; Luamba 83', (yellow card) 90'; Adams (yellow card) 90'	Stadium: Sands Venue Stadium; Attendance: 5,014; Referee: Neil Hair

8 February 2022 28	Oldham Athletic	2–1	Bristol Rovers	Oldham
19:45 GMT	Keillor-Dunn 1', 31'; Clarke (yellow card) 88'	Report	Nicholson 43'; Anderton (yellow card) 52'; Coutts (yellow card) 64'	Stadium: Boundary Park; Attendance: 5,147; Referee: Scott Oldham

12 February 2022 29	Newport County	3–3	Oldham Athletic	Newport
15:00 GMT	Bennett (yellow card) 11'; Haynes 14'; Telford 40'; Demetriou 89'	Report	Hart (yellow card) 7'; Keillor-Dunn 28'; Bahamboula (yellow card) 29' (yellow-red card) 69'; Fondop 49', 82'; Missilou (yellow card) 66'	Stadium: Rodney Parade; Attendance: 3,901; Referee: Robert Lewis

19 February 2022 30	Oldham Athletic	2–0	Bradford City	Oldham
15:00 GMT	Hope 19', (yellow card) 72'; Keillor-Dunn 24'	Report	Watt (yellow card) 47'; O'Connor (red card) 71'	Stadium: Boundary Park; Attendance: 7,716; Referee: Anthony Backhouse

26 February 2022 31	Colchester United	1–1	Oldham Athletic	Colchester
15:00 GMT	Clarke 52' (o.g.); Sears (yellow card) 90+1'	Report	Keillor-Dunn 19'; Stobbs (yellow card) 24'	Stadium: JobServe Community Stadium; Attendance: 2,983; Referee: Andy Haines

1 March 2022 32	Crawley Town	2–2	Oldham Athletic	Crawley
19:45 GMT	Nadesan 58', 61'; Nichols (yellow card) 76'; Davies (yellow card) 86'	Report	Hope 56'; Missilou 70'	Stadium: The People's Pension Stadium; Attendance: 1,927; Referee: Alan Young

5 March 2022 33	Oldham Athletic	1–2	Carlisle United	Oldham
15:00 GMT	Missilou (yellow card) 27'; Bahamboula (yellow card) 27'; Keillor-Dunn (penalty missed) 28'; Hope (yellow card) 36', (goal) 45+4'; Adams (yellow card) 36'	Report	Simeu (yellow card) 26'; Mellish (yellow card) 27'; Patrick 48'; Feeney 90+4', (yellow card) 90+5'	Stadium: Boundary Park; Attendance: 7,327; Referee: Sam Allison

12 March 2022 34	Swindon Town	1–0	Oldham Athletic	Swindon
15:00 GMT	Hunt (yellow card) 45'; Aguiar (yellow card) 76'; Conroy 90+6'	Report	Hart (yellow card) 24'; Clarke (yellow card) 27' (yellow-red card) 90+1'; Adams (yellow card) 33'; Piergianni (yellow card) 42'; Fage (yellow card) 74'; Hope (yellow card) 83'; Stobbs (yellow card) 90+5'	Stadium: The Energy Check County Ground; Attendance: 11,390; Referee: David Rock

15 March 2022 35	Walsall	2–1	Oldham Athletic	Bescot
19:45 GMT	Osadebe 32'; Labadie (yellow card) 61'; Wilkinson 73', (yellow card) 89'; Rushworth (yellow card) 90+3'	Report	Sutton 21', (yellow card) 82'; Piergianni (yellow card) 75'	Stadium: Banks's Stadium; Attendance: 4,339; Referee: Ollie Yates

19 March 2022 36	Oldham Athletic	0–2	Exeter City	Oldham
15:00 GMT	Hart (yellow card) 45+1', (penalty missed) 73'; Clarke (yellow card) 63'	Report	Dieng (yellow card) 14'; Taylor 52'; Collins (yellow card) 69'; Atangana (yellow card) 71' (yellow-red card) 90+2'; Brown 90+6'	Stadium: Boundary Park; Attendance: 5,111; Referee: Seb Stockbridge

22 March 2022 37	Oldham Athletic	1–3	Sutton United	Oldham
19:45 GMT	Sutton 81'	Report	Korboa 20', 49'; Beautyman 77' (pen.)	Stadium: Boundary Park; Attendance: 4,624; Referee: Marc Edwards

26 March 2022 38	Oldham Athletic	1–2	Mansfield Town	Oldham
15:00 GMT	Keillor-Dunn 24'; Whelan (yellow card) 73'; Rogers (yellow card) 84'	Report	Oates 53'; Perch (yellow card) 69'; Lapslie 90+5'	Stadium: Boundary Park; Attendance: 6,045; Referee: Ben Toner

29 March 2022 39	Oldham Athletic	2–0	Leyton Orient	Oldham
19:45 GMT	Ray 33' (o.g.); Whelan 90+5'	Report	Kyprianou (yellow card) 52'; Pratley (yellow card) 88'	Stadium: Boundary Park; Attendance: 4,619; Referee: Chris Sarginson

2 April 2022 40	Stevenage	0–1	Oldham Athletic	Stevenage
15:00 BST	James-Wildin (yellow card) 45+2'; Coker (yellow card) 90+4'	Report	Hopcutt 16'; Clarke (yellow card) 49'; Adams (yellow card) 68'	Stadium: The Lamex Stadium; Attendance: 4,642; Referee: Andy Davies

9 April 2022 41	Port Vale	3–2	Oldham Athletic	Burslem
15:00 BST	Proctor 10', 34'; Stone (yellow card) 36'; Garrity (yellow card) 44'; Walker 54'; Harratt (yellow card) 78'	Report	Missilou 16'; Keillor-Dunn 45+1'	Stadium: Vale Park; Attendance: 8,384; Referee: Will Finnie

15 April 2022 42	Oldham Athletic	0–2	Northampton Town	Oldham
15:00 BST	Piergianni (red card) 88'; Jameson (yellow card) 90'	Report	Guthrie 44'; Sowerby (yellow card) 64'; Appéré 66'; Rose (yellow card) 84'; Hoskins (yellow card) 90'; Koiki (yellow card) 90'	Stadium: Boundary Park; Attendance: 5,789; Referee: Sam Purkiss

18 April 2022 43	Forest Green Rovers	2–0	Oldham Athletic	Nailsworth
15:00 BST	Hendry 8'; Matt 41'; Adams (yellow card) 79'	Report	Hopcutt (yellow card) 28'; Sutton (yellow card) 37'; Whelan (yellow card) 73'; Missilou (penalty missed) 80'	Stadium: The Fully Charged New Lawn; Attendance: 3,137; Referee: Steve Martin

23 April 2022 44	Oldham Athletic	1–2	Salford City	Oldham
15:00 BST	Keillor-Dunn 33' (pen.)	Report	Smith 8'; Turnbull (yellow card) 32'; Thomas-Asante 45+3', (yellow card) 78'	Stadium: Boundary Park; Attendance: 5,752; Referee: Bobby Madley

30 April 2022 45	Tranmere Rovers	2–0	Oldham Athletic	Birkenhead
15:00 BST	Hawkes 27'; Warrington (yellow card) 57'; Hemmings 62'; O'Connor (yellow card) 68'	Report		Stadium: Prenton Park; Attendance: 8,008; Referee: Neil Hair

7 May 2022 46	Oldham Athletic	3–3	Crawley Town	Oldham
12:30 BST	Stobbs 26'; Keillor-Dunn 28'; Clarke 60'	Report	Francomb 39'; Tilley 44'; Ferry (yellow card) 55'; Oteh 69'	Stadium: Boundary Park; Attendance: 4,591; Referee: Anthony Backhouse

=== FA Cup ===
Oldham were drawn away to Ipswich Town in the first round.

6 November 2021 First round	Ipswich Town	1–1	Oldham Athletic	Ipswich
15:00 GMT	Burns 8'; Morsy (yellow card) 34'; Donacien (yellow card) 54'	Report	Keillor-Dunn 41'; Bahamboula (penalty missed) 55', (yellow card) 62'; McGahey (yellow card) 60'	Stadium: Portman Road; Attendance: 8,845; Referee: Neil Hair

16 November 2021 First round replay	Oldham Athletic	1–2	Ipswich Town	Oldham
19:45 GMT	Clarke (yellow card) 22'; McGahey 29'; Keillor-Dunn (yellow card) 59'	Report	Woolfenden (yellow card) 27'; Chaplin 36'; El Mizouni 81'	Stadium: Boundary Park; Attendance: 2,801; Referee: Carl Boyeson

=== EFL Cup ===
Oldham Athletic were drawn at home to Tranmere Rovers in the first round, Accrington Stanley in the second round and away to Brentford in the third round.

10 August 2021 First round	Oldham Athletic	2–2 (4–3 p)	Tranmere Rovers	Oldham
19:45 BST	Keillor-Dunn (yellow card) 55'; Bahamboula 59'; Davies 68' (o.g.)	Report	Foley 40', (yellow card) 62'; Nevitt 51'	Stadium: Boundary Park; Attendance: 2,684; Referee: Scott Oldham
	Penalties
	Hart (penalty scored); Keillor-Dunn (penalty scored); Jameson (penalty missed); Stobbs (penalty scored); Adams (penalty scored)		Spearing (penalty scored); Glatzel (penalty missed); Morris (penalty scored); Clarke (penalty missed); Dieseruvwe (penalty scored)

24 August 2021 Second round	Oldham Athletic	0–0 (5–4 p)	Accrington Stanley	Oldham
19:00 BST		Report	Nolan (yellow card) 88'; Procter (yellow card) 90+5'	Stadium: Boundary Park; Attendance: 2,362; Referee: Seb Stockbridge
	Penalties
	Hart (penalty scored); Keillor-Dunn (penalty scored); Bahamboula (penalty scored); Whelan (penalty scored); Adams (penalty missed); Luamba (penalty scored)		Sykes (penalty scored); Charles (penalty missed); Morgan (penalty scored); Savin (penalty scored); Leigh (penalty scored); Butcher (penalty missed)

21 September 2021 Third round	Brentford	7–0	Oldham Athletic	Brentford
19:45 BST	Forss 3' (pen.), 16', 44', 60'; Wissa 38', 87'; Diarra 43' (o.g.)	Report	Clarke (yellow card) 79'	Stadium: Brentford Community Stadium; Attendance: 12,819; Referee: Simon Hooper

=== EFL Trophy ===
The Latics were drawn into Northern Group B alongside Leeds United U21s, Salford City and Tranmere Rovers. The group stage fixture dates were confirmed on 7 July. In the knock-out stages, Oldham were drawn at home to Wigan Athletic in the third round.

Pos	Div	Team	Pld	W	PW	PL	L	GF	GA	GD	Pts	Qualification
1	L2	Tranmere Rovers	3	3	0	0	0	9	3	+6	9	Advance to Round 2
2	L2	Oldham Athletic	3	1	0	0	2	5	6	−1	3	Advance to Round 2
3	L2	Salford City	3	1	0	0	2	5	6	−1	3	
4	ACA	Leeds United U21	3	1	0	0	2	7	11	−4	3	

Source: EFL.com

31 August 2021 Group game 1	Oldham Athletic	1–0	Salford City	Oldham
19:00 BST	Piergianni 43'	Report	Denny (yellow card) 52'; Sargent (yellow card) 60'	Stadium: Boundary Park; Attendance: 1,915; Referee: James Oldham

28 September 2021 Group game 2	Oldham Athletic	2–3	Leeds United U21	Oldham
19:00 BST	Diarra (yellow card) 55'; Dearnley 78'; Keillor-Dunn 90+3'	Report	Summerville 42' (pen.); McGahey 58' (o.g.); Jameson 80' (o.g.)	Stadium: Boundary Park; Attendance: 732; Referee: Andrew Kitchen

9 November 2021 Group game 3	Tranmere Rovers	3–2	Oldham Athletic	Birkenhead
19:00 GMT	Glatzel 45+2', 75'; Maynard 55'	Report	Dearnley 15', 43'; Clarke (yellow card) 41'	Stadium: Prenton Park; Attendance: 1,405; Referee: Marc Edwards

1 December 2021 Round 2	Sunderland	0–1	Oldham Athletic	Sunderland
19:00 GMT		Report	Piergianni (yellow card) 16'; Adams (yellow card) 27'; Vaughan 53'; Clarke (yellow card) 78'	Stadium: Stadium of Light; Attendance: 3,498; Referee: Tom Reeves

4 January 2022 Third round	Oldham Athletic	0–6	Wigan Athletic	Oldham
19:00 GMT	Cissé (yellow card) 35'	Report	Naylor 28'; Keane 34'; Power 36'; Massey 47'; Edwards 64', 67'	Stadium: Boundary Park; Attendance: 1,831; Referee: Ross Joyce

== Transfers ==
=== Transfers in ===
Date	Position	Nationality	Name	From	Fee	Ref.
1 July 2021	RB	(England)	Jordan Clarke	(England) Scunthorpe United	Free transfer	
1 July 2021	LB	(England)	Sam Hart	(England) Southend United	Free transfer	
1 July 2021	CF	(Barbados)	Hallam Hope	(England) Swindon Town	Free transfer	
1 July 2021	RB	(England)	Oliver Kilner	(England) Manchester United	Free transfer	
1 July 2021	GK	(Canada)	Jayson Leutwiler	(England) Huddersfield Town	Free transfer	
1 July 2021	CB	(England)	Harrison McGahey	(England) Scunthorpe United	Free transfer	
23 July 2021	CB	(Republic of Ireland)	Alan Sheehan	(England) Northampton Town	Free transfer	
4 August 2021	RW	(England)	Jack Stobbs	(England) Grantham Town	Free transfer	
7 August 2021	CF	(England)	Jacob Blyth	(England) Gateshead	Free transfer	
7 August 2021	DM	(Mali)	Ousseynou Cissé	(England) Leyton Orient	Free transfer	
7 August 2021	GK	(Republic of Ireland)	Danny Rogers	(Scotland) Kilmarnock	Free transfer	
13 August 2021	AM	(England)	Jamie Hopcutt	(Israel) Hapoel Kfar Saba	Free transfer	
31 January 2022	CF	(England)	Mike Fondop	(England) Hartlepool United	Free transfer	
4 February 2022	LW	(England)	Tope Obadeyi	Unattached	Free transfer	

=== Loans in ===
Date from	Position	Nationality	Name	From	Date until	Ref.
7 August 2021	DM	(Republic of Ireland)	Jamie Bowden	(England) Tottenham Hotspur	10 January 2022 (Note: On 10 January, Bowden was recalled by Tottenham.)	
17 August 2021	GK	(England)	Laurie Walker	(England) Milton Keynes Dons	24 August 2021	
20 August 2021	AM	(England)	Faysal Bettache	(England) Queens Park Rangers	10 December 2021 (Note: On 10 December, Bettache's loan was terminated and he returned to QPR.)	
17 January 2022	CM	(Republic of Ireland)	Alex Hunt	(England) Sheffield Wednesday	End of season	

=== Loans out ===
Date from	Position	Nationality	Name	To	Date until	Ref.
13 August 2021	DF	(England)	Will Sutton	(England) Witton Albion	18 December 2021 (Note: On 18 October, Sutton's loan at Witton Albion was extended by a further month, until November 2021.) (Note: On 20 November, Will's loan at Witton Albion was extended again for an extra month, until December 2021.)	
20 November 2021	CF	(England)	Vani Da Silva	(England) FC United of Manchester		
23 December 2021	CB	(England)	Will Sutton	(England) Farsley Celtic	21 January 2022	
28 December 2021	RB	(England)	Oliver Kilner	(England) Curzon Ashton	28 January 2022	

=== Transfers out ===
Date	Position	Nationality	Name	To	Fee	Ref.
30 June 2021	CF	(England)	Marcus Barnes		Released	
30 June 2021	GK	(England)	Laurence Bilboe	(England) Hemel Hempstead Town	Released	
30 June 2021	CF	(Australia)	George Blackwood	(Australia) Adelaide United	Mutual consent	
30 June 2021	LB	(England)	Cameron Borthwick-Jackson	(England) Burton Albion	Released	
30 June 2021	RB	(Portugal)	Sido Jombati	(England) Ebbsfleet United	Released	
30 June 2021	DM	(Belgium)	Brice Ntambwe		Released	
30 June 2021	GK	(England)	Gary Woods	(Scotland) Aberdeen	Released	
1 July 2021	CF	(England)	Conor McAleny	(England) Salford City	Free transfer	
9 July 2021	CM	(England)	Oliver Patrick	(England) Accrington Stanley	Free transfer	
17 August 2021	CM	(England)	Ben Hough	(England) Warrington Town	Free transfer	
27 August 2021	GK	(England)	Mackenzie Chapman	(England) Oxford United	Free transfer	
28 August 2021	CF	(England)	Jacob Blyth	(England) Chorley	Released	
31 August 2021	LB	(Italy)	Andrea Badan		Mutual consent	
27 January 2022	CF	(England)	Zak Dearnley	(England) FC Halifax Town	Mutual consent	

== Squad statistics ==
As of match played 7 May 2022

=== Appearances ===
Players with no appearances are not included on the list.

No.	Pos.	Nat.	Player	League Two			FA Cup			EFL Cup			EFL Trophy			Total		
No.	Pos.	Nat.	Player	Apps	Starts	Subs	Apps	Starts	Subs	Apps	Starts	Subs	Apps	Starts	Subs	Apps	Starts	Subs
10	MF	(England)	Davis Keillor-Dunn	46	43	3	2	2	0	3	2	1	5	3	2	56	50	6
8	MF	(England)	Callum Whelan	43	39	4	2	2	0	2	2	0	4	2	2	51	45	6
6	DF	(England)	Carl Piergianni	40	40	0	2	2	0	3	3	0	3	3	0	48	48	0
2	DF	(England)	Jordan Clarke	40	40	0	2	2	0	2	2	0	2	2	0	46	46	0
9	FW	(Barbados)	Hallam Hope	39	29	10	2	2	0	1	1	0	4	1	3	46	33	13
7	MF	(Wales)	Nicky Adams	36	31	5	2	0	2	2	0	2	4	4	0	44	35	9
24	FW	(Republic of the Congo)	Dylan Bahamboula	30	25	5	2	2	0	3	3	0	3	2	1	38	32	6
3	DF	(England)	Sam Hart	31	30	1	1	0	1	2	2	0	1	1	0	35	33	2
17	MF	(England)	Jack Stobbs	30	17	13	0	0	0	1	1	0	2	2	0	33	20	13
5	DF	(England)	Harrison McGahey	25	25	0	2	2	0	0	0	0	3	3	0	30	30	0
34	MF	(Republic of Ireland)	Harry Vaughan	23	7	16	1	0	1	3	1	2	3	3	0	30	11	19
1	GK	(Canada)	Jayson Leutwiler	22	22	0	2	2	0	1	1	0	4	4	0	29	29	0
33	DF	(Portugal)	Benny Couto	19	15	4	2	2	0	1	0	1	5	5	0	27	22	5
18	MF	(England)	Jamie Bowden	17	14	3	2	2	0	2	2	0	4	2	2	25	20	5
23	GK	(Republic of Ireland)	Danny Rogers	22	22	0	0	0	0	1	1	0	1	1	0	24	24	0
14	MF	(France)	Dylan Fage	14	10	4	2	2	0	3	3	0	4	2	2	23	17	6
28	MF	(Republic of the Congo)	Christopher Missilou	20	18	2	0	0	0	0	0	0	0	0	0	20	18	2
29	FW	(England)	Junior Luamba	15	9	6	0	0	0	2	1	1	2	1	1	19	11	8
11	FW	(England)	Zak Dearnley	12	7	5	1	0	1	2	1	1	4	3	1	19	11	8
27	MF	(England)	Jamie Hopcutt	16	6	10	1	0	1	0	0	0	2	1	1	19	7	12
22	DF	(France)	Raphaël Diarra	12	9	3	0	0	0	2	2	0	3	1	2	17	12	5
15	DF	(England)	Kyle Jameson	11	6	5	0	0	0	2	2	0	2	2	0	15	10	5
26	MF	(England)	Faysal Bettache	10	5	5	0	0	0	0	0	0	3	3	0	13	8	5
26	MF	(England)	Alex Hunt	13	7	6	0	0	0	0	0	0	0	0	0	13	7	6
4	MF	(Mali)	Ousseynou Cissé	8	8	0	0	0	0	1	1	0	2	2	0	11	11	0
32	DF	(England)	Will Sutton	9	9	0	0	0	0	0	0	0	0	0	0	9	9	0
30	FW	(England)	Tope Obadeyi	8	4	4	0	0	0	0	0	0	0	0	0	8	4	4
44	DF	(Republic of Ireland)	Alan Sheehan	6	5	1	0	0	0	0	0	0	0	0	0	6	5	1
19	FW	(England)	Vani Da Silva	3	0	3	0	0	0	1	0	1	2	1	1	6	1	5
25	FW	(England)	Jacob Blyth	3	1	2	0	0	0	1	1	0	0	0	0	4	2	2
37	GK	(England)	Laurie Walker	2	2	0	0	0	0	1	1	0	0	0	0	3	3	0
11	FW	(Cameroon)	Mike Fondop	2	1	1	0	0	0	0	0	0	0	0	0	2	1	1
39	MF	(England)	Isaac Modi	2	0	2	0	0	0	0	0	0	0	0	0	2	0	2
38	MF	(Republic of Ireland)	Trey Turner	0	0	0	0	0	0	0	0	0	1	1	0	1	1	0
Total				46			2			3			5			56		

=== Goals ===
No.	Pos.	Nat.	Player	League Two	FA Cup	EFL Cup	EFL Trophy	Total
10	MF	(England)	Davis Keillor-Dunn	15	1	0	1	17
9	FW	(Barbados)	Hallam Hope	5	0	0	0	5
24	FW	(Republic of the Congo)	Dylan Bahamboula	3	0	1	0	4
6	DF	(England)	Carl Piergianni	3	0	0	1	4
11	FW	(England)	Zak Dearnley	0	0	0	3	3
11	FW	(Cameroon)	Mike Fondop	2	0	0	0	2
29	FW	(England)	Junior Luamba	2	0	0	0	2
28	MF	(Republic of the Congo)	Christopher Missilou	2	0	0	0	2
17	MF	(England)	Jack Stobbs	2	0	0	0	2
32	DF	(England)	Will Sutton	2	0	0	0	2
34	MF	(Republic of Ireland)	Harry Vaughan	1	0	0	1	2
18	MF	(England)	Jamie Bowden	1	0	0	0	1
2	DF	(England)	Jordan Clarke	1	0	0	0	1
33	DF	(Portugal)	Benny Couto	1	0	0	0	1
3	DF	(England)	Sam Hart	1	0	0	0	1
27	MF	(England)	Jamie Hopcutt	1	0	0	0	1
5	DF	(England)	Harrison McGahey	0	1	0	0	1
8	MF	(England)	Callum Whelan	1	0	0	0	1
Total				43	2	1	6	52

=== Disciplinary record ===
No.	Pos.	Nat.	Player	League Two			FA Cup			EFL Cup			EFL Trophy			Total		
No.	Pos.	Nat.	Player	Yellow card	Second yellow card	Red card	Yellow card	Second yellow card	Red card	Yellow card	Second yellow card	Red card	Yellow card	Second yellow card	Red card	Yellow card	Second yellow card	Red card
6	DF	(England)	Carl Piergianni	10	0	1	0	0	0	0	0	0	0	0	0	10	0	1
2	DF	(England)	Jordan Clarke	6	1	0	1	0	0	1	0	0	1	0	0	9	1	0
24	FW	(Republic of the Congo)	Dylan Bahamboula	2	0	1	1	0	0	0	0	0	0	0	0	3	0	1
3	DF	(England)	Sam Hart	10	0	0	0	0	0	0	0	0	0	0	0	10	0	0
8	MF	(England)	Callum Whelan	7	0	0	0	0	0	0	0	0	0	0	0	7	0	0
18	MF	(England)	Jamie Bowden	6	0	0	0	0	0	0	0	0	0	0	0	6	0	0
17	MF	(England)	Jack Stobbs	6	0	0	0	0	0	0	0	0	0	0	0	6	0	0
22	DF	(France)	Raphaël Diarra	4	0	0	0	0	0	0	0	0	1	0	0	5	0	0
9	FW	(Barbados)	Hallam Hope	5	0	0	0	0	0	0	0	0	0	0	0	5	0	0
5	DF	(England)	Harrison McGahey	4	0	0	1	0	0	0	0	0	0	0	0	5	0	0
7	MF	(Wales)	Nicky Adams	4	0	0	0	0	0	0	0	0	0	0	0	4	0	0
15	DF	(England)	Kyle Jameson	3	0	0	0	0	0	0	0	0	0	0	0	3	0	0
4	MF	(Mali)	Ousseynou Cissé	1	0	0	0	0	0	0	0	0	1	0	0	2	0	0
10	MF	(England)	Davis Keillor-Dunn	0	0	0	1	0	0	1	0	0	0	0	0	2	0	0
29	FW	(England)	Junior Luamba	2	0	0	0	0	0	0	0	0	0	0	0	2	0	0
28	MF	(Republic of the Congo)	Christopher Missilou	2	0	0	0	0	0	0	0	0	0	0	0	2	0	0
32	DF	(England)	Will Sutton	2	0	0	0	0	0	0	0	0	0	0	0	2	0	0
25	FW	(England)	Jacob Blyth	1	0	0	0	0	0	0	0	0	0	0	0	1	0	0
33	DF	(Portugal)	Benny Couto	1	0	0	0	0	0	0	0	0	0	0	0	1	0	0
14	MF	(France)	Dylan Fage	1	0	0	0	0	0	0	0	0	0	0	0	1	0	0
27	MF	(England)	Jamie Hopcutt	1	0	0	0	0	0	0	0	0	0	0	0	1	0	0
26	MF	(England)	Alex Hunt	1	0	0	0	0	0	0	0	0	0	0	0	1	0	0
1	GK	(Canada)	Jayson Leutwiler	1	0	0	0	0	0	0	0	0	0	0	0	1	0	0
23	GK	(England)	Danny Rogers	1	0	0	0	0	0	0	0	0	0	0	0	1	0	0
44	DF	(Republic of Ireland)	Alan Sheehan	1	0	0	0	0	0	0	0	0	0	0	0	1	0	0
Total				82	1	2	4	0	0	2	0	0	3	0	0	91	1	2
