= 2024 FA Trophy final =

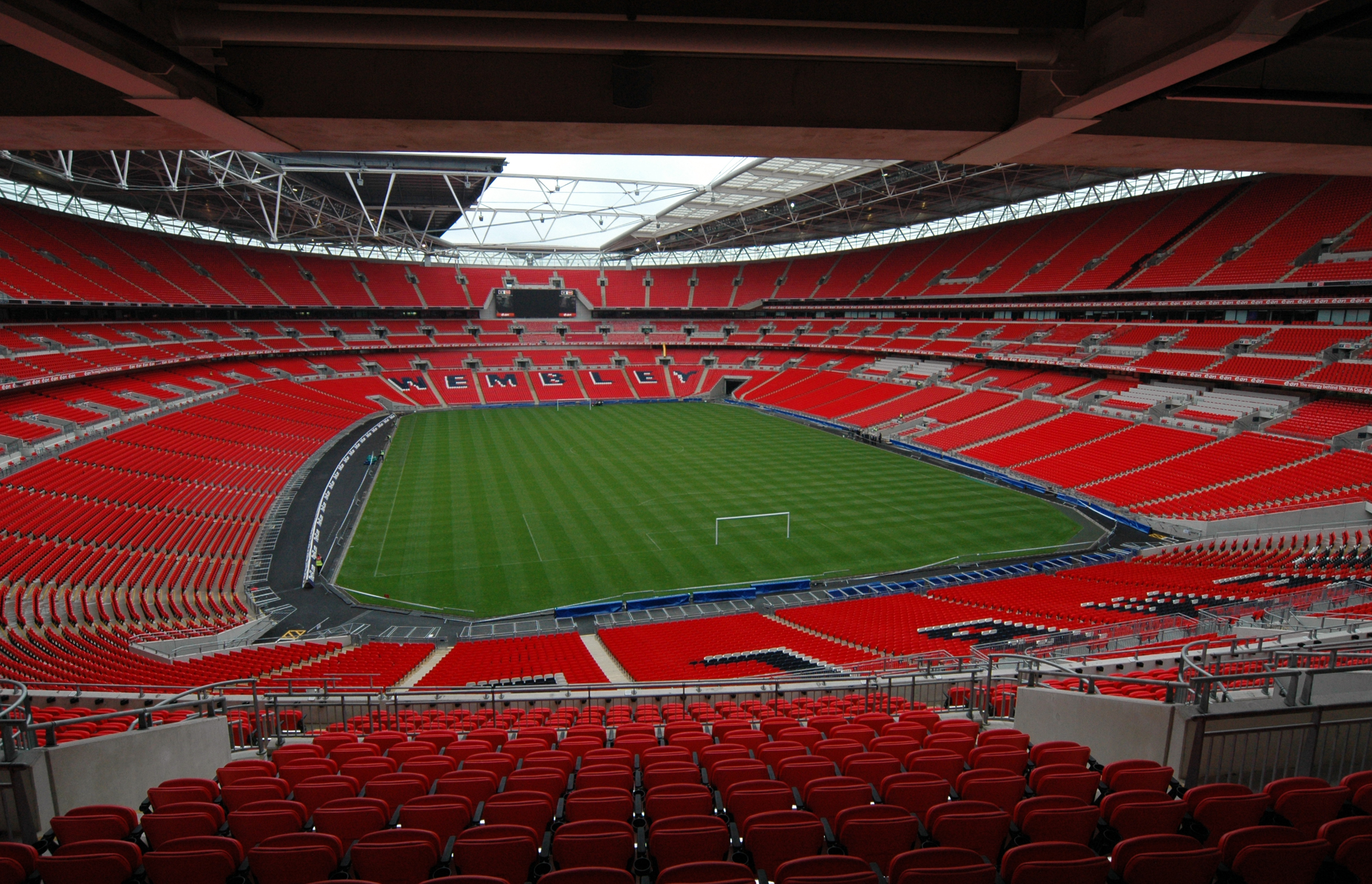
- Wembley Stadium hosted the final
- Event: 2023–24 FA Trophy
Gateshead	Solihull Moors
2	2
- After extra time Gateshead won 5–4 on penalties
- Date: 11 May 2024
- Venue: Wembley Stadium, London
- Referee: Sam Allison
- Attendance: 19,964

The 2024 FA Trophy final was an association football match played at Wembley Stadium, London, on 11 May 2024. It was the 55th FA Trophy final and was contested between Gateshead and Solihull Moors. It was Gateshead's second consecutive final following their defeat the previous year, and Solihull Moors' first final. Due to sponsorship by Isuzu, the final was officially named the Isuzu FA Trophy Final.

As part of Non-League Finals Day, the FA Vase final was played earlier in the day at the same venue. Each club from both matches had its supporters allocated to one of four dedicated sections of Wembley Stadium. Gateshead fans were housed on the east side of the stadium while followers of Solihull were on the west side. There was also a neutral section for other spectators. The match was televised live on TNT Sports 1, while BBC Radio Newcastle and BBC Radio WM provided radio commentary.

As participants in the 2023–24 National League, the clubs met twice during the league season. Gateshead won 2–1 in the first meeting, followed by a 3–2 Solihull win in the reverse fixture. After finishing 5th and 6th respectively, the teams were also scheduled to meet in the play-offs, however Gateshead were removed from the play-offs due to not meeting the EFL's ground ownership criteria.

== Route to the final ==
=== Gateshead ===
12 December 2023 3R	Rochdale	1–5	Gateshead	Rochdale
19:45 GMT	Sinclair 73' (pen.)	Report	McBride 45+3'; Chadwick 51'; Whelan 54'; Dinanga 90+2', 90+5'	Stadium: Spotland Stadium; Attendance: 1,107

13 January 2024 4R	Gateshead	2–2 (4–3 p)	Weston-super-Mare	Gateshead
15:00 GMT	Storey 45+1'; Dinanga 46'	Report	Grubb 2'; Humphries 90+1'	Stadium: Gateshead International Stadium; Attendance: 566
	Penalties
	Booty (penalty scored); Hannant (penalty scored); Richardson (penalty scored); Dinanga (penalty missed); Storey (penalty scored)		Grubb (penalty missed); Humphries (penalty scored); Reid (penalty scored); Fletcher (penalty missed); Mannings (penalty scored)

10 February 2024 5R	Hereford	0–1	Gateshead	Hereford
15:00 GMT		Report	Dinanga 77'	Stadium: Edgar Street; Attendance: 2,263

9 March 2024 QF	Gateshead	3–2	Peterborough Sports	Gateshead
15:00 GMT	Brown 7', 19', 22'	Report	McCammon 54'; Gash 55'	Stadium: Gateshead International Stadium; Attendance: 1,207

6 April 2024 SF	Gateshead	2–1	Macclesfield	Gateshead
15:00 BST	Worman 5'; Whelan 25'	Report	Drummond 47'	Stadium: Gateshead International Stadium; Attendance: 3,031

=== Solihull Moors ===
8 December 2023 3R	Scunthorpe United	0–2	Solihull Moors	Scunthorpe
19:45 GMT		Report	Stevens 20'; Kelly 45+1'	Stadium: Glanford Park; Attendance: 1,899

13 January 2024 4R	Solihull Moors	5–1	Nantwich Town	Solihull
15:00 GMT	Stevens 27'; Ryley 56'; Owen 67'; Bruck 82'; Howell 90+1'	Report	Kay 84'	Stadium: Damson Park; Attendance: 808

10 February 2024 5R	Chorley	1–3	Solihull Moors	Chorley
15:00 GMT	Ellis 90+4'	Report	Stevens 2', 44'; Sbarra 27'	Stadium: Victory Park; Attendance: 2,087

9 March 2024 QF	Wealdstone	1–1 (3–4 p)	Solihull Moors	Ruislip
15:00 GMT	Kretzschmar 15'	Report	Maycock 25'	Stadium: Grosvenor Vale; Attendance: 1,018
	Penalties
	Kretzschmar (penalty missed); Bowen (penalty scored); Henry (penalty scored); Adarkwa (penalty scored); Duku (penalty missed)		Warburton (penalty scored); Shade (penalty scored); Sbarra (penalty scored); Beck (penalty scored); Clarke (penalty missed)

6 April 2024 SF	Bromley	1–2	Solihull Moors	Bromley
15:00 BST	Krauhaus 60'	Report	Whitmore 36' (74)	Stadium: Hayes Lane; Attendance: 4,038

== Match ==
=== Details ===
11 May 2024
16:15

Gateshead(5)	2–2 (a.e.t.)	Solihull Moors(5)
Booty 45+3'; Brown 110'	Report	Beck 69', 101' (pen.)
Penalties
Booty (penalty missed); Dinanga (penalty scored); Francis (penalty missed); Olley (penalty scored); Storey (penalty scored); Evans (penalty scored); Allan (penalty missed); Brown (penalty scored)	5–4	(penalty scored) Warburton; (penalty missed) Shade; (penalty missed) Clarke; (penalty scored) Beck; (penalty scored) Newton; (penalty scored) Mafuta; (penalty missed) Labadie; (penalty missed) Whitmore

Wembley Stadium
Attendance: 19,964
Referee: Sam Allison
