= Jamie Bowden (footballer) =

Irish footballer (born 2001)

Personal information
- Full name: Jamie Patrick Bowden
- Date of birth: 9 July 2001 (age 25)
- Place of birth: Edmonton, England
- Height: 1.83 m (6 ft 0 in)
- Position: Midfielder

Youth career
- 2007–2021: Tottenham Hotspur

Senior career*
Years	Team	Apps	(Gls)
2021–2023	Tottenham Hotspur	0	(0)
2021–2022	→ Oldham Athletic (loan)	17	(1)

International career
2020	Republic of Ireland U19	1	(2)
- * Club domestic league appearances and goals

Jamie Patrick Bowden (born 9 July 2001) is a former professional footballer who played as a midfielder. Born in England, he has represented the Republic of Ireland at youth level.

== Career ==
Bowden joined the Tottenham academy at the age of six. In August 2021, Bowden was loaned out to Oldham Athletic. He was put straight into the squad in Oldham's first League Two game making his debut against Newport County. Bowden returned to Tottenham in January 2022. He retired in January 2025 following recurring issues related to an ankle injury sustained in August 2022.

== Personal life ==
Bowden was born at North Middlesex Hospital in Edmonton, London and brought up in Tottenham. He attended the Holy Family Catholic School in Walthamstow. He has a brother, Jake Bowden and Sister Leah Bowden.

After his retirement, he has taken the coaching route. He has obtained the UEFA C license.

== Career statistics ==
As of match played 4 January 2022

Appearances and goals by club, season and competition
Club	Season	League			FA Cup		EFL Cup		Other		Total	
Club	Season	Division	Apps	Goals	Apps	Goals	Apps	Goals	Apps	Goals	Apps	Goals
Tottenham Hotspur U21	2018–19	—			—		—		4 (Note: Appearance(s) in the EFL Trophy)	0	4	0
Tottenham Hotspur U21	2019–20	—			—		—		1	0	1	0
Tottenham Hotspur U21	Total		0	0	0	0	0	0	5	0	5	0
Oldham Athletic (loan)	2021–22	EFL League Two	17	1	2	0	2	0	4	0	25	1
Career total			17	1	2	0	2	0	9	0	30	1
