= Nicky Adams =

English footballer (born 1986)

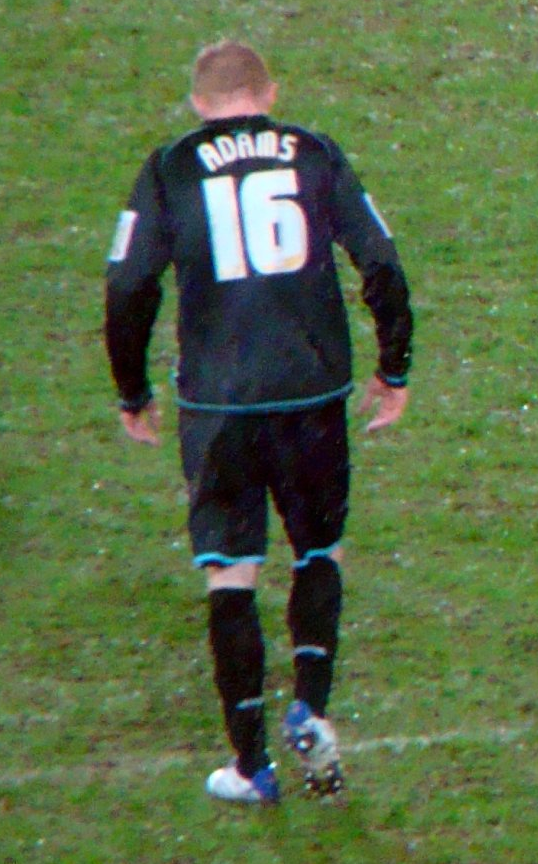
- Adams playing for Leicester City in 2010

Personal information
- Full name: Nicholas William Adams
- Date of birth: 16 October 1986 (age 40)
- Place of birth: Bolton, England
- Height: 5 ft 10 in (1.78 m)
- Position: Midfielder

Team information
- Current team: Oldham Athletic (Academy coach)

Youth career
- –2005: Bury

Senior career*
Years	Team	Apps	(Gls)
2005–2008	Bury	77	(14)
2008–2010	Leicester City	30	(0)
2009	→ Rochdale (loan)	14	(1)
2010	→ Leyton Orient (loan)	6	(0)
2010–2011	Brentford	7	(0)
2010	→ Rochdale (loan)	11	(0)
2011–2012	Rochdale	60	(4)
2012–2014	Crawley Town	70	(9)
2014	Rotherham United	15	(1)
2014–2015	Bury	38	(1)
2015–2016	Northampton Town	39	(3)
2016–2018	Carlisle United	59	(3)
2018–2019	Bury	46	(2)
2019–2021	Northampton Town	51	(1)
2021–2022	Oldham Athletic	59	(0)
2022–2024	Radcliffe	88	(2)
2024–2025	Bury	18	(0)
Total		688	(41)

International career
2007–2008	Wales U21	5	(0)
- * Club domestic league appearances and goals as of 18:31, 8 May 2025 (UTC)

Nicholas William Adams (born 16 October 1986) is an English retired professional footballer who played as a winger and wing back. Although he was born in England, he has represented Wales under-21 at international level.

He is currently an Academy coach at EFL League Two side Oldham Athletic.

Adams began his professional career at Bury in 2005 and had four spells there. He has also played for Bury, Leicester City, Brentford, Rochdale, Crawley Town, Rotherham United, Carlisle United, Northampton Town and Oldham Athletic.

== Playing career ==
=== Bury ===
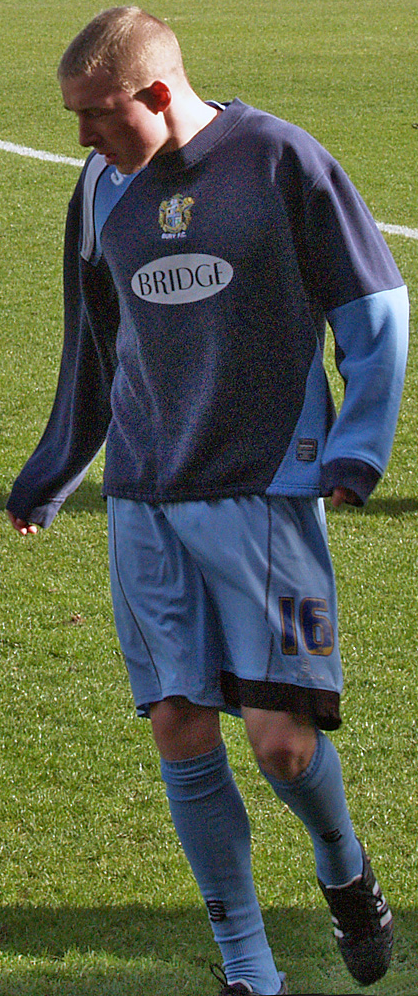
Adams playing for Bury in 2007

Adams was born in Bolton, Greater Manchester. Adams progressed through the Youth and Centre of Excellence system at Bury and shot to fame with a debut goal against Darlington as he made his first-team debut in a 1–0 home win in October 2005. After the match, Adams debut performance was praised by Chris Casper saying "I'm made up for young Nicky Adams, as he has really worked hard on his game, he's run himself into the ground for the team, and he took the goal well." Adams earned more playing time in the first team at Bury. The next season, Adams scored his second goal with an unstoppable shot from 35 yards in a 3–0 win over Grimsby Town on 26 August 2006. After the match, Adams spoke out about the goal, saying "It wasn't bad for a tap in". At the end of the season, Adams signed a new contract. The next season, Adams was soon on a goalscoring form, unlike his two season at Bury, and scored twelve goals this season, including his first brace in a 3–0 win over Barnet on 3 November 2007. After the match, Adams was named man of the match and was praised by Casper. At the end of the season, Adams won the Young player of the year, having received the most votes. Having won the Young player of the year, Adams was offered a new deal to stay at Bury but in June, Adams turned down a deal.

=== Leicester City ===
Adams joined Leicester City for an initial £100,000 which could rise to £225,000, a deal which was completed on 1 July 2008, with the player signing a three-year contract. Three months after joining Leicester City, the club was ordered to pay £100,000 for Adams, after both parties failed to agree a fee He became Nigel Pearson's third signing of that day after Michael Morrison and Lloyd Dyer. Adams made his debut in a League Cup match against Stockport on 12 August 2008, in which Leicester won 1–0. His league debut came in a 3–1 win over Tranmere Rovers on 23 August. On 2 September 2008, Adams scored his first goal in a Football League Trophy, as Leicester City beat Hartlepool United. Soon after, his playing time at Leicester City is soon reduced and need to join a club on loan to get regular first-team football. The next season, Adams forms at Leicester City didn't produced well, like he did at Bury, as he used more often on the bench. But in the second round of a League Cup, Adams scored his first goal of the season in a 2–1 loss against Preston North End.

==== Loans ====
On 19 January 2009, Adams joined Rochdale on loan for a month, scoring on his debut in a 3–2 away defeat to Dagenham & Redbridge on 24 January. On 19 February, Adams extended his loan at Rochdale by a further month. On 23 March 2009, Adams made a return to Leicester after the club wants him back despite desire to stay.

On 15 January 2010, he was loaned to Leyton Orient for one month. Having impressed at Leyton Orient with six appearances, Adams was recalled by Leicester City. Manager Geraint Williams was disappointed to see Adams being recalled. Shortly returning, Adams would be used often, when coming on as a substitute for the last five games towards the end of the season.

=== Brentford ===
Though, Adams wanted to stay at Leicester City to fight for his place in the first team. However, on 19 August 2010, Adams signed for Brentford. He made his debut coming off the bench in the 1–1 draw at Swindon on 21 August 2010.

=== Rochdale ===
On 14 October 2010, Adams joined Rochdale on loan, having failed to settle in London with Brentford. In January, Adams moved to Rochdale on loan. After the move, Adams said joining Rochdale could breathe new life into his football career. Two days later, Adams made his debut, providing the assist which led to an own-goal for Byron Anthony, in a 2–1 loss against Bristol Rovers. Adams went on to provide a further 14 assists. When the transfer window opened, Adams signed on a permanent basis with Rochdale, having penned a two-and-a-half-year contract on 1 January 2011.

The following season, Adams continued to be in the first team. On 10 September 2011, Adams scored his first goal but was soon sent-off after a second bookable offence, in a 4–2 win against his former club Bury, followed his second on 19 November 2011, in a 1–0 win over Preston. He since scored against Charlton and Exeter City. However, Rochdale ware relegated to League Two after two seasons in League One. Just before the season ended, Adams was placed on a transfer list.

=== Crawley Town ===
On 8 June 2012, Adams joined newly promoted League One side Crawley Town on a free transfer. After joining, Adams expressed his delight of moving down to the South, despite having previously failed to settle whilst at Brentford. In the first round of the Football League Cup, Adams scored on his debut and set up a goal for John Akinde in a 2–2 draw against Millwall, which they won on penalties. On the opening game of the season, Adams made his debut in a 3–0 win over Scunthorpe United; on 29 September 2012, Adams scored his first goal in a 2–0 win over Carlisle United. In the following three games, Adams scored four goals, including a brace and assist for Hope Akpan in a 3–2 win over Bury on 13 October 2012. In the second round of the FA Cup, Adams scored Crawley's first goal in a 3–0 win over Chelmsford City and in the third round against Reading, Adams gave Crawley Town an early lead with a stunning strike from outside the area after just 14 seconds, though Crawley lost 3–1. After the match, Adams says his first minute screamer was 'the best goal of his career'. Adams started all of Crawley's league games during the 2012–13 season, scoring 8 goals. He made 24 league appearances for Crawley in the 2013–14 season, scoring once.

=== Rotherham United ===
On 31 January 2014, Adams joined Rotherham United on a two-and-a-half-year contract. His first appearance for Rotherham came on 15 February 2014 in a 2–1 victory over Stevenage; he came on as a 79th-minute substitute. He made 15 appearances for Rotherham, scoring once.

=== Return to Bury ===
On 16 May 2014, Adams returned to Bury on a three-year contract for an undisclosed fee. Despite making 38 league appearances during the 2014–15 season, Adams was transfer listed at the end of the season.

=== Northampton Town ===
On 22 May 2015, Adams joined Northampton Town on a three-year contract.

=== Carlisle United ===
On 24 May 2016, Adams joined Carlisle United on a two-year contract.

=== Third contract at Bury ===
On 15 May 2018, Adams re-signed for Bury, who were newly relegated to League Two, on a one-year contract. This contract was extended in March 2019, but he left the club in June 2019 following a dispute.

=== Return to Northampton Town ===
On 5 June 2019, it was announced that Adams had rejoined Northampton Town on a free transfer, signing a two-year deal.

=== Oldham Athletic ===
On 22 January 2021, Adams joined League Two side Oldham Athletic on a contract until June 2022. Following relegation, Adams was offered a new contract but the two parties could not agree terms and Adams left the club.

=== Radcliffe ===
In June 2022, Adams joined Radcliffe.

During his time with the club, he captained the side to both the Manchester Senior Cup and the Northern Premier League Premier Division title.

=== Fourth spell with Bury ===
On 2 December 2024, Adams returned to North West Counties Football League Premier Division club Bury for a fourth spell.

== Coaching career ==
On 7 June 2025, it was confirmed that Adams had been appointed as the new first-team coach at Wigan Athletic following a coaching restructure by manager Ryan Lowe. He departed the club following the appointment of Gary Caldwell as head coach in February 2026.

On 19 February 2026, he returned to Radcliffe as part of Bernard Morley's coaching staff and took over as caretaker manager in August 2026 when Morley left the club.

On 3 October 2026, it was confirmed that Adams had left Radcliffe following the appointment of Grant Shenton as manager.

Within three days of his departure from Radcliffe, he returned to Oldham Athletic as an academy coach with specific responsibilities for the under 16 team.

== International career ==
Despite being born in England, Adams chose to play for the Wales U-21, making his debut on 20 November 2007 against France.

== Career statistics ==
As of 2 December 2024

Appearances and goals by club, season and competition
Club	Season	League			FA Cup		League Cup		Other		Total	
Club	Season	Division	Apps	Goals	Apps	Goals	Apps	Goals	Apps	Goals	Apps	Goals
Bury	2005–06	League Two	15	1	2	0	0	0	1 (Note: Appearance(s) in Football League Trophy.)	0	18	1
Bury	2006–07	League Two	19	1	2	0	2	0	1	0	24	1
Bury	2007–08	League Two	43	12	5	1	1	0	3	0	52	13
Leicester City	2008–09	League One	12	0	2	0	1	0	3	1	18	1
Leicester City	2009–10	Championship	18	0	0	0	2	1	0	0	20	1
Leicester City	Total		30	0	2	0	3	1	3	1	38	2
Rochdale (loan)	2008–09	League Two	14	1	—		—		—		14	1
Leyton Orient (loan)	2009–10	League One	6	0	—		—		—		6	0
Brentford	2010–11	League One	7	0	—		1	0	2	0	10	0
Rochdale	2010–11	League One	30	0	1	0	—		—		31	0
Rochdale	2011–12	League One	41	4	1	0	3	0	2	0	47	4
Rochdale	Total		71	4	2	0	3	0	2	0	78	4
Crawley Town	2012–13	League One	46	8	3	2	3	1	1	0	53	11
Crawley Town	2013–14	League One	24	1	3	0	1	2	1	0	29	3
Crawley Town	Total		70	9	6	2	4	3	2	0	82	14
Rotherham United	2013–14	League One	15	1	—		—		—		15	1
Bury	2014–15	League Two	38	1	3	0	1	0	2	0	44	1
Northampton Town	2015–16	League Two	39	3	4	0	1	0	1	0	45	3
Carlisle United	2016–17	League Two	42	3	2	0	2	0	2 (Note: Appearances in League Two play-offs.)	0	48	3
Carlisle United	2017–18	League Two	17	0	0	0	2	0	2 (Note: Appearances in EFL Trophy.)	0	21	0
Carlisle United	Total		59	3	2	0	4	0	4	0	69	3
Bury	2018–19	League Two	46	2	1	0	0	0	6	1	53	3
Bury	Total		161	17	13	1	4	0	13	1	191	19
Northampton Town	2019–20	League Two	37	1	5	2	0	0	4 (Note: Appearances in League Two play-offs)	0	46	3
Northampton Town	2020–21	League One	14	0	0	0	0	0	2	0	16	0
Northampton Town	Total		90	4	9	2	1	0	7	0	107	6
Oldham Athletic	2020–21	League Two	23	0	0	0	0	0	0	0	23	0
Oldham Athletic	2021–22	League Two	36	0	2	0	2	0	4	0	44	0
Oldham Athletic	Total		59	0	2	0	2	0	4	0	67	0
Radcliffe	2022–23	Northern Premier League Premier Division	42	0	1	0	—		5 (Note: One appearance in FA Trophy, three appearances in Manchester Senior Cup, one appearance in Lancashire Senior Cup)	0	48	0
Radcliffe	2023–24	Northern Premier League Premier Division	36	2	1	0	—		4 (Note: Appearance(s) in FA Trophy)	0	41	2
Radcliffe	2024–25	National League North	10	0	2	0	—		0	0	12	0
Radcliffe	Total		88	2	4	0	0	0	9	0	101	2
Career total			670	41	40	5	22	4	46	2	778	52

== Honours ==
Leicester City

- Football League One: 2008–09

Northampton Town

- Football League Two: 2015–16
- EFL League Two play-offs: 2020

Bury

- EFL League Two runner-up: 2018–19

Radcliffe

- Northern Premier League Premier Division: 2023–24
- Manchester Senior Cup: 2022–23

Individual

- PFA Team of the Year: 2016–17 League Two, 2019–20 League Two
