= Raphaël Diarra =

French footballer (born 1995)

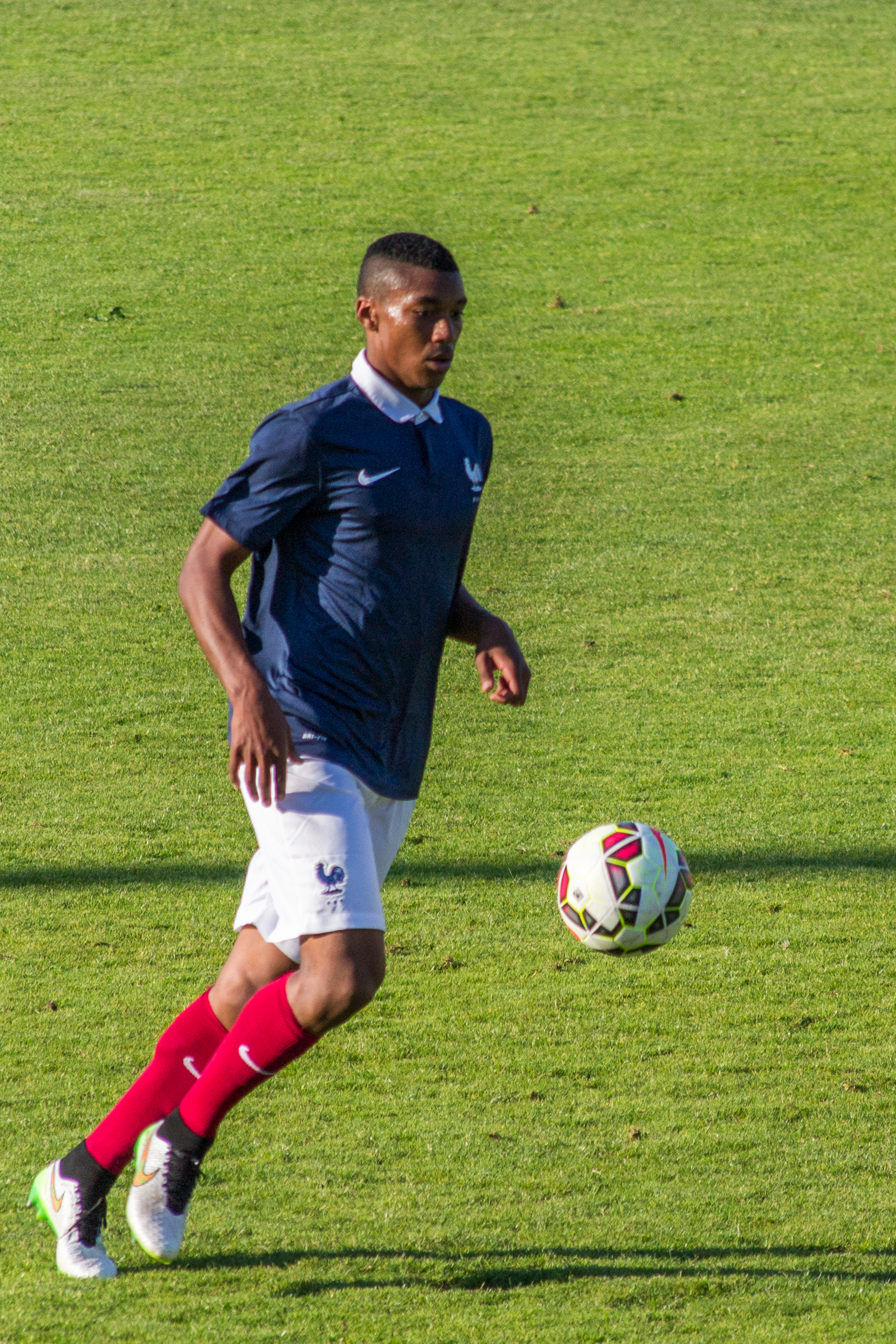
- Diarra playing for France U20s

Personal information
- Date of birth: 27 May 1995 (age 31)
- Place of birth: Paris, France
- Height: 1.85 m (6 ft 1 in)
- Position: Centre-back

Team information
- Current team: Atert Bissen
- Number: 2

Youth career
- 2004–2010: Paris FC
- 2010–2013: Monaco

Senior career*
Years	Team	Apps	(Gls)
2013–2018	Monaco B	46	(1)
2015–2018	Monaco	0	(0)
2016–2017	→ Cercle Brugge (loan)	15	(1)
2018	Ashdod	0	(0)
2018	Quevilly Rouen B	1	(0)
2018–2020	Quevilly-Rouen	31	(0)
2020–2022	Oldham Athletic	28	(0)
2022–2023	Borgo	27	(1)
2023–2024	Arta/Solar7		
2024–2025	SC Gagnoa		
2026	Virton	8	(0)
2026–	Atert Bissen		

International career
2013	France U19	2	(0)
2014–2015	France U20	6	(0)
- * Club domestic league appearances and goals as of 28 June 2026

Raphaël Diarra (born 27 May 1995) is a French professional footballer who plays as a defender for Luxembourg National Division side Atert Bissen.

Diarra is a youth exponent from AS Monaco and has played for Cercle Brugge, US Quevilly-Rouen and Ashdod before signing for Oldham. He has played in the Europa League and been capped at a youth level for France.

== Personal life ==
Diarra was born in Paris and has French nationality. He is of Malian descent. He is a devout muslim.

== Club career ==
=== Monaco ===
Diarra came through the youth ranks of AS Monaco and was placed into the B team. He played his first game for the B team in October 2013, in a 2–0 win against Martigues. He established himself as a regular starter for Monaco B and eventually he scored his first goal in November 2014, against Rodez. Diarra made his debut for Monaco on 10 December 2015, in a UEFA Europa League game. He replaced Bernardo Silva after 65 minutes in a 4–1 away defeat against Tottenham Hotspur. After his loan spell with Cercle Brugge, he continued playing for Monaco B.

==== Cercle Brugge (loan) ====
On 31 August 2016, Diarra joined Belgian side, Cercle Brugge, on loan, until the end of the 2016–17 season. He played in 15 games, including a 3–1 win against Tubize, in which Diarra scored his second ever professional goal. In his last game for Cercle Brugge, Diarra was given two yellow cards and subsequently sent off as a result.

=== Ashdod ===
After spending another season with Monaco B, Diarra was sold to Israeli side, Ashdod. Diarra made no league appearance during his tenure but he was subbed on with 9 minutes remaining in a Toto Cup Ligat Al game against Hapoel Hadera. He made no other appearances for Ashdod.

=== US Quevilly-Rouen ===
After a disappointing season with Ashdod, Diarra returned to France, where he joined US Quevilly-Rouen. He played one game for Quevilly B, which was a 1–1 draw against Pacy Ménilles. He made his debut for the first team a week later, in a 1–0 loss against Chambly Oise. Through his two years with the National 1 outfit, Diarra made 31 league appearances, as well as three cup appearances.

=== Oldham ===
On November 10, 2020, he signed for Oldham Athletic until June 2021. He made his debut on the same day, in a 3–1 win to Bradford City. In his first season, Diarra started in 16 league games and solidified his position in the team. He also partook in three cup games. Manager Harry Kewell utilised Diarra as both a midfielder and a defender throughout the season. On 12 March 2021, Oldham exercised an extension on Diarra's contract to keep him on for another season. Following the club's relegation to the National League, Diarra was released at the end of the 2021–22 season.

=== Other clubs ===
In August 2026, Diarra moved to Luxembourg side Atert Bissen.

== International career ==
Diarra could play for the Mali National Team or the France national U-21 team. Between 2013 and 2015, Diarra has been capped, at a youth level, a total of 8 times for France. At the time, Diarra was involved in the winner squad of the World Youth Festival Toulon.

== Career statistics ==
As of match played 1 March 2022

Appearances and goals by club, season and competition
Club	Season	League			National Cup (Note: These competitions include: the Belgian Cup, the Toto Cup, the Coupe de France and the FA Cup)		League Cup (Note: These competitions include: the Coupe de la Ligue and the EFL Cup)		Other		Total	
Club	Season	Division	Apps	Goals	Apps	Goals	Apps	Goals	Apps	Goals	Apps	Goals
Monaco B	2013–14	National 2	14	0	0	0	0	0	0	0	14	0
Monaco B	2014–15	National 2	23	1	0	0	0	0	0	0	23	1
Monaco B	2015–16	National 2	14	2	0	0	0	0	0	0	14	2
Monaco	2015–16	Ligue 1	0	0	0	0	0	0	1 (Note: Appearance in UEFA Europa League)	0	1	0
Monaco B	2016–17	National 2	1	0	0	0	0	0	0	0	1	0
Monaco	2016–17	Ligue 1	0	0	0	0	0	0	0	0	0	0
Monaco B	2017–18	National 2	9	1	0	0	0	0	0	0	9	1
Monaco Total			61	4	0	0	0	0	1	0	62	4
Cercle Brugge (loan)	2016–17	First Division B	15	1	1	0	0	0	0	0	16	1
Ashdod	2018–19	Ligat Ha'Al	0	0	1	0	0	0	0	0	1	0
Quevilly-Rouen B	2018–19	National 3	1	0	0	0	0	0	0	0	1	0
Quevilly-Rouen	2018–19	National 1	14	0	0	0	0	0	0	0	14	0
Quevilly-Rouen	2018–19	National 1	17	0	2	0	1	0	0	0	20	0
Total			32	0	2	0	1	0	0	0	35	1
Oldham Athletic	2020–21	League Two	16	0	1	0	0	0	2 (Note: Appearance(s) in the EFL Trophy)	0	19	0
Oldham Athletic	2021–22	League Two	12	0	0	0	2	0	3	0	17	0
Oldham Athletic	Total		28	0	1	0	2	0	5	0	36	0
Career total			136	5	5	0	3	0	6	0	150	5
