= Callum Whelan =

English footballer (born 1998)

Personal information
- Full name: Callum Tyler Whelan
- Date of birth: 24 September 1998 (age 28)
- Place of birth: Barnsley, England
- Height: 5 ft 9 in (1.76 m)
- Position: Midfielder

Team information
- Current team: Carlisle United
- Number: 8

Youth career
- Barnsley
- 2007–2018: Manchester United

Senior career*
Years	Team	Apps	(Gls)
2018–2019	Manchester United	0	(0)
2019	→ Port Vale (loan)	0	(0)
2019–2020	Watford	0	(0)
2020–2022	Oldham Athletic	74	(1)
2022–2023	Solihull Moors	21	(0)
2023	→ Gateshead (loan)	13	(0)
2023–2025	Gateshead	52	(11)
2025–	Carlisle United	44	(2)
- * Club domestic league appearances and goals as of 19:26, 1 May 2026 (UTC)

Callum Tyler Whelan (born 24 September 1998) is an English professional footballer who plays as a midfielder for National League club Carlisle United.

A graduate of the academy at Manchester United, he had a loan spell at Port Vale in the 2018–19 season, but did not feature in a matchday squad. He signed with Watford in August 2019 and featured in two FA Cup games during the 2019–20 season. He signed with Oldham Athletic in August 2020. After his release by Oldham, he signed for National League side Solihull Moors in July 2022, from where he joined Gateshead on loan in February 2023. The move to Gateshead was made permanent in July 2023. He won the FA Trophy with the club in 2024. He returned to the English Football League (EFL) with Carlisle United in January 2025, though Carlisle lost their EFL status at the end of the 2024–25 season.

== Career ==
=== Manchester United ===
Whelan grew up in the Barnsley village of Hemingfield and spent the early part of his childhood at the Barnsley Academy. He joined Manchester United at the age of eight, and went on to become one of three players shortlisted for the Jimmy Murphy Young Player of the Year award in 2017. He signed a new contract with the club in July 2018. On 31 January 2019, he joined League Two side Port Vale on loan until the end of the 2018–19 season. He failed to make it into a match-day squad under new manager John Askey, who felt he was not yet ready for senior football, and the loan was ended early on 2 April.

=== Watford ===
In August 2019, Whelan signed a one-year contract at Watford, with the option of a further year. He made his first-team debut for Watford in the fourth round of the FA Cup on 4 January 2020, coming on as a 61st-minute substitute for Domingos Quina in a 3–3 draw with Tranmere Rovers at Vicarage Road. He started in the replay 19 days later, which ended in a 2–1 defeat. However, the club confirmed he would not be offered a new contract on 6 August 2020.

=== Oldham Athletic ===
On 28 August 2020, Whelan signed a two-year contract at Oldham Athletic after impressing head coach Harry Kewell during a three-week trial period. His game time and form improved after Keith Curle replaced Kewell in March. He started 23 league games in the 2020–21 campaign, making a total of 38 competitive appearances. He scored his first career goal on 29 March 2022, in a 2–0 win over Leyton Orient at Boundary Park. Whelan was released by manager John Sheridan following relegation at the end of the 2021–22 season.

=== Solihull Moors ===
On 26 July 2022, Whelan signed a one-year contract with National League club Solihull Moors after a trial period, during which he scored a goal in a friendly against Brackley Town. He played 20 matches for the club, but lost his first-team place due to injury and increased competition in the midfield, so in February 2023 he moved on loan to league rivals Gateshead until the end of the 2022–23 season. He was recalled from his loan on 25 April as manager Neal Ardley wanted to use him for Solihull's final two games of the campaign; during his time at the Gateshead International Stadium he missed just one of 14 possible games to attend the birth of his daughter. He was released by Solihull at the end of the season.

=== Gateshead ===
Having impressed during his loan spell in the second half of the previous season, Whelan permanently returned to Gateshead on a two-year contract. He was awarded the National League Player of the Month award for February 2024, having registered two goals and two assists in four matches. Interim manager Rob Elliot said that he was impressed with Whelan both on and off the ball, adding that "he is our leader, he sets traps and both him and Luke Hannant are the ones we trust the most to set our structure so well". He scored five goals in 28 league games during the 2023–24 season, however, Gateshead were denied a place in the play-offs due to stadium regulation issues. Whelan and Gateshead instead made it to Wembley Stadium in the FA Trophy and defeated Solihull Moors on penalties in the final.

=== Carlisle United ===
On 3 January 2025, Whelan signed for League Two side Carlisle United on a two-and-a-half year deal for an undisclosed fee, reuniting with head coach Mike Williamson whom had first brought him to Gateshead. He played 23 games in the second half of the 2024–25 season, which culminated in the club being relegated out of the Football League. He played 21 league games in the 2025–26 season. He said the club had had "an amazing season" to qualify for the play-offs on 95 points.

== Style of play ==
Whelan is a central midfielder with good short-range passing skills.

== Career statistics ==
As of match played 3 May 2026

Appearances and goals by club, season and competition
Club	Season	League			FA Cup		EFL Cup		Other		Total	
Club	Season	Division	Apps	Goals	Apps	Goals	Apps	Goals	Apps	Goals	Apps	Goals
Manchester United	2018–19	Premier League	0	0	0	0	0	0	0	0	0	0
Port Vale (loan)	2018–19	League Two	0	0	0	0	0	0	0	0	0	0
Watford	2019–20	Premier League	0	0	2	0	0	0	0	0	2	0
Oldham Athletic	2020–21	League Two	31	0	1	0	2	0	4 (Note: Appearance(s) in EFL Trophy)	0	38	0
Oldham Athletic	2021–22	League Two	43	1	2	0	2	0	4	0	51	1
Oldham Athletic	Total		74	1	3	0	4	0	8	0	89	1
Solihull Moors	2022–23	National League	21	0	2	0	—		1 (Note: Appearance(s) in FA Trophy)	0	24	0
Gateshead (loan)	2022–23	National League	13	0	0	0	—		0	0	13	0
Gateshead	2023–24	National League	28	5	1	0	—		4	2	33	7
Gateshead	2024–25	National League	24	6	2	0	—		3 (Note: Appearance(s) in National League Cup)	0	29	6
Gateshead	Total		52	11	3	0	0	0	7	2	62	13
Carlisle United	2024–25	League Two	23	2	0	0	0	0	0	0	23	2
Carlisle United	2025–26	National League	21	0	2	0	—		2 (Note: 1 appearance in FA Trophy, 1 appearance in play-offs)	0	25	0
Carlisle United	2026–27	National League	0	0	0	0	—		0	0	0	0
Carlisle United	Total		44	2	2	0	0	0	2	0	48	2
Career total			204	14	12	0	4	0	18	2	238	16

== Honours ==
Gateshead

- FA Trophy: 2023–24

Individual

- National League Player of the Month: February 2024
