= Vani Da Silva =

English footballer

Personal information
- Full name: Ivanilson Loforte Tique Da Silva
- Date of birth: 27 November 2002 (age 23)
- Height: 6 ft 0 in (1.83 m)
- Position: Forward

Team information
- Current team: Oldham Athletic
- Number: 30

Youth career
- –2019: Bury
- 2019–2020: Oldham Athletic

Senior career*
Years	Team	Apps	(Gls)
2020–2023	Oldham Athletic	3	(0)
2020–2021	→ Curzon Ashton (loan)	2	(0)
2021	→ FC United of Manchester (loan)	3	(0)
2021–2022	→ Ashton United (loan)	0	(0)
2022	→ Witton Albion (loan)	5	(1)
- * Club domestic league appearances and goals as of 21:20, 3 June 2023 (UTC)

Ivanilson Loforte Tique Da Silva (born 27 November 2002) is an English footballer who played as a forward for EFL League Two club Oldham Athletic.

== Career ==
Having previously been at Bury, Da Silva joined Oldham Athletic on a two-year contract in the summer of 2019. He made his senior debut on 5 September 2020 as a substititute in a 3–0 EFL Cup victory at home to Carlisle United. Da Silva joined Curzon Ashton on a month-long loan on 12 December 2020. He made 2 league appearances for Curzon Ashton. In May 2021, Da Silva signed with the club on a professional contract until the end of the calendar year. He was released at the end of the 2022–23 season. He now plays for non league Squires Gate FC in Blackpool.After A Year Of Playing in Baller League He new plays for Droylsden. In the North West Counties Premier Division

== Career statistics ==
As of match played 30 March 2021

Appearances and goals by club, season and competition
Club	Season	League			FA Cup		League Cup		Other		Total	
Club	Season	Division	Apps	Goals	Apps	Goals	Apps	Goals	Apps	Goals	Apps	Goals
Oldham Athletic	2020–21	League Two	0	0	0	0	1	0	1 (Note: Appearance(s) in EFL Trophy)	0	2	0
Curzon Ashton (loan)	2020–21	National League North	2	0	0	0	—		1 (Note: Appearance(s) in FA Trophy)	0	3	0
Career total			2	0	0	0	1	0	2	0	5	0
