= Jack Stobbs =

English footballer (born 1997)

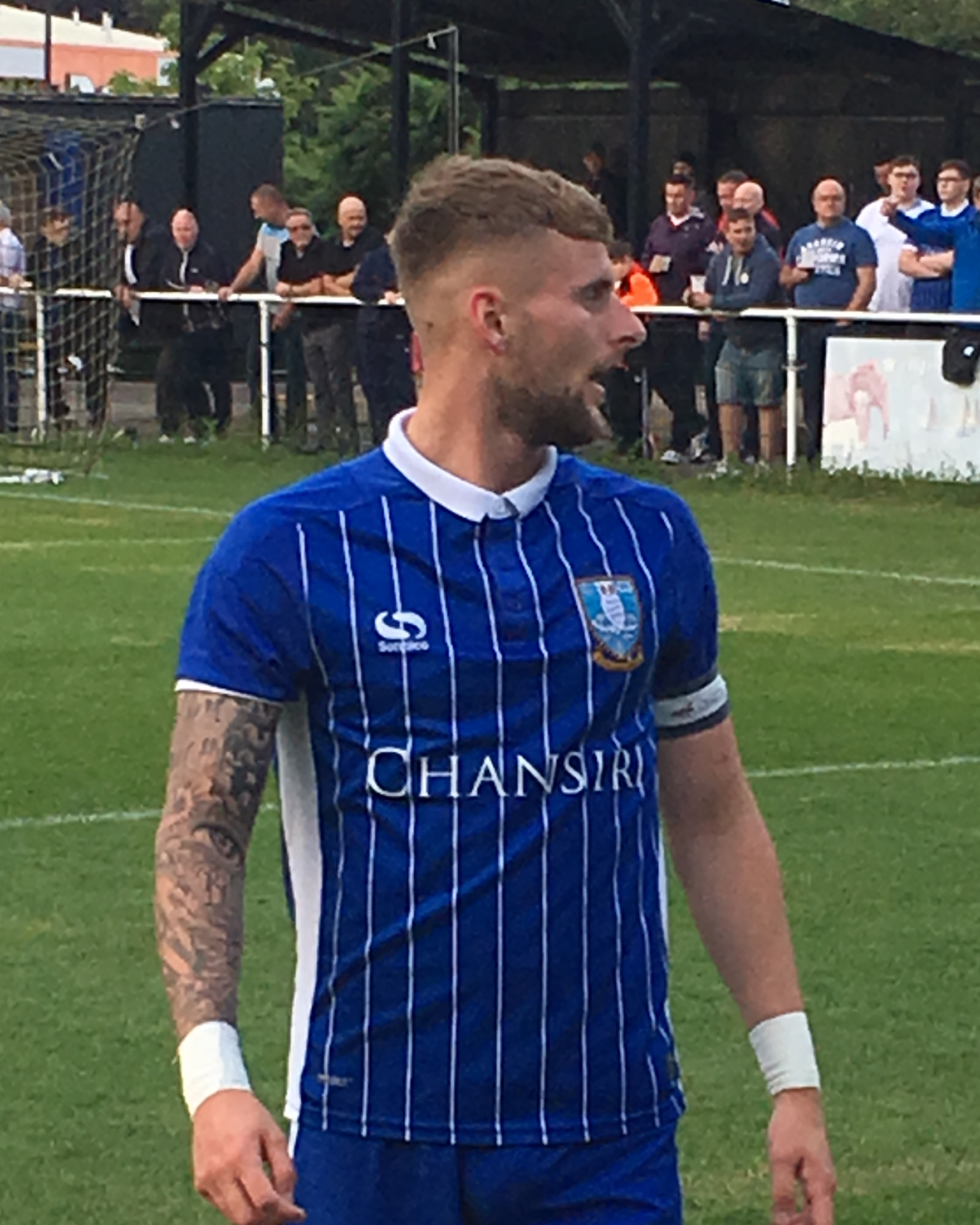
- Stobbs pictured in July 2017.

Personal information
- Full name: Jack Thomas Stobbs
- Date of birth: 27 February 1997 (age 29)
- Place of birth: Leeds, England
- Height: 1.80 m (5 ft 11 in)
- Position: Winger

Team information
- Current team: Curzon Ashton

Youth career
- 2005–2014: Sheffield Wednesday

Senior career*
Years	Team	Apps	(Gls)
2014–2020	Sheffield Wednesday	5	(0)
2017–2018	→ Port Vale (loan)	5	(0)
2019–2020	→ Livingston (loan)	4	(1)
2020–2021	Grantham Town	4	(0)
2021–2023	Oldham Athletic	40	(2)
2023	→ Torquay United (loan)	10	(0)
2023–2024	Torquay United	33	(2)
2024	Buxton	23	(0)
2025	→ Matlock Town (loan)	11	(1)
2025–	Curzon Ashton	33	(3)
- * Club domestic league appearances and goals as of 18:51, 1 May 2026 (UTC)

Jack Thomas Stobbs (born 27 February 1997) is an English footballer who plays as a winger for Northern Premier League Premier Division club Curzon Ashton.

Stobbs turned professional at Sheffield Wednesday in March 2014 and made his first-team debut the following month. He joined Port Vale on loan for the first half of the 2017–18 season and started the 2019–20 season on loan at Scottish club Livingston. After being released by Wednesday, he signed with Grantham Town in October 2020 before returning to the English Football League with Oldham Athletic in August 2021, though Oldham were relegated into non-League at the end of the 2021–22 season. He joined Torquay United on loan in March 2023, in a move made permanent in the summer. He signed with Buxton in June 2024 and was loaned to Matlock Town in February 2025. He joined Curzon Ashton in June 2025.

== Career ==
=== Sheffield Wednesday ===
Stobbs joined the Academy at Sheffield Wednesday at the age of eight and signed his first professional contract with the club in March 2014. He made his senior team debut on 26 April, coming on for Joe Mattock 60 minutes into a 3–1 defeat to Bolton Wanderers at Hillsborough, in what was the final home game of the 2013–14 season. However, he suffered ankle ligament damage in a friendly at Matlock Town in the 2014–15 pre-season, which left him having to regain his fitness to try and force his way into manager Stuart Gray's first-team plans. He had to wait until the last day of the 2015–16 season to make his second appearance for the "Owls", when he came on as a 79th-minute substitute for Atdhe Nuhiu in a 2–1 loss at Wolverhampton Wanderers on 7 May 2016. He signed a new one-year contract in June 2017 after captaining the U23 team to the Professional Development League 2 North title and National Championship in 2016–17.

On 17 August 2017, Stobbs joined newly-relegated EFL League Two club Port Vale on loan for the 2017–18 season; manager Michael Brown said that "[chief scout] Darren Wrack has worked very hard on it and he is a good, exciting, young player". However, he struggled to even appear on the first-team bench, and speaking in October, new manager Neil Aspin blamed league rules that prevented him from naming more than five loanees in a matchday squad. He was recalled by Wednesday on 2 January 2018. New Wednesday manager Jos Luhukay put him into the first-team and gave him a new 2 1/2-year contract. He featured in one EFL Cup game in the 2018–19 season.

On 20 August 2019, he joined Scottish Premiership side Livingston on loan until 1 January. He scored on his "Lions" debut, his first in professional football, in a 4–1 victory at Ross County on 24 August. The strike was later named as the best goal in Scottish football of the 2019–20 season by the Glasgow Times. However, injury restricted him to just further three appearances in the remainder of his spell at the Almondvale Stadium and he was released by Wednesday at the end of the 2019–20 campaign; he was informed of his release via Zoom due to the COVID-19 pandemic in England. Stobbs said that he was upset at being released after 17 years in such circumstances but understood it was necessary due to the government's pandemic regulations; he went on to comment that "He (Garry Monk) had not seen me play and I had not trained with them due to being up there (Livingston), so he didn't really know anything about me. I had hoped to come back and be involved more than I was but it didn't work out like that.

=== Grantham Town ===
On 15 October 2020, Stobbs joined Northern Premier League Premier Division club Grantham Town. He played six games before the 2020–21 season was curtailed early due to the ongoing pandemic.

=== Oldham Athletic ===
On 4 August 2021, Stobbs joined League Two side Oldham Athletic on a one-year contract following a lengthy trial period; "Latics" boss Keith Curle said that "he is one of the most committed players I have ever come across". He played 33 times during the 2021–22 campaign that saw the club relegated out of the English Football League after 115 years and was one of only two players to be offered a new contract by manager John Sheridan. This new deal was accepted by Stobbs and signed in June 2022.

=== Torquay United ===
On 14 March 2023, Stobbs joined fellow National League side Torquay United on loan until the end of the 2022–23 season; he had impressed manager Gary Johnson in a game against Torquay earlier in the season. At the end of the season, Torquay were relegated to the National League South, and he returned to Oldham, where he was released. On 11 May 2023, it was announced that he would be returning to Torquay United on a one-year deal upon the expiration of his contract with Oldham Athletic. Supporters voted him as the club's Player of the Month for September 2023 after he scored two goals in FA Cup qualification matches. He ended the 2023–24 season with three goals in 36 games before being released.

=== Buxton ===
On 19 June 2024, Stobbs joined National League North side Buxton. He featured 24 times in the first half of the 2024–25 campaign. On 17 February 2025, Stobbs joined Northern Premier League Premier Division side Matlock Town on loan for the remainder of the 2024–25 season. He played eleven games for the club, scoring one goal and being sent off once.

=== Curzon Ashton ===
On 21 June 2025, Stobbs joined Curzon Ashton of the National League North. He played 33 league games in the 2025–26 season, which ended in relegation.

== Style of play ==
Speaking in August 2014, Sheffield Wednesday manager Stuart Gray said that Stobbs is "one of those who runs at defenders in one-versus-one situations, and he's got a great habit of putting the ball between the posts for someone to score". Stobbs himself stated that "I've got a bit of pace and I like to take people on, I like to get to the byline, get crosses into the box and, where I can, I try to get a few goals".

== Career statistics ==
As of match played 25 April 2026

Appearances and goals by club, season and competition
Club	Season	League			FA Cup		EFL Cup		Other		Total	
Club	Season	Division	Apps	Goals	Apps	Goals	Apps	Goals	Apps	Goals	Apps	Goals
Sheffield Wednesday	2013–14	Championship	1	0	0	0	0	0	—		1	0
Sheffield Wednesday	2014–15	Championship	0	0	0	0	0	0	—		0	0
Sheffield Wednesday	2015–16	Championship	1	0	0	0	0	0	—		1	0
Sheffield Wednesday	2016–17	Championship	0	0	0	0	0	0	0	0	0	0
Sheffield Wednesday	2017–18	Championship	3	0	0	0	0	0	—		3	0
Sheffield Wednesday	2018–19	Championship	0	0	0	0	1	0	—		1	0
Sheffield Wednesday	2019–20	Championship	0	0	0	0	0	0	—		0	0
Sheffield Wednesday	Total		5	0	0	0	1	0	0	0	6	0
Port Vale (loan)	2017–18	League Two	5	0	1	0	0	0	2 (Note: Appearances in the EFL Trophy)	0	8	0
Livingston (loan)	2019–20	Scottish Premiership	4	1	—		—		—		4	1
Grantham Town	2020–21	Northern Premier League; Premier Division	4	0	0	0	—		2 (Note: Appearances in the FA Trophy)	0	6	0
Oldham Athletic	2021–22	League Two	30	2	0	0	2	0	1	0	33	2
Oldham Athletic	2022–23	National League	10	0	1	0	—		0	0	11	0
Oldham Athletic	Total		40	2	1	0	2	0	1	0	44	2
Torquay United (loan)	2022–23	National League	10	0	0	0	—		0	0	10	0
Torquay United	2023–24	National League South	33	2	3	2	—		0	0	36	4
Torquay United	Total		43	2	3	2	0	0	0	0	46	4
Buxton	2024–25	National League North	23	0	0	0	—		1	0	24	0
Matlock Town (loan)	2024–25	Northern Premier League; Premier Division	11	1	—		—		—		11	1
Curzon Ashton	2025–26	National League North	33	3	0	0	—		0	0	33	3
Curzon Ashton	2026–27	National League North	0	0	0	0	—		0	0	0	0
Curzon Ashton	Total		33	3	0	0	0	0	0	0	33	3
Career total			168	9	5	2	3	0	6	0	182	11
