= Kyle Jameson =

English footballer (born 1998)

Personal information
- Full name: Kyle Alexander Jameson
- Date of birth: 11 September 1998 (age 28)
- Place of birth: Urmston, England
- Height: 6 ft 0 in (1.83 m)
- Position: Central defender

Team information
- Current team: Morecambe
- Number: 12

Youth career
- Southport
- 2017: Chelsea
- 2017–2018: West Bromwich Albion

Senior career*
Years	Team	Apps	(Gls)
2018–2019	West Bromwich Albion	0	(0)
2018–2019	→ Barrow (loan)	25	(1)
2019–2020	AFC Fylde	19	(0)
2020–2022	Oldham Athletic	36	(2)
2022–2023	Tranmere Rovers	10	(0)
2023–2025	Newport County	42	(1)
2025–2026	Harrogate Town	5	(0)
2026–	Morecambe	14	(0)
- * Club domestic league appearances and goals as of 20:30, 2 June 2026 (UTC)

Kyle Alexander Jameson (born 11 September 1998) is an English professional footballer who plays as a centre back for National League North club Morecambe.

== Career ==
=== Youth ===
Born in Urmston, Jameson spent his early career with Southport, signing for Chelsea in January 2017.

=== West Bromwich Albion ===
Jameson moved to West Bromwich Albion in August 2017, and spent a loan spell at Barrow during the 2018–19 season,

=== AFC Fylde ===
Jameson signed for AFC Fylde in May 2019. He left Fylde in August 2020 after his contract was mutually terminated.

=== Oldham Athletic ===
On 1 September 2020, he signed for Oldham Athletic. Jameson was released following relegation at the end of the 2021–22 season.

=== Tranmere Rovers ===
Jameson signed a one-year contract with Tranmere Rovers on 13 July 2022. On 9 May 2023 the club announced he would be released at the end of his contract.

=== Newport County ===
Despite interest from Scottish side Livingston in June 2023, it was announced that Jameson would sign a two-year contract with EFL League Two club Newport County on 1 July 2023. He made his debut for Newport on 5 August 2023 in the starting line-up against Accrington Stanley. On 15 August 2023 after just two league matches for Newport, Jameson was ruled out with an injury until January 2024. Jameson scored his first goal for Newport in the 2-0 League 2 win against AFC Wimbledon on 16 March 2024. He was released by Newport County at the end of the 2024-25 season.

=== Harrogate Town ===
In November 2025, he signed for Harrogate Town on a short-term contract. He departed the club on 21 January upon the expiry of his deal.

=== Morecambe ===
On 14 February 2026, Jameson joined National League club Morecambe on a deal until the end of the season. On 16 May 2026, Morecambe announced he was being released.

== Career statistics ==
As of 10 January 2026

Club	Season	League			FA Cup		EFL Cup		Other		Total	
Club	Season	Division	Apps	Goals	Apps	Goals	Apps	Goals	Apps	Goals	Apps	Goals
West Bromwich Albion	2018–19	Premier League	0	0	0	0	0	0	0	0	0	0
Barrow (loan)	2018–19	National League	25	1	0	0	0	0	0	0	25	1
AFC Fylde	2019–20	National League	19	0	1	0	0	0	4 (Note: Appearances in the FA Trophy.)	0	24	0
Oldham Athletic	2020–21	League Two	25	2	1	0	0	0	1 (Note: Appearance(s) in the EFL Trophy.)	0	27	2
Oldham Athletic	2021–22	League Two	11	0	0	0	2	0	2	0	15	0
Oldham Athletic	Total		36	2	1	0	2	0	3	0	42	2
Tranmere Rovers	2022–23	League Two	10	0	1	0	1	0	2	0	14	0
Newport County	2023–24	League Two	18	1	0	0	1	0	0	0	19	1
Newport County	2024–25	League Two	24	0	1	0	1	0	3	0	29	0
Newport County	Total		42	1	1	0	2	0	3	0	48	1
Harrogate Town	2025–26	League Two	5	0	0	0	0	0	0	0	5	0
Career total			137	4	4	0	5	0	12	0	158	4
