= Dylan Bahamboula =

Association football player (born 1995)

Personal information
- Full name: Dylan Ozan Moyo Bahamboula
- Date of birth: 22 May 1995 (age 31)
- Place of birth: Corbeil-Essonnes, France
- Height: 1.85 m (6 ft 1 in)
- Position: Attacking midfielder

Team information
- Current team: Saint-Pauloise

Youth career
- 2005–2010: Linas-Montlhéry
- 2010–2014: Monaco

Senior career*
Years	Team	Apps	(Gls)
2012–2016	Monaco B	46	(7)
2015–2016	→ Paris FC (loan)	29	(4)
2016–2018	Dijon	15	(1)
2016–2018	Dijon B	12	(1)
2018	→ Gazélec Ajaccio (loan)	13	(1)
2018	Astra Giurgiu	5	(1)
2019	CS Constantine	13	(2)
2019–2020	Tsarsko Selo	17	(2)
2020–2022	Oldham Athletic	68	(9)
2022–2024	Livingston	20	(1)
2024	Busaiteen Club		
2024–2024	Saint-Pauloise		

International career
2015	France U20	2	(0)
2017–2024	Congo	11	(0)
- * Club domestic league appearances and goals as of 11:04, 23 May 2022 (UTC)

Dylan Ozan Moyo Bahamboula (born 22 May 1995) is a professional footballer who plays as an attacking midfielder. Born in France, he represents the Republic of the Congo at international level.

== Club career ==
Bahamboula began his career in the Monaco academy, making 46 appearances for the B-Team. In July 2016, Bahamboula moved from Monaco to Dijon.

In January 2019 he signed for Algerian club CS Constantine.

He joined Bulgarian side Tsarsko Selo in October 2019, scoring two league goals for the club in 17 appearances, one of them coming in the prestigious 2:1 win over CSKA Sofia, before leaving the team in August 2020.

In October 2020 he signed for English club Oldham Athletic. Following the club's relegation to the National League, Bahamboula was released at the end of the 2021–22 season.

On 9 July 2022, Bahamboula signed a two-year contract with Scottish Premiership club Livingston. Bahamboula was released during the January 2024 transfer window after making 27 appearances in all competitions, scoring once.

Following his release from Livi, he signed for Bahraini club Busaiteen Club in January 2024. He left the club at the end of the 2023–2024 season. Shortly afterwards, he signed for French side Saint-Pauloise.

== International career ==
Bahamboula was born in France to parents of Congolese descent. Bahamboula was a youth international for France. He was called up to the Republic of the Congo national football team in 2015.

Bahamboula made his senior debut for the Republic of the Congo in a 3–1 2019 Africa Cup of Nations qualification loss to the DR Congo on 10 June 2017.

== Personal life ==
Dylan is the younger brother of the French former footballer and current rapper Plaisir Bahamboula, known by his stage name as OhPlai.
