= List of Oldham Athletic A.F.C. players (1–24 appearances) =

This is a list of footballers who have made between 1 and 24 competitive appearances for Oldham Athletic A.F.C. since the club joined the football league in 1907.

| Name | Nationality | Position | Club career | League apps | League goals | Total apps | Total goals | Notes |
|---|---|---|---|---|---|---|---|---|
| Joe Stafford | England | DF | 1907 | 1 | 0 | 1 | 0 | |
| Jimmy Swarbrick | England | MF | 1907-1908 | 4 | 2 | 4 | 2 | |
| Jack Shufflebotham | England | DF | 1907-1909 | 7 | 1 | 8 | 1 | |
| Bill Bottomley | England | MF | 1907-1908 | 13 | 0 | 13 | 0 | |
| Billy Dodds | England | FW | 1907 | 13 | 3 | 13 | 3 | |
| Wilkie Ward | England | MF | 1907-1908 | 15 | 1 | 15 | 1 | |
| Matt Brunton | England | FW | 1908 | 1 | 0 | 1 | 0 | |
| Paddy Stokes | England | MF | 1908 | 2 | 1 | 2 | 1 | |
| Bill Wright | England | GK | 1908 | 3 | 0 | 3 | 0 | |
| Bill Appleyard | England | FW | 1908 | 4 | 0 | 4 | 0 | |
| Jimmy Reid | Scotland | MF | 1908-1910 | 5 | 2 | 5 | 2 | |
| Jack Dodds | England | MF | 1908-1909 | 8 | 0 | 8 | 0 | |
| Willie Andrews | Ireland | MF | 1908-1909 | 9 | 3 | 9 | 3 | |
| Elijah Round | England | GK | 1908-1909 | 10 | 0 | 10 | 0 | |
| Herbert Butterworth | England | MF | 1908-1910 | 12 | 0 | 12 | 0 | |
| Harry Watts | England | FW | 1908-1909 | 13 | 4 | 13 | 4 | |
| Finlay Speedie | Scotland | FW | 1908-1909 | 15 | 6 | 17 | 6 | |
| Jack West | England | FW | 1909 | 1 | 0 | 1 | 0 | |
| Tom Pennington | England | GK | 1909 | 1 | 0 | 1 | 0 | |
| John Mitchell | Scotland | FW | 1909 | 4 | 1 | 4 | 1 | |
| Bob Carmichael | Scotland | FW | 1909 | 6 | 1 | 6 | 1 | |
| Bill Martin | England | FW | 1909 | 7 | 0 | 7 | 0 | |
| George Shaw | England | MF | 1909 | 10 | 1 | 10 | 1 | |
| John McTavish | Scotland | FW | 1910 | 10 | 0 | 10 | 0 | |
| Jack Hardman | England | MF | 1911 | 2 | 0 | 2 | 0 | |
| George Salley | England | DF | 1911 | 3 | 0 | 3 | 0 | |
| Sam Pilkington | England | MF | 1911 | 5 | 0 | 5 | 0 | |
| Tom Marrison | England | FW | 1911 | 17 | 4 | 17 | 4 | |
| Clare Wilson | England | MF | 1911-1913 | 21 | 0 | 22 | 0 | |
| Walter Davies | Wales | FW | 1912 | 10 | 3 | 10 | 3 | |
| Albert Franks | England | MF | 1913 | 1 | 0 | 1 | 0 | |
| Val Lawrence | Scotland | MF | 1913 | 1 | 0 | 1 | 0 | |
| Ellis Hollis | England | MF | 1913 | 2 | 0 | 2 | 0 | |
| George Joynson | England | FW | 1913-1914 | 5 | 0 | 5 | 0 | |
| Jimmy Broad | England | FW | 1914-1915 | 15 | 5 | 15 | 5 | |
| Arthur Cashmore | England | FW | 1914-1915 | 16 | 8 | 21 | 9 | |
| Hugh Lester | United States | DF | 1915 | 1 | 0 | 1 | 0 | |
| Albert Chadderton | England | DF | 1919 | 1 | 0 | 1 | 0 | |
| Tommy Cunliffe | England | MF | 1919 | 2 | 0 | 2 | 0 | |
| Edgar Smithurst | England | MF | 1919 | 2 | 0 | 2 | 0 | |
| Charles Hemsley | England | FW | 1919-1920 | 5 | 1 | 5 | 1 | |
| Danny Hooper | England | DF | 1919-1920 | 5 | 0 | 5 | 0 | |
| Tom Jones | Wales | FW | 1919 | 10 | 2 | 10 | 2 | |
| Alf Dolphin | England | MF | 1919-1920 | 16 | 0 | 16 | 0 | |
| Joe Dougherty | England | MF | 1919-1920 | 15 | 5 | 16 | 5 | |
| Jimmy Thompson | England | MF | 1920 | 2 | 0 | 2 | 0 | |
| Dick Carlisle | England | DF | 1920 | 5 | 0 | 5 | 0 | |
| Bill Hooper | England | FW | 1920 | 5 | 1 | 6 | 1 | |
| George Burrows | England | FW | 1920 | 7 | 1 | 8 | 1 | |
| Peter Bell | England | MF | 1920-1922 | 18 | 2 | 18 | 2 | |
| Alex Paterson | Scotland | FW | 1921 | 1 | 0 | 1 | 0 | |
| Harry Parkinson | England | FW | 1921 | 2 | 0 | 2 | 0 | |
| Tommy Edge | England | MF | 1921 | 3 | 0 | 3 | 0 | |
| John Nord | England | MF | 1921 | 3 | 0 | 3 | 0 | |
| Tom Byrom | England | FW | 1921 | 5 | 0 | 5 | 0 | |
| Vince Foweather | England | FW | 1921 | 5 | 1 | 6 | 1 | |
| Jim Carrick | England | DF | 1921-1922 | 6 | 0 | 6 | 0 | |
| Ernie Braidwood | England | MF | 1921-1922 | 10 | 1 | 10 | 1 | |
| Billy Broadbent | England | MF | 1921-1923 | 12 | 1 | 12 | 1 | |
| Fred Broadbent | England | FW | 1921-1923 | 12 | 4 | 14 | 7 | |
| Bill Toms | Ireland | FW | 1921-1922 | 20 | 5 | 20 | 5 | |
| George Waddell | Scotland | FW | 1922 | 1 | 0 | 1 | 0 | |
| David Spence | Scotland | MF | 1922-1923 | 4 | 0 | 4 | 0 | |
| George King | England | FW | 1922-1923 | 4 | 1 | 5 | 1 | |
| Arthur Cooper | England | GK | 1922-1923 | 9 | 0 | 9 | 0 | |
| Jonty Yarwood | England | DF | 1922-1923 | 11 | 0 | 11 | 0 | |
| Billy Hibbert | England | FW | 1922-1923 | 16 | 4 | 17 | 4 | |
| Harry Horrocks | England | FW | 1922-1924 | 23 | 2 | 23 | 2 | |
| William Wood | England | FW | 1922-1923 | 24 | 4 | 24 | 4 | |
| Billy Fergusson | England | FW | 1923 | 5 | 1 | 5 | 1 | |
| Tommy Fleetwood | England | DF | 1923-1924 | 5 | 0 | 5 | 0 | |
| Archie Longmuir | Scotland | MF | 1923-1924 | 22 | 4 | 22 | 4 | |
| Harry Middleton | England | MF | 1923-1926 | 22 | 0 | 22 | 0 | |
| Billy Howson | England | FW | 1923-1924 | 21 | 5 | 23 | 5 | |
| James Glennie | Scotland | DF | 1924 | 1 | 0 | 1 | 0 | |
| Harry Broome | England | FW | 1924 | 4 | 0 | 4 | 0 | |
| John Carroll | England | FW | 1924 | 7 | 2 | 7 | 2 | |
| Jack Keedwell | England | FW | 1924-1925 | 16 | 4 | 16 | 4 | |
| Harry Wilkinson | England | DF | 1924-1926 | 17 | 0 | 17 | 0 | |
| George Walker | England | DF | 1925 | 2 | 0 | 2 | 0 | |
| Jack Scholfield | England | FW | 1925-1926 | 4 | 1 | 4 | 1 | |
| Bob Scholes | England | FW | 1925 | 5 | 0 | 5 | 0 | |
| Cornelius White | England | FW | 1925 | 5 | 0 | 5 | 0 | |
| Ernie Kirkpatrick | England | FW | 1925-1926 | 15 | 4 | 15 | 4 | |
| John McCue | England | DF | 1926 | 1 | 0 | 1 | 0 | |
| Roger Seddon | England | MF | 1926 | 1 | 0 | 1 | 0 | |
| Edgar Colman | England | GK | 1926 | 2 | 0 | 2 | 0 | |
| Alf Jennings | England | MF | 1926 | 2 | 0 | 2 | 0 | |
| Norman Crompton | England | DF | 1926-1928 | 9 | 0 | 9 | 0 | |
| Ben Brelsforth | England | DF | 1926-1928 | 9 | 0 | 10 | 0 | |
| Charlie Hey | England | MF | 1926-1927, 1929 | 11 | 1 | 11 | 1 | |
| John Hardy | England | DF | 1927 | 2 | 0 | 2 | 0 | |
| Harold Gough | England | GK | 1927 | 4 | 0 | 4 | 0 | |
| Walter Trotter | England | MF | 1927-1928 | 5 | 1 | 5 | 1 | |
| Maurice Wellock | England | FW | 1927 | 5 | 6 | 5 | 6 | |
| Arden Maddison | England | MF | 1927-1929 | 6 | 0 | 7 | 0 | |
| Cliff Stanton | England | FW | 1927-1928 | 18 | 5 | 19 | 6 | |
| Harry Stafford | England | DF | 1928, 1932-1933 | 17 | 0 | 18 | 0 | |
| Jack Prince | England | GK | 1928 | 1 | 0 | 1 | 0 | |
| Cliff Foster | England | MF | 1928 | 1 | 0 | 1 | 0 | |
| Harry Green | England | MF | 1928 | 1 | 0 | 1 | 0 | |
| Tom Kellard | England | MF | 1928 | 2 | 0 | 2 | 0 | |
| Ted Malpas | England | DF | 1928 | 3 | 0 | 3 | 0 | |
| Peter Floyd | England | GK | 1928-1929 | 3 | 0 | 3 | 0 | |
| Ellis Jones | England | FW | 1928 | 7 | 3 | 7 | 3 | |
| Jack Lowe | England | MF | 1928 | 7 | 2 | 7 | 2 | |
| Howard Baker | England | GK | 1929 | 1 | 0 | 1 | 0 | |
| Billy Murphy | England | MF | 1929 | 2 | 1 | 2 | 1 | |
| Tom Smelt | England | FW | 1929 | 2 | 0 | 2 | 0 | |
| Joe Taylor | England | FW | 1929-1931 | 12 | 7 | 13 | 7 | |
| Billy Thomas | England | MF | 1929-1933 | 22 | 0 | 23 | 0 | |
| Fred Kennedy | England | FW | 1930 | 5 | 0 | 5 | 0 | |
| Bert Burridge | England | MF | 1930-1931 | 6 | 0 | 6 | 0 | |
| Fred Fitton | England | FW | 1930-1931 | 9 | 4 | 10 | 5 | |
| Fred Flavell | England | FW | 1931 | 4 | 0 | 4 | 0 | |
| Jimmy Hope | England | MF | 1931 | 4 | 0 | 4 | 0 | |
| Austin Trippier | England | MF | 1931 | 6 | 1 | 6 | 1 | |
| Jack Martin | England | DF | 1931-1932 | 11 | 1 | 13 | 1 | |
| Jack Roscoe | England | FW | 1931-1932 | 19 | 8 | 21 | 8 | |
| Harold Brown | Unknown | MF | 1932 | 1 | 1 | 1 | 1 | |
| Jack Hallam | England | MF | 1932 | 1 | 0 | 1 | 0 | |
| Alan Millward | England | GK | 1932 | 1 | 0 | 1 | 0 | |
| Llewellyn Purcell | England | FW | 1932 | 1 | 0 | 1 | 0 | |
| Billy Boswell | England | FW | 1932 | 2 | 1 | 2 | 1 | |
| Benny Jones | England | FW | 1932 | 2 | 0 | 2 | 0 | |
| Ernie Steele | England | MF | 1932-1933 | 14 | 1 | 14 | 1 | |
| Leslie Smalley | England | MF | 1932 | 20 | 5 | 20 | 5 | |
| Bill Baldwin | England | FW | 1933 | 1 | 0 | 1 | 0 | |
| Frank Ridings | England | FW | 1933 | 2 | 0 | 2 | 0 | |
| George Pateman | England | FW | 1933-1934 | 7 | 3 | 7 | 3 | |
| Jimmy Dickenson | England | MF | 1933-1934 | 6 | 0 | 8 | 0 | |
| Cliff Chadwick | England | MF | 1933-1934 | 18 | 6 | 21 | 6 | |
| Frank Britton | England | MF | 1934 | 1 | 0 | 1 | 0 | |
| Arthur Sharp | England | FW | 1934 | 1 | 0 | 1 | 0 | |
| Tom Devlin | Scotland | FW | 1934 | 2 | 0 | 2 | 0 | |
| George Talbot | England | GK | 1934 | 2 | 0 | 2 | 0 | |
| Billy Jeavons | England | MF | 1934 | 3 | 1 | 3 | 1 | |
| John Murphy | Scotland | FW | 1934-1935 | 7 | 3 | 7 | 3 | |
| Harry Spink | England | MF | 1934 | 20 | 1 | 20 | 1 | |
| Norrie Alden | Wales | FW | 1935 | 1 | 0 | 1 | 0 | |
| Jack Shaw | England | MF | 1935 | 2 | 0 | 2 | 0 | |
| Charlie Whyte | Scotland | MF | 1935 | 2 | 0 | 2 | 0 | |
| John Richardson | England | MF | 1935 | 3 | 0 | 3 | 0 | |
| Bill Ridding | England | FW | 1935 | 3 | 0 | 3 | 0 | |
| Bill Chambers | England | FW | 1935 | 10 | 2 | 11 | 3 | |
| Robert Talbot | England | DF | 1935-1936 | 13 | 0 | 13 | 0 | |
| Charlie Butler | Wales | MF | 1935-1936 | 13 | 0 | 15 | 1 | |
| Cliff Eaton | England | FW | 1936-1938 | 2 | 0 | 3 | 0 | |
| Joe Wiggins | England | FW | 1936-1937 | 3 | 0 | 3 | 0 | |
| Bob Foster | England | GK | 1936-1937 | 10 | 0 | 11 | 0 | |
| Jack Aspinall | England | MF | 1936-1938 | 11 | 0 | 13 | 0 | |
| John Clarke | England | MF | 1937 | 1 | 1 | 1 | 1 | |
| Sid Jones | England | MF | 1937 | 1 | 0 | 1 | 0 | |
| Fred Sinkinson | England | MF | 1937 | 2 | 0 | 2 | 0 | |
| Fred Valentine | England | MF | 1937 | 5 | 0 | 5 | 0 | |
| Andy Paterson | England | MF | 1937-1939 | 21 | 1 | 23 | 1 | |
| Alwyn Fielden | England | FW | 1938 | 1 | 1 | 1 | 1 | |
| John Heaton | England | MF | 1938 | 2 | 1 | 2 | 1 | |
| Joe Taylor | England | MF | 1938-1939 | 13 | 6 | 15 | 6 | |
| Frank Eckersley | England | GK | 1939 | 1 | 0 | 1 | 0 | |
| Tom Jones | England | DF | 1939 | 1 | 0 | 1 | 0 | |
| Bill Vallance | Scotland | FW | 1939 | 1 | 0 | 2 | 1 | |
| Albert Valentine | England | FW | 1939 | 2 | 1 | 3 | 1 | |
| Norman Standring | England | FW | 1945 | 0 | 0 | 2 | 2 | |
| Eddie Chapman | England | FW | 1945 | 0 | 0 | 4 | 2 | |
| Alan Marlor | England | DF | 1945 | 0 | 0 | 4 | 0 | |
| Mark Radcliffe | England | GK | 1945 | 0 | 0 | 4 | 0 | |
| Tom West | England | FW | 1945-1947 | 0 | 0 | 4 | 2 | |
| Harry Tilling | England | MF | 1945-1947 | 3 | 0 | 5 | 0 | |
| Les Goodwin | England | MF | 1945-1947 | 7 | 0 | 8 | 0 | |
| Bill Lawton | England | MF | 1945-1949 | 10 | 0 | 17 | 1 | |
| Norman Wood | England | MF | 1946 | 1 | 0 | 1 | 0 | |
| Harry Haslam | England | DF | 1946 | 2 | 0 | 2 | 0 | |
| Frank Herbert | England | MF | 1946 | 4 | 0 | 4 | 0 | |
| Jack Cutting | England | FW | 1946 | 4 | 1 | 5 | 1 | |
| Bill Waite | Wales | FW | 1946-1947 | 4 | 4 | 5 | 4 | |
| Dick Witham | England | DF | 1946 | 5 | 0 | 5 | 0 | |
| Jack Sawbridge | England | GK | 1946-1947 | 8 | 0 | 8 | 0 | |
| Dennis Wright | England | MF | 1947, 1951-1952 | 9 | 0 | 9 | 0 | |
| John Divers | Scotland | FW | 1947 | 1 | 0 | 1 | 0 | |
| Tom Dowker | England | MF | 1947 | 1 | 0 | 1 | 0 | |
| Sam Walker | England | DF | 1947 | 1 | 0 | 1 | 0 | |
| Jack Koffman | England | MF | 1947 | 3 | 0 | 3 | 0 | |
| Bill Pollock | Scotland | MF | 1947 | 4 | 0 | 4 | 0 | |
| Ken Armitage | England | DF | 1947-1948 | 5 | 0 | 5 | 0 | |
| Malcolm Schofield | England | GK | 1947 | 7 | 0 | 7 | 0 | |
| Tom Parnaby | England | FW | 1947 | 7 | 1 | 7 | 1 | |
| Jack Fryer | England | FW | 1947-1948 | 9 | 3 | 9 | 3 | |
| Johnny Milne | Scotland | DF | 1947-1948 | 13 | 0 | 13 | 0 | |
| Norman Smith | England | FW | 1948 | 1 | 0 | 1 | 0 | |
| Ronnie Birkett | England | MF | 1948 | 4 | 0 | 4 | 0 | |
| Edmund Stringer | England | FW | 1949 | 1 | 0 | 1 | 0 | |
| Don Ramsey | England | MF | 1949 | 2 | 0 | 2 | 0 | |
| Ted Clamp | England | GK | 1949-1950 | 3 | 0 | 3 | 0 | |
| Jimmy Hutchinson | England | FW | 1949 | 14 | 3 | 14 | 3 | |
| Frank McCormack | Scotland | DF | 1949-1950 | 14 | 0 | 16 | 0 | |
| George Bradshaw | England | GK | 1950 | 1 | 0 | 1 | 0 | |
| Charles Campbell | Scotland | MF | 1950 | 2 | 0 | 2 | 0 | |
| Kevin Walsh | England | MF | 1950 | 3 | 0 | 3 | 0 | |
| Alf Lee | England | MF | 1950-1951 | 3 | 1 | 3 | 1 | |
| Ernie Swallow | England | DF | 1950 | 6 | 0 | 6 | 0 | |
| Alan Ball | England | FW | 1950-1951 | 7 | 1 | 7 | 1 | |
| Jeff Williams | England | FW | 1951 | 1 | 0 | 1 | 0 | |
| Dennis Grainger | England | MF | 1951 | 3 | 0 | 4 | 0 | |
| Bob Whelan | England | MF | 1952 | 1 | 0 | 1 | 0 | |
| Eddie Hopkinson | England | GK | 1952 | 3 | 0 | 3 | 0 | |
| Pat Broadley | Scotland | MF | 1952 | 4 | 0 | 4 | 0 | |
| Tommy Johnston | Scotland | FW | 1952 | 5 | 3 | 5 | 3 | |
| Harry Houlahan | England | FW | 1952-1953 | 6 | 3 | 6 | 3 | |
| Harry Jackson | England | FW | 1952-1955 | 10 | 1 | 10 | 1 | |
| Ian Crawford | Scotland | FW | 1952-1953 | 24 | 8 | 24 | 8 | |
| Derek Lewin | England | FW | 1953-1954 | 10 | 1 | 10 | 1 | |
| Joe Brunskill | England | FW | 1954-1955 | 12 | 2 | 12 | 2 | |
| Jimmy O'Donnell | Scotland | FW | 1954-1956 | 15 | 3 | 16 | 3 | |
| Dennis King | England | MF | 1954-1956 | 22 | 7 | 22 | 7 | |
| Leo Burns | England | MF | 1955-1956 | 4 | 0 | 4 | 0 | |
| Sammy Anderson | England | DF | 1955-1957 | 6 | 0 | 6 | 0 | |
| Ron Garland | England | FW | 1955-1956 | 9 | 3 | 10 | 3 | |
| Harry Sharratt | England | GK | 1956 | 1 | 0 | 1 | 0 | |
| Eddie Hartley | England | MF | 1956 | 1 | 0 | 1 | 0 | |
| Norman Jackson | England | DF | 1956 | 2 | 0 | 2 | 0 | |
| Alan Ross | England | GK | 1956 | 3 | 0 | 3 | 0 | |
| George Outhwaite | England | GK | 1956 | 4 | 0 | 4 | 0 | |
| Laurie Cassidy | England | FW | 1956-1957 | 4 | 1 | 4 | 1 | |
| Trevor Lawless | England | DF | 1956-1957 | 9 | 0 | 9 | 0 | |
| Fred Worthington | England | FW | 1956-1957 | 10 | 1 | 11 | 1 | |
| John Ferguson | Scotland | MF | 1957 | 1 | 0 | 1 | 0 | |
| Tom Dryburgh | Scotland | MF | 1957 | 1 | 0 | 1 | 0 | |
| Ray Fox | England | MF | 1957 | 1 | 0 | 1 | 0 | |
| George Sharp | England | MF | 1957 | 1 | 0 | 1 | 0 | |
| Terry Crossley | England | MF | 1957-1958 | 2 | 1 | 2 | 1 | |
| Trevor Hitchen | England | MF | 1957 | 3 | 0 | 3 | 0 | |
| Arthur Stenner | England | MF | 1957 | 3 | 0 | 3 | 0 | |
| George Torrance | Scotland | GK | 1957 | 4 | 0 | 4 | 0 | |
| Bill Farmer | England | GK | 1957 | 5 | 0 | 5 | 0 | |
| Len Gaynor | England | FW | 1957 | 5 | 0 | 5 | 0 | |
| Tommy Wright | Scotland | MF | 1957 | 7 | 2 | 7 | 2 | |
| Eddie Shimwell | England | DF | 1957 | 7 | 0 | 7 | 0 | |
| Len Stephenson | England | FW | 1957 | 8 | 0 | 8 | 0 | |
| Eric Over | England | MF | 1957-1958 | 21 | 2 | 21 | 2 | |
| Les Melville | England | MF | 1958 | 2 | 0 | 2 | 0 | |
| Stan Smith | England | FW | 1958 | 4 | 0 | 4 | 0 | |
| Ronnie Clark | Scotland | MF | 1958 | 4 | 0 | 4 | 0 | |
| Roy Player | England | DF | 1959-1960 | 2 | 0 | 2 | 0 | |
| Bernard McCready | Scotland | GK | 1959 | 7 | 0 | 7 | 0 | |
| Peter Corbett | England | GK | 1959-1960 | 10 | 0 | 10 | 0 | |
| Bert Scott | Scotland | MF | 1959-1960 | 9 | 1 | 11 | 1 | |
| George Walters | Scotland | MF | 1959-1960 | 13 | 2 | 16 | 3 | |
| Stuart Richardson | England | MF | 1959-1960 | 22 | 0 | 23 | 0 | |
| Kevin McCurley | England | FW | 1960 | 1 | 0 | 1 | 0 | |
| Barry Smith | England | FW | 1960 | 1 | 0 | 1 | 0 | |
| George White | England | DF | 1960 | 1 | 0 | 1 | 0 | |
| John Marsh | England | FW | 1960 | 2 | 0 | 2 | 0 | |
| Eric Davis | England | FW | 1960 | 2 | 1 | 2 | 1 | |
| Roy Warhurst | England | MF | 1960 | 8 | 0 | 8 | 0 | |
| Sandy Wann | Scotland | MF | 1960-1961 | 19 | 0 | 19 | 0 | |
| John Hardie | Scotland | GK | 1960-1961 | 17 | 0 | 22 | 0 | |
| Bob Rackley | England | MF | 1960-1961 | 19 | 5 | 22 | 5 | |
| David Hodkinson | England | MF | 1961-1962 | 2 | 0 | 2 | 0 | |
| John Horsburgh | Scotland | GK | 1961 | 1 | 0 | 2 | 0 | |
| Ken Ford | England | MF | 1961-1962 | 5 | 1 | 6 | 1 | |
| Alan Shackleton | England | FW | 1961-1962 | 10 | 7 | 12 | 7 | |
| Ian Greaves | England | DF | 1961-1963 | 22 | 0 | 23 | 0 | |
| Stan Ackerley | Australia | DF | 1962 | 2 | 0 | 2 | 0 | |
| Len Dickinson | England | FW | 1962 | 5 | 2 | 5 | 2 | |
| Alan Swinburne | England | GK | 1963-1964 | 4 | 0 | 4 | 0 | |
| Colin Barlow | England | MF | 1963-1964 | 6 | 1 | 6 | 1 | |
| Alan Halsall | Wales | GK | 1964 | 2 | 0 | 2 | 0 | |
| John Burdess | England | FW | 1964-1965 | 3 | 0 | 3 | 0 | |
| Alex Cameron | Scotland | DF | 1964 | 15 | 0 | 16 | 0 | |
| Bobby Craig | Scotland | FW | 1964-1965 | 18 | 4 | 19 | 5 | |
| Phil McCarthy | England | MF | 1965 | 3 | 0 | 3 | 0 | |
| Gerry McGowan | Scotland | MF | 1965-1966 | 5 | 1 | 5 | 1 | |
| Peter Bryan | England | DF | 1965 | 6 | 0 | 8 | 0 | |
| Ray Holt | England | DF | 1965 | 15 | 0 | 17 | 0 | |
| Peter Mitchell | England | DF | 1966 | 1 | 0 | 2 | 0 | |
| Jimmy Hall | England | DF | 1966 | 2 | 0 | 3 | 0 | |
| Jimmy Curran | England | GK | 1966-1967 | 3 | 0 | 4 | 0 | |
| George Kinnell | Scotland | DF | 1966 | 12 | 8 | 12 | 8 | |
| Mike Nolan | Ireland | DF | 1967 | 2 | 0 | 2 | 0 | |
| Noel Quinn | Ireland | MF | 1967 | 4 | 0 | 4 | 0 | |
| Joe Makin | England | DF | 1967 | 6 | 0 | 6 | 0 | |
| Tony Foster | Ireland | MF | 1967 | 9 | 0 | 11 | 1 | |
| Laurie Sheffield | Wales | FW | 1967-1968 | 18 | 7 | 18 | 7 | |
| Billy Aitken | Scotland | MF | 1968 | 1 | 0 | 2 | 0 | |
| Ray Smith | Northern Ireland | MF | 1968 | 2 | 0 | 3 | 0 | |
| Billy Molyneux | England | GK | 1968-1969 | 8 | 0 | 9 | 0 | |
| David Down | England | FW | 1968-1969 | 9 | 1 | 10 | 1 | |
| Mike Faulkner | England | FW | 1969 | 1 | 0 | 1 | 0 | |
| Graham Schofield | England | DF | 1969 | 1 | 0 | 1 | 0 | |
| Alan Taylor | England | GK | 1969 | 2 | 0 | 2 | 0 | |
| John Fitton | England | GK | 1969 | 3 | 0 | 3 | 0 | |
| Steve Hoolickin | England | DF | 1969-1972 | 8 | 0 | 8 | 0 | |
| David Bright | England | DF | 1969 | 19 | 0 | 19 | 0 | |
| John Bingham | England | MF | 1969-1970 | 17 | 3 | 19 | 4 | |
| Brian Woodall | England | MF | 1970 | 4 | 1 | 4 | 1 | |
| Maurice Short | England | GK | 1970 | 5 | 0 | 7 | 0 | |
| Jimmy Mundy | England | MF | 1970 | 8 | 2 | 8 | 2 | |
| Barry Hartle | England | MF | 1970-1971 | 9 | 2 | 10 | 2 | |
| Brian Turner | England | MF | 1970-1971 | 11 | 0 | 11 | 0 | |
| John Sleeuwenhoek | England | DF | 1971 | 2 | 0 | 3 | 0 | |
| Gordon Marsland | England | DF | 1971 | 4 | 0 | 4 | 0 | |
| Ian Buckley | England | DF | 1971-1972, 1974 | 5 | 0 | 6 | 0 | |
| Kevin Crumblehulme | England | MF | 1972 | 2 | 0 | 2 | 0 | |
| Chris Jones | England | FW | 1972 | 3 | 1 | 3 | 1 | |
| Derek Spence | Northern Ireland | FW | 1972 | 6 | 0 | 6 | 0 | |
| Johnny Morrissey | England | MF | 1972 | 6 | 1 | 7 | 1 | |
| Bobby Collins | Scotland | MF | 1972-1973 | 7 | 0 | 9 | 1 | |
| Tony Hateley | England | FW | 1973 | 5 | 1 | 5 | 1 | |
| Ray Treacy | Ireland | FW | 1975 | 3 | 1 | 3 | 1 | |
| Joe Carroll | England | FW | 1975-1976 | 4 | 0 | 4 | 0 | |
| John Dungworth | England | FW | 1975-1976 | 4 | 0 | 4 | 0 | |
| Mike Bernard | England | MF | 1977-1978 | 6 | 0 | 7 | 0 | |
| Ian Green | England | GK | 1978 | 0 | 0 | 2 | 0 | |
| Tim Jordan | England | FW | 1978-1979 | 5 | 0 | 5 | 0 | |
| Martin Nuttall | England | FW | 1981-1982 | 13 | 1 | 15 | 1 | |
| Martin Hodge | England | GK | 1982 | 4 | 0 | 4 | 0 | |
| Neil Firm | England | DF | 1982 | 9 | 0 | 9 | 0 | |
| Dougie Anderson | Hong Kong | MF | 1982-1984 | 9 | 0 | 11 | 0 | |
| John Humphreys | England | FW | 1982-1984 | 13 | 0 | 16 | 0 | |
| Ian McMahon | England | MF | 1983 | 2 | 0 | 2 | 0 | |
| Russell Bromage | England | DF | 1983 | 2 | 0 | 2 | 0 | |
| Peter Taylor | England | MF | 1983 | 4 | 0 | 4 | 0 | |
| Mark Grew | England | GK | 1983 | 5 | 0 | 6 | 0 | |
| Brian Parkin | England | GK | 1983-1984 | 6 | 0 | 8 | 0 | |
| Alex Jones | England | DF | 1983-1985 | 9 | 0 | 10 | 0 | |
| Steve Bullock | England | DF | 1983-1986 | 18 | 0 | 19 | 0 | |
| John Hudson | England | MF | 1983-1984 | 20 | 0 | 22 | 0 | |
| Jimmy Collins | England | DF | 1984 | 1 | 0 | 1 | 0 | |
| Andy Hodkinson | England | MF | 1984 | 5 | 1 | 5 | 1 | |
| Wayne Harrison | England | FW | 1984-1985 | 6 | 1 | 8 | 2 | |
| Jeff Wealands | England | GK | 1984 | 10 | 0 | 10 | 0 | |
| Brendan O'Callaghan | England | FW | 1985 | 10 | 0 | 10 | 0 | |
| Tony Ellis | England | FW | 1986-1987 | 8 | 0 | 10 | 0 | |
| Gordon Smith | Scotland | MF | 1986 | 15 | 0 | 15 | 0 | |
| Aaron Callaghan | Ireland | DF | 1986-1988 | 16 | 2 | 21 | 2 | |
| Steve Morgan | Wales | MF | 1987-1989 | 2 | 0 | 3 | 0 | |
| Neil Edmonds | England | MF | 1987-1988 | 5 | 0 | 7 | 0 | |
| Kevin Moore | England | DF | 1987 | 13 | 1 | 15 | 1 | |
| Glenn Keeley | England | DF | 1987 | 11 | 0 | 15 | 1 | |
| Winston DuBose | United States | GK | 1988 | 0 | 0 | 1 | 0 | |
| Simon Mooney | England | DF | 1988 | 0 | 0 | 1 | 0 | |
| Peter Litchfield | England | GK | 1988 | 3 | 0 | 3 | 0 | |
| Norman Kelly | Northern Ireland | MF | 1988-1989 | 2 | 0 | 4 | 0 | |
| Chris Blundell | England | DF | 1988-1989 | 3 | 0 | 5 | 0 | |
| Tony Philliskirk | England | FW | 1988 | 10 | 1 | 13 | 2 | |
| Steve Bramwell | England | MF | 1989 | 1 | 0 | 1 | 0 | |
| Andy Gayle | England | MF | 1989 | 1 | 0 | 1 | 0 | |
| Asa Hartford | Scotland | MF | 1989 | 7 | 0 | 7 | 0 | |
| Scott McGarvey | Scotland | FW | 1989-1990 | 4 | 1 | 9 | 2 | |
| Andy Holden | Wales | DF | 1989-1994 | 22 | 4 | 24 | 4 | |
| Wayne Heseltine | England | DF | 1990 | 1 | 0 | 2 | 0 | |
| Derek Brazil | Ireland | DF | 1990 | 1 | 0 | 2 | 0 | |
| Mike Fillery | England | MF | 1990-1991 | 2 | 0 | 2 | 0 | |
| John Keeley | England | GK | 1991-1992 | 2 | 0 | 4 | 0 | |
| Glynn Snodin | England | MF | 1991 | 8 | 1 | 9 | 1 | |
| Brian Kilcline | England | DF | 1991 | 8 | 0 | 10 | 0 | |
| Neil Tolson | England | FW | 1992-1993 | 3 | 0 | 3 | 0 | |
| Orpheo Keizerweerd | Netherlands | FW | 1993 | 1 | 0 | 1 | 0 | |
| Lance Key | England | GK | 1993 | 2 | 0 | 2 | 0 | |
| Gary Walsh | England | GK | 1993 | 6 | 0 | 6 | 0 | |
| Tore Pedersen | Norway | DF | 1993-1994 | 10 | 0 | 13 | 0 | |
| Billy Kenny | England | MF | 1994 | 4 | 0 | 4 | 0 | |
| Neil Moore | England | DF | 1995 | 5 | 0 | 5 | 0 | |
| Michel Vonk | Netherlands | DF | 1995 | 5 | 1 | 5 | 1 | |
| Paul Wilkinson | England | FW | 1995 | 4 | 1 | 5 | 2 | |
| Simon Webster | England | DF | 1995 | 7 | 0 | 7 | 0 | |
| Martin Pemberton | England | DF | 1995-1996 | 5 | 0 | 7 | 0 | |
| Darren Lonergan | Ireland | DF | 1996 | 2 | 0 | 2 | 0 | |
| John Morrow | Northern Ireland | MF | 1996 | 2 | 0 | 2 | 0 | |
| John Gannon | England | MF | 1996-1997 | 6 | 0 | 6 | 0 | |
| Gerry Creaney | Scotland | FW | 1996 | 9 | 2 | 9 | 2 | |
| Mark Foran | England | DF | 1997 | 1 | 0 | 1 | 0 | |
| Ian Ironside | England | GK | 1997 | 0 | 0 | 1 | 0 | |
| Alex Kyratzoglou | Australia | FW | 1997 | 1 | 0 | 1 | 0 | |
| Lloyd Richardson | England | MF | 1997 | 1 | 0 | 2 | 0 | |
| Neil Thompson | England | DF | 1997-1998 | 8 | 0 | 8 | 0 | |
| Mike Pollitt | England | GK | 1997 | 16 | 0 | 16 | 0 | |
| Danny Boxall | England | DF | 1997-1998 | 18 | 0 | 19 | 0 | |
| Nick Spooner | England | DF | 1998 | 2 | 0 | 2 | 0 | |
| Bruce Grobbelaar | Zimbabwe | GK | 1998 | 4 | 0 | 4 | 0 | |
| Lee Clitheroe | England | MF | 1998 | 5 | 0 | 5 | 0 | |
| Ian McLean | England | DF | 1998-1999 | 6 | 0 | 6 | 0 | |
| Ronnie Jepson | England | FW | 1998 | 9 | 4 | 9 | 4 | |
| Phil Starbuck | England | FW | 1998 | 9 | 1 | 9 | 1 | |
| Adrian Littlejohn | England | FW | 1998 | 21 | 5 | 23 | 6 | |
| Danny Walsh | England | MF | 1999 | 2 | 0 | 2 | 0 | |
| Junior Agogo | Ghana | FW | 1999 | 2 | 0 | 2 | 0 | |
| Jordan Tait | England | DF | 1999 | 1 | 0 | 2 | 0 | |
| Iain Swan | Scotland | DF | 1999 | 1 | 0 | 3 | 0 | |
| Andy Gray | England | FW | 1999 | 4 | 0 | 4 | 0 | |
| John McGinlay | Scotland | FW | 1999 | 7 | 1 | 10 | 2 | |
| Ben Futcher | England | DF | 1999-2001 | 10 | 0 | 11 | 0 | |
| Paul Mardon | Wales | DF | 1999 | 12 | 3 | 12 | 3 | |
| Paul Beavers | England | FW | 1999-2000 | 11 | 2 | 13 | 2 | |
| Mark Watson | Canada | DF | 2000 | 2 | 0 | 3 | 0 | |
| Chris Lightfoot | England | DF | 2000 | 3 | 0 | 4 | 0 | |
| Paul Smith | England | MF | 2000 | 4 | 0 | 5 | 0 | |
| Neville Roach | England | FW | 2001 | 1 | 0 | 1 | 0 | |
| Lee Hardy | England | MF | 2001 | 1 | 0 | 1 | 0 | |
| Marc Richards | England | FW | 2001 | 5 | 0 | 6 | 1 | |
| Sam Parkin | England | FW | 2001 | 7 | 3 | 7 | 3 | |
| David Reeves | England | FW | 2001-2002 | 13 | 3 | 13 | 3 | |
| Allan Smart | Scotland | FW | 2001-2002 | 21 | 6 | 24 | 7 | |
| Wayne Gill | England | MF | 2002 | 3 | 0 | 3 | 0 | |
| Dele Adebola | Nigeria | FW | 2002 | 5 | 0 | 5 | 0 | |
| Luís Lourenço | Angola | FW | 2002 | 7 | 1 | 10 | 1 | |
| Christian Colusso | Argentina | MF | 2002 | 13 | 2 | 13 | 2 | |
| Dave Carney | Australia | MF | 2003 | 0 | 0 | 1 | 0 | |
| Rob Walker | England | DF | 2003 | 1 | 0 | 1 | 0 | |
| Ndiwa Lord-Kangana | DR Congo | DF | 2003 | 4 | 0 | 4 | 0 | |
| Ben Burgess | Ireland | FW | 2003 | 7 | 0 | 7 | 0 | |
| Mickael Antoine-Curier | France | FW | 2003 | 8 | 2 | 9 | 3 | |
| Carlos Roca | England | MF | 2003 | 7 | 0 | 11 | 0 | |
| Mark Hudson | England | DF | 2003 | 15 | 0 | 16 | 0 | |
| Matt O'Halloran | England | MF | 2003 | 13 | 1 | 17 | 1 | |
| Craig Fleming | England | FW | 2004 | 1 | 0 | 1 | 0 | |
| Rob Lee | England | MF | 2004 | 0 | 0 | 1 | 0 | |
| Ashley Winn | England | MF | 2004 | 2 | 0 | 2 | 0 | |
| Dean Crowe | England | FW | 2004 | 5 | 1 | 5 | 1 | |
| Craig Mawson | England | GK | 2004 | 4 | 0 | 5 | 0 | |
| Aaron Wilbraham | England | FW | 2004 | 4 | 2 | 5 | 2 | |
| Wes Wilkinson | England | FW | 2004-2005 | 6 | 0 | 7 | 0 | |
| David Lee | England | MF | 2004 | 7 | 0 | 9 | 0 | |
| Rodney Jack | Saint Vincent and the Grenadines | FW | 2004 | 10 | 2 | 11 | 2 | |
| Matty Barlow | England | FW | 2004-2006 | 10 | 0 | 13 | 0 | |
| Alex Bruce | England | DF | 2004-2005 | 12 | 0 | 16 | 0 | |
| Mark Arber | England | DF | 2004 | 14 | 1 | 17 | 1 | |
| Amadou Sanokho | France | MF | 2005 | 1 | 0 | 1 | 0 | |
| Lance Cronin | England | GK | 2005 | 0 | 0 | 1 | 0 | |
| Steve Mildenhall | England | GK | 2005 | 6 | 0 | 6 | 0 | |
| Kenny Cooper | United States | FW | 2005 | 7 | 3 | 9 | 3 | |
| Delroy Facey | Grenada | FW | 2005 | 9 | 0 | 10 | 0 | |
| Adam Legzdins | England | GK | 2006 | 0 | 0 | 1 | 0 | |
| Anthony Grant | Jamaica | MF | 2006 | 2 | 0 | 2 | 0 | |
| David Knight | England | GK | 2006 | 2 | 0 | 2 | 0 | |
| Terry Smith | England | GK | 2006 | 1 | 0 | 2 | 0 | |
| Chris Howarth | England | GK | 2006 | 3 | 0 | 4 | 0 | |
| Tomasz Cywka | Poland | FW | 2006 | 3 | 0 | 5 | 0 | |
| Maheta Molango | Switzerland | FW | 2006 | 5 | 1 | 6 | 1 | |
| Neil Wood | England | FW | 2006 | 5 | 0 | 7 | 0 | |
| Lewis Grabban | Jamaica | FW | 2006 | 9 | 0 | 10 | 0 | |
| Lee Grant | England | GK | 2006 | 16 | 0 | 16 | 0 | |
| Chris Swailes | England | DF | 2006 | 19 | 0 | 19 | 0 | |
| Hasney Aljofree | England | DF | 2007, 2010 | 6 | 0 | 6 | 0 | |
| Ben Turner | England | DF | 2007 | 1 | 0 | 1 | 0 | |
| Mike Pearson | Wales | DF | 2007 | 2 | 0 | 2 | 0 | |
| Stuart Giddings | England | DF | 2007 | 2 | 0 | 3 | 0 | |
| Miki Roqué | Spain | DF | 2007 | 4 | 0 | 4 | 0 | |
| Alan Blayney | Northern Ireland | GK | 2007 | 3 | 0 | 5 | 0 | |
| Leon Clarke | England | FW | 2007 | 5 | 3 | 5 | 3 | |
| Marlon Beresford | England | GK | 2007 | 5 | 0 | 6 | 0 | |
| Luigi Glombard | France | FW | 2007 | 8 | 1 | 10 | 1 | |
| Michael Ricketts | England | FW | 2007 | 9 | 2 | 12 | 2 | |
| John Thompson | Ireland | DF | 2007-2008 | 7 | 0 | 12 | 0 | |
| Ryan Bertrand | England | DF | 2007-2008 | 21 | 0 | 24 | 0 | |
| Ashley Kelly | England | MF | 2008 | 1 | 0 | 1 | 0 | |
| Aaron Chalmers | England | MF | 2008 | 2 | 0 | 2 | 0 | |
| Jordan Robertson | England | FW | 2008 | 3 | 1 | 3 | 1 | |
| Richard O'Donnell | England | GK | 2008 | 4 | 0 | 4 | 0 | |
| Richie Byrne | Ireland | DF | 2008 | 4 | 0 | 4 | 0 | |
| Brett Ormerod | England | FW | 2008 | 5 | 0 | 5 | 0 | |
| Leon Constantine | England | FW | 2008 | 8 | 2 | 8 | 2 | |
| David Livermore | England | MF | 2008 | 10 | 1 | 10 | 1 | |
| Darren Byfield | Jamaica | FW | 2008-2009 | 11 | 1 | 12 | 1 | |
| Greg Fleming | Scotland | GK | 2008-2009 | 18 | 0 | 20 | 0 | |
| Alan Sheehan | Ireland | DF | 2009, 2021 | 14 | 1 | 15 | 1 | |
| Fábio Ferreira | Portugal | FW | 2009 | 1 | 0 | 1 | 0 | |
| Chris Rowney | England | MF | 2009 | 1 | 0 | 2 | 0 | |
| Jan Budtz | Denmark | GK | 2009 | 3 | 0 | 3 | 0 | |
| Seb Hines | England | DF | 2009 | 4 | 0 | 4 | 0 | |
| Paul Heffernan | Ireland | FW | 2009 | 4 | 1 | 4 | 1 | |
| Lee Hills | England | DF | 2009 | 3 | 0 | 4 | 0 | |
| Shane Supple | Ireland | GK | 2009 | 5 | 0 | 5 | 0 | |
| Ian Westlake | England | MF | 2009 | 5 | 0 | 5 | 0 | |
| Djeny Bembo-Leta | DR Congo | FW | 2009-2010 | 3 | 0 | 6 | 1 | |
| Peter Gilbert | Wales | DF | 2009 | 5 | 0 | 6 | 0 | |
| Scott Golbourne | England | DF | 2009 | 8 | 0 | 8 | 0 | |
| Steve Kabba | England | FW | 2009 | 8 | 0 | 8 | 0 | |
| Dean Windass | England | FW | 2009 | 11 | 1 | 11 | 1 | |
| Nick Blackman | Barbados | FW | 2009-2010 | 12 | 1 | 13 | 1 | |
| Andy Holdsworth | England | MF | 2009 | 12 | 0 | 15 | 0 | |
| Joe Jacobson | Wales | DF | 2009-2010 | 15 | 0 | 15 | 0 | |
| Jon Worthington | England | MF | 2009-2010 | 16 | 0 | 17 | 0 | |
| Darryl Flahavan | England | GK | 2009-2010 | 18 | 0 | 19 | 0 | |
| Jean-François Christophe | France | MF | 2010 | 1 | 0 | 1 | 0 | |
| Andy Crompton | England | FW | 2010 | 0 | 0 | 1 | 0 | |
| Rod McDonald | England | DF | 2010 | 0 | 0 | 1 | 0 | |
| Danny Nardiello | Wales | FW | 2010 | 2 | 0 | 2 | 0 | |
| Krisztian Timar | Hungary | DF | 2010 | 2 | 0 | 2 | 0 | |
| Paul Dickov | Scotland | FW | 2010-2011 | 2 | 0 | 2 | 0 | |
| Rodrigue Dikaba | DR Congo | DF | 2010 | 1 | 0 | 3 | 0 | |
| Jason Price | Wales | MF | 2010 | 7 | 1 | 7 | 1 | |
| Jim Goodwin | Ireland | MF | 2010 | 8 | 0 | 8 | 0 | |
| Lewis Guy | England | FW | 2010 | 12 | 3 | 12 | 3 | |
| Tom Eaves | England | FW | 2010 | 15 | 0 | 15 | 0 | |
| Dean Kelly | Ireland | FW | 2010 | 13 | 1 | 15 | 1 | |
| Warren Feeney | Northern Ireland | FW | 2010-2011 | 23 | 0 | 24 | 1 | |
| Aidy White | Ireland | DF | 2010-2011 | 24 | 4 | 24 | 4 | |
| Ryan Burns | Northern Ireland | MF | 2011 | 1 | 0 | 1 | 0 | |
| Phillip McGrath | Northern Ireland | MF | 2011 | 1 | 0 | 1 | 0 | |
| Andrea Mancini | Italy | FW | 2011 | 1 | 0 | 2 | 0 | |
| Matty Lund | Northern Ireland | MF | 2011 | 3 | 0 | 3 | 0 | |
| Sam Mantom | England | MF | 2011 | 4 | 0 | 4 | 0 | |
| Andy Todd | England | DF | 2011 | 6 | 0 | 6 | 0 | |
| Jason Lowe | England | MF | 2011 | 7 | 2 | 8 | 2 | |
| Ben Amos | England | GK | 2011 | 16 | 0 | 16 | 0 | |
| Bradley Diallo | France | DF | 2011-2012 | 15 | 0 | 16 | 0 | |
| Luca Scapuzzi | Italy | FW | 2011-2012 | 10 | 1 | 17 | 2 | |
| Josh Parker | Antigua and Barbuda | FW | 2011-2012 | 13 | 0 | 18 | 0 | |
| Nathan Clarke | England | DF | 2011-2012 | 16 | 1 | 20 | 1 | |
| Liam Jacob | Australia | GK | 2012 | 1 | 0 | 1 | 0 | |
| Jordan Slew | England | FW | 2012 | 3 | 0 | 4 | 1 | |
| Glenn Belezika | England | DF | 2012-2013 | 4 | 0 | 5 | 0 | |
| Connor Hughes | England | MF | 2012-2013 | 8 | 0 | 10 | 0 | |
| Dan Taylor | England | FW | 2012-2013 | 8 | 1 | 10 | 1 | |
| Harry Bunn | England | FW | 2012 | 11 | 0 | 11 | 0 | |
| Chris Sutherland | England | MF | 2012-2013 | 10 | 0 | 11 | 0 | |
| Keanu Marsh-Brown | Guyana | MF | 2012 | 11 | 1 | 12 | 1 | |
| Reece Brown | England | DF | 2012 | 15 | 0 | 15 | 0 | |
| Matt Derbyshire | England | FW | 2012 | 18 | 4 | 20 | 6 | |
| Joe Cooper | England | MF | 2013 | 1 | 0 | 1 | 0 | |
| Jack Truelove | England | DF | 2013 | 1 | 0 | 1 | 0 | |
| John Pritchard | England | FW | 2013 | 1 | 0 | 1 | 0 | |
| Danny Gosset | Wales | FW | 2013 | 2 | 0 | 2 | 0 | |
| Terry Dunfield | Canada | MF | 2013 | 2 | 0 | 2 | 0 | |
| Albert Rusnák | Slovakia | MF | 2013 | 2 | 0 | 3 | 0 | |
| Ellis Plummer | England | DF | 2013 | 3 | 0 | 4 | 0 | |
| Bobby Reid | Jamaica | MF | 2013 | 7 | 0 | 7 | 0 | |
| Jordan Bove | England | FW | 2013-2015 | 5 | 0 | 7 | 1 | |
| Chris Iwelumo | Scotland | FW | 2013 | 7 | 1 | 9 | 1 | |
| Jordan Obita | England | DF | 2013 | 8 | 0 | 10 | 1 | |
| Anton Rodgers | Ireland | MF | 2013-2014 | 7 | 0 | 14 | 0 | |
| Matt Lanzoni | Italy | DF | 2013 | 10 | 1 | 15 | 2 | |
| Mike Petrasso | Canada | MF | 2013-2014 | 11 | 1 | 15 | 1 | |
| Lee Barnard | England | FW | 2013 | 14 | 3 | 16 | 3 | |
| Sidney Schmeltz | Netherlands | MF | 2013-2014 | 17 | 0 | 23 | 1 | |
| Adel Gafaiti | Algeria | DF | 2014 | 1 | 0 | 1 | 0 | |
| Neil Etheridge | Philippines | GK | 2014 | 0 | 0 | 1 | 0 | |
| Willie Gros | Madagascar | FW | 2014 | 1 | 0 | 2 | 0 | |
| David Noble | Scotland | MF | 2014 | 2 | 0 | 2 | 0 | |
| Joel Byrom | England | MF | 2014 | 4 | 0 | 4 | 0 | |
| John Paul Kissock | England | MF | 2014 | 4 | 0 | 4 | 0 | |
| Paddy Kenny | Ireland | GK | 2014 | 3 | 0 | 4 | 0 | |
| Daniel Johnson | Jamaica | MF | 2014 | 6 | 3 | 7 | 3 | |
| Michael Tidser | Scotland | MF | 2014 | 5 | 0 | 7 | 0 | |
| Jabo Ibehre | England | FW | 2014-2015 | 11 | 2 | 12 | 2 | |
| Amari Morgan-Smith | England | FW | 2014-2015 | 13 | 2 | 15 | 2 | |
| David Worrall | England | MF | 2014 | 18 | 1 | 18 | 1 | |
| Conor Wilkinson | Ireland | FW | 2014-2015 | 17 | 3 | 18 | 3 | |
| Gary Harkins | Scotland | MF | 2014 | 23 | 5 | 24 | 5 | |
| Gavin Gunning | Ireland | DF | 2015 | 0 | 0 | 1 | 0 | |
| Devante Jacobs | England | FW | 2015 | 2 | 0 | 2 | 0 | |
| Eoghan O'Connell | Ireland | DF | 2015 | 2 | 0 | 2 | 0 | |
| Jack Tuohoy | England | MF | 2015 | 2 | 0 | 3 | 0 | |
| Richie Wellens | England | MF | 2015-2016 | 3 | 0 | 3 | 0 | |
| George Green | England | MF | 2015 | 3 | 0 | 4 | 0 | |
| Simonas Stankevičius | Lithuania | FW | 2015 | 4 | 0 | 4 | 0 | |
| Richard Eckersley | England | DF | 2015 | 4 | 0 | 6 | 0 | |
| Giorgio Rasulo | England | MF | 2015 | 3 | 0 | 6 | 0 | |
| Jacob Mellis | England | MF | 2015 | 7 | 0 | 7 | 0 | |
| Ricardo Fuller | Jamaica | FW | 2015-2016 | 5 | 0 | 7 | 0 | |
| Mat Sadler | England | DF | 2015 | 8 | 0 | 8 | 0 | |
| Luke Woodland | Philippines | MF | 2015-2016 | 7 | 0 | 8 | 0 | |
| David Dunn | England | MF | 2015 | 8 | 0 | 9 | 0 | |
| Jake Kean | England | GK | 2015 | 11 | 0 | 11 | 0 | |
| Jay Fulton | Scotland | MF | 2015 | 11 | 0 | 11 | 0 | |
| Jonny Burn | England | DF | 2015 | 12 | 1 | 12 | 1 | |
| Michael Higdon | England | FW | 2015 | 11 | 4 | 13 | 4 | |
| Daniel Lafferty | Northern Ireland | DF | 2015-2016 | 15 | 1 | 15 | 1 | |
| David Cornell | Wales | GK | 2015-2016 | 14 | 0 | 17 | 0 | |
| Mark Yeates | Ireland | MF | 2015 | 16 | 1 | 19 | 2 | |
| Chris Kettings | Scotland | GK | 2016 | 0 | 0 | 1 | 0 | |
| Kallum Mantack | England | DF | 2016-2017 | 1 | 0 | 3 | 0 | |
| Timmy Thiele | Germany | FW | 2016 | 4 | 0 | 4 | 0 | |
| Calaum Jahraldo-Martin | Antigua and Barbuda | FW | 2016 | 4 | 0 | 5 | 0 | |
| Tareiq Holmes-Dennis | England | DF | 2016 | 10 | 0 | 10 | 0 | |
| Marc Klok | Indonesia | MF | 2016 | 10 | 0 | 12 | 0 | |
| Matt Palmer | England | MF | 2016 | 14 | 1 | 14 | 1 | |
| Jamie Reckford | England | DF | 2016-2017 | 13 | 0 | 16 | 0 | |
| Curtis Main | England | FW | 2016 | 18 | 4 | 18 | 4 | |
| Charles Dunne | Ireland | DF | 2016 | 14 | 0 | 19 | 0 | |
| Freddie Ladapo | England | FW | 2016-2017 | 17 | 2 | 24 | 3 | |
| Brendy Glackin | Northern Ireland | FW | 2017 | 1 | 0 | 1 | 0 | |
| Gyamfi Kyeremeh | Belgium | MF | 2017 | 1 | 0 | 1 | 0 | |
| Jack Ruddy | Scotland | GK | 2017 | 5 | 0 | 5 | 0 | |
| Mason Fawns | England | FW | 2017 | 4 | 0 | 6 | 0 | |
| Ben Wilson | England | GK | 2017 | 5 | 0 | 7 | 0 | |
| Courtney Duffus | Ireland | FW | 2017-2018 | 6 | 0 | 9 | 0 | |
| Abdelhakim Omrani | Algeria | MF | 2017-2018 | 8 | 0 | 12 | 0 | |
| Michael Ngoo | England | FW | 2017 | 13 | 0 | 13 | 0 | |
| Aiden O'Neill | Australia | MF | 2017 | 15 | 0 | 15 | 0 | |
| Queensy Menig | Netherlands | MF | 2017-2018 | 14 | 1 | 16 | 1 | |
| Jamie Stott | England | DF | 2017-2019 | 16 | 0 | 21 | 1 | |
| Alex Palmer | England | GK | 2018 | 1 | 0 | 1 | 0 | |
| Kundai Benyu | Zimbabwe | MF | 2018 | 4 | 0 | 5 | 0 | |
| Giles Coke | England | MF | 2018-2019 | 4 | 0 | 5 | 0 | |
| Patrick McEleney | Ireland | MF | 2018 | 9 | 1 | 9 | 1 | |
| Sam Graham | England | DF | 2018 | 7 | 0 | 9 | 0 | |
| Wilfried Moimbé | France | DF | 2018 | 11 | 0 | 11 | 0 | |
| Jonathan Benteke | Belgium | FW | 2018-2019 | 10 | 1 | 13 | 2 | |
| Jordan Lyden | Australia | DF | 2018-2019 | 10 | 1 | 14 | 1 | |
| Ben Pringle | England | MF | 2018 | 13 | 1 | 15 | 1 | |
| Duckens Nazon | Haiti | FW | 2018 | 16 | 6 | 16 | 6 | |
| Ishmael Miller | England | FW | 2018 | 16 | 3 | 18 | 4 | |
| Andy Taylor | England | DF | 2018 | 15 | 0 | 19 | 0 | |
| Sam Surridge | England | FW | 2018-2019 | 15 | 8 | 20 | 12 | |
| Harry Robinson | Northern Ireland | MF | 2019 | 1 | 0 | 1 | 0 | |
| Javid Swaby-Neavin | England | DF | 2019 | 1 | 0 | 1 | 0 | |
| Chinedu Uche | Nigeria | MF | 2019 | 1 | 0 | 1 | 0 | |
| Callum Dolan | England | MF | 2019 | 0 | 0 | 1 | 0 | |
| Reece Gaskell | England | MF | 2019 | 1 | 0 | 1 | 0 | |
| Florian Gonzales | France | MF | 2019 | 0 | 0 | 1 | 0 | |
| Marvin Kokos | France | FW | 2019 | 0 | 0 | 1 | 0 | |
| Dominic McHale | England | MF | 2019 | 1 | 0 | 1 | 0 | |
| Lewis McKinney | England | FW | 2019 | 2 | 0 | 2 | 0 | |
| Gregor Zabret | Slovenia | GK | 2019 | 0 | 0 | 2 | 0 | |
| Kielen Adams | England | FW | 2019 | 1 | 0 | 3 | 0 | |
| Zak Emmerson | England | FW | 2019 | 2 | 0 | 3 | 0 | |
| Jean-Louis Akpa Akpro | France | FW | 2019-2020 | 3 | 0 | 4 | 0 | |
| Sonhy Sefil | Martinique | DF | 2019 | 4 | 0 | 5 | 0 | |
| David Jones | England | MF | 2019-2020 | 6 | 0 | 6 | 0 | |
| Tomáš Egert | Czech Republic | DF | 2019 | 6 | 0 | 8 | 0 | |
| Ashley Smith-Brown | England | DF | 2019 | 6 | 0 | 9 | 0 | |
| Dapo Afolayan | England | FW | 2019 | 10 | 0 | 10 | 0 | |
| Urko Vera | Spain | FW | 2019 | 10 | 2 | 12 | 2 | |
| Gary Woods | England | GK | 2019-2020 | 15 | 0 | 16 | 0 | |
| Chris Eagles | England | MF | 2019-2020 | 15 | 0 | 18 | 0 | |
| Chris McCann | Ireland | MF | 2019-2020 | 16 | 0 | 19 | 0 | |
| MacKenzie Chapman | England | GK | 2020 | 1 | 0 | 1 | 0 | |
| Ben Hough | England | MF | 2020 | 1 | 0 | 1 | 0 | |
| Laurence Bilboe | England | GK | 2020-2021 | 3 | 0 | 3 | 0 | |
| Mani Dieseruvwe | England | FW | 2020 | 4 | 0 | 4 | 0 | |
| Christian N'Guessan | England | MF | 2020 | 8 | 0 | 8 | 0 | |
| Vani Da Silva | England | FW | 2020-2021 | 3 | 0 | 8 | 0 | |
| George Blackwood | Australia | FW | 2020-2021 | 13 | 3 | 15 | 3 | |
| Andrea Badan | Italy | DF | 2020-2021 | 18 | 0 | 20 | 0 | |
| Jordan Barnett | England | DF | 2020-2021 | 17 | 0 | 24 | 0 | |
| Jamie Hopcutt | England | FW | 2021-2022 | 16 | 1 | 19 | 1 | |
| Isaac Modi | England | MF | 2021-2022 | 2 | 0 | 2 | 0 | |
| Danny Rogers | Ireland | GK | 2021-2022 | 22 | 0 | 24 | 0 | |
| Jacob Blyth | England | FW | 2021 | 3 | 0 | 4 | 0 | |
| Ousseynou Cissé | Mali | MF | 2021-2022 | 8 | 0 | 11 | 0 | |
| Marcus Barnes | England | FW | 2021 | 7 | 0 | 7 | 0 | |
| Serhat Tasdemir | Azerbaijan | MF | 2021 | 7 | 0 | 7 | 0 | |
| Faysal Bettache | England | MF | 2021-2022 | 10 | 0 | 13 | 0 | |
| Laurie Walker | England | GK | 2021 | 15 | 0 | 16 | 0 | |
| Marcel Hilßner | Germany | MF | 2021 | 20 | 1 | 20 | 1 | |
| Alex Hunt | England | MF | 2022 | 13 | 0 | 13 | 0 | |
| Trey Turner | England | MF | 2022 | 0 | 0 | 1 | 0 | |
| Zaine Francis-Angol | Antigua and Barbuda' | DF | 2022 | 7 | 0 | 7 | 0 | |
| Lois Maynard | St. Kitts and Nevis | MF | 2022-2023 | 9 | 0 | 10 | 0 | |
| Luke Burgess | England | MF | 2022-2023 | 11 | 1 | 11 | 1 | |
| Mitchell Roberts | England | DF | 2022 | 9 | 0 | 9 | 0 | |
| Charlie Cooper | England | MF | 2022 | 15 | 0 | 16 | 0 | |
| Oscar Threlkeld | England | MF | 2022 | 8 | 1 | 8 | 1 | |
| Jordan Windass | England | DF | 2022 | 1 | 0 | 1 | 0 | |
| Charlie Wellens | England | DF | 2022 | 6 | 1 | 6 | 1 | |
| David Okagbue | Ireland | DF | 2022 | 9 | 1 | 10 | 1 | |
| Conor Carty | Ireland | FW | 2022 | 3 | 0 | 4 | 0 | |
| Timmy Abraham | England | FW | 2022-2023 | 15 | 2 | 16 | 2 | |
| James Carragher | England | DF | 2022 | 5 | 0 | 5 | 0 | |
| Ellis Chapman | England | MF | 2022-2023 | 24 | 3 | 24 | 3 | |
| Joe McGlynn | England | FW | 2022 | 2 | 0 | 2 | 0 | |
| Sydie Peck | England | MF | 2022 | 9 | 0 | 9 | 0 | |
| Josef Yarney | England | DF | 2023 | 22 | 2 | 22 | 2 | |
| Kurt Willoughby | England | FW | 2023-2024 | 14 | 0 | 15 | 1 | |
| Dan Ward | England | MF | 2023-2024 | 7 | 0 | 7 | 0 | |
| Brennan Dickenson | England | MF | 2023 | 15 | 5 | 16 | 5 | |
| Kieron Freeman | Wales | DF | 2023 | 9 | 0 | 10 | 0 | |
| Josh Stones | England | FW | 2023-2025 | 10 | 8 | 12 | 6 | |
| Kofi Moore | Ireland | MF | 2023-2025 | 1 | 0 | 5 | 0 | |
| Ethan Walker | England | FW | 2024 | 3 | 0 | 3 | 0 | |
| Andy Dallas | Scotland | FW | 2024 | 14 | 0 | 14 | 0 | |
| Sai Sachdev | England | DF | 2024 | 6 | 0 | 6 | 0 | |
| Sam Clucas | England | MF | 2024-2025 | 7 | 0 | 9 | 0 | |
| Harry Charsley | England | MF | 2024-2026 | 11 | 0 | 15 | 1 | |
| Jack Stretton | England | FW | 2024 | 1 | 0 | 2 | 0 | |
| Callum Dolan | England | MF | 2024 | 6 | 0 | 6 | 0 | |
| Mo Doro | England | DF | 2024 | 0 | 0 | 2 | 0 | |
| Jordon Garrick | Jamaica | MF | 2024 | 0 | 0 | 1 | 0 | |
| Otis Khan | Pakistan | MF | 2024-2025 | 7 | 1 | 14 | 1 | |
| Scott Moloney | England | GK | 2024-2025 | 0 | 0 | 4 | 0 | |
| AJ Amadin | England | DF | 2024 | 0 | 0 | 1 | 0 | |
| Ruben Ndienguila | England | DF | 2024 | 0 | 0 | 1 | 0 | |
| Dylan Teixeira | England | MF | 2024 | 0 | 0 | 1 | 1 | |
| Abubakar Muhammed | England | FW | 2024 | 0 | 0 | 4 | 0 | |
| Victor Dielunvuidi | England | DF | 2024 | 0 | 0 | 3 | 0 | |
| Theo Andrew | England | FW | 2024 | 0 | 0 | 1 | 0 | |
| Jake Dennis | Wales | GK | 2025 | 1 | 0 | 2 | 0 | |
| Jordan Rossiter | England | MF | 2025 | 21 | 0 | 24 | 0 | |
| Billy Waters | England | FW | 2025-2026 | 13 | 2 | 14 | 2 | |
| Matt Worthington | England | MF | 2025 | 9 | 0 | 10 | 0 | |
| Corry Evans | Northern Ireland | MF | 2025 | 6 | 0 | 9 | 0 | |
| Kian Harratt | England | FW | 2025-2026 | 17 | 3 | 21 | 4 | |
| Vimal Yoganathan | Wales | MF | 2025 | 14 | 1 | 17 | 2 | |
| Joe Pritchard | England | MF | 2025 | 14 | 3 | 17 | 4 | |
| Tom Donaghy | England | GK | 2025- | 11 | 0 | 15 | 0 | As of end of 2025-26 season |
| Sam Taylor | England | FW | 2025 | 1 | 0 | 2 | 0 | |
| Jack Stevens | Wales | MF | 2025- | 19 | 6 | 22 | 6 | As of end of 2025-26 season |
| Joe Quigley | Ireland | FW | 2025-2026 | 19 | 3 | 23 | 3 | |
| Charlie Olson | England | DF | 2025-2026 | 0 | 0 | 3 | 0 | |
| Michael Mellon | Scotland | FW | 2025-2026 | 16 | 7 | 18 | 10 | |
| Oliver Howard | England | FW | 2025- | 0 | 0 | 1 | 0 | As of end of 2025-26 season |
| Frankie McMahon-Brown | Ireland | MF | 2025- | 1 | 0 | 1 | 0 | As of end of 2025-26 season |
| Kieron Morris | England | MF | 2025-2026 | 7 | 0 | 10 | 1 | |
| Dynel Simeu | England | DF | 2025-2026 | 11 | 2 | 13 | 2 | |
| Calum Kavanagh | Ireland | FW | 2026- | 10 | 2 | 10 | 2 | As of end of 2025-26 season |
| Kane Taylor | England | MF | 2026 | 16 | 2 | 16 | 2 | |
| Fábio Jaló | Portugal | FW | 2026 | 2 | 0 | 2 | 0 | |
| Isaac Anderson | England | DF | 2026- | 1 | 0 | 1 | 0 | As of end of 2025-26 season |
