= Cornelius White =

Cornelius White may refer to:

- Cornelius White (American football)
- Cornelius White (footballer)
- Cornelius C. White, American politician
