= Frank Herbert (disambiguation) =

Frank Herbert may refer to:

- Frank Herbert (footballer) (1916-1972), English footballer, see List of Oldham Athletic A.F.C. players (1–24 appearances)
- Frank Herbert (1920-1986), American science-fiction author
- Frank Herbert (politician) (1931-2018), American politician
