= Leslie Melville (disambiguation) =

Leslie Melville may refer to:

- Leslie Melville (1902-2002), Australian economist
- Les Melville (1930-2009), English footballer, see List of Oldham Athletic A.F.C. players (1–24 appearances)

== See also ==
- Alexander Leslie-Melville, 14th Earl of Leven (1924-2012), Scottish peer and soldier
