= Frank McCormack =

Frank McCormack may refer to:

- Frank McCormack (cyclist) (born 1969), American cyclist
- Frank McCormack (footballer) (1924–2011), English footballer

== See also ==
- Frank MacCormack (born 1954), American baseball pitcher
- Frank McCormick (1911–1982), American baseball first baseman
- Frank McCormick (American football) (1894–1976), first South Dakotan to play professional football
