= Jack Hardy =

Jack Hardy may refer to:

- Jack Hardy (labor leader) (1901–1993), American labor leader, teacher, and author
- Jack Hardy (politician) (1924–2006), Manitoba politician
- Jack Hardy (singer-songwriter) (1947–2011), American folk musician
- Jack Hardy (catcher) (1877–1921), catcher in Major League Baseball
- Jack Hardy (pitcher) (born 1959), pitcher in Major League Baseball
- Jack Hardy (footballer) (1927–1998), Australian rules footballer
- Jack Hardy (rugby union) (born 1999), Australian rugby player

== See also ==
- John Hardy (disambiguation)
