= St Matthew's Academy =

Coordinates: 55.6414°N 4.7895°W

Saint Matthew's Academy

Location
- Jack's Road, Saltcoats, North Ayrshire, KA21 5NT; Saltcoats, North Ayrshire; Scotland

Information
- Motto: Lux Mundi
- Established: 2007
- Head teacher: Stephen Colligan
- Chaplain: Father Stephen Latham
- Teaching staff: 100
- Enrollment: 1323 approx.
- Colours: Black, Gold & Sky Blue
- Website: saintmatthewsacademy.com

St. Matthew's Academy is a Roman Catholic secondary school in the Scottish town of Saltcoats, North Ayrshire.

The teaching facilities in St Matthew's Academy include sports facilities (including a full-size synthetic pitch, an athletics track and a fitness suite), a 400-seat theatre/auditorium and a central social area for pupils.

== History ==
The school first opened on 29 October 2007 following the merger of pupils from St Andrews Academy, Saltcoats and St Michael's Academy, Kilwinning. As of September 2025 the school roll is 1323 thus making it the second largest school in North Ayrshire The catchment area of the school encompasses all of North Ayrshire. The most recent inspection from Education Scotland has rated the school as "very good" for Learning, Teaching and Assessment and for Raising Attainment and Achievement. In 2025 Saint Matthew's Academy was the joint highest performing school in North Ayrshire and the 55th highest performing school in Scotland.

== Associated primaries ==
The roll of St Matthew's Academy is drawn in the main from the ten cluster denominational primary schools located throughout North Ayrshire: St John Ogilvie's and St Mark's in Irvine; St Winning's and St Luke's in Kilwinning; St John's in Stevenston; St Anthony's in Saltcoats; St Peter's in Ardrossan; St Mary's in Largs; St Bridget's in Kilbirnie; and St Palladius' in Dalry. Pupils from all areas other than Ardrossan, Saltcoats and Stevenston travel to St Matthew's Academy by contract bus.
