= John Hardy =

John Hardy may refer to:

- "John Hardy" (song) (first recorded 1924), an American folk song about a murderer, hanged in 1896
- John Hardy (aviator) (born 1942), Australian aviator and Administrator of the Northern Territory
- John Hardy (composer) (born 1957), British composer, active since 1994
- John Hardy (geneticist) (born 1954), British human geneticist and molecular biologist
- John Hardy (jewelry), jewelry company, founded in 1975
- John Hardy (fl. 1395–1406), MP for Wilton
- John Hardy (MP for Bradford) (1773–1855), British MP and businessman and father of first Earl of Cranbrook
- John Hardy (New York politician) (1835–1913), U.S. representative from New York
- Sir John Hardy, 1st Baronet (1809–1888), British Conservative member of parliament
- John Crumpton Hardy (1864–1938), president of the Mississippi Agricultural and Mechanical College
- John Richard Hardy (1807–1858), Australian gold commissioner
- John Stockdale Hardy (1793–1849), English attorney
- John Spencer Hardy (1913–2012), American lieutenant general during World War II
- Jack Hardy (singer-songwriter) (John Studebaker Hardy, 1947–2011), American lyrical singer-songwriter and playwright
- John Hardy (footballer) (1899–1932), English footballer
- John Herbert Hardy (1893–1969), British Army officer
- John Hardy, American producer of films such as Schizopolis
- John Hardy (minister), English minister who ran a dissenting academy in Nottingham
- John Hardy, founder of Hardy Brothers jewellers in 1853
- John Hardy (West Virginia politician), member of the lower house of West Virginia's legislature

== See also ==
- Jack Hardy (disambiguation)
- John Hardie (disambiguation)
- Sir John Francis Gathorne-Hardy (1874–1949), British First World War General who served in Italy and the Western Front
- John Gathorne-Hardy, 2nd Earl of Cranbrook (1839–1911), British peer and Conservative Member of Parliament
- John Hardee (1918–1984), American jazz musician
- Jonny Hardy (1934–2017), Israeli footballer
- Jonathan Hardy (1940–2012), New Zealand-born actor, writer and director
