= Marrison =

- Language: English

Origin
- Language: English
- Origin: 1. Mary + son 2. Marion + son 3. Mariot + son

Marrison is a surname. Notable people with the surname include:

- Colin Marrison (born 1985), English footballer
- Fernley Marrison (1891–1967), English cricketer
- Tom Marrison (1881–1926), English footballer
- Warren Marrison (1896–1980), Canadian engineer and inventor

== See also ==
- Harrison (name)
