= Kilwinning =

Coordinates: 55.655°N 04.703°W

Kilwinning: Scottish Gaelic: Cill D’Fhinnein; Scots: Kilwinnin
- Town and former civil parish
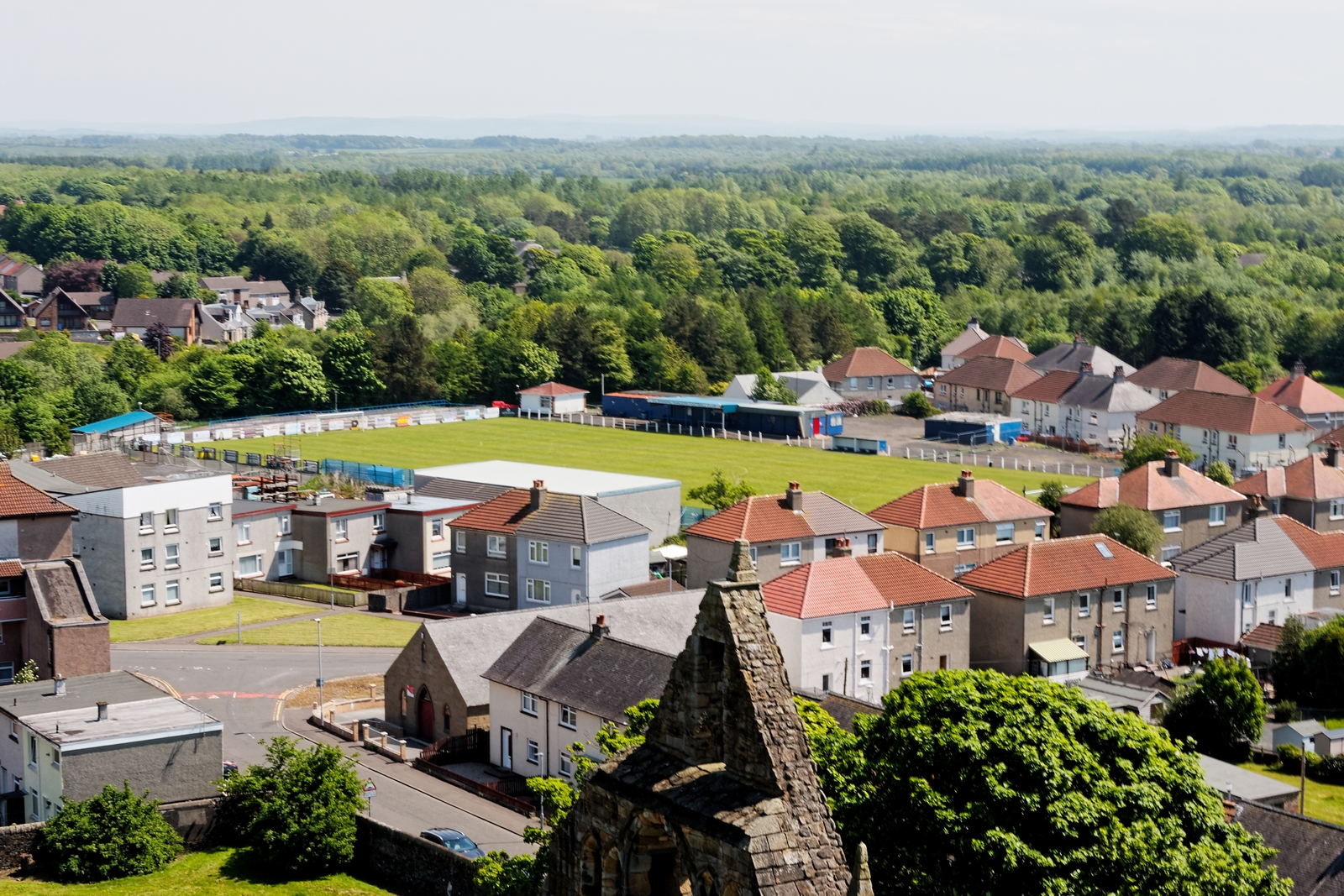
- Aerial view over Kilwinning with Abbey Park (now abandoned) in the centre, 2018

- Location within North Ayrshire
- Population: 16,100 (2020)
- OS grid reference: NS2943
  - Edinburgh: 65 miles (105 km)
  - London: 379 miles (610 km)
- Civil parish: Kilwinning
- Council area: North Ayrshire
- Lieutenancy area: Ayrshire and Arran
- Country: Scotland
- Sovereign state: United Kingdom
- Post town: KILWINNING
- Postcode district: KA13
- Dialling code: 01294
- Police: Scotland
- Fire: Scottish
- Ambulance: Scottish
- UK Parliament: North Ayrshire and Arran
- Scottish Parliament: Cunninghame South

Kilwinning (/kɪlˈwɪnɪŋ/, Scots: Kilwinnin; Scottish Gaelic: Cill D’Fhinnein) is a town in North Ayrshire, Scotland, located on the banks of the River Garnock in Ayrshire, about 21 miles (34 km) southwest of Glasgow. Kilwinning's neighbours are the coastal towns of Stevenston to the west and Irvine to the south, while inland lies Dalry to the north. It is known as "The Crossroads of Ayrshire". Kilwinning was also a Civil Parish. The 2001 Census recorded the town as having a population of 15,908. According to the 2022 census, the population of Kilwinning is around 16,990.

== History ==
Kilwinning dates back to the 8th century. The Kilwinning Community Archaeology Project carried out a dig in Kilwinning Abbey in 2010, which revealed much about the life of the people in the area during the medieval period.

According to John Hay, once the headmaster of the parish school in Kilwinning, "North Ayrshire has a history of religion stretching back to the very beginning of missionary enterprise in Scotland. The Celtic Christians or Culdees of the period of St Columba and St Mungo found here, in this part of Scotland, a fertile field for the propagation of the faith. Kilmarnock, Kilbride, Kilbirnie, are all, like Kilwinning, verbal evidence of the existence of 'Cillean' or cells of the Culdee or Celtic Church."

The original town was situated at the Bridgend and Corsehill while the other bank of the river was the site of the abbey, its outbuildings, orchards, doocot, etc.

The parish was in the ownership of Kelso Abbey from about 1140. Abbot Adam's Bridge, was constructed in mediaeval times with much of the original structure standing today. The bridge was widened in 1859.

After the dissolution of the monasteries, Kilwinning passed to the Earl of Eglinton. The Abbey church had been partly destroyed during the Reformation and a new parish church built in 1775. Lord Eglinton restored the Abbey church tower in 1789 and then replaced it in 1814.

== Toponymy ==
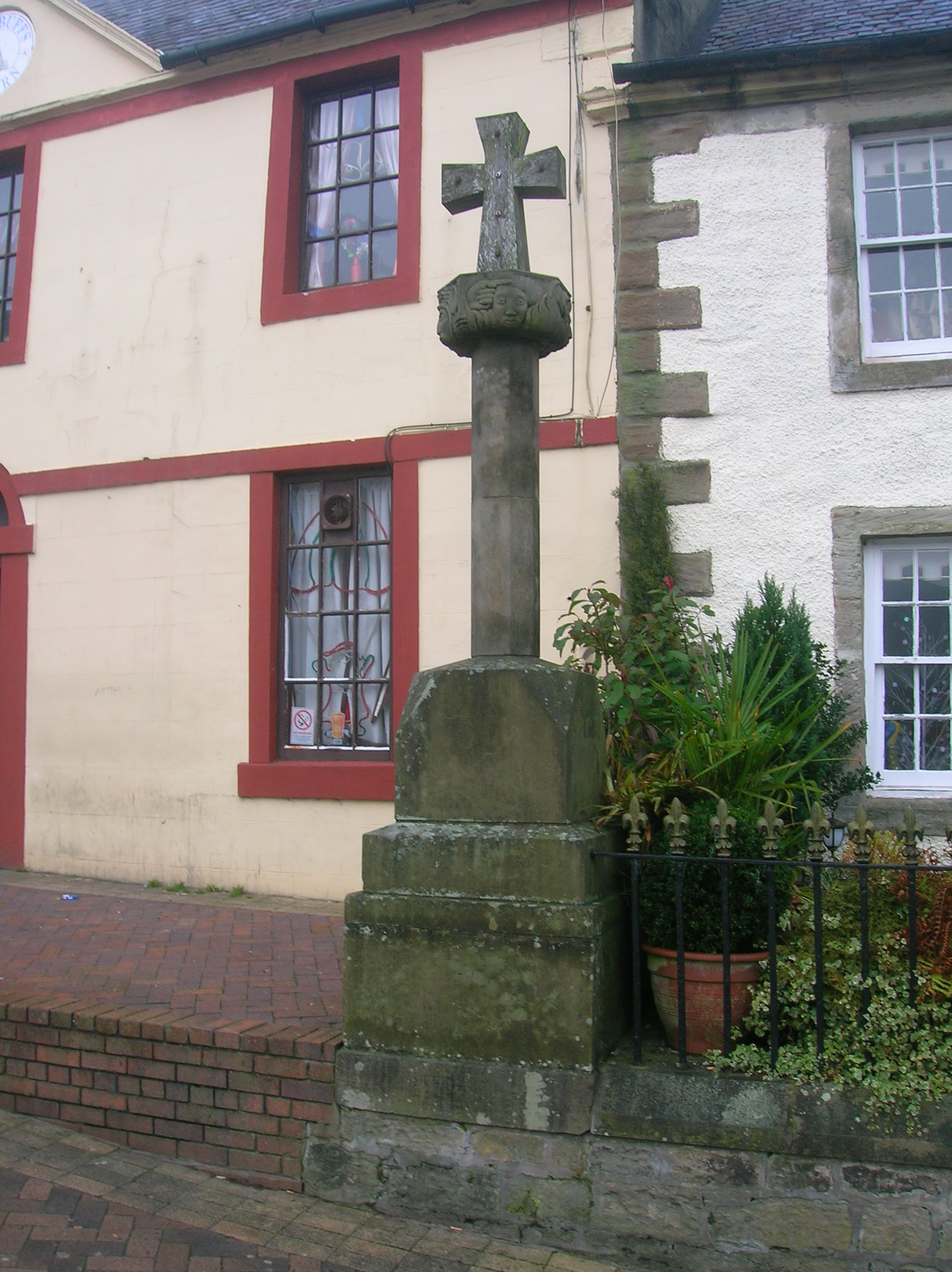
The Market Cross

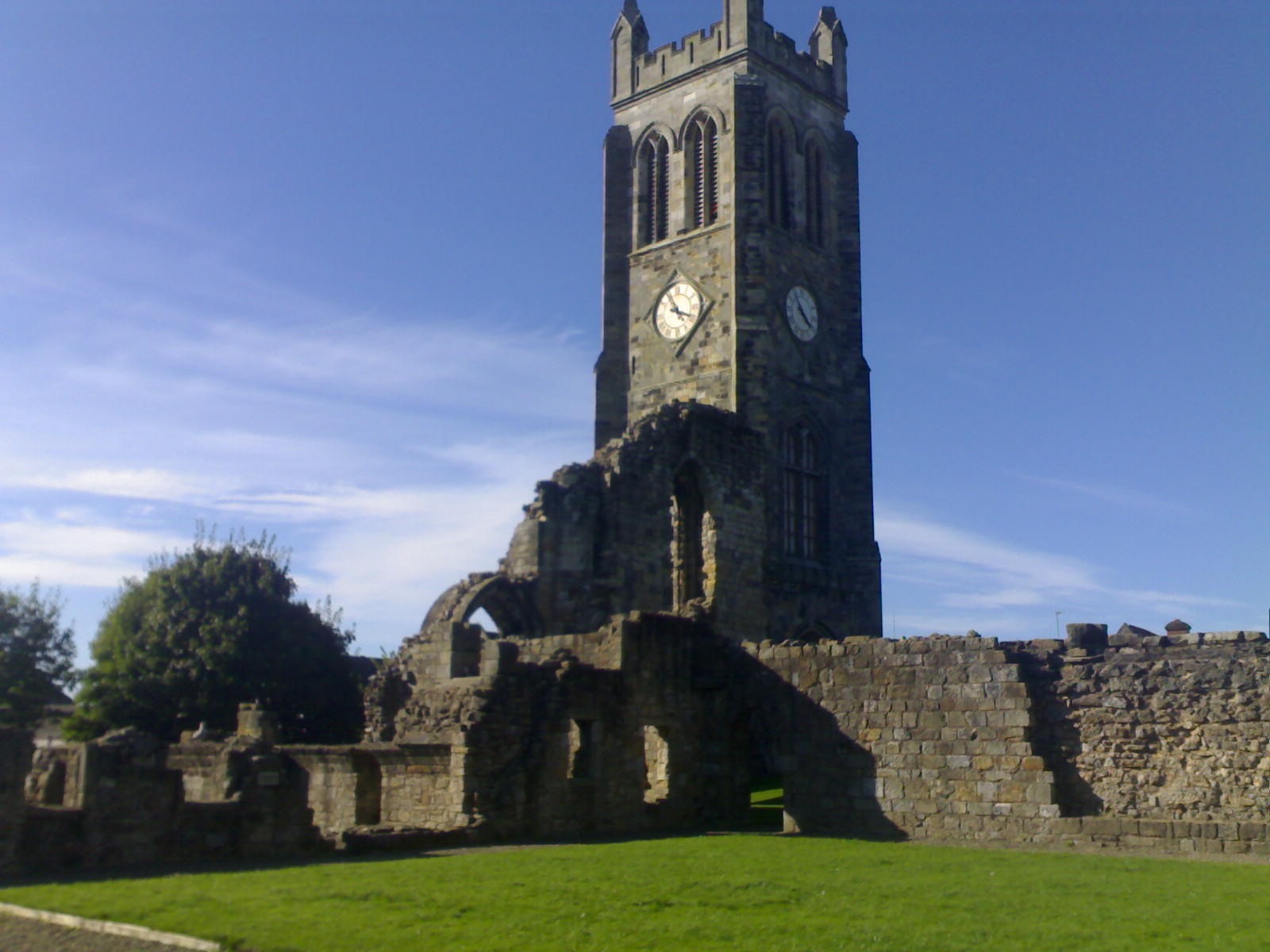
Kilwinning Abbey as it stands today

In the distant past, the town was called Sagtoun, or Saint's Town, after St. Winning, the founder of an early seventh-century church on this site. However, the actual identity of St. Winning is unclear. Some scholars have associated him with the Irish saint known as St Finnian of Moville, who died in the late sixth century. Others believe he was a Welshman by the name of Vynnyn, and the Aberdeen Breviary of 1507 asserts that he was from Scotland. The work of Professor Owen Clancy of the University of Glasgow in 2001 makes another identification possible. Clancy argued that, in fact, Saint Ninian and Saint Finnian were the same person, the difference being attributed to an error on the part of a medieval scribe. If that is so, then Ninian, who was a missionary to the Picts in Scotland, and Winning, who was deemed a Scotsman in the Aberdeen Breviary, could theoretically be one and the same as the Irishman named Finnian. The Aberdeen Breviary implies he was Irish. In early medieval times the term Scots/Scotland applied also to Ireland. It speaks of the saint originating from a Scottish province, setting sail with companions, and landing at Cunninghame in Lesser Scotland, the latter being a term used in those times to refer to the country which would later be designated by name Scotland.

== Masonic links ==
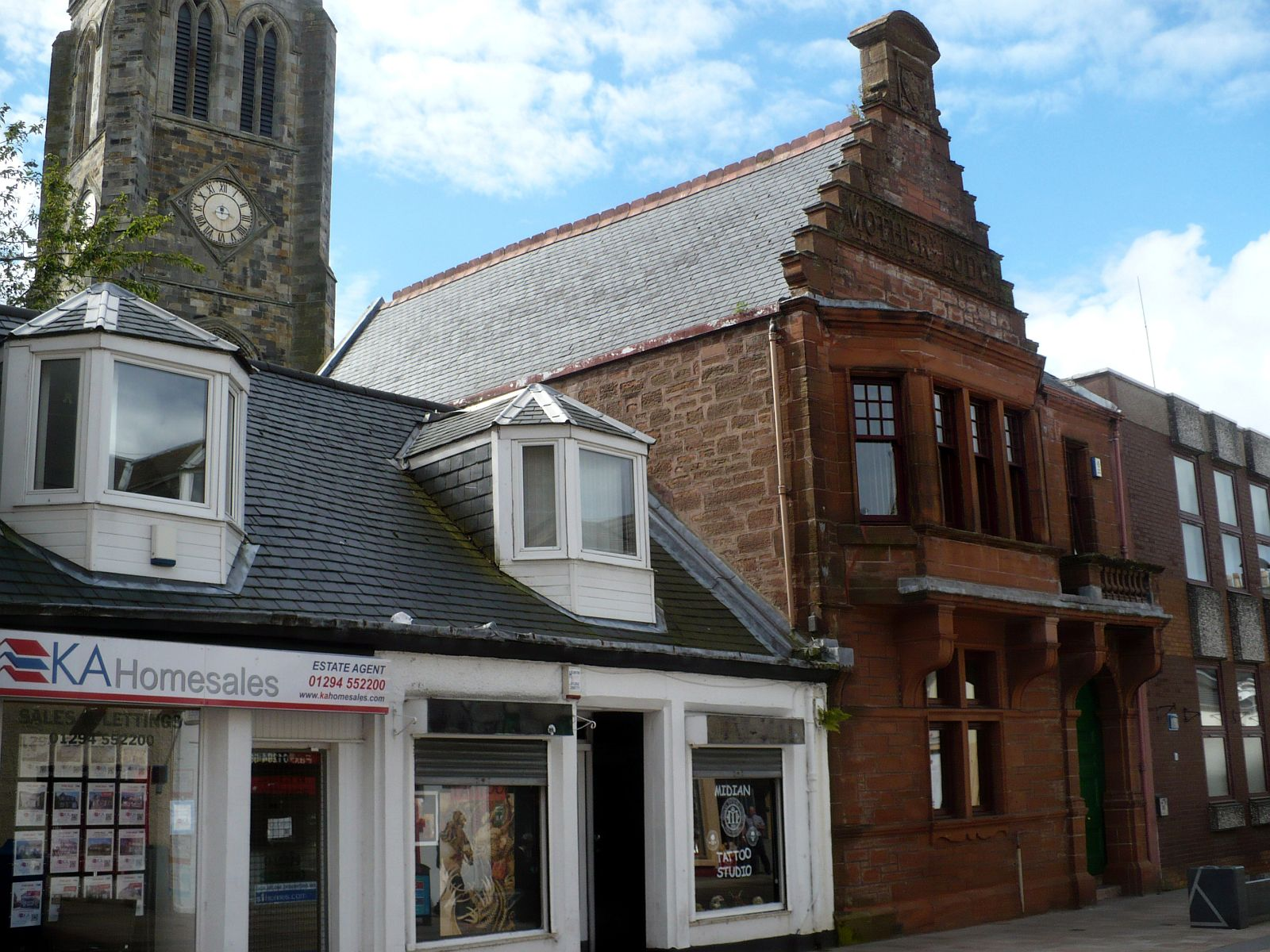
Mother Lodge building on Main St.

Kilwinning is notable for housing the original Lodge of Freemasonry in Scotland. When the Lodges were renumbered, Kilwinning was kept as Lodge Number '0', the Mother Lodge of Scotland.

The origin of the Lodge is unclear with the first documentary evidence being a mention in The Schaw Statutes of 1598 and 1599, which identify it in its first paragraph as the "heid and secund ludge of Scotland".

The lodge's own legend attributes the formation to the building of the Abbey at Kilwinning in the 12th century. There existed in this period corporations or fraternities of masons, endowed with certain privileges and immunities, capable of erecting religious structures in the Gothic style. A party of these foreign masons is supposed to have come from Italy, or Cologne, for the purpose of building the Abbey at Kilwinning and to have founded there the first regularly constituted Operative Lodge in Scotland. The Lodge is reputed to have been held in the chapter house on the eastern side of the cloisters. On the broken walls and moldering arches of the Abbey numerous and varied Masons' marks may be seen.

== Modern Kilwinning ==
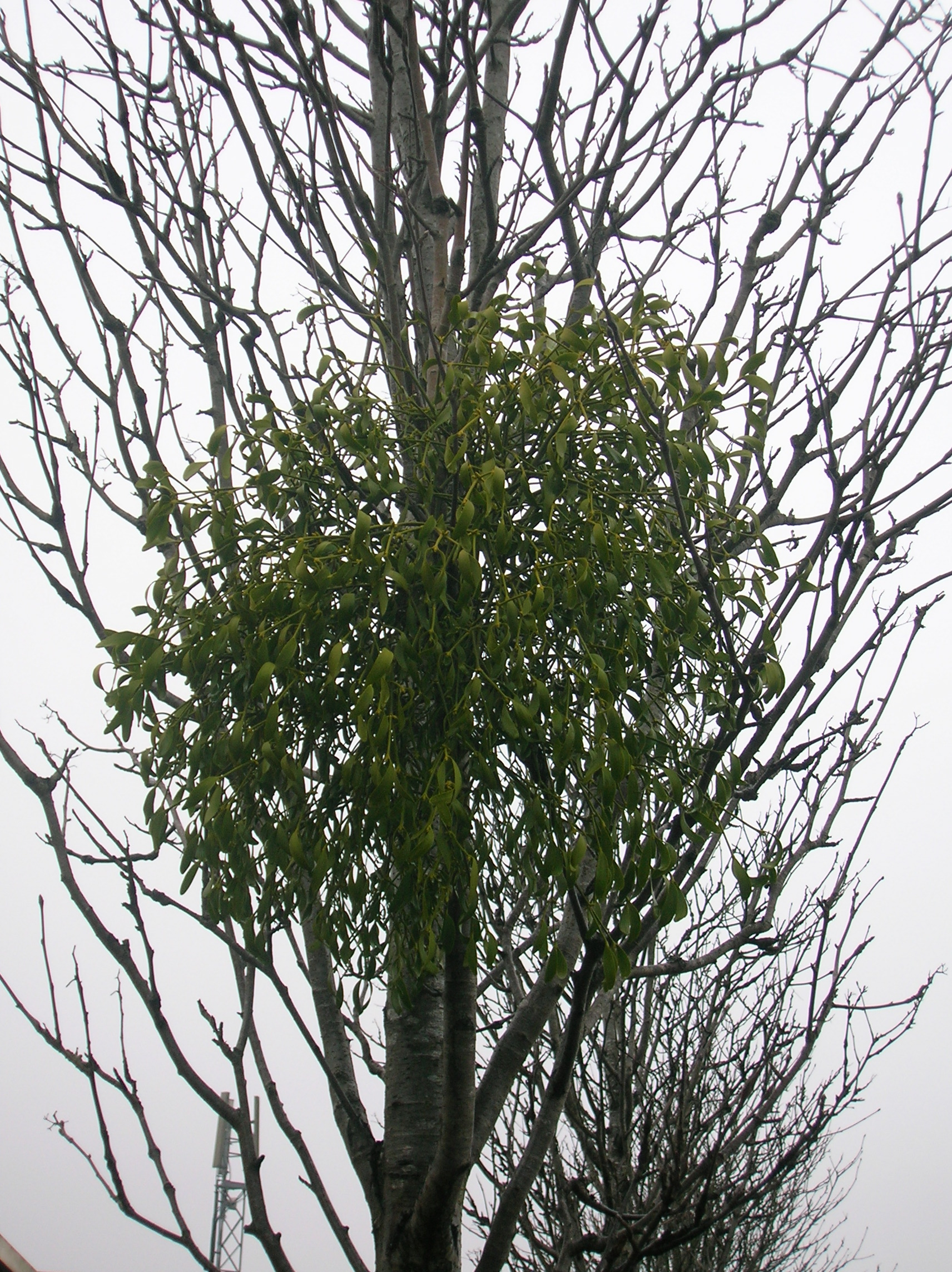
Mistletoe growing on a Rowan tree in Kilwinning town centre. A rare plant in Scotland.

In 1966, Kilwinning fell within the area designated Irvine New Town. Kilwinning rapidly expanded with new estates built on surrounding farm land to meet the planned increase in population.

Today Kilwinning consists of the pedestrianised historic town centre, Bridgend (originally a separate village), surrounded by the housing estates of Corsehill, Woodwynd, Blacklands, Pennyburn, Whitehirst Park and Woodside, with the last three being added after its incorporation into Irvine New Town. Kilwinning is a diverse town in terms of class and income with areas such as Whitehirst Park and Woodside being seen as more affluent and having higher house prices, whereas other parts of the town experience higher levels of deprivation, particularly the Blacklands. Kilwinning has a child poverty rate of 28%, higher than the national average of 24%.

Older residents sometimes refer to the Blacklands as the "Ironworks" after the Eglinton Iron Works which once occupied the land, the only surviving building of that time is now Nethermains Community Centre, although for many years the "slag hill" towered over the area. It was cleared in 1979, and the stone used to build the terminal at Hunterston, with the site being landscaped as Almswall Park.

The Main Street of Kilwinning has recently been refurbished as part of the regeneration of the Irvine Bay area by Irvine Bay Regeneration Company.

== Eglinton Castle and Country Park ==
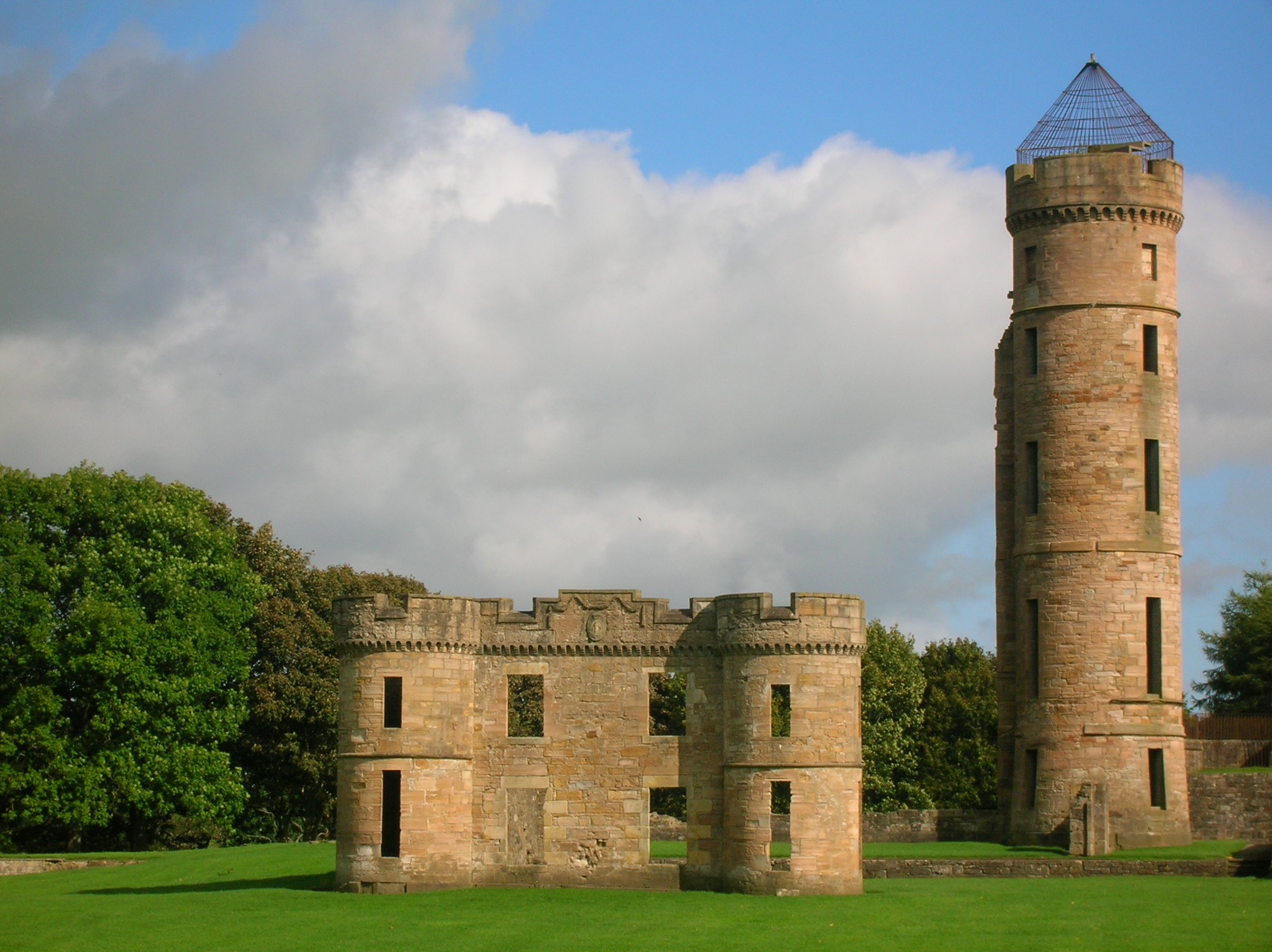
The ruins of Eglinton Castle

The ancient seat of the Earls of Eglinton, it is located just south of Kilwinning. Built between 1797 and 1802 in Gothic castellated style dominated by a central 100-foot (30 m) large round keep and four 70-foot (21 m) outer towers, it was second only to Culzean Castle in appearance and grandeur. The foundation stone of the new Eglinton Castle in Kilwinning was laid in 1797, the 12th Earl of Eglinton, was proud to have the ceremony performed by Alexander Hamilton of Grange, grandfather of the American Alexander Hamilton.

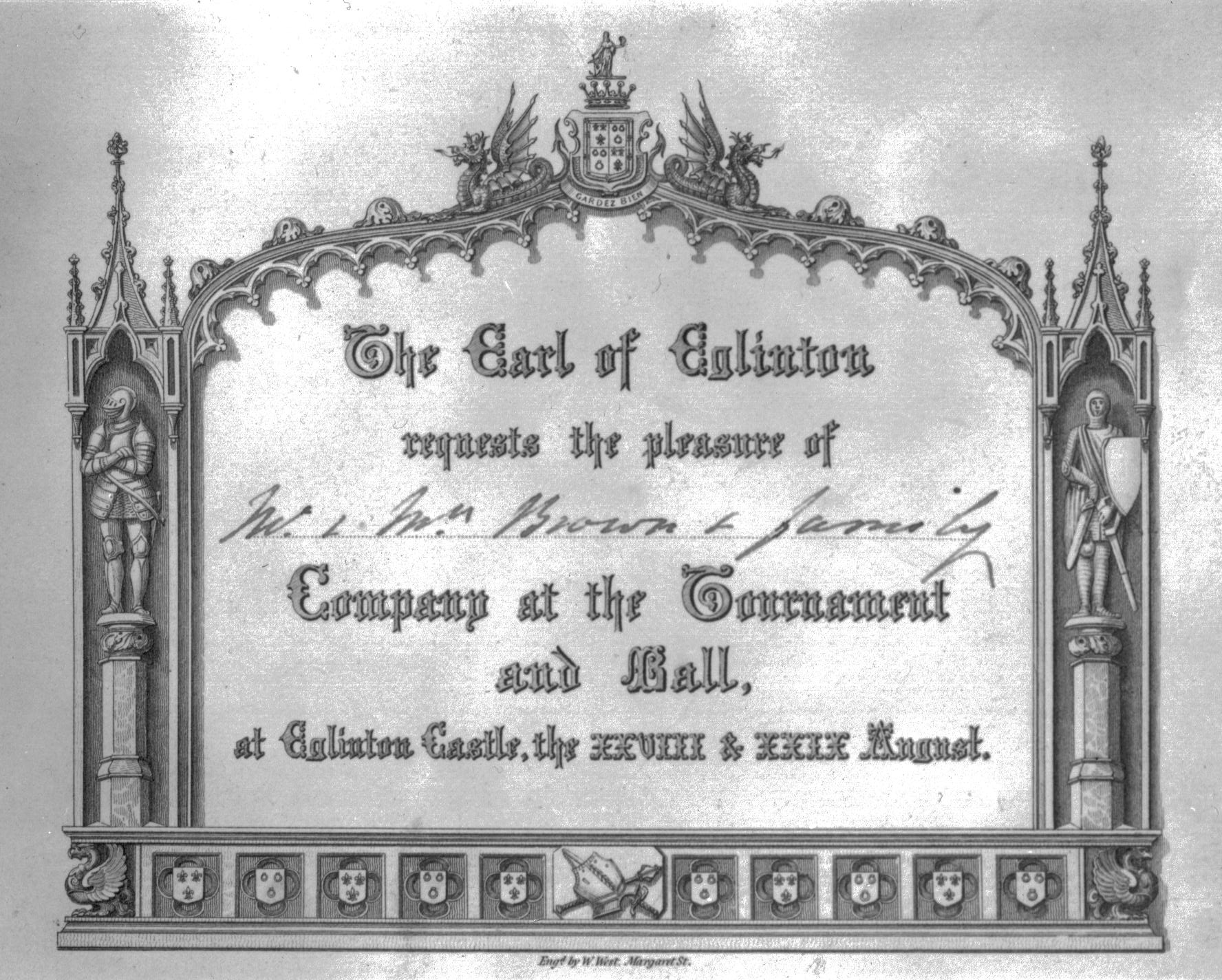
An official invitation to the 1839 Tournament

The castle is chiefly remembered, in modern times, as the scene of the Eglinton Tournament in 1839, which was a magnificent display. Funded and organized by Archibald Montgomerie, 13th Earl of Eglinton, the revival-medieval tournament, attracted thousands of visitors to see the combatants and the ladies in their finery. Among the guests was the future Emperor of the French—Napoleon III. The tournament was an ironic contrast between the old and the new! Excursion trains, among the first ever, were run from Ayr (pre-dating the formal opening of the line in 1840).

Today the castle is a ruin. The Tournament perhaps marked a turning point, being a severe drain on the Eglinton family fortune, which coincided with bottomless expenditure on the Ardrossan harbour and the Glasgow, Paisley and Ardrossan Canal. The castle fell into disrepair after being unroofed in 1925 and was used for Commando demolition practice during World War II, the remains were demolished to the level they are today in 1973. Eglinton Country Park is now a tourist attraction.

== Industry and commerce ==
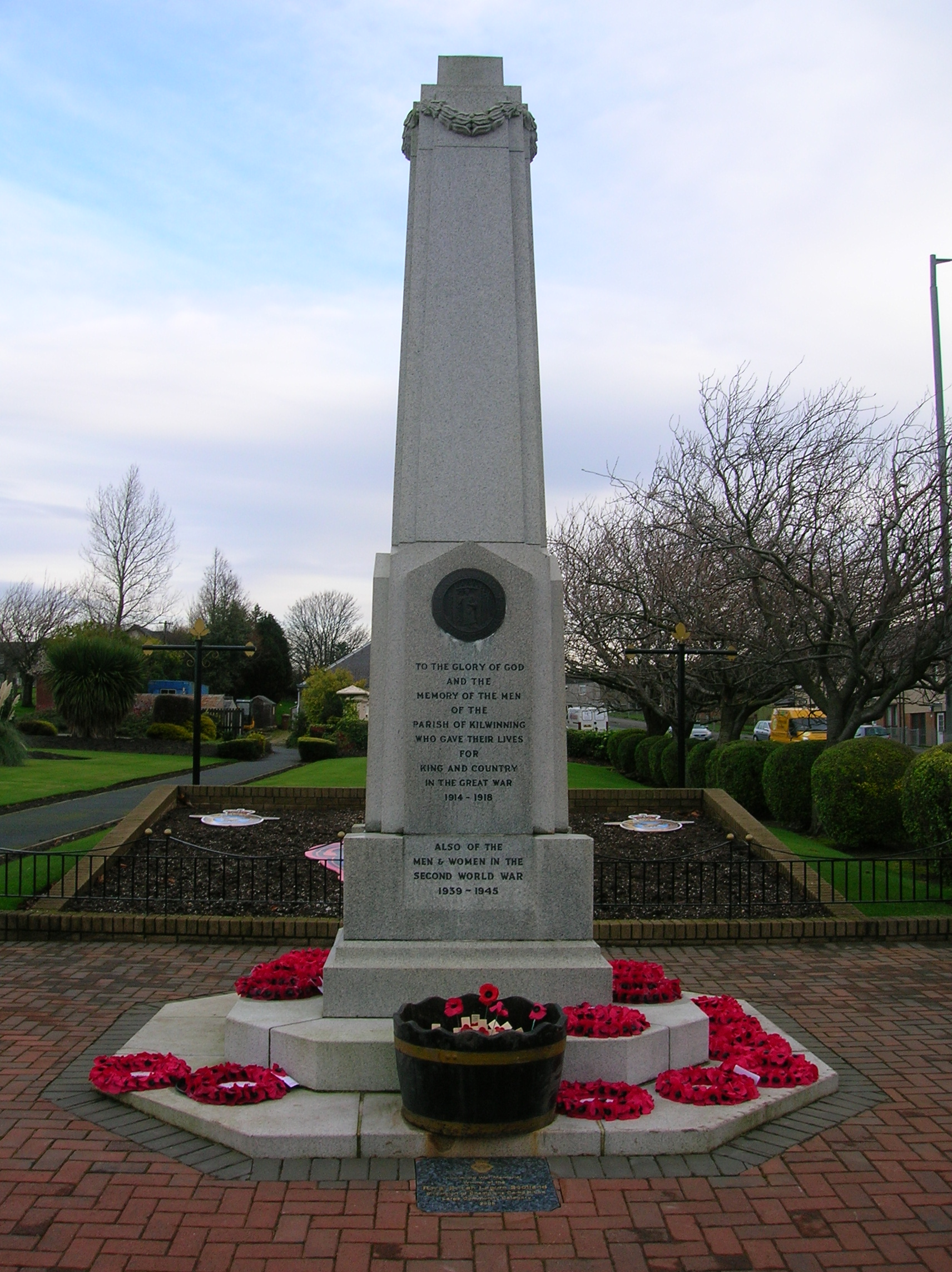
The Kilwinning War Memorial.

Kilwinning was a noted centre of Archery in medieval times. Later the town had an association with coal mining, quarrying, iron-founding and textile manufacture, now long since declined.

The Pringle knitwear company originally manufactured their goods in Kilwinning. Another company that existed was Wilson's Foods, which operated a plant in the grounds of the Eglinton Estate, but this has since closed.

The mill on the banks of the River Garnock briefly fell under the ownership of Blackwood Brothers of Kilmarnock before closing entirely. The site of the mill is largely unchanged, though part of the old factory has been demolished, and the former mill shop now operates as the offices and salesroom for a local car dealership that now uses the site.

The Nethermains Industrial Estate is home to many industrial units of the type commonly built in the 1960s and 1970s as modular units ideal for light industry. Fullarton Computer Industries are one of the large employers in this site. Modern Kilwinning's industries include the manufacture of plastics and electronics. Almost 1/4 of Kilwinning's workforce is employed by manufacturing.

== Transport ==
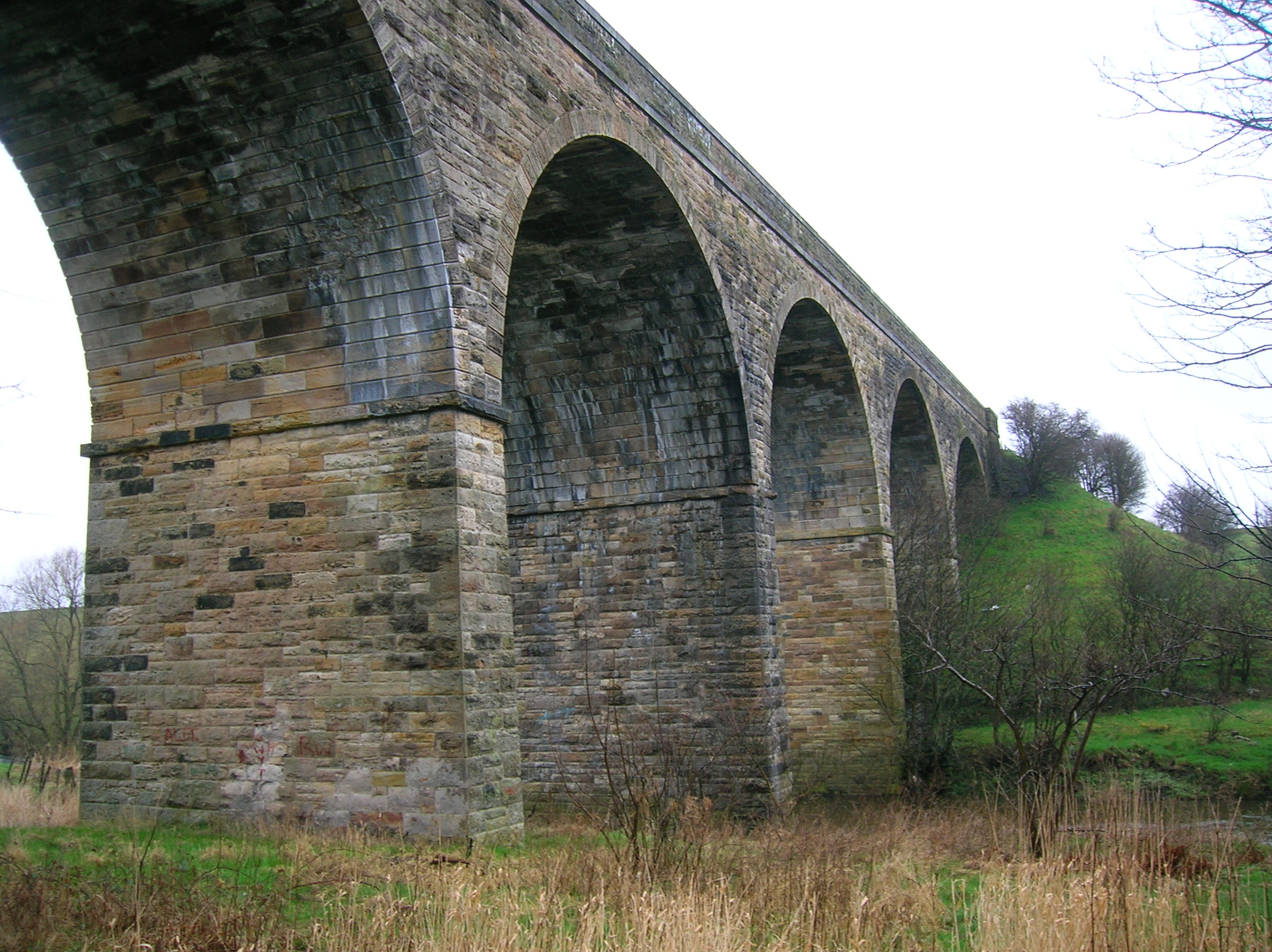
Kilwinning viaduct on the route leading to Kilwinning East railway station

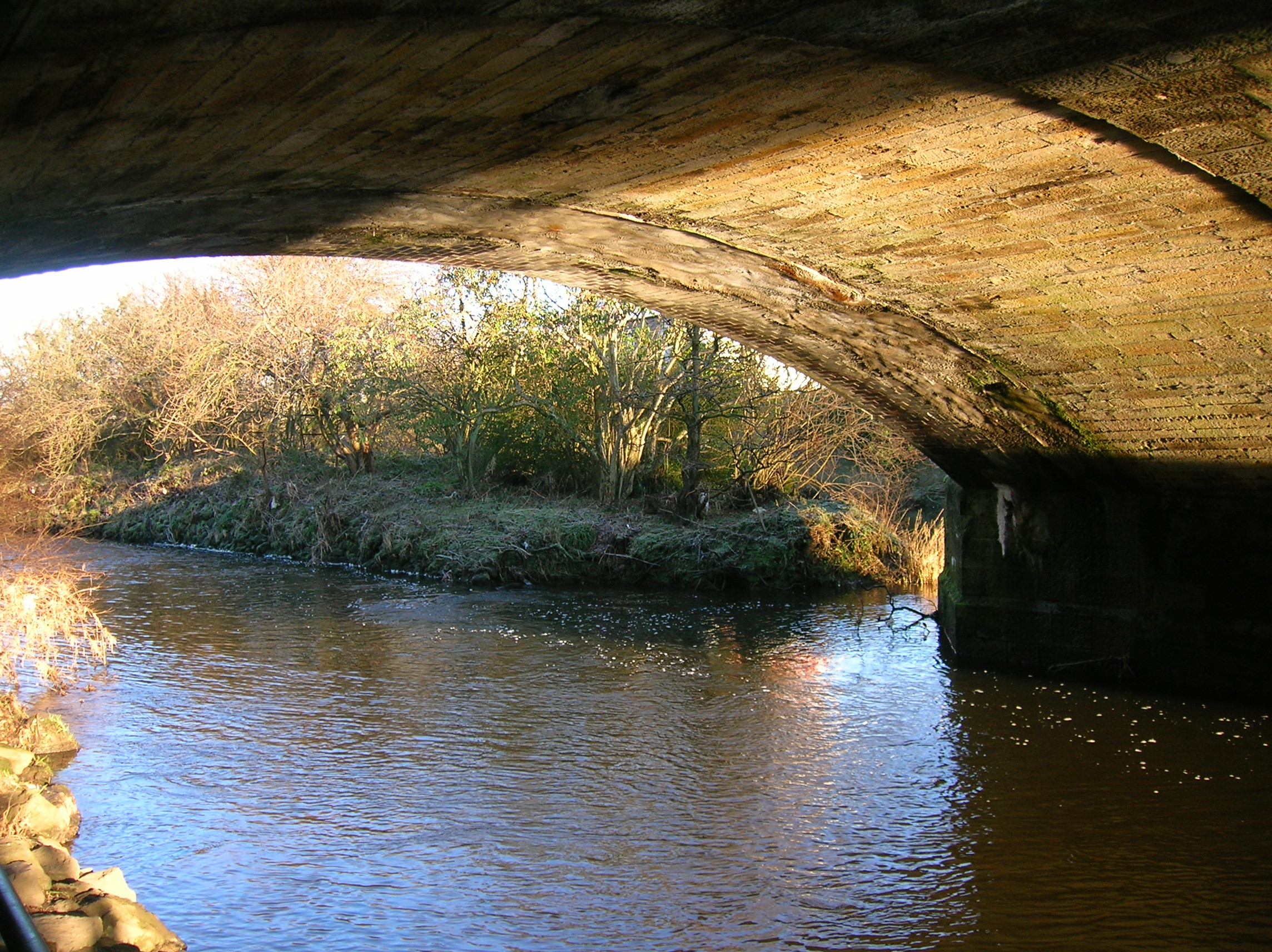
Kilwinning Bridge showing widening work and an Islet in the River Garnock that formed part of the old Bleaching Green

=== Rail ===
Kilwinning is on the Ayrshire Coast Line. The following services operate in Kilwinning:

- Glasgow Central – Largs + Ardrossan Harbour
- Glasgow Central – Ayr

=== Road ===
Kilwinning has road links with the rest of Ayrshire. The town is bypassed by the A78 dual carriageway, which provides connections to the A71 and A77 dual carriageways and the Glasgow bound M77 motorway.

=== Bus ===
Kilwinning is served by Stagecoach South Scotland and Shuttle Buses.

- 11 Ardrossan – Kilmarnock
- 25 Montgomerie Park / Bourtreehill / Broomlands / Irvine Cross – Kilbirnie / Beith
- 27 Irvine – Whitehurst Park (Mon – Sat Evenings Only)
- 29 Irvine / i3 Industrial Area – Whitehurst Park (Mon – Sat)
- 38 Riverway Retail Park – David Gage St (Mon – Sat)
- X34 Glasgow – Irvine Cross / Irvine railway station / Bourtreehill
- X36 Glasgow – Ardrossan

=== Air ===
Kilwinning is well served by Glasgow Prestwick Airport, which is only 12.9 miles (20.8 km) south on the A78 dual carriageway (around 21 min), or three stops on the train (around 14 min). Airline operators within the Airport maintain routes to many UK, European and North American destinations.

== Education ==
Kilwinning Academy is the only secondary school in Kilwinning. It was also served by St Michael's Academy, a catholic school, from 1921 until its demolition in 2007 when it was merged with St Andrew's Academy in nearby Saltcoats to create St Matthew's Academy.

Kilwinning is served by seven primary schools: Corsehill Primary School, Abbey Primary School, Blacklands Primary School, St Winning's Primary School, Pennyburn Primary School, Whitehirst Park Primary School and St Luke's Primary School.

James Watt College was built in Kilwinning in 1998 and opened in August of 2000. This brought some benefits to the town with increased revenue from the students supporting local businesses. In 2013, the campus became one of three Ayrshire College campuses, having merged with Kilmarnock College and Ayr College.

As of 2012, 37% of Kilwinning residents aged 16–74 had no formal qualifications; the national average was 33%.

There are a number of Community Halls in Kilwinning: Nethermains Community Centre, Cranberry Moss Community Centre, Whitehurst Community Centre, Pryde, The Woodwynd Hall and the Love Memorial Hall.

== Sport ==
=== Archery ===
The Ancient Society of Kilwinning Archers is believed to date back to 1483 and while records are only available from 1688, there is a reference in the early minutes, which would appear to confirm this assumption.

The sport still continues in Kilwinning to this very day. The annual papingo shoot is held in the grounds of the old Abbey on the first Saturday in June, when the wooden bird is mounted on a pole and suspended from the clock tower to allow the archers to attempt to dislodge the wings and then the bird itself. In 2014, Michael Portillo visited the Ancient Society of Kilwinning Archers during a visit to Kilwinning on his Great British Railway Journeys TV series for the BBC.

=== Football ===
Kilwinning Rangers F.C., or The Buffs as they are more affectionately known, play their home games at Buffs Park and compete in the top tier of the West of Scotland Football League (WoSFL). They play in blue and white hoops.

The team was formed in 1899 as a Juvenile football club, originally playing at Blacklands Park, which they shared with the then senior side of Eglinton Seniors. They officially became a Junior football club on 26 July 1902.

The name Buffs was first recorded on 21 September 1900 when the local paper, the Irvine Herald, recorded that the so-called Buffs had had an emphatic victory over Kilmarnock Belgrove. Kilwinning Rangers have had periods of success throughout their history, and were the first, and last Ayrshire Club to win the Scottish Junior Cup in the twentieth century.

Dirrans Athletic AFC were formed in 1946. They currently play in the Ayrshire Amateur Football League Premier Division.

Kilwinning Sports Club, or KSC as it is known locally, was launched in July 2002 in the Pennyburn area of Kilwinning.

In 2022, Kilwinning Rangers Amateurs became known as Eglinton F.C. and joined the fifth tier of the WoSFL.

The home grounds of all three teams are within the confines of KSC. KR at Buffs Park, Eglinton at Ian Cashmore Memorial Park (astro) and Dirrans at David Faddes Park.

== Notable residents ==
- Robert Baillie, (1602–1662), Covenanter, professor of divinity at the University of Glasgow, member of the Westminster Assembly and Presbyterian propagandist
- Helen Muir Bearpark (1942–1996), was born here and became a leading researcher into sleep in Australia.
- Bernard, Abbot of Kilwinning, Abbot of Arbroath and Bishop of the Isles
- Crawford Boyd, footballer
- Des Browne, politician
- Quintin Craufurd, author
- Joe Donnachie, footballer
- Hal Duncan, writer
- Henry Eckford, shipbuilder
- Julie Fleeting, footballer
- Colin Friels, actor
- Colin Hay, musician and lead singer of Men at Work
- Joseph Kain, American businessman and politician
- James MacMillan, composer
- Dougie McCracken, footballer
- Gerry McGowan, footballer
- Lewis Morrison, footballer
- Andrew O'Hagan, author and novelist
- James Service, Australian colonial politician, Premier of Victoria, born in Kilwinning in 1827
- Robert William Service, poet and writer, spent part of his childhood in Kilwinning with his grandfather
- Gordon Smith, footballer
- Penny Tranter, weather forecaster
- John White, Church of Scotland minister and twice Moderator of the General Assembly
- Lorna J Waite, academic, community activity and poet who wrote in Scots and English

== See also ==
- The Lands of Ashgrove, previously known as Ashenyards
