= Wann =

Wann or WANN may refer to:

- Wann, Nebraska
- Wann, Oklahoma
- WANN-CD, a television station based in Atlanta, Georgia
- WANN, the former call sign of radio station WBIS in Baltimore, Maryland
- Wann Formation, a geologic formation in Kansas and Oklahoma
- USS Walter C. Wann, a US Navy ship during World War II
- Wann River, a tributary of Tagish Lake in northern Canada
- We Are Not Numbers (WANN), English-language writing workshops for Palestinians in Gaza

== People named Wann ==
- Alpha Wann, member of French rap group 1995 (band)
- Dennis Wann (born 1950), English footballer
- Jim Wann, actor in musical Pump Boys and Dinettes
- Keith Wann (born 1969), American actor and comedian
- Marie Wann (1911–1996), American statistician
- Marilyn Wann (born 1966), American author and fat acceptance activist
- Norman G. Wann (1882–1957), American football player, track athlete, coach, and college athletics administrator
- Sandy Wann (born 1940), Scottish footballer
- Wann Rashidah (born 1970), a Malaysian singer
