= Arthur Cooper =

Arthur Cooper may refer to:

- Arthur Cooper (athlete) (born 1952), Trinidad and Tobago sprinter
- Arthur Cooper (footballer, born 1895) (1895–1964), English footballer
- Arthur Cooper (footballer, born 1921) (1921–2008), English footballer
- Arthur Cooper (translator) (1916–1988), British diplomat and translator of Chinese literature
- Arthur Charles Cooper (1864–1921), English-born Australian politician
- G. Arthur Cooper (1902–2000), American paleobiologist
- J. Arthur Cooper (1933–2025), American politician and academic

== See also ==
- Arthur Melbourne-Cooper (1874–1961), British photographer and filmmaker
