= John Hardie =

John Hardie may refer to:

- John Hardie (rugby union) (born 1988), New Zealand born Scottish rugby union player
- John Hardie (footballer) (born 1938), Scottish footballer
- John Leslie Hardie (1882–1956), Australian general

== See also ==
- John Hardy (disambiguation)
