= St Michael's Academy, Kilwinning =

Coordinates: 55.642°N 4.789°W

St. Michael's Academy
- Kilwinning, North Ayrshire; Scotland

Information
- Motto: "Aeterna Non Caduca" (Eternal Things Do Not Perish)
- Religious affiliation: Roman Catholic
- Established: 1921
- Closed: 2007

St Michael's Academy was a Roman Catholic secondary school in Kilwinning, North Ayrshire, Scotland. The secondary school served the Roman Catholic community of the towns of Irvine and Kilwinning and the villages of Beith, Kilbirnie and Dalry, which make up the Garnock Valley. Opened in Irvine in 1921, and located in Kilwinning from 1965, the school held over 800 pupils and 200 members of staff.

When St Michael's closed in 2007, a staff committee compiled a history of the 86 years, a paperback which sold out of 1000 copies in six months. Most (95%) of its contents were then adapted for the web by a now-retired staff member - the link is shown below.

A new school, St Matthew's Academy, was built in Saltcoats to accommodate pupils and staff from both the old St Michael's in Kilwinning and St Andrew's Academy. The new school opened in October 2007.

== History ==
Before 1921 Catholic children in Irvine, North Ayrshire attended primary classes in the existing St Mary's Church situated on West Road for their fundamental education, they then had to travel outside the Region to carry on any further education. In 1920 the Sisters of the Cross and Passion purchased Williamfield Estate on Kilwinning Road in the town to act as a convent and school which they staffed. They had their first intake of (7) pupils, November 1921. The new secondary, St. Michael's College, Irvine, opened in August 1923 followed by St. Mary's Primary in August 1928.

Then on 25 October 1939 the building was destroyed by fire, and as a stop gap, wooden huts were erected on the site so that the education could continue. The Second World War was soon to start leading to a period of deprivation and austerity which meant school building was now very low on the list of national priorities. This set up with the wooden school huts becoming increasingly overcrowded was to remain until the 1960s when the College moved to new premises costing £453,000 built in the neighbouring town of Kilwinning.

This new building was formally opened in June 1966 with Ayr County Council changing the name from College to Academy the following year. It was further extended as well as updated in 1984 and remained in use till 2007 when it closed its doors for the final time.

== Notable former pupils ==
- Desmond Henry Browne, Lord Browne of Ladyton, Politician for British Labour Party
- Bobby Lennox, footballer for Celtic F.C.
- Julie Fleeting, footballer for Arsenal L.F.C.
- Margaret Ford, Baroness Ford, Chairman of STV Group (Scotland).
- Benny Gallagher, singer-songwriter and member of Gallagher and Lyle
- Lou Macari, footballer for Celtic F.C., Manchester United F.C., and Scotland
