= Maurice Short =

English footballer

Personal information
- Full name: Maurice Short
- Date of birth: 29 December 1949
- Place of birth: Middlesbrough, England
- Position: Goalkeeper

Senior career*
Years	Team	Apps	(Gls)
1966-1970	Middlesbrough	19	(0)
1970–1971	Oldham Athletic	7	(0)
1971	→ Grimsby Town (loan)	10	(0)
- * Club domestic league appearances and goals

Maurice Short (born 29 December 1949) is an English former professional footballer who played as a goalkeeper.
