= Bill Waite =

Welsh footballer

Personal information
- Date of birth: 29 November 1917
- Place of birth: Newport, Wales
- Date of death: 1980 (age 62 or 63)
- Position: Centre forward

Youth career
- Newport County

Senior career*
Years	Team	Apps	(Gls)
1946–1947	Oldham Athletic	4	(4)
	Worcester City	?	(?)
- * Club domestic league appearances and goals

William J. Waite (born 29 November 1917) is a Welsh footballer who played as a centre forward in the Football League.

== See also ==
- Football in Wales
- List of football clubs in Wales
