= Robert Talbot (footballer) =

English footballer

Personal information
- Full name: Robert Curry Talbot
- Date of birth: 20 September 1908
- Place of birth: North Hylton, Sunderland, England
- Date of death: 1971 (aged 62–63)
- Place of death: Wigan, England
- Position: Full back

Senior career*
Years	Team	Apps	(Gls)
1930–1931	West Ham United	0	(0)
1931–1932	Burnley	0	(0)
1932–1933	Newport County	10	(0)
1933–1935	Wigan Athletic	?	(?)
1935–1936	Oldham Athletic	13	(0)
Total		23	(0)
- * Club domestic league appearances and goals

Robert Curry Talbot (20 September 1908 – 1971) was an English professional footballer who played as a full back. He played for four clubs in the Football League during the 1930s, making 23 league appearances.
