= Jack Hardy (footballer) =

Australian rules footballer

Personal information
- Full name: Jack Hardy
- Born: 10 April 1927
- Died: 31 March 1998 (aged 70)
- Original team: University Blacks / Essendon Reserves
- Height: 166 cm (5 ft 5 in)
- Weight: 67 kg (148 lb)

Playing career^{1}
Years	Club	Games (Goals)
1949	Carlton	4 (0)
- ^{1} Playing statistics correct to the end of 1949.

Jack Hardy (10 April 1927 – 31 March 1998) was an Australian rules footballer who played with Carlton in the Victorian Football League (VFL).
