= Jack Roscoe =

English footballer (1906–1969)

Personal information
- Full name: Jack Houghton Roscoe
- Date of birth: 28 January 1906
- Place of birth: Oldham, England
- Date of death: 1969 (aged 62–63)
- Place of death: Oldham, England
- Position: Centre forward

Senior career*
Years	Team	Apps	(Gls)
- Werneth Athletic
1926–1928	Witton Albion		
1928–1931	Mossley		
1931–1932	Oldham Athletic	19	(8)
1932	Chester	1	(1)
1932–1934	Macclesfield Town	70	(50)
1934–1938	Hyde United	151	(98)
1938–1939	Mossley		
- * Club domestic league appearances and goals

Jack Houghton Roscoe (28 January 1906 – 1969) was an English footballer who played as a centre forward in the Football League for Oldham Athletic and Chester. He also played in non-league football for Werneth Athletic, Witton Albion, Mossley (two spells, during which he scored 178 goals from 187 appearances in all competitions), Macclesfield Town and Hyde United.
