= Edgar Smithurst =

English footballer

Personal information
- Full name: Edgar Ishmael Smithurst
- Date of birth: 5 November 1895
- Place of birth: Eastwood, Nottinghamshire, England
- Date of death: April 1978, aged 82
- Place of death: Rotherham, England
- Height: 5 ft 8 in (1.73 m)
- Position: Right winger

Senior career*
Years	Team	Apps	(Gls)
19??−1920	Oldham Athletic		
1920−1921	West Ham United	3	(0)
1921–1922?	Chesterfield	14	(1)
1922?–1923?	Doncaster Rovers		(1)
- * Club domestic league appearances and goals

Edgar Smithurst (5 November 1895 − April 1978) was an English footballer who played as a right winger with Oldham Athletic, West Ham United, Chesterfield, and Doncaster Rovers.

== Playing career ==
=== Oldham Athletic ===
Born in Eastwood, Nottinghamshire, Smithurst is first known for playing at Oldham Athletic who were in the First Division.

=== West Ham United ===
In early 1920, he was signed by Second Division club West Ham United. He played three games before leaving for Chesterfield for £100 in August 1921.

=== Chesterfield ===
In the 1921–22 season Chesterfield were a founding club of the Football League Third Division North, but despite the drop in leagues, Smithurst was soon moved on to an even lower league level. He made 14 League appearances, scoring once in a 6–1 defeat at Wrexham when he delivered a high centre into the Wrexham area and the flight of the ball deceived the Wrexham keeper.

=== Doncaster Rovers ===
He arrived at Midland League side Doncaster Rovers part way through the 1921–22 season. In what was a mid-table season, he scored just one goal, a penalty in a 1–0 victory at Mexborough Town. The following season he played in the first game at their new ground, Low Pastures which was to become known as Belle Vue, in front of which was then Doncaster's highest ever home crowd of around 10,000.
