= Cornelius C. White =

American politician

Cornelius Clark White

Member of the Missouri House of Representatives from the Scott County district
- In office 1929–1933

Personal details
- Born: May 2, 1870 Bertrand, Missouri
- Died: April 7, 1940 Sikeston, Missouri
- Party: Democratic
- Spouse(s): Tillie White (1895-1896 died); Allie Work (1902-1940)
- Education: State Teachers College in Cape Girardeau
- Occupation: politician, druggist

Cornelius Clark White (May 2, 1870 - April 7, 1940) was an American politician from Scott County, Missouri, who served as mayor of Sikeston and in the Missouri House of Representatives. He worked as a druggist in the Missouri cities of Bertrand, Belmont, Cardwell, New Madrid, and Sikeston. White died in 1940 and was pronounced dead by Dr. G. W. H. Presnell, mayor of Sikeston.
