= Alan Halsall (footballer) =

Welsh footballer

Personal information
- Full name: Alan Halsall
- Date of birth: 17 November 1940 (age 85)
- Place of birth: Menai Bridge, Wales
- Position: Goalkeeper

Youth career
- Skelmersdale United

Senior career*
Years	Team	Apps	(Gls)
1961–1962	Blackpool	2	(0)
1963–1964	Oldham Athletic	2	(0)
1964–1969	Wigan Athletic	153	(0)
- * Club domestic league appearances and goals

Alan Halsall (born 17 November 1940) was an association football goalkeeper who played in The Football League for Blackpool and Oldham Athletic. He moved to Wigan Athletic in 1964, making 150 appearances for the club in the Cheshire League. He made a further three appearances in the inaugural Northern Premier League season before leaving the club in 1969.
