= Steven Bullock (footballer) =

English footballer (born 1966)

Personal information
- Date of birth: 5 October 1966 (age 60)
- Place of birth: Stockport, England
- Position: Defender

Senior career*
Years	Team	Apps	(Gls)
1983–1986	Oldham Athletic	18	(0)
1986–1987	Tranmere Rovers	30	(1)
1987–1991	Stockport County	120	(0)
1991–1993	Brisbane United	44	(1)
Total		212	(2)
- * Club domestic league appearances and goals

Steven Bullock (born 5 October 1966) is a footballer who played as a defender in the Football League for Oldham Athletic, Tranmere Rovers, Stockport County and Brisbane United in Australia's National Soccer League.
