= Roy Player =

English footballer

Personal information
- Full name: Percival Roy Ivan Player
- Date of birth: 10 May 1928
- Place of birth: Portsmouth, England
- Date of death: April 1992 (age 63)
- Place of death: Rutland, England
- Position: Centre half

Senior career*
Years	Team	Apps	(Gls)
	Portsmouth	?	(?)
1952–1959	Grimsby Town	57	(0)
1959–1960	Oldham Athletic	2	(0)
	Gainsborough Trinity	?	(?)
	Spalding United	?	(?)
Total		59	(0)
- * Club domestic league appearances and goals

Percival Roy Ivan Player (10 May 1928 – 1992), was an English footballer who played as a centre half in the Football League.

Player was born in Portsmouth, Hampshire, England. He came to the attention of Grimsby Town while serving in the locality with the RAF, and signed professional forms in 1953. In five years with the club he made a total of 57 appearances, before transferring to Oldham Athletic in 1959. In his one season at Boundary Park he made just two appearances before moving into non-league football in August 1960 when he joined Gainsborough Trinity.
