= Gerry McGowan (Scottish footballer) =

Scottish footballer

Personal information
- Full name: Gerard James McGowan
- Date of birth: 4 August 1944 (age 82)
- Place of birth: Kilwinning, Scotland
- Position: Left winger

Senior career*
Years	Team	Apps	(Gls)
1965–1966	Oldham Athletic	5	(1)
1966–1967	Hyde United	33	(12)
- Buxton
- Petershill
- * Club domestic league appearances and goals

Gerard James McGowan (born 4 August 1944) is a Scottish former footballer who played as a left winger in the English Football League.
