= Arthur Cooper (footballer, born 1895) =

English footballer

Personal information
- Full name: Arthur Cooper
- Date of birth: 1895
- Place of birth: Sheffield, England
- Date of death: 1964 (aged 68–69)
- Position: Goalkeeper

Senior career*
| Years | Team | Apps | (Gls) |
| 1913–1914 | Three clubs (Note: Beighton Recreation, Sheffield Wednesday, and loans.) | 50 | (0) |
| 1914–1915 | Birmingham | 10 | (0) |
| 1919–1922 | Barnsley | 100 | (0) |
| 1922–1923 | Oldham Athletic | 10 | (0) |
| Total | | 170 | (0) |
- * Club domestic league appearances and goals

Arthur Cooper (August 1894 – April 1964) was an English footballer who played in the Football League for Sheffield Wednesday, Barnsley and Oldham Athletic.

THE GREEN 'Un (Sheffield sports newspaper) recorded Cooper's debut with Sheffield Wednesday (the Owls) on 14 October 1916, when they were away at Leeds in front of a 5,000-strong crowd. Although Leeds won 1–0, Cooper grabbed the headlines due to a string of top-class saves, some from "awkward" angles. He'd joined the Hillsborough team from Sheffield Minor League champions Beighton Recreation.

A scarcity of quality players led to Cooper not only appearing that season in Wednesday's colours in league and cup games, but also for Chesterfield, Beighton, and non-league Silverwood Colliery. His appearances were often accompanied by glowing write-ups which led to him signing for Barnsley at the cessation of hostilities.

In November 1917, Cooper played for Pennington's XI in front of 18,000 spectators at Bramall Lane, in a War Charities fund-raiser game featuring no fewer than 14 internationals. Jesse Pennington was an England player capped 25 times who played for West Brom as a left-back. The opponents were Wilson's XI, captained by Arthur Wilson who, during his 20-year career at Hillsborough (1900–1920) played for the Owls 501 times, scoring 199 goals, as centre-forward. He also played six times for Scotland. At Wednesday he won the Football League in 1903 and 1904, and the FA Cup in 1907. He holds the club's all-time records for appearances made and goals scored. Wilson scored a hat-trick and saw his team win 3–1.

On 1 January 1918 he switched his goalie gloves for the centre-half's position in an appearance for Tinsley Colliery "where he proved as good outfield as he did between the sticks" (stated The Green 'Un). During the 1917–18 season, he also appeared on a short loan to Grimsby after their 'keeper got injured, and also for Birmingham. The latter commitment saw him sign for the Blues, appearing for them 10 times, and later moved to Oakwell. His final season was at Oldham 1922–23 after a £200 transfer from Barnsley. The season's highlight for Arthur was playing in goal at Anfield on Boxing Day in front of 40,000 people when Liverpool won 2–1. He then hung up his gloves at the end of the season and returned to the steel industry in Sheffield, living at 28 Talbot Road. During the Great War, matches were played but not under the same structure as in peacetime but it is clear from reports in the local and national press that Cooper played some 50 matches – coupled with his reserved occupation as a steelworker engaged on war work.
