= John Hardy (footballer) =

English footballer

Personal information
- Full name: John James Hardy
- Date of birth: 10 February 1899
- Place of birth: Sunderland, England
- Date of death: 1932 (aged 32–33)
- Height: 6 ft 1 in (1.85 m)
- Position: Centre-half

Senior career*
Years	Team	Apps	(Gls)
1919–1920	Wearmouth Colliery		
1920–1921	Sunderland Celtic		
1921–1924	South Shields	102	(5)
1924–1925	Derby County	3	(0)
1925–1927	Grimsby Town	46	(4)
1927	Oldham Athletic	2	(0)
1927–1929	South Shields	11	(0)
1929–1930	Boldon Colliery Welfare		
1930	Scarborough		
1930–1931	West Stanley		
1931–1932	Clapton Orient	0	(0)
1932	Silksworth Colliery		
- * Club domestic league appearances and goals

John James Hardy (10 February 1899 – 1932) was an English professional footballer who played as a centre-half.
