= Cornelius White (footballer) =

English footballer

Personal information
- Date of birth: 10 March 1901
- Place of birth: Leicester, England
- Date of death: 1975 (aged 74)
- Place of death: Leicester, England
- Position: Centre forward

Senior career*
Years	Team	Apps	(Gls)
- Whitwick Imperial
- Birmingham
- Oldham Athletic
- Llandudno
- Bangor City
1928–1929	Bradford City	4	(4)
- Hereford United
- Loughborough Corinthians
- Nuneaton Town
- * Club domestic league appearances and goals

Cornelius White (10 March 1901 – 1975) was an English professional footballer who played as a centre forward.

== Career ==
Born in Leicester, White spent his early career with Whitwick Imperial, Birmingham, Oldham Athletic, Llandudno and Bangor City. White signed for Bradford City from Bangor City in June 1928, and scored 4 goals in 4 league appearances for the club, before moving to Hereford United in June 1929. He later played for Loughborough Corinthians and Nuneaton Town.

== Sources ==
- Frost, Terry (1988). Bradford City A Complete Record 1903-1988. Breedon Books Sport. ISBN 0-907969-38-0.
