= Sandy Wann =

Scottish footballer

Personal information
- Full name: Alexander Halley Wann
- Date of birth: 20 December 1940 (age 85)
- Place of birth: Stanley, Perthshire, Scotland
- Position: Wing half

Senior career*
Years	Team	Apps	(Gls)
	Luncarty	?	(?)
1958–1960	Manchester City	0	(0)
1960	St Mirren	0	(0)
1960–1961	Oldham Athletic	19	(0)
1961–1962	Forfar Athletic	19	(0)
1963–1964	Northwich Victoria	?	(?)
Total		38	(0)
- * Club domestic league appearances and goals

Alexander Halley Wann (born 20 December 1940) is a Scottish footballer, who played as a wing half in the Football League.
