= Tom Marrison =

English footballer

Personal information
- Full name: Thomas Marrison
- Date of birth: 1881
- Place of birth: Darnall, England
- Date of death: 1926 (aged 44–45)
- Position: Inside forward

Senior career*
Years	Team	Apps	(Gls)
1902–1905	The Wednesday	5	(1)
1905–1906	Rotherham Town		
1906–1911	Nottingham Forest	163	(39)
1911–1912	Oldham Athletic	17	(4)
1912–1913	Bristol City	13	(1)
Total		198	(45)
- * Club domestic league appearances and goals

Thomas Marrison (1881–1926) was an English footballer who played in the Football League for Bristol City, Nottingham Forest, Oldham Athletic and The Wednesday.
