= St Andrew's Academy, North Ayrshire =

Catholic school in North Ayrshire, Scotland

Coordinates: 55.641°N 4.789°W

- Saltcoats, North Ayrshire; Scotland

Information
- Religious affiliation: Catholic
- Established: 1971
- Closed: 2007

St Andrew's Academy was a Roman Catholic secondary school from 1971 to 2007 in the seaside town of Saltcoats, North Ayrshire, Scotland. It was named after the patron saint of Scotland, Saint Andrew.

== History ==
The school building on Jacks Road originally opened in August 1961 as Saltcoats Junior Secondary School and was used for 10 years. It became St Andrews Academy in 1971.

The school was formed in 1971 when the education system changed from senior and junior secondary schools to a comprehensive system. Previously, Roman Catholic pupils who passed the old 11+ exam attended the Senior Secondary at St Michael's in Kilwinning. Those who failed attended St Peter's Junior Secondary in Ardrossan. The 'new' St Andrew's was the old Saltcoats Junior Secondary School, which ceased to exist when the new Auchenharvie Academy opened in Stevenston in 1971. St Andrew's had a very large catchment area, taking pupils from Largs, West Kilbride/Seamill, Ardrossan, Saltcoats and Stevenston.

St Andrews always excelled both academically and on the sporting field. The school always acquitted itself well in the government league tables.

== Closure ==
The school was closed and demolished in 2007. It was merged with St Michael's Academy, Kilwinning. Pupils were educated in St. Matthew's Academy, which first opened October 29, 2007. St. Matthew's Academy was built directly next to St. Andrew's and, as of October 2008, it had 1392 pupils. As of 2020, it had 1240 pupils.

== Notable former pupils ==
- Roy Aitken, former Celtic captain and now assistant manager for Birmingham City
- Jim Delahunt, footballing pundit, ex-presenter of Scotsport, then with Irish-based satellite channel Setanta
- Mark Reid, former Celtic player
