= Frank McCormack (footballer) =

Scottish footballer

Personal information
- Full name: Francis Adamson McCormack
- Date of birth: 25 September 1924
- Place of birth: Glasgow, Scotland
- Date of death: 6 April 2011 (aged 86)
- Place of death: Glasgow, Scotland
- Position: Centre half

Senior career*
Years	Team	Apps	(Gls)
	Parkhead	?	(?)
1946–1949	Clyde	82	(1)
1949–1950	Oldham Athletic	14	(0)
1953–1954	Greenock Morton	1	(0)
Total		97	(1)
- * Club domestic league appearances and goals

Francis Adamson McCormack (25 September 1924 – 6 April 2011) was a Scottish footballer who played as a centre half in the Football League.
