= 2019–20 Oldham Athletic A.F.C. season =

Oldham Athletic
2019–20 season
- Chairman: Abdallah Lemsagam
- Head Coach: Laurent Banide (until 19 September); Dino Maamria (from 19 September)
- Stadium: Boundary Park
- League Two: 19th
- FA Cup: Second round
- EFL Cup: First round
- EFL Trophy: Group stage
Home colours	Away colours

The 2019–20 season was Oldham Athletic's 125th season in their history and second consecutive season in the English football's fourth tier. Along with competing in League Two, the club also participated in the FA Cup, EFL Cup, and EFL Trophy.

The season covered the period from 1 July 2019 to 30 June 2020.

== Transfers ==
=== Transfers in ===
Date	Position	Nationality	Name	From	Fee	Ref.
1 July 2019	CB	(Scotland)	Alex Iacovitti	(England) Nottingham Forest	Free transfer	
1 July 2019	RB	(England)	Zak Mills	(England) Morecambe	Free transfer	
1 July 2019	GK	(England)	Gary Woods	(Scotland) Hamilton Academical	Free transfer	
19 July 2019	CF	(England)	Scott Wilson	(England) Macclesfield Town	Free transfer	
22 July 2019	RW	(France)	Marvin Kokos	(France) Gazélec Ajaccio	Undisclosed	
23 July 2019	CF	(Benin)	Désiré Segbé Azankpo	(Slovakia) FK Senica	Undisclosed	
27 July 2019	RW	(England)	Chris Eagles	Free agent	Free transfer	
30 July 2019	FW	(England)	Kielen Adams	(England) Bradford City	Free transfer	
30 July 2019	MF	(France)	Dylan Fage	(France) AJ Auxerre	Free transfer	
30 July 2019	MF	(France)	Florian Gonzales	(France) AJ Auxerre	Free transfer	
1 August 2019	AM	(England)	Callum Dolan	(England) Altrincham	Free transfer	
1 August 2019	CB	(Czech Republic)	Tomáš Egert	(England) Burton Albion	Free transfer	
1 August 2019	CB	(England)	David Wheater	(England) Bolton Wanderers	Free transfer	
30 August 2019	LW	(England)	Dominic McHale	(England) FC United of Manchester	Free transfer	
18 October 2019	DM	(Republic of Ireland)	Chris McCann	(United States) D.C. United	Free transfer	
29 November 2019	CM	(England)	David Jones	(England) Sheffield Wednesday	Free transfer	
30 November 2019	CF	(France)	Jean-Louis Akpa Akpro	(United Arab Emirates) Masfout Club	Free transfer	
14 January 2020	RW	(England)	Zak Dearnley	(England) New Mills	Free transfer	
16 January 2020	CF	(England)	Danny Rowe	(England) AFC Fylde	Undisclosed	

=== Loans in ===
Date	Position	Nationality	Name	From	Date until	Ref.
5 July 2019	GK	(Slovenia)	Gregor Zabret	(Wales) Swansea City	30 June 2020	
2 August 2019	LB	(England)	Ashley Smith-Brown	(England) Plymouth Argyle	31 January 2020	
2 September 2019	RW	(Portugal)	Filipe Morais	(England) Crawley Town	30 June 2020	
2 September 2019	LM	(England)	Jonny Smith	(England) Bristol City	30 June 2020	
2 January 2020	MF	(England)	Christian N'Guessan	(England) Burnley	30 June 2020	
6 January 2020	CB	(England)	Carl Piergianni	(England) Salford City	30 June 2020	
10 January 2020	CF	(England)	Emmanuel Dieseruvwe	(England) Salford City	30 June 2020	
24 January 2020	LB	(England)	Cameron Borthwick-Jackson	(England) Manchester United	30 June 2020	

=== Loans out ===
Date	Position	Nationality	Name	To	Date until	Ref.
16 August 2019	LM	(Northern Ireland)	Harry Robinson	(Northern Ireland) Crusaders	7 January 2020	
16 August 2019	MF	(England)	Kyle Wych	(England) Glossop North End	September 2019	
29 August 2019	RB	(England)	Javid Swaby-Neavin	(England) Radcliffe	30 June 2020	
30 August 2019	AM	(England)	Callum Dolan	(England) Ashton United	October 2019	
19 September 2019	LW	(Curaçao)	Gevaro Nepomuceno	(England) Chesterfield	1 January 2020	
12 October 2019	MF	(France)	Florian Gonzales	(England) Ashton United	1 January 2020	
22 November 2019	MF	(England)	Reece Gaskell	(England) Runcorn Linnets	December 2019	
22 November 2019	MF	(England)	Lewis McKinney	(England) Runcorn Linnets	December 2019	
29 November 2019	DF	(England)	Andy Hackett	(England) Winsford United	January 2020	
29 November 2019	DF	(England)	Charley Leech	(England) Winsford United	January 2020	
29 November 2019	FW	(England)	Ryan Pickford	(England) Winsford United	January 2020	
17 January 2020	CF	(England)	Kielen Adams	(England) Chorley	February 2020	
28 February 2020	CF	(England)	Scott Wilson	(England) Notts County	31 May 2020	
1 March 2020	CF	(England)	Kielen Adams	(England) Hyde United	April 2020	

=== Transfers out ===
Date	Position	Nationality	Name	To	Fee	Ref.
1 July 2019	AM	(England)	Jose Baxter	(England) Plymouth Argyle	Released	
1 July 2019	CB	(England)	Peter Clarke	(England) Fleetwood Town	Released	
1 July 2019	CB	(England)	George Edmundson	(Scotland) Rangers	Undisclosed	
1 July 2019	AM	(England)	Dan Gardner	Free agent	Released	
1 July 2019	RB	(England)	Rob Hunt	(England) Swindon Town	Mutual consent	
1 July 2019	LB	(England)	Jay Sheridan	Free agent	Released	
1 July 2019	LB	(England)	Andy Taylor	(England) AFC Fylde	Released	
1 July 2019	CM	(England)	Chinedu Uche	(England) Glossop North End	Released	
2 September 2019	CF	(England)	Chris O'Grady	(England) Bolton Wanderers	Mutual consent	
11 October 2019	AM	(England)	Callum Dolan	Free agent	Sacked	
18 October 2019	CF	(Belgium)	Jonathan Benteke	(Germany) Alemannia Aachen	Free transfer	
3 December 2019	DM	(France)	Ousmane Fané	(England) Shrewsbury Town	Free transfer	
6 January 2020	RW	(England)	Chris Eagles	Free agent	Mutual consent	
8 January 2020	MF	(France)	Florian Gonzales	Free agent	Mutual consent	
10 January 2020	CF	(France)	Jean-Louis Akpa Akpro	(England) Radcliffe	Mutual consent	
24 January 2020	CF	(Spain)	Urko Vera	(Spain) CD Guijuelo	Mutual consent	
30 January 2020	CM	(England)	David Jones	Free agent	Released	
3 February 2020	LM	(Northern Ireland)	Harry Robinson	(Scotland) Motherwell	Released	
3 February 2020	CB	(Martinique)	Sonhy Sefil	Free agent	Released	

== Pre-season ==
The Latics announced pre-season friendlies against Raja Casablanca and Rochdale.

14 July 2019 Friendly	Raja Casablanca	v	Oldham Athletic	Agadir, Morocco
TBC WEST				Stadium: Stade Adrar

20 July 2019 Friendly	Oldham Athletic	2–3	Rochdale	Oldham
15:00 BST	Maouche 27'; Hamer 32'	Report	Done 7'; Keohane 12'; Henderson 83'	Stadium: Boundary Park; Attendance: 1,778

23 July 2019 Friendly	Ashton United	2–2	Oldham Athletic	Ashton-under-Lyne
19:30 BST	Dolan 11'; Crowther 60'	Report	Trialist 76', 86'	Stadium: Hurst Cross

27 July 2019 Friendly	Oldham Athletic	0–2	Stockport County	Oldham
15:00 BST		Report	Palmer 5'; Walker 44'	Stadium: Boundary Park; Attendance: 1,227

== Competitions ==
=== League Two ===
==== League table ====
Pos	Team	Pld	W	D	L	GF	GA	GD	Pts	PPG	Promotion, qualification or relegation
15	Grimsby Town	37	12	11	14	45	51	−6	47	1.27	
16	Cambridge United	37	12	9	16	40	48	−8	45	1.22	
17	Leyton Orient	36	10	12	14	47	55	−8	42	1.17	
18	Carlisle United	37	10	12	15	39	56	−17	42	1.14	
19	Oldham Athletic	37	9	14	14	44	57	−13	41	1.11	
20	Scunthorpe United	37	10	10	17	44	56	−12	40	1.08	
21	Mansfield Town	36	9	11	16	48	55	−7	38	1.06	
22	Morecambe	37	7	11	19	35	60	−25	32	0.86	
23	Stevenage	36	3	13	20	24	50	−26	22	0.61	Reprieved from relegation (Note: As a result of Bury's expulsion from League One, only one team is relegated to maintain League Two at 24 teams.)

Source: EFL Official Website
Rules for classification: 1) Points per game; 2) Goal difference; 3) Number of goals scored; 4) Head-to-head results; 5) Wins; 6) Away goals; 7) Penalty points (sec 9.5); 8) 12-point sending off offences

==== Results summary ====
Overall								Home						Away					
Pld	W	D	L	GF	GA	GD	Pts	W	D	L	GF	GA	GD	W	D	L	GF	GA	GD
37	9	14	14	44	57	−13	41	6	7	5	28	21	+7	3	7	9	16	36	−20

Last updated: 7 March 2020.
Source: BBC

==== Results by matchday ====
Matchday	1	2	3	4	5	6	7	8	9	10	11	12	13	14	15	16	17	18	19	20	21	22	23	24	25	26	27	28	29	30	31	32	33	34	35	36	37
Ground	A	H	A	H	A	H	A	H	A	H	A	H	A	H	H	A	H	A	H	A	H	A	H	H	A	A	A	H	A	H	H	A	A	H	A	H	A
Result	L	L	L	D	W	L	D	D	D	W	L	D	L	L	W	D	D	W	D	L	W	W	L	L	L	D	D	D	D	W	W	L	L	D	D	W	L
Position	20	22	24	23	22	22	22	20	21	19	19	21	21	21	20	19	20	20	21	22	19	17	18	20	20	20	18	18	20	17	14	17	19	18	19	17	18

Updated to match(es) played on 7 March 2020. Source: Statto.com
A = Away; H = Home; W = Win; D = Draw; L = Loss

==== Matches ====
On Thursday, 20 June 2019, the EFL League Two fixtures were revealed.

3 August 2019 1	Forest Green Rovers	1–0	Oldham Athletic	Nailsworth
15:00 BST	Mills (yellow card) 42'; Allen 72'	Report	Maouche (yellow card) 35'; Wheater (yellow card) 54'	Stadium: The New Lawn; Attendance: 2,541; Referee: Neil Hair

10 August 2019 2	Oldham Athletic	1–2	Crewe Alexandra	Oldham
15:00 BST	Missilou 2'; Haymer (yellow card) 37'; Wilson (yellow card) 63'	Report	Porter 22', 41' (pen.); Dale (yellow card) 90+2'	Stadium: Boundary Park; Attendance: 3,884; Referee: Carl Boyeson

17 August 2019 3	Bradford City	3–0	Oldham Athletic	Bradford
15:00 BST	Vaughan 4'; Donaldson 32'; Scannell 72'; Akpan (yellow card) 90+1'	Report	Smith-Brown (yellow card) 42'	Stadium: Valley Parade; Attendance: 14,447; Referee: Geoff Eltringham

20 August 2019 4	Oldham Athletic	0–0	Exeter City	Oldham
19:45 BST	Smith-Brown (yellow card) 3'; Iacovitti (yellow card) 62'	Report		Stadium: Boundary Park; Attendance: 2,805; Referee: Graham Salisbury

24 August 2019 5	Cambridge United	1–2	Oldham Athletic	Cambridge
15:00 BST	Richards 35'	Report	Vera 28'; Wheater 67'; Fage (yellow card) 73'; Sylla (yellow card) 78'; Maouche (yellow card) 88'; Hamer (yellow card) 90+1'	Stadium: Abbey Stadium; Attendance: 4,004; Referee: Scott Oldham

31 August 2019 6	Oldham Athletic	0–1	Colchester United	Oldham
15:00 BST	Wilson (yellow card) 34'; Azankpo (yellow card) 85'	Report	Clampin (yellow card) 40'; Nouble 45'; Prosser (yellow card) 58'	Stadium: Boundary Park; Attendance: 3,091; Referee: Joshua Smith

7 September 2019 7	Plymouth Argyle	2–2	Oldham Athletic	Plymouth
15:00 BST	Riley (yellow card) 26'; Wootton 31' (yellow card) 70'; Grant (yellow card) 51'; Mayor (yellow card) 61'; Moore 74'	Report	Branger 27'; Maouche (yellow card) 39'; Sylla (yellow card) 45+4'; Iacovitti (yellow card) 77'; Wheater 77'; Morais (yellow card) 84'; Mills (yellow card) 90+5'	Stadium: Home Park; Attendance: 9,061; Referee: Will Finnie

14 September 2019 8	Oldham Athletic	2–2	Grimsby Town	Oldham
15:00 BST	Missilou 19'; Morais 66'; Sylla (yellow card) 84'	Report	Ogbu (yellow card) 46'; Hendrie (yellow card) 61'; Hewitt (yellow card) 69'; Cook 81'; Vernam (yellow card) 89'; Öhman 90'	Stadium: Boundary Park; Attendance: 3,789; Referee: Sam Purkiss

17 September 2019 9	Scunthorpe United	2–2	Oldham Athletic	Scunthorpe
19:45 BST	Lund (yellow card) 10' (goal) 68'; Songo'o (yellow card) 40' van Veen 77' (yellow card) 78'; Proctor (yellow card) 90+4'; Brown (yellow card) 90+5'	Report	Branger (yellow card) 56' (goal) 64'; Missilou 62' (yellow card) 71'; Fage (yellow card) 79'; Morais (yellow card) 86'; Mills (yellow card) 90+8'	Stadium: Sands Venue Stadium; Attendance: 3,020; Referee: Martin Coy

21 September 2019 10	Oldham Athletic	3–1	Morecambe	Oldham
15:00 BST	Maouche 33'; Segbé Azankpo 51'; Smith 89'	Report	Miller 78'	Stadium: Boundary Park; Attendance: 3,305; Referee: Leigh Doughty

28 September 2019 11	Carlisle United	1–0	Oldham Athletic	Carlisle
15:00 BST	Olomola 3'	Report	Missilou (yellow card) 41'	Stadium: Brunton Park; Attendance: 4,321; Referee: Marc Edwards

5 October 2019 12	Oldham Athletic	1–1	Cheltenham Town	Oldham
15:00 BST	Morais 9'; Maouche (yellow card) 24'; Hamer (yellow card) 59'; Sylla (yellow card) 82'	Report	Hussey (yellow card) 41'; Broom (yellow card) 66' (goal) 71'; Addai (yellow card) 86'; Greaves (yellow card) 89'	Stadium: Boundary Park; Attendance: 3,496; Referee: Alan Young

12 October 2019 13	Mansfield Town	6–1	Oldham Athletic	Mansfield
15:00 BST	Maynard 31', 34', 45+4'; Wheater 56' (o.g.); Pearce (yellow card) 65'; Afolayan 66'; Knowles 83' (pen.); Sweeney (yellow card) 90+2'	Report	Morais (yellow card) 33' (yellow-red card) 38'; Egert (red card) 37'; Hamer 43'	Stadium: One Call Stadium; Attendance: 4,368; Referee: Lee Swabey

19 October 2019 14	Oldham Athletic	0–1	Macclesfield Town	Oldham
15:00 BST	Maouche (yellow card) 40'; Azankpo (yellow card) 45+4'; Sylla (yellow card) 58'; McCann (yellow card) 67'	Report	Harris (yellow card) 53'; McCourt 86'	Stadium: Boundary Park; Attendance: 4,428; Referee: Anthony Backhouse

22 October 2019 15	Oldham Athletic	2–0	Walsall	Oldham
19:45 BST	Wilson 55'; Azankpo 69'; Iacovitti (yellow card) 80'	Report	Sadler (red card) 52'	Stadium: Boundary Park; Attendance: 2,438; Referee: Oliver Yates

26 October 2019 16	Port Vale	0–0	Oldham Athletic	Burslem
15:00 BST	Taylor (yellow card) 20'; Joyce (yellow card) 75'	Report		Stadium: Vale Park; Attendance: 4,301; Referee: Rob Lewis

2 November 2019 17	Oldham Athletic	2–2	Northampton Town	Oldham
15:00 GMT	Wilson 85'; Smith 89'	Report	Warburton 6'; Anderson (yellow card) 41'; Wharton (yellow card) 59'; Williams 80'	Stadium: Boundary Park; Attendance: 3,274; Referee: Peter Wright

16 November 2019	Stevenage	v	Oldham Athletic	Stevenage
15:00 GMT		Report		Stadium: The Lamex Stadium
Note: On 11 November, the match was postponed due to international call ups.

23 November 2019 18	Newport County	0–1	Oldham Athletic	Newport
15:00 GMT	Abrahams (yellow card) 60'; Labadie (yellow card) 61'; Inniss (yellow card) 89'; Bennett (yellow card) 90+4'	Report	Mills 45+1'; Morais (yellow card) 70'	Stadium: Rodney Parade; Attendance: 3,748; Referee: Craig Hicks

7 December 2019 19	Oldham Athletic	1–1	Leyton Orient	Oldham
15:00 GMT	Smith 2'; McCann (yellow card) 44'; Wheater (yellow card) 85'; Maouche (yellow card) 90+1'	Report	Maguire-Drew 25'; Widdowson (yellow card) 46'; Happe (yellow card) 75'; Marsh (yellow card) 87'	Stadium: Boundary Park; Attendance: 3,121; Referee: Alan Young

14 December 2019 20	Swindon Town	2–0	Oldham Athletic	Swindon
15:00 GMT	Woolery 45+1'; Baudry (yellow card) 66'; Doyle 85'	Report	Iacovitti (yellow card) 32'; Mills (yellow card) 90+4'	Stadium: County Ground; Attendance: 6,825; Referee: David Rock

21 December 2019 21	Oldham Athletic	2–1	Crawley Town	Oldham
15:00 GMT	Wheater 49'; Maouche 58'	Report	Young 17'	Stadium: Boundary Park; Attendance: 2,737; Referee: Martin Coy

26 December 2019 22	Morecambe	1–2	Oldham Athletic	Morecambe
15:00 GMT	Mendes Gomes 47'	Report	Segbé Azankpo 30'; Sylla 75'; McCann (yellow card) 90+6'	Stadium: Globe Arena; Attendance: 2,797; Referee: Anthony Backhouse

29 December 2019 23	Oldham Athletic	1–4	Salford City	Oldham
15:00 GMT	Fage (yellow card) 25'; Morais (penalty missed) 53'; Segbe Azankpo 58'	Report	Jervis 15', 36'; Thomas-Asante 16', 48'; Threlkeld (yellow card) 52'	Stadium: Boundary Park; Attendance: 5,278; Referee: Darren Handley

1 January 2020 24	Oldham Athletic	0–2	Scunthorpe United	Oldham
15:00 GMT		Report	Eisa 35'; Lund 83'	Stadium: Boundary Park; Attendance: 2,972; Referee: Graham Salisbury

4 January 2020 25	Cheltenham Town	3–0	Oldham Athletic	Cheltenham
15:00 GMT	Sheaf 32'; May 76'; Broom 90+5'	Report	Mills (yellow card) 53'	Stadium: Jonny-Rocks Stadium; Attendance: 3,029; Referee: Brett Huxtable

11 January 2020 26	Macclesfield Town	1–1	Oldham Athletic	Macclesfield
15:00 GMT	Kirby (yellow card) 23'; Ironside 90+1' (pen.)	Report	Missilou (yellow card) 22'; Smith 85'; Wheater (red card) 90'	Stadium: Moss Rose; Attendance: 2,205; Referee: Peter Wright

14 January 2020 27	Stevenage	0–0	Oldham Athletic	Stevenage
19:45 GMT	Stokes (yellow card) 79'	Report	Mills (yellow card) 31'; Jones (yellow card) 39'; Wheater (yellow card) 53'	Stadium: The Lamex Stadium; Attendance: 2,156; Referee: Kevin Johnson

18 January 2020 28	Oldham Athletic	1–1	Carlisle United	Oldham
15:00 GMT	Segbé Azankpo (yellow card) 22'; Smith 42'	Report	Webster 25'; Hayden (yellow card) 52'	Stadium: Boundary Park; Attendance: 3,977; Referee: Rob Lewis

25 January 2020 29	Salford City	1–1	Oldham Athletic	Salford
15:00 GMT	Rooney (penalty missed) 15'; Thomas-Asante 16'; Baldwin (yellow card) 59'	Report	Mills (yellow card) 15'; Maouche (yellow card) 16'; Rowe 83'; Nepomuceno (yellow card) 90'	Stadium: The Peninsula Stadium; Attendance: 3,646; Referee: Josh Smith

28 January 2020 30	Oldham Athletic	3–1	Mansfield Town	Oldham
19:45 GMT	Smith 23'; Hamer 43'; Nepomuceno 58'	Report	Riley (yellow card) 16'; Pearce (yellow card) 70'; Khan 90+3'	Stadium: Boundary Park; Attendance: 2,961; Referee: Michael Salisbury

1 February 2020 31	Oldham Athletic	3–0	Bradford City	Oldham
15:30 GMT	Dearnley 11'; Smith 20'; Maouche 46'; Borthwick-Jackson (yellow card) 50'; Piergianni (yellow card) 78'	Report	O'Connor (yellow card) 38'; McCartan (yellow card) 52'; Richards-Everton (yellow card) 79'	Stadium: Boundary Park; Attendance: 5,198; Referee: Ben Toner
Note: Kick-off was delayed by 30 minutes due to an unsafe advertising hoarding.

8 February 2020 32	Crewe Alexandra	2–1	Oldham Athletic	Crewe
15:00 GMT	Jones 55'; Kirk 90+6' (yellow card) 90+7'	Report	Smith 48' (yellow card) 54'; Nepomuceno (yellow card) 86'	Stadium: Alexandra Stadium; Attendance: 5,271; Referee: Sam Purkiss

11 February 2020 33	Exeter City	5–1	Oldham Athletic	Exeter
19:45 GMT	Richardson 20'; Martin (yellow card) 26'; Jay 43' (pen.); Collins 51'; Bowman 61'; Dickenson 90+3'	Report	Wheater 23' (red card) 42'; McCann (yellow card) 90+2'	Stadium: St James Park; Attendance: 3,527; Referee: Keith Stroud

15 February 2020 34	Oldham Athletic	1–1	Forest Green Rovers	Oldham
15:00 GMT	Nepomuceno 56'; Missilou (yellow card) 70'	Report	Williams 88'	Stadium: Boundary Park; Attendance: 2,720; Referee: Marc Edwards

22 February 2020 35	Leyton Orient	2–2	Oldham Athletic	Leyton
15:00 GMT	Hamer 13' (o.g.); Happe (yellow card) 31'; Johnson 54'	Report	Mills (yellow card) 8'; Dearnley 15', 18'; Hamer (yellow card) 45+4'; McCann (yellow card) 58'	Stadium: Breyer Group Stadium; Attendance: 5,334; Referee: James Oldham

29 February 2020 36	Oldham Athletic	5–0	Newport County	Oldham
15:00 GMT	Rowe 25', 52'; Dearnley 27'; Hamer 62'; Smith 83'	Report	Demetriou (yellow card) 55'	Stadium: Boundary Park; Attendance: 2,912; Referee: Thomas Bramall

7 March 2020 37	Crawley Town	3–0	Oldham Athletic	Crawley
15:00 GMT	German 36'; Ferguson (yellow card) 49'; Nadesan 70'; Lubala 76' (pen.); Dacres-Cogley (yellow card) 85'	Report		Stadium: The People's Pension Stadium; Attendance: 2,037; Referee: Charles Breakspear

14 March 2020	Oldham Athletic	v	Swindon Town	Oldham
15:00 GMT				Stadium: Boundary Park
Note: Season was suspended until 3 April 2020, due to the COVID-19 pandemic.

17 March 2020	Walsall	v	Oldham Athletic	Bescot
19:45 GMT				Stadium: Banks's Stadium
Note: Season was suspended until 3 April 2020, due to the COVID-19 pandemic.

21 March 2020	Oldham Athletic	v	Port Vale	Oldham
15:00 GMT				Stadium: Boundary Park
Note: Season was suspended until 3 April 2020, due to the COVID-19 pandemic.

28 March 2020	Northampton Town	v	Oldham Athletic	Northampton
15:00 GMT				Stadium: PTS Academy Stadium
Note: Season was suspended until 3 April 2020, due to the COVID-19 pandemic.

4 April 2020	Oldham Athletic	v	Stevenage	Oldham
15:00 BST				Stadium: Boundary Park
Note: On 3 April, the English Football League decided to postpone all football until safe to do so due to the COVID-19 pandemic.

10 April 2020	Oldham Athletic	v	Cambridge United	Oldham
15:00 BST				Stadium: Boundary Park
Note: On 3 April, the English Football League decided to postpone all football until safe to do so due to the COVID-19 pandemic.

13 April 2020	Colchester United	v	Oldham Athletic	Colchester
13:00 BST				Stadium: JobServe Community Stadium
Note: On 3 April, the English Football League decided to postpone all football until safe to do so due to the COVID-19 pandemic.

18 April 2020	Oldham Athletic	v	Plymouth Argyle	Oldham
15:00 BST				Stadium: Boundary Park
Note: On 3 April, the English Football League decided to postpone all football until safe to do so due to the COVID-19 pandemic.

25 April 2020	Grimsby Town	v	Oldham Athletic	Cleethorpes
15:00 BST				Stadium: Blundell Park
Note: On 3 April, the English Football League decided to postpone all football until safe to do so due to the COVID-19 pandemic.

=== FA Cup ===
The first round draw was made on 21 October 2019. The second round draw was made live on 11 November from Chichester City's stadium, Oaklands Park.

10 November 2019 First round	Gateshead	1–2	Oldham Athletic	Gateshead
12:45 GMT	Agnew 53'	Report	Morais 28'; McCann (yellow card) 58'; Egert (yellow card) 70'; Smith 77'; Iacovitti (yellow card) 79'	Stadium: Gateshead International Stadium; Attendance: 2,199; Referee: Josh Smith

30 November 2019 Second round	Oldham Athletic	0–1	Burton Albion	Oldham
15:00 GMT	Iacovitti (yellow card) 31'; Maouche (yellow card) 84'; Akpa Akpro (yellow card) 90+2'	Report	Sbarra (yellow card) 15'; Boyce 23'; O'Hara (yellow card) 81'	Stadium: Boundary Park; Referee: Andy Davies

=== EFL Cup ===
The first round draw was made on 20 June.

13 August 2019 First round	Blackburn Rovers	3–2	Oldham Athletic	Blackburn
19:45 BST	Dack 70'; Cunningham (yellow card) 90'; Downing 90+2'; Rothwell 90+5'	Report	Nepomuceno 14'; Maouche (yellow card) 41', (goal) 80'; Smith-Brown (yellow card) 70'	Stadium: Ewood Park; Attendance: 5,215; Referee: Tom Nield

=== EFL Trophy ===
On 9 July 2019, the pre-determined group stage draw was announced with Invited clubs to be drawn on 12 July 2019.

Pos	Div	Team	Pld	W	PW	PL	L	GF	GA	GD	Pts	Qualification
1	L1	Accrington Stanley	3	3	0	0	0	10	3	+7	9	Advance to Round 2
2	L1	Fleetwood Town	3	1	1	0	1	7	5	+2	5	Advance to Round 2
3	L2	Oldham Athletic	3	1	0	0	2	5	10	−5	3	
4	ACA	Liverpool U21	3	0	0	1	2	5	9	−4	1	

Source: EFL.com

7 August 2019 Group stage	Oldham Athletic	3–2	Liverpool U21	Oldham
19:00 BST	Segbé Azankpo 20'; Iacovitti 29'; Fage (yellow card) 60'; Stott 81'	Report	Williams 4'; Boyes (yellow card) 28'; Christie-Davies (yellow card) 35'; Elliott 44'	Stadium: Boundary Park; Attendance: 1,522; Referee: Paul Marsden

8 October 2019 Group stage	Oldham Athletic	0–3	Accrington Stanley	Oldham
19:45 BST	Adams (yellow card) 22'; Fage (red card) 45+2'; Egert (yellow card) 75'	Report	Diallo 30' (yellow card) 47'; Zanzala 42' (pen.); Barclay (yellow card) 70'; Clark 86'	Stadium: Boundary Park; Attendance: 1,107; Referee: Ben Toner

13 November 2019 Group stage	Fleetwood Town	5–2	Oldham Athletic	Fleetwood
19:45 GMT	Clarke 9'; Morris 11'; Sowerby 14'; Burns 40'; Madden 51'	Report	Smith 25'; Azankpo 78'	Stadium: Highbury Stadium; Attendance: 535; Referee: Andy Haines
