= Ethan McLeod =

English footballer (2004–2025)

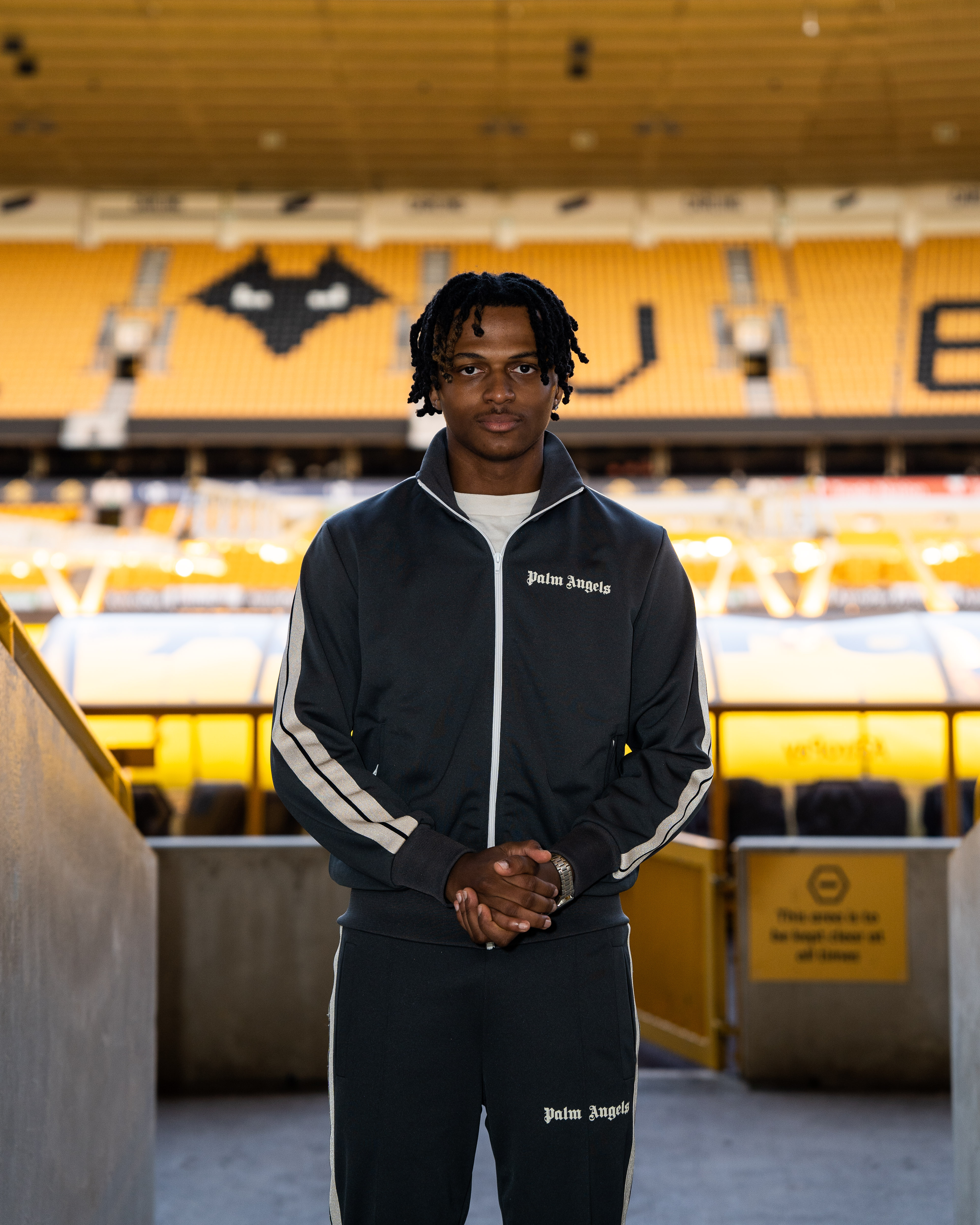
- McLeod with Wolves in 2023

Personal information
- Full name: Ethan Lucius McLeod
- Date of birth: 11 September 2004
- Place of birth: Birmingham, England
- Date of death: 16 December 2025 (aged 21)
- Place of death: Northamptonshire, England
- Positions: Forward; midfielder

Youth career
- 2014–2024: Wolverhampton Wanderers

Senior career*
Years	Team	Apps	(Gls)
2023–2024	Wolverhampton Wanderers	0	(0)
2024	→ Alvechurch (loan)	7	(0)
2024	Rushall Olympic	1	(0)
2024–2025	Stourbridge	13	(4)
2025	Macclesfield	3	(1)
Total		24	(5)
- * Club domestic league appearances and goals

Ethan Lucius McLeod (11 September 2004 – 16 December 2025) was an English professional footballer who played as a forward. He last played for Macclesfield in the National League North.

== Career ==
=== Wolverhampton Wanderers ===
McLeod joined the Wolverhampton Wanderers academy in 2014 at the age of 7. He signed a professional contract with the club in 2023. He made appearances for the club in the Premier League 2 and EFL Trophy. He was also invited to England youth training camps during his time at Wolves.

On 1 January 2024, McLeod joined Southern League side Alvechurch on loan. He played 9 times in total for the club.

Having suffered injury problems towards the end of his Wolves career, he was released by the club in September 2024.

=== Rushall Olympic ===
On 12 October 2024, McLeod signed for National League North side Rushall Olympic on a one-month contract. He left the club at the end of his contract.

=== Stourbridge ===
On 9 November 2024, McLeod joined Southern League club Stourbridge, hoping for more regular game time. He made 14 appearances for the club in the 2024–25 season, scoring 4 goals.

=== Macclesfield ===
On 14th July 2025, McLeod joined National League North side Macclesfield after impressing manager John Rooney as a trialist in their friendly against Mansfield Town.

== Personal life ==
McLeod's brother, Conor, plays for Wolverhampton Wanderers' development squad.

As well as his career in semi-professional football, McLeod also participated in the first season of Baller League UK, playing for YouTuber TBJZL's team VZN FC in Summer 2025 after leaving Stourbridge.

== Death and legacy ==
=== Car accident ===
On 16 December 2025, McLeod was returning home from Macclesfield's game away at Bedford Town when he was involved in a collision on the M1 motorway, crashing into a roadside barrier near Junction 15. Northamptonshire Police later confirmed he died on the scene.

=== Reaction ===
Macclesfield announced the news of his death the next morning. Former clubs Wolverhampton Wanderers, Rushall Olympic and Stourbridge also shared messages of condolences.

On 20 December, a minute's silence was held before Wolves' Premier League match against Brentford in McLeod's memory.

Macclesfield's next match, a home league fixture against Alfreton Town, was postponed. On Boxing Day, they returned to playing, in a match against Buxton dedicated to McLeod.

=== Legacy ===
On 24 December, Macclesfield announced they would be retiring the number 20 shirt, which McLeod wore during his time at the club.

On 15 June 2026, Macclesfield announced the creation of their new youth and development system, the Emerging Talent Group, set up in McLeod's memory.

==== FA Cup upset ====
On 10 January 2026, Macclesfield played in the FA Cup third round at home to Premier League opposition Crystal Palace. This was regarded as the biggest match in the club's history since its revival in 2021. The match was once again dedicated to McLeod, with his portrait hung in the dugout and a banner paying tribute hung in the stands.

Macclesfield won the match 2–1 in what is regarded as the biggest upset in FA Cup history. McLeod's parents celebrated the victory with the players after the game. They were eliminated in the next round in a 1–0 loss against Brentford.

== Career statistics ==
Appearances and goals by club, season and competition
Club	Season	League			FA Cup		League Cup		Other		Total	
Club	Season	Division	Apps	Goals	Apps	Goals	Apps	Goals	Apps	Goals	Apps	Goals
Wolverhampton Wanderers U21	2023–24	—			—		—		2 (Note: Appearances in EFL Trophy)	0	2	0
Wolverhampton Wanderers	2023–24	Premier League	0	0	0	0	0	0	—		0	0
Alvechurch (loan)	2023–24	Southern League Premier Division Central	7	0	0	0	—		2 (Note: Appearances in Worcestershire Senior Cup)	0	9	0
Rushall Olympic	2024–25	National League North	1	0	1	0	—		0	0	2	0
Stourbridge	2024–25	Southern League Premier Division Central	13	4	0	0	—		1 (Note: Appearance in Birmingham Senior Cup)	0	14	4
Macclesfield	2024–25	National League North	3	1	1	1	—		3 (Note: Two appearances and one goal in FA Trophy, one appearance in Cheshire Senior Cup)	1	7	3
Career total			24	5	2	1	0	0	8	1	34	7
