= Dylan Fage =

French footballer (born 1999)

Personal information
- Full name: Dylan Raphaël Colette Fage
- Date of birth: 18 March 1999 (age 27)
- Place of birth: Paris, France
- Height: 1.78 m (5 ft 10 in)
- Position: Midfielder

Senior career*
Years	Team	Apps	(Gls)
2016–2019	Auxerre II	25	(0)
2019–2022	Oldham Athletic	60	(1)
2023	Macclesfield	5	(1)
2023–2024	St Albans City	21	(4)
2024	Worthing	14	(2)
2024	Whitehawk	1	(0)
- * Club domestic league appearances and goals as of 16:26, 26 September 2024 (UTC)

Dylan Raphaël Colette Fage (born 18 March 1999) is a French professional footballer who last played as a midfielder for English club Whitehawk.

== Career ==
Fage was born in Paris.

After playing for Auxerre II, he signed for English club Oldham Athletic in July 2019, with the contract being extended in April 2021. Fage was released following relegation at the end of the 2021–22 season.

On 2 February 2023, Fage signed for Northern Premier League Division One West side Macclesfield.

In July 2023, Fage signed for National League South club St Albans City.

Later that season, in January 2024, Fage signed for fellow National League South club Worthing before joining neighbours Whitehawk in August 2024, only to leave the following month after two appearances.

== Career statistics ==
As of end of 2022–23 season

Club	Season	League			FA Cup		EFL Cup		Other		Total	
Club	Season	Division	Apps	Goals	Apps	Goals	Apps	Goals	Apps	Goals	Apps	Goals
Auxerre II	2016–17	Championnat National 2	1	0	0	0	0	0	0	0	1	0
Auxerre II	2017–18	Championnat National 3	12	0	0	0	0	0	0	0	12	0
Auxerre II	2018–19	Championnat National 3	12	0	0	0	0	0	0	0	12	0
Auxerre II	Total		25	0	0	0	0	0	0	0	25	0
Oldham Athletic	2019–20	League Two	12	0	0	0	1	0	2 (Note: Appearance(s) in the EFL Trophy.)	0	15	0
Oldham Athletic	2020–21	League Two	34	1	2	0	2	0	3	0	41	1
Oldham Athletic	2021–22	League Two	14	0	2	0	3	0	4	0	23	0
Oldham Athletic	Total		60	1	4	0	6	0	9	0	79	1
Macclesfield	2022–23	Northern Premier League Division One West	5	1	0	0	—		0	0	5	1
St Albans City	2023–24	National League South	21	4	0	0	—		1 (Note: Appearance in the FA Trophy.)	1	22	5
Worthing	2023–24	National League South	0	0	0	0	—		0	0	0	0
Career total			111	6	4	0	6	0	10	1	131	7
