= 2021–22 Macclesfield F.C. season =

Macclesfield
2021–22 season
- Owner: Robert Smethurst
- Manager: Danny Whitaker
- Stadium: Leasing.com Stadium
- NWCFL Premier Division: 1st (promoted)
- FA Cup: Preliminary Round
- FA Vase: First Qualifying Round
- NWCFL Challenge Cup: Quarter-final
- Top goalscorer: League: Tom Clare & Neil Danns (21); All: Tom Clare (23)
- Highest home attendance: 4,720 vs. AFC Liverpool, NWCFL Premier Division, (2 April 2022)
- Average home league attendance: 3,390
- Biggest win: 6–0 vs. Vauxhall Motors (A) (22 February 2022); 6–0 vs. Avro (H) (19 March 2022)
Home colours	Away colours

The 2021–22 season was the first in the history of Macclesfield Football Club. Alongside the North West Counties Premier League, they entered the FA Cup, FA Vase, NWCFL Challenge Cup and the Cheshire Senior Cup. The season covers the period from July 2021 to 30 June 2022.

On 12 March 2022, Macclesfield secured the championship and promotion to the NPL Division One following a 4–0 home win over Ashton Athletic.

== Pre-season friendlies ==
28 June 2021	New Mills	2–3	Macclesfield	New Mills
19:45 BST (UTC+01)	Trialist 80'; Trialist 83'	Report	Clare 38'; Crofton 79' 80'	Stadium: Church Lane; Attendance: 377

3 July 2021	Macclesfield	Cancelled	Congleton Town	Macclesfield
15:00 BST (UTC+01)				Stadium: Leasing.com Stadium

6 July 2021	Witton Albion	1–3	Macclesfield	Northwich
19:45 BST (UTC+01)	11'		Maieco 10'; Clare 56'; Crofton 86'	Stadium: Wincham Park

10 July 2021	Macclesfield	2–2	Leek Town	Macclesfield
15:00 BST (UTC+01)	Maieco 48'; Clare 68'	Report	Trickett-Smith 32'; Dickov 60'	Stadium: Leasing.com Stadium

13 July 2021	Winstanley Warriors	1–7	Macclesfield	Wigan
19:00 BST (UTC+01)	6'		Maieco 2'; Mendy 22'; Grimshaw 38'; Dwyer 60' 68' 80'; Owen 90'	Stadium: Little Lane

17 July 2021	Macclesfield	0–0	Stalybridge Celtic	Macclesfield
15:00 BST (UTC+01)				Stadium: Leasing.com Stadium

20 July 2021	Buxton	2–1	Macclesfield	Buxton
19:45 BST (UTC+01)	Chambers 17'; Mills 57'		48' (o.g.)	Stadium: The Silverlands; Attendance: 300

23 July 2021	Macclesfield	0–3	Chester	Macclesfield
19:45 BST (UTC+01)			Cartwright 12' 17'; Waring 46'	Stadium: Leasing.com Stadium

24 July 2021	Macclesfield	1–1	Stockport County	Macclesfield
15:00 BST (UTC+01)	Coker 85'		Alli	Stadium: Leasing.com Stadium

27 July 2021	Macclesfield	0–1	F.C. United of Manchester	Macclesfield
19:45 BST (UTC+01)		Report	Waddecar 46'	Stadium: Leasing.com Stadium

== Competitions ==
=== NWCFL Premier Division ===
==== League table ====
Pos	Team	Pld	W	D	L	GF	GA	GD	Pts	Promotion, qualification or relegation
1	Macclesfield (C, P)	40	29	7	4	94	38	+56	94	Promotion to the NPL Division One West
2	Skelmersdale United (O, P)	40	24	7	9	94	51	+43	79	Qualification for an inter-step play-off (Note: Contested a one-off inter-step play-off match as one of the bottom six runners-up from Step 5 with the most points per game (PPG) against a third-from-bottom club out of six from Step 4 with the fewest PPG. The winner rose to Step 4 for the 2022–23 season, while the loser dropped to Step 5. If a runner-up did not meet the minimum participation criteria, a club in the next eligible position between second and seventh would have played instead.)
3	Wythenshawe Town	40	23	9	8	83	43	+40	78	
4	Charnock Richard	40	24	6	10	106	69	+37	78	
5	Northwich Victoria	40	19	6	15	74	64	+10	63	

Source: NWCFL Tables, Non League Matters
Rules for classification: 1) points; 2) goal difference; 3) number of goals scored; 4) number of matches won; 5) head-to-head results
(C) Champions; (O) Play-off winners; (P) Promoted

==== Results summary ====
Overall								Home						Away					
Pld	W	D	L	GF	GA	GD	Pts	W	D	L	GF	GA	GD	W	D	L	GF	GA	GD
40	29	7	4	94	38	+56	94	18	1	1	54	15	+39	11	6	3	40	23	+17

Last updated: 22 April 2022.
Source: https://www.nwcfl.com/league-tables.php

==== Results by matchday ====
Matchday	1	2	3	4	5	6	7	8	9	10	11	12	13	14	15	16	17	18	19	20	21	22	23	24	25	26	27	28	29	30	31	32	33	34	35	36	37	38	39	40
Ground	H	A	H	H	A	H	A	H	H	A	A	H	H	A	A	H	A	H	A	A	A	H	H	H	A	H	A	A	H	A	H	A	A	A	H	A	H	H	A	H
Result	W	D	W	W	W	W	D	W	W	L	L	W	W	W	D	W	W	D	W	D	W	W	W	W	L	L	W	D	W	D	W	W	W	W	W	W	W	W	W	W

Updated to match(es) played on 2 April 2022. Source: https://www.nwcfl.com/clubpage.php?id=888#tab2
A = Away; H = Home; W = Win; D = Draw; L = Loss

==== Matches ====
Macclesfield's league fixtures for the first half of the season were announced on 2 July 2021. The fixtures for the second half of the season were announced on 28 September 2021.

31 July 2021 1	Macclesfield	1–0	Burscough	Macclesfield
15:00 BST (UTC+01)	Arnasalem 16'; Coker (yellow card); Dwyer (yellow card)		Denson (yellow card); Smith (yellow card)	Stadium: Leasing.com Stadium; Attendance: 2,018

3 August 2021 2	Winsford United	4–4	Macclesfield	Winsford
19:45 BST (UTC+01)	Boden 33'; Bolland 38'; Duckworth 56' 70'; O'Connor (yellow card); Parr (yellow card)		Clare 2' (pen.) 8' 45' 68'; Dwyer (yellow card); Mendy (yellow card); Obeng (yellow card)	Stadium: The Barton Stadium; Attendance: 918

14 August 2021 3	Macclesfield	2–1	Irlam	Macclesfield
15:00 BST (UTC+01)	Dwyer 29'; Clare 49'; Adams (yellow card); Clare (yellow card)		Icely 9'; Langford (yellow card); Skinner (yellow card)	Stadium: Leasing.com Stadium; Attendance: 2,061

17 August 2021 4	Macclesfield	3–1	Prestwich Heys	Macclesfield
19:45 BST (UTC+01)	Dwyer 12'; Mendy 41'; Clare 65'	Report	Grimshaw 45+2'; Dickinson (yellow card); Potts (yellow card) (yellow-red card)	Stadium: Leasing.com Stadium; Attendance: 2,121

28 August 2021 5	Barnoldswick Town	1–2	Macclesfield	Barnoldswick
15:00 BST (UTC+01)	Hill 42'		Clare 19'; Dwyer 25'; Clare (yellow card); Dwyer (yellow card); Fleming (yellow card)	Stadium: Greenberfield Lane; Attendance: 691

30 August 2021 6	Macclesfield	1–0	Congleton Town	Macclesfield
15:00 BST (UTC+01)	Berry 56'; Clare (yellow card); Maieco (yellow card); Mendy (yellow card)		Griffith (yellow card); Needham (yellow card)	Stadium: Leasing.com Stadium; Attendance: 3,502

4 September 2021 7	Ashton Athletic	1–1	Macclesfield	Ashton-in-Makerfield
15:00 BST (UTC+01)	Beckford 82'; Bandell (yellow card); Reid (red card)		Adams 68'; Adams (yellow card)	Stadium: Brocstedes Park; Attendance: 475

14 September 2021 8	Macclesfield	1–0	Vauxhall Motors	Macclesfield
19:45 BST (UTC+01)	Clare 90'; Fleming (yellow card); Morrison (yellow card)		Garner–Knapper (yellow card)	Stadium: Leasing.com Stadium; Attendance: 2,432

18 September 2021 9	Macclesfield	4–0	Litherland REMYCA	Macclesfield
15:00 BST (UTC+01)	Maieco 15' 32'; Morrison 48'; McGowan 58'		Codling (yellow card); Moran (yellow card)	Stadium: Leasing.com Stadium; Attendance: 3,004

20 September 2021 10	Longridge Town	4–2	Macclesfield	Longridge
19:45 BST (UTC+01)	Anderton 20' 77'; Yoak 24'; Wilkinson 34'		Clare 3' 7'; Maieco (yellow card); Morrison (yellow card)	Stadium: Mike Riding Ground; Attendance: 448

29 September 2021 11	Avro	2–0	Macclesfield	Oldham
19:45 BST (UTC+01)	Potts 20'; Rathbone 24'; Cottrell (yellow card); Harrop (yellow card); Latham (yellow card); Sloane (yellow card); Wallwork (yellow card)		Clare (yellow card); Mendy (yellow card)	Stadium: Whitebank Stadium; Attendance: 400

2 October 2021 12	Macclesfield	4–1	Charnock Richard	Macclesfield
15:00 BST (UTC+01)	Adams 9'; Danns 33'; Maieco 47' 68'	Report	Carsley 90'	Stadium: Leasing.com Stadium; Attendance: 2,778

5 October 2021 13	Macclesfield	2–1	Northwich Victoria	Macclesfield
19:45 BST (UTC+01)	Dwyer 64'; Hanson 66'; Maieco (yellow card)	Report	Sephton 31'; Schofield (yellow card)	Stadium: Leasing.com Stadium; Attendance: 3,003

9 October 2021 14	Wythenshawe Town	0–1	Macclesfield	Wythenshawe
15:00 BST (UTC+01)			Dwyer 18'; Morrison (yellow card)	Stadium: Ericstan Stadium; Attendance: 894

16 October 2021 15	Squires Gate	0–0	Macclesfield	Squires Gate
15:00 BST (UTC+01)	Boyd (yellow card); Ridings (yellow card)	Report		Stadium: The Brian Addison Stadium; Attendance: 408

23 October 2021 16	Macclesfield	3–0	Padiham	Macclesfield
15:00 BST (UTC+01)	Clare 61' (pen.) 90'; Berry 90+4'; Bardsley–Rowe (yellow card); Clare (yellow card)		D. Sherlock (red card); K. Sherlock (yellow card); Walker (yellow card)	Stadium: Leasing.com Stadium; Attendance: 3,221

29 October 2021 17	Lower Breck	1–3	Macclesfield	Anfield
20:00 BST (UTC+01)	McGivern 86'; Brown (yellow card); Morris (yellow card); Peers (yellow card)		Danns 30' 53'; Adams 84'; Ashton (yellow card) (yellow-red card)	Stadium: Anfield Sports and Community Centre; Attendance: 563

6 November 2021 18	Macclesfield	2–2	Runcorn Town	Macclesfield
15:00 GMT	Danns 59' 90+5' (pen.); Simpson (yellow card)		Cairns 68'; Foulkes 80' (pen.); Antoine (yellow card); Davies (yellow card); Lloyd (yellow card)	Stadium: Leasing.com Stadium; Attendance: 3,420

9 November 2021 19	AFC Liverpool	1–2	Macclesfield	Crosby
19:45 GMT	McCarthy 90+2'; Parr (yellow card); Thomas (yellow card)		Danns 21' (pen.); Mendy 78'; Morrison (yellow card)	Stadium: Rossett Park; Attendance: 413

13 November 2021 20	Skelmersdale United	0–0	Macclesfield	Skelmersdale
15:00 GMT	Nicholson (yellow card)	Report	Maieco (yellow card); Simpson (yellow card)	Stadium: JMO Sports Park; Attendance: 936

27 November 2021 21	Northwich Victoria	3–4	Macclesfield	Northwich
15:00 GMT	Dunn 40' 90+3'; Birchall 46'; Birchall (yellow card); Mather (yellow card)		Danns 38' 77' 80'; Berry 90+2'; Clare (yellow card); Danns (yellow card); Danquah (yellow card); Mendy (yellow card)	Stadium: Wincham Park; Attendance: 942

4 December 2021 22	Macclesfield	2–0	Barnoldswick Town	Macclesfield
15:00 GMT	Berry 36'; Clare 45'	Report	Fagan (yellow card)	Stadium: Leasing.com Stadium; Attendance: 3,502

11 December 2021 23	Macclesfield	1–0	Squires Gate	Macclesfield
15:00 GMT	Bardsley–Rowe 18'; Clare (yellow card); Maieco (yellow card); Mendy (yellow card)			Stadium: Leasing.com Stadium; Attendance: 3,392

18 December 2021 Match postponed	Prestwich Heys	P–P	Macclesfield	Prestwich
15:00 GMT				Stadium: Adie Moran Park

27 December 2021 24	Macclesfield	2–1	Winsford United	Macclesfield
15:00 GMT	Danns 54'; Clare 75'; Clare (yellow card)		Coughlan 6'; Jackson (yellow card); McDonough (yellow card)	Stadium: Leasing.com Stadium; Attendance: 4,353

3 January 2022 25	Prestwich Heys	1–0	Macclesfield	Prestwich
14:00 GMT	Rothwell 6'; Dickin (yellow card)		Clare (yellow card)	Stadium: Adie Moran Park; Attendance: 420

8 January 2022 26	Macclesfield	2–4	Wythenshawe Town	Macclesfield
15:00 GMT	Berry 18'; 49' (o.g.); Berry (yellow card); Clare (yellow card)	Report	Bryan 22'; Smalley 57'; Palma 74'; Byrne 77'; Wilkinson (yellow card)	Stadium: Leasing.com Stadium; Attendance: 3,543

14 January 2022 27	Litherland REMYCA	1–2	Macclesfield	Bootle
19:45 GMT	Riley 37'; Clair (yellow card); Clements (yellow card); Murphy (yellow card)	Report	Danns 27'; Lee 29'; Lee (yellow card); Lonsdale (yellow card); Maieco (yellow card)	Stadium: Berry Street Garage Stadium; Attendance: 643

22 January 2022 28	Charnock Richard	1–1	Macclesfield	Charnock Richard
15:00 GMT	Darr 88'; Jakovlevs (yellow card); Nickeas (yellow card); Regan (yellow card)	Report	Danns 59'; Berry (yellow card); Hanson (yellow card)	Stadium: Mossie Park; Attendance: 641

29 January 2022 29	Macclesfield	3–1	Skelmersdale United	Macclesfield
15:00 GMT	Berry 45+2'; Danns 67'; Lonsdale 88'	Report	Morris 28'; Morris (yellow card); Nicholson (yellow card); Preston (yellow card)	Stadium: Leasing.com Stadium; Attendance: 4,347

5 February 2022 Match postponed	Padiham	P–P	Macclesfield	Padiham
15:00 GMT				Stadium: Arbories Memorial Sports Ground

8 February 2022 30	Irlam	2–2	Macclesfield	Irlam
19:45 GMT	Brown 35'; Southworth 55'; Cartwright (yellow card); Francis (red card); Holt (yellow card); Icely (yellow card)		Danns 50' (pen.); Berry 61'; Hanson (yellow card); Fensome (yellow card); Sonogo (yellow card)	Stadium: Silver Street; Attendance: 915

12 February 2022 31	Macclesfield	4–0	Lower Breck	Macclesfield
15:00 GMT	Danns 64'; Berry 76'; Clare 77'; Dwyer 90+3'; Berry (yellow card); Duffy (yellow card); Mendy (yellow card)	Report	Finley (yellow card); Miller (yellow card)	Stadium: Leasing.com Stadium; Attendance: 3,745

19 February 2022 32	Burscough	0–4	Macclesfield	Burscough
15:00 GMT	Brady (yellow card); McNamara (yellow card)	Report	Danns 42' 64'; Berry 72'; Owens 77'; Clare (yellow card)	Stadium: New Victoria Park; Attendance: 375

22 February 2022 33	Vauxhall Motors	0–6	Macclesfield	Ellesmere Port
19:45 GMT	Heath (yellow card)	Report	Clare 16'; Danns 21' 33'; Berry 42' 43'; Adams 83'	Stadium: vanEupen Arena; Attendance: 576

26 February 2022 34	Runcorn Town	0–1	Macclesfield	Runcorn
15:00 GMT	Davies (yellow card); Hughes (yellow card); Turner (yellow card)	Report	28' (o.g.); Sanogo (yellow card)	Stadium: Viridor Community Stadium; Attendance: 635

5 March 2022 35	Macclesfield	3–1	Longridge Town	Macclesfield
15:00 GMT	Clare 1'; Freedman 37'; Adams 89'	Report	Anderton 54'; Flynn (yellow card); Forbes (yellow card); Martin (yellow card); Turner (yellow card)	Stadium: Leasing.com Stadium; Attendance: 4,002

8 March 2022 36	Padiham	0–2	Macclesfield	Padiham
19:45 GMT	Hoskin (red card); Morton (yellow card)		Clare 61'; Danns 77'	Stadium: Arbories Memorial Sports Ground; Attendance: 625

12 March 2022 37	Macclesfield	4–0	Ashton Athletic	Macclesfield
15:00 GMT	Danns 45+1'; Berry 48' 90'; Clare 64'; Freedman (yellow card)	Report	Houghton (yellow card)	Stadium: Leasing.com Stadium; Attendance: 4,604

19 March 2022 38	Macclesfield	6–0	Avro	Macclesfield
15:00 GMT	Berry 29' 42+2' 84' (pen.) 90+2'; West 68'; Kiwomya 90+6'; West (yellow card)	Report		Stadium: Leasing.com Stadium; Attendance: 4,038

26 March 2022 39	Congleton Town	1–3	Macclesfield	Crewe
15:00 GMT	Chadwick 4' (pen.); Putnam (yellow card); Read (yellow card)	Report	Berry 14'; Mendy 61' 77'; Freedman (yellow card); Mendy (yellow card)	Stadium: Gresty Road; Attendance: 1,668

2 April 2022 40	Macclesfield	4–2	AFC Liverpool	Macclesfield
15:00 BST (UTC+01)	44' (o.g.); Clare 45+2' (pen.) 69'; Duffy 77'	Report	Fisher 62'; Scorah 79'; Croasdale (yellow card); Lyons (yellow card)	Stadium: Leasing.com Stadium; Attendance: 4,720

=== FA Cup ===
Macclesfield were drawn at home to Burscough in the extra preliminary round and away to Squires Gate in the preliminary round.

7 August 2021 Extra Preliminary Round	Macclesfield	4–0	Burscough	Macclesfield
15:00 BST (UTC+01)	Clare 3'; Dwyer 20' 30'; Coker 45'; Ajayi (yellow card); Berry (yellow card); Clare (yellow card)	Report		Stadium: Leasing.com Stadium; Attendance: 1,334

21 August 2021 Preliminary Round	Squires Gate	6–4	Macclesfield	Squires Gate
15:00 BST (UTC+01)	Feeney 15'; Westwood 21'; Ing 62' 67'; Boyd 73'; Iley 82'; Bartram–Conway (yellow card); Ing (yellow card)	Report	Dwyer 3' 39'; Adams 49'; 73' (o.g.); Sekouba (yellow card)	Stadium: The Brian Addison Stadium; Attendance: 738

=== FA Vase ===
Macclesfield were drawn away to Winterton Rangers in the first qualifying round.

11 September 2021 First Qualifying Round	Winterton Rangers	3–2	Macclesfield	Winterton
15:00 BST (UTC+01)	Ture 7'; Walker 16'; Allison 65'		Adams 17'; McGowan 36'; Clare (yellow card); Coker (yellow card)	Stadium: West Street Stadium; Attendance: 363

=== NWCFL Challenge Cup ===
Macclesfield were drawn away to Skelmersdale United in the quarter-final, the match was later switched to the Leasing.com Stadium at Skelmersdale's request.

16 March 2022 First Round	Northwich Victoria	1–2	Macclesfield	Northwich
19:45 GMT	Birchall 78'	Report	Maieco 53' 64'; McDonnell (yellow card)	Stadium: Wincham Park; Attendance: 231

29 March 2022 Second Round	Macclesfield	2–1	Sandbach United	Macclesfield
19:45 BST (UTC+01)	Berry 4'; Freedman 35' (pen.)	Report	Evans 84'; Roberts (yellow card); Tatters (yellow card)	Stadium: Leasing.com Stadium; Attendance: 693

12 April 2022 Third Round	Macclesfield	4–1	Brocton	Macclesfield
19:45 BST (UTC+01)	Berry 11' 17'; Dwyer 13'; Clare 75'; Berry (yellow card)	Report	Smith 46'; Blanchette (yellow card); Devoir (yellow card); Rolston (yellow card)	Stadium: Leasing.com Stadium; Attendance: 530

2 May 2022 Quarter-final	Macclesfield	2–3	Skelmersdale United	Macclesfield
15:00 BST (UTC+01)	Berry 29'; Danns (penalty missed) 45+2'; Danns 45+2'		Salkeld 22'; Croughan 39'; Howard 90'	Stadium: Leasing.com Stadium; Attendance: 1,148

=== Cheshire Senior Cup ===
2 November 2021 First Round	Macclesfield	3–2	Cheadle Heath Nomads	Macclesfield
19:45 GMT	Ryan 19'; Grimshaw 62'; McGowan 79'		Foley 68' 86'; Evans (yellow card)	Stadium: Leasing.com Stadium; Attendance: 402

7 December 2021 Second Round	Macclesfield	1–3	Stockport County	Macclesfield
19:45 GMT	Rokka 25' (pen.); Rokka (yellow card)	Report	Jennings 22'; Alli 45'; Edwards 66'	Stadium: Leasing.com Stadium; Attendance: 1,054

Last updated: 23 April 2022.
Source: https://www.nwcfl.com/clubpage.php?id=888
