= Danny Elliott (footballer) =

English footballer (born 1995)

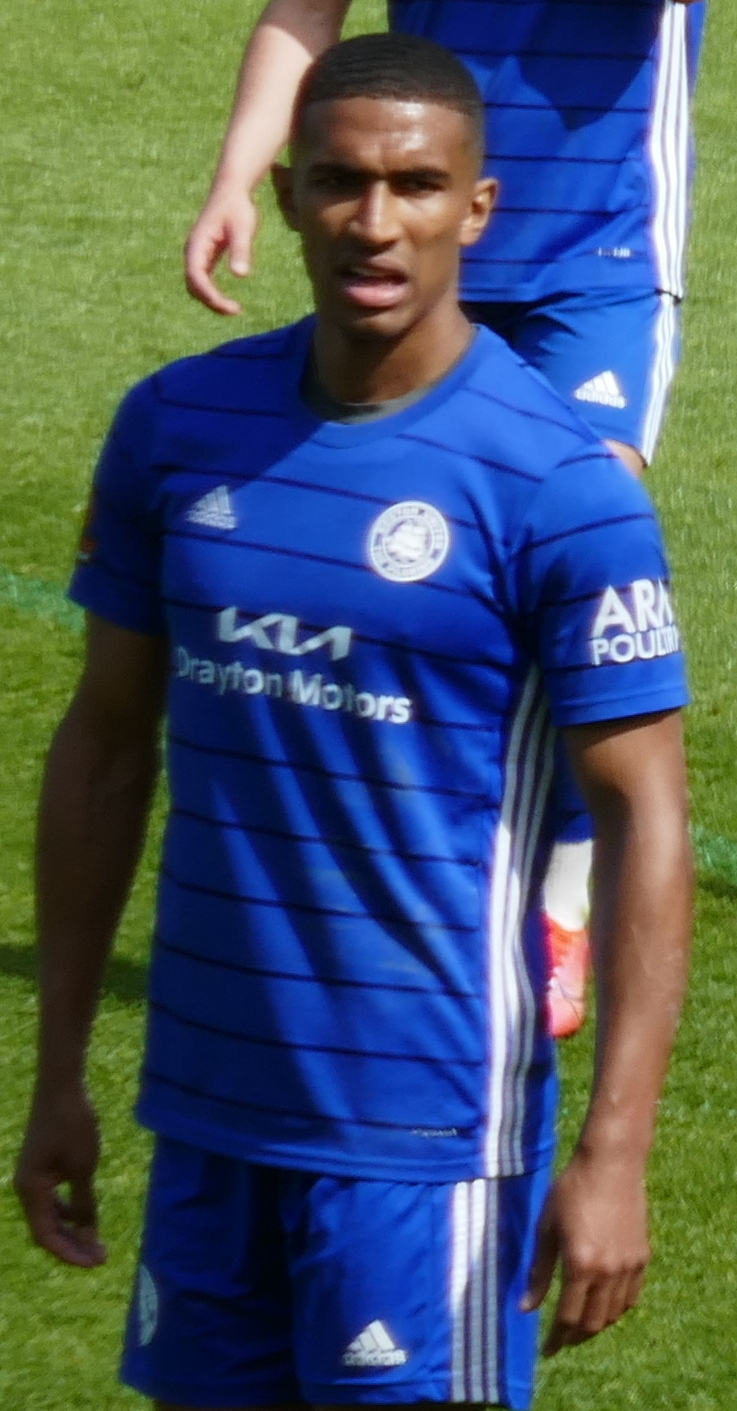
- Elliott playing for Boston United in 2022

Personal information
- Date of birth: 29 September 1995 (age 31)
- Place of birth: Nottingham, England
- Height: 6 ft 0 in (1.83 m)
- Position: Forward

Team information
- Current team: Macclesfield

Youth career
- Nottingham Forest
- Aston Villa

College career
Years	Team	Apps	(Gls)
2014–2017	Hofstra Pride	68	(14)

Senior career*
Years	Team	Apps	(Gls)
2018	North Carolina FC U23	0	(0)
2018	Long Island Rough Riders	6	(1)
2018–2019	San Cristóbal	9	(2)
2019	Port Vale	6	(0)
2019–2021	Chester	35	(10)
2020	→ Alfreton Town (loan)	5	(5)
2021	Hartlepool United	5	(1)
2021–2022	Boston United	41	(19)
2022–2023	Boreham Wood	16	(2)
2022–2023	→ Gateshead (loan)	7	(5)
2023–2024	Scunthorpe United	54	(13)
2024–	Macclesfield	74	(53)
- * Club domestic league appearances and goals as of 19:55, 31 October 2026 (UTC)

Daniel John E. S. Elliott (born 29 September 1995) is an English professional footballer who plays as a forward for National League North club Macclesfield.

A former youth team player at Nottingham Forest and Aston Villa, Elliott played college soccer in the United States with Hofstra Pride and later represented North Carolina FC U23 and the Long Island Rough Riders. He joined Spanish club San Cristóbal in October 2018 and then signed with English Football League side Port Vale in January 2019. Released by Port Vale in May 2019, he signed with Chester two months later. He was loaned out to Alfreton Town in January 2020. He signed with Hartlepool United in April 2021. He helped the club to win promotion out of the National League via the play-offs two months later. He remained in non-League; however, he signed with National League North side Boston United in July 2021. He was named Boston's Player of the Year for the 2021–22 season. At the end of the season, Elliott turned down a new contract with Boston and moved up a division to sign for Boreham Wood. He was loaned out to Gateshead in December 2022 and transferred to Scunthorpe United two months later. He joined Macclesfield in June 2024 and scored 41 goals in the 2024–25 campaign as the club won the Northern Premier League Premier Division title.

== Early and personal life ==
Born in Nottingham, Elliott attended West Bridgford School. He earned a BA in economics from Hofstra University in May 2018.

== Career ==
=== Early career ===
Elliott began his career with the youth teams of Aston Villa and Nottingham Forest, where he received a two-year scholarship before moving on to collegiate soccer in New York America.

He played college soccer for the Hofstra Pride between 2014 and 2017. He also spent time with North Carolina FC U23, and the Long Island Rough Riders. He made his PDL debut for the Rough Riders on 24 June 2018, in a 1–0 defeat at Reading United. He made a further five appearances, scoring one goal in 3–2 victory over Evergreen at the Hofstra University Soccer Stadium.

=== Port Vale ===
He signed for Spanish Tercera División club San Cristóbal in October 2018. He left the club in January 2019 to trial with English League Two club Port Vale. The trial was successful and later that month he signed for Port Vale until the end of the 2018–19 season. He made his debut in the English Football League on 19 January, coming on for Ricky Miller as a 75th-minute substitute in a 1–0 win at Crawley Town. After the match, Port Vale manager Neil Aspin said that "Danny is a gamble. We have put him on today but if we had more strikers he wouldn't be thrown in the deep end". After three months playing reserve team football, he returned to the first-team to impress new manager John Askey as a substitute against Stevenage on 19 April. However, Askey confirmed that he would not be offering Elliott a new contract on 16 May.

=== Chester ===
Elliott joined National League North club Chester on a one-year deal in July 2019, following a successful trial spell in which he scored against Wigan Athletic in a pre-season friendly at the Deva Stadium. He moved on loan to league rivals Alfreton Town in January 2020. He scored a hat-trick on his debut for the "Reds" in a 6–1 victory over Gloucester City at North Street on 28 January. He ended the loan spell with five goals from five games and was put back into the first-team following his return to the Deva Stadium. He scored three goals in 21 appearances for Chester in the 2019–20 season, which was permanently suspended on 26 March due to the COVID-19 pandemic in England, with Chester in the play-offs in seventh place. They were knocked out of the play-offs with a 3–1 loss at Altrincham. He scored eight goals in 22 games before the 2020–21 season was also curtailed due to the COVID-19 pandemic. On 12 April 2021, it was announced that Elliott had left Chester.

=== Hartlepool United ===
On 14 April 2021, Elliott signed a contract with National League club Hartlepool United until the end of the season. Elliott made his debut for Hartlepool as a substitute in a 7–2 victory at Wealdstone. Elliott scored his first goal for Hartlepool in a 4–2 defeat to Maidenhead United on 8 May. Hartlepool reached the final of the play-offs against Torquay United at Ashton Gate (stadium), with Elliott featuring as a 72nd-minute substitute for Rhys Oates; promotion to the Football League was secured with a penalty shoot-out victory, during which Elliott scored his penalty. He was released by Hartlepool at the end of the 2020–21 season.

=== Boston United ===
On 14 July 2021, Elliott joined National League side Boston United and scored in his first appearance in a Boston shirt as the "Pilgrims" beat Lincoln United in the Lincolnshire Senior Cup. He scored 27 goals from 48 appearances throughout the 2021–22 season, his 19 league goals making him the division's fifth highest scorer and helping Boston to qualify for the play-offs. Elliott won the Fans and Players of the Year at the club's end-of-season awards. He scored three goals in the play-offs, helping Boston to advance past Kidderminster Harriers and AFC Fylde, though they were denied promotion after losing 2–0 to York City in the final. At the end of the season, Elliott was named in the National League North Team of the Year.

=== Boreham Wood ===
After turning down a new contract with Boston, Elliott signed for National League side Boreham Wood on 1 July 2022. He scored two goals in his first 15 starts for the club. On 3 December 2022, Elliott signed on loan for National League rivals Gateshead until the end of the 2022–23 season. He won Gateshead's Player of the Month award for December. After six goals in nine games in all competitions for Gateshead, Elliott was recalled by Boreham Wood on 31 January 2023. Wood manager Luke Garrard explained that "we always had an agreement that he needed to go out and get game time, confidence and goals, and he has definitely stuck to his side of the bargain".

=== Scunthorpe United ===
On 6 February 2023, Elliott transferred to National League side Scunthorpe United for an undisclosed fee. He said that his aim was to score the goals needed to steer the club out of the relegation zone. He scored two goals in 15 games as Scunthorpe were relegated at the end of the 2022–23 season. He scored 12 goals in 44 games in the 2023–24 season, including an appearance in the play-off-semi-final defeat to Boston United. Along with Ross Fitzsimons, he was a joint-winner of the club's 'Study Parks Special Accolade' for his "support and commitment to projects". Having rejected the offer of new terms, it was announced in May 2024 that he would depart the club upon the expiration of his contract.

=== Macclesfield ===
On 18 June 2024, Elliott agreed to join Northern Premier League Premier Division side Macclesfield. He scored hat-tricks in wins over Hyde United and Lancaster City. He scored 41 goals in 50 matches throughout the 2024–25 season as Macclesfield won promotion as league champions. Following the conclusion of the season, he was named as the Premier Division's Player of the Year. He praised manager Robbie Savage whilst picking up the award.

On 1 November 2025, he scored a hat-trick in a 6–3 win over AFC Totton at Moss Rose to send John Rooney's side into the second round of the FA Cup. He missed the second half of the 2025–26 season after sustaining an injury during the Macclesfield's Boxing Day defeat to Buxton.

== Career statistics ==
As of match played 31 October 2026

Appearances and goals by club, season and competition
Club	Season	League			National cup (Note: Includes U.S. Open Cup, Copa del Rey, FA Cup)		League cup (Note: Includes EFL Cup)		Other		Total	
Club	Season	Division	Apps	Goals	Apps	Goals	Apps	Goals	Apps	Goals	Apps	Goals
North Carolina FC U23	2018	PDL	0	0	0	0	0	0	0	0	0	0
Long Island Rough Riders	2018	PDL	6	1	0	0	0	0	0	0	6	1
San Cristóbal	2018–19	Tercera División	9	2	0	0	0	0	0	0	9	2
Port Vale	2018–19	League Two	6	0	0	0	0	0	1 (Note: Appearance in EFL Trophy)	0	7	0
Chester	2019–20	National League North	18	3	1	0	—		7 (Note: Three appearances in FA Trophy, three appearances and six goals in Cheshire Senior Cup, one appearance in National League North play-offs)	6	26	9
Chester	2020–21	National League North	17	7	3	1	—		2 (Note: Appearance(s) in FA Trophy)	0	22	8
Chester	Total		35	10	4	1	—		9	6	48	17
Alfreton Town (loan)	2019–20	National League North	5	5	—		—		0	0	5	5
Hartlepool United	2020–21	National League	5	1	—		—		2 (Note: Appearances in National League play-offs)	0	7	1
Boston United	2021–22	National League North	41	19	4	4	—		6 (Note: Three appearances and four goals in FA Trophy, three appearances and three goals in National League North play-offs)	7	51	30
Boreham Wood	2022–23	National League	16	2	2	1	—		0	0	18	3
Gateshead (loan)	2022–23	National League	7	5	—		—		2	1	9	6
Scunthorpe United	2022–23	National League	15	2	—		—		0	0	15	2
Scunthorpe United	2023–24	National League North	39	11	2	1	—		3 (Note: Two appearances in FA Trophy, one appearance in National League North play-offs)	0	44	12
Scunthorpe United	Total		54	13	2	1	—		3	0	59	14
Macclesfield	2024–25	Northern Premier League; Premier Division	42	35	4	3	—		4	3	50	41
Macclesfield	2025–26	National League North	20	11	2	4	—		0	0	22	15
Macclesfield	2026–27	National League North	12	7	5	5	—		0	0	17	12
Macclesfield	Total		74	53	11	12	0	0	4	3	89	68
Career total			258	111	23	19	0	0	27	17	308	147

== Honours ==
Hartlepool United

- National League play-offs: 2021

Macclesfield

- Northern Premier League Premier Division: 2024–25

Individual

- Northern Premier League Premier Division Player of the Season: 2024–25
- Boston United Players' Player of the Year: 2021–22
- Boston United Fans' Player of the Year: 2021–22
