= Jonny Smith (footballer) =

English footballer (born 1997)

Personal information
- Full name: Jonathan Gary Smith
- Date of birth: 28 July 1997 (age 29)
- Place of birth: Liverpool, England
- Height: 5 ft 10 in (1.78 m)
- Position: Winger

Team information
- Current team: Rochdale
- Number: 18

Youth career
- 2007–2016: Wrexham

Senior career*
Years	Team	Apps	(Gls)
2016	Wrexham	1	(0)
2016–2021	Bristol City	0	(0)
2016–2017	→ Cheltenham Town (loan)	5	(0)
2017–2018	→ AFC Fylde (loan)	44	(9)
2018–2019	→ Tranmere Rovers (loan)	35	(4)
2019–2020	→ Oldham Athletic (loan)	28	(9)
2020–2021	→ Swindon Town (loan)	16	(1)
2021–2023	Burton Albion	77	(9)
2023–2026	Wigan Athletic	46	(6)
2025–2026	→ Gillingham (loan)	9	(1)
2026–	Rochdale	0	(0)
- * Club domestic league appearances and goals as of 21 July 2026

Jonathan Gary Smith (born 28 July 1997) is an English professional footballer who plays as a winger for EFL League Two club Rochdale.

== Career ==
Born in Liverpool, England, Smith joined the Wrexham academy at the age of 10. On 16 January 2016, Smith made his Wrexham debut in their FA Trophy second round defeat against Torquay United.

In May 2016, Smith signed for Championship side Bristol City for an "undisclosed" compensation fee, agreeing terms on a two-year contract. On 19 August 2016, Smith joined League Two side Cheltenham Town on loan until January 2017. Smith made his English Football League debut the following day in a 1–0 defeat against Doncaster Rovers. He made nine appearances whilst on loan at Cheltenham Town. He moved on loan to Tranmere Rovers in July 2018, and signed a new one-year contract at Bristol City to take him to June 2020. He joined Oldham Athletic on a season-long loan in September 2019. On 29 August 2020, Smith joined Swindon Town on a season-long loan. He scored on his Swindon debut in an EFL Cup tie against Charlton Athletic on 5 September 2020 before being recalled on 29 January having made 20 appearances in all competitions.

On 29 January 2021, Smith joined League One side Burton Albion on a two-and-a-half-year deal for an undisclosed fee. On 6 February 2021, he made his debut in a EFL League One match against Hull City scoring the only goal in a 1–0 win. His contract ended in the summer of 2023 having played 77 league matches scoring 9 goals.

On 30 June 2023, he was announced as a Wigan Athletic player, signing a two-year deal from a free transfer.

On 1 September 2025, Smith joined League Two club Gillingham on a season-long loan from Wigan Athletic.

On 6 May 2026, Wigan announced they had transfer listed the player.

On 4 August 2026, Smith joined newly-promoted League Two club Rochdale, signing a two-year deal.

== Career statistics ==
As of match played 2 April 2021

Appearances and goals by club, season and competition
Club	Season	League			FA Cup		EFL Cup		Other		Total	
Club	Season	Division	Apps	Goals	Apps	Goals	Apps	Goals	Apps	Goals	Apps	Goals
Wrexham	2015–16	National League	1	0	0	0	—		2 (Note: Appearances in the FA Trophy)	0	3	0
Bristol City	2016–17	Championship	0	0	0	0	0	0	—		0	0
Bristol City	2017–18	Championship	0	0	0	0	0	0	—		0	0
Bristol City	2018–19	Championship	0	0	0	0	0	0	—		0	0
Bristol City	2019–20	Championship	0	0	0	0	0	0	—		0	0
Bristol City	2020–21	Championship	0	0	0	0	0	0	—		0	0
Bristol City	Total		0	0	0	0	0	0	—		0	0
Cheltenham Town (loan)	2016–17	League Two	5	0	1	0	1	0	2 (Note: Appearances in the EFL Trophy)	0	9	0
AFC Fylde (loan)	2017–18	National League	44	9	4	1	—		2 (Note: One appearance in FA Trophy, one appearance in National League play-offs)	0	50	10
Tranmere Rovers (loan)	2018–19	League Two	35	4	2	1	1	0	2 (Note: One appearance in EFL Trophy, one appearance in League Two play-offs)	0	40	5
Oldham Athletic (loan)	2019–20	League Two	28	9	2	1	0	0	2	1	32	11
Swindon Town (loan)	2020–21	League One	16	1	0	0	1	1	3	0	20	2
Burton Albion	2020–21	League One	13	2	0	0	0	0	0	0	13	2
Career total			142	25	9	3	3	1	13			
