= Mohamed Sylla (footballer, born 1993) =

French footballer

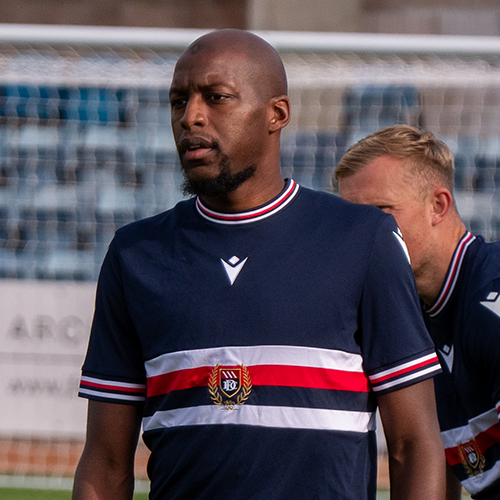
- Sylla in 2024

Personal information
- Date of birth: 1 December 1993 (age 32)
- Place of birth: Paris, France
- Height: 1.88 m (6 ft 2 in)
- Position: Midfielder

Team information
- Current team: Valletta

Senior career*
Years	Team	Apps	(Gls)
2013–2019	L'Entente SSG	110	(6)
2019–2020	Oldham Athletic	45	(1)
2020–2021	Laval	20	(1)
2021–2022	Aldershot Town	30	(2)
2022–2023	Hartlepool United	35	(1)
2023–2025	Dundee	57	(0)
2025–2026	Livingston	32	(1)
2026–	Valletta	0	(0)
- * Club domestic league appearances and goals as of 20 May 2026

Mohamed Sylla (born 1 December 1993) is a French professional footballer who plays for Valletta. He has previously played for L'Entente SSG, Oldham Athletic, Stade Lavallois, Aldershot Town, Hartlepool United and Dundee.

== Career ==
Born in Paris, Sylla began his career with L'Entente SSG, where he made over 100 appearances before signing with English club Oldham Athletic in January 2019. He made his debut on 12 January 2019, in a League match against Forest Green Rovers. He returned to France in June 2020 to sign for Laval.

On 30 October 2021, Sylla joined National League side Aldershot Town, and went onto score on his debut later that day, during a 2–1 away defeat to Barnet. In the 2021–22 season, Sylla made 32 appearances in all competitions for Aldershot, scoring twice. Additionally, he also won the club's player of the year award.

On 4 August 2022, Sylla signed a one-year deal at League Two club Hartlepool United. On 1 January 2023, he scored his first goal for Hartlepool in a 3–3 draw with Harrogate Town. He was dropped from the matchday squad for wins against Grimsby Town and Barrow with manager John Askey claiming that Sylla was not in the right frame of mind to play. It was later reported by the Hartlepool Mail that it was believed Sylla refused to play in the game against Grimsby. Following the win against Barrow which had left Hartlepool relegated, Askey said that several players had been dropped due to their attitude. Despite this, Sylla's contract option was exercised to keep him at the club for a further year, although he failed to return to pre-season training with club.

On 25 August 2023, Sylla joined Scottish Premiership club Dundee on a two-year deal for an undisclosed fee. He made his debut two days later off the bench in a league win over Heart of Midlothian. On 28 September, Sylla collapsed during half-time of a league game against Aberdeen due to having an apparent anaphylactic shock and was taken to hospital where he became responsive and was released in the following days. He made the starting line-up of the following game, but was sent off in the first half due to a controversial second yellow card. On 17 June 2025, Dundee confirmed that Sylla had left the club following the expiration of his contract. Later that month he signed for Livingston.

He left Livingston in May 2026 after activating a relegation release clause.

Sylla signed for Maltese club Valletta in September 2026.

== Personal life ==
Sylla and his partner became parents in November 2024, with their son being born in Paris. After being present for the birth, Sylla returned to Scotland the following day to play the entirety of a comeback victory for Dundee against Kilmarnock which manager Tony Docherty and the team dedicated to Sylla's newborn son.

== Career statistics ==
As of 9 May 2026

Appearances and goals by club, season and competition
Club	Season	League			National cup		League cup		Other		Total	
Club	Season	Division	Apps	Goals	Apps	Goals	Apps	Goals	Apps	Goals	Apps	Goals
L'Entente SSG	2013–14	CFA2 Group A	1	0	0	0	—		—		1	0
L'Entente SSG	2014–15	CFA2 Group A	20	0	0	0	—		—		20	0
L'Entente SSG	2015–16	CFA2 Group A	24	3	2	0	—		—		26	3
L'Entente SSG	2016–17	CFA2 Group B	23	1	0	0	—		—		23	1
L'Entente SSG	2017–18	Championnat National	28	1	2	0	—		—		30	1
L'Entente SSG	2018–19	Championnat National	14	1	1	0	—		—		15	1
L'Entente SSG	Total		110	6	5	0	—		—		115	6
Oldham Athletic	2018–19	League Two	15	0	1	0	—		—		16	0
Oldham Athletic	2019–20	League Two	30	1	1	0	1	0	3 (Note: Appearance(s) in the EFL Trophy)	0	35	1
Oldham Athletic	Total		45	1	2	0	1	0	3	0	51	1
Laval	2020–21	Championnat National	20	1	0	0	—		—		20	1
Aldershot Town	2021–22	National League	30	2	0	0	—		2 (Note: Appearance(s) in the FA Trophy)	0	32	2
Hartlepool United	2022–23	League Two	35	1	4	0	1	0	2	0	42	1
Dundee	2023–24	Scottish Premiership	24	0	1	0	0	0	0	0	25	0
Dundee	2024–25	Scottish Premiership	33	0	3	0	6	0	0	0	42	0
Dundee	Total		57	0	4	0	6	0	0	0	67	0
Livingston	2025–26	Scottish Premiership	31	1	0	0	5	0	0	0	36	1
Career total			327	12	15	0	13	0	7	0	362	12

== Honours ==
Individual

- Entente SSG Supporters' Player of the Year: 2017–18
- Aldershot Town Supporters' Player of the Year: 2021–22
