= Yassin Maouche =

French footballer (born 1997)

Personal information
- Date of birth: 23 July 1997 (age 29)
- Place of birth: Ambilly, France
- Height: 1.84 m (6 ft 1/2 in)
- Position: Midfielder

Youth career
- Servette

Senior career*
Years	Team	Apps	(Gls)
2015–2017	Servette U21	3	(1)
2016–2017	Servette	37	(1)
2017–2019	Zürich	5	(0)
2017–2020	Zürich U21	26	(1)
2021–2023	Schaffhausen	38	(2)
2024–2026	Étoile Carouge	35	(1)
- * Club domestic league appearances and goals as of 26 May 2026

Yassin Maouche (born 23 July 1997) is a French footballer who plays as a midfielder.

== Professional career ==
After a promising debut season with Servette in the Swiss Challenge League, Maouche signed his first professional contract with Zürich on 6 July 2017. Maouche made his professional debut with FCZ in a 2–0 Swiss Super League win over Sion on 10 August 2017.

On 1 February 2019, Maouche was relegated to the U-21 squad, which plays in the third-tier Swiss Promotion League.

On 16 February 2021, he signed with Schaffhausen.

== Personal life ==
Maouche was born in France to Algerian parents. He acquired French nationality on 6 January 2003, through the collective effect of his parents' naturalization. His brother Mohamed Maouche is also a professional footballer.
