= Mohamed Maouche =

French footballer (born 1993)

Personal information
- Full name: Mohamed-Labib Maouche
- Date of birth: 10 January 1993 (age 33)
- Place of birth: Ambilly, France
- Height: 1.80 m (5 ft 11 in)
- Position: Midfielder

Team information
- Current team: Thonon Évian
- Number: 8

Youth career
- Saint-Étienne

Senior career*
Years	Team	Apps	(Gls)
2010–2011	Saint-Étienne B	2	(0)
2011–2014	Servette		
2014–2015	Lausanne-Sport	16	(1)
2015–2017	Tours	57	(3)
2016	→ Tours B	2	(1)
2017–2020	Oldham Athletic	66	(7)
2021	Ross County	0	(0)
2024–	Thonon Évian	2	(1)
- * Club domestic league appearances and goals as of 19:43, 24 September 2024 (UTC)

Mohamed-Labib Maouche (born 10 January 1993) is a French footballer who plays as a midfielder for Thonon Évian.

== Career ==
Maouche signed for Oldham Athletic in September 2017. He signed a new contract in July 2019. He was released by Oldham Athletic at the end of the 2019–20 season.

On 8 January 2021, Maouche signed for Scottish side Ross County on a short-term deal until the end of the season. He was released from County at the end of the season without making a single appearance for the club.

In August 2024, after three years without club, Maouche signed with newly relegated Championnat National 3 side Thonon Évian.

== Personal life ==
Maouche holds both French and Algerian nationalities. He was born in France to Algerian parents, and acquired French nationality on 6 January 2003, through the collective effect of his parents' naturalization. His brother Yassin Maouche is also a professional footballer.

== Career statistics ==
=== Club ===
As of 1 April 2021

Appearances and goals by club, season and competition
Club	Season	League			Cup		League Cup		Other		Total	
Club	Season	Division	Apps	Goals	Apps	Goals	Apps	Goals	Apps	Goals	Apps	Goals
Oldham Athletic	2017–18	EFL League One	1	0	0	0	0	0	3 (Note: Appearances in EFL Trophy)	0	4	0
Oldham Athletic	2018–19	EFL League Two	34	4	3	0	0	0	4	1	41	5
Oldham Athletic	2019–20	EFL League Two	31	3	2	0	1	1	1	0	35	4
Oldham Athletic	Total		66	7	5	0	1	1	8	1	80	9
Ross County	2020–21	Scottish Premiership	0	0	0	0	0	0	0	0	0	0
Career total			66	7	5	0	1	1	8	1	80	9
