= Kielen Adams =

English footballer

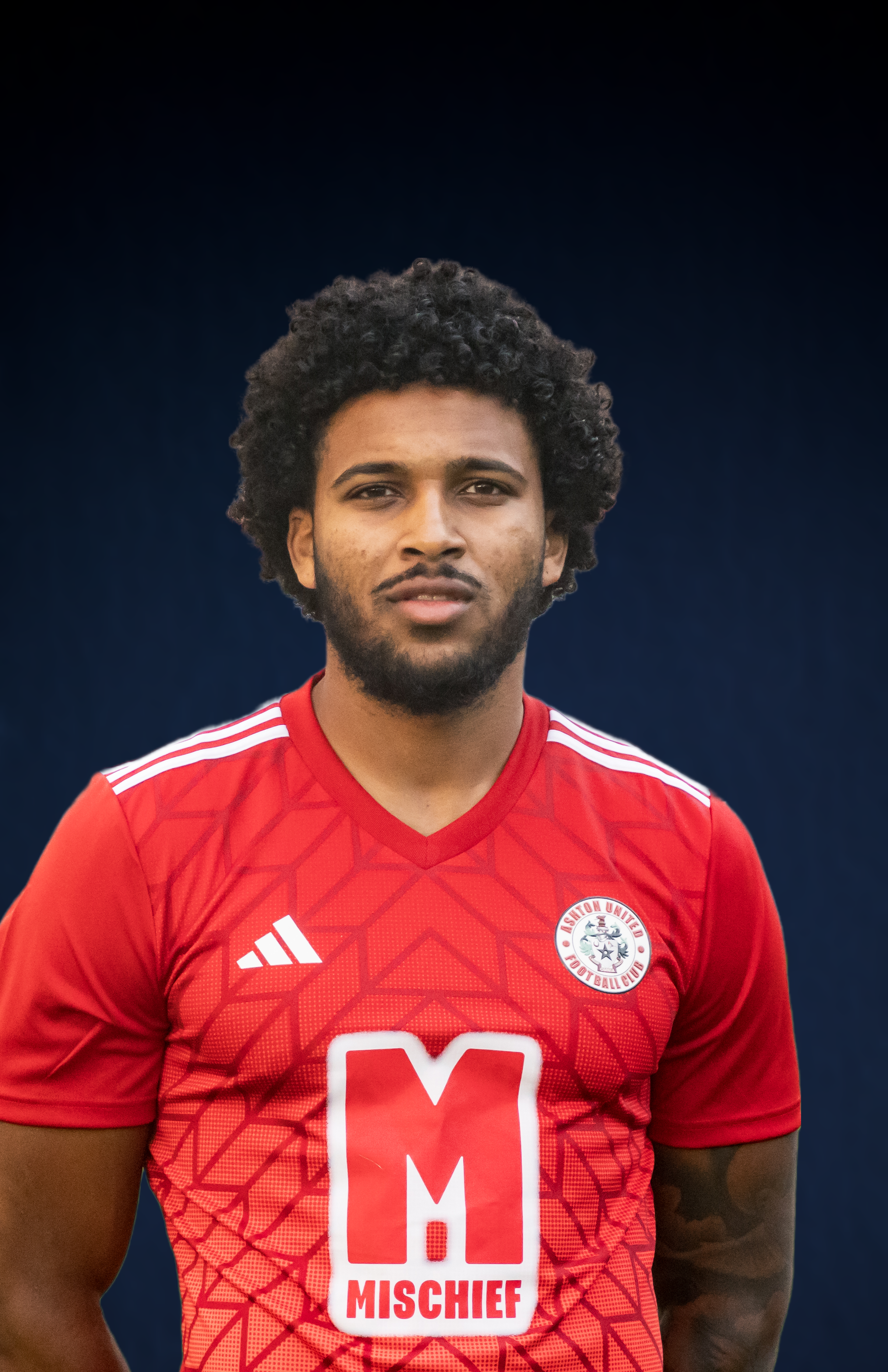
- Adams with Ashton United.

Personal information
- Full name: Kielen Marcel Adams
- Date of birth: 11 May 2001 (age 25)
- Place of birth: Huddersfield, England
- Position: Striker

Team information
- Current team: Atherton Collieries

Youth career
- 2013–2017: Oldham Athletic
- 2017–2019: Bradford City

Senior career*
Years	Team	Apps	(Gls)
2019–2020	Oldham Athletic	1	(0)
2020	→ Chorley (loan)	0	(0)
2020	→ Hyde United (loan)	2	(0)
2020–2021	Clitheroe	9	(3)
2021–2022	Macclesfield	26	(7)
2022	Marine	16	(2)
2022	→ Ashton United (loan)		
2022–2024	Ashton United		
2024	Macclesfield	0	(0)
2024	Emley	2	(0)
2024–	Atherton Collieries	5	(2)
- * Club domestic league appearances and goals as of 21:43, 7 November 2024 (UTC)

Kielen Marcel Adams (born 11 May 2001) is an English semi-professional footballer who plays as a striker for Atherton Collieries.

== Early life ==
Adams was born in Huddersfield.

== Career ==
After playing youth football for Oldham Athletic and Bradford City, Adams returned to Oldham in July 2019. In January 2020 he joined Chorley on loan. On 2 March 2020, he joined Hyde United on a one-month loan. He was released by Oldham at the end of the 2019–20 season.

On 4 September 2020, Adams signed for Clitheroe after playing for the club as a trialist. He extended his contract with the club in January 2021.

In August 2021, he signed for Macclesfield.

Adams joined Marine in March 2022, the first time since 1995 that the club had paid a transfer fee for a player. The undisclosed transfer fee was the highest that Macclesfield had received for a player. He moved on loan to Ashton United in November 2022, before the transfer was made permanent in December.

He returned to Macclesfield in July 2024. He left the club in September 2024, next playing for Emley, before signing for Atherton Collieries in October 2024. He scored his first goals for the club on 2 November 2024, scoring twice in a 4–3 defeat.

== Career statistics ==
As of match played 30 April 2022

Appearances and goals by club, season and competition
Club	Season	League			FA Cup		League Cup		Other		Total	
Club	Season	Division	Apps	Goals	Apps	Goals	Apps	Goals	Apps	Goals	Apps	Goals
Oldham Athletic	2019–20	League Two	1	0	0	0	0	0	2 (Note: Appearances in EFL Trophy)	0	3	0
Chorley (loan)	2019–20	National League North	0	0	—		—		—		0	0
Hyde United (loan)	2019–20	NPL Premier Division	2	0	—		—		—		2	0
Clitheroe	2020–21	NPL Division One North West	9	3	1	0	—		2 (Note: Appearances in FA Trophy)	1	12	4
Macclesfield	2021–22	NWCFL Premier Division	26	7	2	0	—		1 (Note: Appearance in FA Vase)	0	29	7
Marine	2021–22	NPL Division One West	8	0	—		—		1 (Note: Appearance in Northern Premier League Division One West play-offs)	0	9	0
Career total			46	10	3	0	0	0	6	1	55	11
