= Lincoln McFayden =

English footballer

Personal information
- Full name: Lincoln Tye McFayden
- Date of birth: 11 February 2002 (age 24)
- Place of birth: Chorley, England
- Height: 1.71 m (5 ft 7 in)
- Position: Left-back

Team information
- Current team: Macclesfield

Youth career
- 2011–2021: Preston North End

Senior career*
Years	Team	Apps	(Gls)
2021–2024	Swansea City	0	(0)
2024	→ Penybont (loan)	7	(1)
2024–2026	AFC Fylde	55	(2)
2026–	Macclesfield	0	(0)
- * Club domestic league appearances and goals as of 17:52, 18 May 2026 (UTC)

Lincoln Tye McFayden (born 11 February 2002) is an English professional footballer who plays as a left-back for National League North club Macclesfield.

== Career ==
McFayden joined the youth academy of Preston North End in 2011, and after a decade playing for them transferred to Swansea City on 5 May 2021. He made his professional debut with Swansea City in a 3–0 EFL Cup win over Reading on 10 August 2021.

In January 2024, McFayden joined Cymru Premier club Penybont on loan for the remainder of the season. Following the conclusion of the 2023–24 season, he returned to Swansea City where he was announced to be leaving upon the expiration of his contract.

On 17 July 2024, McFayden joined National League side AFC Fylde on a one-year deal following a successful trial period.

In May 2026, McFayden returned to the National League North following AFC Fylde's promotion, joining Macclesfield.

== Honours ==
AFC Fylde

- National League North: 2025–26
