= Marvin Kokos =

French association football player (born 2000)

Marvin Yanis Kokos
Personal information
- Full name: Marvin Yanis Kokos
- Date of birth: 12 October 2000 (age 26)
- Place of birth: Marseille, France
- Position: Winger

Youth career
- 2012–2017: Marseille

Senior career*
Years	Team	Apps	(Gls)
2017	Marseille B	1	(17)
2017–2018	Martigues	0	(8)
2018–2019	Gazélec Ajaccio	3	(1)
2019–2020	Oldham Athletic	0	(0)
2020–2021	FC Échirolles		
2021–202?	ES Fosséenne		
- * Club domestic league appearances and goals as of 10:20, 23 July 2019 (UTC)

Marvin Yanis Kokos (born 12 October 2000) is a French professional footballer who plays as a winger.

== Career ==
=== Professional career ===
A youth product of Olympique de Marseille, Kokos joined FC Martigues in 2017, before signing with Gazélec Ajaccio in 2018. He made his professional debut with Gazélec Ajaccio in a 1–1 Ligue 2 tie with Le Havre AC on 14 December 2018, and scored his side's only goal in his debut.

On 22 July 2019, Kokos joined League Two side Oldham Athletic on a two-year deal with an option for a third, following a successful trial period. However, he was released at the end of the 2019-20 season, after playing only 16 minutes in the EFL Trophy.

On December 5, 2020 it was confirmed that Kokos transferred to French Régional 1 club FC Échirolles. In the 2021-22 season, Kokos reportedly played for French amateur club ES Fosséenne.
