= Tomáš Egert =

Czech footballer

Personal information
- Full name: Tomáš Egert
- Date of birth: 1 August 1994 (age 32)
- Place of birth: Prague, Czech Republic
- Height: 1.92 m (6 ft 4 in)
- Positions: Centre back; defensive midfielder

Youth career
- Bohemians 1905
- Slovan Liberec

Senior career*
Years	Team	Apps	(Gls)
2014–2018	Slovan Liberec		
2014	→ Spartak Trnava		
2014	→ Spartak Trnava II		
2015–2016	→ FK Slavoj Vyšehrad		
- → FK Viktoria Žižkov
2017	→ Slavoj Vyšehrad		
2018	Burton Albion		
2019–2020	Oldham Athletic		
2021–2022	FK Senica		
- * Club domestic league appearances and goals as of 15 April 2022

Tomáš Egert (born 1 August 1994) is a former Czech professional footballer who played primarily as a central defender or defensive midfielder. His career included appearances in the top divisions of Czechia and Slovakia, as well as in the English Football League. He was forced to retire from professional football prematurely due to recurring knee injuries.

== Club career ==
=== Early career ===
Egert began playing football in Brandýs nad Labem. He later joined the academy of Bohemians 1905, where he successfully progressed through all youth levels up to the U21 team. At the age of 18, he transferred to FC Slovan Liberec, a club competing in the Czech First League, where he signed his first professional contract and made appearances in the top tier of Czech football.

=== FC Slovan Liberec ===
Due to his impressive form with the youth team Egert signed professional terms with the club and made his debut in their first team that season at the age of 19 as the team finished the season in 12th place in the top division.

=== Spartak Trnava ===
Egert joined Slovak premier division side Spartak Trnava on loan for the 2014/15 season at the age of 19. Following this loan spell, he was recalled early and brought back into the first-team of FC Slovan Liberec to continue his development.

=== FK Slavoj Vyšehrad ===
The following season, on 1 July 2015, Egert went on a season-long loan to second-tier Czech National League side FK Slavoj Vyšehrad in order to gain first-team experience. The loan move proved to be a success, as Egert started 21 out of a possible 28 league matches, making him the most frequently used player in the team that season. He became an integral part of the starting line-up and gained valuable experience at the senior level.

=== FK Viktoria Žižkov ===
Egert secured another season-long loan, this time with Czech second division side FK Viktoria Žižkov on 1 July 2016. Competing in the Fotbalová národní liga, Egert made 10 league starts during the season. It was another valuable and successful loan spell in professional football, further contributing to his development and consistency at senior level.

=== Burton Albion ===
While pursuing his professional football career, Egert was signed as a free agent by English Championship side Burton Albion on 16 March 2018, following interest from clubs including Doncaster Rovers and Lincoln City. He made his league debut the very next day, featuring against Wolverhampton Wanderers on 17 March 2018. Despite joining late in the season, he quickly earned the trust of the coaching staff and gained valuable experience at Championship level.

Unfortunately, during the summer pre-season ahead of the 2018/2019 campaign, Egert suffered a torn anterior cruciate ligament (ACL), which ruled him out for the entire season and temporarily halted his professional progress for nearly a year.

As an interesting side note, Egert was also studying Sports Management at the University of Derby during his time in England, balancing academic growth with his professional commitments on the pitch.

=== Oldham Athletic ===
Following a year-long recovery from an ACL injury, Egert attracted interest from EFL League Two side Oldham Athletic, who signed him on a one-year contract ahead of the 2019/2020 season. After a successful return from injury, he became a regular part of the matchday squad, featuring consistently in the first team. His comeback demonstrated both physical resilience and mental determination.

Egert continued to perform for Oldham throughout the season until the campaign was suspended due to the COVID-19 pandemic, which brought professional football in England to a temporary halt.

=== FK Senica ===
After returning from England due to the uncertainties caused by the COVID-19 pandemic, Egert signed with Slovak top-flight club FK Senica. He quickly established himself as a key figure in the starting eleven, regularly featuring as a central defensive midfielder. His physical presence, tactical awareness, and leadership made him an important part of the team's core.

Unfortunately, his momentum was once again disrupted when he suffered a second anterior cruciate ligament (ACL) rupture — this time in the same knee — which sidelined him for an extended period and marked a turning point in his professional playing career.

== Post-playing career ==
Following the end of his professional playing career, Egert smoothly transitioned into sports management, supported by his academic background — he holds a master's degree in Sports Management and Marketing from the University of Derby in England. Shortly after retiring, he was offered a role with the Czech national football team.

He later became involved in high-profile project under UEFA, including playing a key role in the successful delivery of the UEFA Europa Conference League Final held in Prague. Building on this experience, Egert went on to join Red Bull, where he currently works as an Athletes Manager, supporting elite sports talent and developing strategic athlete programs.
