= John Rooney (footballer) =

English footballer (born 1990)

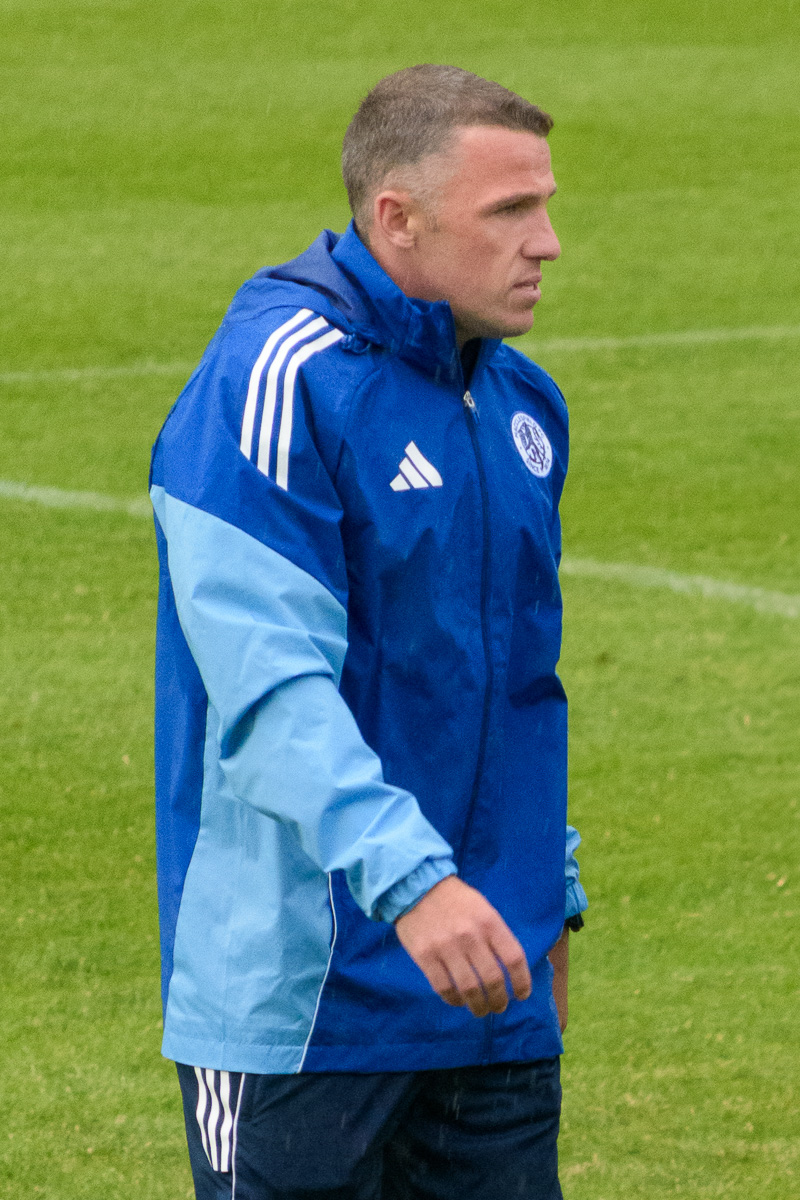
- Rooney in 2025

Personal information
- Full name: John Richard Rooney
- Date of birth: 17 December 1990 (age 35)
- Place of birth: Liverpool, England
- Height: 5 ft 10 in (1.78 m)
- Position: Midfielder

Team information
- Current team: Macclesfield (manager)

Youth career
- 1996–2002: Everton
- 2002–2008: Macclesfield Town

Senior career*
Years	Team	Apps	(Gls)
2008–2010	Macclesfield Town	41	(3)
2011	New York Red Bulls	5	(0)
2012	Orlando City	9	(2)
2012–2013	Barnsley	0	(0)
2013–2014	Bury	3	(0)
2013–2014	→ Chester (loan)	4	(1)
2014–2016	Chester	108	(25)
2016–2017	Wrexham	33	(11)
2017	→ Guiseley (loan)	7	(1)
2017–2018	Guiseley	31	(5)
2018–2020	Barrow	83	(27)
2020–2022	Stockport County	55	(20)
2022	Barrow	27	(5)
2022–2023	Oldham Athletic	32	(2)
2023–2025	Macclesfield	67	(26)
Total		505	(128)

Managerial career
- 2025–: Macclesfield
- * Club domestic league appearances and goals as of 27 April 2025, 07:23 (UTC)

John Richard Rooney (born 17 December 1990) is an English professional manager and former footballer who played as an attacking midfielder. He is currently manager of National League North club Macclesfield.

He is the younger brother of former England forward Wayne Rooney. Although born in England, Rooney expressed a desire to represent the Republic of Ireland at international level.

== Early life ==
John Rooney was born in Liverpool, Merseyside to Jeanette Maria Rooney (née Morrey) and Thomas Wayne Rooney. He is of Irish descent and Polish-Jewish descent. Rooney was brought up in Croxteth with older brothers Graeme and Wayne; all three attended Our Lady and St. Swithin's primary school and the De La Salle Humanities College.

== Playing career ==
=== Macclesfield Town ===
John Rooney started at the Everton Youth Academy at the age of six. After being released by Everton, Rooney moved to Macclesfield Town in 2002, where he signed professional terms on 14 July 2008, 4 months after his professional debut against Barnet on 24 March 2008. His first ever career goal came against Dagenham & Redbridge in a 2–1 loss on 28 March 2009. Rooney's Macclesfield contract expired at the end of the 2009–10 season (after refusing to sign a new contract).

=== New York Red Bulls ===
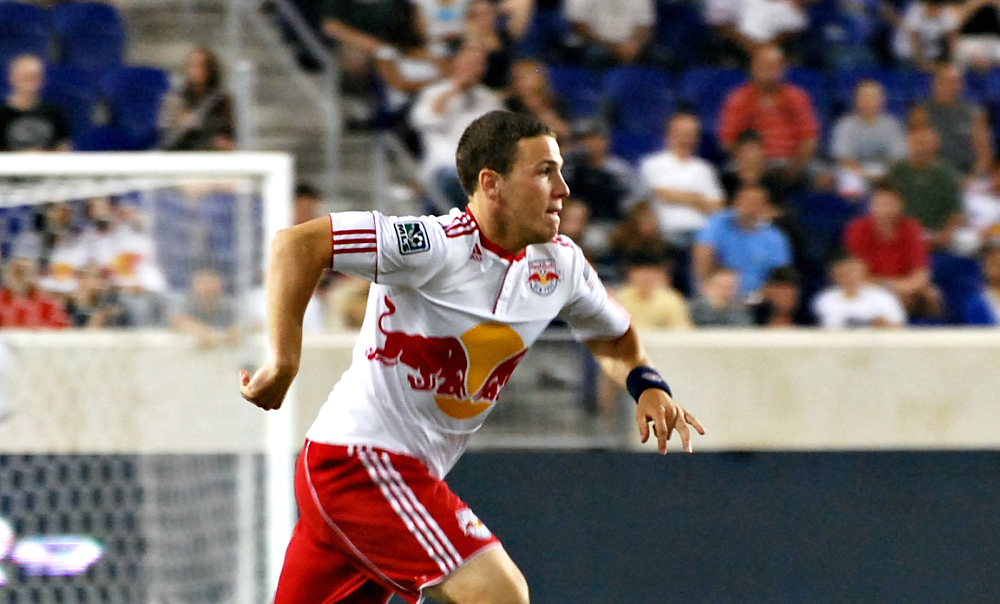
Rooney playing for New York Red Bulls in 2011

After trials with Derby County and Huddersfield Town were unsuccessful Rooney went to the Seattle Sounders and the Portland Timbers on trial to enter the next Major League Soccer Draft. Rooney signed with Major League Soccer on 28 December 2010 and played at the 2011 MLS Combine in Florida.

On 13 January 2011, Rooney was selected in the second round of the 2011 MLS SuperDraft by New York Red Bulls. He made his debut for the club on 16 April as an 89th-minute substitute in a 3–0 victory over San Jose Earthquakes at the Red Bull Arena. On 28 June, in his first start for New York, Rooney scored his first goal for the club in a 2–1 victory over FC New York in the US Open Cup.

=== Orlando City ===
Rooney was waived by New York on 23 November 2011 and he signed with USL Pro club Orlando City on 27 January 2012.

On 25 February 2012, in his debut, Rooney scored his first goal with the club against Toronto FC in the Walt Disney World Pro Soccer Classic in a 2–2 draw. On 15 April, Rooney scored two goals and assisted a goal in a 4–1 win against the Wilmington Hammerheads. On 22 May, Rooney again scored two goals in the second round of the US Open Cup in a 7–0 trashing of KC Athletics. On 27 July, Orlando City won the 2012 Regular season title after they defeated the Charleston Battery 4–0 (with 3 games remaining in the season), as a result, John Rooney won his first championship in his career. Rooney finished the season with 13 appearances and 5 goals as Orlando were eliminated in the Semi-final of the Playoffs to the Wilmington Hammerheads.

=== Barnsley ===
After leaving Orlando City, Rooney was offered a contract by English club Barnsley in October 2012. He signed a contract with the club on 25 October 2012. He was released at the end of the season.

=== Bury ===
On 10 July 2013, Bury announced they had signed Rooney on a twelve-month contract.

=== Chester ===
He was loaned to Conference Premier side Chester until January 2014. He made four appearances and scored once. In January 2014, the transfer was permanent as he signed a contract keeping him until the end of 2014–15 season.

=== Wrexham ===
On 7 June 2016, Rooney signed a one-year deal with Wrexham. He made his debut for the club on the opening day of the 2016–17 season, in a 0–0 draw with Dover Athletic, scoring his first goal for the club in their following match, converting a penalty during a 3–2 victory over Guiseley.

In February 2017, Rooney joined Guiseley on loan for the remainder of the 2016–17 season after being unable to agree terms over a contract dispute. Following his return to Wrexham at the end of the season, Rooney was one of several players who were not offered new deals.

=== Barrow ===
In July 2018, he joined Barrow on a one-year contract. He helped them win the Vanarama National League title in the 2019–20 season, scoring 19 league goals from midfield in that curtailed season, becoming the club's second top scorer after Scott Quigley, winning several club awards and the Mark Harrop National League Player of the Season.

=== Stockport County ===
On 20 July 2020, Rooney signed for National League side Stockport County for an undisclosed fee.

=== Return to Barrow ===
On 30 January 2022, Rooney returned to League Two side Barrow for an undisclosed fee on a two-and-a-half-year deal.

=== Oldham Athletic ===
On 27 September 2022, Rooney signed for National League club Oldham Athletic on a two-year deal with the option for a third following the mutual termination of his Barrow contract earlier that day.

=== Macclesfield ===
On 31 August 2023, Rooney had his contract terminated by mutual consent, allowing him to join Northern Premier League Premier Division club Macclesfield. He helped the Silkmen secure promotion to the National League North as Northern Premier League Champions in 2024–25 before announcing his retirement as a player.

== Coaching career ==
After retirement from football, on 1 July 2025, Rooney was appointed as manager of Macclesfield, following the departure of Robbie Savage.

On 10 January 2026, Rooney coached Macclesfield to a major upset as his side beat FA Cup holders and Premier League side Crystal Palace 2–1 in the FA Cup third round.

== Personal life ==
He is the younger brother of former Manchester United and England captain Wayne Rooney.

His cousin, Tommy Rooney, also played for Macclesfield Town in the 2004–05 season.

== Career statistics ==
As of match played 26 April 2025

Appearances and goals by club, season and competition
Club	Season	League			National Cup		League Cup		Other		Total	
Club	Season	Division	Apps	Goals	Apps	Goals	Apps	Goals	Apps	Goals	Apps	Goals
Macclesfield Town	2007–08	League Two	2	0	0	0	0	0	0	0	2	0
Macclesfield Town	2008–09	League Two	14	2	1	0	1	0	0	0	16	2
Macclesfield Town	2009–10	League Two	25	1	1	0	1	0	1 (Note: Appearance(s) in Football League Trophy)	1	28	2
Macclesfield Town	Total		41	3	2	0	2	0	1	1	46	4
New York Red Bulls	2011	MLS	5	0	2	1	—		0	0	7	1
Orlando City	2012	USL Pro	9	2	0	0	—		0	0	9	2
Barnsley	2012–13	Championship	0	0	0	0	0	0	0	0	0	0
Bury	2013–14	League Two	3	0	0	0	1	0	0	0	4	0
Chester (loan)	2013–14	Conference Premier	4	1	0	0	—		1 (Note: Appearance(s) in FA Trophy)	0	5	1
Chester	2013–14	Conference Premier	21	4	0	0	—		2 (Note: Appearance(s) in Cheshire Senior Cup)	3	23	7
Chester	2014–15	Conference Premier	46	11	4	0	—		2	0	52	11
Chester	2015–16	National League	41	10	1	0	—		6 (Note: Three appearances in FA Trophy, three appearances in Cheshire Senior Cup)	0	48	10
Chester	Total		112	26	5	0	—		11	3	128	29
Wrexham	2016–17	National League	33	11	2	0	—		1	0	36	11
Guiseley (loan)	2016–17	National League	7	1	—		—		—		7	1
Guiseley	2017–18	National League	31	5	3	2	—		2 (Note: One appearance in FA Trophy, one appearance in West Riding County Cup)	0	36	7
Guiseley	Total		38	6	3	2	—		2	0	43	8
Barrow	2018–19	National League	46	10	1	0	—		1	0	48	10
Barrow	2019–20	National League	37	17	1	0	—		1	2	39	19
Barrow	Total		83	27	2	0	—		2	2	87	29
Stockport County	2020–21	National League	36	16	4	4	—		2 (Note: One appearance and one goal in FA Trophy, one appearance in National League play-offs)	1	42	21
Stockport County	2021–22	National League	19	4	3	0	—		1	0	23	4
Stockport County	Total		55	20	7	4	0	0	3	1	65	25
Barrow	2021–22	League Two	19	5	—		—		0	0	19	5
Barrow	2022–23	League Two	8	0	0	0	2	0	1	1	11	1
Barrow	Total		27	5	0	0	2	0	1	1	30	6
Oldham Athletic	2022–23	National League	32	2	3	0	—		1	0	36	2
Macclesfield	2023–24	NPL Premier Division	29	15	4	2	—		10 (Note: Eight appearances and one goal in FA Trophy, two appearances in NPL Premier Division play-offs)	3	43	20
Macclesfield	2024–25	NPL Premier Division	38	11	4	1	—		4	0	46	12
Macclesfield	Total		67	26	8	3	—		14	3	89	32
Career total			505	128	34	10	5	0	36	11	580	149

== Managerial statistics ==
As of match played 22 August 2026

Managerial record by team and tenure
Team	From	To	Record					Ref.
Team	From	To	P	W	D	L	Win %	Ref.
Macclesfield	1 July 2025	Present	64	37	8	19	57.8	
Total			64	37	8	19	57.8	—

== Honours ==
Orlando City

- USL Pro: 2012

Barrow

- National League: 2019–20

Macclesfield

- NPL Premier Division: 2024–25

Individual

- National League Team of the Year: 2019–20, 2020–21
- National League Player of the Month: January 2017, September 2019
- National League Player of the Year: 2019–20, 2020–21
