= Macclesfield F.C. =

Football club in Cheshire, England

Coordinates: 53°14′34″N 02°07′38″W

Macclesfield
- Full name: Macclesfield Football Club
- Nickname: The Silkmen
- Founded: 6 October 2020; 6 years ago
- Ground: Moss Rose
- Capacity: 5,350 (2,095 seated)
- CEO: Keith Curle
- Manager: John Rooney
- League: National League North
- 2025–26: National League North, 4th of 24
- Website: macclesfieldfc.com
Home colours	Away colours	Third colours

Macclesfield Football Club is an association football club based in Macclesfield, Cheshire, England. The club currently competes in the National League North, the sixth tier of the English football league system, and plays its home games at the Moss Rose (known as the Leasing.com Stadium for sponsorship reasons).

Macclesfield is a phoenix club of the former Macclesfield Town F.C. founded in 1874, which was wound-up after a High Court ruling on 16 September 2020. The club joined the North West Counties Premier Division, the fifth step of the National League system ahead of the 2021–22 season. Macclesfield recorded three promotions in the four subsequent seasons, winning the North West Counties Premier Division in 2022, the NPL Division One West in 2023, and the NPL Premier Division in 2025. The team also reached the semi-final of the FA Trophy in 2024. In 2026, they reached the fourth round of the FA Cup by becoming the first sixth-tier team to beat a top-tier team (Premier League side Crystal Palace, the reigning FA Cup holders).

== History ==
Macclesfield F.C. is a successor to Macclesfield Town. Founded in 1874, Macclesfield Town was liquidated and expelled from the National League in 2020 because of debts of over £500,000. Its assets were put up for sale, including the Moss Rose stadium on the Rightmove property website. In October 2020, the stadium and all available assets were purchased by Robert Smethurst, the owner of Stockport Town, with the aim of returning professional football to Macclesfield by creating the phoenix club as Macclesfield F.C. Smethurst appointed the Welsh former professional footballer Robbie Savage as a member of the board for the new phoenix club with Danny Whitaker as manager. He also invested in upgrading the stadium to improve the commercial viability of the new club.

In May 2021, it was announced that Macclesfield would be placed in the NWCFL Premier Division, the fifth step of the National League system (ninth tier in the English football pyramid), for their first season. Savage announced that the club would be joining with his foundation to offer free tickets to foundation participants to encourage youth attendance at the club's matches. Macclesfield entered the FA Vase for the first time in 2021–22.

=== 2021–22 season ===
On 31 July 2021 Macclesfield played their first competitive match, a 1–0 win at home against Burscough in the NWCFL Premier Division played in front of a restricted capacity sell-out crowd of 2,018; Leon Arnasalam scored the only goal. The club's first away match was on 3 August, a 4–4 draw at Winsford United, also in the NWCFL Premier Division, with Tom Clare scoring all four Macclesfield goals. On 7 August Macclesfield played their first FA Cup match, beating Burscough 4–0 in the Extra Preliminary Round, but were then knocked out of in the Preliminary Round losing 6–4 at Squires Gate.

On 30 August Macclesfield defeated local rivals Congleton Town 1–0 in the NWCFL Premier Division in front of a record crowd of 3,502, James Berry-McNally scoring the only goal. The match was suspended for several minutes late in the second half due to crowd trouble. It was the first time the neighbouring towns had met in a league match since the 1964–65 season.

On 11 September, Macclesfield played in the FA Vase for the first time, losing 3–2 at Northern Counties East League Premier Division side Winterton Rangers in the first qualifying round.

Macclesfield F.C. was featured in a BBC Sport documentary film, Robbie Savage: Making Macclesfield FC, broadcast on 13 November 2021, which followed the launch of the new club following the collapse of Macclesfield Town.

Despite a relatively poor run of form at the start of the new year (L2, D1, W2 in January), a run of ten consecutive wins followed, in which 37 goals were scored and only four conceded. On 12 March 2022, Macclesfield secured the North West Counties Premier Division title and promotion to the NPL Division One West after a 4–0 win against Ashton Athletic, becoming the first club in England's top nine tiers in 2022 to guarantee promotion. Macclesfield finished their league campaign on 2 April, 15 points clear of second-placed Skelmersdale United.

=== 2022–23 season ===
In October 2022, with the club three points clear at the top of the NPL West Division, Danny Whitaker was replaced as Macclesfield manager by David McNabb. McNabb stepped down in December 2022, with midfielder Neil Danns being appointed interim manager. A 3–1 win against Trafford on 1 April 2023 saw the club crowned champions and achieve back-to-back promotions.

=== 2023–24 season ===
During the summer of 2023, manager Neil Danns left to take up an assistant role at Tranmere Rovers, and his assistant Mark Duffy was named as the new head coach. Record goal-scorer James Berry departed for a club record fee to join National League side Chesterfield. Luke Duffy joined for a record fee from Warrington Town, and John Rooney, Wayne Rooney's younger brother, returned to the Silkmen having started his career with 41 league appearances for Macclesfield Town.

Macclesfield entered the FA Cup in the first qualifying round. Victories over Whickham, Buxton, and Warrington Rylands secured a place in the fourth qualifying round against Alfreton Town. After four defeats in five games, including a 3–1 FA Cup defeat at Alfreton, Duffy was sacked as head coach on 27 October 2023, and was replaced by Alex Bruce. The Silkmen entered the FA Trophy in the third qualifying round; in the fourth round proper they defeated National League opposition Dorking Wanderers 5–0. Macclesfield were the only side outside of the National League to reach the semi-finals, but were knocked out of the competition in a 2–1 defeat at Gateshead on 7 April.

On 21 February 2024, Bruce stepped down as Macclesfield manager to take up a coaching role at Salford City, and was replaced by Michael Clegg, previously manager at Warrington Rylands. Under Clegg, Macclesfield finished second, qualifying for the NPL play-offs, but lost the play-off final 2–1 to Marine.

=== 2024–25 season ===
Ahead of the 2024–25 season prolific forward Kane Drummond departed to Chesterfield and Luke Murphy was released. On 17 June 2024, Clegg left his role as manager by mutual consent, and Robbie Savage was appointed head coach on the same day. Notable summer signings included winger Justin Johnson, midfielder Danny Whitehead, who had four spells at Macclesfield Town, striker Danny Elliott following his departure from National League North side Scunthorpe United, and goalkeeper Max Dearnley from Buxton.

The team began the season with a 1–0 win away at Worksop Town and remained undefeated until a 2–1 loss away to Mickleover on 28 November. 35 league goals from golden boot winner Danny Elliott and 23 clean sheets from Max Dearnley, helped the team to 109 points - a division and club record. Macclesfield's promotion to the National League North was confirmed with six matches still to play after defeating Bamber Bridge 2–1 on 22 March 2025, becoming 2024–25 Northern Premier League Premier Division champions, and ending two seasons in the seventh tier.

=== 2025–26 season ===
Savage signed a new two-year deal to stay as Macclesfield manager, but two weeks later, on 1 July 2025, opted to become Forest Green Rovers' new manager and was replaced as Silkmen manager by John Rooney. On 16 December 2025, forward Ethan McLeod died in a car accident while returning from a game against Bedford Town. Following the accident, the club retired the number 20 shirt as a tribute to the former player.

The club made history on 10 January 2026 by beating FA Cup holders Crystal Palace 2–1 in the third round to become the first non-league team to defeat the defending champions since 1909 (when Crystal Palace themselves, playing in the Southern League, beat the holders Wolverhampton Wanderers) and the first sixth-tier team to defeat a first-tier team in the history of the FA Cup. The result was widely described at the time as the biggest shock in the competition's history.

In the National League North, Macclesfield finished 4th to reach the play-offs, beating Chester 2–1 in their quarter-final, but subsequently lost 3–1 to Kidderminster Harriers at the semi-final stage. In June 2026, Macclesfield temporarily suspended co-owner Robert Smethurst following his May 2026 arrest on suspicion of controlling and coercive behaviour. On 5 August 2026, Smethurst resigned as a director but remained a shareholder.

== Stadium ==
Macclesfield play their home games in the south of the town at the Leasing.com Stadium, previously home to Macclesfield Town from 1891 until 2020. The stadium's current capacity is 5,350, of which 2,095 is seated. The club's joint highest home attendance was 5,348 on 10 January 2026 for the FA Cup third round tie against Crystal Palace and 16 February 2026 for the FA Cup fourth round tie against Brentford.

The ID Unlimited Main Stand (traditionally known as the London Road or Main Stand) runs along one side of the pitch and consists of a seated grandstand with open air terracing to either side, and the opposite side is the seated Besseges Stand. The club's most vociferous supporters congregate in the WRS Star Lane End, which is a mixture of terracing and seating. Visiting supporters are housed in the open air Silkmen Terrace North (named after a public house which formerly adjoined the terrace) and part of the Besseges Stand.

== Shirt sponsors and manufacturers ==
Period	Kit Manufacturer	Shirt Sponsor
2021–24	Adidas	boohooMAN
2024–26	Adidas	Duck and Cover
2026–present	DNA	Duck and Cover

== Current players ==
=== Current squad ===
As of 31 July 2026

Note: Flags indicate national team as defined under FIFA eligibility rules; some limited exceptions apply. Players may hold more than one non-FIFA nationality.

No.	Pos.	Nation	Player
1	GK	WAL	Christian Dibble
2	DF	ENG	Luke Matheson
3	DF	ENG	Lincoln McFayden
4	MF	ENG	Elliot Osborne
5	DF	ENG	Cameron Borthwick-Jackson
6	MF	ENG	Paul Dawson
7	FW	ENG	Theo Chapman
8	MF	ENG	George Wilson
9	FW	ENG	Adan George
10	FW	ENG	Danny Elliott
11	FW	ENG	Luke Duffy
12	DF	ENG	Sam Heathcote

No.	Pos.	Nation	Player
13	GK	ENG	Paul Cooper
14	MF	ENG	Finley Shrimpton
15	DF	ENG	Luis Lacey
16	DF	ENG	Tom Wilson
18	MF	ENG	Josh Kay
19	FW	ENG	John Ustabasi
22	MF	SCO	Matthew Apter
23	FW	FRA	Veron Parny
24	DF	ENG	Hassan Ayub
25	DF	ENG	Ammar Dyer
27	DF	ENG	Edward Ikpakwu
29	DF	ITA	Muhamed Diomande
33	DF	ENG	Brandon Lee

==== Out on loan ====
Note: Flags indicate national team as defined under FIFA eligibility rules; some limited exceptions apply. Players may hold more than one non-FIFA nationality.

No.	Pos.	Nation	Player
—	DF	ENG	Cameron Bradbury-Allen (on loan at Hyde United)

=== Retired numbers ===
Note: Flags indicate national team as defined under FIFA eligibility rules; some limited exceptions apply. Players may hold more than one non-FIFA nationality.

No.	Pos.	Nation	Player
20	MF	ENG	Ethan McLeod
21	MF	ENG	Richard Butcher

=== Player of the Season Awards ===
Season	Player	Players' Player	Directors' Player	Top Scorer	Ref
2021–22	(Guyana) Neil Danns		(France) Laurent Mendy	(England) Tom Clare	
2022–23	(England) James Berry		(England) Luke Murphy	(England) James Berry	
2023–24	(England) John Rooney	(England) Tre Pemberton		(England) Alex Curran	
2024–25	(England) Danny Elliott	(France) Laurent Mendy	(England) Max Dearnley	(England) Danny Elliott	
2025–26	(England) Paul Dawson	(England) Luke Duffy	(England) Paul Dawson	(England) Danny Elliott	

== Management ==
=== Team management and coaching staff ===
Role	Name
Manager	(England) John Rooney
Assistant Manager	(England) Francis Jeffers
First Team Coach	(England) Anthony Curran
Goalkeeping Coach	(England) Danny Whiting
Physiotherapist	(United States) Merissa Heraldson
Strength and conditioning Coach	(England) Nick Smith
Kitman	(England) Ged Coyne
Ref:

=== Club management and staff ===
Role	Name
CEO	Keith Curle
Director	Sarah-Jane Smethurst
Director	Ama Singh
Director	Jonathan Bull
Head of Business & Match Day Operations	Amanda Penney
General Manager	Lindsay Brown
Head of Finance	Rachael Brown
Deputy CEO / Sponsorships Director	Bob Trafford
Club Secretary	Patrick Birch
Match Day Club Secretary	TBC
Media & Marketing	Chris Goodwin/Ben Leah
F&B GM	Dean Holmes
Gym Manager	Scott Leigh
Groundsmen	Ged Coyne / Jim Goodwin
Ref:

=== Managerial history ===
As of 25 February 2026

Name	Nationality	From	To	P	W	D	L	GF	GA	Win% (Note: Win% is rounded to two decimal places)	Honours
Danny Whitaker	England	13 October 2020	29 October 2022	68	48	7	13	171	71	70.59	1 NWCFL Premier Division
David McNabb	England	31 October 2022	10 December 2022	9	7	1	1	22	9	77.78	
Neil Danns	Guyana	13 December 2022	5 May 2023	21	15	5	1	53	16	71.43	1 NPL Division One West
Mark Duffy	England	5 May 2023	25 October 2023	18	10	2	6	34	21	55.56	
Neil Baker Peter Band Robbie Savage (interim)	England; England; Wales	25 October 2023	31 October 2023	2	2	0	0	6	3	100.00	
Alex Bruce	Northern Ireland	1 November 2023	21 February 2024	22	15	3	4	57	30	68.18	
Michael Clegg	England	22 February 2024	17 June 2024	16	11	0	5	31	15	68.75	
Robbie Savage	Wales	17 June 2024	1 July 2025	51	40	6	5	138	41	78.43	1 NPL Premier Division
John Rooney	England	1 July 2025		42	24	7	11	82	60	57.14	

== Seasons ==
As of 7 August 2026

Key:	Champions	Runners-up	Promoted	Relegated	Semi-finals

Season	League									FA Cup	Other competitions		Top scorer		Average league attendance
Season	Division	Pld	W	D	L	F	A	Pts	Pos	FA Cup	Other competitions		Name	Goals (LG)	Average league attendance
2021–22	NWCFL Premier Division (9) ↑	40	29	7	4	94	38	94	1st	PR	FA Vase	QR1	(England) Tom Clare	23 (21)	3,390
2021–22	NWCFL Premier Division (9) ↑	40	29	7	4	94	38	94	1st	PR	NWCFL Cup	QF	(England) Tom Clare	23 (21)	3,390
2021–22	NWCFL Premier Division (9) ↑	40	29	7	4	94	38	94	1st	PR	Cheshire Cup	R2	(England) Tom Clare	23 (21)	3,390
2022–23	NPL Division One West (8) ↑	38	28	6	4	95	27	90	1st	QR2	FA Trophy	R1	(England) James Berry	33 (24)	3,644
2022–23	NPL Division One West (8) ↑	38	28	6	4	95	27	90	1st	QR2	Cheshire Cup	QF	(England) James Berry	33 (24)	3,644
2023–24	NPL Premier Division (7)	40	24	5	11	84	47	77	2nd	QR4	FA Trophy	SF	(England) Alex Curran	23 (16)	3,302
2023–24	NPL Premier Division (7)	40	24	5	11	84	47	77	2nd	QR4	Cheshire Cup	QF	(England) Alex Curran	23 (16)	3,302
2023–24	NPL Premier Division (7)	40	24	5	11	84	47	77	2nd	QR4	NPL play-offs	RU	(England) Alex Curran	23 (16)	3,302
2024–25	NPL Premier Division (7) ↑	42	35	4	3	109	30	109	1st	QR4	FA Trophy	R3	(England) Danny Elliott	41 (35)	3,150
2024–25	NPL Premier Division (7) ↑	42	35	4	3	109	30	109	1st	QR4	Cheshire Cup	R2	(England) Danny Elliott	41 (35)	3,150
2025–26	National League North (6)	46	24	7	15	81	68	79	4th	R4	FA Trophy	R4	(England) Danny Elliott	15 (11)	
2025–26	National League North (6)	46	24	7	15	81	68	79	4th	R4	Cheshire Cup	R3	(England) Danny Elliott	15 (11)	
2025–26	National League North (6)	46	24	7	15	81	68	79	4th	R4	NLN play-offs	SF	(England) Danny Elliott	15 (11)	

== Records ==
As of 13 May 2026

=== Attendance ===
- Highest home attendance (Top 3):

5,348 v Crystal Palace, 10 January 2026 – FA Cup Third Round

5,348 v Brentford, 16 February 2026 – FA Cup Fourth Round

5,329 v Marine, 6 May 2024 – NPL Premier Division Play-off Final

- Lowest home attendance:

241 v Stalybridge Celtic, 5 November 2024 – Cheshire Senior Cup second round

- Highest away attendance:

3,031 v Gateshead, 6 April 2024 – FA Trophy semi-final

- Lowest away attendance:

181 v Northwich Victoria, 16 November 2022 – Cheshire Senior Cup first round

=== Results ===
- Biggest home win:

7–0 v Tadcaster Albion, 13 September 2022 - FA Trophy first qualifying round

- Heaviest home defeat:

2–5 v Crewe Alexandra, 30 January 2024 – Cheshire Senior Cup quarter-final

- Biggest away win:

0–6 v Vauxhall Motors, 22 February 2022 – NWCFL Premier Division

- Heaviest away defeat:

5–1 v AFC Fylde, 25 November 2025 – National League North

- Highest scoring draw:

4–4 v Winsford United (A), 3 August 2021 – NWCFL Premier Division

- Highest aggregate score:

(10) 6–4 v Squires Gate (A), 21 August 2021 – FA Cup preliminary round

=== Player records ===
- Most appearances (All comps):

188 – (England) Lewis Fensome, 22 January 2022 – 29 April 2026

- Goals scored (All comps):

57 – (England) Danny Elliott, 10 August 2024 – Present

- Goals in a season (All comps):

41 – (England) Danny Elliott, 2024–25

- Goals in a season (League):

35 – (England) Danny Elliott, 2024–25 NPL Premier Division

- Goals scored in a match:

4 – (England) Tom Clare v Winsford United (A), 3 August 2021 – NWCFL Premier Division
4 – (England) James Berry v Avro (H), 19 March 2022 – NWCFL Premier Division
4 – (England) Kane Drummond v Atherton Collieries (H), 21 November 2023 – NPL Premier Division

=== Cup performances ===
- Best FA Cup performance:

Fourth round, 2025–26

- Best FA Trophy performance:

Semi-finals, 2023–24

- Best FA Vase performance:

First qualifying round, 2021–22

- Best Cheshire Senior Cup performance:

Quarter-finals, 2022–23, 2023–24, 2025–26

== Honours ==
League

- NPL Premier Division (level 7)
  - Champions: 2024–25
  - Runners-up: 2023–24
- NPL Division One West (level 8)
  - Champions: 2022–23
- NWCFL Premier Division (level 9)
  - Champions: 2021–22

== Notable players ==
Macclesfield F.C. players who have attained at least one international cap during their career.

- (Northern Ireland) Alex Bruce
- (Guyana) Neil Danns
- (Barbados) Justin Griffith
- (Iraq) Ali Hayder
- (Senegal) Oumar Niasse
- (Hong Kong) Lee Holam
