= 2020–21 Oldham Athletic A.F.C. season =

Oldham Athletic
2020–21 season
- Chairman: Abdallah Lemsagam
- Head coach: Harry Kewell (until 7 March); Keith Curle (from 8 March)
- Stadium: Boundary Park
- League Two: 18th
- FA Cup: Third round
- EFL Cup: Second round
- EFL Trophy: Second round
- Top goalscorer: League: Conor McAleny (17); All: Conor McAleny (21)
- Highest home attendance: n/a
- Lowest home attendance: n/a
- Average home league attendance: n/a
Home colours	Away colours	Third colours

The 2020–21 season was Oldham Athletic's 126th season in their history and third consecutive season in the English football's fourth tier. Along with competing in League Two, the club also participated in this season's editions of the FA Cup, EFL Cup and EFL Trophy. In March 2021 near the end of the season Harry Kewell was sacked along with assistant Alan Maybury. The following day Keith Curle was appointed manager.

== Transfers ==
=== Transfers in ===
Date	Position	Nationality	Name	From	Fee	Ref.
2 August 2020	LB	(England)	Cameron Borthwick-Jackson	(England) Manchester United	Free transfer	
2 August 2020	CB	(Portugal)	Sido Jombati	(England) Wycombe Wanderers	Free transfer	
2 August 2020	CB	(England)	Carl Piergianni	(England) Salford City	Undisclosed	
11 August 2020	LW	(England)	Davis Keillor-Dunn	(Wales) Wrexham	Free transfer	
18 August 2020	CF	(England)	Conor McAleny	(England) Fleetwood Town	Free transfer	
28 August 2020	DM	(England)	Callum Whelan	(England) Watford	Free transfer	
1 September 2020	LB	(England)	Jordan Barnett	(England) Pontefract Collieries	Free transfer	
1 September 2020	CB	(England)	Kyle Jameson	(England) AFC Fylde	Free transfer	
6 September 2020	AM	(Australia)	George Blackwood	(Australia) Adelaide United	Free transfer	
9 September 2020	LB	(Italy)	Andrea Badan	(Italy) Hellas Verona	Free transfer	
2 October 2020	AM	(Republic of the Congo)	Dylan Bahamboula	(Bulgaria) Tsarko Selo Sofia	Free transfer	
16 October 2020	GK	(England)	Laurence Bilboe	(England) Rotherham United	Free transfer	
16 October 2020	DM	(Belgium)	Brice Ntambwe	Free agent	Free transfer	
10 November 2020	RB	(France)	Raphaël Diarra	Free agent	Free transfer	
22 January 2020	AM	(Wales)	Nicky Adams	(England) Northampton Town	Undisclosed	
22 January 2020	CF	(England)	Marcus Barnes	(England) Southampton	Free transfer	

=== Loans in ===
Date from	Position	Nationality	Name	From	Date until	Ref.
7 August 2020	GK	(Republic of Ireland)	Ian Lawlor	(England) Doncaster Rovers	End of season	
10 August 2020	CM	(England)	Bobby Grant	(Wales) Wrexham	End of season	
2 September 2020	AM	(England)	Ben Garrity	(England) Blackpool	End of season	
25 September 2020	CM	(Northern Ireland)	Alfie McCalmont	(England) Leeds United	End of season	
16 October 2020	CB	(England)	Harry Clarke	(England) Arsenal	20 January 2021	
13 January 2021	RW	(Germany)	Marcel Hilßner	(England) Coventry City	End of season	
1 February 2021	RM	(Azerbaijan)	Serhat Tasdemir	(England) Peterborough United	End of season	
13 March 2021	GK	(England)	Laurie Walker	(England) Milton Keynes Dons	20 March 2021	

=== Loans out ===
Date from	Position	Nationality	Name	To	Date until	Ref.
5 October 2020	GK	(England)	Gary Woods	(Scotland) Aberdeen	End of season	
12 December 2020	FW	(England)	Vani Da Silva	(England) Curzon Ashton	10 January 2021	

=== Transfers out ===
Date	Position	Nationality	Name	To	Fee	Ref.
1 July 2020	CF	(England)	Kielen Adams	(England) Clitheroe	Released	
1 July 2020	GK	(England)	Ellis Allen	(Cyprus) APEA Akrotiri	Free transfer	
1 July 2020	CF	(Benin)	Désiré Segbé Azankpo	(France) Villefranche	Released	
1 July 2020	CM	(England)	Reece Gaskell	Free agent	Released	
1 July 2020	CB	(Scotland)	Alex Iacovitti	(Scotland) Ross County	Free transfer	
1 July 2020	CB	(England)	Taylor Jones	Free agent	Released	
1 July 2020	CF	(France)	Marvin Kokos	Free agent	Released	
1 July 2020	DM	(Republic of Ireland)	Chris McCann	(Republic of Ireland) Shamrock Rovers	Released	
1 July 2020	CF	(England)	Lewis McKinney	Free agent	Released	
1 July 2020	RB	(England)	Zak Mills	(England) Port Vale	Released	
1 July 2020	LW	(Curaçao)	Gevaro Nepomuceno	(England) FC Halifax Town	Released	
1 July 2020	CB	(England)	Jamie Stott	(England) Stockport County	Released	
1 July 2020	RB	(England)	Javid Swaby-Neavin	(England) Radcliffe	Released	
1 July 2020	DM	(France)	Mohamad Sylla	(France) Stade Lavallois	Free transfer	
1 July 2020	CF	(England)	Scott Wilson	(England) Notts County	Released	
7 July 2020	DF	(England)	Jack Grundy	(England) Mossley	Free transfer	
15 July 2020	FW	(England)	Zac Emmerson	(England) Brighton & Hove Albion	Undisclosed	
27 July 2020	DM	(Republic of the Congo)	Christopher Missilou	(England) Northampton Town	Free transfer	
8 January 2021	CM	(France)	Mohamed Maouche	(Scotland) Ross County	Free transfer	
20 January 2021	CF	(England)	Danny Rowe	(England) Bradford City	Undisclosed	
29 January 2021	RB	(England)	Tom Hamer	(England) Burton Albion	Undisclosed	
1 February 2021	LB	(England)	Jordan Barnett	(England) Notts County	Free transfer	
12 March 2021	CB	(England)	David Wheater	Free agent	Mutual consent	

== Pre-season ==
15 August 2020 Friendly	Oldham Athletic	3–3	Accrington Stanley	Oldham
12:00 BST	Keillor-Dunn; Grant; Dearnley	Report	Piergianni og Pritchard; Cassidy	Stadium: Chapel Road; Attendance: 0

19 August 2020 Friendly	Curzon Ashton	2–3	Oldham Athletic	Ashton-under-Lyne
16:00 BST	Trialist; Tharme	Report	McAleny; Keillor-Dunn; Trialist	Stadium: Tameside Stadium; Attendance: 0

23 August 2020 Friendly	Nottingham Forest	0–2	Oldham Athletic	Nottingham
13:00 BST		Report	Keillor-Dunn 5'; Dearnley 30'	Stadium: Nigel Doughty Academy; Attendance: 0

25 August 2020 Friendly	Oldham Athletic	0–1	Rochdale	Oldham
13:00 BST		Report	Newby 30'	Stadium: Chapel Road; Attendance: 0

29 August 2020 Friendly	Oldham Athletic	2–1	Lincoln City	Oldham
13:00 BST	McAleny 38'; Keillor-Dunn 82'	Report	Scully 48'	Stadium: Boundary Park; Attendance: 0

== Competitions ==
=== EFL League Two ===
==== League table ====
Pos	Team	Pld	W	D	L	GF	GA	GD	Pts
14	Stevenage	46	14	18	14	41	41	0	60
15	Bradford City	46	16	11	19	48	53	−5	59
16	Mansfield Town	46	13	19	14	57	55	+2	58
17	Harrogate Town	46	16	9	21	52	61	−9	57
18	Oldham Athletic	46	15	9	22	72	81	−9	54
19	Walsall	46	11	20	15	45	53	−8	53
20	Colchester United	46	11	18	17	44	61	−17	51
21	Barrow	46	13	11	22	53	59	−6	50
22	Scunthorpe United	46	13	9	24	41	64	−23	48

Updated to match(es) played on 31 May 2021. Source: EFL Official Website
Rules for classification: 1) Points; 2) Goal difference; 3) Number of goals scored; 4) Head-to-head results; 5) Wins; 6) Away goals; 7) Penalty points (sec 9.5); 8) 12-point sending off offences

==== Results summary ====
Overall								Home						Away					
Pld	W	D	L	GF	GA	GD	Pts	W	D	L	GF	GA	GD	W	D	L	GF	GA	GD
46	15	9	22	72	81	−9	54	6	2	15	31	42	−11	9	7	7	41	39	+2

Last updated: 8 May 2021.
Source: BBC

==== Results by matchday ====
Matchday	1	2	3	4	5	6	7	8	9	10	11	12	13	14	15	16	17	18	19	20	21	22	23	24	25	26	27	28	29	30	31	32	33	34	35	36	37	38	39	40	41	42	43	44	45	46
Ground	H	A	H	A	A	A	H	H	A	A	H	H	A	A	H	A	H	H	A	H	A	H	A	H	A	H	A	A	H	A	H	H	A	H	A	A	H	A	H	A	H	A	A	H	A	H
Result	L	L	L	D	L	W	D	L	W	L	W	L	W	W	L	W	W	L	W	L	D	L	D	W	L	W	L	D	L	W	L	D	D	L	D	D	W	L	L	W	W	L	W	L	L	L
Position	21	22	21	22	22	19	19	22	20	20	19	20	17	17	17	16	15	16	14	14	14	16	16	14	15	13	17	17	17	15	17	16	17	17	17	17	17	17	18	17	16	17	15	16	18	18

Updated to match(es) played on 8 May 2021. Source: 11v11 for league tables and fixtures
A = Away; H = Home; W = Win; D = Draw; L = Loss

==== Matches ====
Win Draw Loss Postponed

The 2020–21 season fixtures were released on 21 August.

12 September 2020 1	Oldham Athletic	0–1	Leyton Orient	Oldham
15:00 BST		Report	Brophy (yellow card) 25'; Happe (yellow card) 52'; Johnson 89'	Stadium: Boundary Park; Attendance: 0 Referee: Declan Bourne

19 September 2020 2	Stevenage	3–0	Oldham Athletic	Stevenage
15:00 BST	Osborne 61'; Effiong (penalty missed) 64'; Wildin 65'; Prosser 82'; List (yellow card) 90+4'	Report	Garrity (yellow card) 69'	Stadium: Lamex Stadium; Attendance: 0 Referee: Charles Breakspear

26 September 2020 3	Oldham Athletic	2–3	Crawley Town	Oldham
15:00 BST	Rowe 30'; McAleny 80'	Report	Nadesan 31'; Francomb 39'; Ferguson (yellow card) 55'; Nichols 69' (yellow card) 72'	Stadium: Boundary Park; Attendance: 0 Referee: Darren Drysdale

3 October 2020 4	Colchester United	3–3	Oldham Athletic	Colchester
15:00 BST	Bramall (yellow card) 9'; Senior (yellow card) 18'; Stevenson 27' (yellow card) 78'; Harriott 37' (pen.); Welch-Hayes 65' (yellow card) 83'	Report	McAleny 52' (pen.), 89'; Piergianni 54'; Barnett (yellow card) 81'	Stadium: JobServe Community Stadium; Attendance: 0 Referee: Paul Howard

10 October 2020 5	Oldham Athletic	2–3	Morecambe	Oldham
15:00 BST	McAleny 52', 90'	Report	Wildig 42'; Gibson (yellow card) 57'; Kenyon 59'; Stockton 66'	Stadium: Boundary Park; Attendance: 0 Referee: Josh Smith

17 October 2020 6	Bolton Wanderers	1–2	Oldham Athletic	Horwich
15:00 BST	Delfouneso 32'; Brockbank (yellow card) 48'	Report	Garrity 28' (yellow card) 63'; Hamer (yellow card) 74'; Rowe (yellow card) 84'; Piergianni (yellow card) 88'; Dearnley 90+5'	Stadium: University of Bolton Stadium; Attendance: 0 Referee: Bobby Madley

20 October 2020 7	Oldham Athletic	1–1	Carlisle United	Oldham
19:00 BST	Barnett (yellow card) 61'; Dearnley 80'	Report	Hayden 54'	Stadium: Boundary Park; Attendance: 0 Referee: Matt Donohue

24 October 2020 8	Oldham Athletic	1–2	Port Vale	Oldham
15:00 BST	Rowe (yellow card) 37'; Barnett (yellow card) 44'; Dearnley 50'; Piergianni (yellow card) 75'	Report	Smith 12'; Clark 39'; Joyce (yellow card) 61'	Stadium: Boundary Park; Attendance: 0 Referee: Martin Coy

27 October 2020 9	Southend United	1–2	Oldham Athletic	Southend-on-Sea
19:00 GMT	Clifford 76'	Report	Grant 49'; Piergianni (yellow card) 74'; Dearnley 89'; Clarke (yellow card) 90+4'	Stadium: Roots Hall; Attendance: 0 Referee: Chris Sarginson

31 October 2020 10	Salford City	2–0	Oldham Athletic	Salford
15:00 GMT	Wilson 24'; Lowe (yellow card) 30'; Hunter 73'; Thomas-Asante (yellow card) 80'	Report	Borthwick-Jackson (yellow card) 31'	Stadium: Moor Lane; Attendance: 0 Referee: Anthony Backhouse

3 November 2020 11	Oldham Athletic	2–1	Cheltenham Town	Oldham
18:00 GMT	Blackwood 34'; Bahamboula (yellow card) 82'; Clarke 85'	Report	Thomas (yellow card) 26'; Reid 30'; Clements (yellow card) 55'; May (yellow card) 77'	Stadium: Boundary Park; Attendance: 0 Referee: Will Finnie

14 November 2020 12	Oldham Athletic	0–2	Scunthorpe United	Oldham
15:00 GMT	Hamer (yellow card) 34'	Report	Bedeau 60'; Eisa (yellow card) 62' van Veen 78'	Stadium: Boundary Park; Attendance: 0 Referee: Lee Swabey

21 November 2020 13	Exeter City	1–2	Oldham Athletic	Exeter
15:00 GMT	Williams 12'; Taylor (yellow card) 24'; Randall (yellow card) 40'	Report	Blackwood 21'; Rowe 32'; Borthwick-Jackson (yellow card) 47'; Garrity (yellow card) 59'	Stadium: St James Park; Attendance: 0 Referee: Steve Martin

24 November 2020 14	Barrow	3–4	Oldham Athletic	Barrow-in-Furness
19:00 GMT	Quigley 16'; Biggins (yellow card) 54'; Barry (yellow card) 57'; Platt 79'; Kay (yellow card) 87'; Piergianni 90+9' (o.g.)	Report	Garrity 39'; Rowe 45+2', 82' (pen.); Diarra (yellow card) 58'; Borthwick-Jackson (yellow card) 72'; McAleny 90+5'	Stadium: Furness Building Society Stadium; Attendance: 0 Referee: Declan Bourne

1 December 2020 15	Oldham Athletic	0–1	Tranmere Rovers	Oldham
19:00 GMT	Piergianni (yellow card) 25'; Ntambwe (yellow card) 61'; Barnett (yellow card) 84'	Report	Spearing (yellow card) 16'; Vaughan 27'	Stadium: Boundary Park; Attendance: 0 Referee: Alan Young

5 December 2020 16	Cambridge United	1–2	Oldham Athletic	Cambridge
15:00 GMT	Mullin (penalty missed) 43' 90+1'; Dunk (yellow card) 45+1'	Report	Grant (yellow card) 41'; McCalmont (yellow card) 53' (goal) 60'; McAleny 57' (yellow card) 63'; Borthwick-Jackson (yellow card) 77'	Stadium: Abbey Stadium; Attendance: 1,970; Referee: Brett Huxtable

12 December 2020 17	Oldham Athletic	3–1	Bradford City	Oldham
15:00 GMT	Bahamboula 10'; Piergianni 26'; Grant (yellow card) 38'; Ntambwe (yellow card) 50'; Keillor-Dunn 74'; McAleny (yellow card) 89'	Report	Hosannah (yellow card) 37'; O'Connor (yellow card) 57' (goal) 85'	Stadium: Boundary Park; Attendance: 0 Referee: Anthony Backhouse

15 December 2020 18	Oldham Athletic	2–3	Walsall	Oldham
19:00 GMT	Piergianni (yellow card) 24' (goal) 68'; Fage 55'; Garrity (yellow card) 90+3'	Report	Gordon 23' (pen.); Piergianni 52' (o.g.); Adebayo 73'; Clarke (yellow card) 90+4'	Stadium: Boundary Park; Attendance: 0 Referee: James Bell

19 December 2020 19	Newport County	2–4	Oldham Athletic	Newport
15:00 GMT	Twine 8'; Bennett 41'; Amond (penalty missed) 71'; Haynes (yellow card) 80'	Report	Keillor-Dunn 14'; Clarke (yellow card) 48'; McAleny 58'; Ntambwe (yellow card) 81'; McCalmont 85'; Dearnley 90+3'	Stadium: Rodney Parade; Attendance: 0 Referee: Bobby Madley

26 December 2020 20	Oldham Athletic	1–2	Harrogate Town	Oldham
15:00 GMT	McAleny 19' (pen.); Grant (red card) 43'; Garrity (yellow card) 75'	Report	Thomson 30', 71'	Stadium: Boundary Park; Attendance: 0 Referee: Ben Speedie

29 December 2020 21	Grimsby Town	0–0	Oldham Athletic	Cleethorpes
19:00 GMT	Pollock (yellow card) 39'; Hewitt (yellow card) 86'; Preston (yellow card) 88'	Report	Piergianni (yellow card) 33'; Garrity (yellow card) 68'; Ntambwe (yellow card) 86'	Stadium: Blundell Park; Attendance: 0 Referee: Tom Nield

12 January 2021 22	Oldham Athletic	2–3	Mansfield Town	Oldham
19:45 GMT	McCalmont 6'; McAleny (yellow card) 61', (goal) 84'; Rowe (yellow card) 65'	Report	Cook (yellow card) 34'; Charsley 36'; Sweeney 38'; Bowery (penalty missed) 45+4'; Reid 49'; Lapslie (yellow card) 87'	Stadium: Boundary Park; Attendance: 0 Referee: Scott Oldham

16 January 2021 23	Walsall	1–1	Oldham Athletic	Bescot
15:00 GMT	Jules 45'; Scarr (yellow card) 71'	Report	Hamer (yellow card) 44'; Clarke (yellow card) 61'; Borthwick-Jackson (yellow card) 70'; Keillor-Dunn 75'	Stadium: Banks's Stadium; Attendance: 0 Referee: Christopher Pollard

23 January 2021 24	Oldham Athletic	3–2	Newport County	Oldham
15:00 GMT	Hilßner (yellow card) 6'; Keillor-Dunn 8'; Grant 29'; Demetriou 74' (o.g.); Adams (yellow card) 87'; Clarke (yellow card) 90+4'	Report	Scrimshaw 3'; Labadie (red card) 14'; Gambin 40'; Bennett (yellow card) 76'	Stadium: Boundary Park; Attendance: 0 Referee: Chris Sarginson

26 January 2021 25	Cheltenham Town	2–0	Oldham Athletic	Cheltenham
19:00 GMT	Williams 54'; May (yellow card) 62', (goal) 83'	Report		Stadium: Whaddon Road Ground; Attendance: 0 Referee: Carl Brook

30 January 2021 26	Oldham Athletic	2–1	Salford City	Oldham
15:00 GMT	Bahamboula 75'; Clarke (yellow card) 76'; Keillor-Dunn 90+2'	Report	Henderson 9'; Coutts (yellow card) 72'	Stadium: Boundary Park; Attendance: 0 Referee: Thomas Bramall

16 February 2021 27	Forest Green Rovers	4–3	Oldham Athletic	Nailsworth
19:00 GMT	Cargill 12', 35'; Sweeney (yellow card) 57'; Matt 60'; Bailey (yellow card) 64'; Davison 67'	Report	Lawlor (yellow card) 34'; Badan (yellow card) 38'; Grant 40'; Hilßner (yellow card) 45+1'; McAleny 54', 63'	Stadium: The Innocent [Insert Name Here] Stadium; Attendance: 0 Referee: Robert Lewis

20 February 2021 28	Tranmere Rovers	2–2	Oldham Athletic	Birkenhead
15:00 GMT	Clarke (yellow card) 8'; Vaughan (penalty missed) 39'; Macdonald 42'; Woolery (yellow card) 44', (goal) 51'; Lewis (yellow card) 90+4'	Report	Keillor-Dunn 2', (yellow card) 31'; Jombati (yellow card) 8' (yellow-red card) 47'; Bahamboula 78'; Blackwood (yellow card) 87'	Stadium: Prenton Park; Attendance: 0 Referee: Seb Stockbridge

23 February 2021 29	Oldham Athletic	0–1	Barrow	Oldham
19:00 GMT	Vaughan (yellow card) 90+4'	Report	Dixon (yellow card) 84'; Quigley 89'	Stadium: Boundary Park; Attendance: 0 Referee: Michael Salisbury

27 February 2021 30	Carlisle United	1–3	Oldham Athletic	Carlisle
15:00 GMT	Kayode 35'; Tanner (yellow card) 70'; Anderton (yellow card) 85'	Report	Diarra (yellow card) 33'; Hilßner 71' (pen.); Bahamboula 78'; Piergianni 86'	Stadium: Brunton Park; Attendance: 0 Referee: Carl Boyeson

2 March 2021 31	Oldham Athletic	0–2	Bolton Wanderers	Oldham
19:00 GMT	Jameson (red card) 29'; Piergianni (yellow card) 65'	Report	Clarke 19' (o.g.); Doyle 39'; Lee (yellow card) 56'	Stadium: Boundary Park; Attendance: 0 Referee: James Oldham

6 March 2021 32	Oldham Athletic	0–0	Southend United	Oldham
15:00 GMT		Report	Demetriou (yellow card) 88'	Stadium: Boundary Park; Attendance: 0 Referee: Ollie Yates

9 March 2021 33	Port Vale	0–0	Oldham Athletic	Burslem
19:45 GMT	Guthrie (yellow card) 20'; Swan (yellow card) 78'; Legge (yellow card) 80'	Report	Badan (yellow card) 12'; Bahamboula (yellow card) 15'	Stadium: Vale Park; Attendance: 0 Referee: Kevin Johnson

13 March 2021 34	Oldham Athletic	2–4	Cambridge United	Oldham
15:00 GMT	Keillor-Dunn 3', 11', (penalty missed) 69'	Report	Mullin 25' (pen.); Taylor (yellow card) 27'; Iredale 36', 45+2', (yellow card) 57'; O'Neil (yellow card) 45+3'; Hannant 73'; Drysdale (yellow card) 76'	Stadium: Boundary Park; Attendance: 0 Referee: Brett Huxtable

16 March 2021 35	Scunthorpe United	1–1	Oldham Athletic	Scunthorpe
19:00 GMT	Spence (yellow card) 70'; Loft (yellow card) 87'; Hallam 90+3'	Report	McCalmont 48'; Jameson (yellow card) 53'; Keillor-Dunn (yellow card) 72'	Stadium: Sands Venue Stadium; Attendance: 0 Referee: Sam Allison

20 March 2021 36	Bradford City	0–0	Oldham Athletic	Bradford
15:00 GMT	Sutton (yellow card) 24'; O'Connor (yellow card) 35'	Report		Stadium: Utilita Energy Stadium; Attendance: 0 Referee: Andy Haines

23 March 2021 37	Oldham Athletic	2–1	Exeter City	Oldham
19:00 GMT	Jameson 35'; McCalmont 55'; Walker (yellow card) 80'	Report	Sparkes 67'; Collins (yellow card) 77'	Stadium: Boundary Park; Attendance: 0 Referee: Sam Purkiss

27 March 2021 38	Leyton Orient	2–1	Oldham Athletic	Leyton
15:00 GMT	Wilkinson 8'; Kemp 43'; Abrahams (yellow card) 90+1'	Report	McCalmont 61', (yellow card) 90+2'; McAleny (yellow card) 74'; Diarra (yellow card) 90+4'	Stadium: Breyer Group Stadium; Attendance: 0 Referee: Darren Drysdale

2 April 2021 39	Oldham Athletic	0–1	Stevenage	Oldham
15:00 BST	McCalmont (yellow card) 45'; Piergianni (yellow card) 63'	Report	Cuthbert 24'; Coker (yellow card) 52'; Norris (penalty missed) 75'	Stadium: Boundary Park; Attendance: 0 Referee: Ben Toner

5 April 2021 40	Crawley Town	1–4	Oldham Athletic	Crawley
15:00 BST	Craig (yellow card) 64'; Tsaroulla (yellow card) 65'; Tilley 90'	Report	McAleny 40', 47'; Borthwick-Jackson 41'; Bahamboula 90+5'	Stadium: The People's Pension Stadium; Attendance: 0 Referee: James Adcock

9 April 2021 41	Oldham Athletic	5–2	Colchester United	Oldham
19:00 BST	McAleny 37' (pen.); McCalmont 42'; Piergianni 56', (yellow card) 66'; Bahamboula (yellow card) 68'; Clarke (yellow card) 79'; Adams (yellow card) 82'; Keillor-Dunn 90+1', 90+5'	Report	Eastman (yellow card) 41'; Nouble 64'; Eastman 81'; Stevenson (yellow card) 90+7'	Stadium: Boundary Park; Attendance: 0 Referee: Martin Coy

17 April 2021 42	Morecambe	4–3	Oldham Athletic	Morecambe
12:30 BST	Mendes Gomes 5', 53'; Wildig 42'; Stockton 45+1'	Report	McAleny 39'; Borthwick-Jackson 78'; Jameson 88'	Stadium: Mazuma Stadium; Attendance: 0 Referee: Michael Salisbury

20 April 2021 43	Harrogate Town	0–3	Oldham Athletic	Harrogate
19:00 BST		Report	McCalmont 7'; Bahamboula 46'; Blackwood 75'	Stadium: The EnviroVent Stadium; Attendance: 0 Referee: Carl Boyeson

24 April 2021 44	Oldham Athletic	1–2	Grimsby Town	Oldham
15:00 BST	McAleny 30'; Whelan (yellow card) 39'	Report	Coke (yellow card) 6'; Green 36'; Menayese (yellow card) 73'; Matete 80'; Khouri (yellow card) 89'	Stadium: Boundary Park; Attendance: 0 Referee: Alan Young

1 May 2021 45	Mansfield Town	4–1	Oldham Athletic	Mansfield
15:00 BST	Sinclair 12'; Lapslie 38', 80'; Reid 88'	Report	Dearnley 51'; Clarke (yellow card) 77'	Stadium: One Call Stadium; Attendance: 0 Referee: Antony Coggins

8 May 2021 46	Oldham Athletic	0–3	Forest Green Rovers	Oldham
15:00 BST	Clarke (yellow card) 36'; Sutton (yellow card) 84'	Report	Collins 63' (pen.), 80'; Bailey 65'	Stadium: Boundary Park; Attendance: 0 Referee: Seb Stockbridge

=== FA Cup ===
The draw for the first round was made on Monday 26, October. The second round draw was revealed on Monday, 9 November by Danny Cowley. The third round draw was made on 30 November, with Premier League and EFL Championship clubs all entering the competition.

Win Draw Loss

8 November 2020 First round	Hampton & Richmond Borough	2–3	Oldham Athletic	Hampton
12:45 GMT	Deadfield 30' (pen.), 75'; Miller-Rodney (yellow card) 40' (yellow-red card) 90+3'; Gray (yellow card) 90+2'	Report	Garrity 6'; Clarke (yellow card) 32'; Grant 40'; Rowe 49'	Stadium: The Beveree Stadium; Attendance: 0 Referee: Sam Purkiss

28 November 2020 Second round	Bradford City	1–2	Oldham Athletic	Bradford
15:00 GMT	Donaldson 11' (pen.); Wood (yellow card) 90'	Report	McAleny 18'; Rowe 47'; Piergianni (yellow card) 74'	Stadium: Utilita Energy Stadium; Attendance: 0 Referee: Martin Coy

9 January 2021 Third round	Oldham Athletic	1–4	Bournemouth	King's Park
15:00 GMT	Bahamboula 45+1' (pen.); Clarke (yellow card) 81'	Report	Brooks 43'; Riquelme 49'; King 74', 86'	Stadium: Vitality Stadium; Attendance: 0 Referee: Andy Woolmer

=== EFL Cup ===
Win Draw Loss

The first round draw was made on 18 August, live on Sky Sports, by Paul Merson. The draw for both the second and third round were confirmed on September 6, live on Sky Sports by Phil Babb.

5 September 2020 First round	Oldham Athletic	3–0	Carlisle United	Oldham
15:00 BST	Garrity 29'; Grant 37'; McAleny 89'; Da Silva (yellow card) 90+2'	Report	Anderton (yellow card) 53'; McDonald (yellow card) 67'; Hayden (yellow card) 90+1'	Stadium: Boundary Park; Attendance: 0 Referee: Carl Boyeson

15 September 2020 Second round	Morecambe	1–0	Oldham Athletic	Morecambe
19:45 BST	Wildig 22'; Kenyon (yellow card) 30'	Report	Badan (yellow card) 38'; Hamer (yellow card) 60'; Garrity (yellow card) 62'; Whelan (yellow card) 73'; Grant (yellow card) 90'	Stadium: Mazuma Stadium; Attendance: 0 Referee: Ben Toner

=== EFL Trophy ===
Win Draw Loss

The regional group stage draw was confirmed on 18 August. The second round draw was made by Matt Murray on 20 November, at St Andrew's.

Pos	Div	Team	Pld	W	PW	PL	L	GF	GA	GD	Pts	Qualification
1	L2	Oldham Athletic	3	3	0	0	0	9	1	+8	9	Advance to Round 2
2	ACA	Wolverhampton Wanderers U21	3	1	1	0	1	3	6	−3	5	Advance to Round 2
3	L2	Bradford City	3	0	0	2	1	2	4	−2	2	
4	L1	Doncaster Rovers	3	0	1	0	2	1	4	−3	2	

Source: EFL.com

22 September 2020 Group stage	Oldham Athletic	4–0	Wolverhampton Wanderers U21	Oldham
19:45 BST	Rowe 42'; Hough (yellow card) 57'; Badan (yellow card) 58'; Barnett (yellow card) 64'; Grant 85'; McAleny 88', 90+1'	Report		Stadium: Boundary Park; Attendance: 0

6 October 2020 Group stage	Oldham Athletic	2–0	Doncaster Rovers	Oldham
19:45 BST	Rowe 66'; Grant (yellow card) 82'; Dearnley 86'; Barnett (yellow card) 90+2'			Stadium: Boundary Park; Referee: Tom Nield

10 November 2020 Group stage	Bradford City	1–3	Oldham Athletic	Bradford
19:30 GMT	Cousin-Dawson (yellow card) 46'; Sutton (yellow card) 51'; Sutton 60' (o.g.)	Report	Keillor-Dunn 7'; Hamer (yellow card) 80'; McCalmont 84', 90+3'	Stadium: Utilita Energy Stadium; Attendance: 0 Referee: Scott Oldham

8 December 2020 Second round	Oldham Athletic	1–2	Sunderland	Oldham
18:00 GMT	Grant 13' (yellow card) 83'; Diarra (yellow card) 64'	Report	Maguire 30'; Scowen 64'; Wright (yellow card) 83'	Stadium: Boundary Park; Attendance: 0 Referee: Sam Barrott

== Squad statistics ==
As of match played 8 May 2021

=== Appearances ===
Players with no appearances are not included on the list.

No.	Pos.	Nat.	Player	League Two			FA Cup			EFL Cup			EFL Trophy			Total		
No.	Pos.	Nat.	Player	Apps	Starts	Subs	Apps	Starts	Subs	Apps	Starts	Subs	Apps	Starts	Subs	Apps	Starts	Subs
10	MF	(England)	Davis Keillor-Dunn	41	34	7	2	2	0	2	1	1	4	3	1	49	40	9
18	FW	(England)	Conor McAleny	40	37	3	2	1	1	2	2	0	2	0	2	46	40	6
5	DF	(England)	Carl Piergianni	38	36	2	2	2	0	2	2	0	3	3	0	45	43	2
24	FW	(Republic of the Congo)	Dylan Bahamboula	38	27	11	2	2	0	0	0	0	3	3	0	43	32	11
14	DF	(France)	Dylan Fage	34	22	12	2	2	0	2	2	0	3	2	1	41	28	13
1	GK	(Republic of Ireland)	Ian Lawlor	30	30	0	3	3	0	2	2	0	4	4	0	39	39	0
25	MF	(England)	Alfie McCalmont	35	31	4	3	3	0	0	0	0	1	1	0	39	35	4
8	MF	(England)	Callum Whelan	31	23	8	1	0	1	2	2	0	4	4	0	38	29	9
6	MF	(England)	Ben Garrity	29	21	8	3	3	0	2	2	0	4	0	4	38	26	12
2	DF	(England)	Harry Clarke	32	30	2	3	3	0	0	0	0	0	0	0	35	33	2
3	DF	(England)	Cameron Borthwick-Jackson	31	25	6	2	2	0	2	2	0	0	0	0	35	29	6
11	FW	(England)	Bobby Grant	23	18	5	1	1	0	2	1	1	3	3	0	29	23	6
16	MF	(Belgium)	Brice Ntambwe	24	19	5	3	3	0	0	0	0	1	1	0	28	23	5
15	DF	(England)	Kyle Jameson	25	20	5	1	1	0	0	0	0	1	0	1	27	21	6
4	DF	(Portugal)	Sido Jombati	19	16	3	1	0	1	2	2	0	4	4	0	26	22	4
17	MF	(England)	Jordan Barnett	17	7	10	3	1	2	1	0	1	3	3	0	24	11	13
23	MF	(Wales)	Nicky Adams	23	20	3	0	0	0	0	0	0	0	0	0	23	20	3
9	FW	(England)	Danny Rowe	14	9	5	2	2	0	1	0	1	4	4	0	21	15	6
21	MF	(Germany)	Marcel Hilßner	20	15	5	0	0	0	0	0	0	0	0	0	20	15	5
20	DF	(Italy)	Andrea Badan	18	11	7	0	0	0	1	1	0	1	1	0	20	13	7
22	DF	(France)	Raphaël Diarra	16	10	6	1	1	0	0	0	0	2	2	0	19	13	6
19	FW	(England)	Zak Dearnley	15	6	9	1	0	1	2	1	1	1	0	1	19	7	12
34	DF	(England)	Tom Hamer	12	11	1	1	1	0	2	2	0	3	3	0	18	17	1
7	FW	(Australia)	George Blackwood	13	6	7	0	0	0	0	0	0	2	1	1	15	7	8
37	GK	(England)	Laurie Walker	13	13	0	0	0	0	0	0	0	0	0	0	13	13	0
17	MF	(Azerbaijan)	Serhat Tasdemir	7	4	3	0	0	0	0	0	0	0	0	0	7	4	3
26	FW	(England)	Marcus Barnes	7	1	6	0	0	0	0	0	0	0	0	0	7	1	6
34	MF	(Republic of Ireland)	Harry Vaughan	6	0	6	0	0	0	0	0	0	0	0	0	6	0	6
33	GK	(England)	Laurence Bilboe	3	3	0	0	0	0	0	0	0	0	0	0	3	3	0
29	FW	(England)	Junior Luamba	2	1	1	0	0	0	0	0	0	0	0	0	2	1	1
32	DF	(England)	Will Sutton	1	0	1	0	0	0	0	0	0	1	1	0	2	1	1
27	FW	(England)	Vani Da Silva	0	0	0	0	0	0	1	0	1	1	0	1	2	0	2
28	MF	(England)	Ben Hough	0	0	0	0	0	0	0	0	0	1	1	0	1	1	0
30	GK	(England)	MacKenzie Chapman	1	0	1	0	0	0	0	0	0	0	0	0	1	0	1
Total				46			3			2			4			55		

=== Goals ===
No.	Pos.	Nat.	Player	League Two	FA Cup	EFL Cup	EFL Trophy	Total
18	FW	(England)	Conor McAleny	17	1	1	2	21
10	MF	(England)	Davis Keillor-Dunn	10	0	0	1	11
25	MF	(England)	Alfie McCalmont	8	0	0	2	10
9	FW	(England)	Danny Rowe	4	2	0	2	8
24	FW	(Republic of the Congo)	Dylan Bahamboula	6	1	0	0	7
19	FW	(England)	Zak Dearnley	6	0	0	1	7
11	FW	(England)	Bobby Grant	3	1	1	2	7
5	DF	(England)	Carl Piergianni	5	0	0	0	5
6	MF	(England)	Ben Garrity	2	1	1	0	4
7	FW	(Australia)	George Blackwood	3	0	0	0	3
15	DF	(England)	Kyle Jameson	2	0	0	0	2
3	DF	(England)	Cameron Borthwick-Jackson	2	0	0	0	2
2	DF	(England)	Harry Clarke	1	0	0	0	1
14	DF	(France)	Dylan Fage	1	0	0	0	1
21	MF	(Germany)	Marcel Hilßner	1	0	0	0	1
			Own Goal	1	0	0	0	1
Total				72	6	3	10	91
