= 2018–19 Manchester United F.C. season =

English football club season

Manchester United
2018–19 season
- Co-chairmen: Joel and Avram Glazer
- Manager: José Mourinho (until 18 December); Ole Gunnar Solskjær (from 19 December as caretaker; from 28 March as permanent manager)
- Stadium: Old Trafford
- Premier League: 6th
- FA Cup: Quarter-finals
- EFL Cup: Third round
- UEFA Champions League: Quarter-finals
- Top goalscorer: League: Paul Pogba (13); All: Paul Pogba (16)
- Highest home attendance: 74,556 (vs. Bournemouth, 30 December)
- Lowest home attendance: 55,227 (vs. Derby County, 25 September)
- Average home league attendance: 74,498
Home colours	Away colours	Third colours

The 2018–19 season was Manchester United's 27th season in the Premier League and their 44th consecutive season in the top flight of English football. The season was the first since 2005–06 without club captain Michael Carrick, who retired after the 2017–18 season and joined the club's coaching staff. Assistant manager Rui Faria left the club at the conclusion of that season, with Carrick and Kieran McKenna replacing him as the club's first-team coaches.

A disappointing Premier League campaign saw the club finish in sixth place. United were also eliminated early in the EFL Cup, losing on penalties to Championship side Derby County in the third round. The club reached the quarter-final stage of both the FA Cup and the UEFA Champions League, but were eliminated by Wolverhampton Wanderers and Barcelona respectively. This resulted in United's first consecutive trophyless seasons in 30 years. On 5 May 2019, following a draw at bottom-placed Huddersfield Town, United confirmed their place in the 2019–20 UEFA Europa League, making it the fourth time they had finished outside of the top four in the league since 2014.

On 18 December 2018, with just seven wins in the first 17 league games, manager José Mourinho was sacked. His last game, two days earlier, ended in a 3–1 defeat to Liverpool. The following day, former United striker Ole Gunnar Solskjær was appointed as caretaker manager until the end of the season, assisted by former coach Mike Phelan, who had left the club in 2013 following the retirement of Sir Alex Ferguson. On 28 March 2019, Solskjær became full-time manager.

== Pre-season and friendlies ==
United preceded their 2018–19 campaign with a tour of the United States. The first three games were announced on 3 April 2018, with the opposition provided by Club América, San Jose Earthquakes and Liverpool. The club later announced that the tour would see them compete in the International Champions Cup. In the 2018 competition, United played against Milan at the StubHub Center in Carson, California, Liverpool at the Michigan Stadium in Ann Arbor, Michigan, and Real Madrid at the Hard Rock Stadium in Miami Gardens, Florida. Alexis Sánchez's arrival in the United States was delayed as he was not issued with a visa due to the 16-month suspended jail sentence he accepted in February for tax fraud during his time in Spain. The final pre-season game saw Manchester United play away to Bayern Munich at the Allianz Arena on 5 August.

Date	Opponents	H/A	Result F–A	Scorers	Attendance	Ref.
19 July 2018	Club América	N	1–1	Mata 78'	37,766	
22 July 2018	San Jose Earthquakes	N	0–0		32,549	
25 July 2018	Milan	N	1–1 (9–8p)	Sánchez 12'	21,742	
28 July 2018	Liverpool	N	1–4	A. Pereira 31'	101,254	
31 July 2018	Real Madrid	N	2–1	Sánchez 18', Herrera 27'	64,141	
5 August 2018	Bayern Munich	A	0–1		75,000	

== Premier League ==
=== Matches ===
The Premier League announced the fixtures for the 2018–19 season on 14 June 2018.

Date	Opponents	H / A	Result F–A	Scorers	Attendance	League position	Ref.
10 August 2018	Leicester City	H	2–1	Pogba 3' (pen.), Shaw 83'	74,439	7th	
19 August 2018	Brighton & Hove Albion	A	2–3	Lukaku 34', Pogba 90+5' (pen.)	30,592	9th	
27 August 2018	Tottenham Hotspur	H	0–3		74,400	13th	
2 September 2018	Burnley	A	2–0	Lukaku (2) 27', 44'	21,525	10th	
15 September 2018	Watford	A	2–1	Lukaku 35', Smalling 38'	20,537	8th	
22 September 2018	Wolverhampton Wanderers	H	1–1	Fred 18'	74,489	7th	
29 September 2018	West Ham United	A	1–3	Rashford 71'	56,938	10th	
6 October 2018	Newcastle United	H	3–2	Mata 70', Martial 76', Sánchez 90'	74,519	8th	
20 October 2018	Chelsea	A	2–2	Martial (2) 55', 73'	40,721	10th	
28 October 2018	Everton	H	2–1	Pogba 27', Martial 49'	74,525	8th	
3 November 2018	Bournemouth	A	2–1	Martial 35', Rashford 90+2'	10,792	7th	
11 November 2018	Manchester City	A	1–3	Martial 58' (pen.)	54,316	8th	
24 November 2018	Crystal Palace	H	0–0		74,516	7th	
1 December 2018	Southampton	A	2–2	Lukaku 33', Herrera 39'	30,187	7th	
5 December 2018	Arsenal	H	2–2	Martial 30', Lingard 69'	74,507	8th	
8 December 2018	Fulham	H	4–1	Young 13', Mata 28', Lukaku 42', Rashford 82'	74,523	6th	
16 December 2018	Liverpool	A	1–3	Lingard 33'	52,908	6th	
22 December 2018	Cardiff City	A	5–1	Rashford 3', Herrera 29', Martial 41', Lingard (2) 57' (pen.), 90'	33,028	6th	
26 December 2018	Huddersfield Town	H	3–1	Matić 28', Pogba (2) 64', 78'	74,523	6th	
30 December 2018	Bournemouth	H	4–1	Pogba (2) 5', 33', Rashford 45', Lukaku 72'	74,556	6th	
2 January 2019	Newcastle United	A	2–0	Lukaku 64', Rashford 80'	52,217	6th	
13 January 2019	Tottenham Hotspur	A	1–0	Rashford 44'	80,062	6th	
19 January 2019	Brighton & Hove Albion	H	2–1	Pogba 27' (pen.), Rashford 42'	74,532	6th	
29 January 2019	Burnley	H	2–2	Pogba 87' (pen.), Lindelöf 90+2'	74,529	6th	
3 February 2019	Leicester City	A	1–0	Rashford 9'	32,148	5th	
9 February 2019	Fulham	A	3–0	Pogba (2) 14', 65' (pen.), Martial 23'	25,001	4th	
24 February 2019	Liverpool	H	0–0		74,519	5th	
27 February 2019	Crystal Palace	A	3–1	Lukaku (2) 33', 52', Young 83'	25,754	5th	
2 March 2019	Southampton	H	3–2	A. Pereira 53', Lukaku (2) 59', 88'	74,459	4th	
10 March 2019	Arsenal	A	0–2		60,000	5th	
30 March 2019	Watford	H	2–1	Rashford 28', Martial 72'	74,543	5th	
2 April 2019	Wolverhampton Wanderers	A	1–2	McTominay 13'	31,302	6th	
13 April 2019	West Ham United	H	2–1	Pogba (2) 19' (pen.), 80' (pen.)	74,478	6th	
21 April 2019	Everton	A	0–4		39,395	6th	
24 April 2019	Manchester City	H	0–2		74,431	6th	
28 April 2019	Chelsea	H	1–1	Mata 11'	74,526	6th	
5 May 2019	Huddersfield Town	A	1–1	McTominay 8'	24,263	6th	
12 May 2019	Cardiff City	H	0–2		74,457	6th	

=== League table ===
Pos	Team	Pld	W	D	L	GF	GA	GD	Pts	Qualification or relegation
4	Tottenham Hotspur	38	23	2	13	67	39	+28	71	Qualification to Champions League group stage
5	Arsenal	38	21	7	10	73	51	+22	70	Qualification to Europa League group stage (Note: Since the winners of the EFL Cup and the FA Cup, Manchester City, qualified for the Champions League, the spot given to the FA Cup winners (Europa League group stage) was passed to the sixth-placed team and the spot given to the League Cup winners (Europa League second qualifying round) was passed to the seventh-placed team.)
6	Manchester United	38	19	9	10	65	54	+11	66	Qualification to Europa League group stage
7	Wolverhampton Wanderers	38	16	9	13	47	46	+1	57	Qualification to Europa League second qualifying round
8	Everton	38	15	9	14	54	46	+8	54	

Source: Premier League
Rules for classification: 1) Points; 2) Goal difference; 3) Goals scored; 4) Play-offs (only if needed to decide champion, teams for relegation or teams for UEFA competitions).

== FA Cup ==
As one of the 20 teams in the Premier League, Manchester United entered the FA Cup in the Third Round. The draw was made on 3 December 2018 and paired United with Reading, whom they had faced at the same stage two seasons earlier, when they won 4–0. United won the match 2–0; Juan Mata opened the scoring from the penalty spot after the video assistant referee ruled that Omar Richards had tripped Juan Mata in the penalty area, and another goal from Romelu Lukaku. 19-year-old winger Tahith Chong made his FA Cup debut, replacing Juan Mata in the 62nd minute. The draw for the Fourth Round was made on 7 January 2019 and United were drawn away to Arsenal; the last time the two sides had met in the FA Cup was in the Sixth Round of the 2014–15 season, when Arsenal won 2–1 at Old Trafford. This time Manchester United won 3–1; two goals in two minutes from former Arsenal forward Alexis Sánchez and Jesse Lingard put United 2–0 up with just over half an hour played, but Pierre-Emerick Aubameyang got one back for the Gunners shortly before half-time. Anthony Martial then came off the bench to seal the win for United with their third goal in the 82nd minute. The draw for the Fifth Round was made on 28 January 2019 and United were drawn away to Chelsea, whom they had faced in the final the previous season. Goals from Paul Pogba and Ander Herrera before half-time sealed a 2–0 win for United. They were then drawn away to Wolverhampton Wanderers in the quarter-finals. Goals from Raúl Jiménez and Diogo Jota gave Wolves a 2–1 win and a place in the semi-finals, with Marcus Rashford scoring a consolation goal for United in the 95th minute.

Date	Round	Opponents	H / A	Result F–A	Scorers	Attendance	Ref.
5 January 2019	Round 3	Reading	H	2–0	Mata 22' (pen.), Lukaku 45+4'	73,918	
25 January 2019	Round 4	Arsenal	A	3–1	Sánchez 31', Lingard 33', Martial 82'	59,571	
18 February 2019	Round 5	Chelsea	A	2–0	Herrera 31', Pogba 45'	40,562	
16 March 2019	Quarter-finals	Wolverhampton Wanderers	A	1–2	Rashford 90+5'	31,004	

== EFL Cup ==
The draw for the third round of the EFL Cup was made on 30 August 2018, with Manchester United drawn at home to Derby County. United took the lead just three minutes in through Juan Mata, but an equaliser from Harry Wilson was followed by a red card for United keeper Romero. Marriot gave Derby the lead with five minutes to go, but Marouane Fellaini's stoppage-time strike ensured penalties; however Derby won 8-7 on spot kicks.

Date	Round	Opponents	H / A	Result F–A	Scorers	Attendance	Ref.
25 September 2018	Round 3	Derby County	H	2–2 (7–8p)	Mata 3', Fellaini 90+5'	55,227	

== UEFA Champions League ==
=== Group stage ===
The draw for the group stage of the 2018–19 UEFA Champions League was made in Monaco on 30 August 2018.

Date	Opponents	H / A	Result F–A	Scorers	Attendance	Group position	Ref.
19 September 2018	Young Boys	A	3–0	Pogba 35', 44' (pen.), Martial 66'	31,120	1st	
2 October 2018	Valencia	H	0–0		73,569	2nd	
23 October 2018	Juventus	H	0–1		73,946	2nd	
7 November 2018	Juventus	A	2–1	Mata 86', Bonucci 90' (o.g.)	41,470	2nd	
27 November 2018	Young Boys	H	1–0	Fellaini 90+1'	72,876	2nd	
12 December 2018	Valencia	A	1–2	Rashford 87'	36,544	2nd	

Pos	Team	Pld	W	D	L	GF	GA	GD	Pts	Qualification
1	(Italy) Juventus	6	4	0	2	9	4	+5	12	Advance to knockout phase
2	(England) Manchester United	6	3	1	2	7	4	+3	10	Advance to knockout phase
3	(Spain) Valencia	6	2	2	2	6	6	0	8	Transfer to Europa League
4	(Switzerland) Young Boys	6	1	1	4	4	12	−8	4	

Source: UEFA

=== Knockout phase ===
The draw for the round of 16 was held on 17 December 2018, 12:00 CET, at the UEFA headquarters in Nyon, Switzerland. After finishing second in their group and progressing to the round of 16, United were drawn against French champions Paris Saint-Germain in the first competitive meeting between the two sides. In the first leg at Old Trafford, goals from Presnel Kimpembe and Kylian Mbappé gave PSG a 2–0 lead to take back to the Parc des Princes. Needing to score three times to progress, Romelu Lukaku opened the scoring for United in the second minute of the second leg, before Juan Bernat restored PSG's two-goal aggregate lead less than 10 minutes later. Lukaku then scored again after half an hour, to bring United within a goal of the quarter-finals. Former Manchester United midfielder Ángel Di María had the ball in the back of the net early in the second half, only for the goal to be ruled out for offside, and Bernat hit the post late on after Mbappé had rounded David de Gea. In the 90th minute, referee Damir Skomina awarded United a penalty after using a VAR review to adjudge Kimpembe to have handled the ball in the penalty area. Marcus Rashford scored the spot-kick to make it 3–3 on aggregate and send United through to the quarter-finals on the away goals rule; this made them the first team in Champions League history to progress after losing by at least two goals at home in the first leg. Solskjær gave 17-year-old forward Mason Greenwood and 19-year-old winger Tahith Chong their European debuts, the former also playing his first senior game.

The draw for the quarter-finals was held on 15 March 2019, with United paired with Barcelona. Both United and Manchester City were originally drawn to play their home legs in the same week; as United finished lower in the league the previous season, their tie was reversed. The first leg was played at Old Trafford on 10 April 2019. Barcelona won 1–0 thanks to an own goal by Luke Shaw that was originally ruled out for offside; the decision was later overturned after a VAR review. The second leg was played at Camp Nou on 16 April, with two goals from Lionel Messi and another from former Liverpool forward Philippe Coutinho giving the Spanish side a 3–0 win on the night, 4–0 on aggregate.

Date	Round	Opponents	H / A	Result F–A	Scorers	Attendance	Ref.
12 February 2019	Round of 16; First leg	Paris Saint-Germain	H	0–2		74,054	
6 March 2019	Round of 16; Second leg	Paris Saint-Germain	A	3–1	Lukaku (2) 2', 30', Rashford 90+4' (pen.)	47,441	
10 April 2019	Quarter-finals; First leg	Barcelona	H	0–1		74,093	
16 April 2019	Quarter-finals; Second leg	Barcelona	A	0–3		96,708	

== Squad statistics ==
No.	Pos.	Name	League		FA Cup		League Cup		Europe		Total		Discipline	
No.	Pos.	Name	Apps	Goals	Apps	Goals	Apps	Goals	Apps	Goals	Apps	Goals	Yellow card	Red card
1	GK	(Spain) David de Gea	38	0	0	0	0	0	9	0	47	0	1	0
2	DF	(Sweden) Victor Lindelöf	29(1)	1	3	0	0	0	7	0	39(1)	1	3	0
3	DF	(Ivory Coast) Eric Bailly	8(4)	0	1	0	1	0	4	0	14(4)	0	1	1
4	DF	(England) Phil Jones	15(3)	0	1(1)	0	1	0	3	0	20(4)	0	1	0
6	MF	(France) Paul Pogba	34(1)	13	3	1	0	0	8(1)	2	45(2)	16	7	1
7	FW	(Chile) Alexis Sánchez	9(11)	1	2(1)	1	0	0	2(2)	0	13(14)	2	3	0
8	MF	(Spain) Juan Mata	16(6)	3	2(1)	1	1	1	2(4)	1	21(11)	6	3	0
9	FW	(Belgium) Romelu Lukaku	22(10)	12	3	1	1	0	6(3)	2	32(13)	15	5	0
10	FW	(England) Marcus Rashford	26(7)	10	2(2)	1	0	0	8(2)	2	36(11)	13	6	1
11	FW	(France) Anthony Martial	18(9)	10	1(1)	1	1	0	6(2)	1	26(12)	12	3	0
12	DF	(England) Chris Smalling	24	1	2	0	0	0	8	0	34	1	2	0
13	GK	(England) Lee Grant	0	0	0	0	0(1)	0	0	0	0(1)	0	0	0
14	MF	(England) Jesse Lingard	19(8)	4	2	1	1	0	4(2)	0	26(10)	5	6	0
15	MF	(Brazil) Andreas Pereira	6(9)	1	1(2)	0	0	0	2(2)	0	9(13)	1	5	0
16	DF	(Argentina) Marcos Rojo	2(3)	0	0	0	0	0	1	0	3(3)	0	2	0
17	MF	(Brazil) Fred	13(4)	1	1	0	0(1)	0	6	0	20(5)	1	3	0
18	DF	(England) Ashley Young	28(2)	2	3	0	1	0	6(1)	0	38(3)	2	13	1
20	DF	(Portugal) Diogo Dalot	12(4)	0	2	0	1	0	2(2)	0	17(6)	0	4	0
21	MF	(Spain) Ander Herrera	16(6)	2	3	1	1	0	2	0	22(6)	3	7	0
22	GK	(Argentina) Sergio Romero	0	0	4	0	1	0	1	0	6	0	0	1
23	DF	(England) Luke Shaw	29	1	3	0	0	0	8	0	40	1	14	0
24	DF	(Netherlands) Timothy Fosu-Mensah	0	0	0	0	0	0	0	0	0	0	0	0
25	DF	(Ecuador) Antonio Valencia (C)	5(1)	0	0	0	0	0	3	0	8(1)	0	4	0
27	MF	(Belgium) Marouane Fellaini	6(8)	0	0(1)	0	0(1)	1	3(2)	1	9(12)	2	1	0
31	MF	(Serbia) Nemanja Matić	28	1	3	0	1	0	6	0	38	1	12	1
36	DF	(Italy) Matteo Darmian	5(1)	0	1	0	0	0	0	0	6(1)	0	0	0
37	MF	(England) James Garner	0(1)	0	0	0	0	0	0	0	0(1)	0	0	0
38	DF	(England) Axel Tuanzebe	0	0	0	0	0	0	0	0	0	0	0	0
39	MF	(Scotland) Scott McTominay	9(7)	2	1(2)	0	0	0	3	0	13(9)	2	1	0
40	GK	(Portugal) Joel Castro Pereira	0	0	0	0	0	0	0	0	0	0	0	0
44	FW	(Netherlands) Tahith Chong	0(2)	0	0(1)	0	0	0	0(1)	0	0(4)	0	1	0
45	GK	(Republic of Ireland) Kieran O'Hara	0	0	0	0	0	0	0	0	0	0	0	0
46	FW	(England) Joshua Bohui	0	0	0	0	0	0	0	0	0	0	0	0
47	MF	(England) Angel Gomes	0(2)	0	0	0	0	0	0	0	0(2)	0	0	0
48	MF	(Scotland) Ethan Hamilton	0	0	0	0	0	0	0	0	0	0	0	0
51	GK	(Czech Republic) Matěj Kovář	0	0	0	0	0	0	0	0	0	0	0	0
53	DF	(England) Brandon Williams	0	0	0	0	0	0	0	0	0	0	0	0
54	FW	(England) Mason Greenwood	1(2)	0	0	0	0	0	0(1)	0	1(3)	0	0	0
59	DF	(Republic of Ireland) Lee O'Connor	0	0	0	0	0	0	0	0	0	0	0	0
Own goals			—	0	—	0	—	0	—	1	—	1	—	—

Statistics accurate as of 12 May 2019.

== Transfers ==
=== In ===
Date	Pos.	Name	From	Fee	Ref.
1 July 2018 (Note: Deal agreed 6 June 2018)	DF	(Portugal) Diogo Dalot	(Portugal) Porto	Undisclosed (Note: Fee reported as £19 million)	
1 July 2018 (Note: Deal agreed 21 June 2018)	MF	(Brazil) Fred	(Ukraine) Shakhtar Donetsk	Undisclosed (Note: Fee reported as £47 million)	
3 July 2018	GK	(England) Lee Grant	(England) Stoke City	Undisclosed (Note: Fee reported as £1.5 million)	
28 November 2018	GK	(England) Paul Woolston	(England) Newcastle United	Free	

=== Out ===
Date	Pos.	Name	To	Fee	Ref.
15 June 2018	MF	(Belgium) Indy Boonen	(Belgium) KV Oostende	Free	
30 June 2018	MF	(England) Michael Carrick	Retired		
30 June 2018	GK	(England) Max Johnstone	Released (Note: Joined Sunderland on 26 July 2018)		
30 June 2018	MF	(Nigeria) Tosin Kehinde	Released (Note: Joined Feirense on 1 August 2018)		
30 June 2018	DF	(England) Jake Kenyon	Released		
30 June 2018	GK	(Belgium) Ilias Moutha-Sebtaoui	Released (Note: Joined Anderlecht on 1 July 2018)		
30 June 2018	MF	(England) Devonte Redmond	Released (Note: Joined Salford City on 31 January 2019.)		
30 June 2018	GK	(England) Theo Richardson	Released (Note: Joined Grantham Town on 31 August 2018.)		
30 June 2018	DF	(England) Joe Riley	Released (Note: Joined Bradford City on 1 July 2018)		
30 June 2018	MF	(England) Charlie Scott	Released (Note: Joined Altrincham on 2 November 2018.)		
3 July 2018	GK	(England) Sam Johnstone	(England) West Bromwich Albion	Undisclosed (Note: Fee reported as £6.5 million)	
17 July 2018	DF	(Netherlands) Daley Blind	(Netherlands) Ajax	€16 million (Note: Rising to €20.5 million if all additional clauses met)	
30 January 2019	DF	(England) Ro-Shaun Williams	(England) Shrewsbury Town	Undisclosed	
1 February 2019	MF	(Belgium) Marouane Fellaini	(China) Shandong Luneng Taishan	Undisclosed	

=== Loan out ===
Date from	Date to	Pos.	Name	To	Ref.
1 July 2018	End of season	GK	(England) Dean Henderson	(England) Sheffield United	
27 July 2018	21 December 2018	MF	(England) Matty Willock	(Scotland) St Mirren	
28 July 2018	End of season	DF	(England) Cameron Borthwick-Jackson	(England) Scunthorpe United	
2 August 2018	9 January 2019	GK	(Portugal) Joel Castro Pereira	(Portugal) Vitória de Setúbal	
6 August 2018	End of season	DF	(England) Axel Tuanzebe	(England) Aston Villa	
9 August 2018	End of season	DF	(Netherlands) Timothy Fosu-Mensah	(England) Fulham	
13 August 2018	End of season	FW	(England) James Wilson	(Scotland) Aberdeen	
15 August 2018	End of season	GK	(Republic of Ireland) Kieran O'Hara	(England) Macclesfield Town	
28 August 2018	End of season	DF	(England) Demetri Mitchell	(Scotland) Heart of Midlothian	
11 January 2019	End of season	MF	(Scotland) Ethan Hamilton	(England) Rochdale	
18 January 2019	End of season	DF	(Wales) Regan Poole	(Wales) Newport County	
31 January 2019	End of season	MF	(England) Zak Dearnley	(England) Oldham Athletic	
31 January 2019	End of season	GK	(Portugal) Joel Castro Pereira	(Belgium) Kortrijk	
31 January 2019	End of season	MF	(England) Tom Sang	(England) AFC Fylde	
31 January 2019	End of season	MF	(England) Callum Whelan	(England) Port Vale	
31 January 2019	End of season	MF	(England) Matty Willock	(England) Crawley Town	
