= Harry Clarke (footballer, born 2001) =

English footballer

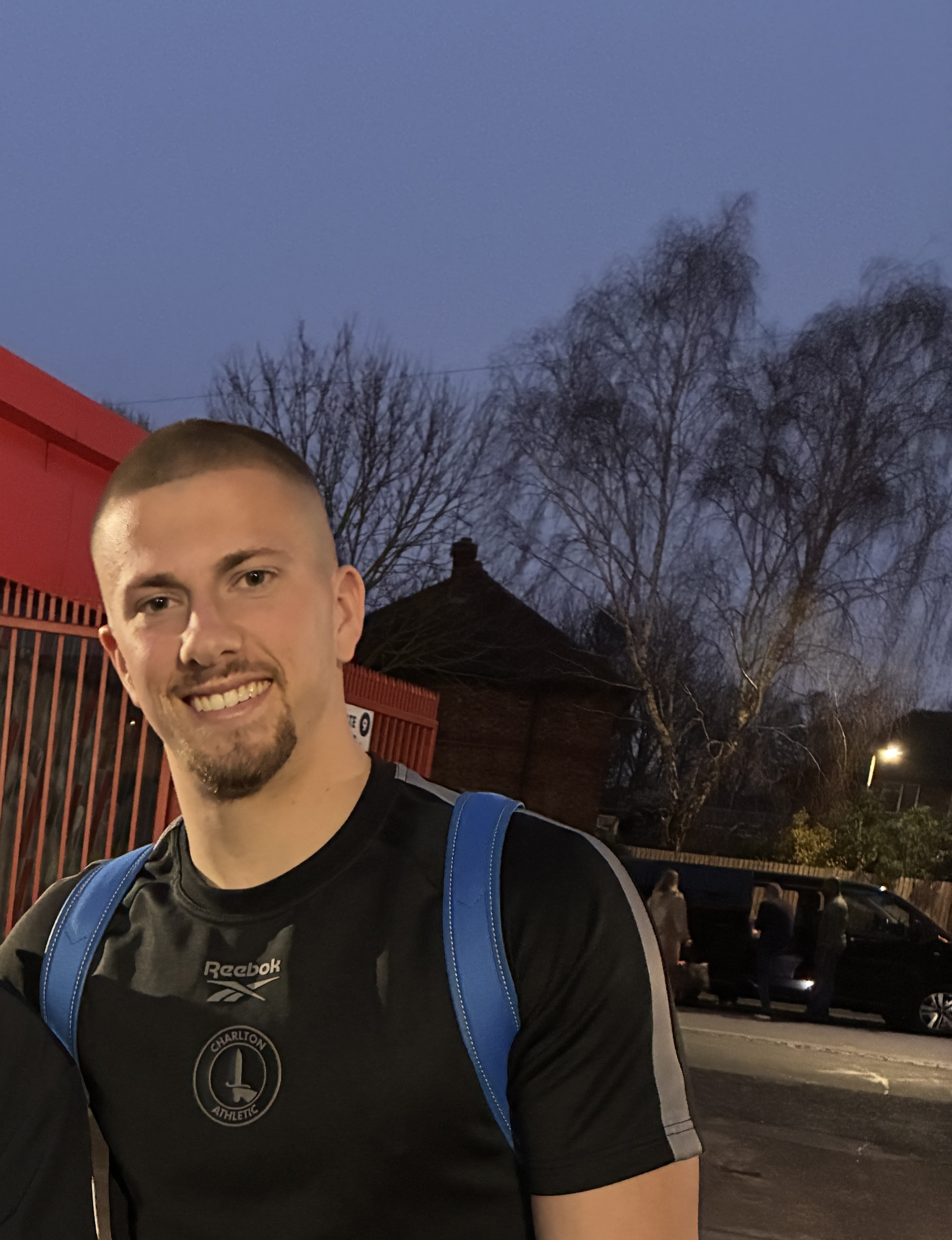
- Clarke playing for Charlton Athletic in 2026

Personal information
- Full name: Harrison Thomas Clarke
- Date of birth: 2 March 2001 (age 25)
- Place of birth: Ipswich, England
- Height: 5 ft 11 in (1.80 m)
- Position: Right-back

Team information
- Current team: Preston North End
- Number: 4

Youth career
- Brantham Athletic
- Ipswich Town
- 2015–2020: Arsenal

Senior career*
Years	Team	Apps	(Gls)
2020–2023	Arsenal	0	(0)
2020–2021	→ Oldham Athletic (loan)	32	(1)
2021–2022	→ Ross County (loan)	17	(3)
2022	→ Hibernian (loan)	7	(1)
2022–2023	→ Stoke City (loan)	18	(2)
2023–2026	Ipswich Town	62	(1)
2025	→ Sheffield United (loan)	6	(0)
2026	→ Charlton Athletic (loan)	19	(0)
2026–	Preston North End	7	(0)

International career
2017	England U17	2	(0)
- * Club domestic league appearances and goals as of 12:20, 11 October 2026 (UTC)

Harrison Thomas Clarke (born 2 March 2001) is an English professional footballer who plays as a right-back for EFL Championship club Preston North End.

== Club career ==
=== Early career ===
Born in Ipswich, Clarke began his career with Ipswich Town, having been scouted at Brantham Athletic.

=== Arsenal ===
He joined Arsenal as a youth player in 2015. In August 2018, he signed his first professional contract, which was renewed in December 2019.

In October 2020, Clarke joined Oldham Athletic on loan until January 2021. On 20 October 2020, he came off the bench in the 85th minute and made his debut in a 1–1 draw against Carlisle United in League Two. On 3 November, he scored his first competitive goal in a 2–1 victory over Cheltenham Town in the league. On 22 January 2021, the loan was extended for the remainder of the 2020–21 season.

On 2 August 2021, Clarke was loaned to Scottish Premiership side Ross County for the 2021–22 season. The loan came to an end on 3 January 2022.

On 6 January 2022, Clarke was loaned to Scottish Premiership side Hibernian. Clarke missed several weeks due to injury, and made his debut (and scored) on 2 April in a 1–1 draw with Dundee United. The loan had been due to run for 18 months, but Arsenal exercised a break clause in the deal during June 2022.

On 20 June 2022, Clarke joined Stoke City on loan for the 2022–23 season. Clarke made 20 appearances for Stoke, scoring twice against Blackpool and Burnley before being recalled by Arsenal in January 2023.

=== Ipswich Town ===
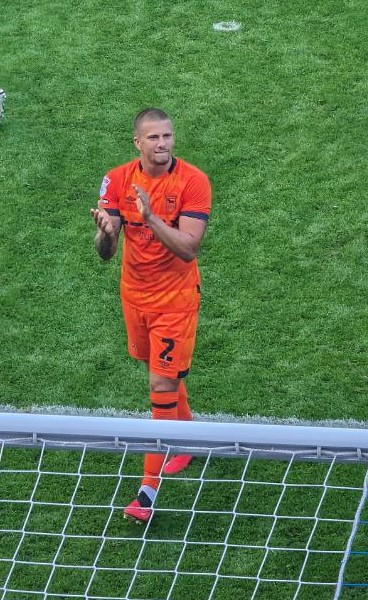
Clarke playing for Ipswich Town in 2023.

In January 2023, Clarke joined Ipswich Town for an undisclosed fee. He had previously played for the club at youth level, prior to joining Arsenal's academy in 2015.

During Ipswich's 4–3 loss to Brentford in October 2024, Clarke became only the second player since Jan Bednarek in February 2021 in Premier League history to score an own goal, concede a penalty and receive a red card in the same game. The own goal was later overturned and awarded to Yoane Wissa.

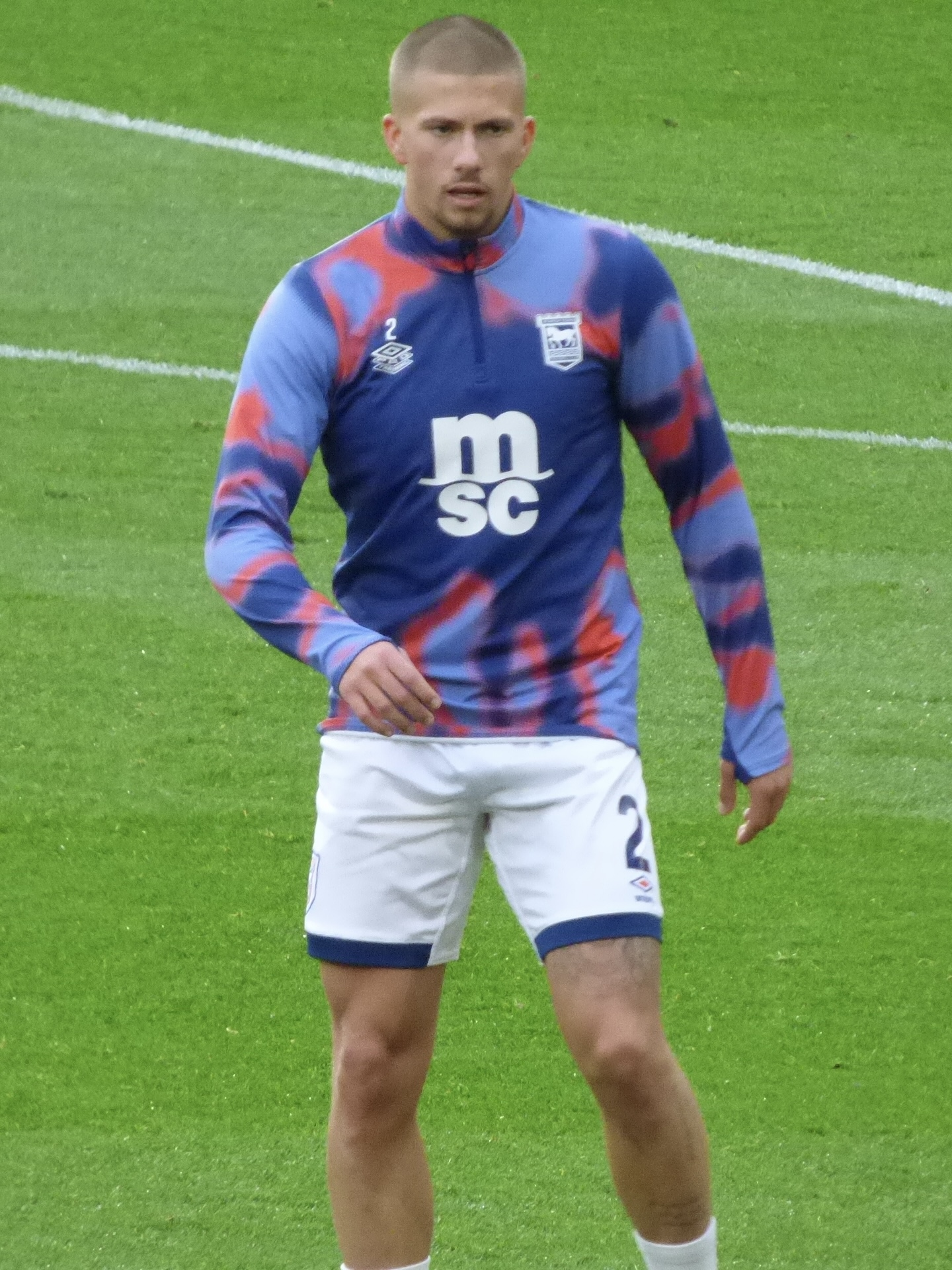
Clarke playing for Ipswich Town in 2024.

On 29 January 2025, Clarke joined Championship club Sheffield United on loan for the remainder of the season.

On 12 January 2026, Clarke joined Championship club Charlton Athletic on loan for the remainder of the season.

=== Preston North End ===
He signed for Preston North End in August 2026.

== International career ==
Clarke has represented England at under-17 youth level.

== Playing style ==
Clarke began his career as a midfielder but was converted to a defender when he joined Arsenal in 2015. Arsenal described Clarke as "capable of playing as a right back or as a central defender" who "has taken his qualities as a midfielder into defence, looking to play the ball forwards whenever possible".

== Personal life ==
In May 2026 he became engaged to reality TV contestant Georgia Steel.

== Career statistics ==
As of match played 10 October 2026

Appearances and goals by club, season and competition
Club	Season	League			National cup (Note: Includes FA Cup, Scottish Cup)		League cup (Note: Includes EFL Cup)		Other		Total	
Club	Season	Division	Apps	Goals	Apps	Goals	Apps	Goals	Apps	Goals	Apps	Goals
Arsenal U21	2019–20	—			—		—		2 (Note: Appearance(s) in the EFL Trophy.)	0	2	0
Arsenal U21	2020–21	—			—		—		1	0	1	0
Arsenal U21	Total		—		—		—		3	0	3	0
Arsenal	2020–21	Premier League	0	0	0	0	0	0	0	0	0	0
Arsenal	2021–22	Premier League	0	0	0	0	0	0	0	0	0	0
Arsenal	2022–23	Premier League	0	0	0	0	0	0	0	0	0	0
Arsenal	Total		0	0	0	0	0	0	0	0	0	0
Oldham Athletic (loan)	2020–21	League Two	32	1	3	0	0	0	0	0	35	1
Ross County (loan)	2021–22	Scottish Premiership	17	3	0	0	0	0	—		17	3
Hibernian (loan)	2021–22	Scottish Premiership	7	1	1	0	0	0	—		8	1
Stoke City (loan)	2022–23	Championship	18	2	1	0	1	0	—		20	2
Ipswich Town	2022–23	League One	20	0	0	0	0	0	0	0	20	0
Ipswich Town	2023–24	Championship	35	1	1	0	3	0	—		39	1
Ipswich Town	2024–25	Premier League	7	0	1	0	0	0	—		8	0
Ipswich Town	2025–26	Championship	0	0	0	0	0	0	—		0	0
Ipswich Town	Total		62	1	2	0	3	0	0	0	67	1
Sheffield United (loan)	2024–25	Championship	6	0	—		—		0	0	6	0
Charlton Athletic (loan)	2025–26	Championship	19	0	—		—		—		19	0
Preston North End	2026–27	Championship	7	0	0	0	1	0	0	0	8	0
Career total			168	8	7	0	5	0	3	0	183	8

== Honours ==
Ipswich Town

- EFL League One runner-up: 2022–23
- EFL Championship runner-up: 2023–24
