= Zak Dearnley =

English footballer (born 1998)

Personal information
- Full name: Zachary Harry Dearnley
- Date of birth: 28 September 1998 (age 28)
- Place of birth: Sheffield, England
- Height: 5 ft 9 in (1.75 m)
- Position: Winger

Youth career
- Manchester United

Senior career*
Years	Team	Apps	(Gls)
2018–2019	Manchester United	0	(0)
2019	→ Oldham Athletic (loan)	9	(1)
2019	New Mills	1	(0)
2020–2022	Oldham Athletic	35	(10)
2022	Halifax Town	13	(3)
2022	Buxton		
2022	Liversedge	10	(2)
2022–2023	Guiseley	0	(0)
2023	Stocksbridge Park Steels	1	(0)
2023	Ossett United	8	(0)

International career
- England U16
- England Schools U18
- * Club domestic league appearances and goals as of 11:13, 13 October 2024 (UTC)

Zachary Harry Dearnley (born 28 September 1998) is an English professional footballer who plays as a winger.

== Club career ==
=== Early career ===
Born in Sheffield, Dearnley began his career with Manchester United. He was on the substitutes bench in May 2017 for their final day Premier League match with Crystal Palace. During the 2018–19 season under José Mourinho, Dearnley trained with the club's senior squad in the build-up to a UEFA Champions League tie with Juventus.

On 31 January 2019, Dearnley was loaned to EFL League Two side Oldham Athletic. He made his professional debut on 9 February against Crawley Town, scoring Oldham's second goal in a 3–0 victory. Dearnley's loan was terminated on 30 April due to injury after making nine appearances. On 7 June 2019, it was announced that Dearnley would leave United following the expiration of his contract on 30 June. In August, he had a trial with Rotherham United.

On 19 November 2019, Dearnley joined North West Counties Football League Division One South side New Mills. He made his debut later that day against Ellesmere Rangers, his only appearance for the club.

=== Return to Oldham Athletic ===
In January 2020 he returned to Oldham Athletic, signing a permanent contract until the end of the 2019–20 season. In June 2020 he signed a new two-year contract. On 27 January 2022, Dearnley had his contract terminated by mutual consent.

=== Non-league football ===
On 31 January 2022, Dearnley joined National League club FC Halifax Town on a free transfer. After playing for Buxton, he signed for Liversedge in September 2022. On 14 December 2022, Dearnley signed for Northern Premier League Premier Division side Guiseley.

In February 2023 he signed for Stocksbridge Park Steels, and in August 2023 he signed for Ossett United.

== International career ==
Dearnley represented England at U16 and Schools U18 level.

== Career statistics ==
As of 7 December 2021

Appearances and goals by club, season and competition
Club	Season	League			Cup		League Cup		Other		Total	
Club	Season	Division	Apps	Goals	Apps	Goals	Apps	Goals	Apps	Goals	Apps	Goals
Manchester United	2018–19	Premier League	0	0	0	0	0	0	0	0	0	0
Oldham Athletic (loan)	2018–19	League Two	9	1	0	0	0	0	0	0	9	1
New Mills	2019–20	NWCFL Division One South	1	0	0	0	0	0	0	0	1	0
Oldham Athletic	2019–20	League Two	8	4	0	0	0	0	0	0	8	4
Oldham Athletic	2020–21	League Two	15	6	1	0	2	0	1	1	19	7
Oldham Athletic	2021–22	League Two	12	0	1	0	2	0	4	3	19	3
Oldham Athletic	Total		35	10	2	0	4	0	5	4	46	14
Career total			45	11	2	0	4	0	5	4	56	15
