= Jordan Barnett (footballer) =

English footballer (born 1999)

Personal information
- Full name: Jordan Thomas Barnett
- Date of birth: 20 October 1999 (age 27)
- Place of birth: Penistone, England
- Height: 1.78 m (5 ft 10 in)
- Positions: Left back; midfielder

Youth career
- Sheffield Wednesday
- Barnsley

Senior career*
Years	Team	Apps	(Gls)
–2017	Penistone Church		
2017–2018	Burnley	0	(0)
2018–2020	Barnsley	0	(0)
2020	Pontefract Collieries		
2020–2021	Oldham Athletic	18	(0)
2021	Notts County	12	(1)
2021–2022	Yeovil Town	37	(1)
2022–2023	Matlock Town	22	(3)
2023	Buxton	10	(0)
2023	Dorchester Town	13	(2)
- * Club domestic league appearances and goals as of 10:35, 4 November 2023 (UTC)

Jordan Thomas Barnett (born 20 October 1999) is an English professional footballer who plays as a left back and midfielder most recently for Southern League Division One South club Dorchester Town.

Having played youth football for Sheffield Wednesday and Barnsley, Barnett started his senior career at Penistone Church before joining Burnley on a one-year deal in 2017 to play youth football but was released at the end of the season. He returned to Barnsley in 2018, but was released in 2020 without making a first-team appearance. After a short spell with Pontefract Collieries, he joined Oldham Athletic in September 2020 and made his debut for the club later that month.

== Early life ==
Born in Penistone, Barnett attended Penistone Grammar School in Penistone and later Barnsley College in Barnsley.

== Club career ==
After playing academy football for Sheffield Wednesday and Barnsley, being released by the latter at the age of 15. Barnett started his senior career at Penistone Church before signing for Premier League club Burnley on a one-year deal in October 2017. He was released by Burnley at the end of the season.

He returned to Barnsley on a one-year deal in July 2018. His contract was extended by a further year at the end of the season, but Barnett was released at the end of the 2019–20 season following the expiry of his contract.

Barnett signed for Pontefract Collieries in summer 2020, but left to join League Two side Oldham Athletic on 1 September 2020 on a deal until January 2021. Barnett made his debut for Oldham as a substitute in an EFL Cup tie against Carlisle United on 5 September 2020, before making his league debut later that month in a 3–2 defeat at home to Crawley Town.

Following the expiry of his contract at Oldham, he joined Notts County on 1 February 2021 on a deal until the end of the season.

After his release by Notts County, Barnett signed for fellow National League side Yeovil Town. At the end of the 2021–22 season, Barnett was released by Yeovil following the expiry of his contract.

On 5 August 2022, Barnett signed for Northern Premier League Premier Division side Matlock Town. In January 2023, he reunited with former Matlock manager Craig Elliott at National League North club Buxton.

== Career statistics ==
As of 28 October 2023

Appearances and goals by club, season and competition
Club	Season	League			FA Cup		EFL Cup		Other		Total	
Club	Season	Division	Apps	Goals	Apps	Goals	Apps	Goals	Apps	Goals	Apps	Goals
Oldham Athletic	2020–21	League One	17	0	3	0	1	0	3 (Note: Appearances in EFL Trophy)	0	24	0
Notts County	2020–21	National League	12	1	—		—		3 (Note: Two appearances in FA Trophy, one appearance in National League play-offs)	0	15	1
Yeovil Town	2021–22	National League	37	1	4	0	—		5 (Note: Two appearances in FA Trophy, three appearances in Somerset Premier Cup)	0	46	1
Matlock Town	2022–23	NPL Premier Division	22	3	1	0	—		4 (Note: Three appearances, two goals in FA Trophy and one appearance in Derbyshire Senior Cup)	2	27	5
Buxton	2022–23	National League North	10	0	—		—		—		10	0
Dorchester Town	2023–24	Southern League; Premier Division South	13	2	1	0	—		1 (Note: Appearance in FA Trophy)	0	15	2
Career total			111	7	9	0	1	0	16	2	137	9
