= Danny Rowe (footballer, born 1989) =

English footballer

Personal information
- Full name: Daniel Lucas Rowe
- Date of birth: 29 January 1989 (age 37)
- Place of birth: Blackpool, England
- Height: 6 ft 1 in (1.86 m)
- Position: Striker

Team information
- Current team: AFC Fylde (head scout)

Youth career
- –2001: Preston North End
- 2001–2005: Manchester United

Senior career*
Years	Team	Apps	(Gls)
–2010	Blackpool Wren Rovers		
2010	Kendal Town	14	(9)
2010–2013	Fleetwood Town	7	(0)
2011	→ Droylsden (loan)	22	(11)
2012	→ Stockport County (loan)	15	(8)
2012–2013	→ Stockport County (loan)	13	(1)
2013	→ Barrow (loan)	21	(4)
2013–2014	Lincoln City	23	(3)
2014–2020	AFC Fylde	241	(155)
2020–2021	Oldham Athletic	25	(7)
2021	Bradford City	18	(5)
2021–2023	Chesterfield	26	(10)
2022–2023	→ AFC Fylde (loan)	9	(2)
2023	→ York City (loan)	4	(0)
2023	Macclesfield	0	(0)
Total		438	(215)
- * Club domestic league appearances and goals as of 16:40, 1 October 2025 (UTC)

Daniel Lucas Rowe (born 29 January 1989) is an English former professional footballer who played as a striker. He is head scout at AFC Fylde.

Rowe played youth football for Preston North End and Manchester United, later playing for Blackpool Wren Rovers, Kendal Town, Fleetwood Town, Droylsden, Stockport County, Barrow, Lincoln City, AFC Fylde (where he is the all-time leading goalscorer), Oldham Athletic, Bradford City and Chesterfield.

== Career ==
=== Early career ===
Born in Blackpool, Rowe played youth football with Preston North End before joining Manchester United as a 12-year-old in 2001 for a fee determined at tribunal that could potentially have reached a six-figure sum, however, he was released by United aged sixteen. He then began a joinery apprenticeship at a building site in Blackpool. Speaking to Sky Sports in 2020, he said he fell out of love with the sport after his release by United.

He began his senior career in non-league with Blackpool Wren Rovers, where he scored 63 goals in 68 games between August 2008 and August 2010. He also played Sunday league football for Quilligans.

He joined Kendal Town for whom he debuted in the club's 1–0 Northern Premier League at home to Frickley Athletic on 21 August 2010. He moved up two divisions four months later when he joined Fleetwood Town for an undisclosed fee. from whom he spent loan spells at Droylsden, Stockport County, and Barrow moving on to join Lincoln City.

=== AFC Fylde ===
On 8 August 2014, Rowe joined Conference North side AFC Fylde after featuring for the club during pre-season. During his third season at the club, Rowe scored fifty goals in all competitions as Fylde won promotion to the National League, his fiftieth and final goal coming on a final day 4–2 victory over Worcester City, these efforts securing him the league's Player of the Year award, as well as the club's Player of the Season, Goal of the Season, Golden Boot and Players' Player of the Season awards. He also won the Player of the Year award for both the 2017–18 and 2018–19 seasons. Rowe scored the only goal of the game as Fylde defeated Leyton Orient to lift the FA Trophy. He asked to leave Fylde in January 2020, with the club putting him on the transfer list. He later said that he wished to play in the Football League but realise that would not be possible with Fylde. He departed Fylde as their all-time leading goalscorer.

=== Oldham Athletic ===
He moved to Oldham Athletic later that month for an undisclosed fee, signing an 18-month contract. He made his debut for the club on 18 January 2020, coming off of the bench in a 1–1 draw with Carlisle United. He scored his first goal for the club the following week, in his first start for the club. In November 2020, Rowe's 35 yard free kick won the league's goal of the month award.

=== Bradford City ===
In January 2021 he moved to Bradford City, signing an 18-month contract with the club for an undisclosed fee. Interim club manager Conor Sellars described Rowe as "exciting" and said that he could help the club score more goals.

Rowe made his debut for the club on 23 January in a 0–0 draw with Cambridge United, and scored his first goal for the club in a 3–1 victory at Southend United three days later. After 2 goals in 3 games he was ruled out due to a heavy cold.

=== Chesterfield ===
On 22 April 2021 he moved to Chesterfield after spending 3 months with Bradford City. Bradford City later said they had no regrets about Rowe's short stay with the club. He made his debut two days later in a 0–0 draw with Wrexham, taking 6 matches to score his first goal, grabbing the fourth in a 4–1 thrashing of King's Lynn Town. In the penultimate match of the season, Rowe scored a vital double as Chesterfield beat Dagenham & Redbridge 2–1 to keep Chesterfield in the play-offs, a position they remained in after the season's conclusion.

==== AFC Fylde (loan) ====
On 23 August 2022, Rowe returned to AFC Fylde on loan until 1 January 2023.

==== York City (loan) ====
On 23 March 2023, Rowe joined relegation-threatened National League club York City on loan until the end of the season.

On 4 October 2023, Rowe had his Chesterfield contract terminated by mutual consent.

=== Macclesfield ===
On 12 October 2023, Rowe signed for Northern Premier League Premier Division club Macclesfield. He left Macclesfield a month later citing an underlying health condition.

== Post-retirement ==
On 1 October 2025, Rowe was appointed head scout by former club AFC Fylde.

== Career statistics ==
As of 3 April 2023

Appearances and goals by club, season and competition
Club	Season	League			FA Cup		EFL Cup		Other		Total	
Club	Season	Division	Apps	Goals	Apps	Goals	Apps	Goals	Apps	Goals	Apps	Goals
Fleetwood Town	2010–11	Conference Premier	5	0	0	0	—		0	0	5	0
Fleetwood Town	2011–12	Conference Premier	2	0	0	0	—		0	0	2	0
Fleetwood Town	2012–13	League Two	0	0	0	0	0	0	0	0	0	0
Fleetwood Town	Total		7	0	0	0	0	0	0	0	7	0
Droylsden (loan)	2011–12	Conference North	22	11	3	1	—		2 (Note: Appearance(s) in FA Trophy)	2	26	14
Stockport County (loan)	2011–12	Conference Premier	15	8	—		—		—		15	8
Stockport County (loan)	2012–13	Conference Premier	13	1	2	1	—		1	1	16	3
Barrow (loan)	2012–13	Conference Premier	21	4	—		—		1	0	22	4
Lincoln City	2013–14	Conference Premier	23	3	0	0	—		1	0	24	3
AFC Fylde	2014–15	Conference North	39	26	5	0	—		6 (Note: Four appearances and four goals in FA Trophy, two appearances in National League North play-offs)	4	50	30
AFC Fylde	2015–16	National League North	41	25	4	3	—		8 (Note: Five appearances and seven goals in FA Trophy, three appearances and one goal in National League North play-offs)	8	53	36
AFC Fylde	2016–17	National League North	42	47	1	0	—		2	3	45	50
AFC Fylde	2017–18	National League	46	24	4	5	—		2 (Note: One appearance and one goal in FA Trophy, one appearance in National League play-offs)	1	52	30
AFC Fylde	2018–19	National League	45	27	1	1	—		11 (Note: Eight appearances and five goals in FA Trophy, three appearances in National League play-offs)	5	57	33
AFC Fylde	2019–20	National League	28	6	4	3	—		1	1	33	10
AFC Fylde	Total		241	155	19	12	—		30	22	290	189
Oldham Athletic	2019–20	League Two	10	3	—		—		—		10	3
Oldham Athletic	2020–21	League Two	15	4	2	2	1	0	4 (Note: Appearances in EFL Trophy)	2	22	8
Oldham Athletic	Total		25	7	2	2	1	0	4	2	32	11
Bradford City	2020–21	League Two	18	5	0	0	0	0	0	0	18	5
Chesterfield	2020–21	National League	9	3	0	0	—		1	1	10	4
Chesterfield	2021–22	National League	13	5	0	0	—		1	1	14	6
Chesterfield	2022–23	National League	2	0	0	0	—		0	0	2	0
Chesterfield	Total		24	8	0	0	0	0	2	2	26	10
AFC Fylde (loan)	2022–23	National League North	9	2	3	0	—		0	0	12	2
York City (loan)	2022–23	National League	3	0	0	0	—		0	0	2	0
Career total			421	204	29	16	1	0	40	29	491	249

== Honours ==
=== Club ===
AFC Fylde

- National League North: 2016–17
- FA Trophy: 2018–19

=== Individual ===
- AFC Fylde Player of the Season: 2015–16, 2016–17
- AFC Fylde Goal of the Season: 2015–16, 2016–17
- AFC Fylde Players' Player of the Season: 2016–17
- National League North Player of the Season: 2017–18
- Blue Square Bet North Player of the Month: November 2011
- National League North Player of the Month: March 2016, August 2016, September 2016
- National League Player of the Month: November 2017
- National League Player of the Season: 2017–18, 2018–19
- League Two Goal of the Month: November 2020
