= Lewis McKinney =

English footballer

Personal information
- Full name: Lewis Christopher Mark McKinney
- Position: Midfielder

Team information
- Current team: Salford City

Youth career
- Burnley
- 2017–2020: Oldham Athletic

Senior career*
Years	Team	Apps	(Gls)
2019–2020	Oldham Athletic	1	(0)
2019	→ Runcorn Linnets (loan)		
2020–	Salford City Under-23		
- * Club domestic league appearances and goals as of 00:00, 19 October 2019 (UTC)

Lewis Christopher Mark McKinney is an English professional footballer who plays as a midfielder for Salford City's Under-23 development team.

== Career ==
McKinney played for Burnley's youth teams before joining Oldham Athletic for the start of the 2017–18 season, signing two-year scholarship forms to join the club's youth team from the 2018–19 season. He made his first-team debut as a 69th-minute substitute for Mohamed Maouche in a 1–0 defeat to Macclesfield Town at Boundary Park on 19 October 2019. In November 2019, he joined Runcorn Linnets on a month's work experience loan.

At the end of the 2019–20 season he was not offered a professional contract by the club and released.

After his release from Oldham, he played for Salford City's under-23 development team in the 2020–21 season.

== Career statistics ==
As of 19 October 2019

Appearances and goals by club, season and competition
Club	Season	League			FA Cup		EFL Cup		Other		Total	
Club	Season	Division	Apps	Goals	Apps	Goals	Apps	Goals	Apps	Goals	Apps	Goals
Oldham Athletic	2019–20	EFL League Two	1	0	0	0	0	0	0	0	1	0
Career total			1	0	0	0	0	0	0	0	1	0
