= Reece Gaskell =

English footballer

Personal information
- Full name: Reece Gaskell
- Date of birth: 15 September 2001 (age 25)
- Place of birth: Warrington, England
- Position: Midfielder

Team information
- Current team: Oldham Athletic
- Number: 43

Youth career
- Oldham Athletic

Senior career*
Years	Team	Apps	(Gls)
2019–	Oldham Athletic	1	(0)
2019	→ Runcorn Linnets (loan)		
- * Club domestic league appearances and goals as of 01:00, 17 December 2019 (UTC)

Reece Gaskell (born 15 September 2001) is an English professional footballer who plays as a midfielder for Oldham Athletic.

== Career ==
On 22 October 2019, Gaskell made his debut for Oldham Athletic as a substitute in a 2–0 win against Walsall. In November 2019, Gaskell signed for Runcorn Linnets on loan.

== Career statistics ==
As of 17 December 2019.

Appearances and goals by club, season and competition
Club	Season	League			FA Cup		League Cup		Other		Total	
Club	Season	Division	Apps	Goals	Apps	Goals	Apps	Goals	Apps	Goals	Apps	Goals
Oldham Athletic	2019–20	League Two	1	0	0	0	0	0	0 (Note: Appearance(s) in EFL Trophy)	0	1	0
Career total			1	0	0	0	0	0	0	0	1	0
