= Andrea Badan =

Italian football player (born 1998)

Personal information
- Date of birth: 21 March 1998 (age 28)
- Place of birth: Monselice, Italy
- Height: 1.76 m (5 ft 9 1/2 in)
- Position: Defender

Youth career
- –2014: Padova
- 2014–2017: Hellas Verona

Senior career*
Years	Team	Apps	(Gls)
2015–2020	Hellas Verona	0	(0)
2017–2018	→ Prato (loan)	20	(0)
2018	→ AlbinoLeffe (loan)	1	(0)
2018–2019	→ Alessandria (loan)	25	(0)
2019–2020	→ Carrarese (loan)	1	(0)
2020	→ Cavese (loan)	1	(0)
2020–2021	Oldham Athletic	18	(0)
- * Club domestic league appearances and goals as of 31 May 2021

Andrea Badan (born 21 March 1998) is an Italian footballer who last played as a defender for Oldham Athletic.

== Club career ==
He made his Serie C debut for Prato on 27 August 2017 in a game against Viterbese Castrense.

On 15 July 2019, he joined Carrarese on loan. On 29 January 2020, he moved on loan to Cavese.

On 9 September 2020, Badan joined League Two side Oldham Athletic on a two-year deal. Badan left the club on 1 September 2021, his contract terminated by mutual consent.
