= Brice Ntambwe =

Belgian footballer

Personal information
- Date of birth: 29 April 1993 (age 33)
- Place of birth: Brussels, Belgium
- Height: 1.88 m (6 ft 2 in)
- Position: Midfielder

Youth career
- SV Ritterclub
- 200?–2009: FC Brussels
- 2009–2011: Birmingham City

Senior career*
Years	Team	Apps	(Gls)
2011–2013	Birmingham City	0	(0)
2013–2015	Mons	27	(1)
2015–2018	Lierse	23	(1)
2017	→ Oosterzonen Oosterwijk (loan)	9	(1)
2018–2019	Partick Thistle	5	(1)
2019–2020	Macclesfield Town	11	(0)
2020–2021	Oldham Athletic	24	(0)

International career
2008	Belgium U15	5	(0)
2008–2009	Belgium U16	11	(0)
2008–2010	Belgium U17	11	(2)
2012	Belgium U19	1	(0)
2012	Belgium U20	1	(0)
2013	Belgium U21	6	(0)
- * Club domestic league appearances and goals

Brice Ntambwe (born 29 April 1993) is a Belgian footballer who played as a midfielder. He began his football career in the youth system of FC Brussels before moving to England to join Birmingham City. He turned professional with Birmingham, but never made a first-team appearance, and returned to Belgium to join Mons in January 2013. He went on to play for Lierse and in Scotland for Partick Thistle before returning to England with Macclesfield Town in January 2019 and Oldham Athletic for the 2020–21 season. He has represented Belgium in international football at levels up to under-21.

== Club career ==
=== Early life and club career ===
Ntambwe was born in Brussels, and played football for Ritterklub vsv Jette before joining the youth system at FC Brussels. As a 16-year-old, he moved to England to start a two-year scholarship programme in Birmingham City's Youth Academy in 2009. He played in the under-18 and reserve teams, and was rewarded with a two-year professional contract in July 2011. Academy manager Kristjaan Speakman described him as a central midfielder who "can play in either a two or a three and I think he's most suited to playing deep. He's got some real assets in terms of his physical presence and his ability to get round the pitch, but is also neat and tidy on the ball." The Birmingham Mail's correspondent assessed him as "a powerful player with endurance [who] is good in the air".

Ntambwe was given a first-team squad number prior to the 2011–12 FA Cup fifth-round tie against Chelsea. but was not included in the matchday squad. Following injuries to central midfielders Guirane N'Daw, Keith Fahey and Jordon Mutch, Ntambwe was included in the travelling party for the visit to Ipswich Town in the Football League Championship on 17 April, but again failed to make the matchday squad. Although numerous youngsters were given first-team squad numbers in the 2012–13 season, Ntambwe was not.

=== RAEC Mons ===
He returned to Belgium in January 2013 to join Pro League club Mons. He signed an 18-month contract with the option of a further year. After playing 90 minutes for the club's under-21 side in midweek, Ntambwe was included in Enzo Scifo's starting eleven to strengthen the midfield for the visit to Standard Liège on 10 February. Ntambwe played 68 minutes as Mons won 1–0 to achieve their first ever victory against Standard away from home. Ntambwe was sent off after 73 minutes of his third match, against Kortrijk, for a reckless tackle, having already been yellow-carded earlier in the game; Scifo attributed it to youthful enthusiasm which he needed to learn to control.

=== Partick Thistle ===
Ntambwe signed for Scottish Championship Club Partick Thistle on a one-year deal in August 2018. Ntambwe scored his first goal for Thistle scoring a header from a corner to put Thistle 1–0 up in an eventual 5–1 defeat to Greenock Morton. Ntambwe left Partick Thistle in January 2019 by mutual consent, making 6 appearances in all competitions, scoring one goal.

=== Macclesfield Town ===
After leaving Partick Thistle Ntambwe returned to England to join League Two club Macclesfield Town until the end of the season. Ntambwe signed a one-year contract extension after helping Macclesfield secure safety in league two. Ntambwe left Macclesfield in January 2020 to return to Belgium for personal reasons.

=== Oldham Athletic ===
He joined another League Two club, Oldham Athletic, on 17 October 2020 on a contract to run until the end of the season. He made 28 appearances in all competitions, mainly as a starter, and was released when his contract expired.

== International career ==
Ntwambe was born in Belgium and is of Congolese descent. Ntambwe represented Belgium at all levels from under-15 to under-20. He captained and played regularly for the Belgium under-17 team in the 2009–10 season. He received the award for outstanding defender of the 2010 Minsk international under-17 tournament, at which Belgium lost to Russia in the final. He made his under-19 debut in the starting eleven for a friendly against Serbia under-19 in February 2012, and later that year, he was a member of the under-20 team that played England C in the International Challenge Trophy.

Ntambwe received his first call-up to the under-21 team for the 2015 European Championship qualifier against Cyprus in March 2013. He remained an unused substitute as Belgium won 2–0. He played three times for the under-21s at the 2013 Toulon Tournament, before making his competitive debut as a second-half substitute as Belgium beat Italy 3–1 in their first qualifying match for the 2015 European championships.
