= Cameron Borthwick-Jackson =

English footballer (born 1997)

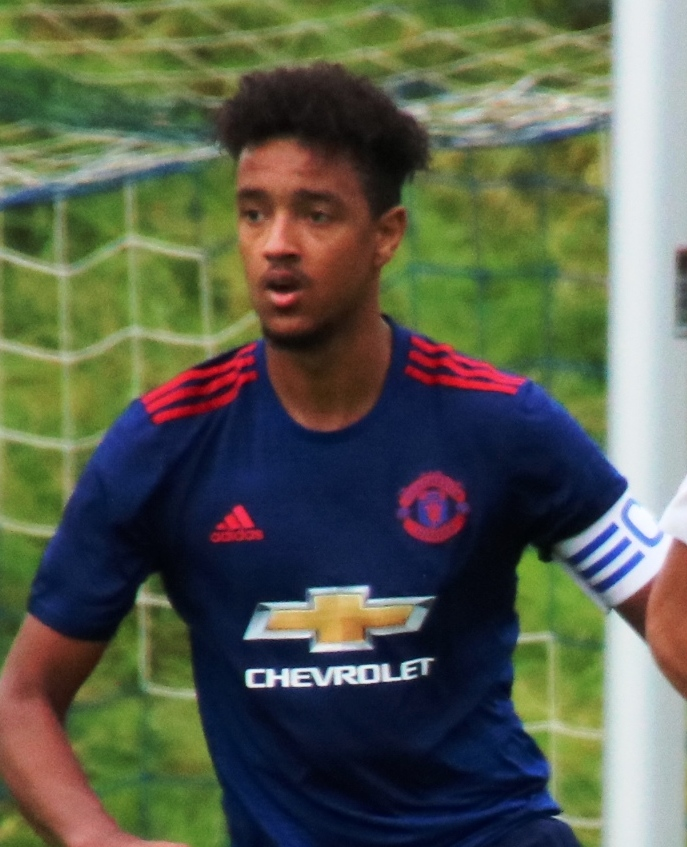
- Borthwick-Jackson playing for Manchester United in 2017.

Personal information
- Full name: Cameron Jake Borthwick-Jackson
- Date of birth: 2 February 1997 (age 29)
- Place of birth: Manchester, England
- Height: 6 ft 0 in (1.83 m)
- Position: Left-back

Team information
- Current team: Macclesfield

Youth career
- Fletcher Moss Rangers
- 2003–2015: Manchester United

Senior career*
| Years | Team | Apps | (Gls) |
| 2015–2020 | Manchester United | 10 | (0) |
| 2016–2017 | → Wolverhampton Wanderers (loan) | 6 | (0) |
| 2017–2018 | → Leeds United (loan) | 1 | (0) |
| 2018–2019 | → Scunthorpe United (loan) | 29 | (2) |
| 2019–2020 | → Tranmere Rovers (loan) | 3 | (0) |
| 2020 | → Oldham Athletic (loan) | 6 | (0) |
| 2020–2021 | Oldham Athletic | 31 | (2) |
| 2021–2023 | Burton Albion | 59 | (2) |
| 2023–2024 | Śląsk Wrocław | 2 | (0) |
| 2023 | Śląsk Wrocław II | 5 | (0) |
| 2024 | → Ross County (loan) | 4 | (0) |
| 2026– | Macclesfield | 42 | (1) |

International career
| 2012–2013 | England U16 | 3 | (0) |
| 2013–2014 | England U17 | 6 | (0) |
| 2015–2016 | England U19 | 2 | (0) |
| 2016 | England U20 | 1 | (0) |
- * Club domestic league appearances and goals as of 18:29, 8 January 2026 (UTC)

Cameron Jake Borthwick-Jackson (born 2 February 1997) is an English professional footballer who plays as a left-back for National League North club Macclesfield.

== Club career ==
=== Manchester United ===
Born in Manchester, Borthwick-Jackson joined Manchester United's Academy at the age of 6 in July 2003 from Fletcher Moss Rangers. He made his debut for the club's reserve team at the age of 16, coming on as a substitute for Tom Lawrence in a 4–1 win over Bolton Wanderers on 16 September 2013. He made 22 appearances for the under-18s during the 2013–14 season, as well as two more in the FA Youth Cup, and got on the scoresheet in the penultimate league game of the season against Stoke City on 29 April 2014.

In July 2014, Borthwick-Jackson played in all five of the under-17s' matches at the Milk Cup, scoring in both the 4–0 semi-final win over Scottish side Partick Thistle and the only goal in the final against French club Vendée. He held a regular spot in the under-18s throughout the 2014–15 season, playing in 28 of their 29 league games, and scoring the second goal in their 2–1 win over Blackburn Rovers on 31 January 2015. However, he also scored an own goal to level the scores against Chelsea on 2 May, before Chelsea went on to win 2–1.

He made the step up to the club's under-21s in 2015–16, and on 7 November 2015, he was named on the first-team substitutes' bench for the first time against West Bromwich Albion; he came on for Marcos Rojo in the 76th minute for his senior debut. Multiple injuries to the squad saw Borthwick-Jackson make his first start on 12 December 2015 away at Bournemouth, ending in a 2–1 defeat. He finished the season with 10 senior league appearances, as well as winning the U21 Premier League.

On 2 May 2016, at the club's annual award ceremony, he won the U21 Player of the Year award after receiving more votes than teammates James Weir and Donald Love. On 30 May 2016, Borthwick-Jackson signed a new contract with United, keeping him at the club until 2020, with the option to extend for a further year. He was released by Manchester United when his contract expired on 30 June 2020.

==== Wolverhampton Wanderers (loan) ====
On 22 August 2016, Borthwick-Jackson joined Championship side Wolverhampton Wanderers on a season-long loan. He made his club debut on 10 September 2016, in a 1–1 draw with Burton Albion. He went on to make a further five league appearances for Wolves up until the appointment of new manager Paul Lambert on 5 November 2016. After which he was phased out of the squad, with his last start being on 5 November 2016 and his last showing on the bench on 10 December 2016. The lack of game time led to Borthwick-Jackson returning to Manchester United to play for the Under-23s in the second half of the season after a mutual agreement between the two clubs was made.

==== Leeds United (loan) ====
On 7 August 2017, Borthwick-Jackson joined Championship club and rivals Leeds United on a season-long loan for the 2017–18 campaign. His debut came two days later against Port Vale in the EFL Cup, which ended in a 4–1 win. He made his League debut for Leeds on 12 August in a 0–0 draw against Preston North End.

On 16 January 2018, it was announced that Borthwick-Jackson's loan had been cancelled.

==== Scunthorpe United (loan) ====
On 28 July 2018, Borthwick-Jackson joined League One side Scunthorpe United on a season long loan deal. He scored his first senior goals when he scored twice in a 5–3 win over Charlton Athletic on 2 October 2018. Upon returning to Manchester United in June 2019, Borthwick-Jackson had a trial with Eredivisie outfit SC Heerenveen in July.

==== Tranmere Rovers (loan) ====
On 2 September 2019, Borthwick-Jackson joined League One side Tranmere Rovers on loan for the 2019–20 season. On 9 January 2020, Borthwick-Jackson was recalled to Manchester United. He played 5 games in total for the club.

==== Oldham Athletic (loan) ====
After his loan at Tranmere was cut short, Borthwick-Jackson signed for League Two club Oldham Athletic for the rest of the season.

=== Oldham Athletic ===
Following his release from Manchester United, Borthwick-Jackson joined Oldham on a permanent basis, signing a one-year deal on 2 August.

=== Burton Albion ===
On 7 June 2021, it was announced that Borthwick-Jackson was joining League One club Burton Albion on a two-year deal following the expiration of his contract at Oldham.

=== Śląsk Wrocław ===
On 26 July 2023, Borthwick-Jackson joined Polish Ekstraklasa side Śląsk Wrocław on a two-year deal with an optional one-year extension.

==== Ross County (loan) ====
On 18 January 2024, he joined Scottish Premiership outfit Ross County on loan until the end of the season.

After returning from loan, Borthwick-Jackson terminated his contract with Śląsk by mutual consent on 10 August 2024.

=== Macclesfield ===
In January 2026, Borthwick-Jackson returned to England after seventeen months without a club, joining National League North club Macclesfield on a short-term deal until the end of the season.

== International career ==
Borthwick-Jackson has represented England at youth level, playing three matches for the under-16s and six for the under-17s. He made his debut for the under-19s against the Netherlands on 12 November 2015.

== Career statistics ==
As of match played 6 February 2024

Appearances and goals by club, season and competition
| Club | Season | League | | | National cup (Note: Includes FA Cup, Polish Cup) | | League cup (Note: Includes EFL Cup) | | Continental | | Other | | Total | |
| Club | Season | Division | Apps | Goals | Apps | Goals | Apps | Goals | Apps | Goals | Apps | Goals | Apps | Goals |
|---|---|---|---|---|---|---|---|---|---|---|---|---|---|---|
| Manchester United | 2015–16 | Premier League | 10 | 0 | 3 | 0 | 0 | 0 | 1 (Note: Appearance in UEFA Champions League) | 0 | — | | 14 | 0 |
| Wolverhampton Wanderers (loan) | 2016–17 | Championship | 6 | 0 | 0 | 0 | 1 | 0 | — | | — | | 7 | 0 |
| Leeds United (loan) | 2017–18 | Championship | 1 | 0 | 1 | 0 | 4 | 0 | — | | — | | 6 | 0 |
| Scunthorpe United (loan) | 2018–19 | League One | 29 | 2 | 1 | 0 | 1 | 0 | — | | 2 (Note: Appearances in EFL Trophy) | 0 | 33 | 2 |
| Tranmere Rovers (loan) | 2019–20 | League One | 3 | 0 | 1 | 0 | 0 | 0 | — | | 2 | 0 | 6 | 0 |
| Oldham Athletic (loan) | 2019–20 | League Two | 6 | 0 | 0 | 0 | 0 | 0 | — | | — | | 6 | 0 |
| Oldham Athletic | 2020–21 | League Two | 31 | 2 | 2 | 0 | 2 | 0 | — | | — | | 35 | 2 |
| Oldham Athletic | Total | | 37 | 2 | 2 | 0 | 2 | 0 | — | | — | | 41 | 0 |
| Burton Albion | 2021–22 | League One | 37 | 2 | 2 | 0 | 0 | 0 | — | | 3 | 0 | 42 | 2 |
| Burton Albion | 2022–23 | League One | 22 | 0 | 3 | 0 | 1 | 0 | — | | 4 | 0 | 30 | 0 |
| Burton Albion | Total | | 59 | 2 | 5 | 0 | 1 | 0 | — | | 7 | 0 | 72 | 2 |
| Śląsk Wrocław | 2023–24 | Ekstraklasa | 2 | 0 | 1 | 0 | — | | — | | — | | 3 | 0 |
| Śląsk Wrocław II | 2023–24 | III liga | 5 | 0 | 0 | 0 | — | | — | | — | | 5 | 0 |
| Ross County (loan) | 2023–24 | Scottish Premiership | 4 | 0 | 0 | 0 | — | | — | | — | | 4 | 0 |
| Career total | | | 156 | 5 | 14 | 0 | 9 | 0 | 1 | 0 | 11 | 0 | 191 | 6 |

== Honours ==
Individual

- Denzil Haroun Reserve Player of the Year: 2015–16
