= 2017–18 Oldham Athletic A.F.C. season =

Oldham Athletic
2017–18 season
- Chairman: Simon Corney
- Manager: John Sheridan (until 25 September); Richie Wellens (from 18 October)
- Stadium: Boundary Park
- League One: 21st (relegated)
- FA Cup: First round
- EFL Cup: First round
- EFL Trophy: Group stage
- Top goalscorer: League: Eoin Doyle (12); All: Eoin Doyle (12)
Home colours	Away colours

The 2017–18 season was Oldham Athletic's 123rd season in their history and 21st consecutive season in League One. Along with competing in League One, the club also participated in the FA Cup, EFL Cup and EFL Trophy.

The season covers the period from 1 July 2017 to 30 June 2018.

== Transfers ==
=== Transfers in ===
Date from	Position	Nationality	Name	From	Fee	Ref.
1 July 2017	CF	(Wales)	Craig Davies	Scunthorpe United	Free	
1 July 2017	AM	(England)	Dan Gardner	Chesterfield	Free	
13 July 2017	RB	(England)	Rob Hunt	Brighton & Hove Albion	Undisclosed	
17 July 2017	CF	(Republic of Ireland)	Courtney Duffus	Everton	Undisclosed	
9 August 2017	RW	(Belgium)	Gyamfi Kyeremeh	Eintracht Braunschweig II	Free	
31 August 2017	GK	(Haiti)	Johny Placide	Guingamp	Free	
6 September 2017	LW	(Curaçao)	Gevaro Nepomuceno	Marítimo	Undisclosed	
6 September 2017	AM	(Algeria)	Abdelhakim Omrani	Sedan	Undisclosed	
12 September 2017	CM	(France)	Mohamed Maouche	Tours	Free	
29 December 2017	FW	(Republic of Ireland)	Patrick McEleney	Dundalk	Undisclosed	

=== Transfers out ===
Date from	Position	Nationality	Name	To	Fee	Ref.
1 July 2017	RM	(England)	Lee Croft	Southport	Released	(Note: Lee Croft joined Southport following his release.)
1 July 2017	LB	(Republic of Ireland)	Charles Dunne	Motherwell	Released	(Note: Charles Dunne joined Motherwell following his release.)
1 July 2017	MF	(England)	Lee Knight	Free agent	Released	
1 July 2017	RB	(England)	Josh Law	York City	Released	(Note: Josh Law joined York City following his release.)
1 July 2017	CF	(England)	Michael Ngoo	KF Tirana	Released	(Note: Michael Ngoo joined KF Tirana following his release.)
1 July 2017	LB	(England)	Jamie Reckord	Free agent	Released	

=== Loans in ===
Start date	Position	Nationality	Name	From	End date	Ref.
4 August 2017	GK	(England)	Ben Wilson	Cardiff City	January 2018	
29 August 2017	CM	(Republic of Ireland)	Jack Byrne	Wigan Athletic	January 2018	
31 August 2017	CB	(England)	Kean Bryan	Manchester City	1 January 2018	
31 August 2017	CF	(Republic of Ireland)	Eoin Doyle	Preston North End	1 January 2018	
31 August 2017	GK	(Scotland)	Jack Ruddy	Wolverhampton Wanderers	1 January 2018	
6 September 2017	LW	(Netherlands)	Queensy Menig	Nantes	30 June 2018	

=== Loans out ===
Start date	Position	Nationality	Name	To	End date	Ref.
22 September 2017	DF	(England)	Kallum Mantack	FC United of Manchester	20 October 2017	
13 October 2017	CB	(England)	George Edmundson	AFC Fylde	1 January 2018	(Note: On 10 November, Edmundson extended his loan stay with AFC Fylde.)
13 October 2017	CB	(England)	Jamie Stott	AFC Fylde	10 November 2017	
30 October 2017	CM	(England)	Mason Fawns	Ashton United	27 November 2017	
3 November 2017	DF	(England)	Kallum Mantack	Stockport County	3 December 2017	
10 November 2017	CB	(England)	Jamie Stott	Curzon Ashton	1 January 2018	

== Competitions ==
=== Friendlies ===
As of 28 June 2017, Oldham Athletic have announced seven pre-season friendlies against Curzon Ashton, Stalybridge Celtic, Accrington Stanley, Salisbury, Swindon Town, Girona and Manchester United U/23.

8 July 2017	Stalybridge Celtic	1–4	Oldham Athletic	Stalybridge
15:00 BST	Thomas 65'	Report	Trialist 34'; Obadeyi 36'; Fané 51'; Osei 68'	Stadium: Bower Fold

12 July 2017	Salisbury	0–3	Oldham Athletic	Old Sarum
19:45 BST		Report	Flynn 2'; Obadeyi 80', 86'	Stadium: The Raymond McEnhill Stadium

14 July 2017	Swindon Town	1–1	Oldham Athletic	Swindon
12:00 BST	(?)	Report	Amadi-Holloway (?)	Stadium: County Ground; Attendance: 0

18 July 2017	Curzon Ashton	1–1	Oldham Athletic	Ashton-under-Lyne
19:45 BST	Shaw 63'	Report	Amadi-Holloway 46'	Stadium: Tameside Stadium; Attendance: 1,128

22 July 2017	Accrington Stanley	2–2	Oldham Athletic	Accrington
15:00 BST	Kee 16'; McLeod 77'	Report	Davies 55' (pen.); Duffus 85'	Stadium: Crown Ground

27 July 2017	Oldham Athletic	1–2	Girona	Oldham
19:00 BST	Duffus 90' (pen.)	Report	Amagat 1'; Benítez 15'	Stadium: Boundary Park; Referee: Ben Toner (England)

1 August 2017	Oldham Athletic	0–1	Manchester United XI	Oldham
19:30 BST		Report	Gribbin 75'	Stadium: Boundary Park

=== League One ===
==== League table ====
Pos	Team	Pld	W	D	L	GF	GA	GD	Pts	Promotion, qualification or relegation
19	Walsall	46	13	13	20	53	66	−13	52	
20	Rochdale	46	11	18	17	49	57	−8	51	
21	Oldham Athletic (R)	46	11	17	18	58	75	−17	50	Relegation to EFL League Two
22	Northampton Town (R)	46	12	11	23	43	77	−34	47	Relegation to EFL League Two
23	Milton Keynes Dons (R)	46	11	12	23	43	69	−26	45	Relegation to EFL League Two

Source: BBC Sport
Rules for classification: 1) Points; 2) Goal difference; 3) Number of goals scored
(R) Relegated

==== Result summary ====
Overall								Home						Away					
Pld	W	D	L	GF	GA	GD	Pts	W	D	L	GF	GA	GD	W	D	L	GF	GA	GD
28	7	8	13	40	50	−10	29	5	3	6	23	22	+1	2	5	7	17	28	−11

Last updated: 13 January 2018.

==== Result by matchday ====
Round	1	2	3	4	5	6	7	8	9	10	11	12	13	14	15	16	17	18	19	20	21	22	23	24	25	26	27	28	29	30	31	32	33	34	35	36	37	38	39	40	41	42	43	44	45	46
Ground	H	A	H	A	H	A	A	H	A	H	A	H	A	A	H	H	H	H	A	A	H	A	A	H	H	A	A	H	A	H	H	A	H	A	A	H	A	H	A	H	H	A	A	H	H	A
Result	L	L	L	L	L	D	W	L	L	W	W	W	D	D	W	L	W	D	D	L	W	D	L	L	D	L	L	D	L	L	W	D	W	W	D	L	L	W	D	D	D	D	D	L	D	D
Position	22	23	24	23	23	24	21	24	24	23	18	17	19	20	17	18	15	16	17	18	16	15	20	20	20	20	20	20	22	22	21	21	19	18	19	19	21	19	19	20	20	20	20	21	20	21

Updated to match(es) played on 13 January 2018. Source:
A = Away; H = Home; W = Win; D = Draw; L = Loss

==== Matches ====
On 21 June 2017, the league fixtures were announced.

5 August 2017 1	Oldham Athletic	0–2	Oxford United	Oldham
15:00 BST	McLaughlin (yellow card) 71'	Report	Thomas 39'; Rothwell (yellow card) 68'; Ruffels 71'; Williamson (yellow card) 79'	Stadium: Boundary Park; Attendance: 4,874; Referee: David Webb

12 August 2017 2	Walsall	2–1	Oldham Athletic	Bescot
15:00 BST	Edwards 53'; Chambers (yellow card) 73'; Oztumer 90'; Bakayoko (yellow card) 90+6'	Report	McLaughlin 32'; Banks (yellow card) 67'; Wilson (yellow card) 73'; Gerrard (yellow card) 84'	Stadium: Bescot Stadium; Attendance: 4,419; Referee: Dean Whitestone

19 August 2017 3	Oldham Athletic	0–2	Wigan Athletic	Oldham
15:00 BST	Dummigan (yellow card) 40'; Banks (yellow card) 60'	Report	Toney 8'; Jacobs 16' (yellow card) 39'; Burn (yellow card) 34'; Morsy (yellow card) 45+2'	Stadium: Boundary Park; Attendance: 5,446; Referee: Eddie Ilderton

26 August 2017 4	Blackpool	2–1	Oldham Athletic	Blackpool
15:00 BST	Longstaff 6'; Vassell 15'; Daniel (yellow card) 90+1'	Report	Banks (yellow card) 25'; Osei 70'	Stadium: Bloomfield Road; Attendance: 4,642; Referee: Peter Bankes

2 September 2017 5	Oldham Athletic	3–4	Charlton Athletic	Oldham
15:00 BST	Clarke (yellow card) 29'; Fané (yellow card) 30' (yellow-red card) 54'; Davies 34' (pen.) (yellow card) 59'; Gardner (yellow card) 39'; Doyle 51' (yellow card) 75'; Gerrard (yellow card) 54'; Byrne 82'	Report	Holmes 18' (yellow card) 90+6'; Fosu 21'; Clarke 62'; Dodoo 72' (yellow card) 90+4'; Forster-Caskey (yellow card) 90+2'	Stadium: Boundary Park; Attendance: 3,592; Referee: Ross Joyce

9 September 2017 6	Fleetwood Town	2–2	Oldham Athletic	Fleetwood
15:00 BST	Eastham 24'; Coyle (yellow card) 77'; Hunter 90+3' (pen.)	Report	Edmundson (yellow card) 10'; Davies 18'; Byrne (yellow card) 50'; Bryan 55'; Ruddy (yellow card) 90+3'	Stadium: Highbury Stadium; Attendance: 3,606; Referee: Robert Jones

12 September 2017 7	Bristol Rovers	2–3	Oldham Athletic	Horfield
19:45 BST	Gaffney 83'; Sweeney 85'; Telford (yellow card) 90+7'	Report	Byrne 49'; Gardner (yellow card) 60'; Davies 71'; Doyle 88'; Fané (yellow card) 90+7'	Stadium: Memorial Stadium; Attendance: 7,908; Referee: Brett Huxtable

16 September 2017 8	Oldham Athletic	1–2	Shrewsbury Town	Oldham
15:00 BST	Davies 33'; Doyle (yellow card) 38' (yellow-red card) 90+3'; Gardner (yellow card) 74'; Gerrard (yellow card) 90+5'	Report	Payne 19'; Nolan 65' (yellow card) 90'; Morris (yellow card) 73'; Rodman (yellow card) 80'	Stadium: Boundary Park; Attendance: 4,150; Referee: Ben Toner

23 September 2017 9	Rotherham United	5–1	Oldham Athletic	Rotherham
15:00 BST	Ihiekwe 8'; Taylor (yellow card) 31'; Moore 73', 78'; Forde 87'; Yates 89'	Report	Davies 21'; Gardner (yellow card) 32'; Edmundson (yellow card) 45'; Nepomuceno (yellow card) 68'	Stadium: New York Stadium; Attendance: 8,250; Referee: John Brooks

26 September 2017 10	Oldham Athletic	3–2	Peterborough United	Oldham
19:45 BST	Doyle 51', 85'; Wilson (red card) 57'; Gardner 80' (yellow card) 90+7'; Clarke (yellow card) 83'; Placide (yellow card) 90'	Report	Maddison 58' (pen.); Lopes (yellow card) 90'; Marriott 90+2'	Stadium: Boundary Park; Attendance: 2,975; Referee: Anthony Backhouse

30 September 2017 11	Portsmouth	1–2	Oldham Athletic	Milton
15:00 BST	Pitman 90'; O'Keefe (yellow card) 90+5'	Report	Doyle 16', 47'; Dummigan (yellow card) 33'; Bryan (yellow card) 51'; Byrne (yellow card) 66'; Banks (yellow card) 83'; Davies (yellow card) 90+4'; Placide (yellow card) 90+6'	Stadium: Fratton Park; Attendance: 17,848; Referee: Craig Hicks

7 October 2017 P	Oldham Athletic	v	Bury	Oldham
15:00 BST				Stadium: Boundary Park
Note: On 28 September, the scheduled home match against Bury was postponed due to international call-ups.

14 October 2017 12	Oldham Athletic	1–0	Blackburn Rovers	Oldham
15:00 BST	Dummigan (yellow card) 16'; Menig 90'	Report	Smallwood (yellow card) 61'; Bennett (yellow card) 73'; Chapman (yellow card) 75'; Dack (yellow card) 79'	Stadium: Boundary Park; Attendance: 7,784; Referee: Darren Handley

17 October 2017 13	Bradford City	1–1	Oldham Athletic	Bradford
19:45 BST	Taylor 3'; Vincelot (yellow card) 73'; Thompson (yellow card) 79'; Wyke (yellow card) 84'	Report	Doyle 23'; Omrani (yellow card) 82'; Hunt (yellow card) 83'; Bryan (yellow card) 85'	Stadium: Valley Parade; Attendance: 19,840; Referee: Chris Sarginson

21 October 2017 14	Milton Keynes Dons	4–4	Oldham Athletic	Denbigh
15:00 BST	Gilbey 17'; Upson 56', 89' (yellow card) 64'; Walsh (yellow card) 65'; Nesbitt 82'; Aneke (yellow card) 88'	Report	Davies 7'; Doyle 39', 45+1'; Clarke (yellow card) 55' (goal) 63'; Fané (yellow card) 67'; Hunt (yellow card) 90'	Stadium: Stadium mk Attendance: 9,312; Referee: Anthony Coggins

24 October 2017 15	Oldham Athletic	2–1	Bury	Oldham
19:45 BST	Doyle 24'; Byrne (yellow card) 44'; Amadi-Holloway 90+3'	Report	Aldred 47'; Ince (yellow card) 69'	Stadium: Boundary Park; Attendance: 5,183; Referee: Darren Drysdale

28 October 2017 16	Oldham Athletic	2–3	Scunthorpe United	Oldham
15:00 BST	Fané (yellow card) 31'; Clarke 45+1'; Davies 81'	Report	Hopper 5'; Morris 10'; Gilks (yellow card) 61'; Holmes 83'; McArdle (yellow card) 87'	Stadium: Boundary Park; Attendance: 4,331; Referee: Scott Oldham

11 November 2017 P	Southend United	v	Oldham Athletic	Southend-on-Sea
15:00 GMT				Stadium: Roots Hall
Note: On 2 November, the scheduled away trip to Southend United was postponed due to international call-ups.

18 November 2017 17	Oldham Athletic	3–1	Rochdale	Oldham
15:00 GMT	Dummigan 2'; Gardner (yellow card) 44'; Fané (yellow card) 59'; Placide (yellow card) 74'; Doyle 83', 86'	Report	Done 16'	Stadium: Boundary Park; Attendance: 6,129; Referee: Jeremy Simpson

21 November 2017 18	Oldham Athletic	0–0	AFC Wimbledon	Oldham
19:45 GMT	Bryan (yellow card) 14'	Report	Long (yellow card) 90+3'	Stadium: Boundary Park; Attendance: 3,169; Referee: Robert Lewis

25 November 2017 19	Gillingham	0–0	Oldham Athletic	Gillingham
15:00 GMT	Byrne (yellow card) 33'	Report	Gardner (yellow card) 40'; Gerrard (yellow card) 68'; Bryan (yellow card) 90'	Stadium: Priestfield Stadium; Attendance: 4,364; Referee: Graham Horwood

2 December 2017 20	Southend United	2–0	Oldham Athletic	Southend-on-Sea
15:00 GMT	Demetriou 17' (pen.) (yellow card) 40'; Wright 54'; McLaughlin (yellow card) 56'	Report	Doyle (yellow card) 90+3'	Stadium: Roots Hall; Attendance: 5,608; Referee: Charles Breakspear

9 December 2017 21	Oldham Athletic	5–1	Northampton Town	Oldham
15:00 GMT	Byrne 4', 45+2'; Obadeyi 26'; Nepomuceno (yellow card) 41' (goal) 60'; Fané (yellow card) 84'; Davies 90+3'	Report	Buchanan (yellow card) 36'; Taylor (yellow card) 45+1'; Foley 47'	Stadium: Boundary Park; Attendance: 3,532; Referee: Graham Salisbury

16 December 2017 22	Doncaster Rovers	1–1	Oldham Athletic	Doncaster
15:00 GMT	Butler 59'	Report	Gerrard (yellow card) 59'; Doyle 88'	Stadium: Keepmoat Stadium; Attendance: 7,831; Referee: Gavin Ward

23 December 2017 23	Plymouth Argyle	4–1	Oldham Athletic	Plymouth
15:00 GMT	Diagouraga 3' (yellow card) 30'; Carey 6'; Edwards 59'; Jervis 72'	Report	Wilson (yellow card) 40'; Byrne (yellow card) 43'; Gerrard 56'; Hunt (yellow card) 84'	Stadium: Home Park; Attendance: 10,017; Referee: (England) Lee Collins

26 December 2017 24	Oldham Athletic	1–2	Fleetwood Town	Oldham
15:00 GMT	Bryan 82'	Report	Cole 50' (yellow card) 75'; Hunter 67'; Eastham (yellow card) 80'; Bell (yellow card) 90+3'	Stadium: Boundary Park; Attendance: 4,578; Referee: (England) Mark Heywood

30 December 2017 25	Oldham Athletic	1–1	Bristol Rovers	Oldham
15:00 GMT	Davies 72'; Bryan (yellow card) 90'	Report	Sinclair (yellow card) 38'; Bodin 49'	Stadium: Boundary Park; Attendance: 3,928; Referee: (England) Michael Salisbury

1 January 2018 26	Shrewsbury Town	1–0	Oldham Athletic	Shrewsbury
15:00 GMT	Whalley 16'; Nolan (yellow card) 57'	Report	Gardner (yellow card) 73'; Byrne (yellow card) 84'	Stadium: Montgomery Waters Meadow; Attendance: 6,383; Referee: (England) Tom Nield

6 January 2018 27	Charlton Athletic	1–0	Oldham Athletic	London
15:00 GMT	Mavididi (yellow card) 4' (goal) 27'; Bauer (yellow card) 43'; Konsa (yellow card) 87'	Report	Green (yellow card) 68'; Nepomuceno (yellow card) 73'; Placide (yellow card) 79'	Stadium: The Valley; Attendance: 9,972; Referee: (England) Lee Swabey

13 January 2018 28	Oldham Athletic	1–1	Rotherham United	Oldham
15:00 GMT	Davies 31'; Pringle (yellow card) 90+5'	Report	Williams 7'; Vaulks (yellow card) 63'	Stadium: Boundary Park; Attendance: 4,775; Referee: (England) Rob Lewis

20 January 2018 29	Peterborough United	3–0	Oldham Athletic	Peterborough
15:00 GMT	Morias 53'; Cooper 84'; Marriott 90' (pen.)	Report	Edmundson (yellow card) 45' (yellow-red card) 68'	Stadium: London Road Stadium; Attendance: 5,072; Referee: Seb Stockbridge

27 January 2018 30	Oldham Athletic	1–2	Plymouth Argyle	Oldham
15:00 GMT	Gerrard (yellow card) 50'; Songo'o 54' (o.g.); Nepomuceno (yellow card) 90'	Report	Sarcevic 17', (yellow card) 51'; Lameiras 19'; Ness (yellow card) 25'; Songo'o (yellow card) 29'; Taylor (yellow card) 52'; Matthews (yellow card) 70'	Stadium: Boundary Park; Attendance: 4,274; Referee: Martin Coy

3 February 2018 31	Oldham Athletic	2–1	Bradford City	Oldham
	Dummigan 12' (yellow card) 12'; Byrne (yellow card) 55'; Holloway 86'	Report	Lund (yellow card) 56'; Chicksen (yellow card) 80'; Dieng (yellow card) 85'; Gibson 88'	Stadium: Boundary Park; Attendance: 5,526; Referee: Anthony Backhouse

10 February 2018 32	Blackburn Rovers	2–2	Oldham Athletic	Blackburn
15:00 GMT	Mulgrew 63'; Armstrong 71'	Report	Nazon 26', 38'; Pringle (yellow card) 32'; Fané (yellow card) 45+4'; Davies (yellow card) 62'; Moimbé (red card) 82'	Stadium: Ewood Park; Attendance: 13,665; Referee: Darren Drysdale

13 February 2018 33	Oldham Athletic	1–0	Milton Keynes Dons	Oldham
19:45 GMT	Gerrard 40'	Report	Upson (yellow card) 32'; Nesbitt (yellow card) 90'; Ebanks-Landell (yellow card) 90+2'	Stadium: Boundary Park; Attendance: 3,381; Referee: Tom Nield

24 February 2018 P	Oldham Athletic	P–P	Southend United	Oldham
15:00 GMT		Report		Stadium: Boundary Park; Referee: David Webb

3 March 2018 34	Scunthorpe United	0–2	Oldham Athletic	Scunthorpe
15:00 GMT	Williams (yellow card) 80'	Report	Gerrard (yellow card) 38'; McEleney 78'; Doyle 82'	Stadium: Glanford Park; Attendance: 3,715; Referee: John Busby

10 March 2018 35	Bury	2–2	Oldham Athletic	Bury
15:00 GMT	O'Shea 14'; Danns 34'; Thompson (yellow card) 86'	Report	Moimbé (yellow card) 10'; Davies 42'; Pringle 77'; Byrne (yellow card) 82'	Stadium: Gigg Lane; Attendance: 5,904; Referee: Andy Woolmer

17 March 2018 36	Oldham Athletic	0–2	Portsmouth	Oldham
15:00 GMT		Report	Pitman 29', 42' (yellow card) 90+5'; Clarke (yellow card) 47'; Donohue (yellow card) 90+9'	Stadium: Boundary Park; Attendance: 4,306; Referee: Seb Stockbridge

30 March 2018 37	Wigan Athletic	3–0	Oldham Athletic	Wigan
13:00 BST	Grigg 40'; Vaughan 49'; Powell 66'	Report	Pringle (yellow card) 24'; Gardner (yellow card) 30'; Doyle (yellow card) 83'	Stadium: DW Stadium; Attendance: 10,625; Referee: Robert Jones

2 April 2018 38	Oldham Athletic	2–1	Blackpool	Oldham
	Byrne 60', (yellow card) 90'; McEleney (yellow card) 54'; Gardner (yellow card) 71'; Edmundson (yellow card) 78'; Doyle 85'	Report	Vassell 37'; Spearing (yellow card) 81'; Solomon-Otabor (yellow card) 90'	Stadium: Boundary Park; Attendance: 4,309; Referee: Darren Drysdale

7 April 2018 39	Oxford United	0–0	Oldham Athletic	Oxford
15:00 BST	Thomas (yellow card) 66'	Report	Fané (yellow card) 41'; Moimbé (yellow card) 60'	Stadium: Kassam Stadium; Attendance: 7,096 (492 away); Referee: Eddie Ilderton

11 April 2018 40	Oldham Athletic	1–1	Walsall	Oldham
	Nazon 45'; Holloway (yellow card) 79'	Report	Fitzwater 34'; Devlin (yellow card) 78'	Stadium: Boundary Park

14 April 2018 41	Oldham Athletic	1–1	Gillingham	Oldham
15:00 BST	Fané (yellow card) 26'; Nazon 45'; Byrne (yellow card) 70'; Edmundson (yellow card) 79'; Hunt (yellow card) 89'; Moimbé (red card) 90'	Report	Eaves 90+2' (pen.)	Stadium: Boundary Park; Attendance: 3,850; Referee: Michael Salisbury

17 April 2018 42	Rochdale	0–0	Oldham Athletic	Rochdale
19:45 BST	Thompson (yellow card) 55'	Report	Fané (yellow card) 38'; Hunt (yellow card) 55'; Edmundson (yellow card) 57'; Hamer (yellow card) 76'; Gardner (yellow card) 80'	Stadium: Spotland Stadium; Attendance: 6,261; Referee: Peter Bankes

21 April 2018 43	AFC Wimbledon	2–2	Oldham Athletic	Kingston upon Thames
15:00 BST	Meades 10'; Pigott 68'; Oshilaja (yellow card) 90'	Report	Doyle (yellow card) 45'; Nazon 50', 74'; Byrne (yellow card) 83'	Stadium: Kingsmeadow; Attendance: 4,850; Referee: Andy Davies

24 April 2018 44	Oldham Athletic	0-3	Southend United	Oldham
19:45 BST	Doyle (yellow card) 81'; Byrne (yellow card) 85'	Report	Robinson 5'; Cox 52', 56'; Demetriou (yellow card) 71'	Stadium: Boundary Park; Attendance: 3,362; Referee: David Webb

28 April 2018 45	Oldham Athletic	0-0	Doncaster Rovers	Oldham
15:00 BST	Benyu (yellow card) 86'	Report	Whiteman (yellow card) 71'	Stadium: Boundary Park; Attendance: 5,297; Referee: Chris Sarginson

5 May 2018 46	Northampton Town	2-2	Oldham Athletic	Northampton
19:45 BST	Grimes 42' (pen.); Taylor 45+4'; McWilliams (yellow card) 29'	Report	Edmundson 29'; Gardner (yellow card) 29'; Hamer 55'	Stadium: Sixfields Stadium; Attendance: 6,511; Referee: Keith Stroud

=== FA Cup ===
On 16 October 2017, Oldham Athletic were drawn away to Carlisle United in the first round.

4 November 2017 First round	Carlisle United	3–2	Oldham Athletic	Carlisle
15:00 GMT	Bennett 22', 60'; Hope 36'	Report	Clarke 64'; Amadi-Holloway 72'; Davies (yellow card) 90+4'	Stadium: Brunton Park; Attendance: 3,965; Referee: Andy Haines

=== EFL Cup ===
On 16 June 2017, Oldham Athletic were drawn at home to Burton Albion in the first round.

9 August 2017 First round	Oldham Athletic	2–3	Burton Albion	Oldham
19:45 BST	Green 55'; Davies 67' (pen.)	Report	Varney 47'; Lund 69'; Akins 86' (pen.)	Stadium: Boundary Park; Attendance: 2,176; Referee: Scott Duncan

=== EFL Trophy ===
On 12 July 2017, the group stage draw was completed with Oldham facing Crewe Alexandra, Newcastle United U23s and Port Vale in Northern Group D.

Pos	Lge	Team	Pld	W	PW	PL	L	GF	GA	GD	Pts	Qualification
1	L2	Port Vale (Q)	3	2	1	0	0	5	2	+3	8	Round 2
2	L1	Oldham Athletic (Q)	3	2	0	1	0	5	1	+4	7	Round 2
3	ACA	Newcastle United U21s (E)	3	1	0	0	2	3	6	−3	3	
4	L2	Crewe Alexandra (E)	3	0	0	0	3	3	7	−4	0	

Updated to match(es) played on 7 November 2017. Source: EFL.com
(E) Eliminated; (Q) Qualified to the phase indicated

29 August 2017 Group Game 1	Oldham Athletic	0–0 (2–4 p)	Port Vale	Oldham
19:30 BST		Report		Stadium: Boundary Park; Attendance: 1,429
	Penalties
	Gerrard (penalty scored); Fawns (penalty missed); Gardner (penalty scored)		Tonge (penalty scored); Gunning (penalty scored); Pope (penalty scored); Denton (penalty scored)

3 October 2017 Group Game 2	Crewe Alexandra	0–1	Oldham Athletic	Crewe
19:30 BST	Porter (yellow card) 34'; Stubbs (yellow card) 69'	Report	Byrne (yellow card) 38' (goal) 42'	Stadium: Gresty Road; Attendance: 976; Referee: Seb Stockbridge

7 November 2017 Group Game 3	Oldham Athletic	4–1	Newcastle United U21s	Oldham
19:30 GMT	Byrne 13', 63' (yellow card) 45'; Gerrard (yellow card) 38'; Doyle 61', 69'	Report	Aarons 78'	Stadium: Boundary Park; Attendance: 1,107; Referee: Carl Boyseon

5 December 2017 Second round	Bradford City	0–1	Oldham Athletic	Bradford
19:30 GMT		Report	Obadeyi 3'; Green (yellow card) 42'	Stadium: Valley Parade; Attendance: 1,036; Referee: David Webb

17 January 2018 Third round	Oldham Athletic	4–2	Leicester City U21	Oldham
19:30 GMT	Davies 50' 56'; Gerrard 76'; Obadeyi 86'	Report	Knight 43'; Musa 68'	Stadium: Boundary Park; Attendance: 4,192; Referee: Darren Handley

23 January 2018 Fourth round	Shrewsbury Town	2–1	Oldham Athletic	Shrewsbury
19:00 GMT	Payne 1'; Rodman 88'	Report	Amadi-Holloway 67'; Gardner (yellow card) 82'	Stadium: New Meadow; Attendance: 1,984; Referee: Darren Handley
