= 2016–17 Oldham Athletic A.F.C. season =

Oldham Athletic
2016–17 season
- Chairman: Simon Corney
- Manager: Steve Robinson (until 12 January); John Sheridan (from 12 January)
- Stadium: Boundary Park
- League One: 17th
- FA Cup: Second round (eliminated by Lincoln City)
- EFL Cup: Second round (eliminated by Preston North End)
- EFL Trophy: Third round
- Top goalscorer: League: Lee Erwin (8); All: Lee Erwin (10)
- Highest home attendance: 8,788 (15 April 2017 vs Bolton Wanderers)
- Lowest home attendance: 1,897 (30 August 2016 vs Carlisle United)
Home colours	Away colours

The 2016–17 season was Oldham Athletic's 122nd season in their history and 20th consecutive season in League One. Along with competing in League One, the club also participated in the FA Cup, EFL Cup and EFL Trophy.

The season covers the period from 1 July 2016 to 30 June 2017.

== Transfers ==
=== Transfers in ===
Date from	Position	Nationality	Name	From	Fee	Ref.
9 July 2016	RB	(England)	Josh Law	Motherwell	Free transfer	
11 July 2016	LB	(England)	Jamie Reckord	Free agent	Free transfer	
11 July 2016	CM	(Philippines)	Luke Woodland	Bradford Park Avenue	Free transfer	
12 July 2016	GK	(Scotland)	Chris Kettings	Crystal Palace	Free transfer	
13 July 2016	RW	(Scotland)	Ryan Flynn	Sheffield United	Free transfer	
13 July 2016	DM	(Netherlands)	Marc Klok	Cherno More Varna	Free transfer	
19 July 2016	AM	(England)	Ollie Banks	Chesterfield	Free transfer	
19 July 2016	CB	(England)	Peter Clarke	Bury	Free transfer	
28 July 2016	CM	(Republic of Ireland)	Paul Green	Rotherham United	Free transfer	
29 July 2016	CF	(England)	Darius Osei	Stalybridge Celtic	Undisclosed	
3 August 2016	DM	(France)	Ousmane Fane	Kidderminster Harriers	£50,000	
8 August 2016	RB	(Northern Ireland)	Ryan McLaughlin	Liverpool	Free transfer	
12 August 2016	LB	(Republic of Ireland)	Charles Dunne	Blackpool	Free transfer	
12 August 2016	RW	(Antigua and Barbuda)	Calaum Jahraldo-Martin	Hull City	Free transfer	
31 August 2016	RB	(Northern Ireland)	Cameron Dummigan	Burnley	Undisclosed	
20 January 2017	CF	(Wales)	Aaron Amadi-Holloway	Fleetwood Town	Undisclosed	
20 January 2017	CB	(Republic of Ireland)	Anthony Gerrard	Free agent	Free transfer	
20 January 2017	CF	(England)	Michael Ngoo	Bromley	Free transfer	
31 January 2017	LW	(England)	Tope Obadeyi	Dundee United	Free transfer	

=== Transfers out ===
Date from	Position	Nationality	Name	To	Fee	Ref.
1 July 2016	CF	(England)	Jordan Bove	Free agent	Released	
1 July 2016	GK	(England)	Joel Coleman	Huddersfield Town	Undisclosed	
1 July 2016	GK	(Wales)	David Cornell	Northampton Town (Note: Following Cornell's release, he signed for Northampton Town.)	Released	
1 July 2016	LW	(Barbados)	Jonathan Forte	Notts County	Free transfer	
1 July 2016	RM	(England)	Mike Jones	Carlisle United (Note: Following Jones' release, he signed for Carlisle United.)	Released	
1 July 2016	LB	(England)	Joseph Mills	Perth Glory (Note: Following Mills' release, he signed for Perth Glory.)	Released	
1 July 2016	CF	(England)	Dominic Poleon	AFC Wimbledon	Free transfer	
1 July 2016	LB	(England)	Jack Truelove	Free agent	Released	
1 July 2016	CF	(England)	Rhys Turner	Morecambe (Note: Following Turner's release, he signed for Morecambe.)	Released	
1 July 2016	CB	(England)	Theo Vassell	Walsall (Note: Following Vassell's release, he signed for Walsall.)	Released	
2 July 2016	CM	(Scotland)	Liam Kelly	Leyton Orient	Undisclosed	
5 July 2016	CB	(Wales)	James Wilson	Sheffield United	Free transfer	
7 July 2016	CF	(Republic of Ireland)	Rhys Murphy	Forest Green Rovers	Nominal fee	
13 July 2016	DM	(France)	Timothée Dieng	Bradford City	Free transfer	
31 August 2016	RB	(England)	Connor Brown	Free Agent	Released	
12 January 2017	RM	(Northern Ireland)	Carl Winchester	Cheltenham Town	Free transfer	
31 January 2017	DM	(Netherlands)	Marc Klok	Dundee	Free transfer	

=== Loans in ===
Date from	Position	Nationality	Name	From	Date until	Ref.
9 July 2016	CF	(Scotland)	Lee Erwin	Leeds United	End of Season	
9 July 2016	GK	(England)	Connor Ripley	Middlesbrough	End of Season	
13 July 2016	CF	(Northern Ireland)	Billy Mckay	Wigan Athletic	31 January 2017	(Note: On 31 January 2017, Billy Mckay's loan was terminated.)
18 July 2016	CB	(Australia)	Cameron Burgess	Fulham	5 January 2017	
30 August 2016	CF	(Nigeria)	Freddie Ladapo	Crystal Palace	2 January 2017	
26 January 2017	RB	(England)	Rob Hunt	Brighton & Hove Albion	End of Season	
31 January 2017	CM	(Australia)	Aiden O'Neill	Burnley	End of Season	
31 January 2017	LM	(England)	Chris Taylor	Bolton Wanderers	End of Season	

=== Loans out ===
Date from	Position	Nationality	Name	To	Date until	Ref.
27 September 2016	CB	(England)	Jamie Scott	Curzon Ashton	End of Season (Note: On 3 November 2016, Jamie Scott's loan at Curzon Ashton was extended until 30 January 2017.) (Note: On 27 January 2017, Jamie Scott's loan at Curzon Ashton was extended until the end of season.)	

== Competitions ==
=== Pre-season friendlies ===
16 July 2016 Friendly	Oldham Athletic	0–2	Huddersfield Town	Oldham
15:00 BST		Report	Bunn 72'; Payne 90'	Stadium: Boundary Park; Attendance: 2,163 (814 visiting supporters)

19 July 2016 Friendly	Oldham Athletic	1–3	Preston North End	Oldham
19:00 BST	Trialist 71'	Report	Doyle 20'; Garner 70', 74' (pen.)	Stadium: Boundary Park

23 July 2016 Friendly	AFC Fylde	1–0	Oldham Athletic	Fylde
15:00 BST	Crainey 50'			Stadium: Kellamergh Park; Attendance: 512

26 July 2016 Friendly	Oldham Athletic	0–1	Wigan Athletic	Oldham
19:30 BST		Report	Jacobs 77'	Stadium: Boundary Park; Attendance: 954 (130 visiting supporters)

=== League One ===
==== League table ====
Pos	Team	Pld	W	D	L	GF	GA	GD	Pts
15	AFC Wimbledon	46	13	18	15	52	55	−3	57
16	Northampton Town	46	14	11	21	60	73	−13	53
17	Oldham Athletic	46	12	17	17	31	44	−13	53
18	Shrewsbury Town	46	13	12	21	46	63	−17	51
19	Bury	46	13	11	22	61	73	−12	50

Source: BBC Sport
Rules for classification: 1) Points; 2) Goal difference; 3) Number of goals scored

==== Matches ====
6 August 2016 1	Millwall	3–0	Oldham Athletic	Bermondsey, London
15:00 BST	Gregory 13'; O'Brien 45+3'; Webster 46'	Report		Stadium: The Den; Attendance: 9,787 (312 visiting supporters); Referee: Roger East

13 August 2016 2	Oldham Athletic	0–0	Walsall	Oldham
15:00 BST	Law (yellow card) 87'	Report	Osbourne (yellow card) 89'	Stadium: Boundary Park; Attendance: 3,914

16 August 2016 3	Oldham Athletic	0–0	Northampton Town	Oldham
19:45 BST	Clarke (yellow card) 84'	Report	O'Toole (yellow card) 65'; Taylor (yellow card) 67'; Zakuani (yellow card) 69'; Richards (yellow card) 84'; Diamond (yellow card) 86'; Phillips (yellow card) 90+4'	Stadium: Boundary Park; Attendance: 3,327

20 August 2016 4	Bury	0–1	Oldham Athletic	Bury
15:00 BST	Jones (yellow card) 57'	Report	Barnett 10' (o.g.); Klok (yellow card) 64'; Fané (yellow card) 90'	Stadium: Gigg Lane; Attendance: 4,479 (1,554 visiting supporters)

27 August 2016 5	Bradford City	1–1	Oldham Athletic	Bradford
15:00 BST	Clarke 57' (pen.)	Report	Clarke 5'; Law (yellow card) 35'; Klok (yellow card) 53'; Flynn (yellow card) 56'; Mckay (yellow card) 68'; Ripley (yellow card) 74'	Stadium: Valley Parade; Attendance: 17,793 (685 visiting supporters)

3 September 2016 6	Oldham Athletic	2–3	Shrewsbury Town	Oldham
15:00 BST	Law 24'; Fané (yellow card) 37' (yellow-red card) 70'; Clarke (yellow card) 60'; Erwin 82'	Report	Ogogo (yellow card) 36'; Brown 43'; Toney 50' (pen.); Riley 62'	Stadium: Boundary Park; Attendance: 3,697

10 September 2016 7	Oldham Athletic	0–0	Chesterfield	Oldham
15:00 BST	Erwin (yellow card) 21'; Clarke (yellow card) 28'; Flynn (yellow card) 48'	Report	Wilkinson (yellow card) 19'; Anderson (yellow card) 39'; Dimaio (yellow card) 64'	Stadium: Boundary Park; Attendance: 3,457

17 September 2016 8	Coventry City	0–0	Oldham Athletic	Coventry
15:00	Gadzhev (yellow card) 45'; Bigirimana (yellow card) 62'	Report	Green (yellow card) 41'; Dunne (yellow card) 64'	Stadium: Ricoh Arena; Attendance: 8,813 (453 visiting supporters)

24 September 2016 9	Oldham Athletic	0–2	Swindon Town	Oldham
15:00 BST	Banks (yellow card) 32'; Fané (yellow card) 82'; Burgess (yellow card) 86'	Report	Thompson (yellow card) 6'; Obika 18'; Ormonde-Ottewill 55'	Stadium: Boundary Park; Attendance: 3,403

27 September 2016 10	Charlton Athletic	1–1	Oldham Athletic	Charlton, London
19:45 BST	Magennis 22'	Report	Clarke 83'	Stadium: The Valley; Attendance: 8,745; Referee: Nick Kinseley

1 October 2016 11	Oldham Athletic	0–2	Milton Keynes Dons	Oldham
15:00 BST	Clarke (yellow card) 54'; Flynn (yellow card) 68'	Report	Baldock (yellow card) 34'; Reeves 36'; Agard 55'; Potter (yellow card) 63'	Stadium: Boundary Park; Attendance: 3,273; Referee: Jeremy Simpson

8 October 2016 12	Gillingham	1–2	Oldham Athletic	Gillingham
15:00 BST	McDonald 10'; Wagstaff (yellow card) 19'; Dack (yellow card) 38'; Herd (yellow card) 62'; Nouble (yellow card) 68'; Nelson (yellow card) 90'	Report	Ladapo 65' (yellow card) 65'; Flynn 89'	Stadium: MEMS Priestfield Stadium; Attendance: 6,435; Referee: Kevin Johnson

15 October 2016 13	Bolton Wanderers	2–0	Oldham Athletic	Bolton
15:00 BST	Clough 10', 77'	Report	Burgess (yellow card) 82'	Stadium: Macron Stadium; Attendance: 14,891; Referee: Carl Boyeson

18 October 2016 14	Oldham Athletic	2–0	Scunthorpe United	Oldham
19:45 BST	Ladapo 42'; Erwin 45+1'; Dummigan (yellow card) 87'	Report	Bishop (yellow card) 45+2'; Morris (yellow card) 90+5'	Stadium: Boundary Park; Attendance: 2,911; Referee: Darren England

22 October 2016 15	Oldham Athletic	0–2	Bristol Rovers	Oldham
15:00 BST	Flynn (yellow card) 57'	Report	Colkett 25'; Gaffney (yellow card) 80'; Clarke-Salter 87'	Stadium: Boundary Park; Attendance: 4,394; Referee: Seb Stockbridge

29 October 2016 16	Rochdale	1–0	Oldham Athletic	Rochdale
15:00 BST	Lund 40'	Report	Burgess (yellow card) 15'; Dummigan (yellow card) 65'; McLaughlin (yellow card) 90+4'	Stadium: Crown Oil Arena; Attendance: 5,204; Referee: Tony Harrington

12 November 2016 17	Oldham Athletic	0–0	AFC Wimbledon	Oldham
15:00 GMT		Report	Reeves (yellow card) 83'	Stadium: Boundary Park; Attendance: 3,856; Referee: Darren Deadman

19 November 2016 18	Scunthorpe United	1–0	Oldham Athletic	Scunthorpe
15:00 GMT	van Veen (yellow card) 38'; Wiseman 80'	Report	Green (yellow card) 58' (yellow-red card) 65'; Banks (yellow card) 67'; Ripley (yellow card) 79'; Fané (yellow card) 90+3'	Stadium: Glanford Park; Attendance: 4,323; Referee: Graham Salisbury

22 November 2016 19	Port Vale	2–2	Oldham Athletic	Stoke-on-Trent
19:45 GMT	Paulo Tavares (yellow card) 38'; Streete 51'; Knops (yellow card) 54'; Cicilia 78'	Report	Banks 48'; Fané (yellow card) 63'; Winchester 90+4' (yellow card) 90+5'	Stadium: Vale Park; Attendance: 3,152; Referee: Darren England

10 December 2016 20	Oxford United	1–1	Oldham Athletic	Oxford
15:00 GMT	Johnson (yellow card) 39'; Hall 54' (yellow card) 64'	Report	Burgess 10'; Fané (yellow card) 17' (yellow-red card) 58'; Banks (yellow card) 63'; McLaughlin (yellow card) 78'; Ripley (yellow card) 90+2'	Stadium: The Kassam Stadium; Attendance: 7,430; Referee: Brett Huxtable

17 December 2016 21	Oldham Athletic	0–2	Southend United	Oldham
15:00 GMT	Croft (yellow card) 50'; Winchester (yellow card) 86'; Clarke (yellow card) 90+1'	Report	Ranger 18'; McGlashan 76'	Stadium: Boundary Park; Attendance: 3,414; Referee: Christopher Sarginson

26 December 2016 22	Sheffield United	2–0	Oldham Athletic	Sheffield
15:00 GMT	Ebanks-Landell (yellow card) 70'; Sharp 72', 88'	Report	Flynn (yellow card) 26'; Osei (yellow card) 57'; Dummigan (yellow card) 65'	Stadium: Bramall Lane; Attendance: 25,821; Referee: Mark Heywood

31 December 2016 23	Fleetwood Town	1–0	Oldham Athletic	Fleetwood
15:00 GMT	Ball (yellow card) 71'; McLaughlin (yellow card) 82'; Law 90+1' (o.g.)	Report	Burgess (yellow card) 57'	Stadium: Highbury Stadium; Attendance: 3,189; Referee: Darren Handley

2 January 2017 24	Oldham Athletic	0–0	Port Vale	Oldham
15:00 GMT	Banks (yellow card) 27'	Report	Knops (yellow card) 4'; Kelly (yellow card) 19'; Grant (yellow card) 40'; Streete (yellow card) 51'	Stadium: Boundary Park; Attendance: 3,451; Referee: Richard Clark

14 January 2017 25	Oldham Athletic	1–0	Gillingham	Oldham
15:00 GMT	Law 39'; Wilson (yellow card) 70'	Report	Konchesky (yellow card) 38'; McDonald (yellow card) 82'; Dack (yellow card) 89'	Stadium: Boundary Park; Attendance: 3,475; Referee: Dean Whitestone

21 January 2017 26	Shrewsbury Town	1–0	Oldham Athletic	Shrewsbury
15:00 GMT	Ladapo 68'	Report	Fané (yellow card) 24'; Clarke (yellow card) 44'; Gerrard (yellow card) 80'	Stadium: Greenhous Meadow; Attendance: 5,537; Referee: Mark Haywood

24 January 2017 27	Oldham Athletic	2–0	Peterborough United	Oldham
19:45 GMT	Amadi-Holloway (yellow card) 40'; Gerrard (yellow card) 54'; Green 69' (pen.); McLaughlin 82'	Report		Stadium: Boundary Park; Attendance: 7,224; Referee: John Brooks

28 January 2017 28	Oldham Athletic	1–2	Bradford City	Oldham
15:00 GMT	Wilson 44'; Banks (yellow card) 60'	Report	Vincelot 14'; McArdle 76'	Stadium: Boundary Park; Attendance: 6,516; Referee: Nigel Miller

4 February 2017 29	Chesterfield	0–1	Oldham Athletic	Chesterfield
15:00 GMT		Report	Gerrard (yellow card) 31' (yellow-red card) 45+3'; Clarke (yellow card) 86' (goal) 90+1'; Ripley (yellow card) 86'; Amadi-Holloway (yellow card) 90+3'	Stadium: Proact Stadium; Attendance: 6,375; Referee: Ross Joyce

7 February 2017 30	Milton Keynes Dons	1–0	Oldham Athletic	Milton Keynes
19:45 GMT	Baldock (yellow card) 4'; Maynard 90+6'	Report	Clarke (yellow card) 61'	Stadium: stadium:mk Attendance: 7,598; Referee: Darren Handley

11 February 2017 31	Oldham Athletic	3–2	Coventry City	Oldham
15:00 GMT	Foley 8' (o.g.); Clarke 66'; McLaughlin 70'	Report	Tudgay 9'; Gadzhev (yellow card) 21'; Rawson (yellow card) 67'; Thomas 76'	Stadium: Boundary Park; Attendance: 3,766; Referee: Ben Toner

14 February 2017 32	Oldham Athletic	1–0	Charlton Athletic	Oldham
19:45 GMT	Banks 4'	Report	Solly (yellow card) 75'; Bauer (yellow card) 76'	Stadium: Boundary Park; Attendance: 2,946; Referee: Mark Brown

18 February 2017 33	Swindon Town	0–0	Oldham Athletic	Swindon
15:00 GMT	Ince (yellow card) 72'; Gladwin (yellow card) 76'; Barry (yellow card) 90+2'	Report	O'Neill (yellow card) 9'	Stadium: County Ground; Attendance: 6,773; Referee: Robert Lewis

25 February 2017 34	Oldham Athletic	0–0	Millwall	Oldham
15:00 GMT	O'Neill (yellow card) 76'; Taylor (yellow card) 89'; Ngoo (yellow card) 90+4'	Report	Williams (yellow card) 84'	Stadium: Boundary Park; Attendance: 3,856; Referee: Carl Boyeson

28 February 2017 35	Northampton Town	1–2	Oldham Athletic	Northampton
19:45 GMT	Taylor (yellow card) 24'; O'Toole 84'	Report	Tope 23'; Banks (yellow card) 74'; Erwin 90+2' (yellow card) 90+3'	Stadium: Sixfields Stadium; Attendance: 4,686; Referee: Brett Huxtable

4 March 2017 36	Walsall	2–0	Oldham Athletic	Walsall
15:00 GMT	Etheridge (yellow card) 59'; Oztumer 79' (pen.); Bakayoko (yellow card) 82' (goal) 90+2'	Report	Croft (red card) 16'; Wilson (yellow card) 39' (yellow-red card) 82'; Clarke (yellow card) 78'	Stadium: The Banks's Stadium; Attendance: 6,003; Referee: John Brooks

11 March 2017 37	Oldham Athletic	0–0	Bury	Oldham
15:00 GMT		Report	Styles (yellow card) 45'	Stadium: Boundary Park; Attendance: 5,776; Referee: Darren Bond

14 March 2017 38	Oldham Athletic	2–1	Oxford United	Oldham
19:45 GMT	Gerrard (yellow card) 26'; Banks (yellow card) 35'; Erwin 36', 70'	Report	Maguire 60' (pen.); Nelson (yellow card) 68'	Stadium: Boundary Park; Attendance: 3,124; Referee: Darren Drysdale

18 March 2017 39	Peterborough United	1–1	Oldham Athletic	Peterborough
15:00 GMT	Baldwin (yellow card) 54'; Morias (yellow card) 67' (goal) 73'; Binnom-Williams (yellow card) 75'	Report	Erwin 11'	Stadium: ABAX Stadium; Attendance: 4,222; Referee: Lee Swabey

25 March 2017 40	Oldham Athletic	1–1	Sheffield United	Oldham
15:00 GMT	Fané (yellow card) 42'; Obadeyi 44'	Report	Basham (yellow card) 21'; O'Shea 50'; Freeman (yellow card) 71'	Stadium: Boundary Park; Attendance: 8,448; Referee: Eddie Ilderton

1 April 2017 41	Southend United	3–0	Oldham Athletic	Southend-on-Sea
15:00 GMT	Wordsworth (yellow card) 21' (goal) 90+6' (pen.); Cox (yellow card) 44'; Coker (yellow card) 69'; Leonard (red card) 70'; Ranger 75'; Robinson 78'	Report	Banks (yellow card) 63'; Green (yellow card) 69'; McLaughlin (yellow card) 78'; Ripley (yellow card) 90+5'	Stadium: Roots Hall; Attendance: 7,617; Referee: Kevin Johnson

8 April 2017 42	Oldham Athletic	2–0	Fleetwood Town	Oldham
15:00 BST	Pond 25' (o.g.); Gerrard (yellow card) 27'; Erwin 55'	Report	Davies (yellow card) 40'; Bolger (yellow card) 66'	Stadium: Boundary Park; Attendance: 3,933; Referee: Nigel Miller

15 April 2017 43	Oldham Athletic	1–0	Bolton Wanderers	Oldham
12:30 BST	Ngoo (yellow card) 54' (yellow-red card) 64'; Erwin 76'	Report	Dervite (yellow card) 50'	Stadium: Boundary Park; Attendance: 8,788; Referee: Peter Bankes

17 April 2017 44	Bristol Rovers	1–0	Oldham Athletic	Bristol
15:00 BST	Sinclair (yellow card) 63'; Harrison 75'	Report		Stadium: Memorial Stadium; Attendance: 9,083; Referee: Chris Sarginson

22 April 2017 45	Oldham Athletic	1–1	Rochdale	Oldham
15:00 BST	Clarke 67'; Fané (yellow card) 88'	Report	Camps 13'; Vincenti (yellow card) 90+4'	Stadium: Boundary Park; Attendance: 6,865; Referee: Kevin Friend

30 April 2017 46	AFC Wimbledon	0–0	Oldham Athletic	Kingston upon Thames, London
12:00 GMT		Report	Ngoo (yellow card) 45+3'	Stadium: Kingsmeadow; Attendance: 4,867; Referee: Nick Kinseley

=== FA Cup ===
5 November 2016 First round	Oldham Athletic	2–1	Doncaster Rovers	Oldham
15:00 GMT	Flynn 45+1'; Mckay 53'; Dummigan (yellow card) 84'	Report	Mandeville 90+4' (pen.)	Stadium: Boundary Park; Attendance: 2,984; Referee: David Webb

5 December 2016 Second round	Lincoln City	3–2	Oldham Athletic	Lincoln
19:45 GMT	Robinson 22', 47'; Hawkridge 24'; Power (yellow card) 90+2'; Anderson (yellow card) 90+6'	Report	Dummigan (yellow card) 3'; Clarke 70'; Mckay 73'; Erwin (yellow card) 84'	Stadium: Sincil Bank Stadium; Attendance: 7,012; Referee: Gavin Ward

=== EFL Cup ===
9 August 2016 First round	Oldham Athletic	2–1	Wigan Athletic	Oldham
19:45 BST	Flynn 18'; Klok (yellow card) 41'; Law 83'	Report	Grigg 34'; Buxton (red card) 45+2'	Stadium: Boundary Park; Attendance: 2,554

23 August 2016 Second round	Preston North End	2–0	Oldham Athletic	Preston
19:45 BST	Doyle 66'; Hugill 81'	Report	Erwin (yellow card) 87'	Stadium: Deepdale; Attendance: 5,075 (751 visiting supporters)

=== EFL Trophy ===
Pos	Div	Team	Pld	W	PW	PL	L	GF	GA	GD	Pts	Qualification
1	L2	Carlisle United	3	3	0	0	0	11	6	+5	9	Advance to Round 2
2	L1	Oldham Athletic	3	1	1	0	1	8	7	+1	5	Advance to Round 2
3	L1	Fleetwood Town	3	1	0	0	2	3	6	−3	3	
4	ACA	Blackburn Rovers U21	3	0	0	1	2	2	5	−3	1	

Source: Sky Sports

30 August 2016 Group stage 1	Oldham Athletic	4–5	Carlisle United	Oldham
19:45 BST	Mckay 16'; Woodland (yellow card) 38'; Osei 48', 49'; Banks (yellow card) 60' (goal) 66'		Raynes 18', 89'; Lambe 22'; Burgess 28' (o.g.); Atkinson (yellow card) 71'; Miller (yellow card) 71' (goal) 74'; Gillesphey (red card) 82'	Stadium: Boundary Park

4 October 2016 Group stage 2	Fleetwood Town	0–2	Oldham Athletic	Fleetwood
19:45 BST		Report	Reckord (yellow card) 19'; Green (yellow card) 21'; Mckay 32'; Erwin 38' (yellow card) 62'	Stadium: Highbury Stadium; Attendance: 793; Referee: Darren Bond

8 November 2016 Group stage 3	Blackburn Rovers U23	2–2 (4–5 p)	Oldham Athletic	Blackburn
19:30 GMT	Stokes 22'; Feeney 61'	Report	Ladapo 49'; Wilson 67'; Fané (yellow card) 79'	Stadium: Ewood Park; Attendance: 471 (180 away); Referee: Rob Jones
	Penalties
	Stokes (penalty scored); Bennett (penalty scored); Tomlinson (penalty missed); Hardcastle (penalty scored); Mahoney (penalty scored); Feeney (penalty missed)		Banks (penalty scored); Law (penalty missed); Mckay (penalty scored); Ripley (penalty scored); McLaughlin (penalty scored); Croft (penalty scored)

13 December 2016 Second round	Walsall	1–3	Oldham Athletic	Walsall
19:45 GMT	Bakayoko 44'	Report	Croft 69'; Burgess 73'; Dunne (yellow card) 86'; Erwin 89'	Stadium: The Banks's Stadium; Attendance: 925; Referee: Nigel Miller

10 January 2017 Third round	Mansfield Town	2–0	Oldham Athletic	Mansfield
19:45 GMT	Benning (yellow card) 43'; Clements (yellow card) 57'; Hoban 84', 90+2'	Report	Edmundson (yellow card) 14'; Wilson (yellow card) 59'; Law (yellow card) 81'	Stadium: One Call Stadium; Attendance: 1,343; Referee: Darren Drysdale

== Statistics ==
=== Appearances and goals ===
No.	Pos	Nat	Player	Total		Premier League		FA Cup		League Cup		EFL Trophy	
No.	Pos	Nat	Player	Apps	Goals	Apps	Goals	Apps	Goals	Apps	Goals	Apps	Goals
Goalkeepers
1	GK	(England) ENG	Connor Ripley	54	0	46	0	2	0	2	0	4	0
13	GK	(Scotland) SCO	Chris Kettings	1	0	0	0	0	0	0	0	1	0
Defenders
2	DF	(England) ENG	Josh Law	28	3	19+3	2	0+1	0	2	1	3	0
3	DF	(England) ENG	Jamie Reckord	16	0	12+1	0	1	0	0	0	2	0
4	DF	(England) ENG	Brian Wilson	32	2	25+1	1	0	0	2	0	4	1
6	DF	(Republic of Ireland) IRL	Anthony Gerrard	14	0	14	0	0	0	0	0	0	0
15	DF	(England) ENG	George Edmundson	5	0	2+1	0	0	0	0	0	2	0
16	DF	(Northern Ireland) NIR	Cameron Dummigan	14	0	11+1	0	2	0	0	0	0	0
17	DF	(England) ENG	Kallum Mantack	1	0	0	0	0	0	1	0	0	0
20	DF	(England) ENG	Jamie Stott	4	0	4	0	0	0	0	0	0	0
22	DF	(England) ENG	Rob Hunt	10	0	9+1	0	0	0	0	0	0	0
26	DF	(England) ENG	Peter Clarke	53	6	46	5	2	1	2	0	3	0
27	DF	(Northern Ireland) NIR	Ryan McLaughlin	43	2	31+5	2	2	0	0+1	0	3+1	0
31	DF	(Republic of Ireland) IRL	Charles Dunne	19	0	13+1	0	1	0	1	0	3	0
Midfielders
6	MF	(Australia) AUS	Aiden O'Neill	15	0	12+3	0	0	0	0	0	0	0
7	MF	(Scotland) SCO	Ryan Flynn	44	3	31+6	1	0+1	1	1	1	5	0
8	MF	(England) ENG	Ollie Banks	34	3	24+1	2	2	0	1+1	0	3+2	1
11	MF	(England) ENG	Lee Croft	23	1	5+11	0	0+1	0	0+1	0	1+4	1
12	MF	(England) ENG	Chris Taylor	16	0	14+2	0	0	0	0	0	0	0
22	MF	(Philippines) PHI	Luke Woodland	2	0	0+1	0	0	0	0	0	1	0
24	MF	(France) FRA	Ousmane Fané	46	0	31+8	0	0+1	0	2	0	4	0
28	MF	(Republic of Ireland) IRL	Paul Green	47	1	36+5	1	2	0	1+1	0	2	0
30	MF	(England) ENG	Tope Obadeyi	15	2	10+5	2	0	0	0	0	0	0
Forwards
10	FW	(Wales) WAL	Aaron Amadi-Holloway	15	0	14+1	0	0	0	0	0	0	0
14	FW	(England) ENG	Michael Ngoo	13	0	3+10	0	0	0	0	0	0	0
18	FW	(England) ENG	Darius Osei	23	2	4+15	0	0+1	0	0+1	0	1+1	2
19	FW	(Scotland) SCO	Lee Erwin	40	10	25+9	8	2	0	2	0	1+1	2
30	FW	(Antigua and Barbuda) ANT	Calaum Jahraldo-Martin	5	0	0+4	0	0	0	0	0	1	0
33	FW	(Northern Ireland) NIR	Brendy Glackin	1	0	0+1	0	0	0	0	0	0	0
Players transferred out during the season
5	DF	(Australia) AUS	Cameron Burgess	31	2	23	1	2	0	2	0	4	1
6	MF	(Netherlands) NED	Marc Klok	12	0	6+4	0	0	0	2	0	0	0
9	FW	(Northern Ireland) NIR	Billy McKay	33	4	20+6	0	1+1	2	0	0	4+1	2
10	MF	(Northern Ireland) NIR	Carl Winchester	13	3	4+5	1	0	2	0	0	1+3	0
12	FW	(England) ENG	Freddie Ladapo	22	3	12+5	2	1	0	0	0	2+2	1
14	FW	(Wales) WAL	Jake Cassidy	2	0	0	0	0	0	1+1	0	0	0

Last updated: 30 June 2017
Source: Competitions
