= Mason Fawns =

English footballer (born 1999)

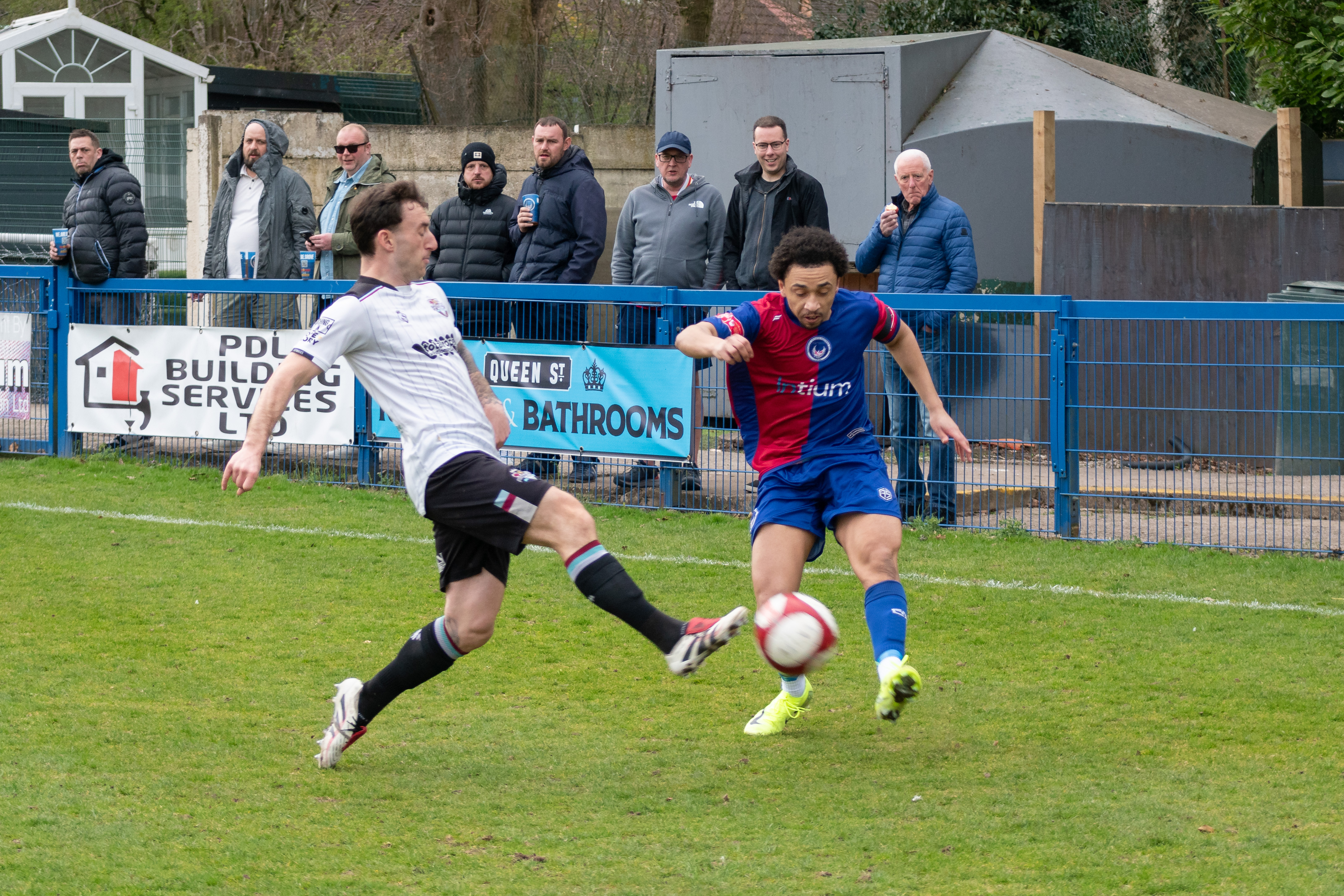
- Fawns (white jersey) playing for Mossley in 2025

Personal information
- Date of birth: 10 January 1999 (age 27)
- Place of birth: Manchester, England
- Position: Midfielder

Team information
- Current team: Mossley

Youth career
- Blackburn Rovers
- 2016–2017: Oldham Athletic

Senior career*
Years	Team	Apps	(Gls)
2017–2018	Oldham Athletic	4	(0)
2017	→ Ashton United (loan)	2	(1)
2018	→ AFC Fylde (loan)	0	(0)
2018–2019	Curzon Ashton	15	(1)
2019	Altrincham	2	(0)
2019	Trafford	4	(0)
2019–2021	Ramsbottom United	16	(3)
2021–2023	Mossley	71	(24)
2023	Bootle	7	(0)
2023–2024	Kidsgrove Athletic	18	(5)
2024–	Mossley	52	(16)
- * Club domestic league appearances and goals as of 23:43, 2 March 2026 (UTC)

Mason Fawns (born 10 January 1999) is an English semi-professional footballer who plays as a midfielder for Mossley. He previously played professionally in the English Football League for Oldham Athletic and has represented numerous non-League clubs in the Manchester area.

== Playing career ==
Fawns joined the youth team at Oldham Athletic after leaving the Academy at Blackburn Rovers in 2016. He scored four goals in 14 games for Tony Philliskirk's youth team before John Sheridan handed him his first professional (one-year) contract in June 2017. He made his first-team debut on 9 August, coming on as an 89th-minute substitute for Ousmane Fané in a 3–2 defeat to Burton Albion in a first round EFL Cup match at Boundary Park. He made his EFL League One debut three days later in a 2–1 defeat at Walsall. On 30 October, Fawns signed for Ashton United on a month long loan deal. He was loaned out to AFC Fylde on 18 January 2018 for the rest of the season.

Fawns was one of seven players released by Oldham at the end of the 2017–18 season following their relegation to League Two. He subsequently joined Curzon Ashton, where he played 15 times in the National League North and once in the FA Cup, scoring his only goal for the club in a 4–2 derby defeat against Ashton United on 26 December 2018. Fawns joined Altrincham on 6 February 2019 but made just two substitute appearances before transferring to Trafford, where he played four league matches.

Ahead of the 2019–20 season, Fawns signed for Northern Premier League West Division side Ramsbottom United. He played regularly during the first half of the season and scored his first Ramsbottom goal in a 7–1 win over Mossley on 26 December 2019. He had played 20 first-team matches by the time the season was abandoned following the outbreak of the COVID-19 pandemic. Following the relaxation of some pandemic restrictions, the 2020–21 season commenced as planned and Ramsbottom made a positive start, winning their first four league games of the campaign for the first time in the club's history. Fawns contributed to the team's success, scoring five goals in all competitions and being selected as the supporters' player of the month for October 2020 before the season was suspended following the announcement of a new COVID lockdown in England. The season was eventually abandoned again and all results expunged from the records, meaning that despite having played for Ramsbottom on 38 occasions he officially played no league matches during his time at the club.

Fawns joined Mossley in May 2021, with manager David Fish hoping to add more attacking ability to the squad. He went on to make 40 appearances in league and cup matches during the 2021–22 season, scoring seven goals including a hat-trick in a 7–1 win against Market Drayton Town on 25 September 2021. He remained with Mossley throughout the following campaign and enjoyed the most prolific goalscoring season of his career with 18 goals in all competitions. At the end of the season he was awarded Young Player of the Year for the NPL West Division and also named among the substitutes for the divisional team of the season.

Fawns began the 2023–24 season with Bootle, where he played seven league and four cup matches without scoring. He joined Staffordshire club Kidsgrove Athletic on 20 October 2023 along with defender Louis Holden, and made his debut the following day in a 3–1 defeat to Witton Albion. He made 18 league appearances over the remainder of the campaign and scored five goals, including the equaliser in a 1–1 draw against his former club Bootle on 10 February 2024. Fawns rejoined Mossley on 25 June 2024.

== Career statistics ==
As of match played 29 March 2025

Appearances and goals by club, season and competition
Club	Season	League			FA Cup		League Cup		Other		Total	
Club	Season	Division	Apps	Goals	Apps	Goals	Apps	Goals	Apps	Goals	Apps	Goals
Oldham Athletic	2017–18	League One	4	0	0	0	1	0	1 (Note: Appearance in the EFL Trophy)	0	6	0
Curzon Ashton	2018–19	National League North	15	1	1	0	–	–	0	0	16	1
Altrincham	2018–19	National League North	2	0	0	0	–	–	0	0	2	0
Trafford	2018–19	NPL West	4	0	0	0	–	–	0	0	4	0
Ramsbottom United	2019–20	NPL North West	Seasons abandoned due to the COVID-19 pandemic									
Ramsbottom United	2020–21	NPL North West	Seasons abandoned due to the COVID-19 pandemic									
Mossley	2021–22	NPL West	33	7	4	0	–	–	3 (Note: 2 appearances in the FA Trophy, 1 appearance in the Manchester Premier Cup)	0	40	7
Mossley	2022–23	NPL West	38	17	1	0	–	–	1 (Note: Appearances in the FA Trophy)	1	40	18
Bootle	2023–24	NPL West	7	0	1	0	–	–	3	0	11	0
Kidsgrove Athletic	2023–24	NPL West	18	5	0	0	–	–	0	0	18	5
Mossley	2024–25	NPL West	33	9	6	1	–	–	2 (Note: 1 appearance in the FA Trophy, 1 appearance in the Manchester Premier Cup)	0	41	10
Career total			154	39	13	1	1	0	10	1	178	41
