= Kallum Mantack =

English footballer

Kallum Kevin Mantack
Personal information
- Full name: Kallum Kevin Mantack
- Date of birth: 1 May 1998 (age 28)
- Place of birth: Wolverhampton, England
- Height: 6 ft 7 in (2.01 m)
- Positions: Winger; full back

Team information
- Current team: Matlock Town

Youth career
- 2014–2016: Oldham Athletic

Senior career*
Years	Team	Apps	(Gls)
2016–2018	Oldham Athletic	1	(0)
2016–2017	→ Alfreton Town (loan)	11	(0)
2017	→ F.C. United of Manchester (loan)	1	(0)
2017–2018	→ Stockport County (loan)	7	(2)
2018	Stockport County	6	(1)
2018–2019	Altrincham	5	(0)
2019	Ashton United	15	(3)
2019	Curzon Ashton	0	(0)
2019–2022	Stalybridge Celtic		
2022–	Matlock Town	0	(0)
- * Club domestic league appearances and goals as of 12:01, 11 October 2019 (UTC)

Kallum Kevin Mantack (born 1 May 1998) is an English professional footballer who plays as a winger or full back for Matlock Town. He previously played in the Football League for Oldham Athletic.

== Playing career ==
Mantack came through the Oldham Athletic youth team to sign his first professional contract in April 2016. He made his first-team debut in a 2–1 victory over Wigan Athletic in an EFL Cup match at Boundary Park on 9 August 2016. He joined Alfreton Town of the National League North on an initial one-month loan on 16 September 2016. After he secured a place in the Alfreton first team, his loan spell was extended until 15 January. He made 17 appearances in all competitions before returning to his parent club.

He made his Football League debut on 26 August 2017 away to Blackpool in League One; coming on after 56 minutes with his side 2–0 down, he "gave them some much needed impetus going forward" but the match ended 2–1. That proved to be his only League appearance for the club. He played once in the EFL Trophy and spent time on loan at two more National North club, F.C. United of Manchester and Stockport County. The latter spell ended prematurely when he received a broken fibula and dislocated ankle as the result of a tackle during a match against Alfreton in which he had scored the only goal. He was released by Oldham at the end of the season after their relegation to League Two.

Mantack signed a short-term contract with Stockport at the start of the 2018–19 season, and made seven appearances before moving on via a trial with Blackburn Rovers to another National North club, Altrincham. He made his debut on 24 November in an FA Trophy match against Bradford Park Avenue, coming on as a substitute and scoring in a 4–0 win. By February 2019, he had made seven appearances but had dropped down the pecking order so continued his tour of the National North with Ashton United. He made his debut in a 2–0 defeat to York City, and finished the season with three goals from 15 league appearances.

He signed for Curzon Ashton in June 2019, but left them for Stalybridge Celtic before the start of the new season. In August 2022, Mantack joined Matlock Town.

== Career statistics ==
As of match played 8 October 2019

Appearances and goals by club, season and competition
Club	Season	League			FA Cup		League Cup		Other		Total	
Club	Season	Division	Apps	Goals	Apps	Goals	Apps	Goals	Apps	Goals	Apps	Goals
Oldham Athletic	2016–17	League One	0	0	0	0	1	0	0	0	1	0
Oldham Athletic	2017–18	League One	1	0	0	0	0	0	1 (Note: Appearance in EFL Trophy)	0	2	0
Oldham Athletic	Total		1	0	0	0	1	0	1	0	3	0
Alfreton Town (loan)	2016–17	National League North	11	0	4	0	—		2 (Note: Appearances in FA Trophy)	0	17	0
FC United of Manchester (loan)	2017–18	National League North	1	0	1	0	—		0	0	2	0
Stockport County (loan)	2017–18	National League North	7	2	—		—		1	0	8	2
Stockport County	2018–19	National League North	6	1	1	0	—		0	0	7	1
Stockport County	Total		13	3	1	0	—		1	0	15	3
Altrincham	2018–19	National League North	5	0	—		—		2	1	7	1
Ashton United	2018–19	National League North	15	3	—		—		—		15	3
Stalybridge Celtic	2019–20	Northern Premier League Prem Div	30	1	3	0	—		4	0	37	1
Career total			76	7	9	0	1	0	10	1	96	8
