= Darius Osei =

English footballer (born 1995)

Personal information
- Full name: Darius Junior Osei
- Date of birth: 2 June 1995 (age 31)
- Position: Forward

Team information
- Current team: Ashton United

Youth career
- Stalybridge Celtic

Senior career*
| Years | Team | Apps | (Gls) |
| 2014–2016 | Stalybridge Celtic | 14 | (2) |
| 2016–2018 | Oldham Athletic | 22 | (1) |
| 2018 | Maidstone United | 6 | (0) |
| 2019–2020 | Stalybridge Celtic | 22 | (13) |
| 2020–2023 | South Shields | 83 | (26) |
| 2022 | → Ashton United (loan) | 6 | (3) |
| 2023 | Marine | 11 | (2) |
| 2023–2024 | Stalybridge Celtic | 19 | (5) |
| 2024– | Ashton United | 0 | (0) |
- * Club domestic league appearances and goals as of 14:16, 2 July 2024 (UTC)

Darius Junior Osei (born 2 June 1995) is an English professional footballer who plays for Ashton United as a striker.

== Career ==
After beginning his career with Stalybridge Celtic, he signed a one-year contract with Oldham Athletic in July 2016. He scored his first goals for Oldham when he scored twice in an EFL Trophy tie against Carlisle United on 30 August 2016.

On 9 January 2018, after being released by Oldham, Osei joined National League side Maidstone United on a deal until the end of the 2017–18 season. Osei featured nine times, scoring once before being released in May 2018.

in September 2019 he rejoined Stalybridge Celtic. In February 2020 he moved to South Shields. In October 2022, Osei joined Ashton United on loan. He signed for Marine in July 2023.

In November 2023, Osei returned to Stalybridge Celtic on a one-and-a-half-year deal for an undisclosed fee.

In June 2024, Osei returned to Ashton United on a permanent basis.

== Career statistics ==
As of end of 2023–24 season

Appearances and goals by club, season and competition
| Club | Season | League | | | FA Cup | | League Cup | | Other | | Total | |
| Club | Season | Division | Apps | Goals | Apps | Goals | Apps | Goals | Apps | Goals | Apps | Goals |
|---|---|---|---|---|---|---|---|---|---|---|---|---|
| Stalybridge Celtic | 2014–15 | Conference North | 2 | 1 | 0 | 0 | — | | 0 | 0 | 2 | 1 |
| Stalybridge Celtic | 2015–16 | National League North | 12 | 1 | 4 | 1 | — | | 1 (Note: Appearance(s) in FA Trophy) | 0 | 17 | 2 |
| Stalybridge Celtic | Total | | 14 | 2 | 4 | 1 | — | | 1 | 0 | 19 | 3 |
| Oldham Athletic | 2016–17 | League One | 19 | 0 | 1 | 0 | 1 | 0 | 2 (Note: Appearance(s) in EFL Trophy) | 2 | 23 | 2 |
| Oldham Athletic | 2017–18 | League One | 3 | 1 | 0 | 0 | 0 | 0 | 1 | 0 | 4 | 1 |
| Oldham Athletic | Total | | 22 | 1 | 1 | 0 | 1 | 0 | 3 | 2 | 27 | 3 |
| Maidstone United | 2017–18 | National League | 6 | 0 | 0 | 0 | — | | 3 | 1 | 9 | 1 |
| Stalybridge Celtic | 2019–20 | NPL Premier Division | 22 | 13 | 0 | 0 | — | | 1 | 0 | 23 | 13 |
| South Shields | 2019–20 | NPL Premier Division | 4 | 1 | 0 | 0 | — | | 0 | 0 | 4 | 1 |
| South Shields | 2020–21 | NPL Premier Division | 8 | 0 | 5 | 4 | — | | 1 | 0 | 14 | 4 |
| South Shields | 2021–22 | NPL Premier Division | 37 | 12 | 2 | 1 | — | | 2 (Note: One appearance in FA Trophy and one appearance, one goal in NPL Premier Division play-offs) | 1 | 41 | 13 |
| South Shields | 2022–23 | NPL Premier Division | 33 | 12 | 1 | 0 | — | | 1 | 0 | 35 | 12 |
| South Shields | Total | | 82 | 25 | 8 | 5 | 0 | 0 | 4 | 1 | 94 | 30 |
| Ashton United (loan) | 2022–23 | NPL Premier Division | 6 | 3 | 0 | 0 | — | | 0 | 0 | 6 | 3 |
| Marine | 2023–24 | NPL Premier Division | 11 | 2 | 6 | 0 | — | | 2 | 0 | 19 | 2 |
| Stalybridge Celtic | 2023–24 | NPL Division One West | 19 | 5 | 0 | 0 | — | | 0 | 0 | 19 | 5 |
| Career total | | | 182 | 51 | 19 | 6 | 1 | 0 | 14 | 4 | 216 | 60 |

== Honours ==
South Shields

- Northern Premier League: 2022–23
