= Kean Bryan =

English association football player

Personal information
- Full name: Kean Shay Bryan
- Date of birth: 1 November 1996 (age 30)
- Place of birth: Manchester, England
- Height: 6 ft 1 in (1.85 m)
- Positions: Defender; midfielder

Youth career
- 2008–2014: Manchester City

Senior career*
Years	Team	Apps	(Gls)
2014–2018	Manchester City	0	(0)
2016–2017	→ Bury (loan)	12	(0)
2017–2018	→ Oldham Athletic (loan)	21	(2)
2018	→ Oldham Athletic (loan)	11	(0)
2019–2021	Sheffield United	13	(1)
2020	→ Bolton Wanderers (loan)	6	(1)
2021–2023	West Bromwich Albion	3	(0)
Total		66	(4)

International career
2012	England U16	4	(1)
2012–2013	England U17	7	(2)
2014	England U19	1	(0)
2016–2017	England U20	2	(0)
- * Club domestic league appearances and goals

Kean Shay Bryan (born 1 November 1996) is an English former professional footballer who played as a central defender.

== Career ==
=== Manchester City ===
Bryan began his career at Manchester City at the age of 11, and went on to captain the club's development squad, where he was converted from a box-to-box midfielder into a centre-back.

After aborting an agreed loan to Dutch Eredivisie club NAC Breda, on 31 August 2016, he joined League One side Bury on loan for the rest of the 2016–17 season. He made his debut in the English Football League on 3 September, coming on as a 71st-minute substitute for Niall Maher in a 4–1 win over Port Vale at Gigg Lane. On 15 October he was sent off in a 2–0 loss at rivals Rochdale for a high tackle on Andy Cannon, prompting a mêlée of all 22 players.

On 31 August 2017, Bryan was loaned to Oldham Athletic until January 2018. On 16 January 2018, He returned to the club on loan for the rest of the season. On 17 May 2018, Bryan won the Oldham Athletic Young Player Of The Season award at the club's annual awards ceremony.

=== Sheffield United ===
On 2 August 2018, Bryan joined Sheffield United on a free transfer, signing a three-year contract. The deal included a sell-on clause. Bryan signed for League One club Bolton Wanderers on a six-month loan on 30 January 2020. He played six times as they suffered relegation, and scored a late equaliser in a 2–1 loss at Blackpool on 25 February.

On 28 November 2020, Bryan made his Premier League debut in a 1–0 away defeat against West Bromwich Albion. On 27 January 2021, he scored his first Premier League goal in a 2–1 away win over Manchester United.

=== West Bromwich Albion ===
On 7 September 2021, Bryan signed for West Bromwich Albion on a two-year deal following his release from Sheffield United in the summer. After sustaining a cruciate ligament injury in a 1-0 win against Hull City on 3 November 2021, Bryan was ruled out for the rest of the season. In May 2023, Bryan was released.

On 1 November 2023, Bryan announced his retirement from professional football citing advice from medical professionals regarding his on-going knee injury.

== Style of play ==
Able to operate as a centre-back or box-to-box midfield, Bryan has been praised for his vision and passing ability, as well as for his long-range shots and penalty-taking.

== Personal life ==
Bryan has been in a relationship with actress Brooke Vincent since 2016. They have two sons, born in October 2019 and May 2021. His mother died in June 2020.

In 2026, it was reported that Bryan and his fiancé of 10 years, Brooke Vincent, had split.

== Career statistics ==
Appearances and goals by club, season and competition
Club	Season	League			FA Cup		League Cup		Other		Total	
Club	Season	Division	Apps	Goals	Apps	Goals	Apps	Goals	Apps	Goals	Apps	Goals
Manchester City	2016–17	Premier League	0	0	0	0	0	0	0	0	0	0
Manchester City	2017–18	Premier League	0	0	0	0	0	0	0	0	0	0
Bury (loan)	2016–17	League One	12	0	0	0	1	0	0	0	13	0
Oldham Athletic (loan)	2017–18	League One	32	2	1	0	0	0	4 (Note: Appearance(s) in the EFL Trophy.)	0	37	2
Sheffield United	2018–19	Championship	0	0	1	0	0	0	—		1	0
Sheffield United	2019–20	Premier League	0	0	1	0	2	0	—		3	0
Sheffield United	2020–21	Premier League	13	1	2	0	0	0	—		15	1
Sheffield United	Total		13	1	4	0	2	0	—		19	1
Bolton Wanderers (loan)	2019–20	League One	6	1	0	0	0	0	0	0	6	1
West Bromwich Albion	2021–22	Championship	3	0	0	0	0	0	—		3	0
West Bromwich Albion	2022–23	Championship	0	0	0	0	0	0	—		0	0
West Bromwich Albion	Total		3	0	0	0	0	0	—		3	0
Career total			66	4	5	0	3	0	4	0	78	4

== Honours ==
- Oldham Athletic Young Player Of The Season 2017–18
