= Cameron Dummigan =

Northern Irish professional footballer

Personal information
- Full name: Cameron Dummigan
- Date of birth: 2 June 1996 (age 30)
- Place of birth: Lurgan, Northern Ireland
- Height: 1.80 m (5 ft 11 in)
- Positions: Defender; midfielder

Team information
- Current team: Derry City
- Number: 23

Youth career
- –2012: Cliftonville
- 2012–2013: Burnley

Senior career*
Years	Team	Apps	(Gls)
2013–2016	Burnley	0	(0)
2015–2016	→ Oldham Athletic (loan)	26	(1)
2016–2019	Oldham Athletic	48	(2)
2019–2021	Dundalk	51	(1)
2020	→ Crusaders (loan)	3	(0)
2022–	Derry City	96	(5)

International career
2012–2013	Northern Ireland U17	6	(0)
2013	Northern Ireland U19	3	(0)
2014–2018	Northern Ireland U21	18	(0)
- * Club domestic league appearances and goals as of 12:33, 9 November 2026 (UTC)

Cameron Dummigan (born 2 June 1996) is a Northern Irish professional footballer who plays as a defender for League of Ireland Premier Division side Derry City.

== Club career ==
Born in Lurgan, County Armagh, Dummigan attended St Paul's Junior High School in the town and played for junior side Sunnyside and local GAA side St Paul's, winning leagues and championships at all levels before signing for Cliftonville. In July 2012, he was recruited by Championship side Burnley, signing a two-year scholarship with the club. Dummigan impressed during his time in the youth team winning the Player of the Year Award in his first season with the club. In the 2013–14 season he was fast-tracked into the Development Squad and also featured on the bench as an unused substitute for first team matches against Watford and Southampton. In April 2014, he signed his first professional contract, signing a two-year deal until 2016.

Dummigan was promoted to the first team in the summer of 2014 after Burnley had won promotion to the Premier League, and was an unused substitute for the opening game against Chelsea, which ended in a 3–1 defeat. He did however spend the majority of the season playing with the Development Squad featuring in friendlies. He started the 2015–16 season as back-up right back to Tendayi Darikwa, following the injury to Matt Lowton in pre-season, featuring on the bench for the first two games of the season. In October 2015, he was sent out on loan to League One side Oldham Athletic on a one-month youth loan deal. He made his professional debut in the 3–3 draw away to Gillingham, playing the full ninety minutes.

At the end of the 2017–18 season, when Oldham were relegated to League Two, the club exercised an option to extend his contract.

On 7 December 2021, he signed a two-year contract with League of Ireland Premier Division side Derry City, after 3 years with Dundalk.

On 5 June 2024, Dummigan signed a new two-year deal with Derry City, to keep him at the club until the end of the 2026 season. On 8 November 2026, he was part of the starting XI in a 1–0 win over Waterford in the 2026 FAI Cup final at the Aviva Stadium.

== International career ==
Dummigan has been capped at under-17, under-19 and under-21 level for Northern Ireland.

== Career statistics ==
As of match played on 8 November 2026

Appearances and goals by club, season and competition
Club	Season	League			National Cup (Note: Includes FA Cup, FAI Cup & Irish Cup)		League Cup (Note: Includes EFL Cup, League of Ireland Cup & Northern Ireland Football League Cup)		Europe		Other		Total	
Club	Season	Division	Apps	Goals	Apps	Goals	Apps	Goals	Apps	Goals	Apps	Goals	Apps	Goals
Burnley	2013–14	EFL Championship	0	0	0	0	0	0	—		—		0	0
Burnley	2014–15	Premier League	0	0	0	0	0	0	—		—		0	0
Burnley	2015–16	EFL Championship	0	0	—		0	0	—		—		0	0
Burnley	Total		0	0	0	0	0	0	—		—		0	0
Oldham Athletic (loan)	2015–16	EFL League One	26	1	1	0	—		—		—		27	1
Oldham Athletic	2016–17	EFL League One	12	0	2	0	0	0	—		0	0	14	0
Oldham Athletic	2017–18	EFL League One	30	2	1	0	1	0	—		2 (Note: Appearances in EFL Trophy)	0	34	2
Oldham Athletic	2018–19	EFL League Two	6	0	2	0	0	0	—		2	0	10	0
Oldham Athletic	Total		74	3	6	0	1	0	—		4	0	85	3
Dundalk	2019	LOI Premier Division	14	1	2	0	2	0	1 (Note: Appearances in UEFA Europa League)	0	1 (Note: Appearances in Champions Cup)	0	19	1
Dundalk	2020	LOI Premier Division	8	0	3	0	—		5	0	—		16	0
Dundalk	2021	LOI Premier Division	29	0	5	0	—		2 (Note: Appearances in UEFA Europa Conference League)	0	1 (Note: Appearance in President's Cup)	0	37	0
Dundalk	Total		51	1	10	0	2	0	8	0	3	0	72	1
Crusaders (loan)	2019–20	NIFL Premiership	3	0	2	0	1	0	—		—		6	0
Derry City	2022	LOI Premier Division	33	2	5	0	—		2	0	—		40	2
Derry City	2023	LOI Premier Division	16	0	2	0	—		5	0	0	0	23	0
Derry City	2024	LOI Premier Division	15	1	2	0	—		2 (Note: Appearances in UEFA Conference League)	0	-		19	1
Derry City	2025	LOI Premier Division	7	0	0	0	—		-		-		7	0
Derry City	2026	LOI Premier Division	25	2	5	0	—		4 (Note: 2 appearances in UEFA Europa League; 2 appearances in UEFA Conference League)	0	0	0	34	2
Total			96	5	14	0	—		13	0	0	0	123	5
Career total			216	9	26	0	3	0	21	0	5	0	271	9

== Honours ==
Dundalk

- League of Ireland Premier Division: 2019
- FAI Cup: 2020
- League of Ireland Cup: 2019
- President's Cup: 2019

Derry City

- FAI Cup: 2022, 2026

=== Individual ===
- PFAI Team of the Year: 2022
