= Rob Hunt (footballer) =

English footballer (born 1995)

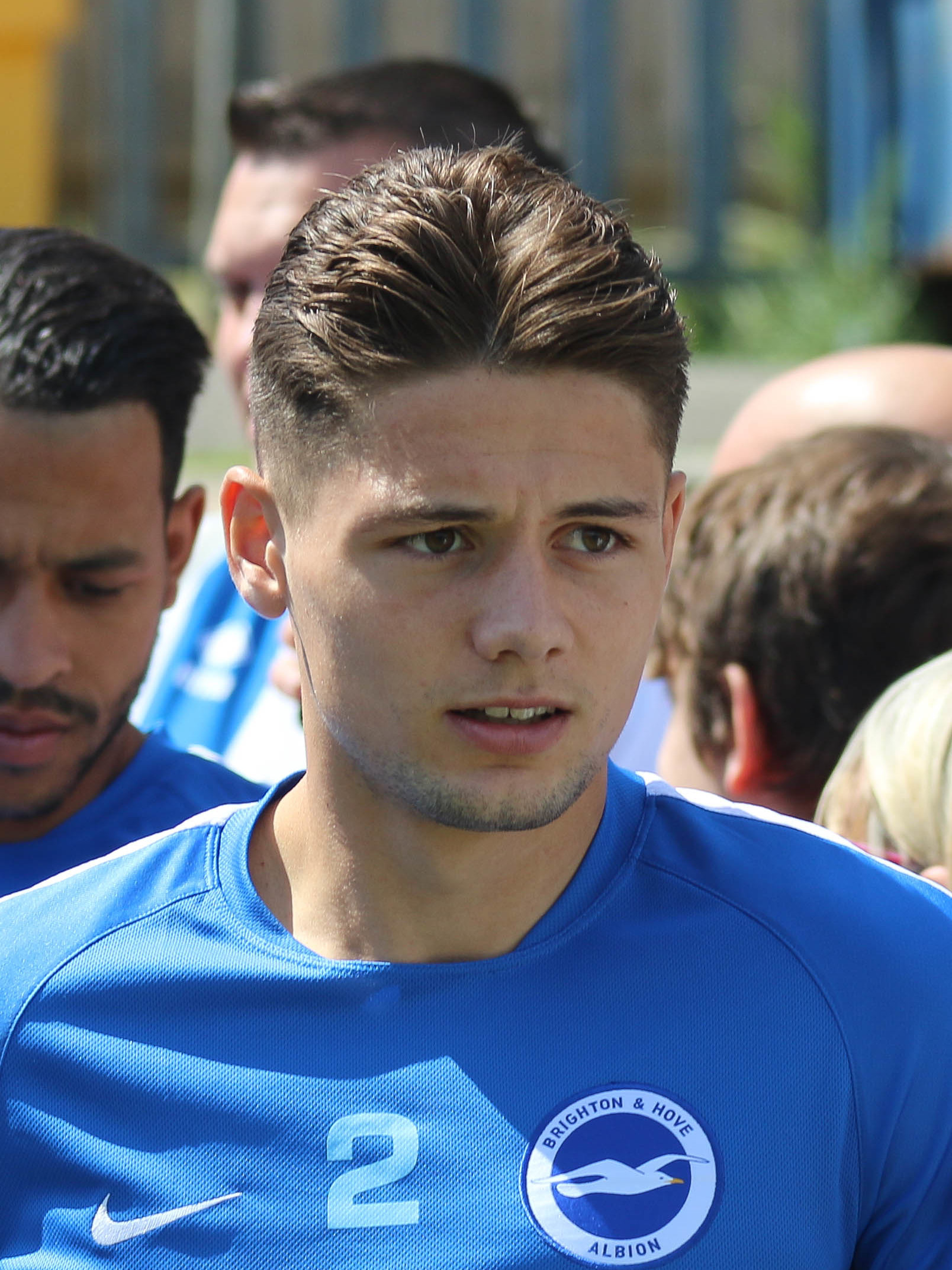
- Hunt in 2015

Personal information
- Full name: Robert Donald Hunt
- Date of birth: 7 July 1995 (age 31)
- Place of birth: Dagenham, England
- Height: 5 ft 7 in (1.71 m)
- Position: Right back

Team information
- Current team: Colchester United
- Number: 2

Youth career
- –2013: Brighton & Hove Albion

Senior career*
Years	Team	Apps	(Gls)
2013–2017	Brighton & Hove Albion	1	(0)
2017	→ Oldham Athletic (loan)	10	(0)
2017–2019	Oldham Athletic	71	(1)
2019–2022	Swindon Town	90	(1)
2022–2024	Leyton Orient	67	(1)
2024–	Colchester United	63	(1)
- * Club domestic league appearances and goals as of 23:38, 23 August 2026 (UTC)

Robert Donald Hunt (born 7 July 1995) is an English professional footballer who plays as a right back for Colchester United. He has played in the English Football League for Brighton & Hove Albion, Oldham Athletic and Leyton Orient.

== Career ==
=== Brighton & Hove Albion ===
Born in Dagenham, Greater London, Hunt joined Brighton & Hove Albion when he was twelve. After progressing through the club's youth system and the development squad, Hunt signed his first professional contract in May 2013. Two years later, he signed another contract for another season.

Hunt made his first-team debut for Brighton on 9 August 2016 in a 4–0 home victory over Colchester United in the EFL Cup, playing the full 90 minutes. Hunt made his league debut for Brighton on 17 September against Burton Albion, coming on for Bruno in the 73rd minute. After making his debut, Hunt was quoted as saying: "It was a great experience and I'm just delighted to have made my league debut after coming here when I was 15 or 16. It was a great experience and I thoroughly enjoyed it."

Following his good performance in the EFL Cup and the development squad in the first half of the 2017–18 season, Hunt signed a contract with the club, keeping him until 2018. Upon leaving the club, Hunt reflected on his time at Brighton & Hove Albion, quoting: "I can't thank them [Simon and Vic] enough and it feels like I've known them for longer than five or six years. Seeing them every day, learning off them and seeing how good their coaching is, has made me into a better player."

=== Oldham Athletic ===
After being told by the club that he was to be loaned out, Hunt joined League One club Oldham Athletic on 26 January 2017 on a loan deal lasting until the end of the 2016–17 season. He made his debut four days later, coming on as an 84th-minute substitute in a 2–1 home loss against Bradford City. In a follow-up match, he played the whole 90 minutes as Oldham won 1–0 away to Chesterfield. He started eight more matches before suffering hamstring injuries. Although he later recovered from a hamstring injury for the second time, Hunt, however, remained out of the first team for the rest of the season. After making ten appearances, Hunt returned to his parent club at the end of the season.

Hunt signed for Oldham Athletic permanently on 13 July 2017 on a three-year contract. Hunt's first appearance after signing for the club on a permanent basis came in the opening match of the 2017–18 season, in a 2–0 home loss against Oxford United. Although he found himself competing with Gevaro Nepomuceno, Hunt started in every match before suffering a hamstring injury. After recovering from a hamstring injury, Hunt returned to the first team on 26 September 2017, starting in the right-back position in a 3–2 home win over Peterborough United.

=== Swindon Town ===
Hunt signed for League Two club Swindon Town on 24 June 2019 on a two-year contract after his contract with Oldham was terminated by mutual consent. In July 2020, he extended his contract with the club until summer 2022.

=== Leyton Orient ===
After a spell on trial at Crawley Town, Hunt signed for Leyton Orient on a two-year contract, after rejecting the offer of a new contract with Swindon. He was part of the Orient team that were promoted to League One as champions of League Two in the 2022–23 season, but he was released in summer 2024.

=== Colchester United ===
On 1 July 2024, Hunt joined League Two side Colchester United on a two-year deal. He renewed his contract with the club on 10 July 2026.

== Career statistics ==
As of match played 26 October 2024

Appearances and goals by club, season and competition
Club	Season	League			FA Cup		EFL Cup		Other		Total	
Club	Season	Division	Apps	Goals	Apps	Goals	Apps	Goals	Apps	Goals	Apps	Goals
Brighton & Hove Albion	2016–17	Championship	1	0	1	0	3	0	—		5	0
Brighton & Hove Albion U23	2016–17 EFL Trophy		—		—		—		3 (Note: Appearances in EFL Trophy)	0	3	0
Oldham Athletic (loan)	2016–17	League One	10	0	—		—		—		10	0
Oldham Athletic	2017–18	League One	33	0	1	0	1	0	2	0	37	0
Oldham Athletic	2018–19	League Two	38	1	2	1	1	0	2	0	43	2
Oldham Athletic	Total		82	1	4	1	5	0	7	0	98	2
Swindon Town	2019–20	League Two	34	1	2	0	1	0	3	0	40	1
Swindon Town	2020–21	League One	19	0	1	0	1	0	2	0	23	0
Swindon Town	2021-22	League Two	37	0	3	0	1	0	3	0	44	0
Swindon Town	Total		90	1	6	0	3	0	8	0	107	1
Leyton Orient	2022–23	League Two	32	0	1	0	0	0	0	0	33	0
Leyton Orient	2023–24	League One	35	1	1	0	1	0	2	0	39	1
Leyton Orient	Total		67	1	2	0	1	0	2	0	72	1
Colchester United	2024–25	League Two	12	0	0	0	2	0	2	0	16	0
Colchester United	Total		12	0	0	0	2	0	2	0	16	0
Career total			251	3	12	1	11	0	19	0	293	4

== Honours ==
Swindon Town

- EFL League Two: 2019–20

Leyton Orient

- EFL League Two: 2022–23
