= Jamie Stott =

English footballer (born 1997)

Personal information
- Full name: Jamie Garry Stott
- Date of birth: 22 December 1997 (age 28)
- Place of birth: Bury, England
- Height: 1.85 m (6 ft 1 in)
- Position: Centre-back

Team information
- Current team: Derry City
- Number: 4

Youth career
- –2016: Oldham Athletic

Senior career*
Years	Team	Apps	(Gls)
2016–2020	Oldham Athletic	4	(0)
2016–2017	→ Curzon Ashton (loan)	26	(2)
2017	→ AFC Fylde (loan)	0	(0)
2017–2018	→ Curzon Ashton (loan)	5	(0)
2018	→ Stockport County (loan)	16	(0)
2018–2019	→ Stockport County (loan)	16	(2)
2020–2022	Stockport County	11	(0)
2021–2022	→ Fylde (loan)	32	(1)
2022–2024	Halifax Town	76	(3)
2024–2025	Morecambe	45	(3)
2025–	Derry City	36	(0)
- * Club domestic league appearances and goals as of 12:28, 9 November 2026 (UTC)

Jamie Garry Stott (born 22 December 1997) is an English footballer who plays for League of Ireland Premier Division club Derry City.

== Club career ==
Jamie is an academy graduate, having been at Oldham Athletic since the age of nine. He has had numerous loans spells at non-league clubs in the North-West of England, including two spells at Stockport County, where he has won young player of the season awards. In the 2019/20 season Jamie was looking to secure a first team spot in the Stockport squad after winning the league with them in 2019.

In August 2021, Stott returned to National League North side AFC Fylde on loan for the season.

Stott was released by Stockport following promotion to the Football League in the 2021–22 season, signing for FC Halifax Town in June 2022.

Stott was one of 15 free agents that signed for League Two club Morecambe on 12 July 2024, after the club's embargo on registering new players was lifted.

On 29 July 2025, Stott joined League of Ireland Premier Division club Derry City on an 18 month contract. On 8 November 2026, he was part of the starting XI in a 1–0 win over Waterford in the 2026 FAI Cup final at the Aviva Stadium.

== Career statistics ==
As of match played on 8 November 2026

Appearances and goals by club, season and competition
Club	Season	League			National Cup (Note: Includes FA Cup & FAI Cup)		League Cup (Note: Includes EFL Cup)		Other		Total	
Club	Season	Division	Apps	Goals	Apps	Goals	Apps	Goals	Apps	Goals	Apps	Goals
Oldham Athletic	2016–17	League One	4	0	—		0	0	0	0	4	0
Oldham Athletic	2017–18	League One	0	0	—		0	0	0	0	0	0
Oldham Athletic	Total		4	0	0	0	0	0	0	0	4	0
Curzon Ashton (loan)	2016–17	National League North	26	2	4	0	—		0	0	30	2
AFC Fylde (loan)	2017–18	National League	0	0	1	0	—		0	0	1	0
Curzon Ashton (loan)	2017–18	National League North	5	0	—		—		0	0	5	0
Stockport County (loan)	2017–18	National League North	16	0	0	0	—		0	0	16	0
Stockport County (loan)	2018–19	National League	16	2	3	0	—		5 (Note: Appearance(s) in FA Trophy)	0	24	2
Stockport County	2020–21	National League	11	0	2	0	—		2	0	15	0
Stockport County	2021–22	National League	0	0	0	0	—		0	0	0	0
Stockport County	Total		43	2	5	0	0	0	7	0	55	2
AFC Fylde (loan)	2021–22	National League North	32	1	2	0	—		2	0	36	1
Halifax Town	2022–23	National League	30	2	1	0	—		2	0	33	2
Halifax Town	2023–24	National League	46	1	0	0	—		1 (Note: appearance in National League play-offs)	0	47	1
Halifax Town	Total		76	3	1	0	0	0	3	0	80	3
Morecambe	2024–25	League Two	45	3	3	0	1	0	2 (Note: appearances in EFL Trophy)	0	51	3
Derry City	2025	LOI Premier Division	10	0	1	0	—		—		11	0
Derry City	2026	LOI Premier Division	26	0	5	0	—		4 (Note: 2 appearances in UEFA Europa League; 2 appearances in UEFA Conference League)	0	35	0
Derry City	Total		36	0	6	0	–		4	0	46	0
Career total			265	11	20	0	1	0	18	0	308	11

== Honours ==
FC Halifax Town

- FA Trophy: 2022–23

Derry City

- FAI Cup: 2026
