= Josh Law =

English footballer (born 1989)

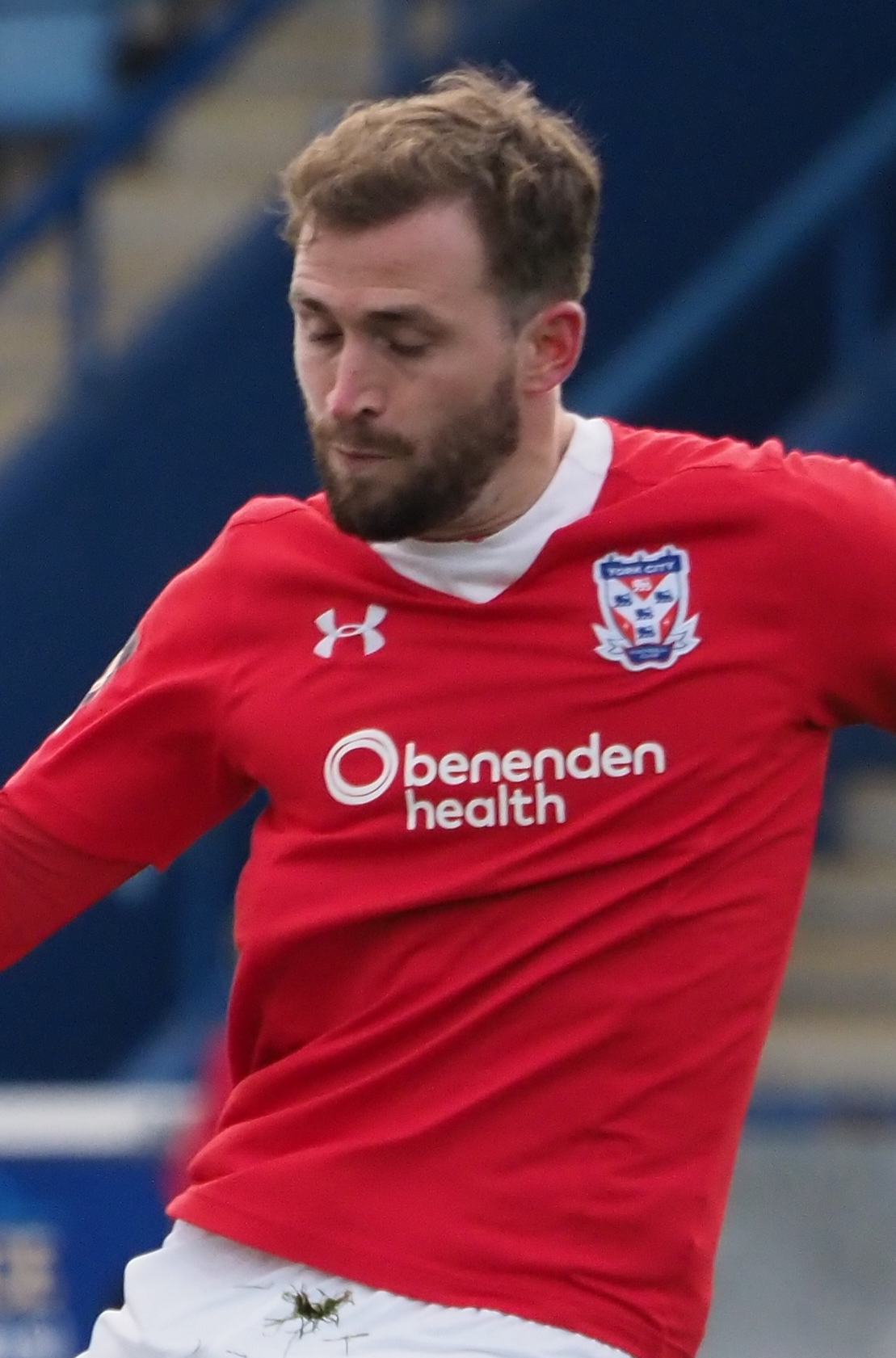
- Law playing for York City in 2018

Personal information
- Full name: Joshua Neil Law
- Date of birth: 19 August 1989 (age 37)
- Place of birth: Nottingham, England
- Height: 5 ft 11 in (1.80 m)
- Positions: Defender; midfielder

Team information
- Current team: Basford United

Youth career
- 2005–2007: Chesterfield

Senior career*
| Years | Team | Apps | (Gls) |
| 2007–2008 | Chesterfield | 0 | (0) |
| 2007–2008 | → Alfreton Town (loan) | 30 | (5) |
| 2008–2014 | Alfreton Town | 234 | (18) |
| 2014–2016 | Motherwell | 63 | (0) |
| 2016–2017 | Oldham Athletic | 22 | (2) |
| 2017–2019 | York City | 59 | (1) |
| 2019– | Basford United | 5 | (0) |
- * Club domestic league appearances and goals as of 23:34, 14 January 2020 (UTC)

Joshua Neil Law (born 19 August 1989) is an English professional footballer who plays as a defender or midfielder for Northern Premier League Division One Midlands club Basford United. He has played in the Scottish Premiership for Motherwell and in the English Football League for Oldham Athletic.

== Early and personal life ==
Born in Nottingham, Nottinghamshire, Law is the son of the former Chesterfield manager Nicky Law and brother of fellow professional footballer, also called Nicky. In June 2015, Law got married in New York, United States, with his brother Nicky as his best man.

== Career ==
=== Chesterfield ===
Law started his apprenticeship with Chesterfield in 2005, before signing his first professional contract in July 2007. He made his first-team debut against Hartlepool United in the Football League Trophy in September 2007, seeing a shot cleared off the line and another hitting the bar.

=== Alfreton Town ===
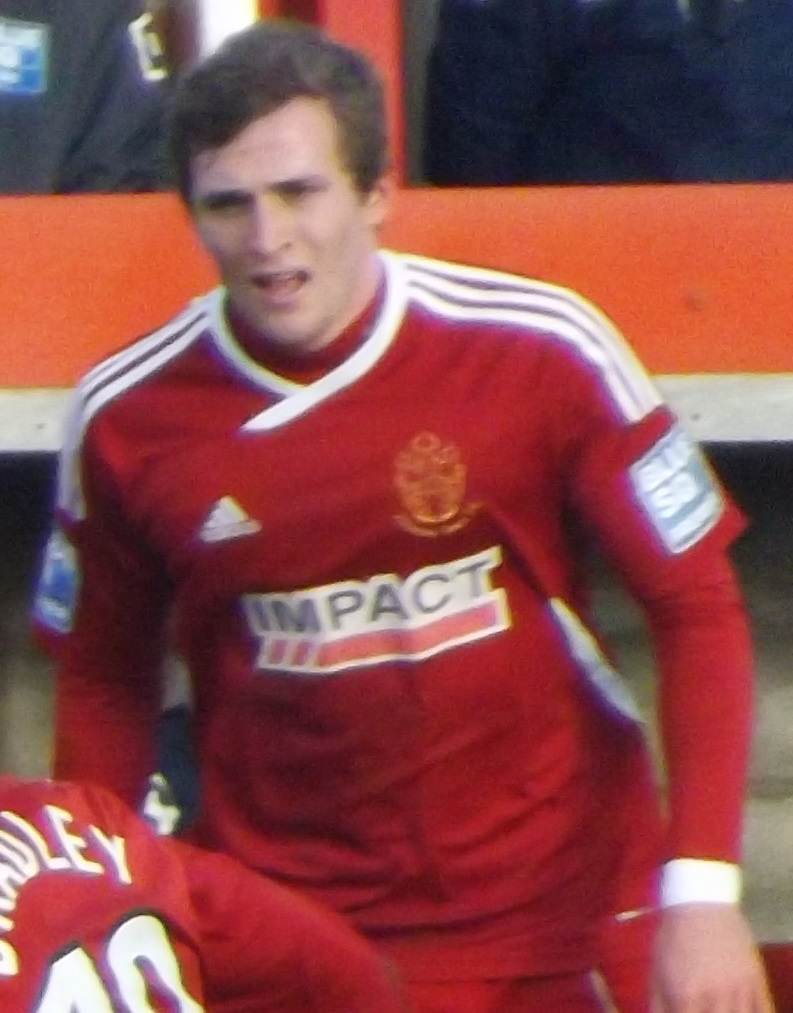
Law playing for Alfreton Town in 2013

He joined Conference North club Alfreton Town, managed by his father, on a three-month loan in October 2007. At the end of the loan, the deal was extended until the end of the 2007–08 season.

After being released by Chesterfield upon the expiry of his contract, Law made a permanent move to Alfreton in the 2008 close season. After his first full season at the club, Law signed a one-year contract and then the following summer signed another one-year contract. During his time at the club, Law played in both full back and midfielder position.

At the end of 2010–11, Law was given the Players' Player of the Season Award. He was also named in the 2010–11 Conference North Team of the Season. At the end of 2011–12, Law signed another one-year contract with the club. In May 2013, Law signed another one-year contract with the club.

Law spent seven seasons at Alfreton and made over 250 appearances, where he was one of the longest serving players at the club at the time.

=== Motherwell ===
On 21 May 2014, Law completed a free transfer to Scottish Premiership club Motherwell, the same club his brother Nicky had played for previously, on a one-year contract. Law said he hoped the move to Motherwell would help him "establish myself in my own right and make a name for myself". Law made his first competitive appearance for Motherwell on 17 July 2014, in the UEFA Europa League second qualifying round first leg match against Stjarnan, in which he scored both Motherwell goals in a 2–2 draw at Fir Park. Law also played in the second leg, but Motherwell lost 3–2, being eliminated 5–4 on aggregate. Half-way through the season, Law changed role, moving into defence as a right-back, starting against Dundee on 10 January 2015. Law's performance soon earned him the club's Player of the Month award for February. In 2014–15, Law made 40 appearances, scoring twice.

On 27 May 2015, Law signed a new two-year contract with Motherwell. Law played in both legs as a right-back against his brother, as Motherwell beat Rangers 6–1 on aggregate to stay in the Scottish Premiership.

=== Oldham Athletic ===
On 9 July 2016, having asked to leave Motherwell for family reasons, Law signed for League One club Oldham Athletic on a one-year contract. He scored his first goal for Oldham in a 2–1 EFL Cup win against Wigan Athletic on 9 August 2016. He was released at the end of 2016–17.

=== Later career ===
Law signed for newly relegated National League North club York City on 3 July 2017 on a one-year contract. He was released at the end of the 2018–19 season.

Law signed for Northern Premier League Premier Division club Basford United on 11 May 2019 as a player and youth coach.

== Style of play ==
Law primarily plays at right back but can also play in midfield.

== Career statistics ==
As of match played 14 January 2020

Appearances and goals by club, season and competition
| Club | Season | League | | | National Cup (Note: Includes FA Cup, Scottish Cup) | | League Cup (Note: Includes Scottish League Cup, EFL Cup) | | Other | | Total | |
| Club | Season | Division | Apps | Goals | Apps | Goals | Apps | Goals | Apps | Goals | Apps | Goals |
|---|---|---|---|---|---|---|---|---|---|---|---|---|
| Chesterfield | 2007–08 | League Two | 0 | 0 | — | | 0 | 0 | 1 (Note: Appearance in Football League Trophy) | 0 | 1 | 0 |
| Alfreton Town (loan) | 2007–08 | Conference North | 30 | 5 | — | | — | | 6 (Note: Two appearances in Conference League Cup, four in FA Trophy) | 0 | 36 | 5 |
| Alfreton Town | 2008–09 | Conference North | 39 | 3 | 6 | 2 | — | | 5 (Note: One appearance in Conference League Cup, two appearances and one goal in FA Trophy, two appearances in Conference North play-offs) | 1 | 50 | 6 |
| Alfreton Town | 2009–10 | Conference North | 39 | 2 | 3 | 0 | — | | 5 (Note: Two appearances in FA Trophy, three in Conference North play-offs) | 0 | 47 | 2 |
| Alfreton Town | 2010–11 | Conference North | 35 | 5 | 2 | 0 | — | | 3 (Note: Appearance(s) in FA Trophy) | 1 | 40 | 6 |
| Alfreton Town | 2011–12 | Conference Premier | 38 | 1 | 2 | 0 | — | | 3 | 0 | 43 | 1 |
| Alfreton Town | 2012–13 | Conference Premier | 44 | 2 | 3 | 0 | — | | 1 | 0 | 48 | 2 |
| Alfreton Town | 2013–14 | Conference Premier | 39 | 5 | 2 | 0 | — | | 1 | 0 | 42 | 5 |
| Alfreton Town | Total | | 264 | 23 | 18 | 2 | — | | 24 | 2 | 306 | 27 |
| Motherwell | 2014–15 | Scottish Premiership | 34 | 0 | 1 | 0 | 1 | 0 | 4 (Note: Two appearances and two goals in UEFA Europa League, two appearances in Scottish Premiership play-offs) | 2 | 40 | 2 |
| Motherwell | 2015–16 | Scottish Premiership | 29 | 0 | 2 | 0 | 2 | 0 | — | | 33 | 0 |
| Motherwell | Total | | 63 | 0 | 3 | 0 | 3 | 0 | 4 | 2 | 73 | 2 |
| Oldham Athletic | 2016–17 | League One | 22 | 2 | 1 | 0 | 2 | 1 | 3 (Note: Appearances in EFL Trophy) | 0 | 28 | 3 |
| York City | 2017–18 | National League North | 34 | 1 | 1 | 0 | — | | 2 | 0 | 37 | 1 |
| York City | 2018–19 | National League North | 25 | 0 | 4 | 0 | — | | 2 | 0 | 31 | 0 |
| York City | Total | | 59 | 1 | 5 | 0 | — | | 4 | 0 | 68 | 1 |
| Basford United | 2019–20 | Northern Premier League; Premier Division | 5 | 0 | 1 | 0 | — | | 3 (Note: One appearance and one goal in FA Trophy, two appearances in Northern Premier League Challenge Cup) | 1 | 9 | 1 |
| Career total | | | 413 | 26 | 28 | 2 | 5 | 1 | 39 | 5 | 485 | 34 |

== Honours ==
Alfreton Town

- Conference North: 2010–11

Individual

- Conference North Team of the Year: 2010–11
