= Jamie Reckord =

English footballer

Personal information
- Full name: Jamie Vincent Junior Reckord
- Date of birth: 9 March 1992 (age 34)
- Place of birth: Wolverhampton, England
- Height: 5 ft 10 in (1.78 m)
- Position: Left back

Youth career
- 2001–2010: Wolverhampton Wanderers

Senior career*
Years	Team	Apps	(Gls)
2010–2014	Wolverhampton Wanderers	0	(0)
2011	→ Northampton Town (loan)	7	(0)
2012	→ Scunthorpe United (loan)	17	(0)
2012	→ Coventry City (loan)	9	(0)
2013	→ Plymouth Argyle (loan)	12	(0)
2014	→ Swindon Town (loan)	5	(0)
2014–2016	Ross County	42	(1)
2016–2017	Oldham Athletic	13	(0)
2017–2020	Solihull Moors	91	(3)
2020–2022	Wrexham	45	(3)
2022	Boreham Wood	6	(0)
2022–2023	Yeovil Town	34	(4)
2023–2024	Gloucester City	35	(0)

International career
2008	England U16	2	(0)
2008–2009	England U17	9	(0)
- * Club domestic league appearances and goals as of 22:09, 23 June 2023 (UTC)

Jamie Vincent Junior Reckord (born 9 March 1992) is an English footballer who plays as a full back. He started his career at Wolverhampton Wanderers and during his time there had spells on loan with Northampton Town, Scunthorpe United, Coventry City, Plymouth Argyle and Swindon Town.

== Career ==
=== Wolverhampton Wanderers ===
Reckord joined Wolverhampton Wanderers academy in December 2001 before being given a scholarship. Then in 2010, Reckord signed his first professional contract at the club.

In May 2011, Reckord signed a 12-month contract extension, keeping him at the club until 2012. He made his Wolves debut in a League Cup match on 23 August 2011, in a 4–0 win over his former loan club, Northampton. This was to be his only appearance for the club until another League Cup tie two years later on 6 August 2013, in a 1–0 loss against Morecambe.

After an impressive loan spell at Scunthorpe United, Reckord had his contract with Wolves extended for another 12 months in May 2011. At the end of the 2013–14 season, it was announced that his contract with Wolves would not be extended.

=== Loan spells ===
In March 2011, Reckord gained his first senior football experience when he moved on loan for the rest of the season to League Two side Northampton Town, where he made his professional debut a day before his 19th birthday in a 2–1 defeat at Chesterfield. Reckford went on to make eleven appearances for Northampton Town.

On 30 January 2012, Reckord joined League One side Scunthorpe United on a month's loan, later extended for a further month. Reckford made his Scunthorpe United debut on 14 February 2012, in a 1–0 win over Rochdale. His four appearances at Scunthorpe led to the club extending the move until 31 March 2012. Then on 5 April 2012, the loan was extended until the end of the season. The next day, Reckord then provided an assist for Jon Parkin, in a 1–0 win over Exeter City. Reckord went on to make seventeen appearances for the club before a shoulder injury kept him out for the rest of the season.

Reckord went out on loan again in September 2012, when he joined League One side Coventry City on an agreed 93-day emergency loan. He made his Coventry City debut the next day, coming on as a substitute for Billy Daniels in the 64th minutes, in a 2–1 loss against Carlisle United. However, after nine appearances for Coventry, he was ultimately recalled early by his parent club after failing to get regular playing time.

In September 2013, Reckord was loaned to League Two side Plymouth Argyle for three months, during which he made 16 appearances before returning to his parent club.

On 25 January 2014, Reckord again moved on loan, this time to League One Swindon Town in a three-month deal. He made his debut the same day, coming on as a substitute for Jay McEveley after he was injured, in a 3–1 loss against Shrewsbury Town. Reckord made only three appearances for the Robins during this loan, as his first team opportunities soon became limited before returning to Wolves.

=== Ross County ===
On 16 October 2014, Reckord signed for Scottish Premiership side Ross County. On 8 November 2014, he made his Ross County debut, in a 3–0 win over Kilmarnock. Reckord provided two assists in two separate matches against Dundee United and Motherwell.

After making an impression in the left-back position, Reckord signed an 18-month contract with the club. He then scored his first goal, in a 1–0 win over Dundee on 28 February 2015.

On 14 April 2016, Reckord was released by Scottish Premiership side Ross County.

=== Oldham Athletic ===
On 11 July 2016, Reckord signed a one-year deal with League One side Oldham Athletic. He was released at the end of the season and joined Solihull Moors on a short-term deal in December 2017.

=== Wrexham ===
On 14 August 2020, Reckord signed for National League club Wrexham on a one-year deal.

=== Boreham Wood ===
On 21 January 2022, Reckord moved to fellow National League club Boreham Wood on an eighteen-month contract following the mutual termination of his Wrexham contract.

=== Yeovil Town ===
On 1 July 2022, Reckord signed for fellow National League club Yeovil Town on a one-year deal with an option of an additional year. On 23 June 2023, Reckord departed Yeovil Town following mutual termination of his contract.

=== Gloucester City ===
On 24 June 2023, Reckord signed for National League North club Gloucester City. Reckord left the club in December 2024.

== International career ==
During his development, Reckord represented England both at England U16 and England U17 level.

== Career statistics ==
As of match played 22 April 2023

Appearances and goals by club, season and competition
Club	Season	League			National Cup (Note: Includes FA Cup and Scottish Cup)		League Cup (Note: Includes EFL Cup and Scottish League Cup)		Other		Total	
Club	Season	Division	Apps	Goals	Apps	Goals	Apps	Goals	Apps	Goals	Apps	Goals
Wolverhampton Wanderers	2010–11	Premier League	0	0	0	0	0	0	—		0	0
Wolverhampton Wanderers	2011–12	Premier League	0	0	0	0	1	0	—		1	0
Wolverhampton Wanderers	2012–13	Championship	0	0	0	0	0	0	—		0	0
Wolverhampton Wanderers	2013–14	League One	0	0	0	0	1	0	0	0	1	0
Wolverhampton Wanderers	Total		0	0	0	0	2	0	0	0	2	0
Northampton Town (loan)	2010–11	League Two	7	0	—		—		—		7	0
Scunthorpe United (loan)	2011–12	League One	17	0	—		—		—		17	0
Coventry City (loan)	2012–13	League One	9	0	1	0	1	0	1 (Note: Appearance(s) in Football League Trophy)	0	12	0
Plymouth Argyle (loan)	2013–14	League Two	12	0	2	0	—		2	0	16	0
Swindon Town (loan)	2013–14	League One	5	0	—		—		—		5	0
Ross County	2014–15	Scottish Premiership	26	1	1	0	0	0	—		27	1
Ross County	2015–16	Scottish Premiership	16	0	2	0	3	0	—		21	0
Ross County	Total		42	1	3	0	3	0	—		48	1
Oldham Athletic	2016–17	League One	13	0	1	0	0	0	2 (Note: Appearances in EFL Trophy)	0	16	0
Solihull Moors	2017–18	National League	18	1	0	0	—		2 (Note: Appearance(s) in FA Trophy)	0	20	1
Solihull Moors	2018–19	National League	41	0	4	0	—		4 (Note: Three appearances in FA Trophy, one appearance in National League play-offs)	0	49	0
Solihull Moors	2019–20	National League	32	2	3	0	—		3 (Note: Two appearances in Scottish Challenge Cup, one appearance in FA Trophy)	0	38	2
Solihull Moors	Total		91	3	7	0	—		9	0	107	3
Wrexham	2020–21	National League	33	2	1	0	—		0	0	34	2
Wrexham	2021–22	National League	12	1	2	0	—		0	0	14	1
Wrexham	Total		45	3	3	0	—		0	0	48	3
Boreham Wood	2021–22	National League	6	0	—		—		1	0	7	0
Yeovil Town	2022–23	National League	34	4	1	0	—		2 (Note: One appearance in FA Trophy, one appearance in Somerset Premier Cup)	0	37	4
Career total			281	11	18	0	6	0	17	0	322	11
