= Eoin Doyle =

Irish footballer (born 1988)

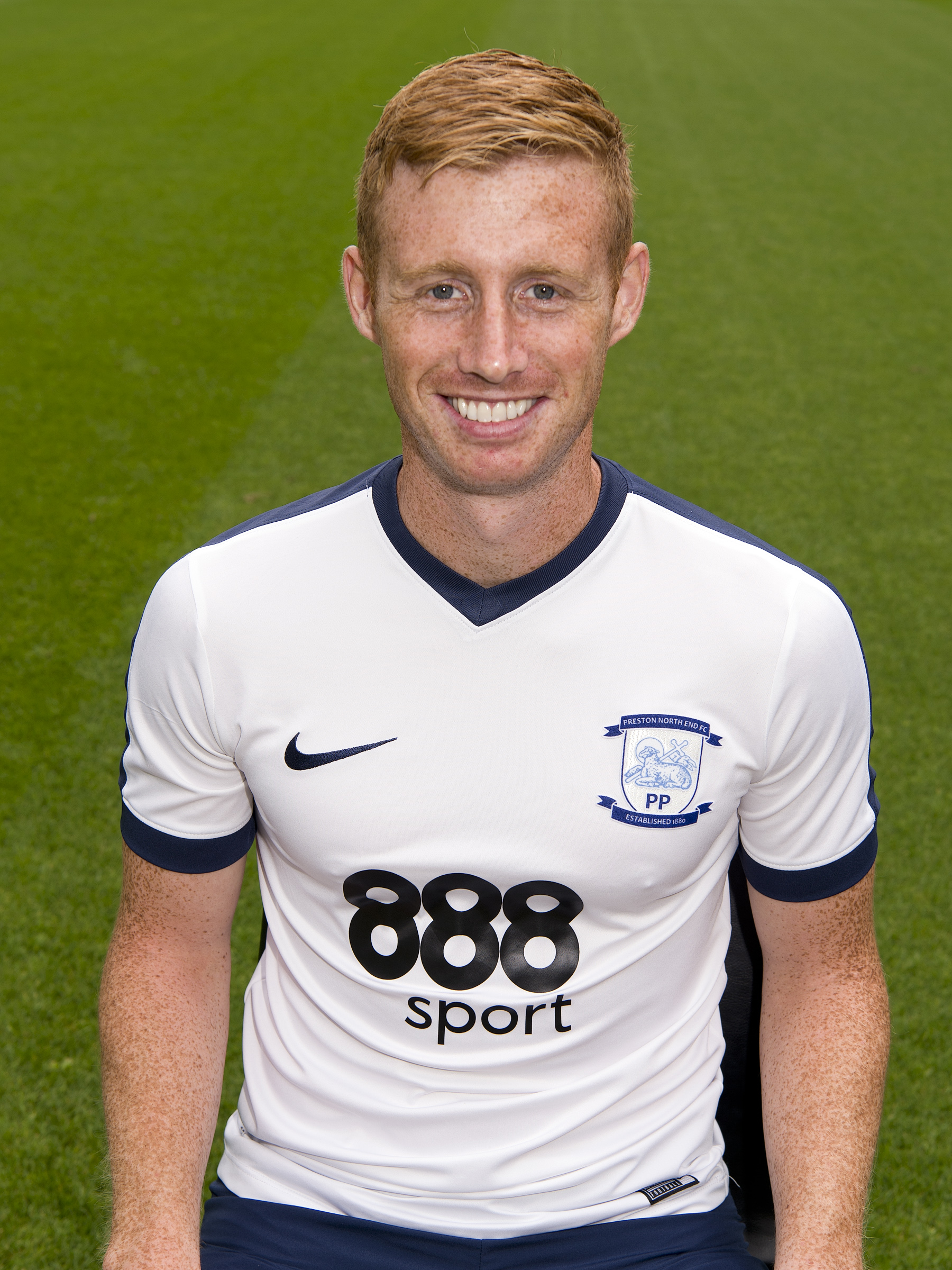
- Doyle with Preston North End in 2016

Personal information
- Full name: Eoin Doyle
- Date of birth: 12 March 1988 (age 38)
- Place of birth: Dublin, Ireland
- Height: 1.83 m (6 ft 0 in)
- Position: Forward

Youth career
- 1998–2001: Shelbourne
- 2001–2002: Cherry Orchard
- 2002–2006: Crumlin United

Senior career*
Years	Team	Apps	(Gls)
2007	Shelbourne	0	(0)
2007–2009	Shamrock Rovers	42	(5)
2009–2011	Sligo Rovers	84	(29)
2012–2013	Hibernian	49	(11)
2013–2015	Chesterfield	69	(32)
2015–2016	Cardiff City	16	(5)
2015–2016	→ Preston North End (loan)	28	(4)
2016–2018	Preston North End	11	(1)
2017	→ Portsmouth (loan)	12	(2)
2017–2018	→ Oldham Athletic (loan)	30	(14)
2018–2020	Bradford City	50	(11)
2019–2020	→ Swindon Town (loan)	22	(23)
2020	Swindon Town	6	(2)
2020–2022	Bolton Wanderers	64	(24)
2022–2023	St Patrick's Athletic	57	(18)
Total		540	(181)
- * Club domestic league appearances and goals

Eoin Doyle (born 12 March 1988) is an Irish former professional footballer who played as a forward.

During his career he played for Shelbourne, Shamrock Rovers, Sligo Rovers, Hibernian, Chesterfield, Cardiff City, Preston North End, Portsmouth, Oldham Athletic, Bradford City, Swindon Town, Bolton Wanderers, and St Patrick's Athletic.

== Playing career ==
=== Youth ===
Doyle was born in Dublin and had a very successful underage career which included playing for the U15 Republic of Ireland national football team. He first began his sporting career in Gaelic Football from an early age in Dublin. He then began his underage club career at then Irish champions Shelbourne, however after three years he left for Cherry Orchard in 2001. He was widely tipped to make the move to English football within a few years as his coaches believed him to be of such a standard.

=== Shelbourne ===
Following a four-year spell with Dublin club Crumlin United, Doyle returned to Shelbourne who had just been relegated to the League of Ireland First Division. He was one of new boss Dermot Keely's first signings and was expected to make a large impact at the club. His time there was cut short and he was released midway through the 2007 season without making his league debut following a disappointing spell for him and the club.

=== Shamrock Rovers ===
Later on in the 2007 season he signed for Shamrock Rovers. He was promoted from the U21s to the senior squad during the 2007 season, making his debut against Waterford United on 10 August 2007. In his first full season, 2008 League of Ireland, he netted five goals in 30 league appearances, with his first league goal coming against Sligo Rovers. It was speculated that he would move to a different club following manager Pat Scully's departure, however he remained at the club for the 2009 season. He was a substitute for Stephen Bradley in the first game at Tallaght Stadium. Unfortunately for Doyle he did not become a major player under new Rovers manager, Michael O'Neill after the signing of Gary Twigg.

=== Sligo Rovers ===
Doyle joined Sligo Rovers on 16 July 2009. He scored on his debut in a 2–0 win over St. Patrick's Athletic. He also scored in the 2009 FAI Cup Final at Tallaght Stadium, however Rovers lost the match 2–1 to Sporting Fingal.

Doyle contributed 8 goals during the successful 2010 season that saw Rovers win both domestic cups, the FAI Cup and the EA Sports Cup. Doyle did very well when forced to play as a centre-forward in the FAI Cup final win and scored one of two penalties in the shoot-out. The 2011 season proved to be his best to date. Early on in the season he was moved into the centre-forward position. He relished the role, scoring a hat-trick in a 3–1 win over Bray Wanderers and at one stage was the league's leading scorer. Doyle ended up scoring 25 goals as Rovers finished second in the league and won the 2011 FAI Cup Final. Doyle scored in the Cup Final penalty shootout, where Rovers ran out victorious 4–1 against Shelbourne. His contract with Rovers expired at the end of the season.

=== Hibernian ===
In December 2011, Doyle played in a closed-doors friendly match for Hibernian. Doyle signed an 18-month contract with Hibernian later that week. He made his first team debut in a 3–1 defeat against Edinburgh derby rivals Hearts. Doyle scored his first goal for Hibs on 7 January, in a Scottish Cup victory at Cowdenbeath. He scored the only goal of the game in the next round of the Scottish Cup, against Kilmarnock on 4 February. Doyle did not start a game for more than two months, until an appearance against St Mirren in late April, where he missed some chances as Hibs lost 1–0. A week later, however, Doyle scored his first league goal for Hibs during a 4–0 victory against Dunfermline, which secured Hibs' place in the SPL.

BBC Radio Sheffield reported on 3 April 2013 that Doyle had agreed to sign for English Football League Two club Chesterfield. Shortly after this announcement, Doyle scored the equaliser in the Scottish Cup semi-final, in which Hibernian overcame Falkirk 4–3 after extra time after having initially been behind 3–0. Doyle played his last match for Hibs in the 2013 Scottish Cup Final defeat by Celtic.

=== Chesterfield ===
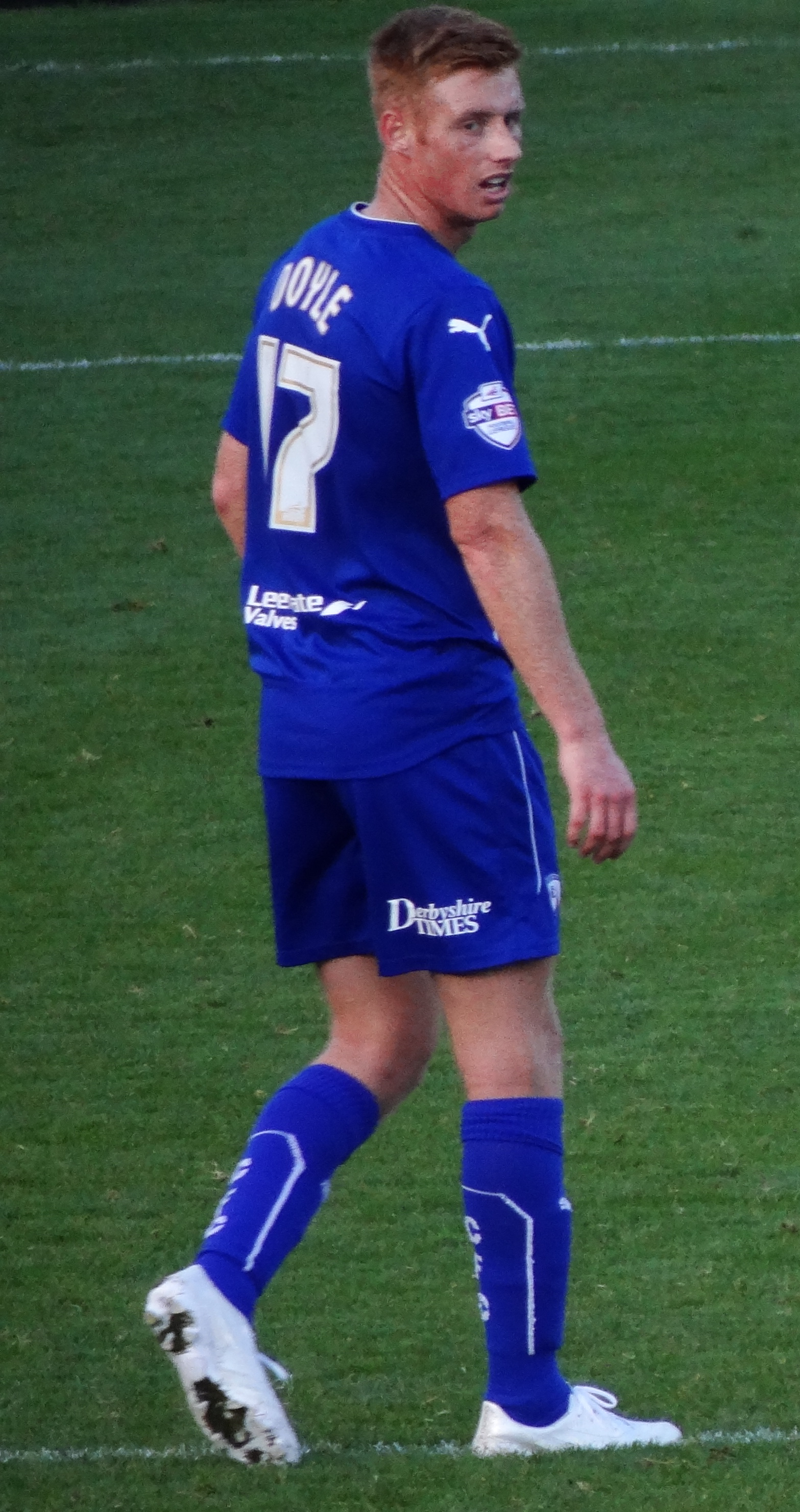
Doyle playing for Chesterfield in 2014

Following his agreement to sign for Chesterfield in April 2013, Doyle formally signed for the club on 31 May. Doyle said that the presence of manager Paul Cook, who had worked with him at Sligo Rovers, was an important factor in his decision to join Chesterfield.

==== 2013–14 season ====
Doyle scored 13 goals in all competitions in his first season with the club, in a season that saw the club promoted to League One and reach the Football League Trophy Final.

==== 2014–15 season ====
Doyle started the season brilliantly scoring seven goals in six games including a hat-trick against Scunthorpe. Three days later Doyle scored another hat-trick this time against Preston. Doyle was named Sky Bet League One Player of the Month for September after seven goals in four games. Doyle continued his form in October scoring three goals in two games against Sheffield United and Bristol City.

=== Cardiff City ===
On 2 February 2015, Doyle signed for Championship side Cardiff City for an undisclosed fee. He made his début in a 1–1 draw at Hillsborough against Sheffield Wednesday, and later scored his first goal on 21 March against Birmingham City. Doyle went on to score 5 goals in 16 appearances during the remainder of the season.

=== Preston North End ===
Despite being a regular in the Cardiff side the previous season, Doyle was sent on loan to Preston North End for the 2015–16 season on 1 September 2015, and made his debut as a substitute against Derby County on 12 September. It took Doyle a month to find the back the net, where he scored the winner against Nottingham Forest.

Doyle signed permanently for Preston for an undisclosed fee on 29 June 2016.

After a very public fight on the pitch between Doyle and Preston teammate Jermaine Beckford during the 2016/2017 season, Doyle fell out of favour and was subsequently loaned out to League Two side Portsmouth until the end of the season.

During the summer of 2017 after returning from an unsuccessful loan spell at Portsmouth, Doyle featured in new Preston North End manager Alex Neil's plans for the 2017–18 season, battling it out with Jordan Hugill and Sean Maguire to lead the line.

==== Oldham Athletic (loan) ====
On 31 August 2017, Oldham Athletic signed Doyle on loan until 1 January 2018.

=== Bradford City ===
He signed for Bradford City in August 2018.

He scored 10 goals in 44 games in his debut season with The Bantams

==== Swindon Town (loan) ====
On 16 August 2019, Doyle joined fellow League Two side Swindon Town on a year-long loan deal. In December 2019, he became the first player in any of England's top four leagues to score in eleven consecutive matches since Leicester City's Jamie Vardy in 2015. He was recalled by Bradford on 8 January 2020. He signed permanent deal with Swindon on 30 January 2020.

=== Swindon Town ===
Eoin Doyle signed a permanent deal with Swindon on 30 January 2020, following a successful loan with the club during the first half of 2019–20 season.

=== Bolton Wanderers ===
On 10 July 2020, Doyle joined newly relegated League Two club Bolton Wanderers on a three-year deal, turning down offers from League One sides Swindon Town and Sunderland to sign for The Trotters. After scoring three goals in Pre-season, his competitive debut came on 5 September in Bolton's first match of the season, a 1–2 home defeat against Bradford in the first round of the EFL Cup. He scored his first competitive goal on 3 October, scoring Bolton's first goal in a 2–1 win against Harrogate Town.

Doyle finished the season as Bolton's top scorer in all competitions, having scored 19 goals in League Two as his side achieved direct promotion to League One. Plus, he was named in the league's Team of the Year, together with his team-mate Ricardo Almeida Santos.

In January 2022, it was confirmed that, despite leaving Bolton Wanderers for St Patrick's Athletic, Doyle would take up a role as Bolton's scout for the Ireland region and would combine the role with his on-going playing career. This led to Bolton signing Eoin Toal from Doyle's recommendation.

=== St Patrick's Athletic ===
==== 2022 season ====
On 7 January 2022, it was announced that Doyle had returned home to Dublin, signing for League of Ireland Premier Division runners up and current FAI Cup holders St Patrick's Athletic on a three-year deal where he would play under their new manager Tim Clancy, a former teammate of Doyle's at Hibernian. On 11 February 2022, Doyle scored on his debut for the club in the 2022 President of Ireland's Cup against his former club Shamrock Rovers at Tallaght Stadium. On 11 March 2022, Doyle scored his first league goal for the club by heading home a Chris Forrester free kick to help his side to a 2–0 win away to Finn Harps. He followed his first league goal up by opening the scoring in a 2–0 win over UCD at Richmond Park 3 days later. On 22 April, he scored twice, in another 2–0 win over Finn Harps, this time at Richmond Park. On 15 July 2022, Doyle scored his 200th career goal in his 596th career appearance when he opened the scoring in a 1–1 draw at home to Dundalk for his 10th league goal of the season. Doyle made his first appearance in European football for the club on 21 July 2022, assisting Chris Forrester's equaliser in a 1–1 draw with Slovenian side NŠ Mura in the UEFA Europa Conference League. Doyle scored a brace of penalties on 3 October 2022, to help his side to a 4–4 draw having previously trailed 4–2 away to rivals Shelbourne at Tolka Park. His final goals of the season came in the final game of the year on 6 November 2022 when he scored a brace and also assisted a goal for Anthony Breslin in a 4–0 win over Shelbourne to take him up to 15 goals in all competitions in his first season with the club.

==== 2023 season ====
Doyle's first goal of the 2023 season came on 24 February when he came off the bench to score the only goal of the game in a 1–0 home win over rivals Shelbourne, his fifth goal in his last three appearances against them. On 17 March 2023, Doyle scored a penalty to level the scores at 1–1 in an eventual 2–2 draw with rivals Shamrock Rovers at Tallaght Stadium. Doyle's third goal of the season came on 10 April 2023 in a 3–1 win away to Drogheda United. On 5 June 2023, Doyle scored in a 4–1 win over Derry City at Richmond Park, a goal that turned out to be his 208th and final goal of his professional career. Doyle's final appearance in professional football was on 20 July 2023, in a UEFA Europa League tie at home to F91 Dudelange of Luxembourg.

=== Retirement ===
On 27 July 2023, it was announced that Doyle had retired from professional football at age 35 for personal reasons, after scoring 208 goals in 635 appearances during his career.

== Personal life ==
Doyle is a fully qualified electrician. His cousin is former League of Ireland footballer Dave Webster.

== Career statistics ==
As of match played 20 July 2023

Appearances and goals by club, season and competition
Club	Season	League			National Cup (Note: Includes FAI Cup, Scottish Cup & FA Cup)		League Cup (Note: Includes League of Ireland Cup, Scottish League Cup & EFL Cup)		Europe		Other		Total	
Club	Season	Division	Apps	Goals	Apps	Goals	Apps	Goals	Apps	Goals	Apps	Goals	Apps	Goals
Shelbourne	2007	LOI First Division	0	0	0	0	0	0	—		—		0	0
Shamrock Rovers	2007	LOI Premier Division	10	0	—		—		—		—		10	0
Shamrock Rovers	2008	LOI Premier Division	30	5	1	0	2	1	—		—		33	6
Shamrock Rovers	2009	LOI Premier Division	2	0	—		2	0	—		—		4	0
Shamrock Rovers	Total		42	5	1	0	4	1	—		—		47	6
Sligo Rovers	2009	LOI Premier Division	15	3	5	2	—		—		2 (Note: Appearances in Setanta Sports Cup)	0	22	5
Sligo Rovers	2010	LOI Premier Division	35	6	4	0	4	1	—		3	1	46	8
Sligo Rovers	2011	LOI Premier Division	34	20	5	1	3	3	2 (Note: Appearances in UEFA Europa League)	0	4	1	48	25
Sligo Rovers	Total		84	29	14	3	7	4	2	0	9	2	116	38
Hibernian	2011–12	Scottish Premier League	13	1	3	2	0	0	—		—		16	3
Hibernian	2012–13	Scottish Premier League	36	10	4	1	1	0	—		—		41	11
Hibernian	Total		49	11	7	3	1	0	—		—		57	14
Chesterfield	2013–14	League Two	43	11	2	0	1	1	—		5 (Note: Appearance(s) in EFL Trophy)	1	51	13
Chesterfield	2014–15	League One	26	21	6	3	1	1	—		0	0	33	25
Chesterfield	Total		69	32	8	3	2	2	—		5	1	84	38
Cardiff City	2014–15	Championship	16	5	0	0	0	0	—		—		16	5
Cardiff City	2015–16	Championship	0	0	0	0	2	0	—		—		2	0
Cardiff City	Total		16	5	0	0	2	0	—		—		18	5
Preston North End (loan)	2015–16	Championship	28	4	1	0	—		—		—		29	4
Preston North End	2016–17	Championship	11	1	0	0	4	2	—		—		15	3
Portsmouth (loan)	2016–17	League Two	12	2	—		—		—		—		12	2
Oldham Athletic (loan)	2017–18	League One	30	14	1	0	0	0	—		3	2	34	16
Bradford City	2018–19	League One	44	11	4	0	0	0	—		0	0	48	11
Bradford City	2019–20	League Two	6	0	0	0	1	0	—		—		7	0
Bradford City	Total		50	11	4	0	1	0	—		0	0	55	11
Swindon Town (loan)	2019–20	League Two	22	23	0	0	—		—		1	0	23	23
Swindon Town	2019–20	League Two	6	2	—		—		—		—		6	2
Bolton Wanderers	2020–21	League Two	43	19	0	0	1	0	—		1	0	45	19
Bolton Wanderers	2021–22	League One	21	5	1	1	2	0	—		4	2	28	8
Bolton Wanderers	Total		64	24	1	1	3	0	—		5	2	73	27
St Patrick's Athletic	2022	LOI Premier Division	36	14	1	0	—		4 (Note: Appearance(s) in UEFA Europa Conference League)	0	1 (Note: Appearance in President of Ireland's Cup)	1	42	15
St Patrick's Athletic	2023	LOI Premier Division	21	4	0	0	—		1	0	0	0	22	4
St Patrick's Athletic	Total		57	18	1	0	—		5	0	1	1	64	19
Career total			540	181	38	10	24	9	7	0	24	8	633	208

== Honours ==
Sligo Rovers

- FAI Cup: 2010, 2011
- League of Ireland Cup: 2010

Chesterfield

- Football League Two: 2013–14
- Football League Trophy runner-up: 2013–14

Portsmouth

- EFL League Two: 2016–17

Swindon Town

- EFL League Two: 2019–20

Bolton Wanderers

- EFL League Two third-place promotion: 2020–21

Individual

- PFA Team of the Year: 2014–15 League One, 2019–20 League Two, 2020–21 League Two
- Football League One Player of the Month: September 2014
- EFL League Two Player of the Month: October 2019, November 2019, December 2019
- EFL League Two Player of the Year: 2019–20
- EFL League Two Top Scorer: 2019–20
