= Ousmane Fané =

French footballer (born 1993)

Personal information
- Date of birth: 13 December 1993 (age 32)
- Place of birth: Paris, France
- Height: 1.93 m (6 ft 4 in)
- Position: Defensive midfielder

Senior career*
Years	Team	Apps	(Gls)
2009–2010	Bayonne		
2010–2011	Paris		
2012–2014	Racing Paris	16	(0)
2014–2015	GSI Pontivy	3	(0)
2015	Lyn	5	(0)
2016	Kidderminster Harriers	20	(0)
2016–2019	Oldham Athletic	80	(0)
2019–2020	Shrewsbury Town	0	(0)
2020	UiTM	9	(0)
2021	Persiraja Banda Aceh	0	(0)
2021–2022	UiTM	11	(0)
2022–2023	Morecambe	28	(0)
2023	Penang	17	(0)
2024	Khaitan	0	(0)
2024–2025	Persik Kediri	25	(0)
2026	SC Delhi	10	(0)
- * Club domestic league appearances and goals as of 7 March 2026

Ousmane Fané (born 13 December 1993) is a French professional footballer who plays as a defensive midfielder.

== Career ==
Born in Paris, Fané spent his early career in France and Norway with Bayonne, Paris, Racing Paris, GSI Pontivy and FK Lyn. After playing with English club Kidderminster Harriers, he signed a two-year contract with Oldham Athletic in August 2016. At the end of the 2017–18 season, when Oldham were relegated to League Two, the club exercised an option to extend Fané's contract. In July 2018 he broke his leg and dislocated his ankle. He was released by Oldham at the end of the 2018–19 season. On 3 December 2019, Fané signed for League One club Shrewsbury Town on a deal until the end of the season, with an option of a further year. He left the club on 2 January 2020 for personal reasons and moved back to his native France in order to be nearer to his family. In February 2020 he signed for Malaysian club UiTM. In March 2021 he signed for Indonesian club Persiraja Banda Aceh. He returned to UiTM in April 2021. On 18 January 2022, Fané returned to England to join Morecambe, linking back up with former manager Stephen Robinson, who had brought him to Oldham. He left Morecambe by mutual consent on 2 January 2023. On 4 January 2023, Fané returned to Malaysia and signed for Penang. On 15 July 2024, he signed for Indonesian club Persik Kediri. On 13 June 2025, Fané officially left Persik Kediri. In March 2026 he signed for Indian Super League club Delhi.

== Personal life ==
In July 2020, Fané missed the birth of his first child in Paris due to travel restrictions as a result of the COVID-19 pandemic.

== Career statistics ==
As of 23 May 2025

Appearances and goals by club, season and competition
Club	Season	League			National cup		League cup		Other		Total	
Club	Season	Division	Apps	Goals	Apps	Goals	Apps	Goals	Apps	Goals	Apps	Goals
Racing Paris	2012–13	CFA 2	16	0	1	0	0	0	0	0	17	0
GSI Pontivy	2014–15	CFA	3	0	0	0	0	0	0	0	3	0
FK Lyn	2015	2. divisjon	5	0	0	0	0	0	0	0	5	0
Kidderminster Harriers	2015–16	National League	20	0	0	0	0	0	0	0	20	0
Oldham Athletic	2016–17	League One	39	0	1	0	2	0	4	0	46	0
Oldham Athletic	2017–18	League One	41	0	1	0	1	0	2	0	45	0
Oldham Athletic	2018–19	League One	0	0	0	0	0	0	0	0	0	0
Oldham Athletic	Total		80	0	2	0	3	0	6	0	91	0
UiTM FC	2020	Malaysia Super League	9	0	—		—		0	0	9	0
UiTM FC	2021	Malaysia Super League	11	0	—		—		0	0	11	0
UiTM FC	Total		20	0	0	0	0	0	0	0	20	0
Morecambe	2021–22	League One	12	0	0	0	0	0	0	0	12	0
Morecambe	2022–23	League One	16	0	1	0	3	0	3	0	23	0
Morecambe	Total		28	0	1	0	3	0	3	0	35	0
Penang	2023	Malaysia Super League	17	0	0	0	0	0	0	0	17	0
Persik Kediri	2024–25	Liga 1	25	0	0	0	0	0	0	0	25	0
Career total			214	0	4	0	6	0	9	0	233	0
