= List of English football transfers summer 2018 =

The 2018 summer transfer window for English football transfers opened on 17 May and closed on 9 August. Additionally, players without a club could join at any time, clubs could sign players on loan at any time, and clubs could sign a goalkeeper on an emergency loan if they had no registered goalkeeper available. This list includes transfers featuring at least one Premier League or EFL club which were completed after the end of the winter 2017–18 transfer window and before the end of the 2018 summer window.

== 2018 Summer Transfers ==
All players and clubs without a flag are English. Note that while Swansea City, Cardiff City, Newport County and Wrexham are affiliated with the Football Association of Wales and thus take the Welsh flag, they play in the English football league system, and so their transfers are included here.

=== Transfers ===
Date	Name	Moving from	Moving to	Fee
29 August 2017^{[b]}	(Guinea) Naby Keïta	(Germany) RB Leipzig	Liverpool	£48m
5 February 2018	Ben Watson	Watford	Nottingham Forest	Free
10 February 2018	(Denmark) Lasse Vibe	Brentford	(China) Changchun Yatai	Undisclosed
9 March 2018	Andrew Fox	(Sweden) AFC Eskilstuna	Grimsby Town	Free
9 March 2018	Carl Baker	(India) ATK	Coventry City	Free
13 March 2018	Michael Ledger	Sunderland	(Norway) Notodden FK	Undisclosed
16 March 2018^{[b]}	(Denmark) Jonas Lössl	(Germany) 1. FSV Mainz 05	Huddersfield Town	Undisclosed
23 March 2018	(Sweden) Zlatan Ibrahimović	Manchester United	(United States) LA Galaxy	Free
18 April 2018^{[b]}	Uche Ikpeazu	Cambridge United	(Scotland) Hearts	Undisclosed
20 April 2018^{[b]}	(Portugal) Tobias Figueiredo	(Portugal) Sporting CP	Nottingham Forest	Undisclosed
2 May 2018	(Norway) Adama Diomande	Hull City	(United States) Los Angeles FC	Free
4 May 2018	(Germany) Uwe Hünemeier	Brighton & Hove Albion	(Germany) SC Paderborn	Free
4 May 2018^{[b]}	Alex Addai	Merstham	Cheltenham Town	Free
9 May 2018	Drey Wright	Colchester United	(Scotland) St Johnstone	Free
9 May 2018	James Ball	Stockport County	Stevenage	Undisclosed
10 May 2018	Zain Westbrooke	Brentford	Coventry City	Free
10 May 2018	Harry Pell	Cheltenham Town	Colchester United	Undisclosed
10 May 2018	Paul Green	Oldham Athletic	Crewe Alexandra	Free
14 May 2018	(Spain) Pablo Maffeo	Manchester City	(Germany) VfB Stuttgart	Undisclosed
14 May 2018	Scott Brown	Wycombe Wanderers	Port Vale	Free
14 May 2018	(Canada) Scott Arfield	Burnley	(Scotland) Rangers	Free
15 May 2018^{[b]}	Aaron Chapman	Accrington Stanley	Peterborough United	Free
15 May 2018	Sam Barratt	Maidenhead United	Southend United	Undisclosed
16 May 2018	(Antigua and Barbuda) Luther Wildin	Nuneaton Town	Stevenage	Undisclosed
16 May 2018	Johnny Mullins	Luton Town	Cheltenham Town	Free
16 May 2018	(Scotland) Allan McGregor	Hull City	(Scotland) Rangers	Free
16 May 2018	Olly Lee	Luton Town	(Scotland) Hearts	Free
16 May 2018^{[b]}	Rhys Bennett	Mansfield Town	Peterborough United	Free
17 May 2018^{[b]}	(Portugal) Ricardo Pereira	(Portugal) Porto	Leicester City	Undisclosed
17 May 2018^{[b]}	(Ghana) Andy Yiadom	Barnsley	Reading	Free
17 May 2018	Shaun Miller	Carlisle United	Crewe Alexandra	Free
17 May 2018	Ryan Ledson	Oxford United	Preston North End	Undisclosed
17 May 2018	Luke Joyce	Carlisle United	Port Vale	Free
17 May 2018	Brendon Daniels	Alfreton Town	Port Vale	Free
17 May 2018^{[b]}	Tom Anderson	Burnley	Doncaster Rovers	Undisclosed
18 May 2018	Cameron Norman	Kings Lynn	Oxford United	Free
18 May 2018	(Scotland) Jamie Murphy	Brighton & Hove Albion	(Scotland) Rangers	Undisclosed
18 May 2018	Ryan Broom	Bristol Rovers	Cheltenham Town	Free
18 May 2018	Keanan Bennetts	Tottenham Hotspur	(Germany) Borussia Mönchengladbach	Undisclosed
21 May 2018	Andy Williams	Doncaster Rovers	Northampton Town	Free
21 May 2018	Olufela Olomola	Southampton	Scunthorpe United	Free
21 May 2018	Michael Nottingham	Salford City	Blackpool	Free
21 May 2018	Louis John	Sutton United	Cambridge United	Free
22 May 2018	(Nigeria) Leon Balogun	(Germany) 1. FSV Mainz 05	Brighton & Hove Albion	Free
22 May 2018	Andy Cook	Tranmere Rovers	Walsall	Free
22 May 2018	Shwan Jalal	Macclesfield Town	Chesterfield	Free
22 May 2018	Ed Upson	Milton Keynes Dons	Bristol Rovers	Free
22 May 2018	Max Watters	Ashford United	Doncaster Rovers	Free
22 May 2018	Sam Wedgbury	(Wales) Wrexham	Chesterfield	Free
23 May 2018	Leon Legge	Cambridge United	Port Vale	Free
23 May 2018	(Wales) Connell Rawlinson	(Wales) The New Saints	Port Vale	Free
24 May 2018^{[b]}	Colin Daniel	Blackpool	Peterborough United	Free
24 May 2018	Ben Tozer	(Wales) Newport County	Cheltenham Town	Free
25 May 2018	Ben Wilmot	Stevenage	Watford	Undisclosed
25 May 2018	Bailey Vose	Brighton & Hove Albion	Colchester United	Undisclosed
25 May 2018	Conor Thomas	(India) ATK	Cheltenham Town	Free
25 May 2018	Noah Chesmain	Millwall	Colchester United	Free
25 May 2018	(Portugal) Bruno Andrade	Boreham Wood	Lincoln City	Free
25 May 2018	(Scotland) Mark O'Hara	(Scotland) Dundee	Peterborough United	Compensation
25 May 2018	Joe Riley	Manchester United	Bradford City	Undisclosed
25 May 2018^{[a]}	(Romania) Florin Andone	(Spain) Deportivo La Coruña	Brighton & Hove Albion	Undisclosed
27 May 2018	Harry Pritchard	Maidenhead United	Blackpool	Free
28 May 2018^{[b]}	(Brazil) Fabinho	(France) Monaco	Liverpool	£39m
29 May 2018	Chris Hussey	Sheffield United	Cheltenham Town	Free
29 May 2018	Jamal Campbell-Ryce	Carlisle United	Stevenage	Free
29 May 2018	Matt Preston	Swindon Town	Mansfield Town	Undisclosed
30 May 2018	Alex Woodyard	Lincoln City	Peterborough United	Undisclosed
30 May 2018	George Taft	Mansfield Town	Cambridge United	Free
30 May 2018	Dean Parrett	AFC Wimbledon	Gillingham	Free
30 May 2018	(Scotland) Kal Naismith	Portsmouth	Wigan Athletic	Free
30 May 2018	Regan Charles-Cook	Charlton Athletic	Gillingham	Free
30 May 2018	Alex Whitmore	Chesterfield	Grimsby Town	Undisclosed
30 May 2018	(Scotland) Scott Cuthbert	Luton Town	Stevenage	Free
30 May 2018	Michael Dawson	Hull City	Nottingham Forest	Free
30 May 2018	Tom Crawford	Chester City	Notts County	Undisclosed
30 May 2018	Jose Baxter	Everton	Oldham Athletic	Free
30 May 2018	(Slovakia) Martin Dúbravka	(Czech Republic) Sparta Prague	Newcastle United	Undisclosed
31 May 2018	(Northern Ireland) Stephen Dooley	(Northern Ireland) Coleraine	Rochdale	Free
31 May 2018	Kristian Dennis	Chesterfield	Notts County	Undisclosed
31 May 2018	Andy Kellett	Wigan Athletic	Notts County	Free
31 May 2018	(Northern Ireland) Carl Winchester	Cheltenham Town	Forest Green Rovers	Free
31 May 2018	Will Wood	Southampton	Accrington Stanley	Free
31 May 2018	Josh Wright	Southend United	Bradford City	Free
31 May 2018	Reise Allassani	Dulwich Hamlet	Coventry City	Undisclosed
1 June 2018	(Democratic Republic of the Congo) Benik Afobe	AFC Bournemouth	Wolverhampton Wanderers	£10m
1 June 2018	(France) Willy Boly	(Portugal) Porto	Wolverhampton Wanderers	£10m
1 June 2018	Ben Hamer	Leicester City	Huddersfield Town	Free
1 June 2018	Tahvon Campbell	West Bromwich Albion	Forest Green Rovers	Free
1 June 2018	Kane Hemmings	Oxford United	Notts County	Undisclosed
1 June 2018	Manny Oyeleke	Aldershot Town	Port Vale	Free
1 June 2018	(Scotland) Andrew Shinnie	Birmingham City	Luton Town	Free
1 June 2018	Tom Smith	Swindon Town	Cheltenham Town	Free
1 June 2018	(Austria) Konstantin Kerschbaumer	Brentford	(Germany) FC Ingolstadt 04	Undisclosed
4 June 2018	Matt Godden	Stevenage	Peterborough United	Undisclosed
4 June 2018	(Scotland) Craig MacGillivray	Shrewsbury Town	Portsmouth	Undisclosed
4 June 2018	Byron Moore	Bristol Rovers	Bury	Free
4 June 2018	Will Patching	Manchester City	Notts County	Free
4 June 2018	Louis Robles	(Spain) San Roque de Lepe	Grimsby Town	Free
5 June 2018	(Switzerland) Stephan Lichtsteiner	(Italy) Juventus	Arsenal	Free
5 June 2018	Mark Gillespie	Walsall	(Scotland) Motherwell	Free
5 June 2018	George Francomb	AFC Wimbledon	Crawley Town	Free
5 June 2018	Josh Ginnelly	Burnley	Walsall	Free
5 June 2018	(Portugal) Leonardo Da Silva Lopes	Peterborough United	Wigan Athletic	Undisclosed
5 June 2018	(Spain) Santi Cazorla	Arsenal	(Spain) Villarreal	Free
5 June 2018	Ryan Fredericks	Fulham	West Ham United	Free
5 June 2018	(Republic of Ireland) David Meyler	Hull City	Reading	Free
5 June 2018	(Republic of Ireland) Chris Forrester	Peterborough United	(Scotland) Aberdeen	Undisclosed
6 June 2018	(Portugal) Diogo Dalot	(Portugal) Porto	Manchester United	£19m
6 June 2018	Neal Bishop	Scunthorpe United	Mansfield Town	Free
6 June 2018	Junior Brown	Shrewsbury Town	Coventry City	Free
6 June 2018	Michael Crowe	Ipswich Town	Preston North End	Free
6 June 2018	Sam Matthews	AFC Bournemouth	Bristol Rovers	Free
6 June 2018	(Republic of Ireland) John O'Shea	Sunderland	Reading	Free
6 June 2018	Alex Penny	Peterborough United	(Scotland) Hamilton Academical	Undisclosed
7 June 2018	Harry Davis	(Scotland) St Mirren	Grimsby Town	Free
7 June 2018	Conor Grant	Everton	Plymouth Argyle	Free
7 June 2018	Miles Welch-Hayes	Bath City	Macclesfield Town	Undisclosed
7 June 2018	Ethan Ross	West Bromwich Albion	Colchester United	Free
7 June 2018	(Italy) Fabio Borini	Sunderland	(Italy) Milan	Undisclosed
7 June 2018	(Netherlands) Jeremain Lens	Sunderland	(Turkey) Beşiktaş	Undisclosed
8 June 2018	(Northern Ireland) Jonny Evans	West Bromwich Albion	Leicester City	£3.5m
8 June 2018	Jason Lowe	Birmingham City	Bolton Wanderers	Free
8 June 2018^{[b]}	(Spain) Vicente Guaita	(Spain) Getafe	Crystal Palace	Free
8 June 2018	(Argentina) Emiliano Buendía	(Spain) Getafe	Norwich City	Undisclosed
8 June 2018	(Netherlands) Terence Kongolo	(France) Monaco	Huddersfield Town	£17.5m
8 June 2018^{[b]}	(Republic of Ireland) Damien Delaney	Crystal Palace	(Republic of Ireland) Cork City	Free
8 June 2018	Frank Nouble	(Wales) Newport County	Colchester United	Free
8 June 2018	(Republic of Ireland) Niall Canavan	Rochdale	Plymouth Argyle	Free
8 June 2018	Joseph Mills	(Australia) Perth Glory	Forest Green Rovers	Free
8 June 2018	Tom Naylor	Burton Albion	Portsmouth	Free
9 June 2018	Freddie Ladapo	Southend United	Plymouth Argyle	Free
10 June 2018	(Italy) Pierluigi Gollini	Aston Villa	(Italy) Atalanta	Undisclosed
10 June 2018	Kieran Kennedy	Macclesfield Town	Shrewsbury Town	Undisclosed
10 June 2018	Fejiri Okenabirhie	Dagenham and Redbridge	Shrewsbury Town	Undisclosed
10 June 2018	Joe Riley	Shrewsbury Town	Plymouth Argyle	Free
11 June 2018	Lee Brown	Bristol Rovers	Portsmouth	Free
11 June 2018	Calum Dyson	Everton	Plymouth Argyle	Free
11 June 2018	(Nigeria) Oghenekaro Etebo	(Portugal) Feirense	Stoke City	£6.35m
11 June 2018	(Spain) Madger Gomes	Leeds United	(France) Sochaux	Undisclosed
11 June 2018	(Sweden) Sebastian Larsson	Hull City	(Sweden) AIK	Free
11 June 2018	Ashley Nathaniel-George	Hendon	Crawley Town	Free
11 June 2018	(Republic of Ireland) Michael Timlin	Southend United	Stevenage	Free
11 June 2018	(Spain) Gerard Deulofeu	(Spain) Barcelona	Watford	£11.5m
12 June 2018	Josh Murphy	Norwich City	(Wales) Cardiff City	£11m
12 June 2018	Sonny Bradley	Plymouth Argyle	Luton Town	Free
12 June 2018	Paul Farman	Lincoln City	Stevenage	Undisclosed
12 June 2018	(Sweden) Thomas Isherwood	(Germany) Bayern Munich II	Bradford City	Undisclosed
12 June 2018	Ezri Konsa	Charlton Athletic	Brentford	Undisclosed
12 June 2018	Harry Toffolo	Millwall	Lincoln City	Free
12 June 2018	(Egypt) Ramadan Sobhi	Stoke City	Huddersfield Town	£5.7m
12 June 2018	(Republic of Ireland) John O'Sullivan	Carlisle United	Blackpool	Free
12 June 2018	Josh Rees	Bromley	Gillingham	Undisclosed
12 June 2018	Jordan Storey	Exeter City	Preston North End	Undisclosed
12 June 2018	(Wales) George Williams	Fulham	Forest Green Rovers	Free
12 June 2018	(Scotland) Jason Naismith	(Scotland) Ross County	Peterborough United	Undisclosed
13 June 2018	(Republic of Ireland) Greg Cunningham	Preston North End	(Wales) Cardiff City	Undisclosed
13 June 2018	Connor Goldson	Brighton & Hove Albion	(Scotland) Rangers	Undisclosed
13 June 2018	Jonson Clarke-Harris	Rotherham United	Coventry City	Free
13 June 2018	Erhun Oztumer	Walsall	Bolton Wanderers	Free
13 June 2018	Emmanuel Sonupe	Kidderminster Harriers	Stevenage	Undisclosed
13 June 2018	Chris Taylor	Bolton Wanderers	Blackpool	Free
13 June 2018	(Republic of Ireland) Graham Burke	(Republic of Ireland) Shamrock Rovers	Preston North End	Undisclosed
14 June 2018	(Wales) Jordan Williams	Liverpool	Rochdale	Free
14 June 2018	(Haiti) Duckens Nazon	Wolverhampton Wanderers	(Belgium) Sint-Truidense	Undisclosed
14 June 2018	(Republic of Ireland) Anthony O'Connor	(Scotland) Aberdeen	Bradford City	Free
14 June 2018	(Northern Ireland) Jordan Thompson	(Scotland) Rangers	Blackpool	Free
14 June 2018	(Portugal) João Carvalho	(Portugal) Benfica	Nottingham Forest	£13.2m
15 June 2018	Darius Charles	AFC Wimbledon	Wycombe Wanderers	Free
15 June 2018	Elliott Whitehouse	Lincoln City	Grimsby Town	Free
15 June 2018	(Austria) Christoph Knasmüllner	Barnsley	(Austria) Rapid Wien	Undisclosed
15 June 2018	(Spain) Marc Navarro	(Spain) Espanyol	Watford	Undisclosed
15 June 2018	Mitchell Pinnock	Dover Athletic	AFC Wimbledon	Tribunal
15 June 2018	Tom Hopper	Scunthorpe United	Southend United	Free
15 June 2018	Marley Watkins	Norwich City	Bristol City	£1m
18 June 2018	Nathan Blissett	Plymouth Argyle	Macclesfield Town	Free
18 June 2018	Fraser Franks	Stevenage	(Wales) Newport County	Free
18 June 2018	(Portugal) Rui Patrício	(Portugal) Sporting CP	Wolverhampton Wanderers	Free
18 June 2018	Jermaine McGlashan	Southend United	Swindon Town	Free
19 June 2018	Chris Dunn	(Wales) Wrexham	Walsall	Free
19 June 2018	(Wales) Craig Morgan	Wigan Athletic	Fleetwood Town	Free
19 June 2018	Louis Reed	Sheffield United	Peterborough United	Undisclosed
19 June 2018	(France) Issa Diop	(France) Toulouse	West Ham United	£22m
19 June 2018	Ryan Allsop	AFC Bournemouth	Wycombe Wanderers	Free
19 June 2018	Chris Dagnall	Crewe Alexandra	Bury	Free
19 June 2018	Jordan Moore-Taylor	Exeter City	Milton Keynes Dons	Free
19 June 2018	(Republic of Ireland) Stephen Gleeson	Ipswich Town	(Scotland) Aberdeen	Free
19 June 2018	(Germany) Felix Wiedwald	Leeds United	(Germany) Eintracht Frankfurt	Undisclosed
20 June 2018	(Poland) Łukasz Fabiański	(Wales) Swansea City	West Ham United	£7m
20 June 2018	(Scotland) Gary Miller	Plymouth Argyle	Carlisle United	Free
20 June 2018	Ryan Watson	Barnet	Milton Keynes Dons	Free
20 June 2018	Macaulay Gillesphey	Newcastle United	Carlisle United	Free
20 June 2018	(Netherlands) Juninho Bacuna	(Netherlands) Groningen	Huddersfield Town	Undisclosed
20 June 2018	James Maddison	Norwich City	Leicester City	Undisclosed
20 June 2018	(Scotland) Murray Wallace	Scunthorpe United	Millwall	Undisclosed
20 June 2018	(Northern Ireland) Michael O'Connor	Notts County	Lincoln City	Free
20 June 2018^{[b]}	(Germany) Bernd Leno	(Germany) Bayer Leverkusen	Arsenal	£19.3m
21 June 2018	(Brazil) Fred	(Ukraine) Shakhtar Donetsk	Manchester United	£47m
21 June 2018	Will Aimson	Blackpool	Bury	Free
21 June 2018	Joel Byrom	Mansfield Town	Stevenage	Free
21 June 2018	Carl Dickinson	Notts County	Yeovil Town	Free
21 June 2018	George Glendon	Fleetwood Town	Carlisle United	Free
21 June 2018	Mitch Hancox	Macclesfield Town	Milton Keynes Dons	Free
21 June 2018	Zak Mills	Grimsby Town	Morecambe	Free
21 June 2018	Rhys Oates	Hartlepool United	Morecambe	Free
21 June 2018	(Germany) Emre Can	Liverpool	(Italy) Juventus	Free
21 June 2018	(Wales) Andrew Hughes	Peterborough United	Preston North End	Undisclosed
21 June 2018	(Turkey) Alim Öztürk	(Turkey) Boluspor	Sunderland	Free
21 June 2018	Connor Wood	Leicester City	Bradford City	Undisclosed
21 June 2018	(Argentina) Ramiro Funes Mori	Everton	(Spain) Villarreal	Undisclosed
21 June 2018	Jon Flanagan	Liverpool	(Scotland) Rangers	Free
22 June 2018	Jordan Cook	Luton Town	Grimsby Town	Free
22 June 2018	Jamie Grimes	Cheltenham Town	Macclesfield Town	Free
22 June 2018	Harry Lennon	Charlton Athletic	Southend United	Undisclosed
22 June 2018	(United States) Eric Lichaj	Nottingham Forest	Hull City	Undisclosed
22 June 2018	Ricky Miller	Peterborough United	Port Vale	Undisclosed
22 June 2018	Joe Rothwell	Oxford United	Blackburn Rovers	Undisclosed
22 June 2018	Ben Stephens	Stratford Town	Macclesfield Town	Undisclosed
22 June 2018	Jeff King	Bolton Wanderers	(Scotland) St Mirren	Free
22 June 2018	Max Clark	Hull City	(Netherlands) Vitesse	Undisclosed
22 June 2018	(Ivory Coast) Siriki Dembélé	Grimsby Town	Peterborough United	Undisclosed
22 June 2018	Sam Mantom	Scunthorpe United	Southend United	Undisclosed
25 June 2018	Jake Hessenthaler	Gillingham	Grimsby Town	Free
25 June 2018	Grant Smith	Boreham Wood	Lincoln City	Free
25 June 2018^{[b]}	(Germany) Robert Tesche	Birmingham City	(Germany) VfL Bochum	Free
25 June 2018	(Ivory Coast) Max Gradel	AFC Bournemouth	(France) Toulouse	Undisclosed
25 June 2018	(Denmark) Kristian Pedersen	(Germany) Union Berlin	Birmingham City	Undisclosed
25 June 2018	(Scotland) Chris Maguire	Bury	Sunderland	Free
25 June 2018	(Scotland) Jon McLaughlin	(Scotland) Hearts	Sunderland	Free
25 June 2018	Paul Mullin	Swindon Town	Tranmere Rovers	Undisclosed
25 June 2018	John Welsh	Preston North End	Grimsby Town	Free
25 June 2018	Aaron Wilbraham	Bolton Wanderers	Rochdale	Free
25 June 2018	Aaron McGowan	Morecambe	(Scotland) Hamilton Academical	Free
25 June 2018	Sam Kelly	Grimsby Town	(Scotland) Hamilton Academical	Free
25 June 2018	Aaron Smith	Nottingham Forest	(Scotland) Hamilton Academical	Free
26 June 2018	(Barbados) Jonathan Forte	Notts County	Exeter City	Free
26 June 2018	James Hanson	Sheffield United	AFC Wimbledon	Undisclosed
26 June 2018	Johnny Hunt	Mansfield Town	Stevenage	Free
26 June 2018	Zeli Ismail	Bury	Walsall	Free
26 June 2018	(Germany) Moritz Leitner	(Germany) FC Augsburg	Norwich City	Undisclosed
26 June 2018	(Republic of Ireland) Sean Long	Lincoln City	Cheltenham Town	Free
26 June 2018	(Northern Ireland) Paddy McNair	Sunderland	Middlesbrough	Undisclosed
26 June 2018	Matty Pearson	Barnsley	Luton Town	Undisclosed
26 June 2018	Ashley Smith-Brown	Manchester City	Plymouth Argyle	Undisclosed
26 June 2018	Abu Ogogo	Shrewsbury Town	Coventry City	Free
26 June 2018	(Scotland) Stuart Armstrong	(Scotland) Celtic	Southampton	£7m
26 June 2018	(Jamaica) Clayton Donaldson	Sheffield United	Bolton Wanderers	Free
27 June 2018	(Spain) Marc Muniesa	Stoke City	(Spain) Girona	Undisclosed
27 June 2018	(Serbia) Dusan Tadic	Southampton	(Netherlands) Ajax	£10m
27 June 2018	Aden Flint	Bristol City	Middlesbrough	£7m
27 June 2018	(Scotland) Peter Grant	(Scotland) Falkirk	Plymouth Argyle	Free
27 June 2018	Piero Mingoia	Cambridge United	Accrington Stanley	Free
27 June 2018	(Montserrat) Lyle Taylor	AFC Wimbledon	Charlton Athletic	Free
27 June 2018	Luke Norris	Swindon Town	Colchester United	Undisclosed
27 June 2018	Scott Wootton	Milton Keynes Dons	Plymouth Argyle	Free
27 June 2018	Jason Oswell	Stockport County	Morecambe	Undisclosed
27 June 2018	Richard O'Donnell	Northampton Town	Bradford City	Free
27 June 2018	Ollie Palmer	Lincoln City	Crawley Town	Undisclosed
28 June 2018	Bobby Reid	Bristol City	(Wales) Cardiff City	£10m
28 June 2018	(Bermuda) Reggie Lambe	Carlisle United	Cambridge United	Free
28 June 2018	Tony McMahon	Bradford City	Oxford United	Free
28 June 2018	Isaac Pearce	Fulham	Forest Green Rovers	Free
28 June 2018	(Wales) Liam Shephard	Peterborough United	Forest Green Rovers	Undisclosed
28 June 2018	Theo Vassell	Gateshead	Port Vale	Free
28 June 2018	Jordan Roberts	Crawley Town	Ipswich Town	Free
28 June 2018	Alex Smithies	Queens Park Rangers	(Wales) Cardiff City	£3.5m
28 June 2018	Jake Caprice	Leyton Orient	Tranmere Rovers	Free
28 June 2018	(Northern Ireland) Tom Flanagan	Burton Albion	Sunderland	Free
28 June 2018	Brian Galach	Aldershot Town	Crawley Town	Free
28 June 2018	Gary Warren	(Scotland) Inverness CT	Yeovil Town	Undisclosed
28 June 2018	Adam Webster	Ipswich Town	Bristol City	Undisclosed
29 June 2018	(Norway) Mohamed Elyounoussi	(Switzerland) Basel	Southampton	£16m
29 June 2018	(South Korea) Ki Sung-yueng	(Wales) Swansea City	Newcastle United	Free
29 June 2018	Andy Dales	Mickleover Sports	Scunthorpe United	Undisclosed
29 June 2018	(Wales) Craig Davies	Oldham Athletic	Mansfield Town	Undisclosed
29 June 2018	(France) Timothée Dieng	Bradford City	Southend United	Free
29 June 2018	(Pakistan) Otis Khan	Yeovil Town	Mansfield Town	Undisclosed
29 June 2018	(Scotland) Clark Robertson	Blackpool	Rotherham United	Free
29 June 2018	(Algeria) Hillal Soudani	(Croatia) Dinamo Zagreb	Nottingham Forest	Undisclosed
29 June 2018	Andrew Tutte	Bury	Morecambe	Free
29 June 2018	Kyle Vassell	Blackpool	Rotherham United	Free
29 June 2018	(Sweden) Gustav Engvall	Bristol City	(Belgium) Mechelen	Undisclosed
30 June 2018	(Finland) Teemu Pukki	(Denmark) Brøndby	Norwich City	Free
30 June 2018	Ben Marshall	Wolverhampton Wanderers	Norwich City	Undisclosed
30 June 2018	Jack Robinson	Queens Park Rangers	Nottingham Forest	Free
30 June 2018	(Portugal) Diogo Jota	(Spain) Atlético Madrid	Wolverhampton Wanderers	Undisclosed
30 June 2018	(Brazil) Léo Bonatini	(Saudi Arabia) Al-Hilal	Wolverhampton Wanderers	Undisclosed
30 June 2018	(Portugal) Rúben Vinagre	(France) Monaco	Wolverhampton Wanderers	Undisclosed
1 July 2018	(Wales) David Brooks	Sheffield United	AFC Bournemouth	Undisclosed
1 July 2018	Joe Felix	Fulham	Queens Park Rangers	Free
1 July 2018	(Germany) Toni Leistner	(Germany) Union Berlin	Queens Park Rangers	Free
2 July 2018	Hakeeb Adelakun	Scunthorpe United	Bristol City	Free
2 July 2018	(Italy) Adam Masina	(Italy) Bologna	Watford	Undisclosed
2 July 2018	(Greece) Sokratis Papastathopoulos	(Germany) Borussia Dortmund	Arsenal	Undisclosed
2 July 2018	Barry Fuller	AFC Wimbledon	Gillingham	Free
2 July 2018	Brandon Hanlan	Charlton Athletic	Gillingham	Free
2 July 2018	Luke Hyam	Ipswich Town	Southend United	Free
2 July 2018	Nicky Law	Bradford City	Exeter City	Free
2 July 2018	(Scotland) Dylan McGeouch	(Scotland) Hibernian	Sunderland	Free
2 July 2018	Alex Rodman	Shrewsbury Town	Bristol Rovers	Free
2 July 2018	Theo Widdrington	Portsmouth	Bristol Rovers	Free
2 July 2018	Morgan Williams	Mickleover Sports	Coventry City	Undisclosed
2 July 2018	Reece James	Wigan Athletic	Sunderland	Free
2 July 2018	Jacob Davenport	Manchester City	Blackburn Rovers	Undisclosed
3 July 2018	(Gabon) Johan Branger	(France) Dieppe	Oldham Athletic	Free
3 July 2018	(Wales) Jordan Cranston	Cheltenham Town	Morecambe	Free
3 July 2018	(Australia) Adam Federici	AFC Bournemouth	Stoke City	Undisclosed
3 July 2018	Lee Grant	Stoke City	Manchester United	Undisclosed
3 July 2018	Sam Johnstone	Manchester United	West Bromwich Albion	£6.5m
3 July 2018	(Romania) Costel Pantilimon	Watford	Nottingham Forest	Undisclosed
3 July 2018	(Republic of Ireland) Callum Reilly	Bury	Gillingham	Undisclosed
3 July 2018	(Scotland) Gavin Reilly	(Scotland) St Mirren	Bristol Rovers	Free
3 July 2018	(Austria) Andreas Weimann	Derby County	Bristol City	Undisclosed
4 July 2018	(Nigeria) Hope Akpan	Burton Albion	Bradford City	Free
4 July 2018	(Netherlands) Enzio Boldewijn	Crawley Town	Notts County	Undisclosed
4 July 2018	Adam Collin	Notts County	Carlisle United	Free
4 July 2018	(Australia) Brad Inman	Peterborough United	Rochdale	Free
4 July 2018	(Wales) Lloyd James	Exeter City	Forest Green Rovers	Undisclosed
4 July 2018	Harry Smith	Millwall	Macclesfield Town	Free
5 July 2018	(Scotland) Scott Fraser	(Scotland) Dundee United	Burton Albion	Free
5 July 2018	Mark Howard	Bolton Wanderers	Blackpool	Free
5 July 2018	Dominic Poleon	Bradford City	Crawley Town	Undisclosed
5 July 2018	(Scotland) David Templeton	(Scotland) Hamilton Academical	Burton Albion	Free
5 July 2018	(Brazil) Bernardo	(Germany) RB Leipzig	Brighton & Hove Albion	£9m
5 July 2018	Ben Foster	West Bromwich Albion	Watford	Undisclosed
5 July 2018	(Sweden) Ken Sema	(Sweden) Östersund	Watford	Undisclosed
6 July 2018	Jordan Houghton	Chelsea	Milton Keynes Dons	Free
6 July 2018	Jack Hunt	Sheffield Wednesday	Bristol City	Undisclosed
6 July 2018	Tom Miller	Carlisle United	Bury	Free
6 July 2018	(Wales) David Vaughan	Nottingham Forest	Notts County	Free
6 July 2018	John Akinde	Barnet	Lincoln City	Undisclosed
6 July 2018	(Scotland) Stevie Mallan	Barnsley	(Scotland) Hibernian	Undisclosed
6 July 2018	Alex Nicholls	Barnet	Crewe Alexandra	Free
6 July 2018	Lewis Grabban	AFC Bournemouth	Nottingham Forest	Undisclosed
6 July 2018	(Algeria) Saïd Benrahma	(France) Nice	Brentford	Undisclosed
6 July 2018	(Wales) Josh Yorwerth	Crawley Town	Peterborough United	Undisclosed
6 July 2018	(Scotland) Marc McNulty	Coventry City	Reading	Undisclosed
6 July 2018	Brandon Mason	Watford	Coventry City	Free
9 July 2018	Jack Wilshere	Arsenal	West Ham United	Free
9 July 2018	Mark Halstead	Southport	Morecambe	Free
9 July 2018	Ryan Harley	Exeter City	Milton Keynes Dons	Free
9 July 2018	Robbie Simpson	Exeter City	Milton Keynes Dons	Free
9 July 2018	(Serbia) David Milinković	(Italy) Genoa	Hull City	Undisclosed
9 July 2018	Hakeem Odoffin	Wolverhampton Wanderers	Northampton Town	Free
10 July 2018	Reece Burke	West Ham United	Hull City	Undisclosed
10 July 2018	(Scotland) Ali Crawford	(Scotland) Hamilton Academical	Doncaster Rovers	Free
10 July 2018	Jonathan Flatt	Wolverhampton Wanderers	Scunthorpe United	Free
10 July 2018	Alex Gilliead	Newcastle United	Shrewsbury Town	Free
10 July 2018	(Poland) Paweł Olkowski	(Germany) 1. FC Köln	Bolton Wanderers	Free
10 July 2018	Steven Taylor	Peterborough United	(New Zealand) Wellington Phoenix	Undisclosed
10 July 2018	Angus Gunn	Manchester City	Southampton	£13.5m
10 July 2018	(Algeria) Riyad Mahrez	Leicester City	Manchester City	£60m
10 July 2018	(Uruguay) Lucas Torreira	(Italy) Sampdoria	Arsenal	£26.4m
10 July 2018	(Nigeria) Josh Debayo	Leicester City	Cheltenham Town	Free
11 July 2018	(France) Matteo Guendouzi	(France) FC Lorient	Arsenal	£8m
11 July 2018	(Ukraine) Andriy Yarmolenko	(Germany) Borussia Dortmund	West Ham United	Undisclosed
11 July 2018	Scott Wagstaff	Gillingham	AFC Wimbledon	Free
11 July 2018	(Netherlands) Jordy de Wijs	(Netherlands) PSV Eindhoven	Hull City	Undisclosed
12 July 2018	(France) Maxime Le Marchand	(France) Nice	Fulham	Undisclosed
12 July 2018	(Ivory Coast) Jean Michaël Seri	(France) Nice	Fulham	Undisclosed
12 July 2018	(Republic of the Congo) Prince Oniangué	Wolverhampton Wanderers	(France) SM Caen	Undisclosed
12 July 2018	Jordan Archer	Chester	Bury	Undisclosed
12 July 2018	Anthony Wordsworth	Southend United	AFC Wimbledon	Free
12 July 2018	(Spain) Mikel Merino	Newcastle United	(Spain) Real Sociedad	Undisclosed
13 July 2018	(Wales) Aaron Amadi-Holloway	Oldham Athletic	Shrewsbury Town	Undisclosed
13 July 2018	(Benin) Sessi D'Almeida	Blackpool	Yeovil Town	Free
13 July 2018	(Germany) Erik Durm	(Germany) Borussia Dortmund	Huddersfield Town	Undisclosed
13 July 2018	(Jamaica) Junior Morias	Peterborough United	Northampton Town	Undisclosed
13 July 2018	(Switzerland) Xherdan Shaqiri	Stoke City	Liverpool	£13m
13 July 2018	(Denmark) Jannik Vestergaard	(Germany) Borussia Mönchengladbach	Southampton	Undisclosed
13 July 2018	(Northern Ireland) Gavin Whyte	(Northern Ireland) Crusaders	Oxford United	Undisclosed
14 July 2018	(Paraguay) Fabián Balbuena	(Brazil) Corinthians	West Ham United	Undisclosed
14 July 2018	(Italy) Jorginho	(Italy) Napoli	Chelsea	Undisclosed
14 July 2018	(Sweden) Joel Asoro	Sunderland	(Wales) Swansea City	Undisclosed
15 July 2018	(Brazil) Felipe Anderson	(Italy) Lazio	West Ham United	Undisclosed
16 July 2018	Kyle Bartley	(Wales) Swansea City	West Bromwich Albion	Undisclosed
16 July 2018	Chris Stokes	Coventry City	Bury	Free
16 July 2018	(Netherlands) Thomas Verheydt	Crawley Town	(Netherlands) Go Ahead Eagles	Undisclosed
16 July 2018	Jonathan Bond	Reading	West Bromwich Albion	Free
16 July 2018	Terell Thomas	Wigan Athletic	AFC Wimbledon	Undisclosed
16 July 2018	David Button	Fulham	Brighton & Hove Albion	Undisclosed
17 July 2018	Marc Bola	Arsenal	Blackpool	Free
17 July 2018	(Wales) Gwion Edwards	Peterborough United	Ipswich Town	Undisclosed
17 July 2018	(Netherlands) Daley Blind	Manchester United	(Netherlands) Ajax	£14m
17 July 2018	Jak McCourt	Chesterfield	Swindon Town	Free
17 July 2018	(Northern Ireland) Ryan McLaughlin	Oldham Athletic	Blackpool	Undisclosed
17 July 2018	James Horsfield	(Netherlands) NAC Breda	Scunthorpe United	Free
17 July 2018	(Tunisia) Wahbi Khazri	Sunderland	(France) Saint-Étienne	Undisclosed
17 July 2018	(Netherlands) Darren Sidoel	(Netherlands) Jong Ajax	Reading	Undisclosed
17 July 2018	(Mali) Yves Bissouma	(France) Lille	Brighton & Hove Albion	Undisclosed
17 July 2018	Isaac Buckley-Ricketts	Manchester City	Peterborough United	Undisclosed
18 July 2018	George Long	Sheffield United	Hull City	Undisclosed
18 July 2018	(Brazil) Fábio	Middlesbrough	(France) Nantes	Undisclosed
18 July 2018	(Scotland) Jamie Mackie	Queens Park Rangers	Oxford United	Free
18 July 2018^{[c]}	Christian Oxlade-Chamberlain	Portsmouth	Notts County	Free
18 July 2018	(France) Toumani Diagouraga	Fleetwood Town	Swindon Town	Free
18 July 2018	Anton Walkes	Tottenham Hotspur	Portsmouth	Undisclosed
19 July 2018	Steve Arnold	Barrow	Shrewsbury Town	Free
19 July 2018	(Republic of Ireland) John Egan	Brentford	Sheffield United	Undisclosed
19 July 2018	(Portugal) Filipe Morais	Bolton Wanderers	Crawley Town	Free
19 July 2018	Alex Reid	Fleetwood Town	Stevenage	Undisclosed
19 July 2018	(Republic of Ireland) Sean Scannell	Huddersfield Town	Bradford City	Undisclosed
19 July 2018	(France) Romain Vincelot	Bradford City	Crawley Town	Undisclosed
19 July 2018	(Brazil) Alisson	(Italy) Roma	Liverpool	Undisclosed
20 July 2018	(Netherlands) Florian Jozefzoon	Brentford	Derby County	Undisclosed
20 July 2018	(France) Adama Diakhaby	(France) Monaco	Huddersfield Town	Undisclosed
20 July 2018	Billy Jones	Sunderland	Rotherham United	Free
20 July 2018	(South Africa) Percy Tau	(South Africa) Mamelodi Sundowns	Brighton & Hove Albion	Undisclosed
20 July 2018	James Wallace	Tranmere Rovers	Fleetwood Town	Free
20 July 2018	Chris Long	Burnley	Fleetwood Town	Free
20 July 2018	Callum McManaman	Sunderland	Wigan Athletic	Undisclosed
20 July 2018	(Wales) Rhys Taylor	AFC Fylde	Macclesfield Town	Free
20 July 2018	(Netherlands) Glenn Loovens	Sheffield Wednesday	Sunderland	Free
20 July 2018	(Wales) Danny Ward	Liverpool	Leicester City	£12.5m
22 July 2018	Korrey Henry	West Ham United	Yeovil Town	Free
22 July 2018	(Republic of Ireland) James McClean	West Bromwich Albion	Stoke City	£5m
23 July 2018	(Democratic Republic of the Congo) Chancel Mbemba	Newcastle United	(Portugal) Porto	Undisclosed
23 July 2018	Michael Doughty	Peterborough United	Swindon Town	Free
23 July 2018	(Sudan) Mohamed Eisa	Cheltenham Town	Bristol City	Undisclosed
23 July 2018	(Wales) Ellis Harrison	Bristol Rovers	Ipswich Town	Undisclosed
23 July 2018	Josh Laurent	Wigan Athletic	Shrewsbury Town	Undisclosed
23 July 2018	Tareiq Holmes-Dennis	Huddersfield Town	Bristol Rovers	Undisclosed
24 July 2018	(Spain) Fabricio	(Turkey) Beşiktaş	Fulham	Undisclosed
24 July 2018	(Portugal) João Moutinho	(France) Monaco	Wolverhampton Wanderers	£5m
24 July 2018	(Brazil) Richarlison	Watford	Everton	£35m
24 July 2018	Tom Ince	Huddersfield Town	Stoke City	£10m
24 July 2018	(Netherlands) Tim Krul	Brighton & Hove Albion	Norwich City	Free
24 July 2018	Lee Martin	Gillingham	Exeter City	Free
24 July 2018	(Republic of Ireland) David McGoldrick	Ipswich Town	Sheffield United	Free
24 July 2018	(Australia) Jimmy Oates	Hereford	Exeter City	Free
24 July 2018	Dominic Telford	Stoke City	Bury	Free
24 July 2018	Charles Vernam	Derby County	Grimsby Town	Undisclosed
24 July 2018	(Republic of Ireland) Marc Wilson	Sunderland	Bolton Wanderers	Free
24 July 2018	(Spain) Diego Rico	(Spain) Leganés	AFC Bournemouth	Undisclosed
25 July 2018	(Iran) Alireza Jahanbakhsh	(Netherlands) AZ Alkmaar	Brighton & Hove Albion	Undisclosed
25 July 2018	Sam Walker	Colchester United	Reading	Free
25 July 2018	Tom Conlon	Stevenage	Port Vale	Free
25 July 2018	(Morocco) Nordin Amrabat	Watford	(Saudi Arabia) Al-Nassr	Undisclosed
26 July 2018	Robert Green	Huddersfield Town	Chelsea	Free
26 July 2018	(Switzerland) Fabian Schär	(Spain) Deportivo La Coruña	Newcastle United	£3m
26 July 2018	(Netherlands) Manny Duku	Hayes & Yeading United	Cheltenham Town	Free
26 July 2018	Kurtis Guthrie	Colchester United	Stevenage	Free
26 July 2018	Jack Marriott	Peterborough United	Derby County	Undisclosed
27 July 2018	(Australia) Kenny Dougall	(Netherlands) Sparta Rotterdam	Barnsley	Free
27 July 2018	(Netherlands) Davy Klaassen	Everton	(Germany) Werder Bremen	Undisclosed
27 July 2018	(France) Donovan Makoma	Barrow	Stevenage	Undisclosed
28 July 2018	Jack Baldwin	Peterborough United	Sunderland	Undisclosed
28 July 2018	(Scotland) Barry Douglas	Wolverhampton Wanderers	Leeds United	Undisclosed
28 July 2018	(Republic of Ireland) Liam McAlinden	Exeter City	Cheltenham Town	Free
28 July 2018	Conor Townsend	Scunthorpe United	West Bromwich Albion	Undisclosed
28 July 2018	Ben Wilson	Cardiff City	Bradford City	Free
30 July 2018	Sam Baldock	Brighton & Hove Albion	Reading	Undisclosed
30 July 2018	(France) Mathieu Baudry	Doncaster Rovers	Milton Keynes Dons	Free
30 July 2018	Callum Cooke	Middlesbrough	Peterborough United	Undisclosed
30 July 2018	Jack Hobbs	Nottingham Forest	Bolton Wanderers	Free
30 July 2018	(France) Julian Jeanvier	(France) Stade de Reims	Brentford	Undisclosed
30 July 2018	(Northern Ireland) Josh Magennis	Charlton Athletic	Bolton Wanderers	Undisclosed
30 July 2018	Dean Marney	Burnley	Fleetwood Town	Free
30 July 2018	(Serbia) Aleksandar Mitrović	Newcastle United	Fulham	Undisclosed
30 July 2018	Chris O'Grady	Chesterfield	Oldham Athletic	Free
30 July 2018	Luke O'Nien	Wycombe Wanderers	Sunderland	Undisclosed
31 July 2018	Patrick Bamford	Middlesbrough	Leeds United	£10m
31 July 2018	(Kosovo) Bersant Celina	Manchester City	(Wales) Swansea City	Undisclosed
31 July 2018	Paul Digby	Mansfield Town	Forest Green Rovers	Undisclosed
31 July 2018	George Evans	Reading	Derby County	Undisclosed
31 July 2018	Nicky Hunt	Notts County	Crewe Alexandra	Free
31 July 2018	(Scotland) Barrie McKay	Nottingham Forest	(Wales) Swansea City	Undisclosed
31 July 2018	Kelvin Mellor	Blackpool	Bradford City	Free
31 July 2018	(Netherlands) Philippe Sandler	(Netherlands) PEC Zwolle	Manchester City	Undisclosed
1 August 2018	Tarryn Allarakhia	Colchester United	Crawley Town	Free
1 August 2018	(France) Lucas Digne	(Spain) Barcelona	Everton	£18m
1 August 2018	(Republic of Ireland) Eoin Doyle	Preston North End	Bradford City	Undisclosed
1 August 2018	(Senegal) Cheikhou Kouyaté	West Ham United	Crystal Palace	Undisclosed
1 August 2018	(Finland) Niki Mäenpää	Brighton & Hove Albion	Bristol City	Free
1 August 2018	(Morocco) David Sesay	Watford	Crawley Town	Free
1 August 2018	Luke Steele	Bristol City	Nottingham Forest	Free
1 August 2018	Ronaldo Vieira	Leeds United	(Italy) Sampdoria	Undisclosed
1 August 2018	Charlie Wyke	Bradford City	Sunderland	Undisclosed
2 August 2018	Kean Bryan	Manchester City	Sheffield United	Free
2 August 2018	Anthony Grant	Peterborough United	Shrewsbury Town	Undisclosed
2 August 2018	Jordy Hiwula	Huddersfield Town	Coventry City	Undisclosed
2 August 2018	Paul Jones	Norwich City	Fleetwood Town	Free
2 August 2018	Andy Lonergan	Leeds United	Middlesbrough	Free
2 August 2018	Alfie Mawson	(Wales) Swansea City	Fulham	£20m
2 August 2018	Rod McDonald	Coventry City	AFC Wimbledon	Undisclosed
2 August 2018	(Germany) Max Meyer	(Germany) FC Schalke 04	Crystal Palace	Free
2 August 2018	Stuart Moore	Swindon Town	Milton Keynes Dons	Free
2 August 2018	Luke Murphy	Leeds United	Bolton Wanderers	Free
2 August 2018	(Japan) Yoshinori Mutō	(Germany) 1. FSV Mainz 05	Newcastle United	Undisclosed
2 August 2018	(Portugal) Xande Silva	(Portugal) Vitória Guimarães	West Ham United	Undisclosed
2 August 2018	Luke Simpson	York City	Macclesfield Town	Free
2 August 2018	(Czech Republic) Jiří Skalák	Brighton & Hove Albion	Millwall	Undisclosed
2 August 2018	Cole Stockton	Carlisle United	Tranmere Rovers	Free
2 August 2018	(Republic of the Congo) Offrande Zanzala	Derby County	Accrington Stanley	Undisclosed
3 August 2018	Chuba Akpom	Arsenal	(Greece) PAOK	Undisclosed
3 August 2018	Morgan Ferrier	Boreham Wood	Walsall	Undisclosed
3 August 2018	(Ivory Coast) Cédric Kipré	(Scotland) Motherwell	Wigan Athletic	£1m
3 August 2018	(Northern Ireland) Matty Lund	Burton Albion	Scunthorpe United	Undisclosed
3 August 2018	Michael Mancienne	Nottingham Forest	(United States) New England Revolution	Free
3 August 2018	Wes McDonald	Birmingham City	Yeovil Town	Free
3 August 2018	(Nigeria) Ahmed Musa	Leicester City	(Saudi Arabia) Al-Nassr	Undisclosed
3 August 2018	Gary O'Neil	Bristol City	Bolton Wanderers	Free
3 August 2018	Dexter Walters	Tamworth	Coventry City	Undisclosed
5 August 2018	Ben Gibson	Middlesbrough	Burnley	£15m
5 August 2018	(Algeria) Rachid Ghezzal	(France) Monaco	Leicester City	Undisclosed
6 August 2018	Adam Armstrong	Newcastle United	Blackburn Rovers	Undisclosed
6 August 2018	Callum Styles	Bury	Barnsley	Undisclosed
7 August 2018	(Sierra Leone) Amadou Bakayoko	Walsall	Coventry City	Undisclosed
7 August 2018	Joe Hart	Manchester City	Burnley	£3.5m
7 August 2018	(Colombia) Jefferson Lerma	(Spain) Levante	AFC Bournemouth	£25m
7 August 2018	(Norway) Ørjan Nyland	(Germany) FC Ingolstadt 04	Aston Villa	Undisclosed
7 August 2018	Moses Odubajo	Hull City	Brentford	Free
7 August 2018	(Northern Ireland) Andrew Scott	(Northern Ireland) Maiden City	Accrington Stanley	Free
7 August 2018	(Czech Republic) Matěj Vydra	Derby County	Burnley	Undisclosed
7 August 2018	Luke Waterfall	Lincoln City	Shrewsbury Town	Undisclosed
8 August 2018	(Spain) Kepa Arrizabalaga	(Spain) Athletic Bilbao	Chelsea	£71m
8 August 2018	(Northern Ireland) Lee Camp	(Wales) Cardiff City	Birmingham City	Free
8 August 2018	A-Jay Leitch-Smith	Shrewsbury Town	Morecambe	Free
8 August 2018	Scott Malone	Huddersfield Town	Derby County	Undisclosed
8 August 2018	(Scotland) John McGinn	(Scotland) Hibernian	Aston Villa	Undisclosed
8 August 2018	Jon Nolan	Shrewsbury Town	Ipswich Town	Undisclosed
8 August 2018	(Democratic Republic of the Congo) Aristote Nsiala	Shrewsbury Town	Ipswich Town	Undisclosed
8 August 2018	(Spain) Adama Traoré	Middlesbrough	Wolverhampton Wanderers	£18m
8 August 2018	Martyn Waghorn	Ipswich Town	Derby County	Undisclosed
8 August 2018	Jordan Williams	Huddersfield Town	Barnsley	Undisclosed
9 August 2018	(Spain) Jordi Amat	(Wales) Swansea City	(Spain) Rayo Vallecano	£1m
9 August 2018	Lee Angol	Mansfield Town	Shrewsbury Town	Undisclosed
9 August 2018	(Australia) Daniel Arzani	(Australia) Melbourne City	Manchester City	Undisclosed
9 August 2018	(Croatia) Filip Benković	(Croatia) Dinamo Zagreb	Leicester City	Undisclosed
9 August 2018	(Brazil) Bernard	(Ukraine) Shakhtar Donetsk	Everton	Free
9 August 2018	Joe Bryan	Bristol City	Fulham	£6m
9 August 2018	Dan Burn	Wigan Athletic	Brighton & Hove Albion	Undisclosed
9 August 2018	(Republic of Ireland) Canice Carroll	Oxford United	Brentford	Undisclosed
9 August 2018	Sam Clucas	(Wales) Swansea City	Stoke City	£6m
9 August 2018	Ryan Colclough	Wigan Athletic	Scunthorpe United	Undisclosed
9 August 2018	(Belgium) Thibaut Courtois	Chelsea	(Spain) Real Madrid	Undisclosed
9 August 2018	(Hong Kong) Tsun Dai	Bury	Oxford United	Undisclosed
9 August 2018	(Montserrat) Donervon Daniels	Wigan Athletic	Blackpool	Free
9 August 2018	(Bosnia and Herzegovina) Milan Đurić	Bristol City	(Italy) Salernitana	Undisclosed
9 August 2018	(Argentina) Federico Fernández	(Wales) Swansea City	Newcastle United	£6m
9 August 2018	Joe Garner	Ipswich Town	Wigan Athletic	Undisclosed
9 August 2018	(Republic of Ireland) Anthony Gerrard	Oldham Athletic	Carlisle United	Free
9 August 2018	Josh Gordon	Leicester City	Walsall	Undisclosed
9 August 2018	(Sweden) Peter Gwargis	(Sweden) Jönköping	Brighton & Hove Albion	Undisclosed
9 August 2018	Jamie Hanson	Derby County	Oxford United	Undisclosed
9 August 2018	(Germany) Michael Hefele	Huddersfield Town	Nottingham Forest	Undisclosed
9 August 2018	(United States) Duane Holmes	Scunthorpe United	Derby County	Undisclosed
9 August 2018	Kayden Jackson	Accrington Stanley	Ipswich Town	Undisclosed
9 August 2018	(Spain) Joan Luque	Heybridge Swifts	Lincoln City	Undisclosed
9 August 2018	Andy Mangan	(Wales) Bala Town	Accrington Stanley	Free
9 August 2018	Jason McCarthy	Barnsley	Wycombe Wanderers	Undisclosed
9 August 2018	(Colombia) Yerry Mina	(Spain) Barcelona	Everton	£27.19m
9 August 2018	(Spain) Martín Montoya	(Spain) Valencia	Brighton & Hove Albion	Undisclosed
9 August 2018	Oliver Norburn	Tranmere Rovers	Shrewsbury Town	Undisclosed
9 August 2018	Isaiah Osbourne	Forest Green Rovers	Walsall	Free
9 August 2018	Stefan Payne	Shrewsbury Town	Bristol Rovers	Undisclosed
9 August 2018	(Spain) Lucas Pérez	Arsenal	West Ham United	Undisclosed
9 August 2018	(Portugal) Domingos Quina	West Ham United	Watford	Undisclosed
9 August 2018	(Colombia) Carlos Sánchez	(Italy) Fiorentina	West Ham United	Undisclosed
9 August 2018	Jason Shackell	Derby County	Lincoln City	Free
9 August 2018	(Turkey) Çağlar Söyüncü	(Germany) SC Freiburg	Leicester City	£19m
9 August 2018	Ivan Toney	Newcastle United	Peterborough United	Undisclosed
9 August 2018	(Jersey) Peter Vincenti	Coventry City	Macclesfield Town	Free
9 August 2018	Josh Windass	(Scotland) Rangers	Wigan Athletic	Undisclosed
9 August 2018	(Cameroon) André-Frank Zambo Anguissa	(France) Marseille	Fulham	£22.3m
10 August 2018	Elliot Hodge	Notts County	Burton Albion	Free
11 August 2018	(Republic of Ireland) Daryl Horgan	Preston North End	(Scotland) Hibernian	Undisclosed
12 August 2018	(Argentina) Leonardo Ulloa	Leicester City	(Mexico) Pachuca	Undisclosed
17 August 2018	(Costa Rica) Joel Campbell	Arsenal	(Italy) Frosinone	Undisclosed
17 August 2018	(Estonia) Ragnar Klavan	Liverpool	(Italy) Cagliari	£2m
17 August 2018	Adam Le Fondre	Bolton Wanderers	(Australia) Sydney FC	Free
21 August 2018	Josh Dasilva	Arsenal	Brentford	Compensation
21 August 2018	Matt Mills	Barnsley	(India) Pune City	Free
24 August 2018	(Scotland) Darren Lyon	(Scotland) Hamilton Academical	Peterborough United	Free
30 August 2018	(Belgium) Nacer Chadli	West Bromwich Albion	(France) Monaco	£10m
31 August 2018	(Republic of Ireland) Jack Byrne	Oldham Athletic	(Scotland) Kilmarnock	Free
31 August 2018	(Cameroon) Eric Maxim Choupo-Moting	Stoke City	(France) Paris Saint-Germain	Free
31 August 2018	Cameron Jerome	Derby County	(Turkey) Göztepe	Undisclosed
31 August 2018	Matthew Kilgallon	Bradford City	(Scotland) Hamilton Academical	Free
31 August 2018	(Northern Ireland) Conor Washington	Queens Park Rangers	Sheffield United	Free

=== Loans ===
Date	Name	Moving from	Moving to
20 February 2018	Joe Mason	Wolverhampton Wanderers	(United States) Colorado Rapids
27 March 2018	Andrew Eleftheriou	Watford	(Norway) Sandefjord
29 March 2018	(Sweden) Gustav Engvall	Bristol City	(Sweden) IFK Göteborg
27 May 2018	(Austria) Kevin Wimmer	Stoke City	(Germany) Hannover 96
7 June 2018	Ovie Ejaria	Liverpool	(Scotland) Rangers
7 June 2018	(Wales) Aaron Collins	Wolverhampton Wanderers	Colchester United
12 June 2018	(Mexico) Raúl Jiménez	(Portugal) Benfica	Wolverhampton Wanderers
12 June 2018	(Democratic Republic of the Congo) Benik Afobe	Wolverhampton Wanderers	Stoke City
13 June 2018	Joe Dodoo	(Scotland) Rangers	Blackpool
14 June 2018	(Portugal) Diogo Gonçalves	(Portugal) Benfica	Nottingham Forest
15 June 2018	(Spain) Robert Sánchez	Brighton & Hove Albion	Forest Green Rovers
16 June 2018	Harry Burgoyne	Wolverhampton Wanderers	Plymouth Argyle
18 June 2018	(Northern Ireland) Ben Hall	Brighton & Hove Albion	Notts County
18 June 2018	Dean Henderson	Manchester United	Sheffield United
18 June 2018	(Scotland) Jason Holt	(Scotland) Rangers	Fleetwood Town
20 June 2018	Diallang Jaiyesimi	Norwich City	Yeovil Town
21 June 2018	(Republic of Ireland) Samir Carruthers	Sheffield United	Oxford United
21 June 2018	Louis Dodds	Chesterfield	Port Vale
22 June 2018	Charlie Cooper	Forest Green Rovers	(Wales) Newport County
22 June 2018	(Netherlands) Sherwin Seedorf	Wolverhampton Wanderers	Bradford City
22 June 2018	Christian Walton	Brighton & Hove Albion	Wigan Athletic
23 June 2018	(Portugal) Gil Dias	(France) Monaco	Nottingham Forest
24 June 2018	Mason Bloomfield	Norwich City	(Scotland) Hamilton Academical
25 June 2018	Joe Bunney	Northampton Town	Blackpool
25 June 2018	Trevoh Chalobah	Chelsea	Ipswich Town
26 June 2018	Nathan Baxter	Chelsea	Yeovil Town
27 June 2018	Lewie Coyle	Leeds United	Fleetwood Town
27 June 2018	Reece James	Chelsea	Wigan Athletic
27 June 2018	Tommy Spurr	Preston North End	Fleetwood Town
27 June 2018	Tom King	Millwall	AFC Wimbledon
27 June 2018	Dujon Sterling	Chelsea	Coventry City
28 June 2018	Joe Fryer	Middlesbrough	Carlisle United
28 June 2018	Idris Kanu	Peterborough United	Port Vale
28 June 2018	(Germany) Marcel Franke	Norwich City	(Germany) SV Darmstadt 98
28 June 2018	(Mali) Cheick Keita	Birmingham City	(Belgium) Eupen
29 June 2018	(Republic of Ireland) Fiacre Kelleher	Oxford United	Macclesfield Town
29 June 2018	Tyler Walker	Nottingham Forest	Mansfield Town
30 June 2018	Lewis Baker	Chelsea	Leeds United
1 July 2018	Dan Turner	Port Vale	(Scotland) Falkirk
2 July 2018	(Scotland) Adam King	(Wales) Swansea City	Peterborough United
2 July 2018	Zak Vyner	Bristol City	Rotherham United
2 July 2018	Steven Alzate	Brighton & Hove Albion	Swindon Town
2 July 2018	(Scotland) Theo Archibald	Brentford	Forest Green Rovers
2 July 2018	Luke Garbutt	Everton	Oxford United
2 July 2018	Jake Clarke-Salter	Chelsea	(Netherlands) Vitesse
2 July 2018	(Germany) Felix Passlack	(Germany) Borussia Dortmund	Norwich City
3 July 2018	Tristan Abrahams	Norwich City	Exeter City
3 July 2018	Ben Heneghan	Sheffield United	Blackpool
3 July 2018	Nathan Thomas	Sheffield United	Notts County
3 July 2018	(Sweden) Paweł Cibicki	Leeds United	(Norway) Molde
3 July 2018	(Hungary) Ádám Bogdán	Liverpool	(Scotland) Hibernian
5 July 2018	Scott Quigley	Blackpool	Port Vale
5 July 2018	(Netherlands) Jay-Roy Grot	Leeds United	(Netherlands) VVV-Venlo
6 July 2018	Tyler Denton	Leeds United	Peterborough United
6 July 2018	Mathew Hudson	Preston North End	Bury
6 July 2018	(Republic of Ireland) Paudie O'Connor	Leeds United	Blackpool
6 July 2018	Akin Famewo	Luton Town	Grimsby Town
6 July 2018	Sam Graham	Sheffield United	Oldham Athletic
6 July 2018	Jorge Grant	Nottingham Forest	Luton Town
6 July 2018	Stephen Humphrys	Fulham	Scunthorpe United
6 July 2018	(Scotland) Steven Naismith	Norwich City	(Scotland) Hearts
7 July 2018	Rob Lainton	Port Vale	(Wales) Wrexham
8 July 2018	(Argentina) Guido Carrillo	Southampton	(Spain) Leganés
9 July 2018	Hayden Coulson	Middlesbrough	(Scotland) St Mirren
9 July 2018	(Netherlands) Danzell Gravenberch	Reading	(Belgium) Roeselare
10 July 2018	(Scotland) Jordan Rhodes	Sheffield Wednesday	Norwich City
10 July 2018	Tennai Watson	Reading	AFC Wimbledon
10 July 2018	Jonny Smith	Bristol City	Tranmere Rovers
11 July 2018	Mallik Wilks	Leeds United	Doncaster Rovers
12 July 2018	(Brazil) Kenedy	Chelsea	Newcastle United
12 July 2018	Liam Mandeville	Doncaster Rovers	Morecambe
12 July 2018	(Portugal) Roderick Miranda	Wolverhampton Wanderers	(Greece) Olympiacos
13 July 2018	Ben Amos	Bolton Wanderers	Millwall
13 July 2018	(Scotland) Jason Cummings	Nottingham Forest	Peterborough United
13 July 2018	Harvey Gilmour	Sheffield United	Tranmere Rovers
16 July 2018	Jamal Blackman	Chelsea	Leeds United
16 July 2018	George Miller	Middlesbrough	Bradford City
16 July 2018	Jack Payne	Huddersfield Town	Bradford City
17 July 2018	Todd Kane	Chelsea	Hull City
17 July 2018	Mason Mount	Chelsea	Derby County
17 July 2018	(Wales) Harry Wilson	Liverpool	Derby County
18 July 2018	Dominic Ball	Rotherham United	(Scotland) Aberdeen
19 July 2018	(Netherlands) Yanic Wildschut	Norwich City	Bolton Wanderers
20 July 2018	Dior Angus	Port Vale	Nuneaton Town
20 July 2018	Mike Calveley	Port Vale	Nuneaton Town
20 July 2018	Jack Colback	Newcastle United	Nottingham Forest
20 July 2018	(Wales) Ched Evans	Sheffield United	Fleetwood Town
20 July 2018	Regan Slater	Sheffield United	Carlisle United
20 July 2018	Jerry Yates	Rotherham United	Carlisle United
21 July 2018	Charlie Colkett	Chelsea	Shrewsbury Town
22 July 2018	Ryan Kent	Liverpool	(Scotland) Rangers
22 July 2018	Scott Wharton	Blackburn Rovers	Lincoln City
23 July 2018	(Spain) Rafa Mir	Wolverhampton Wanderers	(Spain) Las Palmas
24 July 2018	Harvey Barnes	Leicester City	West Bromwich Albion
24 July 2018	Marcus Browne	West Ham United	Oxford United
24 July 2018	Shamal George	Liverpool	Tranmere Rovers
24 July 2018	(Northern Ireland) Shay McCartan	Bradford City	Lincoln City
25 July 2018	(Spain) Jonny	(Spain) Atlético Madrid	Wolverhampton Wanderers
25 July 2018	(Germany) André Schürrle	(Germany) Borussia Dortmund	Fulham
25 July 2018	Jerome Sinclair	Watford	Sunderland
25 July 2018	Sean Raggett	Norwich City	Rotherham United
25 July 2018	(Slovakia) Marek Rodák	Fulham	Rotherham United
25 July 2018	(Republic of Ireland) Tommie Hoban	Watford	(Scotland) Aberdeen
25 July 2018	(Netherlands) Jordy Clasie	Southampton	(Netherlands) Feyenoord
25 July 2018	(Netherlands) Joey van den Berg	Reading	(Netherlands) NEC Nijmegen
25 July 2018	(Croatia) Mario Pašalić	Chelsea	(Italy) Atalanta
26 July 2018	(Denmark) Daniel Iversen	Leicester City	Oldham Athletic
26 July 2018	Jacob Maddox	Chelsea	Cheltenham Town
26 July 2018	(Northern Ireland) Conor Mitchell	Burnley	(Scotland) St Johnstone
27 July 2018	Reece Cole	Brentford	Yeovil Town
27 July 2018	Joel Coleman	Huddersfield Town	Shrewsbury Town
27 July 2018	Lewis Ward	Reading	Northampton Town
27 July 2018	Randell Williams	Watford	Wycombe Wanderers
27 July 2018	Matty Willock	Manchester United	(Scotland) St Mirren
28 July 2018	Cameron Borthwick-Jackson	Manchester United	Scunthorpe United
29 July 2018	Brendon Daniels	Port Vale	Altrincham
30 July 2018	Tyreeq Bakinson	Bristol City	(Wales) Newport County
30 July 2018	Jack Harrison	Manchester City	Leeds United
30 July 2018	Matt Macey	Arsenal	Plymouth Argyle
30 July 2018	Callum Maycock	Coventry City	Macclesfield Town
30 July 2018	Kasey Palmer	Chelsea	Blackburn Rovers
30 July 2018	Sam Surridge	AFC Bournemouth	Oldham Athletic
31 July 2018	(Saint Lucia) Janoi Donacien	Accrington Stanley	Ipswich Town
31 July 2018	(Mali) Hadi Sacko	Leeds United	(Spain) Las Palmas
31 July 2018	Sam Smith	Reading	Oxford United
1 August 2018	(Ivory Coast) Lamine Koné	Sunderland	(France) Strasbourg
1 August 2018	(Portugal) André Moreira	(Spain) Atlético Madrid	Aston Villa
1 August 2018	Ben Purrington	Rotherham United	AFC Wimbledon
1 August 2018	(Wales) Ben Woodburn	Liverpool	Sheffield United
2 August 2018	Adam Crookes	Nottingham Forest	Lincoln City
2 August 2018	Tyler Garratt	Doncaster Rovers	AFC Wimbledon
2 August 2018	Herbie Kane	Liverpool	Doncaster Rovers
2 August 2018	Sid Nelson	Millwall	Swindon Town
2 August 2018	(Portugal) Joel Pereira	Manchester United	(Portugal) Vitória de Setúbal
2 August 2018	(Wales) Ashley Williams	Everton	Stoke City
3 August 2018	Tosin Adarabioyo	Manchester City	West Bromwich Albion
3 August 2018	Aden Baldwin	Bristol City	Cheltenham Town
3 August 2018	Adam Campbell	Morecambe	Carlisle United
3 August 2018	(Switzerland) Seny Dieng	Queens Park Rangers	Stevenage
3 August 2018	Tayo Edun	Fulham	Ipswich Town
3 August 2018	Jack Fitzwater	West Bromwich Albion	Walsall
3 August 2018	Malachi Napa	Oxford United	Macclesfield Town
3 August 2018	Alex Pattison	Middlesbrough	Yeovil Town
3 August 2018	Matthew Platt	Blackburn Rovers	Accrington Stanley
3 August 2018	(United States) Antonee Robinson	Everton	Wigan Athletic
3 August 2018	(Republic of Ireland) Ryan Sweeney	Stoke City	Mansfield Town
3 August 2018	(Wales) George Thomas	Leicester City	Scunthorpe United
3 August 2018	Kane Wilson	West Bromwich Albion	Walsall
6 August 2018	Dwight Gayle	Newcastle United	West Bromwich Albion
6 August 2018	(Belgium) Dodi Lukebakio	Watford	(Germany) Fortuna Düsseldorf
6 August 2018	(Venezuela) Salomón Rondón	West Bromwich Albion	Newcastle United
6 August 2018	Callum Styles	Barnsley	Bury
6 August 2018	Fikayo Tomori	Chelsea	Derby County
6 August 2018	Axel Tuanzebe	Manchester United	Aston Villa
7 August 2018	Brandon Barker	Manchester City	Preston North End
7 August 2018	Omar Bogle	(Wales) Cardiff City	Birmingham City
7 August 2018	Calum Chambers	Arsenal	Fulham
7 August 2018	Connor Mahoney	AFC Bournemouth	Birmingham City
7 August 2018	Bryn Morris	Shrewsbury Town	Wycombe Wanderers
7 August 2018	(Republic of Ireland) Dara O'Shea	West Bromwich Albion	Exeter City
7 August 2018	David Wheeler	Queens Park Rangers	Portsmouth
8 August 2018	(Ghana) Thomas Agyepong	Manchester City	(Scotland) Hibernian
8 August 2018	(Austria) Daniel Bachmann	Watford	(Scotland) Kilmarnock
8 August 2018	(Scotland) Greg Docherty	(Scotland) Rangers	Shrewsbury Town
8 August 2018	Jordan Hugill	West Ham United	Middlesbrough
8 August 2018	(United States) Emerson Hyndman	AFC Bournemouth	(Scotland) Hibernian
8 August 2018	(Australia) Brad Smith	AFC Bournemouth	(United States) Seattle Sounders
9 August 2018	(Scotland) Tom Aldred	Bury	(Scotland) Motherwell
9 August 2018	(Republic of Ireland) Harry Arter	AFC Bournemouth	(Wales) Cardiff City
9 August 2018	(Ghana) Jordan Ayew	(Wales) Swansea City	Crystal Palace
9 August 2018	(Denmark) Nicolai Brock-Madsen	Birmingham City	(Scotland) St Mirren
9 August 2018	Dan Burn	Brighton & Hove Albion	Wigan Athletic
9 August 2018	(Spain) Víctor Camarasa	(Spain) Real Betis	(Wales) Cardiff City
9 August 2018	Callum Connolly	Everton	Wigan Athletic
9 August 2018	Jay Dasilva	Chelsea	Bristol City
9 August 2018	(Belgium) Leander Dendoncker	(Belgium) Anderlecht	Wolverhampton Wanderers
9 August 2018	Jordan Flores	Wigan Athletic	(Sweden) Östersund
9 August 2018	(Netherlands) Timothy Fosu-Mensah	Manchester United	Fulham
9 August 2018	Gary Gardner	Aston Villa	Birmingham City
9 August 2018	(Portugal) André Gomes	(Spain) Barcelona	Everton
9 August 2018	Ricky Holmes	Sheffield United	Oxford United
9 August 2018	Danny Ings	Liverpool	Southampton
9 August 2018	(Scotland) Alex Jakubiak	Watford	Bristol Rovers
9 August 2018	(Croatia) Mateo Kovačić	(Spain) Real Madrid	Chelsea
9 August 2018	(Belgium) Isaac Mbenza	(France) Montpellier	Huddersfield Town
9 August 2018	Lukas Nmecha	Manchester City	Preston North End
9 August 2018	(Spain) Sergio Rico	(Spain) Sevilla	Fulham
9 August 2018	Connor Ripley	Middlesbrough	Accrington Stanley
9 August 2018	(Argentina) Luciano Vietto	(Spain) Atlético Madrid	Fulham
10 August 2018	(Belgium) Michy Batshuayi	Chelsea	(Spain) Valencia
10 August 2018	Sam Byram	West Ham United	Nottingham Forest
10 August 2018	(Wales) Lee Evans	Sheffield United	Wigan Athletic
10 August 2018	Shawn McCoulsky	Bristol City	Southend United
10 August 2018	Max Power	Wigan Athletic	Sunderland
10 August 2018	Jed Steer	Aston Villa	Charlton Athletic
10 August 2018	(France) Kurt Zouma	Chelsea	Everton
12 August 2018	Remi Matthews	Norwich City	Bolton Wanderers
12 August 2018	(Algeria) Islam Slimani	Leicester City	(Turkey) Fenerbahçe
13 August 2018	Jonathan Grounds	Birmingham City	Bolton Wanderers
13 August 2018	Jonathan Mitchell	Derby County	Oxford United
13 August 2018	(Northern Ireland) Oliver Norwood	Brighton & Hove Albion	Sheffield United
13 August 2018	James Wilson	Manchester United	(Scotland) Aberdeen
14 August 2018	(France) Tiémoué Bakayoko	Chelsea	(Italy) Milan
14 August 2018	Callum Lang	Wigan Athletic	Oldham Athletic
15 August 2018	(Scotland) Jamie Barjonas	(Scotland) Rangers	Bury
15 August 2018	Nick Blackman	Derby County	(Spain) Sporting Gijón
15 August 2018	Magnus Norman	Fulham	Rochdale
15 August 2018	(Republic of Ireland) Kieran O'Hara	Manchester United	Macclesfield Town
15 August 2018	(Australia) Aiden O'Neill	Burnley	(Australia) Central Coast Mariners
16 August 2018	(Poland) Krystian Bielik	Arsenal	Charlton Athletic
16 August 2018	(Wales) Mitchell Clark	Aston Villa	Port Vale
16 August 2018	(Republic of Ireland) Ryan Manning	Queens Park Rangers	Rotherham United
16 August 2018	(Senegal) Cheikh N'Doye	Birmingham City	(France) Angers
16 August 2018	Patrick Roberts	Manchester City	(Spain) Girona
16 August 2018	Luke Thomas	Derby County	Coventry City
17 August 2018	Nick Anderton	Blackpool	Accrington Stanley
17 August 2018	(Australia) Daniel Arzani	Manchester City	(Scotland) Celtic
17 August 2018	(Curaçao) Cuco Martina	Everton	Stoke City
17 August 2018	Dylan Mottley-Henry	Barnsley	Tranmere Rovers
17 August 2018	Ashley Nadesan	Fleetwood Town	Carlisle United
17 August 2018	(Cameroon) Allan Nyom	West Bromwich Albion	(Spain) Leganés
17 August 2018	(Colombia) David Ospina	Arsenal	(Italy) Napoli
17 August 2018	Ben Thompson	Millwall	Portsmouth
18 August 2018	Luke Hendrie	Shrewsbury Town	Grimsby Town
20 August 2018	James Husband	Norwich City	Fleetwood Town
20 August 2018	(Northern Ireland) Luke McCullough	Doncaster Rovers	Tranmere Rovers
20 August 2018	Josh Sims	Southampton	Reading
21 August 2018	(Belgium) Laurens De Bock	Leeds United	(Belgium) Ostend
21 August 2018	(Japan) Yōsuke Ideguchi	Leeds United	(Germany) Greuther Fürth
21 August 2018	Sam Slocombe	Bristol Rovers	Lincoln City
22 August 2018	(Italy) Franklyn Akammadu	(Italy) Alessandria	Tranmere Rovers
22 August 2018	(Netherlands) Anwar El Ghazi	(France) Lille	Aston Villa
23 August 2018	Harry Benns	Port Vale	Stafford Rangers
23 August 2018	(Bosnia and Herzegovina) Muhamed Bešić	Everton	Middlesbrough
23 August 2018	(Wales) Tom Bradshaw	Barnsley	Millwall
23 August 2018	(Israel) Tomer Hemed	Brighton & Hove Albion	Queens Park Rangers
23 August 2018	(Czech Republic) Tomáš Kalas	Chelsea	Bristol City
23 August 2018	Connor Randall	Liverpool	Rochdale
23 August 2018	(Bermuda) Nahki Wells	Burnley	Queens Park Rangers
23 August 2018	Joe Williams	Everton	Bolton Wanderers
24 August 2018	Jermaine Anderson	Peterborough United	Doncaster Rovers
24 August 2018	Rhys Healey	(Wales) Cardiff City	Milton Keynes Dons
24 August 2018	Michael Ihiekwe	Rotherham United	Accrington Stanley
24 August 2018	(Wales) Sam Jones	Shrewsbury Town	Cheltenham Town
24 August 2018	Stuart O'Keefe	(Wales) Cardiff City	Plymouth Argyle
24 August 2018	Cauley Woodrow	Fulham	Barnsley
25 August 2018	(Democratic Republic of the Congo) Yannick Bolasie	Everton	Aston Villa
25 August 2018	Ryan Woods	Brentford	Stoke City
27 August 2018	(Republic of Ireland) Jack Bonham	Brentford	Bristol Rovers
27 August 2018	Harrison Reed	Southampton	Blackburn Rovers
28 August 2018	Ben Brereton	Nottingham Forest	Blackburn Rovers
28 August 2018	Harry Bunn	Bury	Southend United
28 August 2018	Kellan Gordon	Derby County	Lincoln City
28 August 2018	Jordan Graham	Wolverhampton Wanderers	Ipswich Town
28 August 2018	Demetri Mitchell	Manchester United	(Scotland) Hearts
28 August 2018	(Senegal) Badou Ndiaye	Stoke City	(Turkey) Galatasaray
28 August 2018	Tristan Nydam	Ipswich Town	(Scotland) St Johnstone
28 August 2018	Omari Patrick	Bradford City	Yeovil Town
28 August 2018	(Scotland) Greg Stewart	Birmingham City	(Scotland) Kilmarnock
29 August 2018	(Ghana) Caleb Ekuban	Leeds United	(Turkey) Trabzonspor
29 August 2018	Andre Green	Aston Villa	Portsmouth
29 August 2018	Joe Martin	Stevenage	Bristol Rovers
29 August 2018	Nathan McGinley	Middlesbrough	Forest Green Rovers
29 August 2018	(Belgium) Julien Ngoy	Stoke City	(Switzerland) Grasshoppers
29 August 2018	(Republic of Ireland) Kevin O'Connor	Preston North End	Crewe Alexandra
29 August 2018	(Democratic Republic of the Congo) Aaron Tshibola	Aston Villa	(Scotland) Kilmarnock
30 August 2018	Jak Alnwick	(Scotland) Rangers	Scunthorpe United
30 August 2018	Tyrone Barnett	Port Vale	Cheltenham Town
30 August 2018	Izzy Brown	Chelsea	Leeds United
30 August 2018	Conor Chaplin	Portsmouth	Coventry City
30 August 2018	Devante Cole	Wigan Athletic	Burton Albion
30 August 2018	(Republic of Ireland) Josh Cullen	West Ham United	Charlton Athletic
30 August 2018	Elliot Embleton	Sunderland	Grimsby Town
30 August 2018	Jake Flannigan	Southampton	Burton Albion
30 August 2018	Charlie Fox	Queens Park Rangers	Wycombe Wanderers
30 August 2018	Lewis Hardcastle	Blackburn Rovers	Port Vale
30 August 2018	Sam Hart	Blackburn Rovers	Rochdale
30 August 2018	Jake Hesketh	Southampton	Burton Albion
30 August 2018	(France) Giannelli Imbula	Stoke City	(Spain) Rayo Vallecano
30 August 2018	(Luxembourg) Enes Mahmutovic	Middlesbrough	Yeovil Town
30 August 2018	Sam McQueen	Southampton	Middlesbrough
30 August 2018	(Nigeria) Fred Onyedinma	Millwall	Wycombe Wanderers
30 August 2018	(Spain) Sandro Ramírez	Everton	(Spain) Real Sociedad
30 August 2018	Steve Seddon	Birmingham City	Stevenage
30 August 2018	Ike Ugbo	Chelsea	Scunthorpe United
30 August 2018	(Republic of Ireland) Jonathan Walters	Burnley	Ipswich Town
31 August 2018	Tammy Abraham	Chelsea	Aston Villa
31 August 2018	(Netherlands) Vurnon Anita	Leeds United	(Netherlands) Willem II
31 August 2018	(Germany) Mike-Steven Bähre	(Germany) Hannover 96	Barnsley
31 August 2018	Daniel Barlaser	Newcastle United	Accrington Stanley
31 August 2018	Danny Batth	Wolverhampton Wanderers	Middlesbrough
31 August 2018	(Croatia) Filip Benković	Leicester City	(Scotland) Celtic
31 August 2018	(Republic of Ireland) Andy Boyle	Preston North End	(Scotland) Dundee
31 August 2018	(United States) Geoff Cameron	Stoke City	Queens Park Rangers
31 August 2018	Mitchel Candlin	Walsall	Blackburn Rovers
31 August 2018	Luke Charman	Newcastle United	Accrington Stanley
31 August 2018	Zach Clough	Nottingham Forest	Rochdale
31 August 2018	Bradley Collins	Chelsea	Burton Albion
31 August 2018	(Wales) Keston Davies	(Wales) Swansea City	Notts County
31 August 2018	(Wales) Christian Doidge	Forest Green Rovers	Bolton Wanderers
31 August 2018	Tommy Elphick	Aston Villa	Hull City
31 August 2018	(Slovenia) Timi Elšnik	Derby County	Mansfield Town
31 August 2018	Josh Emmanuel	Ipswich Town	Shrewsbury Town
31 August 2018	(Nigeria) Bright Enobakhare	Wolverhampton Wanderers	(Scotland) Kilmarnock
31 August 2018	(Republic of Ireland) Tom Field	Brentford	Cheltenham Town
31 August 2018	(Malta) Luke Gambin	Luton Town	Crawley Town
31 August 2018	Callum Guy	Derby County	Blackpool
31 August 2018	Connor Hall	Bolton Wanderers	Accrington Stanley
31 August 2018	(Jamaica) Michael Hector	Chelsea	Sheffield Wednesday
31 August 2018	Ryan Inniss	Crystal Palace	(Scotland) Dundee
31 August 2018	(Switzerland) Saidy Janko	(Portugal) Porto	Nottingham Forest
31 August 2018	Jake Jervis	Luton Town	AFC Wimbledon
31 August 2018	Connor Johnson	Wolverhampton Wanderers	Walsall
31 August 2018	Marvin Johnson	Middlesbrough	Sheffield United
31 August 2018	(Poland) Bartosz Kapustka	Leicester City	(Belgium) OH Leuven
31 August 2018	(Northern Ireland) Caolan Lavery	Sheffield United	Bury
31 August 2018	Ryan Leonard	Sheffield United	Millwall
31 August 2018	(Australia) Jordan Lyden	Aston Villa	Oldham Athletic
31 August 2018	Joe Maguire	Fleetwood Town	Crawley Town
31 August 2018	(Scotland) Chris Martin	Derby County	Hull City
31 August 2018	(Republic of Ireland) Joe Mason	Wolverhampton Wanderers	Portsmouth
31 August 2018	(Ghana) Bernard Mensah	Bristol Rovers	Lincoln City
31 August 2018	Robert Milsom	Crawley Town	Notts County
31 August 2018	Kelsey Mooney	Aston Villa	Cheltenham Town
31 August 2018	Taylor Moore	Bristol City	Southend United
31 August 2018	Ben Morris	Ipswich Town	Forest Green Rovers
31 August 2018	Reiss Nelson	Arsenal	(Germany) 1899 Hoffenheim
31 August 2018	Lewis O'Brien	Huddersfield Town	Bradford City
31 August 2018	(Republic of Ireland) Eunan O'Kane	Leeds United	Luton Town
31 August 2018	(Republic of Ireland) Chiedozie Ogbene	Brentford	Exeter City
31 August 2018	Connor Ogilvie	Tottenham Hotspur	Gillingham
31 August 2018	Olufela Olomola	Scunthorpe United	Yeovil Town
31 August 2018	Josh Onomah	Tottenham Hotspur	Sheffield Wednesday
31 August 2018	Matthew Pennington	Everton	Ipswich Town
31 August 2018	Joe Piggott	Wigan Athletic	Morecambe
31 August 2018	Jordan Ponticelli	Coventry City	Macclesfield Town
31 August 2018	Cameron Pring	Bristol City	(Wales) Newport County
31 August 2018	Ben Pringle	Preston North End	Grimsby Town
31 August 2018	(Republic of Ireland) Connor Ronan	Wolverhampton Wanderers	Walsall
31 August 2018	(Northern Ireland) George Saville	Millwall	Middlesbrough
31 August 2018	Jack Sowerby	Fleetwood Town	Carlisle United
31 August 2018	(Republic of Ireland) Richie Towell	Brighton & Hove Albion	Rotherham United
31 August 2018	(Greece) Apostolos Vellios	Nottingham Forest	(Belgium) Waasland-Beveren
31 August 2018	(Belgium) Marnick Vermijl	Preston North End	(Netherlands) MVV Maastricht
31 August 2018	(Scotland) Jamie Walker	Wigan Athletic	Peterborough United
31 August 2018	(Northern Ireland) Jamie Ward	Nottingham Forest	Charlton Athletic
31 August 2018	(Republic of Ireland) Corey Whelan	Liverpool	Crewe Alexandra
31 August 2018	Luke Woolfenden	Ipswich Town	Swindon Town
31 August 2018	Joe Worrall	Nottingham Forest	(Scotland) Rangers
31 August 2018	Matt Worthington	AFC Bournemouth	Forest Green Rovers

=== Unattached players ===
Date	Name	New club
6 February 2018	(Belgium) Jonathan Benteke	Oldham Athletic
7 February 2018	(France) Patrice Evra	West Ham United
8 February 2018	(Greece) Stefanos Kapino	Nottingham Forest
8 February 2018	(Spain) Juan Fuentes	Nottingham Forest
20 February 2018	Stuart Nelson	Yeovil Town
22 February 2018	(Germany) Jan Kirchhoff	Bolton Wanderers
3 March 2018	(Nigeria) Chinedu Obasi	Bolton Wanderers
8 March 2018	(Netherlands) Kevin Luckassen	Northampton Town
10 March 2018	(Guyana) Matthew Briggs	Barnet
13 March 2018	(Scotland) Paul Paton	Plymouth Argyle
15 March 2018	Gary McSheffrey	Grimsby Town
16 March 2018	(Czech Republic) Tomáš Egert	Burton Albion
22 March 2018	Lloyd Sam	AFC Wimbledon
22 March 2018	Nigel Reo-Coker	Milton Keynes Dons
30 June 2018	James Sinclair	Morecambe
13 July 2018	(Republic of the Congo) Christopher Missilou	Oldham Athletic
13 July 2018	(Switzerland) Gold Omotayo	Bury
14 July 2018	Curtis Thompson	Wycombe Wanderers
16 July 2018	(Republic of Ireland) Reece Grego-Cox	Crawley Town
16 July 2018	James Pearson	Macclesfield Town
16 July 2018	Giles Coke	Oldham Athletic
17 July 2018	Darren Pratley	Charlton Athletic
18 July 2018	(France) Armand Gnanduillet	Blackpool
18 July 2018	(Ivory Coast) Zoumana Bakayogo	Tranmere Rovers
18 July 2018	Ben Nugent	Stevenage
19 July 2018	Andy Taylor	Oldham Athletic
20 July 2018	Michael Rose	Macclesfield Town
27 July 2018	(Belgium) Jonathan Benteke	Oldham Athletic
31 July 2018	(Wales) Boaz Myhill	West Bromwich Albion
1 August 2018	Baily Cargill	Milton Keynes Dons
1 August 2018	James Perch	Scunthorpe United
2 August 2018	(Martinique) Yoann Arquin	Yeovil Town
2 August 2018	(Scotland) Callum McFadzean	Bury
2 August 2018	Ishmael Miller	Oldham Athletic
2 August 2018	Paul Taylor	Doncaster Rovers
3 August 2018	(Republic of Ireland) Darron Gibson	Wigan Athletic
3 August 2018	(France) Kalvin Lumbombo Kalala	Cheltenham Town
13 August 2018	Rob Milsom	Crawley Town
15 August 2018	(Spain) Àngel Rangel	Queens Park Rangers
17 August 2018	(Turkey) Jem Karacan	Millwall
17 August 2018	Wes Thomas	Grimsby Town
22 August 2018	(Republic of Ireland) Stephen Quinn	Burton Albion
23 August 2018	Liam Feeney	Blackpool
23 August 2018	Jack Rodwell	Blackburn Rovers
23 August 2018	(Wales) Alex Samuel	Wycombe Wanderers
27 August 2018	Chris Clements	Cheltenham Town
28 August 2018	Tyrone Mears	West Bromwich Albion
30 August 2018	Ben Whitfield	Port Vale
31 August 2018	Bondz N'Gala	Crawley Town
31 August 2018	Luke O'Reilly	Carlisle United

=== Notes ===
^{a} Player officially joined his club on 8 June 2018.
^{b} Player officially joined his club on 1 July 2018.
^{c} Player officially joined his club on 1 August 2018.
