= 2018–19 Oldham Athletic A.F.C. season =

Oldham Athletic
2018–19 season
- Chairman: Abdallah Lemsagam
- Head Coach: Frankie Bunn (until 27 December); Paul Scholes (from 11 February – 14 March); Pete Wild (from 22 March)
- Stadium: Boundary Park
- League Two: 14th
- FA Cup: Fourth round (vs. Doncaster Rovers)
- EFL Cup: First round (vs. Derby County)
- EFL Trophy: Second round (vs. Rochdale)
Home colours	Away colours

The 2018–19 season was Oldham Athletic's 124th season in their history and first season back in the fourth tier since the 1970–71 season following relegation the previous season. Along with competing in League Two, the club also participated in the FA Cup, EFL Cup and EFL Trophy.

The season covers the period from 1 July 2018 to 30 June 2019.

== Transfers ==
=== Transfers in ===
Date from	Position	Nationality	Name	From	Fee	Ref.
1 July 2018	AM	(England)	Jose Baxter	Everton	Free transfer	
3 July 2018	MF	(Gabon)	Johan Branger	(France) FC Dieppe	Free transfer	
13 July 2018	DM	(Republic of the Congo)	Christopher Missilou	(France) Le Puy Foot 43	Free transfer	
16 July 2018	CM	(England)	Giles Coke	Chesterfield	Free transfer	
19 July 2018	LB	(England)	Andy Taylor	Blackpool	Free transfer	
30 July 2018	CF	(England)	Chris O'Grady	Chesterfield	Free transfer	
2 August 2018	CF	(England)	Ishmael Miller	Free agent	Free transfer	
5 January 2019	DM	(France)	Mohamed Sylla	(France) L'Entente	Free transfer	
18 January 2019	CB	(France)	Sonhy Sefil	(France) Lyon-Duchère	Free transfer	
18 January 2019	CF	(Spain)	Urko Vera	(Romania) CFR Cluj	Free transfer	

=== Transfers out ===
Date from	Position	Nationality	Name	To	Fee	Ref.
1 July 2018	AM	(England)	Ollie Banks	Tranmere Rovers	Released	
1 July 2018	CF	(Wales)	Craig Davies	Mansfield Town	Undisclosed	
1 July 2018	CM	(England)	Mason Fawns	Curzon Ashton	Released	
1 July 2018	CM	(Republic of Ireland)	Paul Green	Crewe Alexandra	Released	
1 July 2018	RW	(Belgium)	Gyamfi Kyeremeh	(Belgium) Gent	Mutual consent	
1 July 2018	RB	(England)	Kallum Mantack	Stockport County	Released	
1 July 2018	LB	(France)	Wilfried Moimbé	(France) AS Nancy	Released	
1 July 2018	LW	(England)	Tope Obadeyi	(France) Sochaux	Released	
1 July 2018	AM	(Algeria)	Abdelhakim Omrani	(Belgium) Virton	Released	
1 July 2018	RB	(England)	Brian Wilson	Barrow	Released	
2 July 2018	AM	(Northern Ireland)	Patrick McEleney	(Republic of Ireland) Dundalk	Undisclosed	
13 July 2018	CF	(Wales)	Aaron Amadi-Holloway	Shrewsbury Town	Undisclosed	
17 July 2018	RB	(Northern Ireland)	Ryan McLaughlin	Blackpool	Compensation	
3 August 2018	GK	(Haiti)	Johny Placide	Free agent	Mutual consent	
9 August 2018	CB	(Republic of Ireland)	Anthony Gerrard	Carlisle United	Free transfer	
31 August 2018	CM	(Republic of Ireland)	Jack Byrne	(Scotland) Kilmarnock	Mutual consent	
3 January 2019	CF	(England)	Ishmael Miller	Tranmere Rovers	Released	
31 January 2019	CF	(England)	Courtney Duffus	Yeovil Town	Undisclosed	
15 February 2019	RB	(Northern Ireland)	Cameron Dummigan	(Republic of Ireland) Dundalk	Free transfer	

=== Loans in ===
Start date	Position	Nationality	Name	From	End date	Ref.
6 July 2018	CB	(England)	Sam Graham	Sheffield United	11 January 2019	
26 July 2018	GK	(Denmark)	Daniel Iversen	Leicester City	31 May 2019	
30 July 2018	CF	(England)	Sam Surridge	Bournemouth	7 January 2019	
14 August 2018	CF	(England)	Callum Lang	Wigan Athletic	31 May 2019	
31 August 2018	DM	(Australia)	Jordan Lyden	Aston Villa	7 January 2019	
14 November 2018	GK	(England)	Alex Palmer	West Bromwich Albion	22 November 2018	
28 January 2019	CB	(Scotland)	Alex Iacovitti	Nottingham Forest	31 May 2019	
31 January 2019	CF	(England)	Oladapo Afolayan	West Ham United	31 May 2019	
31 January 2019	RW	(England)	Zak Dearnley	Man Utd	31 May 2019	

=== Loans out ===
Start date	Position	Nationality	Name	To	End date	Ref.
9 August 2018	CB	(Republic of Ireland)	Anthony Gerrard	Carlisle United	January 2019	
27 September 2018	CB	(England)	Jamie Stott	Stockport County	22 December 2018	
26 January 2019	CB	(France)	Sonhy Sefil	Ashton United	23 February 2019	
26 January 2019	DF	(England)	Javid Swaby-Neavin	Ashton United	23 February 2019	
28 February 2019	CB	(England)	Jamie Stott	Stockport County	30 April 2019	
1 March 2019	DF	(England)	Jack Grundy	Barnoldswick Town	April 2019	

== Competitions ==
=== Pre-season friendlies ===
The Latics confirmed pre-season friendlies with Ashton United, Curzon Ashton, FC United of Manchester, Nottingham Forest and Preston North End.

10 July 2018 Friendly	Ashton United	1–3	Oldham Athletic	Ashton-under-Lyne
19:45 BST	Trialist 89' (pen.)	Report	Clarke 6'; Trialist 55'; Baxter 76'	Stadium: Hurst Cross

14 July 2018 Friendly	Curzon Ashton	0–2	Oldham Athletic	Ashton-under-Lyne
15:00 BST		Report	Gardner 56'; Branger 85'	Stadium: Tameside Stadium; Attendance: 651

17 July 2018 Friendly	FC United of Manchester	0–2	Oldham Athletic	Moston
19:45 BST		Report	Trialist 27'; Branger 60'	Stadium: Broadhurst Park; Attendance: 1,093

21 July 2018 Friendly	Oldham Athletic	2–2	Nottingham Forest	Oldham
15:00 BST	Trialist 48'; Edmundson 58'	Report	Cash 2'; Grabban 87'	Stadium: Boundary Park

28 July 2018 Friendly	Oldham Athletic	0–3	Preston North End	Oldham
15:00 BST		Report	Moult 50'; Horgan 68'; Gallagher 89' (pen.)	Stadium: Boundary Park

=== League Two ===
==== League table ====
Pos	Team	Pld	W	D	L	GF	GA	GD	Pts
12	Crewe Alexandra	46	19	8	19	60	59	+1	65
13	Swindon Town	46	16	16	14	59	56	+3	64
14	Oldham Athletic	46	16	14	16	67	60	+7	62
15	Northampton Town	46	14	19	13	64	63	+1	61
16	Cheltenham Town	46	15	12	19	57	68	−11	57

Source: EFL Official Website
Rules for classification: 1) Points; 2) Goal difference; 3) Number of goals scored; 4) Head-to-head results

==== Results summary ====
Overall								Home						Away					
Pld	W	D	L	GF	GA	GD	Pts	W	D	L	GF	GA	GD	W	D	L	GF	GA	GD
46	16	14	16	67	60	+7	62	10	6	7	42	33	+9	6	8	9	25	27	−2

Last updated: 4 May 2019.
Source: BBC

==== Results by matchday ====
Matchday	1	2	3	4	5	6	7	8	9	10	11	12	13	14	15	16	17	18	19	20	21	22	23	24	25	26	27	28	29	30	31	32	33	34	35	36	37	38	39	40	41	42	43	44	45	46
Ground	H	A	H	A	A	H	H	A	H	A	A	H	H	H	A	A	A	H	A	H	A	H	H	A	A	H	H	A	A	A	H	H	H	A	H	A	A	H	H	A	H	A	H	A	A	H
Result	L	D	W	D	W	W	L	W	D	D	D	L	L	W	L	L	D	W	D	D	W	W	L	L	W	W	D	L	L	W	W	D	L	L	D	D	L	W	W	W	D	D	W	L	L	L
Position	16	19	12	13	8	6	10	6	6	6	8	12	15	12	15	17	15	12	13	13	12	10	11	12	11	10	11	12	14	14	11	12	11	13	13	13	14	15	12	11	13	13	12	13	13	14

Updated to match(es) played on 4 May 2019. Source: Statto.com
A = Away; H = Home; W = Win; D = Draw; L = Loss

==== Matches ====
4 August 2018 1	Oldham Athletic	1–2	Milton Keynes Dons	Oldham
15:00 BST	Gardner 41'; Missilou (yellow card) 71'	Report	Agard 9' (pen.); Harley 22'; Walsh (yellow card) 69'	Stadium: Boundary Park; Attendance: 4,764; Referee: Neil Hair

11 August 2018 2	Forest Green Rovers	1–1	Oldham Athletic	Nailsworth
15:00 BST	Reid 22' (yellow card) 48'; Williams (yellow card) 72'	Report	Missilou (yellow card) 54'; Hunt (yellow card) 59'; Gardner 78'; Iversen (yellow card) 89'; Nepomuceno (yellow card) 90+4'	Stadium: The New Lawn; Attendance: 2,759; Referee: Darren Drysdale

18 August 2018 3	Oldham Athletic	3–1	Macclesfield Town	Oldham
15:00 BST	Surridge 16'; Nepomuceno (yellow card) 40'; Branger 53'; Miller 90+3'	Report	Rose 60'	Stadium: Boundary Park; Attendance: 4,330; Referee: Andy Haines

21 August 2018 4	Yeovil Town	0-0	Oldham Athletic	Yeovil
19:45 BST		Report	Miller (yellow card) 11'	Stadium: Huish Park; Attendance: 2,904; Referee: John Busby

25 August 2018 5	Morecambe	0–2	Oldham Athletic	Morecambe
15:00 BST		Report	O'Grady 27'; Nepomuceno 29'	Stadium: Globe Arena; Attendance: 3,050; Referee: Martin Coy

1 September 2018 6	Oldham Athletic	2–1	Crawley Town	Oldham
15:00 BST	Nepomuceno 8'; Surridge 89'	Report	Bulman 22'	Stadium: Boundary Park; Attendance: 4,160; Referee: Michael Salisbury

8 September 2018 7	Oldham Athletic	0–1	Newport County	Oldham
15:00 BST		Report	Bakinson 69'	Stadium: Boundary Park; Attendance: 4,293; Referee: Mark Heywood

15 September 2018 8	Grimsby Town	0–3	Oldham Athletic	Cleethorpes
15:00 BST		Report	Surridge 63', 65'; Baxter 90+2'	Stadium: Blundell Park; Attendance: 4,746; Referee: Nick Kinseley

22 September 2018 9	Oldham Athletic	3–3	Colchester United	Oldham
15:00 BST	Surridge 59', 85'; Clarke 88'	Report	Norris 15', 68'; Pell 50'	Stadium: Boundary Park; Attendance: 4,017; Referee: Anthony Backhouse

29 September 2018 10	Swindon Town	0–0	Oldham Athletic	Swindon
15:00 BST	Taylor (red card) 90+5'	Report		Stadium: County Ground; Attendance: 6,181; Referee: Craig Hicks

2 October 2018 11	Mansfield Town	0–0	Oldham Athletic	Mansfield
19:45 BST		Report		Stadium: Field Mill; Attendance: 3,892; Referee: Thomas Bramall

6 October 2018 12	Oldham Athletic	1–3	Carlisle United	Oldham
15:00 BST	Graham (yellow card) 7'; Miller 69'	Report	Hope 21'; Jones (yellow card) 48'; Nadesan 56'; Sowerby 57'	Stadium: Boundary Park; Attendance: 4,730; Referee: Dean Whitestone

20 October 2018 13	Oldham Athletic	0–1	Port Vale	Oldham
15:00 BST		Report	Pope 37' (pen.)	Stadium: Boundary Park; Attendance: 4,323; Referee: Peter Wright

23 October 2018 14	Oldham Athletic	2–0	Cheltenham Town	Oldham
19:45 BST	Benteke 75'; Lang 90+3'	Report	Jones (red card) 45'	Stadium: Boundary Park; Attendance: 2,865; Referee: Ben Toner

27 October 2018 15	Northampton Town	2–1	Oldham Athletic	Northampton
15:00 BST	O'Toole 36', (yellow card) 81'; Foley (red card) 42'; Van Veen (yellow card) 34', (goal) 45' (pen.); Powell (yellow card) 90'	Report	Hunt (yellow card) 35', (goal) 72'; Edmundson (yellow card) 43'	Stadium: Sixfields Stadium; Attendance: 4,767; Referee: Charles Breakspear

3 November 2018 16	Stevenage	3–2	Oldham Athletic	Stevenage
15:00 GMT	Byrom 22'; Timlin (yellow card) 40'; Guthrie 68'; Kennedy (yellow card) 80'; Newton 81'	Report	Miller 11'; Lang 63'	Stadium: Broadhall Way; Attendance: 2,583; Referee: Graham Scott

6 November 2018 17	Notts County	0–0	Oldham Athletic	Nottingham
19:45 GMT		Report		Stadium: Meadow Lane; Attendance: 4,478; Referee: Ollie Yates

17 November 2018 18	Oldham Athletic	3–1	Cambridge United	Oldham
15:00 GMT	Edmundson 61'; Lyden 76'; Lang 80'	Report	Maris 7'	Stadium: Boundary Park; Attendance: 3,818; Referee: Anthony Backhouse

24 November 2018 19	Tranmere Rovers	1–1	Oldham Athletic	Birkenhead
15:00 GMT	Jennings 72'	Report	Branger 40'	Stadium: Prenton Park; Attendance: 7,150; Referee: Sebastian Stockbridge

27 November 2018 20	Oldham Athletic	1–1	Lincoln City	Oldham
19:45 GMT	Miller (red card) 45+3'; Maouche 49'	Report	O'Connor 54'	Stadium: Boundary Park; Attendance: 3,597; Referee: Ben Toner

8 December 2018 21	Crewe Alexandra	0–2	Oldham Athletic	Crewe
15:00 GMT		Report	Clarke 17'; O'Grady 40'	Stadium: Gresty Road; Attendance: 4,168; Referee: Brett Huxtable

15 December 2018 22	Oldham Athletic	4–2	Bury	Oldham
15:00 GMT	O'Grady 8', 31', 62' (yellow card) 64'; Surridge 10'; Iversen (yellow card) 57'; Clarke (yellow card) 19'; Hunt (yellow card) 69'	Report	Maynard (yellow card) 40'; Lavery 46', 56'; McFadzean (yellow card) 80'	Stadium: Boundary Park; Attendance: 5,018; Referee: Darren England

22 December 2018 23	Oldham Athletic	2–3	Exeter City	Oldham
15:00 GMT	Surridge 12'; Lang 47'; Hunt (yellow card) 90+2'	Report	Taylor (yellow card) 11'; Stockley 38', 64', 70'	Stadium: Boundary Park; Attendance: 4,079; Referee: Martin Coy

26 December 2018 24	Carlisle United	6–0	Oldham Athletic	Carlisle
15:00 GMT	Hope 18'; Yates 30', 71'; Nadesan 60'; Grainger 64'; Etuhu (yellow card) 67'; Liddle 90+3'	Report	Edmundson (yellow card) 63'	Stadium: Brunton Park; Attendance: 5,465; Referee: Andy Haines

29 December 2018 25	Port Vale	1–4	Oldham Athletic	Stoke-on-Trent
15:00 GMT	Whitfield 39'; Oyeleke (yellow card) 50'; Hannant (yellow card) 61'	Report	Clarke (yellow card) 15'; Hamer (yellow card) 28'; Lang 32'; Maouche 53'; O'Grady (yellow card) 80' (goal) 90+3'; Nepomuceno 86'	Stadium: Vale Park; Attendance: 4,435; Referee: Paul Marsden

1 January 2019 26	Oldham Athletic	2–0	Notts County	Oldham
15:00 GMT	Missilou (yellow card) 33'; Hamer 40'; Clarke 47'	Report	Oxlade-Chamberlain (yellow card) 78' (yellow-red card) 83'	Stadium: Boundary Park; Attendance: 4,336; Referee: Anthony Backhouse

12 January 2019 27	Oldham Athletic	0–0	Forest Green Rovers	Oldham
15:00 GMT	Edmundson (yellow card) 32'; Lang (yellow card) 34'; Branger (yellow card) 65'	Report	Mills (yellow card) 73'	Stadium: Boundary Park; Attendance: 4,194; Referee: Dean Whitestone

19 January 2019 28	Macclesfield Town	2–1	Oldham Athletic	Macclesfield
15:00 GMT	Smith 45+3'; Wilson 54'	Report	Vera 1' (pen.); Clarke (yellow card) 19'; Sylla (yellow card) 21'; Edmundson (yellow card) 45+1'; Maouche (red card) 90+2'	Stadium: Moss Rose; Attendance: 3,697; Referee: Ollie Yates

29 January 2019 29	Milton Keynes Dons	2–1	Oldham Athletic	Milton Keynes
19:45 GMT	Aneke 14' (pen.); Agard 65' (pen.)	Report	Nepomuceno (yellow card) 41'; Hamer 67'	Stadium: Stadium mk Attendance: 5,950; Referee: Antony Coggins

2 February 2019 P	Oldham Athletic	P–P	Morecambe	Oldham
15:00 GMT		Report		Stadium: Boundary Park
Note: Fixture postponed due to pitch unplayable.

9 February 2019 30	Crawley Town	0–3	Oldham Athletic	Crawley
15:00 GMT	Young (yellow card) 35'; Francomb (yellow card) 73'	Report	Missilou (yellow card) 64'; Maouche (yellow card) 71'; Branger 74'; Dearnley 86'; Nepomuceno 90+4'	Stadium: Broadfield Stadium; Attendance: 2,058; Referee: John Busby

12 February 2019 31	Oldham Athletic	4–1	Yeovil Town	Oldham
19:45 GMT	Baxter 45+5'; Lang 51'; Maouche 88'; Missilou 89'	Report	Gray (yellow card) 15'; Pattison (yellow card) 32'; Mugabi 54'; Dobre (yellow card) 60'; Worthington (yellow card) 87'	Stadium: Boundary Park; Attendance: 3,868; Referee: Thomas Bramall

16 February 2019 32	Oldham Athletic	1–1	Crewe Alexandra	Oldham
15:00 GMT	Lang 23'; Branger (yellow card) 72'	Report	Ray (yellow card) 22' (goal) 90+3'; Pickering (yellow card) 43'; Kirk (yellow card) 73'	Stadium: Boundary Park; Attendance: 5,288; Referee: Graham Salisbury

19 February 2019 33	Oldham Athletic	1–2	Morecambe	Oldham
19:45 GMT	Clarke (yellow card) 68'; Baxter 76'	Report	Cranston 4' (yellow card) 74'; Collins 90' (yellow card) 90+1'	Stadium: Boundary Park; Attendance: 4,218; Referee: Andy Haines

23 February 2019 34	Bury	3–1	Oldham Athletic	Bury
15:00 GMT	Maynard 72', 90'; O'Shea 76'	Report	Lang 8'; Hunt (yellow card) 26'; Baxter (yellow card) 67'; Clarke (yellow card) 73'; Edmundson (yellow card) 85'	Stadium: Gigg Lane; Attendance: 7,784; Referee: Darren Drysdale

2 March 2019 35	Oldham Athletic	1–1	Stevenage	Oldham
15:00 GMT	Baxter 47'	Report	Wilkinson (yellow card) 42'; Guthrie 90+1'	Stadium: Boundary Park; Attendance: 3,807; Referee: Christopher Sarginson

9 March 2019 36	Cambridge United	1–1	Oldham Athletic	Cambridge
15:00 GMT	Lambe (yellow card) 27'; Brown 46'; Dunk (yellow card) 50'	Report	Dunk 12' (o.g.); Maouche (yellow card) 72'; Clarke (yellow card) 89'	Stadium: Abbey Stadium; Attendance: 4,758; Referee: Kevin Johnson

12 March 2019 37	Lincoln City	2–0	Oldham Athletic	Lincoln
19:45 GMT	Toffolo 30'; Rowe 58'	Report	Baxter (red card) 43'; Lang (yellow card) 66'; Hamer (yellow card) 71'	Stadium: Sincil Bank; Attendance: 8,454; Referee: Paul Marsden

16 March 2019 P	Oldham Athletic	P–P	Tranmere Rovers	Oldham
15:00 GMT		Report		Stadium: Boundary Park
Note: Fixture was postponed due to heavy rainfall overnight.

30 March 2019 38	Oldham Athletic	2–0	Grimsby Town	Oldham
15:00 GMT	O'Grady 42'; Lang 77' (yellow card) 90+1'	Report	Hessenthaler (yellow card) 63'; Davis (yellow card) 83'	Stadium: Boundary Park; Attendance: 3,998; Referee: James Adcock

2 April 2019 39	Oldham Athletic	2–0	Tranmere Rovers	Oldham
19:45 BST	Lang 7', 61'; Edmundson (yellow card) 90+1'	Report	Ridehalgh (yellow card) 42'; Perkins (yellow card) 90+2'	Stadium: Boundary Park; Attendance: 5,143; Referee: Matt Donohue

6 April 2019 40	Colchester United	0–2	Oldham Athletic	Colchester
15:00 BST	Senior (yellow card) 51'; Dickenson (yellow card) 78'; Stevenson (yellow card) 90'	Report	Iacovitti 6'; Lang 12' (yellow card) 80'; Hamer (yellow card) 30'	Stadium: Colchester Community Stadium; Attendance: 3,975; Referee: Lee Swabey

13 April 2019 41	Oldham Athletic	2–2	Swindon Town	Oldham
15:00 BST	Edmundson 7' (yellow card) 45+2'; Branger 70'	Report	Doughty (yellow card) 32' (goal) 45+2'; Bennett 60'	Stadium: Boundary Park; Attendance: 4,064; Referee: Martin Coy

19 April 2019 42	Cheltenham Town	0–0	Oldham Athletic	Cheltenham
15:00 BST	Maddox (yellow card) 79'	Report	Edmundson (yellow card) 78'	Stadium: Whaddon Road; Attendance: 4,022; Referee: Ben Toner

22 April 2019 43	Oldham Athletic	3–2	Mansfield Town	Oldham
15:00 BST	Nepomuceno 29', 67'; Missilou (yellow card) 45'; Maouche 56'	Report	Grant (yellow card) 38'; Walker 60'; Bishop 76'	Stadium: Boundary Park; Attendance: 6,179; Referee: John Busby

27 April 2019 44	Exeter City	1–0	Oldham Athletic	Exeter
15:00 BST	Williams (yellow card) 13'; Taylor (yellow card) 61'; Bowman 79'; Sweeney (yellow card) 89'	Report	Iacovitti (yellow card) 45+1'; Edmundson (yellow card) 85'	Stadium: St James Park; Attendance: 5,040; Referee: Christopher Sarginson

30 April 2019 45	Newport County	2–0	Oldham Athletic	Newport
19:45 BST	O'Brien 48'; Willmott 79'; Azeez (yellow card) 90+1'	Report	Afolayan (yellow card) 72'	Stadium: Rodney Parade; Attendance: 4,642; Referee: Craig Hicks

4 May 2019 46	Oldham Athletic	2–5	Northampton Town	Oldham
15:00 BST	Branger 11'; Lang 64' (yellow card) 88'	Report	Hoskins 22'; Pierre 29' (yellow card) 40'; Williams 44', 49'; Foley (yellow card) 58'; Morias 80'	Stadium: Boundary Park; Attendance: 5,291; Referee: Thomas Bramall

=== FA Cup ===
The first round draw was made live on BBC by Dennis Wise and Dion Dublin on 22 October. The draw for the second round was made live on BBC and BT by Mark Schwarzer and Glenn Murray on 12 November. The third round draw was made live on BBC by Ruud Gullit and Paul Ince from Stamford Bridge on 3 December 2018. The fourth round draw was made live on BBC by Robbie Keane and Carl Ikeme from Wolverhampton on 7 January 2019.

12 November 2018 First round	Hampton & Richmond Borough	1–2	Oldham Athletic	Hampton
19:45 GMT	Dickson 15' (pen.)	Report	Hunt 88'; Lang 90+5'	Stadium: Beveree Stadium; Attendance: 2,720; Referee: Tom Nield

1 December 2018 Second round	Maidstone United	0–2	Oldham Athletic	Maidstone
15:00 GMT		Report	Clarke 17'; O'Grady 84'	Stadium: Gallagher Stadium; Attendance: 3,560; Referee: Alan Young

6 January 2019 Third round	Fulham	1–2	Oldham Athletic	Fulham
14:00 GMT	Kebano (yellow card) 38'; Odoi 52' (yellow card) 62'; Sessegnon (yellow card) 76'; Mitrović (penalty missed) 84'	Report	Surridge 76' (pen.); Lyden (yellow card) 83'; Lang 88'	Stadium: Craven Cottage; Referee: Anthony Taylor

26 January 2019 Fourth round	Doncaster Rovers	2–1	Oldham Athletic	Doncaster
15:00 GMT	Mason (yellow card) 66'; Whiteman 68', 90' (pen.); Wilks (yellow card) 73'	Report	Baxter (yellow card) 73'; Clarke 84' (red card) 90+6'; Edmundson (yellow card) 86'; Branger (yellow card) 89'	Stadium: Keepmoat Stadium; Attendance: 11,260; Referee: Peter Bankes

=== EFL Cup ===
On 15 June 2018, the draw for the first round was made in Vietnam.

14 August 2018 First round	Oldham Athletic	0–2	Derby County	Oldham
19:45 BST		Report	Tomori 36'; Mount 70'	Stadium: Boundary Park; Attendance: 3,376; Referee: Darren Bond

=== EFL Trophy ===
On 13 July 2018, the initial group stage draw bar the U21 invited clubs was announced. The draw for the second round was made live on Talksport by Leon Britton and Steve Claridge on 16 November.

Pos	Lge	Team	Pld	W	PW	PL	L	GF	GA	GD	Pts	Qualification
1	L1	Barnsley	3	2	1	0	0	5	3	+2	8	Round 2
2	L2	Oldham Athletic	3	2	0	0	1	8	5	+3	6	Round 2
3	ACA	Everton U21	3	0	0	2	1	4	5	−1	2	
4	L1	Bradford City	3	0	1	0	2	3	7	−4	2	

Source: EFL.com

4 September 2018 Group stages	Oldham Athletic	1–2	Barnsley	Oldham
19:30 BST	Surridge 31'	Report	Adeboyejo 44'; Moncur 82'	Stadium: Boundary Park; Attendance: 1,786; Referee: Sebastian Stockbridge

9 October 2018 Group stages	Bradford City	1–4	Oldham Athletic	Bradford
19:30 BST	Brünker 49'	Report	Lang 10'; Maouche 26'; Surridge 57', 77'	Stadium: Valley Parade; Attendance: 1,105

30 October 2018 Group stages	Oldham Athletic	3–2	Everton U21	Oldham
19:30 BST	Clarke 53'; Miller 57'; Benteke 80'	Report	Markelo 6'; Lavery 24'	Stadium: Boundary Park; Attendance: 1,004

5 December 2018 Second round	Rochdale	P–P	Oldham Athletic	Rochdale
19:00 GMT		Report		Stadium: Spotland Stadium
Note: Fixture was postponed due to waterlogged pitch.

11 December 2018 Second round	Rochdale	2–0	Oldham Athletic	Rochdale
19:00 GMT	Rafferty 90+2' (pen.); Adshead 90+4'	Report	Maouche (red card) 51'	Stadium: Spotland Stadium; Attendance: 1,854
