= George Edmundson (footballer) =

English footballer (born 1997)

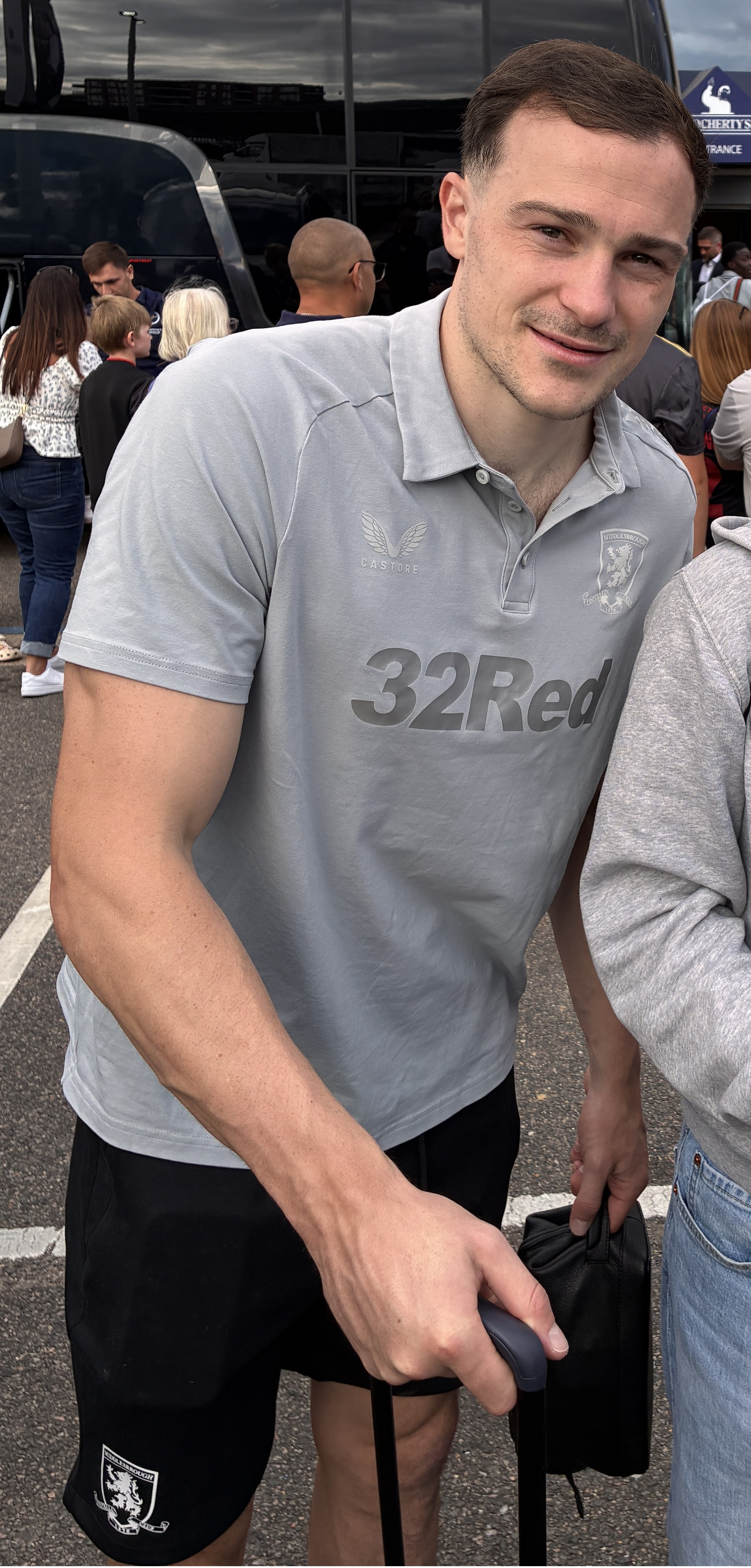
- George Edmundson in July 2025.

Personal information
- Full name: Samuel George Alan Edmundson
- Date of birth: 15 August 1997 (age 29)
- Place of birth: Manchester, England
- Height: 1.90 m (6 ft 3 in)
- Position: Centre-back

Team information
- Current team: Middlesbrough
- Number: 25

Youth career
- 2013–2015: Oldham Athletic

Senior career*
Years	Team	Apps	(Gls)
2015–2019	Oldham Athletic	65	(3)
2015	→ Ramsbottom United (loan)	2	(0)
2016	→ Alfreton Town (loan)	8	(2)
2017–2018	→ AFC Fylde (loan)	10	(0)
2019–2021	Rangers	8	(1)
2021	→ Derby County (loan)	10	(1)
2021–2025	Ipswich Town	61	(4)
2024–2025	→ Middlesbrough (loan)	20	(1)
2025–	Middlesbrough	11	(0)
- * Club domestic league appearances and goals as of 01:12, 8 August 2026 (UTC)

Samuel George Alan Edmundson (born 15 August 1997) is an English professional footballer who plays as a centre-back for EFL Championship club Middlesbrough.

Born in Manchester, Edmundson began his career at Oldham Athletic, joining the club's academy in 2013 and going on to make his senior debut in 2015. He spent six years at Oldham, spending time out on loan at Ramsbottom United, Alfreton Town and AFC Fylde during his time at the club. In June 2019, He joined Scottish club Rangers from Oldham. He spent two seasons at Rangers, including spending time out on loan at Derby County in 2021. He signed for Ipswich Town in July 2021 and is spending time out on loan to Middlesbrough.

== Career ==
=== Oldham Athletic ===
Edmundson signed for Oldham Athletic on a two-year scholarship on 14 July 2013 at the age of 15. He signed a one-year professional contract on 13 May 2015. He was first included in a senior matchday squad on 22 August 2015, remaining an unused substitute in a 1–1 League One draw against Shrewsbury Town at Boundary Park. Nine days later, away to the same opposition, he made his senior debut in the first round of the Football League Trophy, playing the full 90 minutes of a 0–2 defeat at the New Meadow. He made 3 appearances for Oldham during his first season in senior football, whilst also spending time on loan at Northern Premier League side Ramsbottom United.

He made his first appearance of the 2016–17 season on 30 August, starting in a 4–5 home defeat against Carlisle United in an EFL Trophy group stage match. Edmundson made 5 appearances for Oldham during the season, while also spending time out on loan at Alfreton Town.

On 13 October 2017, Edmundson joined National League side AFC Fylde on a one-month loan deal along with teammate Jamie Stott. After impressing in his loan spell at AFC Fylde, Edmundson returned to Oldham Athletic in January 2018, working his way into the first-team upon his return. He scored his first goal for Oldham on the final day of the 2017–18 season, netting in a 2–2 draw with Northampton Town. He made 17 appearances for Oldham during the season, scoring once.

He started the opening match of the 2018–19 season against Milton Keynes Dons. On 16 August 2018, Edmundson signed a two-year contract extension with Oldham until the summer of 2020. He scored his first goal of the season in a 3–1 away win against Cambridge United on 17 November. During the 2018–19 season, Edmundson formed an impressive partnership with veteran defender Peter Clarke, being named in the EFL League Two Team of the Season, while also winning Oldham's Players' Player of the Season award. In total, he made 54 appearances in all competitions over the course of the season, scoring twice.

=== Rangers ===
Edmundson signed for Scottish club Rangers on 21 June 2019, for an undisclosed transfer fee, where he claimed the number 4 shirt he wore at Oldham. He made his Rangers and European competition debut on 18 July, starting against St. Joseph's of Gibraltar, in a 6–0 Rangers victory in the second leg of the Europa League first qualifying round. He scored his first goal for the club in a 2–1 home win against Hibernian at Ibrox on 5 February 2020. During his first season at Ibrox, Edmundson earned the nickname 'The Fridge' from his team-mates and the Rangers supporters. On 12 March 2020, he scored in a Europa League round of 16 first leg tie against Bayer Leverkusen, a match in which Rangers eventually lost 1–3. Edmundson made 16 appearances in all competitions during his first season at Rangers, scoring twice.

He made his first appearance of the 2020–21 season on 17 September in a UEFA Europa League second qualifying round tie against Lincoln Red Imps in which Rangers won 5–0. His first league appearance of the season came on 27 September, coming on as a second-half substitute in a 5–1 away win against Motherwell. On 2 November 2020 it was announced that Edmundson and Jordan Jones had been suspended by Rangers, pending an internal investigation, for attending a party and breaking coronavirus regulations. He did not feature for Rangers for the remainder of the season, making only two appearances for the club as Rangers won the Scottish Premiership title.

==== Derby County (loan) ====
On 1 February 2021, Edmundson joined Derby County on loan until the end of the 2020–21 season. He made his debut for Derby on 16 February in a 2–1 away win against Wycombe Wanderers. He scored his first goal for Derby in a 2–0 win against Huddersfield Town on 23 February 2021. Edmundson made 10 appearances for Derby during his loan spell, helping the club to stay in the Championship on the final day of the season, following a 3–3 draw against Sheffield Wednesday.

=== Ipswich Town ===
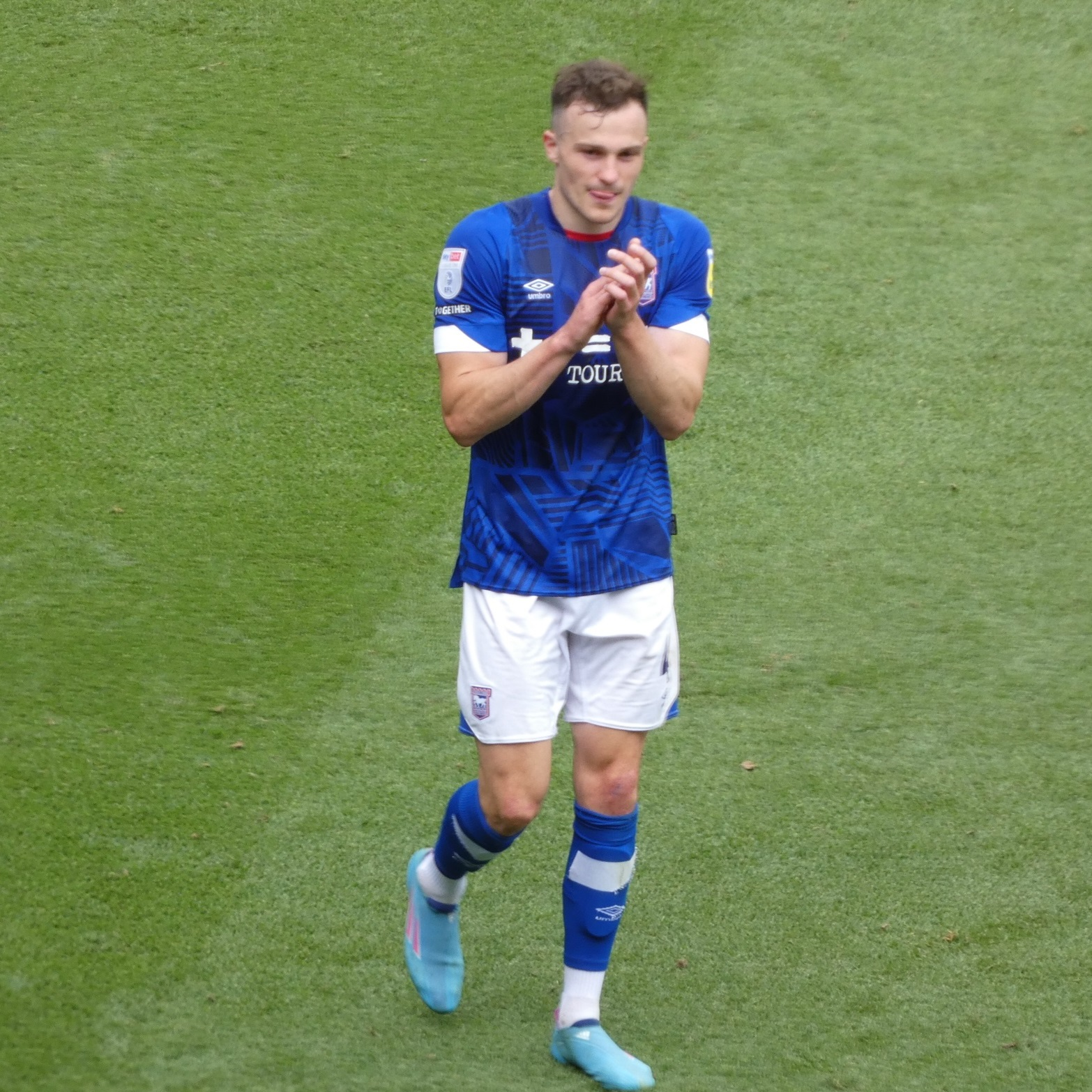
George Edmundson playing for Ipswich Town in July 2022.

Edmundson signed for Ipswich Town on 27 July 2021, on a four-year deal, for an undisclosed fee. He made his debut for Ipswich on 11 September in a 2–5 home defeat against Bolton Wanderers at Portman Road. He scored his first goal for the club two games later, netting the final goal in a 6–0 home win against Doncaster Rovers at Portman Road. Edmundson quickly established himself as a key player in the Ipswich defence. On 25 January, he captained Ipswich for the first time in a 2–0 away win against AFC Wimbledon, as club captain Sam Morsy was suspended. He continued to captain the team for the following three matches before handing the armband back over to Morsy following his return from suspension. Edmundson suffered an ankle injury in a 2–0 win against Lincoln City on 8 March, ruling him out of action for the "foreseeable" future.

=== Middlesbrough ===
On 30 August 2024, Edmundson signed for Championship club Middlesbrough for the season. Ipswich recalled Edmundson from the loan on 21 January 2025 after Middlesbrough had two bids rejected to sign him permanently, but did, in fact, join the club on a permanent transfer four days later for an undisclosed fee.

== Career statistics ==
As of match played 5 October 2024

Appearances and goals by club, season and competition
Club	Season	League			National Cup (Note: Includes FA Cup and Scottish Cup)		League Cup (Note: Includes EFL Cup and Scottish League Cup)		Other		Total	
Club	Season	Division	Apps	Goals	Apps	Goals	Apps	Goals	Apps	Goals	Apps	Goals
Oldham Athletic	2015–16	League One	2	0	0	0	0	0	1 (Note: Appearance in Football League Trophy)	0	3	0
Oldham Athletic	2016–17	League One	3	0	0	0	0	0	2 (Note: Appearances in EFL Trophy)	0	5	0
Oldham Athletic	2017–18	League One	15	1	0	0	0	0	2	0	17	1
Oldham Athletic	2018–19	League Two	45	2	4	0	1	0	4	0	54	2
Oldham Athletic	Total		65	3	4	0	1	0	9	0	79	3
Ramsbottom United (loan)	2015–16	Northern Premier League	2	0	0	0	—		0	0	2	0
Alfreton Town (loan)	2016–17	National League North	8	2	0	0	—		0	0	8	2
AFC Fylde (loan)	2017–18	National League	10	0	3	0	—		1 (Note: Appearance in FA Trophy)	0	14	0
Rangers	2019–20	Scottish Premiership	7	1	3	0	1	0	4 (Note: Appearance(s) in UEFA Europa League)	1	15	2
Rangers	2020–21	Scottish Premiership	1	0	0	0	0	0	1	0	2	0
Rangers	Total		8	1	3	0	1	0	5	1	17	2
Derby County (loan)	2020–21	Championship	10	1	0	0	0	0	—		10	1
Ipswich Town	2021–22	League One	32	2	2	0	0	0	0	0	34	2
Ipswich Town	2022–23	League One	18	2	3	0	0	0	4	1	25	3
Ipswich Town	2023–24	Championship	10	0	2	0	3	0	—		15	0
Ipswich Town	2024–25	Premier League	1	0	0	0	0	0	—		1	0
Ipswich Town	Total		61	4	7	0	3	0	4	1	75	5
Middlesbrough (loan)	2024–25	Championship	20	1	1	0	0	0	—		21	1
Middlesbrough	2024–25	Championship	4	0	—		—		—		4	0
Middlesbrough	2025–26	Championship	7	0	0	0	0	0	0	0	7	0
Middlesbrough	2026–27	Championship	0	0	0	0	1	0	0	0	1	0
Middlesbrough	Total		11	0	0	0	1	0	0	0	12	0
Career total			195	12	18	0	6	0	19	2	238	14

== Honours ==
Ipswich Town

- EFL League One runner-up: 2022–23
- EFL Championship runner-up: 2023–24

Individual

- EFL League Two Team of the Season: 2018–19
- Oldham Athletic Players' Player of the Season: 2018–19
