= Jordan Lyden =

Australian soccer player (born 1996)

Personal information
- Full name: Jordan David Lyden
- Date of birth: 30 January 1996 (age 30)
- Place of birth: Perth, Australia
- Height: 1.83 m (6 ft 0 in)
- Position: Defensive midfielder

Team information
- Current team: Bromsgrove Sporting

Youth career
- ECU Joondalup
- 2012–15: Aston Villa

Senior career*
Years	Team	Apps	(Gls)
2015–2019	Aston Villa	4	(0)
2018–2019	→ Oldham Athletic (loan)	10	(1)
2019–2022	Swindon Town	45	(1)
2023	Leyton Orient	5	(0)
2023–2024	Hereford	13	(0)
2024–	Bromsgrove Sporting	17	(0)

International career^{‡}
2014	Australia U20	2	(0)
- * Club domestic league appearances and goals as of 20:27, 7 May 2025 (UTC) ‡ National team caps and goals as of 26 July 2019

Jordan David Lyden (born 30 January 1996) is an Australian soccer player who plays as a defensive midfielder for Southern League Premier Division Central club Bromsgrove Sporting.

Born in Perth, Lyden played youth soccer for ECU Joondalup before moving to England to play for Aston Villa in 2012, making his professional debut for the side in 2016.

He has represented Australia at under-20 level.

== Club career ==
=== Aston Villa ===
Born in Perth, Australia, Lyden moved to England at the age of 16 and joined the academy of Aston Villa. In December 2015, Lyden got called up to the senior side, who were struggling in the Premier League at the bottom of the table. He made his professional senior debut for the side on 9 January 2016 in the FA Cup against Wycombe Wanderers. He came on as an 83rd-minute substitute in a 1–1 draw. He was handed his first start, playing at right-back, in the replay ten days later which resulted in a 2–0 win for Villa. Lyden made his Premier League debut for the side on 14 February 2016 against Liverpool, coming on as a substitute for Leandro Bacuna after 66 minutes with the team five goals down, with the game finishing 6–0. Lyden made his league starting debut for Aston Villa in his third Premier League appearance on 10 April against Bournemouth.

Lyden's Aston Villa career was beset by a number of injuries, and found it difficult to stake a claim to a first team space. On 31 August 2018, after making only four first team appearances in his six years at the club, Lyden went on loan to Oldham Athletic. On 17 November 2018, Lyden scored his first goal in league football in a 3–1 victory for Oldham over Cambridge United. The long range effort earned plaudits from fans across the Football League. He returned to Aston Villa on 1 January 2019, after playing 14 times for Oldham, and scoring 1 goal. He hoped that his performances on loan would be enough to secure him a new contract.

However, Lyden's poor luck with injuries continued; and on 11 January 2019, just 10 days after returning to Aston Villa from his loan spell, Lyden suffered a muscle injury in training – which would take three months to recover from.

On 17 March 2019, Lyden made a post on his personal Instagram announcing that he had left Aston Villa. After leaving Villa, Lyden trained with EFL League One club Southend United.

=== Swindon Town ===
On 26 July 2019, Lyden joined EFL League Two club Swindon Town on a one-year deal following a successful trial. In his first season he helped Swindon win the league title and promotion to League One. Later that summer he signed a new two-year contract with the club. He suffered a season-ending achilles injury in February 2022, and was released by Swindon in the summer.

=== Leyton Orient ===
On 20 January 2023, Lyden signed for then-League Two leaders Leyton Orient on a short-term deal until the end of the season. He featured in five league matches for the O's as they went on to win the league title and promotion to League One. He was released by the club at the end of the season.

=== Hereford ===
On 15 September 2023, Lyden signed for National League North club Hereford, reuniting with former Swindon team mate Paul Caddis. He made his debut for the club the following day, starting and playing 63 minutes before being substituted, in a 2–0 FA Cup second qualifying round win over Anstey Nomads. He signed a contract at Hereford until the end of the season a month later, along with Paul Downing. At the end of the 2023–24 season, he was invited back to pre-season training with the club, but suffered a long-term injury during a pre-season friendly.

=== Bromsgrove Sporting ===
On 15 December 2024, Lyden signed for Southern League Premier Division Central club Bromsgrove Sporting.

== International career ==
In late 2013, Lyden was called up to the Australia under-20 side to travel to Malaysia for 2014 AFC U-19 Championship qualification. He made his debut for the Young Socceroos in a win over Hong Kong, coming on for Stefan Mauk in the second half.

== Career statistics ==
As of end of 2024–25 season

Appearances and goals by club, season and competition
Club	Season	League			FA Cup		League Cup		Other		Total	
Club	Season	Division	Apps	Goals	Apps	Goals	Apps	Goals	Apps	Goals	Apps	Goals
Aston Villa	2015–16	Premier League	4	0	2	0	0	0	—		6	0
Aston Villa	2016–17	Championship	0	0	0	0	0	0	—		0	0
Aston Villa	2017–18	Championship	0	0	0	0	2	0	0	0	2	0
Aston Villa	2018–19	Championship	0	0	0	0	0	0	0	0	0	0
Aston Villa	Total		4	0	2	0	2	0	0	0	8	0
Oldham Athletic (loan)	2018–19	League Two	10	1	2	0	—		2 (Note: Appearance(s) in EFL Trophy)	0	14	1
Swindon Town	2019–20	League Two	21	1	2	0	1	0	0	0	24	1
Swindon Town	2020–21	League One	14	0	0	0	1	0	0	0	15	0
Swindon Town	2021–22	League Two	10	0	1	0	0	0	3	1	14	1
Swindon Town	Total		45	1	3	0	2	0	3	1	53	2
Leyton Orient	2022–23	League Two	5	0	—		—		—		5	0
Hereford	2023–24	National League North	13	0	2	0	—		1 (Note: Appearance in FA Trophy)	0	16	0
Bromsgrove Sporting	2024–25	SFL Premier Division Central	17	0	—		—		1 (Note: Appearance in Worcestershire Senior Cup)	0	18	0
Career total			94	2	9	0	4	0	7	1	114	3

== Honours ==
Aston Villa U23s

- Premier League Cup: 2017–18

Swindon Town

- EFL League Two: 2019–20
