= Christopher Missilou =

Congolese footballer (born 1992)

Personal information
- Full name: Christopher Gaël Missilou
- Date of birth: 18 July 1992 (age 34)
- Place of birth: Auxerre, France
- Height: 1.80 m (5 ft 11 in)
- Position: Midfielder

Youth career
- 2000–2002: Bièvres AC
- 2002–2005: Ville d'Evry SPC
- 2005–2011: Auxerre

Senior career*
Years	Team	Apps	(Gls)
2010–2013	Auxerre B	80	(6)
2011–2013	Auxerre	1	(0)
2014	Évry	11	(1)
2014–2015	Stade Brest	1	(0)
2014–2015	Brest B	24	(1)
2016–2017	Montceau Bourgogne	36	(7)
2017–2018	L'Entente SSG	6	(0)
2018	Le Puy Foot	15	(3)
2018–2020	Oldham Athletic	72	(4)
2020–2021	Northampton Town	15	(1)
2021	Swindon Town	11	(0)
2021	Newport County	4	(0)
2022	Oldham Athletic	20	(2)
2022–2023	Hartlepool United	4	(1)

International career
2010	France U18	3	(1)
2012–	Congo	3	(1)
- * Club domestic league appearances and goals as of 18:05, 1 January 2023 (UTC)

Christopher Gaël Missilou (born 18 July 1992) is a professional footballer who plays as a midfielder.

He is a former France youth international and full Congo international. Missilou came through the youth ranks at Auxerre, before playing a single game in Ligue 1. He has had spells at Stade Brestois, Montceau Bourgogne, L'Etente SSG, Le Puy Foot, Oldham Athletic, Northampton Town, Swindon Town and Newport County. He most recently played for Hartlepool United.

== Career ==
=== Oldham Athletic ===
On 13 July 2018, following a successful trial, Missilou signed a one-year contract with League Two side Oldham Athletic. In his first season he was a first team regular and was impressive in the team's standout 2–1 win at Premier league Fulham, in the FA Cup. Missilou scored a single league goal, in Paul Scholes' first match in charge of Oldham, a 4–1 victory against Yeovil Town

At the end of the 2018–19 season, a contract extension option was exercised.

=== Northampton Town ===
On 27 July 2020, Missilou joined League One club Northampton Town on a one-year deal.

=== Swindon Town ===
On 1 February 2021, Missilou joined League One side Swindon Town on a permanent basis. On 14 May 2021, it was announced that he would leave Swindon at the end of the season, following the expiry of his contract.

=== Newport County ===
On 2 July 2021, Missilou joined League Two club Newport County on a one-year deal. He made his debut for Newport on 10 August 2021 in the starting line-up for the 1–0 EFL Cup first round win against Ipswich Town. On 13 December 2021, his Newport contract was cancelled by mutual consent.

=== Return to Oldham Athletic ===
Missilou rejoined Oldham on 15 January 2022 for the remainder of the 2021–22 season. Missilou was released following relegation at the end of the season.

=== Hartlepool United ===
On 18 November 2022, Missilou joined League Two side Hartlepool United on a short-term deal, re-joining former boss Keith Curle. Missilou scored on his Hartlepool debut, a late consolation in a defeat to Barrow. On 20 January 2023, manager Keith Curle confirmed that Missilou's short-term deal had ended.

== Career statistics ==
As of matches played 1 January 2023

Appearances and goals by club, season and competition
Club	Season	League			FA Cup		League Cup		Other		Total	
Club	Season	Division	Apps	Goals	Apps	Goals	Apps	Goals	Apps	Goals	Apps	Goals
Oldham Athletic	2018–19	League Two	42	1	3	0	1	0	4	0	50	1
Oldham Athletic	2019–20	League Two	30	3	2	0	1	0	1	0	34	3
Total			72	4	5	0	2	0	5	0	84	4
Northampton Town	2020–21	League One	15	1	1	0	2	0	2	0	20	1
Swindon Town	2020–21	League One	11	0	0	0	0	0	0	0	11	0
Newport County	2021–22	League Two	4	0	0	0	2	0	2	0	8	0
Oldham Athletic	2021–22	League Two	20	2	0	0	0	0	0	0	20	2
Hartlepool United	2022–23	League Two	4	1	1	0	0	0	0	0	5	1
Total			126	8	7	0	6	0	9	0	148	8
