= Javid Swaby-Neavin =

English footballer

Personal information
- Full name: Javid Reece Swaby-Neavin
- Date of birth: 11 June 2001 (age 25)
- Place of birth: Stevenage, England
- Height: 5 ft 9 in (1.76 m)
- Position: Defender

Team information
- Current team: Atherton Collieries

Youth career
- –2018: Oldham Athletic

Senior career*
Years	Team	Apps	(Gls)
2018–2020	Oldham Athletic	1	(0)
2019	→ Ashton United (loan)	10	(0)
2019–2020	→ Radcliffe (loan)	23	(0)
2020–2021	Radcliffe	7	(0)
2021–2022	FC Halifax Town	4	(0)
2022	→ Hyde United (loan)	6	(0)
2022–2023	Hyde United	33	(1)
2023–2024	Warrington Rylands 1906	33	(0)
2024–2025	Stalybridge Celtic	26	(0)
2025–	Atherton Collieries	0	(0)
- * Club domestic league appearances and goals as of 12:07, 2 July 2025 (UTC)

Javid Reece Swaby-Neavin (born 11 June 2001) is an English professional footballer who plays as a defender for Northern Premier League Division One West club Atherton Collieries.

== Career ==
Born in Stevenage, Swaby-Neavin has played for Oldham Athletic, Ashton United and Radcliffe.

He turned professional with Oldham in May 2019, having spent time on loan at Ashton United in January and February 2019. He moved on loan to Radcliffe in August 2019.

He was released by Oldham at the end of the 2019–20 season.

After spending the 2020–21 season with Radcliffe, on 19 August 2021, Swaby-Neavin joined National League side FC Halifax Town on a short-term deal. On 28 February 2022, he was sent out on loan to Northern Premier League Premier Division side Hyde United on a one-month loan deal, with the club hovering just above the relegation zone. In June 2022, Swaby-Neavin returned to Hyde United on a permanent basis.

He signed for Warrington Rylands 1906 for the 2023–24 season.

Following a season with Stalybridge Celtic, in June 2025 Swaby-Neavin joined Atherton Collieries.
