= Johan Branger =

Association football player (born 1993)

Personal information
- Full name: Johan Okeiths Branger Engone
- Date of birth: 5 July 1993 (age 33)
- Place of birth: Sens, France
- Height: 1.83 m (6 ft 0 in)
- Position: Midfielder

Team information
- Current team: Thonon Evian

Senior career*
Years	Team	Apps	(Gls)
2011–2013	Auxerre B	26	(2)
2014–2015	Raon-l'Étape	20	(8)
2015–2017	Sens	16	(4)
2017–2018	Dieppe	26	(11)
2018–2020	Oldham Athletic	51	(7)
2020–2021	Fréjus Saint-Raphaël	1	(0)
2021–	Thonon Evian	23	(6)

International career
2012–2017	Gabon	2	(0)
- * Club domestic league appearances and goals as of 04:47, 9 June 2022 (UTC)

Johan Okeiths Branger Engone (born 5 July 1993) is a professional footballer who plays as a midfielder for Championnat National 1 club Thonon Evian. Born in France, he is a former Gabon international.

== Club career ==
Born in Sens, Branger spent his early career in France with Auxerre II, Raon-l'Étape, Sens and Dieppe. In July 2018 he signed for English club Oldham Athletic. He made his debut on 4 August 2018, in a League match against MK Dons. After leaving Oldham, he signed for Fréjus Saint-Raphaël in October 2020.

== International career ==
Branger made one international appearance for Gabon national team in 2012.

== Honours ==
Thonon Evian

- Championnat National 3: 2021–22
